= National Historic Fleet =

List of historic UK ships and vessels

Registered vessel flag

Membership of the National Historic Fleet flag

Flags of the National Register of Historic Vessels

The National Historic Fleet is a list of historic ships and vessels located in the United Kingdom, under the National Historic Ships register. National Historic Ships UK is an advisory body which advises the Secretary of State for Culture, Media and Sport and other public bodies on ship preservation and funding priorities. As part of this remit, National Historic Ships maintains the National Register of Historic Vessels (NRHV), which as of September 2014 listed over 1,000 vessels. The National Historic Fleet is a sub-grouping of this register, the vessels included on this list are distinguished by:

- Being of pre-eminent national or regional significance
- Spanning the spectrum of UK maritime history
- Illustrating changes in construction and technology
- Meriting a higher priority for long term preservation

The National Historic Fleet may also include vessels from the National Small Boat Register which are a minimum of 50 years old and which fit the above criteria.

As of September 2014 there are 206 vessels on the register, including museum ships, those still in active or commercial service, and a number currently laid up. Some are being actively restored, others have an uncertain future.

Name	Image	Builder	Where built	Year	Class	Type	Location	Status	Remarks	Certificate No.	Link
ADC		Aldous & Sons	Brightlingsea	1895		Fishing smack	St Osyth	In private ownership		1451	
Advance		Richard Dunston	Thorne	1942		Victualling Inshore Craft	Plymouth	Undergoing restoration		79	
Alaska		J. S. & W. J. Horsham & Co.	Bourne End, Buckinghamshire	1883		River launch	Marlow, Buckinghamshire	Operational, available for hire		7	
Albion		William Brighton	Lake Lothing, Suffolk	1898		Trading wherry	Ludham	Preserved, operational	Used for sail training	99	
Alfred Corry		Beeching Brothers	Great Yarmouth	1893		Lifeboat	Southwold	Museum exhibit		101	
Amy Howson		Joseph Scarr & Sons	Beverley, East Riding of Yorkshire	1914		Humber sloop	South Ferriby	Operational, available for hire		103	
B.A.S.P		J. Samuel White, & Co Ltd	East Cowes, Isle of Wight	1924	Watson class	Lifeboat	Chatham Dockyard	Museum exhibit		1687	
Balmoral		John I. Thornycroft & Company	Woolston, Southampton	1949		Ferry	Bristol	Preserved, operational		128	
Barcadale		Herd & Mackenzie	Buckie	1938		Fishing drifter	River Clyde	Privately owned, undergoing restoration		1443	
Basuto		W. Jacks & Co	Port Dundas	1902		Clyde puffer	Ellesmere Port	Museum exhibit	Part of the National Waterways Museum, Ellesmere Port	11	
Bertha		G. Lunnel & Co	Bristol	1844		Dredger	Bristol	Not on public display	Designed by Isambard Kingdom Brunel. Worked in Bridgwater docks	17	
Branksome		George Brockbank	Windermere	1896		Steam Launch	Windermere Jetty: Museum of Boats, Steam and Stories	Museum Exhibit		2	
Britannia		John Brown & Company	Clydebank	1952		Royal Yacht/Hospital Ship	Leith, Edinburgh	Floating museum		1919	
Bruce's		James N Miller & Sons	St Monans	1926	Fifie	Fishing drifter	Queensferry	Operational, private		1378	
Cabby		London & Rochester Trading Company	Rochester, Kent	1928		Thames sailing barge	Maylandsea	Operational, Preserved	One of the "Little Ships of Dunkirk"	134	
Calshot	Calshot-B	John I. Thornycroft & Company	Woolston, Southampton	1936		Tugboat	Southampton	Scrapped	Tug, tender & excursion vessel- Scrapped in 2022 following growing costs to restore her	1	
Cambria		William Everard	Greenhithe	1906		Thames sailing barge	Faversham	Operational, private		245	
Carola		Scott & Co	Bowling, West Dunbartonshire	1898		Steam yacht	Irvine	Museum exhibit	Part of the Scottish Maritime Museum	9	
Centaur		John & Herbert Cann	Harwich	1895		Thames sailing barge	Maldon, Essex	Operational, private		193	
Cervia		Alexander Hall & Co	Aberdeen	1945		Tugboat	Ramsgate	Museum exhibit	Part of the Ramsgate Maritime Museum	5	
Challenge		Alexander Hall & Co	Aberdeen	1931		Tugboat	River Medway	Operational, Available for hire	Last steam tug to serve on the River Thames	13	
CMB 4		John I. Thornycroft & Company	Hampton	1916		Coastal Motor Boat	Boathouse 4, Portsmouth Historic Dockyard	Museum, exhibit		400	
Comrade		Warrens Shipyard	New Holland	1923		Humber keel	South Ferriby	Operational, available for hire		435	
Concord		H. King & Sons	Pinmill	1937		Sailing yacht	Fowey	Operational, available for charter		1410	
Concrete canal barge		A. H. Guest	Stourbridge	1918		Concrete canal barge	Gloucester	Museum exhibit	Part of the National Waterways Museum, Gloucester	402	
Consuta		Sam Saunders	Goring-on-Thames	1898		Umpire's launch	River Thames	Privately owned, operational	Used the consuta method of construction	87	
Coronia		Fellows & Co	Great Yarmouth	1935		Excursion vessel	Scarborough	Privately owned, operational		179	
Corrie		Alexander Robertson & Sons	Dunoon	1908	Clyde 30 Racing Yacht	Yacht	Gosport	Operational, Private		1383	
Cutty Sark		Scott & Linton	Dumbarton	1869		Clipper	London - Greenwich	Restored and open to the public following fire and renovation	The world's last tea clipper	438	
Daniel Adamson		Tranmere Bay Development Co.	Birkenhead	1903		Passenger tug	Liverpool	Owned by charitable trust, operational	Formerly named Ralph Brocklebank. Renamed after Daniel Adamson	15	
Discovery		Dundee Shipbuilders Company	Dundee	1901		Polar Research Ship	Dundee	Floating museum		39	
Dolly				1850		Steam launch	Windermere Jetty: Museum of Boats, Steam and Stories	Museum exhibit		19	
Doris		John & Herbert Cann	Harwich	1909		Thames bawley	Gillingham, Kent	Private, operational		791	
Duessa		James A Silver Ltd	Rosneath	1935		Motor launch	Walton-on-the-Naze	Private, operational		1381	
Edmund Gardner		Philip and Son	Dartmouth, Devon	1953		Pilot Cutter	Liverpool - Merseyside Maritime Museum	Museum, dry berth		444	
Elswick II				1913		Dumb lighter	South Shields	Laid up		445	
Esperance		T.B. Seath & Co.	Rutherglen	1869		Saloon launch	Windermere Jetty: Museum of Boats, Steam and Stories	Museum exhibit		446	
Esther		James Collinson	Grimsby	1888		Grimsby smack	Grimsby	Museum exhibit, undergoing restoration	Part of the National Fishing Heritage Centre	170	
Eva		J. I. Thornycroft & Co Ltd	Chiswick	1874		Saloon launch	Henley-on-Thames	Museum exhibit	Part of the River and Rowing Museum	25	
Excellent		J & G Forbes	Sandhaven	1931	Drifter	Fishing boat	Penzance, Cornwall	In commercial use	Oldest wooden fishing boat in commercial use	154	
Excelsior		John Chambers & Co	Lowestoft	1921	Lowestoft Sailing Smack	Trawler	Lowestoft	Training ship		447	
FCB 18		Wates Building Group	Barrow in Furness	1944		Concrete lighter	Ellesmere Port	Museum exhibit	Part of the National Waterways Museum, Ellesmere Port	1390	
Feasible		John Duthie	Aberdeen	1912		Steam fishing drifter	Penzance	Private ownership, undergoing restoration		711	
Friendship		Sephtons	Sutton Stop, Coventry	1925		Narrow boat	Ellesmere Port	Museum exhibit	Part of the National Waterways Museum, Ellesmere Port	449	
Garlandstone		James Goss	Calstock	1903		Tamar Ketch	Morwellham Quay	Abandoned		136	
George		Wigan Coal and Iron Company	New Springs, Wigan	1910		Leeds & Liverpool Shortboat	Ellesmere Port	Museum exhibit	Part of the National Waterways Museum, Ellesmere Port	451	
Gifford		William Nurser	Braunston	1926		Horse-drawn canal barge	Ellesmere Port	Museum exhibit	Part of the National Waterways Museum, Ellesmere Port	452	
Gladys		John & Herbert Cann	Harwich	1901		Thames sailing barge	River Thames	Private ownership		204	
Glala		A. R. Luke & Sons	River Hamble	1915		Motor yacht	Ipswich	Private ownership		204	
Glenlee		Anderson Rodger and Co	Port Glasgow	1896	Barque	Cargo vessel	Glasgow - Yorkhill Quay	Museum		450	
Golden Vanity		Sanders & Co	Galmpton	1908		Brixham trawler	Brixham	Private ownership	Used for sail training	1673	
Governor		Harris Brothers	Netherton	1941		Narrow boat	Walsall	Private ownership		457	
Grab No. 1		Blyth Shipbuilding Company	Blyth, Northumberland	1927		Grab dredger	Blyth, Northumberland	Private ownership		1391	
Great Britain		William Patterson Shipbuilders	Wapping Wharf, Bristol	1843		Passenger ship	Bristol Harbour	Museum		76	
Greta		Stone Brothers	Brightlingsea	1891		Thames sailing barge	Blyth, Northumberland	Private ownership	One of the "Little Ships of Dunkirk"	206	
Gularis		Staniland & Company	Thorne	1938		Motor yacht	Newark-on-Trent	Private ownership		1399	
H21		Royal Engineers	Richborough, Kent	1918		Seaplane lighter	Yeovilton	Museum exhibit, undergoing restoration	Part of the Fleet Air Arm Museum	712	
H F Bailey		Groves & Gutteridge Ltd	Cowes	1935	Watson class	Lifeboat	Cromer	Museum exhibit	Part of the RNLI Henry Blogg Museum	1446	
Harriet		Singleton Brothers	Wyre Dock, Fleetwood	1893		Fishing smack	Fleetwood	Museum exhibit, undergoing conservation	Part of Fleetwood Museum	638	
Hathor		Daniel S. Hall	Reedham, Norfolk	1905		Pleasure wherry	Wroxham	Private ownership, awaiting restoration	Owned by Wherry Yacht Charter Charitable Trust	453	
Hen		Cochrane & Sons	Selby	1925		Dumb lighter	Liverpool	Private ownership		561	
Herbert Leigh		J. Samuel White, & Co Ltd	East Cowes, Isle of Wight	1951	Watson class	Lifeboat	Barrow-in-Furness	Museum exhibit	Part of the Dock Museum	561	
HMS Alliance		Vickers Armstrong	Barrow-in-Furness	1945	Amphion class	Submarine	Gosport	Museum/Memorial	Part of the Royal Navy Submarine Museum	100	
HMS Belfast		Harland & Wolff	Belfast	1938	Town class	Light cruiser	London - Port of London	Museum/Memorial	Part of the Imperial War Museum	123	
HMS Caroline		Cammell Laird	Birkenhead	1914	C class	Light cruiser	Belfast - Port of Belfast	Museum ship	Part of the National Museum of the Royal Navy	430	
HMS Cavalier		J. Samuel White, & Co Ltd	East Cowes, Isle of Wight	1943	C class	Destroyer	Chatham Historic Dockyard	Museum ship		431	
HMS Gannet		Sheerness Dockyard	Sheerness	1878		Sloop	Chatham Historic Dockyard	Museum		505	
HMS Medusa (A353)		R A Newman & Sons	Poole, Dorset	1943		Harbour Defence Motor Launch	Southampton	Museum		522	
HMS President		Lobnitz & Company	Renfrew	1917	Anchusa class	Sloop	Thames Embankment	Private ownership		494	
HMS Trincomalee		Wadia Shipyard	Bombay, India	1816	Leda class	Frigate	Hartlepool's Maritime Experience	Museum		497	
HMS Unicorn		Chatham Dockyard	Chatham, Kent	1824	Leda class	Frigate	Dundee	Museum		498	
HMS Victory		Chatham Dockyard	Chatham, Kent	1765		Ship of the line	Portsmouth - Royal Naval Museum, HMNB Portsmouth	Museum	Oldest commissioned naval ship in the world	499	
HMS Warrior		Thames Ironworks and Shipbuilding Company	Leamouth	1860		Ironclad	Portsmouth	Museum		501	
HMS Holland 1		Vickers, Sons & Maxim	Barrow-in-Furness	1901	Holland class	Submarine	Gosport - Royal Navy Submarine Museum	Museum		427	
HSL 102		British Power Boat Company	Hythe, Hampshire	1936	100 class	High Speed Rescue Launch	Portsmouth - Gunwharf Quays	On display and available for charter	Last remaining boat of her class	525	
HSL 376		Hancock Shipbuilding	Pembroke Dock	1944		Naval Harbour Service Launch	Chatham Historic Dockyard	Museum exhibit		41	
Humber		British Power Boat Company	Hythe, Hampshire	1945		RASC fast launch	Oulton Broad	Stored, undergoing restoration		542	
Hurlingham		Salter Brothers	Oxford	1915		Thames excursion steamer	Lambeth	Private, operational		257	
Ironsides		Stanfield and Clarke	Grays	1900		Thames sailing barge	Faversham	Private, undergoing restoration		470	
Isabella Fortuna		James Weir	Arbroath	1890		Fifie	Wick	Museum, operational		705	
James Stevens No 14		Thames Ironworks and Shipbuilding Company	Blackwall, London	1900	Norfolk and Suffolk class	Lifeboat	Walton-on-the-Naze	Owned by heritage trust, operational		1279	
Janet		J. Samuel White, & Co Ltd	East Cowes, Isle of Wight	1892		Admiral's barge	Windermere	Privately owned		31	
Jesse Lumb		J Samuel White & Co	Cowes, Isle of Wight	1939	Watson class	Lifeboat	Imperial War Museum Duxford	Museum exhibit		1759	
John Constable				1880		Stour barge	Sudbury	Museum, operational	Owned by the River Stour Trust	1759	
John H Amos		Bow, McLachlan and Company	Paisley, Scotland	1931		Tugboat	Chatham, Kent	Laid up on barge		33	
Kathleen and May		Ferguson and Baird	Connah's Quay, Flintshire	1900		Schooner	Bideford, Devon	Operational, Up For Sale	Last remaining wooden hull three masted top sail schooner	146	
Kent		Richards Ironworks Co.	Lowestoft	1948		Tugboat	Chatham, Kent	Operational		1937	
Kerne		Montrose Ship Building Company Ltd.	Montrose	1912		Tugboat	Liverpool	Private, operational		34	
Kindly Light		Armour Brothers	Fleetwood	1911		Pilot Cutter	Gweek	Under restoration		472	
Kingfisher		J. Samuel White, & Co Ltd	East Cowes, Isle of Wight	1928		Inspection launch	Yardley Gobion	Privately owned, operational		1380	
Kingswear Castle		Philip and Son	Dartmouth, Devon	1924		Paddle Steamer	Dartmouth	Operational		35	
Kyles		John Fullarton & Co.	Paisley	1872		Motor coaster	Irvine	Museum exhibit	Part of the Scottish Maritime Museum	473	
Lady Charlotte		J. Crichton & Company	Saltney	1914		Saloon launch	Henley-on-Thames	Operational, privately owned		27	
Lady Daphne		Short Brothers	Rochester, Kent	1923		Thames sailing barge	St Katharine Docks	Privately owned, up for sale		210	
Lady of the Lake		T.B. Seath & Co.	Rutherglen	1877		Excursion steamer	Ullswater	Operational in commercial service	Member of the Ullswater 'Steamers' fleet	375	
Lamouette		Portsmouth Dockyard	Portsmouth	1937		Naval pinnace	Ramsgate	Operational, privately owned		643	
Largo Law		James N Miller & Sons	St Monans	1924		Pilot vessel	Charlestown	Private ownership		1620	
LCT 7074		Hawthorn Leslie	Hebburn	1944	Landing Craft Tank	Landing Craft	Portsmouth	Refloated from Birkenhead docks and transported to Portsmouth for renovation		713	
Leader		A. W. Gibb	Galmpton	1892		Brixham trawler	Brixham	Owned by charitable trust as a sail training ship		604	
Light Vessel 12 Spurn		Goole Shipbuilding and Repairing Co Ltd	Goole	1927		Lightship	Kingston upon Hull	Museum ship		671	
Light Vessel 16 Inner Dowsing		William Pitcher	Northfleet	1840		Lightship	Rochester, Kent	Private ownership		131	
Light Vessel 50 H.Y. Tyne		Fletcher, Son & Fearnall	London	1879		Lightship	Blyth, Northumberland	Private ownership	Headquarters of the Royal Northumberland Yacht Club	141	
Light Vessel 91 Humber		Philip and Son	Dartmouth, Devon	1937		Lightship	Swansea	Floating museum	Part of Swansea Museum	137	
Lively Hope		William Weatherhead & Son	Cockenzie	1936	Ring-Netter	Fishing boat	Anstruther	Museum exhibit	Part of the Scottish Fisheries Museum	1856	
Lydia Eva		King's Lynn Slipway Company	King's Lynn	1930		Fishing boat, Herring drifter	Great Yarmouth	Operational, Museum	The world's last surviving steam-powered herring drifter.	43	
Lynher		James Goss	Calstock	1896		Tamar barge	Cremyll	Privately owned, up for sale		1137	
M33		Workman, Clark and Company	Belfast	1915	M29 class	Monitor	Portsmouth - Portsmouth Historic Dockyard	Museum		482	
Madcap		Davis & Plain	Cardiff	1875		Bristol Channel Pilot Cutter	Carrickfergus	Up for sale		91	
Maid of the Loch		A. & J. Inglis	Glasgow	1953		Paddle steamer	Balloch, Loch Lomond	Under restoration		477	
Maidie		Ernest Collins and Sons (Wroxham) Ltd.	Wroxham	1904		Broads yacht	Wroxham	Operational, privately owned		1934	
Marbury				1900		Towed canal icebreaker	Ellesmere Port	Museum exhibit	Part of the National Waterways Museum, Ellesmere Port	478	
Maria		Harris Brothers	Rowhedge	1866		Fishing smack	Brightlingsea	Private, operating		718	
Mary Joseph		William Paynter	Kilkeel	1877		Fishing lugger	Belfast	Laid up	Part of the Ulster Folk and Transport Museum	479	
Mary Rose			Portsmouth	1511		Carrack	Portsmouth	Museum exhibit, preserved wreck	Part of Portsmouth Historic Dockyard	1951	
Mascotte		Thomas Cox & Son	Newport, Wales	1904		Pilot cutter	Arisaig	Privately owned, available for charter		689	
Massey Shaw		J. Samuel White, & Co Ltd	East Cowes, Isle of Wight	1935		Fireboat	Deptford	Owned by a charitable trust, under restoration		417	
Maud		D. S. Hall	Reedham	1899		Trading wherry	Ludham	Operational, privately owned		650	
May		John & Herbert Cann	Harwich	1891		Thames sailing barge	Ipswich	Operational, privately owned		214	
Mayflower		Stothert & Marten	Bristol	1861		Tugboat	Bristol harbour	Floating museum	Part of M Shed	45	
Medway Queen		Ailsa Shipbuilding Company	Troon	1924		Paddle steamer	Gillingham, Kent	Owned by preservation society, under restoration	One of the "Little Ships of Dunkirk"	46	
Merak		W. H. Walker & Brothers	Rickmansworth	1936		Narrow boat	Ellesmere Port	Museum exhibit	Part of the National Waterways Museum, Ellesmere Port	481	
Merope		W. H. Walker & Brothers	Rickmansworth	1936		Narrow boat	Ellesmere Port	Museum exhibit	Part of the National Waterways Museum, Ellesmere Port	1805	
MGB 81		British Power Boat Company	Hythe, Hampshire	1942		Motor Gun Boat	Portsmouth	Operational	Acquired by Portsmouth Historic Dockyard	524	
Mirosa		John Howard	Maldon	1892		Thames sailing barge	Faversham - Iron Wharf	Operational, preserved		215	
MTB 102		Vospers	Portsmouth	1937		Motor Torpedo Boat	Lowestoft	Owned by a trust		486	
My Alice		Kidby & Sons	Brightlingsea	1907		Smack	Brightlingsea	Operational, privately owned		1965	
Nell		Thomas Orr Junior	Greenock	1887		Yacht	Dover	Operational, privately owned		762	
Nomadic		Harland & Wolff	Belfast	1910		Passenger Tender	Belfast	Museum	Built to ferry passengers from Cherbourg to RMS Olympic and RMS Titanic. Last surviving ship built for White Star Line.	2053	
North Carr		A. & J. Inglis	Glasgow	1932		Lightship	Dundee	Awaiting Restoration	Owned by Dundee City Council	613	
Olga		J Bowden	Porthleven	1909		Pilot Cutter	Swansea	Floating museum	Part of Swansea Museum	615	
Olive		Ernest Collins & Sons (Wroxham) Ltd	Wroxham	1909		Norfolk wherry yacht	Wroxham	Undergoing restoration	Owned by Wherry Yacht Charter Charitable Trust	489	
Our Boys		Richard Pearce	East Looe	1904		Cornish lugger	Milford Haven	Privately owned, undergoing restoration		117	
Panurgic		J. S. Watson (Gainsborough) Ltd	Gainsborough	1935		Hopper barge	Appledore	Privately owned, up for sale		653	
Pauline				1869	Calder & Hebble Keel	Mobile residence	Yorkshire	Privately owned		1392	
Peacock		Fellows Morton & Clayton	Saltley Dock, Birmingham	1915		Narrowboat	Dudley	Floating museum	Displayed at the Black Country Living Museum	1396	
Peggy		Unknown		1789		Yacht	Castletown, Isle of Man	Stored, undercover		1125	
Perseverance		James Pollock & Sons Ltd	Faversham	1934		Grab dredger	Ellesmere Port	Museum exhibit	Part of the National Waterways Museum, Ellesmere Port	52	
Pilgrim		J. W. & A. Upham	Brixham	1895		Brixham trawler	Dartmouth	Operational, owned by a preservation trust		1816	
Pioneer		W. Paynter	St Ives, Cornwall	1899		Longline fishing vessel	Hayle	Privately owned, Restored		1409	
Portwey		Harland and Wolff	River Clyde	1927	Service Vessel	Tugboat	West India Docks	Operational		54	
President		Fellows Morton & Clayton	Saltley Dock, Birmingham	1909		Narrowboat	Dudley	Floating museum	Displayed at the Black Country Living Museum	55	
Primrose		William Evans Clark	Rye, East Sussex	1887		Rye sailing barge	Hastings	Museum exhibit	Part of the Shipwreck Heritage Museum	618	
Prince Frederick's Barge		John Hall	South Bank	1732		State Barge	London - National Maritime Museum, Greenwich	Museum exhibit		617	
Provident		Saunders & Co.	Galmpton	1924		Brixham trawler	Brixham	Owned by charitable trust as a sail training ship		616	
Pyronaut		Charles Hill & Sons	Bristol	1934		Fireboat	Bristol - Bristol Harbour Railway and Industrial Museum	Floating museum		619	
Queen Mary		William Denny and Brothers	Dumbarton	1933		Passenger vessel	Greenock	Undergoing restoration		495	
Queen Mary's Shallop				1689		Shallop	Greenwich	Museum exhibit	Part of the National Maritime Museum	1860	
Queen of the Lake		Watercraft of Molesey	Molesey	1949		Launch	Windermere	Operational, in commercial service		368	
Ratho Princess		Graham Bunn	Wroxham	1924		Excursion steamer	Ratho	Operational, in commercial service		389	
Raven		T.B. Seath & Co.	Rutherglen	1889		Excursion steamer	Ullswater	Operational, in commercial service	Member of the Ullswater 'Steamers' fleet	376	
Raven		T.B. Seath & Co.	Rutherglen	1871		Steam barge	Windermere Jetty: Museum of Boats, Steam and Stories	Museum exhibit		57	
Reaper		J & G Forbes Ltd	Sandhaven	1901		Fifie	Anstruther	Operational, Museum ship	Part of the Scottish Fisheries Museum	172	
Regal Lady		Fellows & Co	Great Yarmouth	1930		Excursion vessel	Scarborough	Operational, in commercial service	One of the "Little Ships of Dunkirk"	180	
Reminder		F. W. Horlock	Mistley	1929		Thames sailing barge	Maldon, Essex	Operational, in commercial service		1966	
Research		W. & G. Stephen	Banff	1903	Zulu	Fishing drifter	Anstruther	Museum exhibit	Part of the Scottish Fisheries Museum	173	
Result		Robert Kent & Company	Carrickfergus	1893		Schooner	Cultra	Museum exhibit	Part of the Ulster Folk and Transport Museum	496	
Ripple		John Howard	Maldon	1878		Smack yacht	Tollesbury	Operational, in private ownership		770	
RML 497		Southampton Steam Joinery Ltd	Southampton	1941	Fairmile B	Motor launch	Portsmouth	Museum ship	Part of the National Museum of the Royal Navy	307	
Robin		Mackenzie, MacAlpine & Co	Leamouth	1890		Coastal Steamer	London - Royal Victoria Dock	Floating museum		1794	
Ryde		William Denny and Brothers	Dumbarton	1936		Paddle steamer	Newport, Isle of Wight	Laid up		61	
Sabrina		Fielding & Platt Ltd	Gloucester	1870		Inspection Launch	Saul Junction, Frampton-on-Severn	Private: operating		62	
Sabrina 5		Charles Hill & Sons	Bristol	1944		Barge	Gloucester	Floating museum	Part of the National Waterways Museum, Gloucester	623	
Sails of Dawn		McGruer & Co	Clynder	1969		Ocean racing and cruising yacht	Malta - Manoel Island	Under restoration		3661	
Sallie		Aldous & Sons	Brightlingsea	1907		Oyster smack	Maldon, Essex	Operational, privately owned		831	
Seagull II		Gill & Sons	Rochester, Kent	1901		Thames sailing barge	Gillingham, Kent	Privately owned, laid up, undergoing restoration		832	
Severn Progress		Charles Hill & Sons	Bristol	1931		Tugboat	Gloucester	Floating museum	Part of the National Waterways Museum, Gloucester	1448	
Shamrock		Nathaniel Shepherd	Bowness-on-Windermere	1906		Saloon launch	Windermere	Operational, owned by a charitable trust		65	
Sharpness		Abdela & Mitchell	Brimscombe	1908		Icebreaking tug	Trent and Mersey Canal	Operational, privately owned		246	
Shieldhall		Lobnitz & Company	Renfrew	1955		Sewage Disposal vessel	Southampton	Operational, Private		66	
Sir Walter Scott		William Denny and Brothers	Dumbarton	1900		Excursion steamer	Loch Katrine	Operational, in commercial service		67	
Solace		D. S. Hall	Reedham	1903		Norfolk pleasure wherry	Wroxham	Operational, privately owned		666	
Souvenir D'Antan		C. & A. Burgoine	Hampton Wick	1901		Saloon launch	Windermere	Operational, privately owned		68	
Spartan		J Hay & Sons	Kirkintilloch	1940	Victualling Inshore Craft	Clyde puffer	Irvine, North Ayrshire	Museum exhibit	Part of the Scottish Maritime Museum	622	
Spider T		Warrens Shipyard	New Holland, North Lincolnshire	1926		Humber Super Sloop	Keadby Lock	Operational, privately owned		2010	
ST 1500		British Power Boat Company	Hythe, Hampshire	1942		Seaplane tender	Dumbarton	Privately owned, undergoing restoration		1223	
Steam Pinnace 199		J. Samuel White, & Co Ltd	East Cowes, Isle of Wight	1911		Naval pinnace	Portsmouth	Museum exhibit	Floating exhibit at the National Museum of the Royal Navy, Portsmouth	40	
Stormy Petrel		R & C Perkins	Whitstable	1890		Oyster Smack	Gillingham, Kent	Private, operating		840	
Sundowner		Sheerness Dockyard	Sheerness	1912		Naval pinnace	Ramsgate	Museum ship	Part of the Ramsgate Maritime Museum. One of the "Little Ships of Dunkirk"	96	
Swan		Vickers-Armstrongs	Barrow-in-Furness	1938		Excursion vessel	Windermere	Operational, in commercial service	Member of the Windermere Lake Cruises fleet	377	
Swan		Hay & Co. Ltd.	Lerwick	1900		Fifie	Lerwick	Operational, owned by charitable trust		672	
Tahilla		John I. Thornycroft & Company	Hampton	1922		Cruise boat	Southampton	Operational, privately owned		552	
Teal		Vickers-Armstrongs	Barrow-in-Furness	1936		Excursion vessel	Windermere	Operational, privately owned	Member of the Windermere Lake Cruises fleet	379	
Telegraph		Alexander M. Gostelow	Boston, Lincolnshire	1906		Boston smack	Maldon	Operational, privately owned		1457	
Tern		Forrestt & Sons Ltd	Wivenhoe	1891		Excursion vessel	Windermere	Operational, privately owned	Member of the Windermere Lake Cruises fleet	380	
Thalatta		W. B. McLearon	Harwich	1906		Thames sailing barge	St Osyth	Operational, owned by a charitable trust	Used for sail training	230	
Thalia		G. F. Wanhill	Poole	1889		Cutter	Southampton	Operational, privately owned		844	
Thames Esperanza		J. Bond	Maidenhead	1898		Saloon launch	River Thames	Operational, privately owned		94	
The King		H. Tagg	East Molesey	1902		Excursion vessel	Borstal, Rochester	Laid up		241	
Thomas		Cochrane & Sons Ltd.	Selby	1937		Tugboat	Port Talbot	Privately owned		679	
TID 164		William Pickersgill & Sons	Southwick, Sunderland	1945	TID class	Tugboat	Chatham Historic Dockyard	Privately owned		70	
Torbay Lass		R. Jackman & Sons	Brixham	1923		Brixham trawler	Maldon	Undergoing restoration	Owned by the Heritage Marine Foundation	95	
Trimilia		Saunders-Roe	Cowes, Isle of Wight	1925	Ramsgate class	Lifeboat	Ipswich	Privately owned		461	
Turbinia		Parsons Marine Steam Turbine Company	Heaton	1894			Newcastle upon Tyne - Discovery Museum	Museum exhibit	Original engine at Science Museum	138	
VIC 32		Richard Dunston	Thorne	1943		Victualling Inshore Craft	Crinan, Argyll and Bute	Operational, in commercial service		75	
VIC 96		Richard Dunston	Thorne	1945		Victualling Inshore Craft	Chatham, Kent	Undergoing restoration, owned by a charitable trust		78	
Vigilance		J. W. & A. Upham	Brixham	1926		Brixham trawler	Brixham	Operational, privately owned		741	
Vigilant		Cox & Company	Falmouth	1901		Customs cutter	Faversham	Under restoration		500	
Violette		J. Pollock & Son, Co. Ltd.	Faversham	1919		Coasting schooner	Hoo	Laid up		716	
Waterlily		John I. Thornycroft & Company	Chiswick	1866		Steam launch	Falmouth	Museum exhibit	Part of the National Maritime Museum Cornwall	81	
Waverley		A & J Inglis	Pointhouse, River Clyde	1946		Paddle Steamer	Firth of Clyde	Operational		90	
Wellington		Devonport Dockyard	Devonport, Devon	1934	Grimsby class	Sloop	Victoria Embankment	Private ownership	Former headquarters of the Honourable Company of Master Mariners	502	
White Heather		J. S. Watson (Gainsborough) Ltd.	Gainsborough	1932		Canal Tug	Woking	Operational, privately owned		1657	
Willdora			Scotland	1901		Fishing trawler	Sunderland	Undergoing restoration, owned by a charitable trust	One of the "Little Ships of Dunkirk"	1858	
William Gammon		Groves & Gutteridge Ltd	Cowes, Isle of Wight	1947	Watson class	Lifeboat	Swansea	Museum exhibit	Part of Swansea Museum	723	
Wingfield Castle		William Gray & Company	Hartlepool	1934		Paddle ferry	Hartlepool	Museum ship		83	
Xylonite		F. W. Horlock	Mistley	1926		Thames sailing barge	Maylandsea	Operational, available for charter		236	
Zetland		Henry Greathead	South Shields	1802		Lifeboat	Redcar	Museum	Oldest lifeboat in the world	627	

== See also ==
- Barcelona Charter – International standard for watercraft restoration
