= Waterlily (Steam Launch) =

Historic steam launch

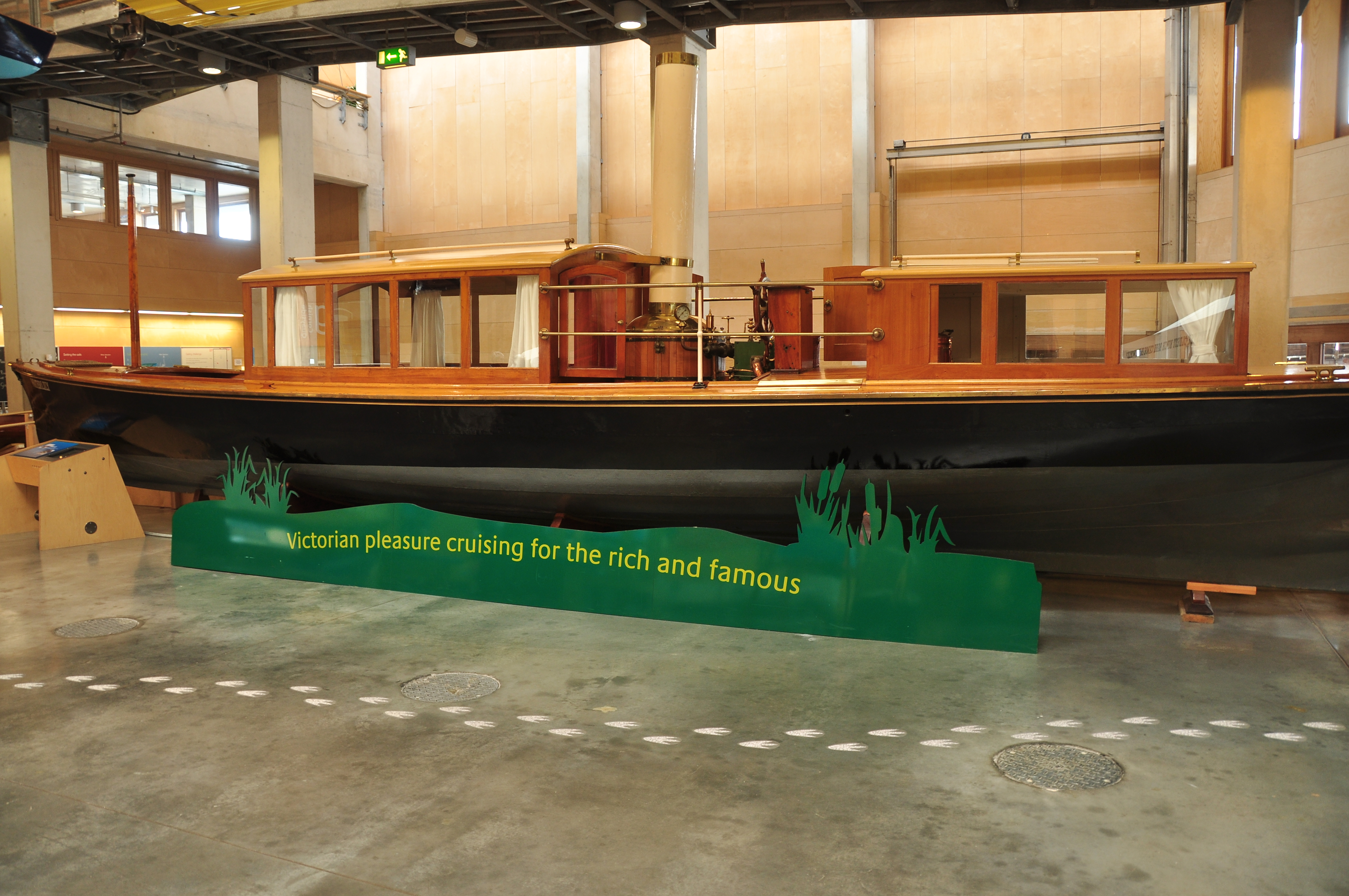
- Waterlily in the National Maritime Museum Cornwall

History

United Kingdom
- Name: Waterlily
- Namesake: Waterlily
- Owner: Thomas Thornycroft (1866–1885); Thornycroft family (1885–1990s); National Maritime Museum Cornwall (1990s–present)
- Operator: John I. Thornycroft & Company (Chiswick)
- Ordered: 1866
- Builder: John I. Thornycroft & Company
- Launched: 1866
- Acquired: 1990s (presented by the Thornycroft family)
- In service: 1866–1940s
- Identification: National Historic Ships Certificate no. 81
- Fate: Currently a static museum exhibit.

General characteristics
- Type: Steam launch
- Tonnage: 5.5 tons
- Length: 42 ft (12.8 m)
- Beam: 7.5 ft (2.3 m)
- Draught: 1.6 ft (0.5 m)
- Decks: 1
- Installed power: 1 × Inverted vertical single-cylinder steam engine by Thornycroft (non-original); 1 × Coal-fired vertical fire tube boiler by J.O. Lugg & Son Ltd (1977)
- Propulsion: 1 × screw propeller

SL Waterlily is a steam launch currently located in the National Maritime Museum Cornwall. Built in 1866, she is one of the oldest mechanically powered vessels in the world. She is now a museum exhibit and a member of the National Historic Fleet.

== History ==
=== Construction and early service ===
Waterlily was designed and built in 1866 by the naval engineer John Isaac Thornycroft at his yard in Chiswick. She was the fifth vessel he had built and was commissioned for his father Thomas Thornycroft.

The vessel was an advancement over other vessels constructed at the time because of its riveted wrought iron hull, which contrasted with the customary wooden hull used in Thames pleasure launches. She was composed of a unique five-deep-web frame longitudinal framework and bulkheads. This structural design inspired future Thornycroft patrol boats.

In 1919 her original steam plant was removed, and she was converted to internal combustion power to continue to serve as a private motor launch for the Thornycroft family.

=== Later service ===
In 1951, Waterlily participated in the Festival of Britain on the River Thames.

After falling into a state of disrepair due to less use by the Thornycroft family, she was restored from 1977 to 1978. Restoration work on the ship was carried out by apprentices working for the company Vosper Thornycroft (UK) Ltd. During the restoration process, it was equipped with a steam engine made up of a vertical fire-tube boiler, produced by J.O. Lugg & Son Ltd.

Waterlily was maintained as a heritage craft until 2007, when she was formally presented to the National Maritime Museum Cornwall by the Thornycroft family. She was placed into dry dock as a museum exhibit, where she remains today.

== See also ==
- Dolly (Steam Launch)
- National Historic Fleet
- Steam Launch
- John Isaac Thornycroft
