= Tamar barge =

Type of boat

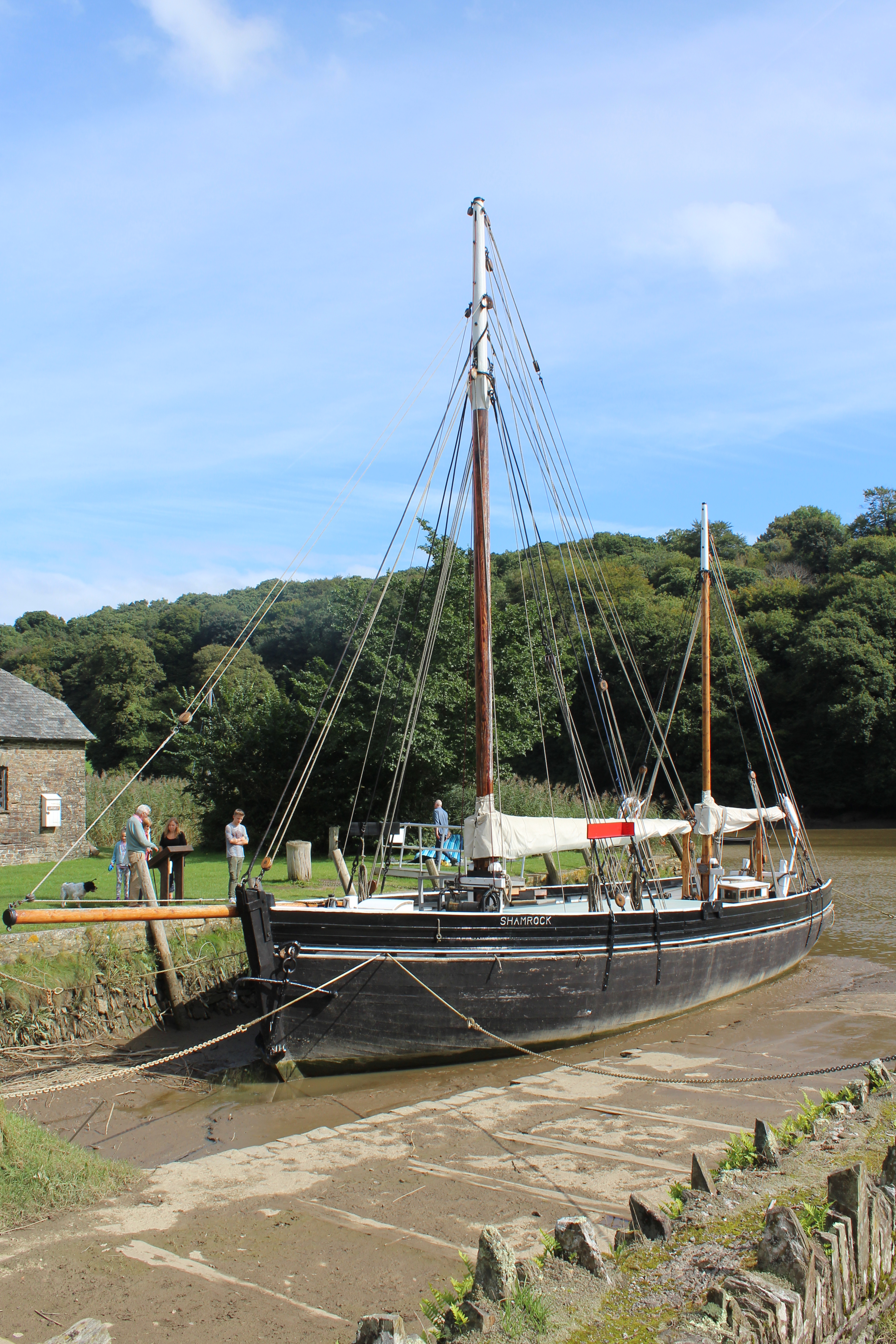
Shamrock berthed at Cotehele Quay, on the Cotehele Estate in Cornwall

A Tamar barge is a masted sailing vessel, designed for carrying cargo along the River Tamar and the south coast of Cornwall.

The Tamar barge can be either a single or double masted vessel. It can carry up to 32 tonnes. Tamar barges were manufactured in the 19th century in the Tamar Valley by boatbuilders such as James Goss of Calstock, Frederick Hawke of Stonehouse, Plymouth and David Banks of Queen Anne's Battery in Sutton Harbour, Plymouth.

There are only two surviving Tamar barges, both have been almost completely restored. Normally one, Shamrock, is open to visitors at Cotehele Quay and the other, Lynher, is privately owned and moored at Cremyll.

Shamrock is currently undergoing extensive repairs due to lack of maintenance which had led to mould and rot spreading throughout the timbers. The National Trust has launched a fundraising campaign to pay for the repairs to the historic vessel.

== List of known Tamar Barges ==
Vessel	Image	Length	Sail Plan	Builder	Date	Place	Fate	Ref
Annie		55.7 ft	Cutter	Frederick Hawke	1899	Stonehouse, Plymouth	Abandoned at Hooe Lake	
Bertie		46.2 ft	Sloop	David Banks and Co.	1883	Queen Annes Battery, Plymouth	Abandoned in 1928 at Hooe Lake	
Commerce		Unknown	Cutter	Unknown	Unknown	Unknown	Unknown	
Edith		54.9 ft	Cutter	Unknown	c1890	Unknown	Unknown	
Edward & Sarah		Unknown	Cutter	Edward Brooming	Unknown	Calstock, Devon	Unknown	
Edwin		55.1 ft	Unknown	Richard Hill & Sons	1880	Cattedown, Plymouth	Abandoned in 1924, partly broken up, at Pomphlett Creek	
Elizabeth Jane		Unknown	Cutter	Unknown	Unknown	Unknown	Abandoned at Antony Passage	
Flora May		50.5 ft	Cutter	Frederick Hawke	1897	Stonehouse, Plymouth	Operated between Danescombe Quay and Plymouth; Later abandoned at Saltash	
Gwendoline		Unknown	Unknown	David Banks and Co.	1894	Queen Annes Battery, Plymouth	Unknown	
Kate		54 ft	Cutter	Frederick Hawke	1885	Stonehouse, Plymouth	Unknown	
Lillie		55 ft	Sloop	James Goss	1899	Calstock, Devon	Unknown	
Industry		40 ft	Sloop	Edward Brooming	1880	Calstock, Devon	Unknown	
Lynher		51.2 ft	Cutter	James Goss	1896	Calstock, Devon	Abandoned in the 1950s at Poldrissick Quay; Restored in 1999 by Charlie Force; Currently Operational	
Martin		Unknown	Cutter	Unknown	Unknown	Unknown	Unknown	
Mayblossom		58.7 ft	Sloop	David Banks and Co.	1889	Queen Annes Battery, Plymouth	Unknown	
Myrtle		50.5 ft	Sloop	Robert May	1896	Danescombe Quay, Calstock, Cornwall	Bomded by the Luftwaffe during the Plymouth Blitz, sank in the Hamoaze, next to Devonport Naval Base.	
Pearl		52 ft	Cutter	Frederick Hawke	1896	Stonehouse, Plymouth	Abandoned at Hooe Lake	
Phoenix		51.9 ft	Cutter	Frederick Hawke	1900	Stonehouse, Plymouth	Unknown	
Reaper		Unknown	Unknown	Frederick Hawke	c1900	Stonehouse, Plymouth	Unknown	
Shamrock		57.5 ft	Ketch	Frederick Hawke	1899	Stonehouse, Plymouth	Abandoned in the 1960s at Hooe Lake; Restored in 1975 by the National Trust; Currently a Floating Museum	
Secret		Unknown	Unknown	Unknown	Unknown	Unknown	Unknown	
Sirdar		Unknown	Cutter	Unknown	Unknown	Unknown	Unknown	
Triumph		56.5 ft	Cutter	Frederick Hawke	1898	Stonehouse, Plymouth	Used in WWII, later abandoned at Poldrissick Quay	
Yealm		Unknown	Unknown	Moore	1878	Sutton Pool, Plymouth	Unknown	

== Surviving Tamar barges ==
- Shamrock, built in 1899 by Frederick Hawke.
- Lynher, built in 1896 by James Goss. Ship of the National Historic Fleet

== See also ==
- West Country Ketch
- Wey barge
- Cotehele House
