= Irene (ketch) =

Sailing ship built in 1907 in Bridgwater

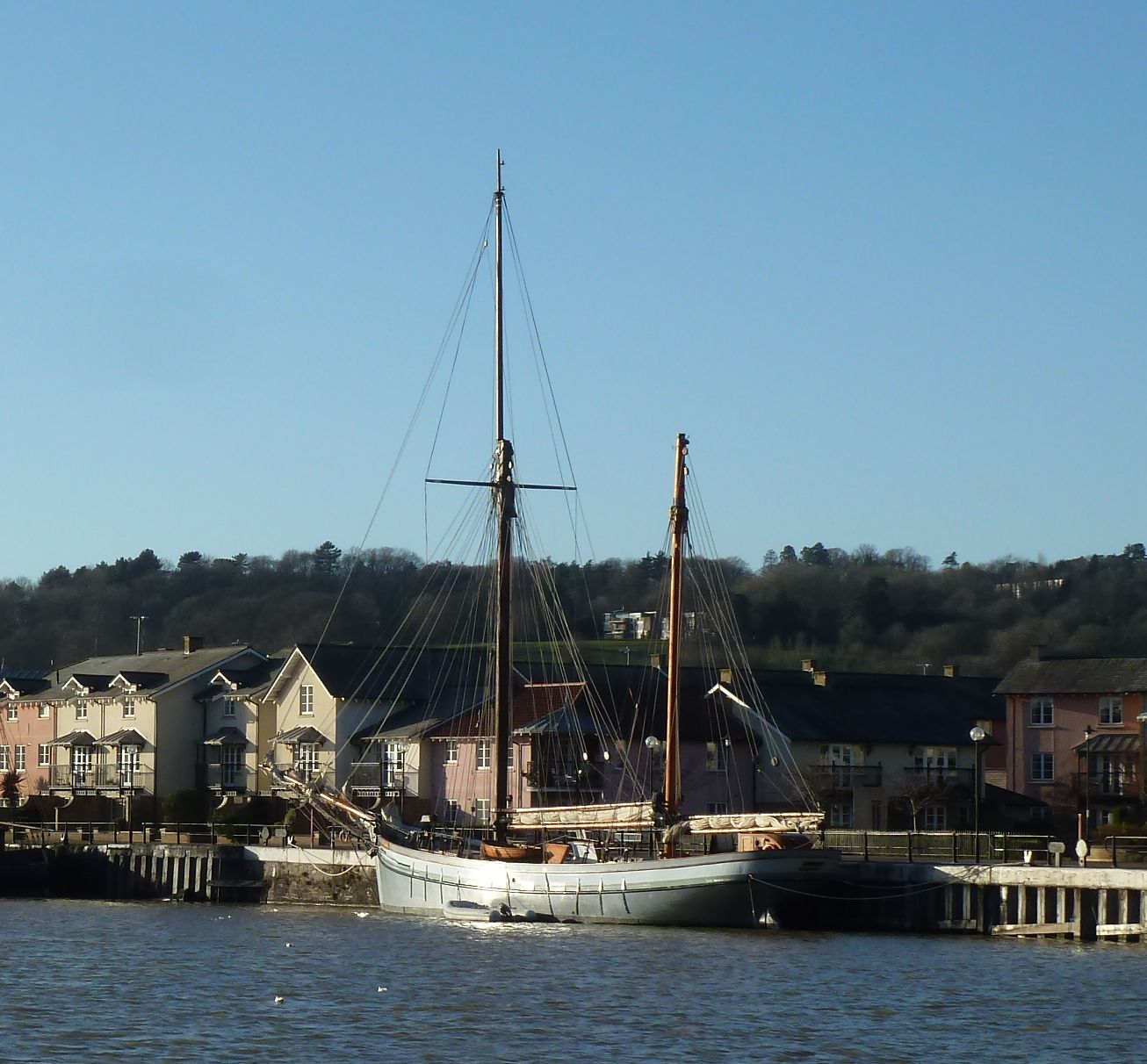
- Alongside Pooles Wharf, Bristol, January 2014

History

United Kingdom
- Name: Irene
- Owner: Symons of Bridgwater; Bridgwater Brick and Tile Company; Leslie Morrish
- Builder: FJ Carver and Son, Bridgwater
- Launched: May 1907
- Identification: Callsign MCQW; MMSI number: 235085663
- Status: Active

General characteristics
- Class & type: West Country Ketch
- Tonnage: 98 NRT
- Length: LOA 118 ft (35.97 m); LWL 85 ft (25.91 m)
- Beam: 21 ft (6.40 m)
- Draft: 10 ft (3.05 m)

Irene is a 100-foot West Country Ketch built in Bridgwater in 1907, the last ship built in the docks and the only Ketch built in the West Country still sailing. It was built by FJ Carver and Son and launched in May 1907. The Blake Museum in Bridgwater opened an exhibit about the ship in 2010.

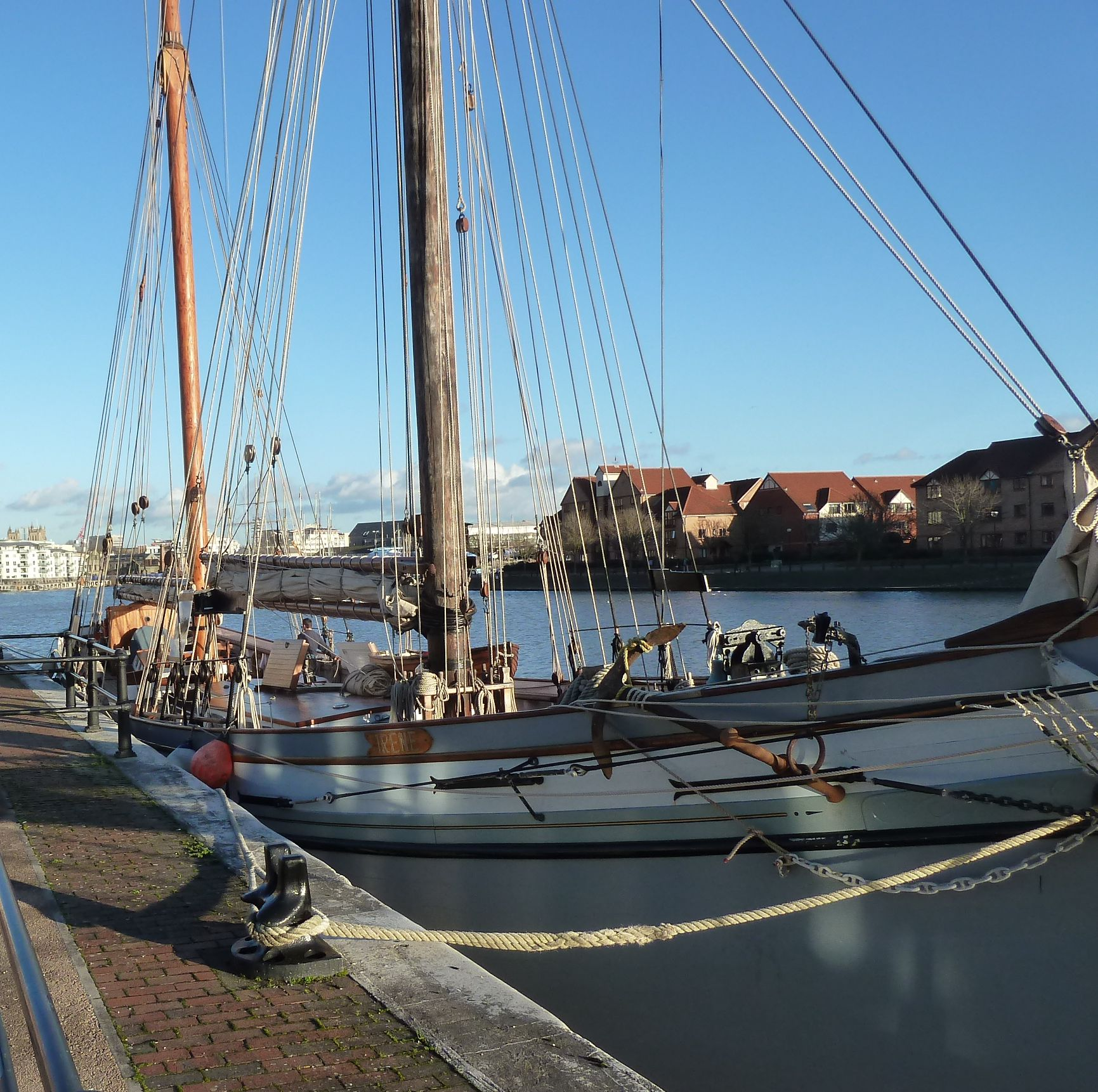
Bristol, 2014

She was first owned by Symons of Bridgwater and named after Irene Symons. For 53 years the ship was a trading vessel for bricks, tiles and other goods, mainly in the Severn estuary and to Ireland. She was owned by the Bridgwater Brick and Tile Company. The ship retired from service in the 1960s and was found derelict by Leslie Morrish, the present owner, in 1965. The ship was restored in Brentford, Middlesex, and the cargo hold was converted into quarters for 15.

The ship was a charter vessel in the Caribbean until she sank due to a fire in 2003 at Marigot, Saint Martin and was restored once more. She ran aground off Arran on the way to the Tall Ships Race in Greenock July 2011, before being refloated. The ship sailed from Plymouth with an international crew called the New Dawn Traders to promote the transport of goods by sailing ships and to take goods including beer, olive oil, cocoa and coffee over the Atlantic.
