= Peggy of Castletown =

Historic ship in the Isle of Man

Peggy
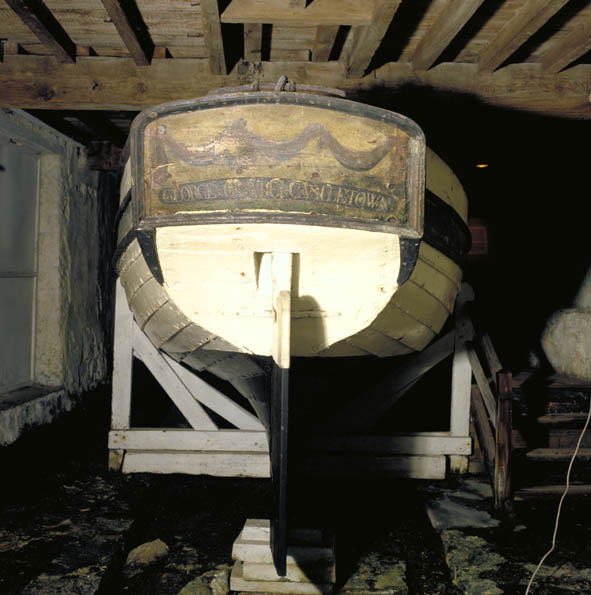
- Peggy of Castletown, Isle of Man

History

Isle of Man
- Cost: £47.3.1½
- Launched: 1789

General characteristics
- Length: 26 1/2 ft (8.1 m) (LOA)
- Beam: 7 ft 8 in (2.34 m)
- Depth: 4 ft (1.2 m)
- Sail plan: schooner rigged
- Armament: 4 cannon & 2 stern chasers

Peggy is an armed yacht built in June 1789 for George Quayle (1751–1835), MHK, a politician and banker on the Isle of Man. She is the oldest surviving Manx craft and is one of only a very few surviving vessels built in the 18th century.

For over one hundred years following Quayle's death, Peggy was interred within the boathouse he built for her, effectively forgotten. Interest in her grew during the 20th century, and after WWII she was given to the people of the Isle Man to be held in trust by Manx National Heritage. She remains preserved in the boathouse, now part of The Nautical Museum in Castletown, on the Isle of Man.

She is clinker-built and was schooner rigged with a bowsprit. A set of her spars is preserved with her, along with her armaments (six cannon and two stern chasers) and the winding gear employed to draw her into the boathouse. She is the oldest surviving schooner in the world and the oldest surviving example of the shallop hull form. She was fitted with sliding keels (progenitors of the modern daggerboard) not long after the invention of the technology by John Schank, and she is the oldest surviving example of such a vessel.

Well-known correspondence between George Quayle and his brother, in the Manx National Archive, describes an expedition in 1796 over sea and land to Windermere, Peggy's victory in a regatta there, and her perilous journey home, aided by her sliding keels.

Peggy has been surveyed three times, first by P.J. Oke in 1935 of the Society for Nautical Research (drawings now residing at the National Maritime Museum in Greenwich, London), then by Richard Cowley of Kirk Michael, Isle of Man, and most recently in 1968 by D. K. Jones at the behest of Manx National Heritage. Basil Greenhill, then Director of the National Maritime Museum, took a keen interest in her around this time. Peggy is now recognized as a vessel of international significance, which is reflected in her citation on the UK National Historic Ships Register (National Historic Fleet). Her well-documented provenance, her fine state of relative preservation, her historic location and her design all contribute to this.

== Conservation ==
Upon the death of Emily Quayle in 1935, Peggy and, in due course, George Quayle's boathouse, were bequeathed to the Manx nation. In 1950, with help from the Carnegie Trust, the Manx Museum and National Trust (as was) undertook minor restoration of the boat and boathouse and opened the site to visitors. Peggy had been resting on her starboard side against the damp ground for 150 years. Her keel, rudder and two of her lowest strakes were replaced (the original keel remains on display in the boathouse). She was then painted inside and out. Aside from at least one more repaint in the intervening years, no further work on Peggy has been done.

Peggy is remarkably well-preserved. Recent surveys indicate that all her original paint layers are intact and that well over 95% of her timbers and fixings date from the 18th century. Nonetheless, the damp conditions in the boathouse, which is subject to tidal flooding, have taken their toll. She is entirely constructed by means of iron fixings and most of her hull nails are completely mineralised (rusted). She shows signs of hogging and sagging, and is slightly deformed by the rudimentary props and frames with which, until 2013, she was supported. Her decorative paintwork is fragile and flaking.

Manx National Heritage has embarked upon a programme of conservation aimed at the stabilisation and long-term preservation of Peggy. The first step (2013) was the replacement of the props and frames with a new cradle designed with the aid of a laser survey of the hull. During 2015 the boat was removed from the boathouse, for the first time in two hundred years, for stabilisation, study, and conservation. In due course Peggy will be returned to her home in Castletown.
