= TSS T/T Calshot =

Tugboat built in 1930

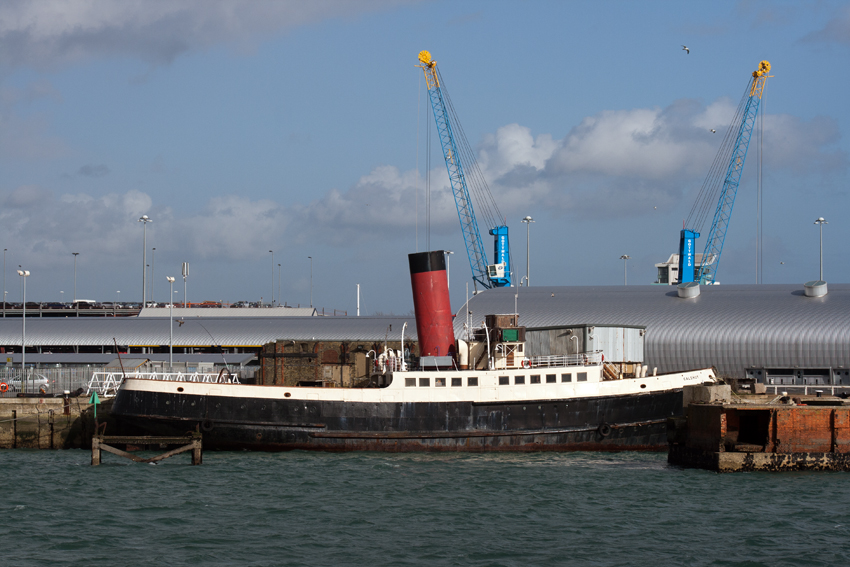
- Preserved tug Calshot moored at Southampton

History

- Name: Calshot; Galway Bay
- Owner: Red Funnel Towage (1930–1964); Port & Liner Services (Ireland) Ltd (1964–1971); Galway Ferry Services (1971–1986); Southampton City Council (1986 -1996); Tug Tender Calshot Trust (1996–2021); Woodshack Limited (2021–2022)
- Port of registry: (United Kingdom of Great Britain and Ireland) Southampton, UK (1930–1964)
- Builder: John I Thorneycroft & Co.
- Launched: 4 November 1929
- In service: 1930
- Out of service: 1986
- Identification: IMO number: 5058155
- Fate: Scrapped in 2022

General characteristics
- Class & type: Tug Tender
- Tonnage: 684 GRT; 269 NRT
- Length: 147 feet 0 inches (44.81 m)
- Beam: 33 feet 1 inch (10.08 m)
- Installed power: 1500 bhp
- Propulsion: Triple expansion steam engine, twin screw propellers; Replaced in 1964 by twin diesels
- Capacity: 566 passengers

TSS T/T Calshot was a tug tender built in 1929 by John I Thornycroft & Co, and completed in 1930 for the Red Funnel Line. Calshot was one of only three surviving classical tender ships which served the great ocean liners, another example is the SS Nomadic, which tendered the ill-fated RMS Titanic on her maiden voyage at Cherbourg, France. The third being the Manchester Ship Canal's Daniel Adamson. In her career, Calshot has tendered some of the most famous ocean liners ever built, such as the RMS Caronia, the Cunard Queens RMS Queen Elizabeth and RMS Queen Mary, the SS United States, and the White Star Line ship RMS Olympic. During World War II she was requisitioned by the British Admiralty for servicing troop ships and took part in D-Day. She was a registered vessel of the National Historic Fleet of the United Kingdom, holding Certificate No. 1.

== Active service ==
Calshot was delivered in 1930 by John I Thornycroft & Co to the Red Funnel Line where she was put into service tendering the various liners that stopped either in the Solent or Southampton Water. Tendering saved the time and expense of docking a liner just to take up or set down a few passengers. She was also used to augment the excursion fleet. Calshot remained in service with Red Funnel from 1930-1964.

At the outbreak of World War II, Calshot was appropriated by the Admiralty for use at Scapa Flow. In 1942 she was transferred to the River Clyde where she acted as tender to the two Cunard Line Queens, RMS Queen Elizabeth and Queen Mary, transferring approximately 1,500,000 servicemen. In 1944 she returned to Southampton for the build up to D-Day. After the war she was returned to the Red Funnel Line.

Calshot featured prominently in the 1952 British Transport Films production "Ocean Terminal", in which, amongst other things, she was filmed easing RMS Queen Elizabeth away from her berth.

In 1964, Red Funnel sold the Calshot to a subsidiary of the Holland America Line who moved her to Galway Bay, Ireland. At this time her triple-expansion steam engine were replaced by a diesel engine and she was renamed Galway Bay after her new area of service. There, she was used as a tender for the liners Maasdam and Ryndam. She would later be operated by CIÉ as a ferry between Galway and the Aran Islands.

== Museum ship ==
In 1986, Calshot was bought back by her original port of registry (more specifically the Southampton City Council), with the intention of making her the centrepiece of a maritime museum in Ocean Village. In 1991, she was moved to an apparently permanent berth at Town Quay. However, she was later moved to the Council Wharf. On 5 April 2011, Calshot was moved by tugboat from Berth 50 to Berth 42.

While berthed in Southampton Calshot was maintained by the Tug Tender Calshot Trust. The intention was to display her as part of the Aeronautica Museum in Trafalgar Dock, Southampton which was anticipated to open in 2015. In 2012 the Associated British Ports (ABP) withdrew the Trafalgar Dock location for the museum citing the need to relocate Red Funnel Ferry operations. Without a long-term berth, the Trust was unable to develop a sustainable business plan as required for a Heritage Lottery Grant application.

In January 2017 the vessel was declared unseaworthy by the Maritime and Coastguard Agency. In October 2018 ABP informed the owners that the ship must vacate her berth by June 2019, but ABP later extended the deadline while negotiations continued. The owners requested a place to move the ship to dry land as the deteriorating condition of the ship will not allow it to remain in the water. ABP informed the owners that space was "not an option".

In 2019 the Trust made two proposals to move Calshot to dry land. One plan asked ABP and the Southampton city council tow the vessel to Mayflower Park and fill it in with dredging material, thus turning her into a land-locked exhibit. The proposal never had financial backing and the vessel was offered for sale at 1GBP. An "Intent to Deconstruct" notice was filed with the National Historic Fleet. The Trust then proposed converting the vessel to a land-based Titanic tribute ship at the Royal Pier.

In December 2020 Calshot's owners completely reorganized the board with new directors who would take a "fresh approach" to securing the vessel's future. However the ABP gave notice that they would begin to charge considerable berthing fees. The Trust would be unable to pay the fees and Calshot could be scrapped. In February 2021 the Trust began negotiations with a private company which had its own drydock and berth in Southampton.

On 27 February 2021 ownership was formally transferred from the Tug Tender Calshot Trust to a private company, Woodshack Limited. The company planned a three-year restoration program "...which will conform to modern operating standards, whilst maintaining her unique qualities." - Woodshack chairman Richard Hellyer. On 25 May Calshot was towed from the Southampton dock to a new berth on the River Itchen.

After over a year of inspection and evaluation the restoration project was halted, during which time, Woodshack Limited was taken over by The Calshot Group, the take over included the ownership of the now dry-docked T/T Calshot. It was found the extensive deterioration of the ship over many years required a complete rebuild of the hull. With the project costs escalating, the Calshot was dismantled by The Calshot Group during the summer of 2022.

== Bibliography ==
- Adams R B [1986] Red Funnel and Before, Kingfisher Publications, ISBN 0-946184-21-6
- Adams K [2011] Red Funnel 150, Celebrating 150 Years of the Southampton Isle of Wight Ferries, Richard Danielson, ISBN 978-0-9513155-5-2
