= Garlandstone =

Gaff-rigged ketch

Coordinates: 34.841633°S 138.508736°E

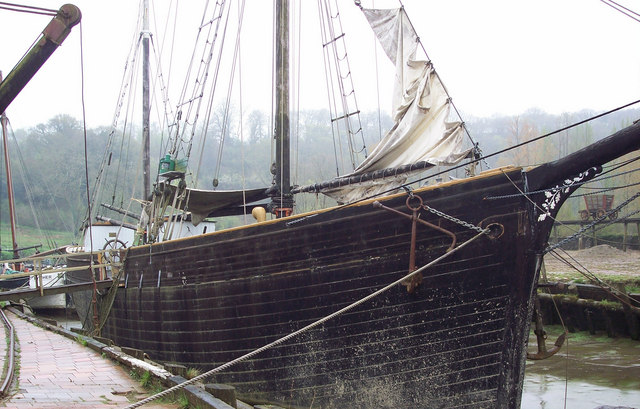
- The Garlandstone docked at Morwellham Quay in 2005.

History

United Kingdom
- Name: Garlandstone
- Builder: James Goss
- Laid down: 1903
- Launched: 27 January 1909
- Recommissioned: 2000
- Home port: (United Kingdom of Great Britain and Ireland) Calstock (1903); (United Kingdom of Great Britain and Ireland) Milford Haven (1909); (United Kingdom of Great Britain and Ireland) Porthmadog (1970's); Morwellham Quay (1987)
- Identification: Code letters MKXV; UK Official Number 128746
- Status: Abandoned

General characteristics
- Class & type: West Country Ketch
- Tonnage: 76 NRT
- Length: LOA 100 ft (30.48 m); LWL 76 ft (23.16 m)
- Beam: 20.2 ft (6.16 m)
- Depth: 8.98 ft (2.74 m)

The Garlandstone is a gaff-rigged sailing Tamar Ketch, built in Calstock in Cornwall, England, and launched on 27 January 1909. It was built by James Goss on speculation at the foot of Calstock Viaduct. She was designed for transporting goods between Great Britain and Ireland.

== Commercial activity ==
She was designed for transporting goods between Great Britain and Ireland, via the Celtic Sea and rivers of the South West England, in particular the River Tamar and the River Severn. She also regularly sailed between Lisbon and Calstock, notably supplying fresh fruit to the townspeople.

During the Great War she took an active part ferrying munitions across the Irish Sea.

== Redundancy ==
In 1961 the vessel fell out of use and was donated to the National Maritime Museum in Wales. She remained along the quayside wall at Porthmadog, in North Wales until she was finally towed back to the river of her origin, the River Tamar.

== Restoration ==
Restoration work began in 1990 funded by the National Heritage Lottery. In 1996 the ship was registered as a ship of the National Historic Fleet. The restoration was completed at Morwellham Quay in 2000 and she was recommissioned. Since then the ship has been used as a static museum at Morwellham and due to lack of use has fallen into a state of disrepair. In late 2010, there was a public appeal for the restoration of the ship, but no restoration took place.

== Gallery ==
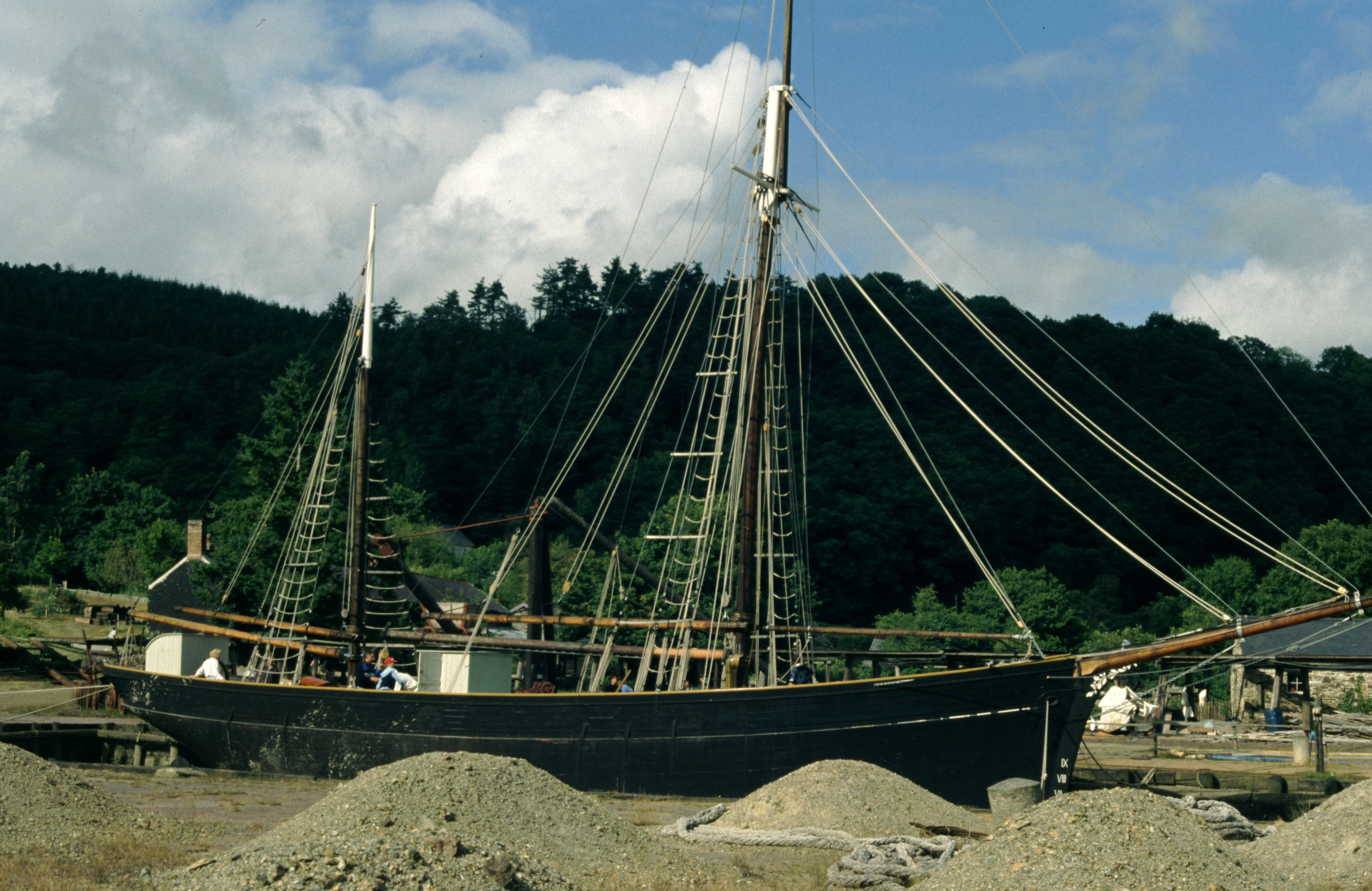
The Garlandstone at Morwellham Quay, Devon

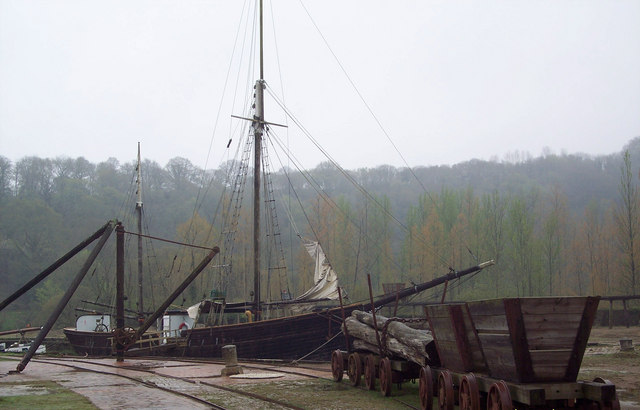
The Garlandstone at Morwellham Quay, Devon

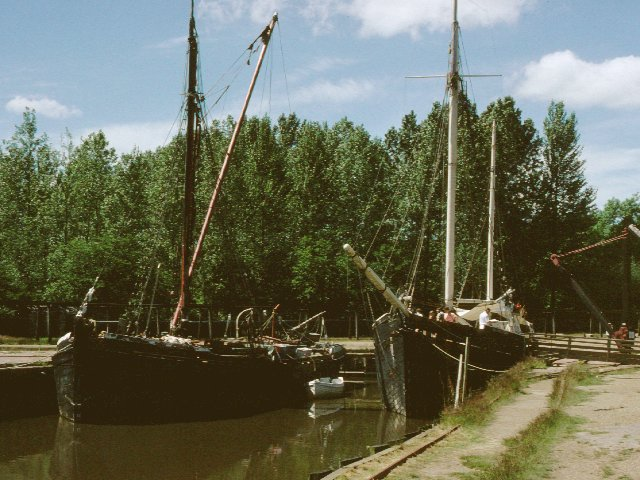
The Garlandstone at Morwellham Quay, Devon alongside the Thames barge The Beatrice Maud

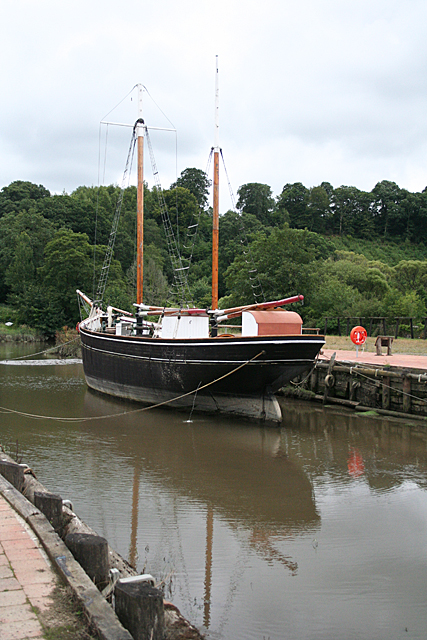
The Garlandstone berthed in Morwellham Quay's Great Dock

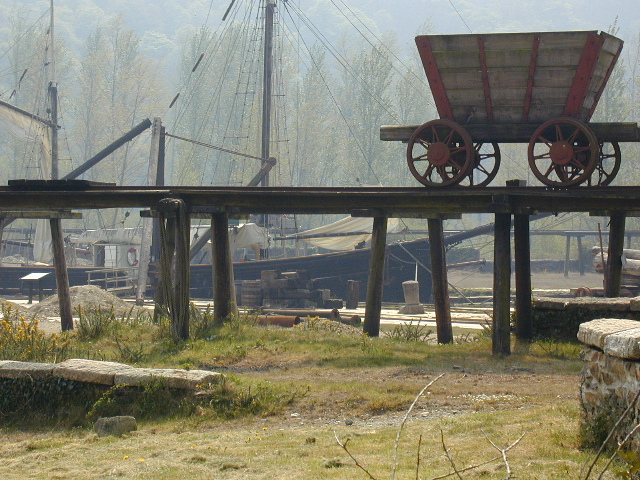
The Garlandstone moored at Morwellham Quay, hidden behind the old mine trains

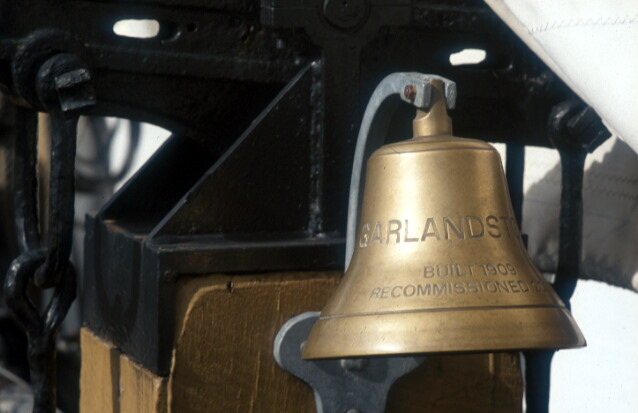
The Garlandstone's ships bell after the recommissioning in 2000

== See also ==
- West Country Ketch – Two-masted sailing ship
- Calstock
- Morwellham Quay – Historic river port in Devon, England
