= RNLB Jesse Lumb =

Historic English lifeboat

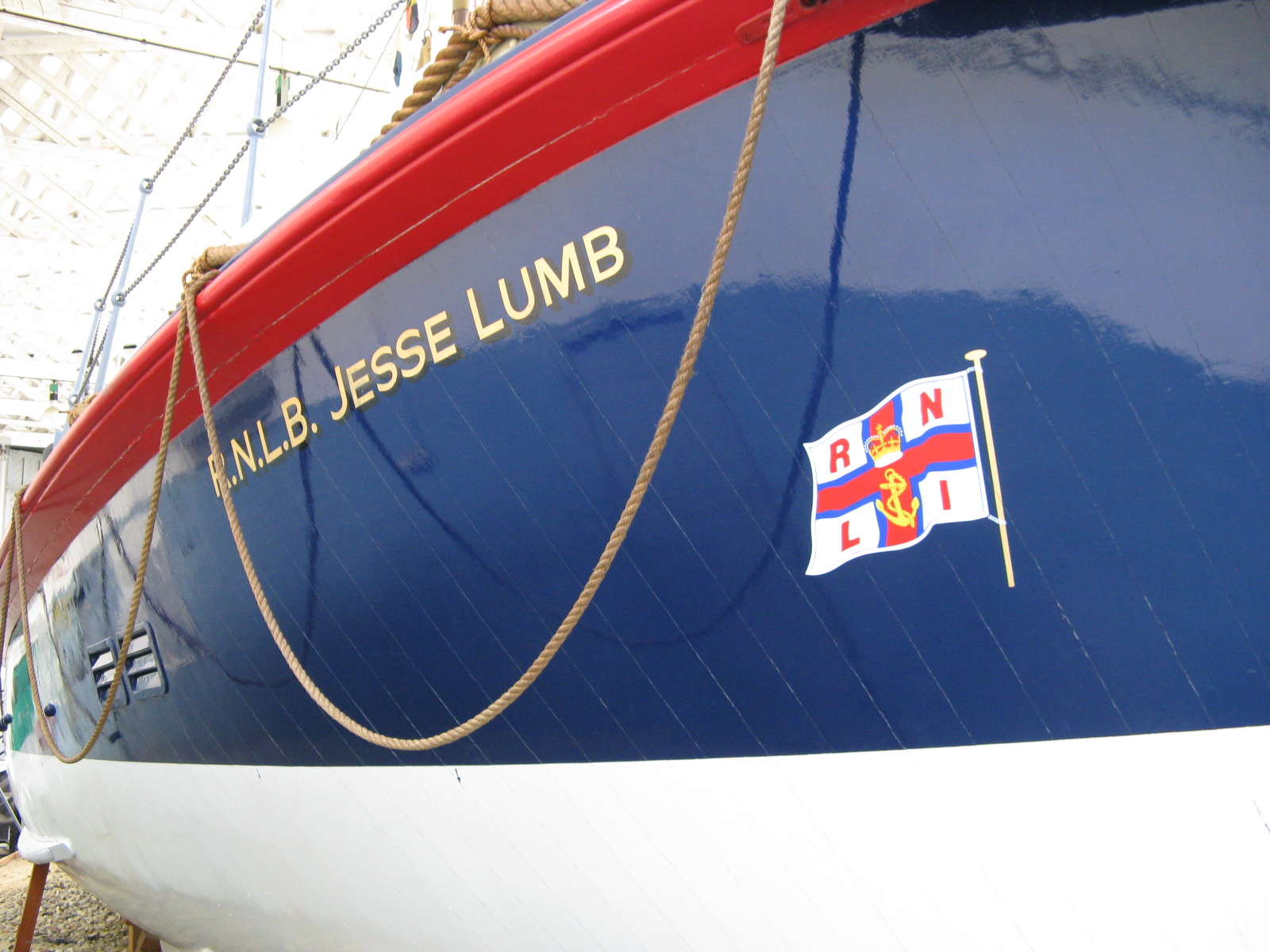
- A view of the hull of the Jesse Lumb, currently located at Classic Boat Museum, Cowes

History

United Kingdom
- Operator: Royal National Lifeboat Institution
- Builder: J. Samuel White
- Cost: £9,000
- Sponsored by: Annie Lumb
- Christened: 21 July 1939
- In service: 1939-1970
- Home port: Bembridge, Isle of Wight, United Kingdom
- Status: Museum ship at IWM Duxford
- Official Number: ON 822

General characteristics
- Class & type: Watson-class lifeboat
- Displacement: 20.5 tons
- Length: 46 ft (14 m)
- Beam: 13 ft (4.0 m)
- Height: 22 ft (6.7 m)
- Propulsion: Twin diesel engines
- Speed: 8.5 knots (15.7 km/h)

RNLB Jesse Lumb (ON 822) is a historic lifeboat. Built by J. Samuel White in 1939, Jesse Lumb served as the lifeboat at Bembridge on the Isle of Wight from 1939 to 1970, becoming the last of her type in service. Since 2000 she has been preserved at Classic Boat Museum, Cowes. In August 1999 she was inscribed on the National Register of Historic Vessels, becoming part of the National Historic Fleet.

== Design and construction ==
Jesse Lumb is a 46-ft Watson-class lifeboat constructed from mahogany with a diagonally planked double skin. She was powered by two diesel engines with twin propellers, and displaced 20.5 tons. (Note: The National Register states Jesse Lumb was powered by twin Ferry VE4 40hp engines, while the Imperial War Museum catalogue states she was powered by two Parsons Barracuda 65hp engines.) Jesse Lumb was named in honour of the owner of Folly Hall Mill in Huddersfield, and her construction funded by a £9,000 bequest by Annie Lumb, Jesse Lumb's sister. The lifeboat was named on 21 July 1939.

== Operational service ==
Commissioned in summer 1939 Jesse Lumb served throughout the Second World War, saving 138 lives during the conflict. (Note: The Imperial War Museum catalogue states that 'nearly 300' lives were saved during the boat's entire career, while the Folly Hall Mill website states that 224 lives were saved from 294 launches) On the night of 29/30 January 1940, Jesse Lumb spent 14 hours at sea in freezing weather while rescuing the crew of the trawler Kingston Cairngorm off Chichester. Coxswain Harry J Gawn was later awarded the Royal National Lifeboat Institution Bronze Medal. On 8 August 1940, during the Battle of Britain, Jesse Lumb went to the assistance of a Royal Air Force air-sea rescue launch that had been machine-gunned by German aircraft.

After the Second World War, Jesse Lumb participated in other notable rescues; on 5 December 1947 she rescued 18 crewmen from the trawler Erraid, and in 1968 assisted the diesel-electric submarine HMS Alliance after its stranding on Bembridge Ledge.

== Preservation ==
Jesse Lumb's service at Bembridge ended in 1970. She then spent some years in the RNLI relief fleet before being acquired by the Imperial War Museum and placed on display at the museum's branch at Duxford in Cambridgeshire. She became part of the National Historic Fleet in August 1999, with certificate number 1759.

== Notes ==
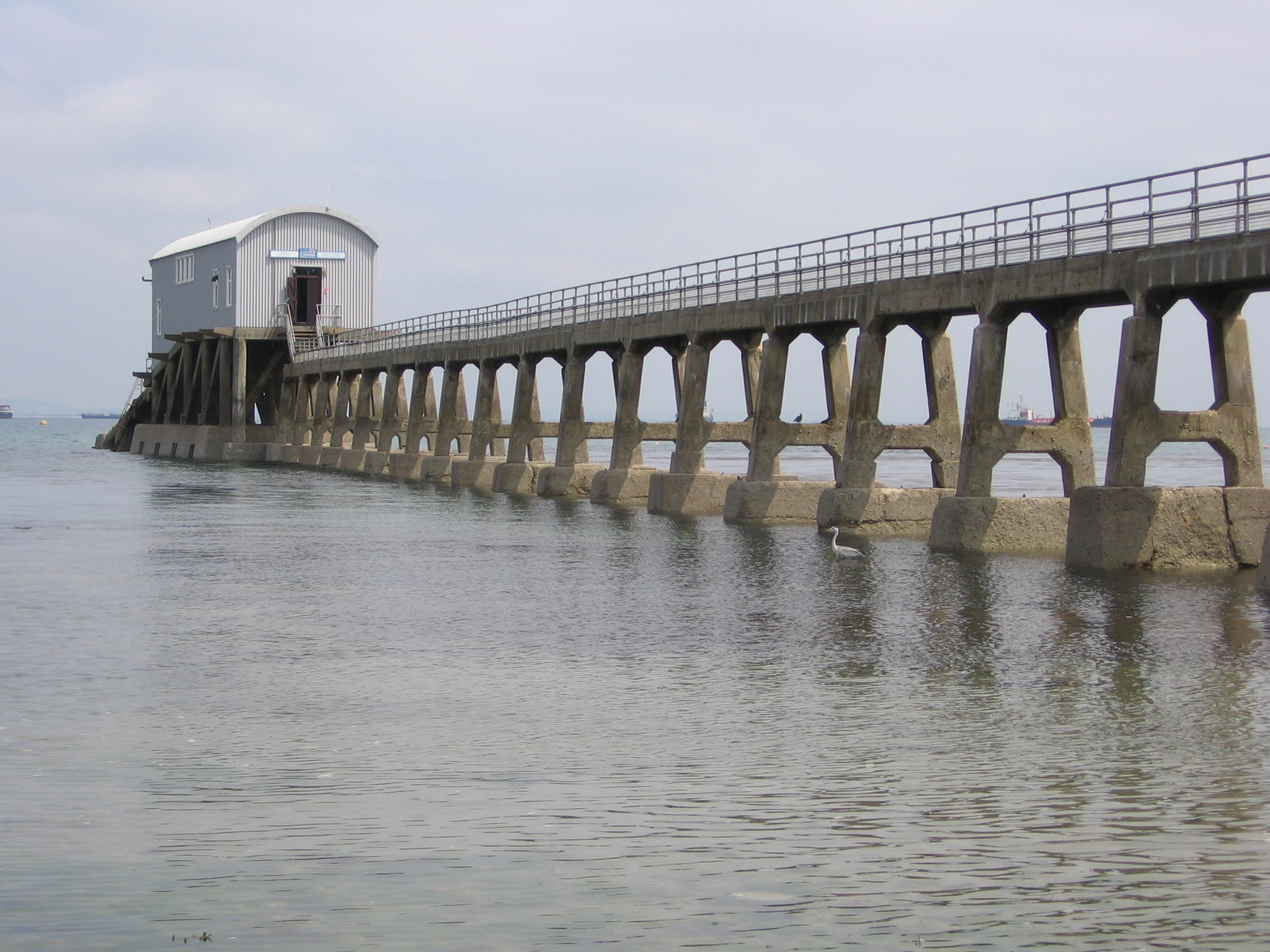
The Bembridge Lifeboat Station in 2007, since demolished and replaced by a new structure on the same site
