= Sails of Dawn =

Racing yacht

Sails Of Dawn is a bermuda yawl-rigged ocean racing and cruising yacht, one of the last boats that the designer, John Laurent Giles, saw launched before his death in 1969. The wooden-hulled yacht was built, to both Lloyd's Register and Royal Ocean Racing Club certification, by McGruer & Co Ltd in their yard at Clynder on Gare Loch, Argyll and Bute, Scotland as Yard No.625. The price was £UK 48,000 plus 8% design fees to Laurent Giles.

The yacht had a length of 57.0 feet (17.4 m) feet overall and 40.0 feet (12.2 m) at the waterline, a beam of 13.5 feet (4.1 m) and depth of hull 7.0 feet (2.1 m), and measured 26 GRT. On completion in 1969, Sails of Dawn was registered at Greenock, with British Official Number 334314.

The yacht was built for David Morell, then chairman of Mitchell Construction, Peterborough, UK. Following his retirement from his chartered surveyor career in 1975, he made a year-long cruise with Sails of Dawn to New Zealand. After Morell's death in 2007, Sails of Dawn remained out of use, until sold in 2015 to David Kirkby and restoration was begun. Resold in July 2019, restoration is continuing on Manoel Island, Malta.
