= Brixham trawler =

Type of wooden deep-sea fishing trawler

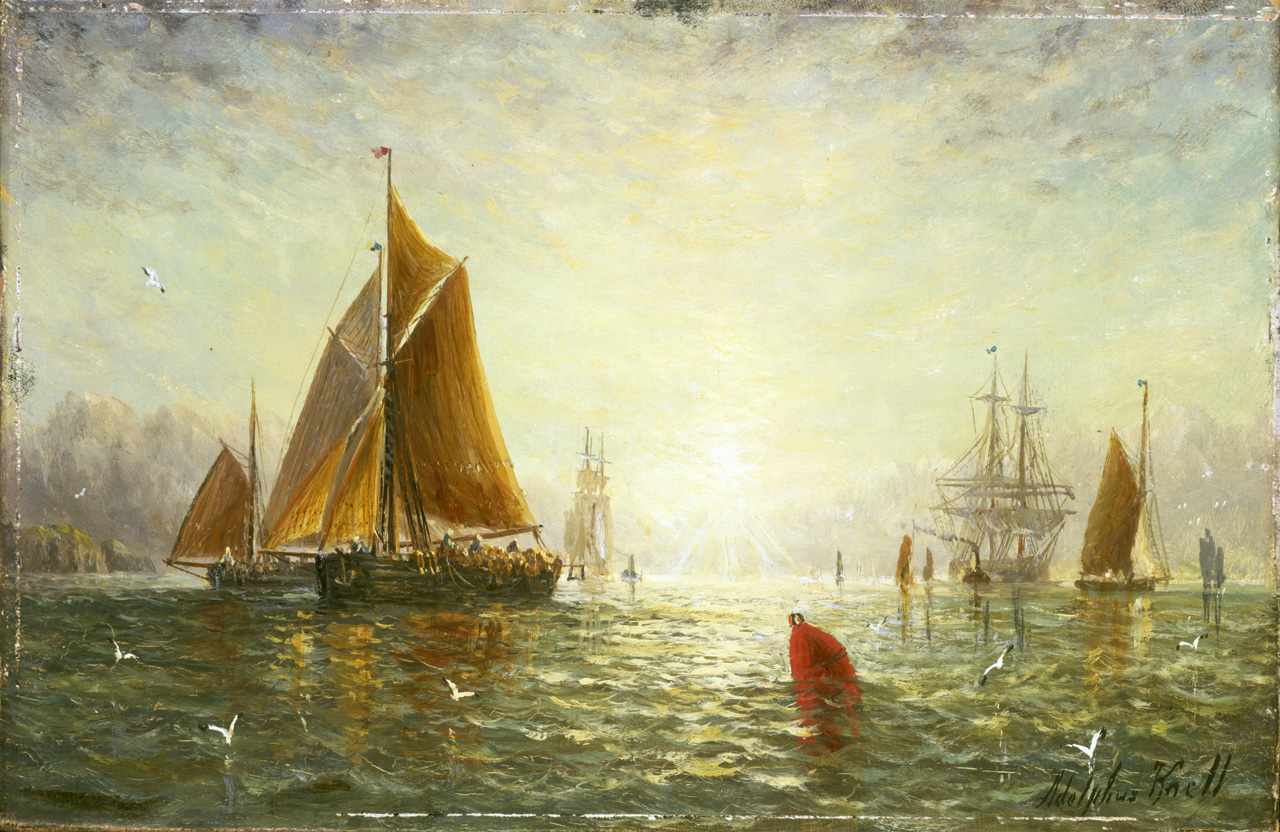
Painting of A Brixham trawler by William Adolphus Knell. The painting is now in the National Maritime Museum.

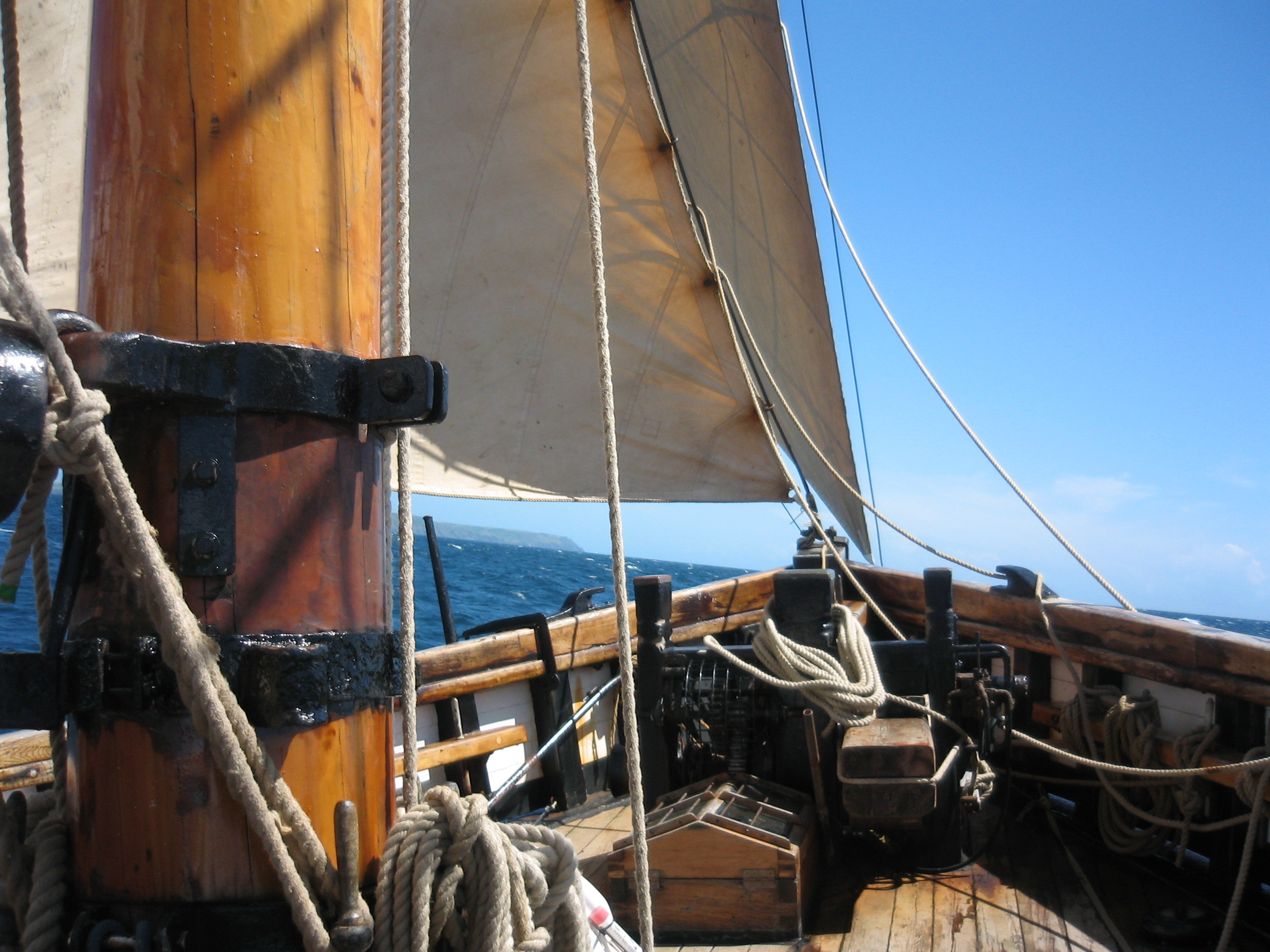
Looking forward on the deck of the Brixham trawler Leader, under way under sail off the south coast of England. July 2008.

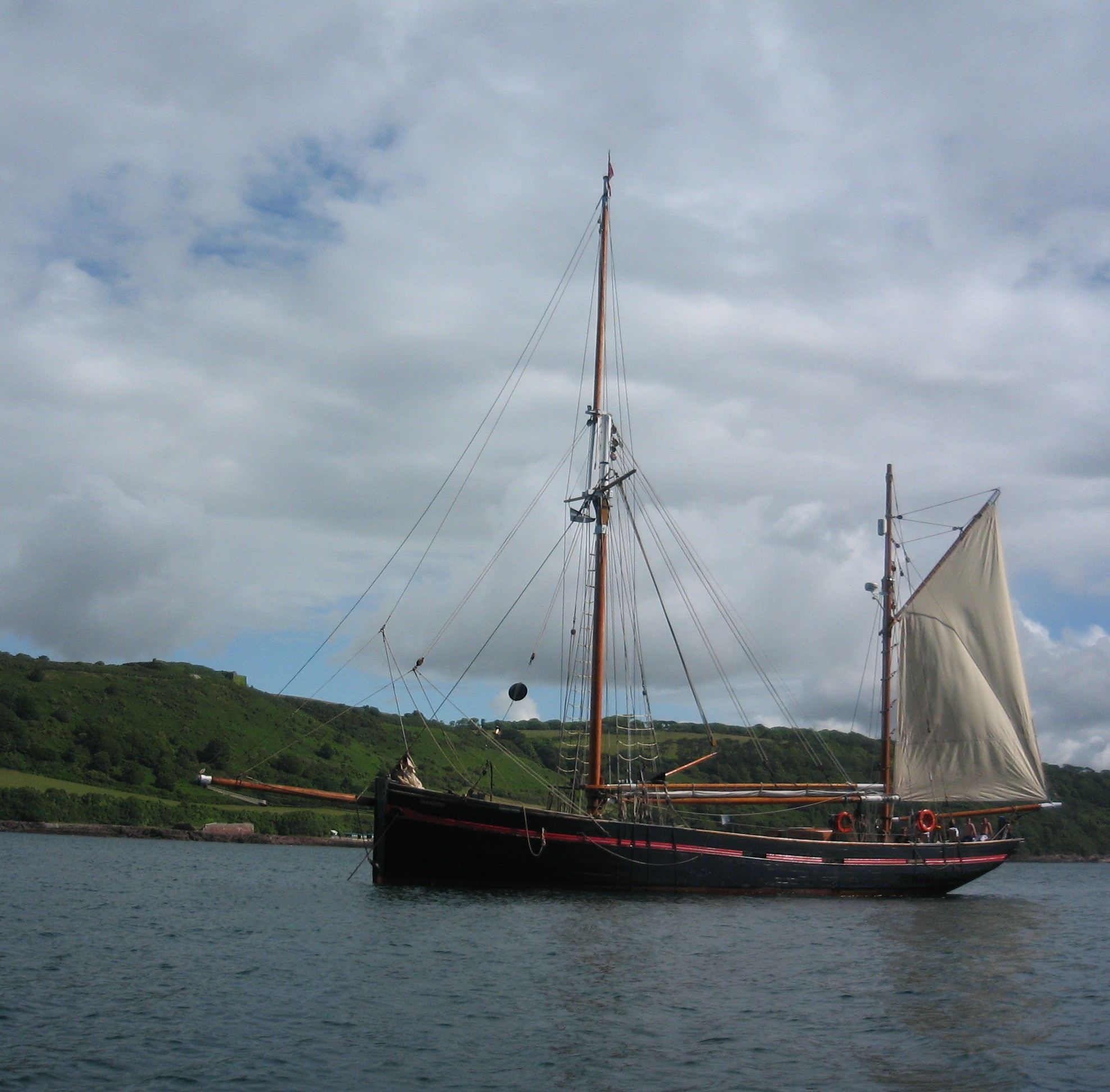
The Brixham trawler Leader at anchor off Cawsand, near Plymouth. July 2008.

A Brixham trawler is a type of wooden, deep-sea fishing trawler first built in Brixham in Devon, England, in the 19th century and known for its high speed. The design was copied by boat builders around Britain, and some were sold to fishermen in other countries bordering the North Sea.

The Brixham trawler was a heavy displacement boat of some 60–80 ft length on the deck, with a long straight keel, a straight vertical stem, usually a fantail stern, and a low freeboard to ease the handling of the nets, though this feature was disguised by high bulwarks. Brixham trawlers carried a tall gaff rig, often ketch rigged though also simply a large sloop, that was powerful enough to carry them quickly to and from the fishing grounds and to tow large trawls. Renowned yacht aerodynamicist and sailor C. A. Marchaj commented on the type, "With little area of keel surface, these boats lacked weatherliness as compared with the Quay Punt… Not without reason, fishermen of the north-east coast swore that the forefoot took them to windward."

Brixham once had a fleet of 400 such vessels, whose distinctive red sails were coated with local red ochre for protection. Other fleets were at Lowestoft with 375 trawlers, 450 at Hull, 625 at Great Yarmouth and 840 at Grimsby, with smaller numbers at other places. Only five remain afloat. One of them, Provident (BM28), took part in the Thames Diamond Jubilee Pageant. In 2020 only two existing Brixham Trawlers are based in Brixham. Both built by J W & A Uphams. Pilgrim (1895) and Vigilance (1928). in 2022, Vigilance received a grant of £2,000 towards her renovation from the Royal Warrant Holders Association charity fund as part of the Queen's Platinum Jublilee awards.

== In popular culture ==
In the 1968 Kingsley Amis novel Colonel Sun, James Bond says he once spent several months serving aboard a Brixham trawler, suggesting Operation Postmaster.

== Rescue ==
On 1 January 1915, the crew of Provident BM291 rescued 71 sailors from HMS Formidable, torpedoed and sunk by a German U-boat in the English Channel during the night in a gale.
