= Dolly (steam launch) =

Oldest mechanically powered vessel in the world

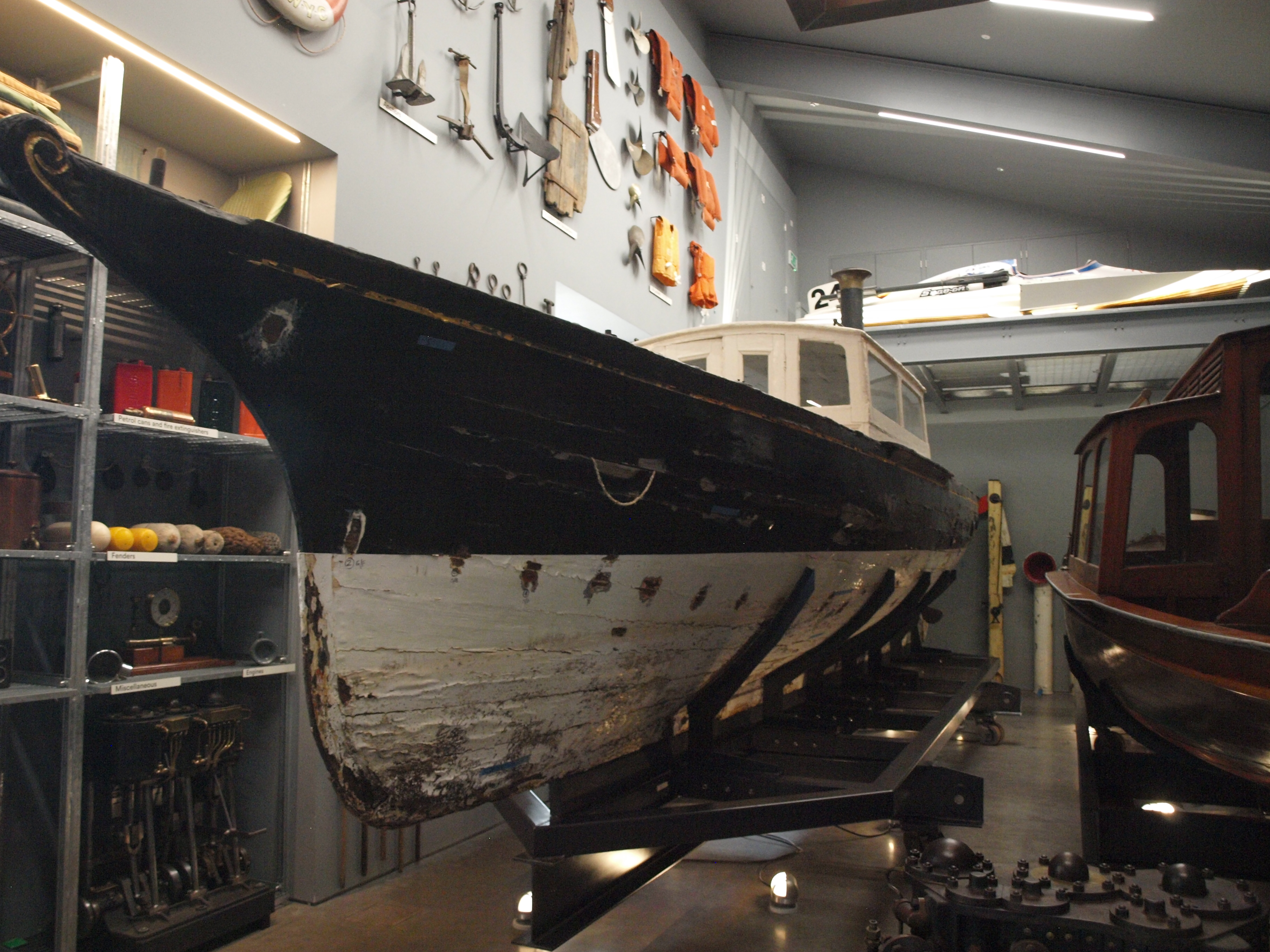
- Dolly in Windermere Jetty Museum

History

United Kingdom
- Name: Dolly
- Owner: Alfred Fildes (c. 1850); Windermere Jetty Museum (current)
- Builder: Unknown
- Launched: 1850
- Acquired: 1962 (by George Pattinson)
- In service: 1850–1895; 1965–1980s
- Out of service: 1895 (sunk); 2019 (static exhibit)
- Identification: National Historic Ships Certificate no. 660
- Fate: Sunk in Ullswater, Feb 1895; salvaged Nov 1962. Currently a static museum exhibit.

General characteristics
- Type: Steam launch
- Length: 41 ft (12.5 m)
- Beam: 6 ft 6 in (2.0 m)
- Draught: 4.0 ft (1.2 m)
- Depth: 4.0 ft (1.22 m)
- Decks: 1
- Installed power: 1 × Inverted vertical single-cylinder steam engine; 7 in × 7 in (178 mm × 178 mm) bore and stroke; 1 × Scotch return tube boiler by Ocean Fleets Ltd, Birkenhead (1975)
- Propulsion: 1 × screw propeller
- Speed: 5 mph (8 km/h)

SL Dolly is a steam launch currently located in Windermere Jetty: Museum of Boats, Steam and Stories. Built in 1850, she is the oldest mechanically powered vessel in the world. After sinking in Ullswater in 1895 she lay on the lakebed for 65 years before being salvaged and restored. She is now a museum exhibit and a member of the National Historic Fleet.

== History ==
=== Early service and sinking (1850–1895) ===
Though her builder is unknown Dolly is believed to have been built for, and owned by, Alfred Fildes of Sawrey. She was the first screw-propelled steam vessel in the world; earlier railway-owned vessels were paddle steamers.

In 1894, a Mr Bowness purchased the launch and moved her to Ullswater, where she was transported over the Kirkstone Pass by a team of horses or a traction engine. During the Great Frost of February 1895 the vessel was trapped in ice at her moorings; the pressure damaged the hull, causing her to sink in 45 feet of water.

=== Discovery and salvage (1960–1972) ===
The wreck was discovered by accident in early 1960 by divers from the Furness Sub-Aqua Club. In November 1962 a salvage operation led by Gerry Jackson successfully raised the launch and towed her to Glenridding Pier.

The vessel was acquired by George Pattinson who oversaw a three-year restoration at the Windermere Steamboat Museum. She returned to steam on 22 August 1965. During the early years of her restoration, she was known only as the Ullswater Steamer; she was not conclusively identified as SL Dolly until 1972 when an original photograph of the vessel was discovered.

In 1966 Prince Philip, Duke of Edinburgh visited Windermere and was taken for a trip aboard Dolly.

Dolly is recognized by the Guinness Book of Records as the oldest mechanically powered boat in the world. Since 2019 she has been a static exhibit at the Windermere Jetty Museum, where she is housed in a climate-controlled dry dock to preserve her original timber.

== See also ==
- National Historic Fleet
- Mayflower
- HMS Victory
