= West Country ketch =

Two-masted sailing ship

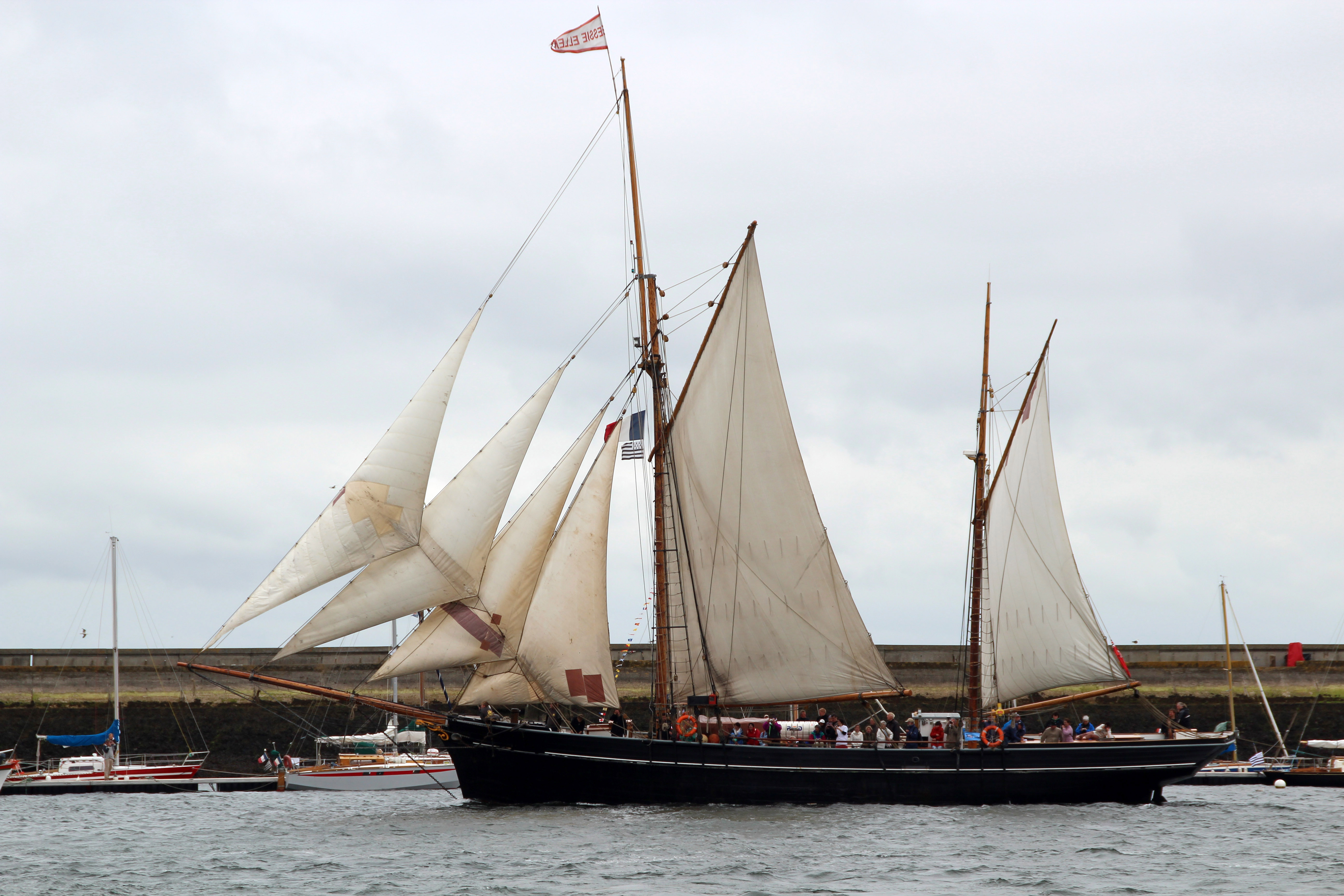
The Bessie Ellen at Brest, France

A West Country ketch or a Tamar ketch is a two-masted sailing ketch, designed for carrying cargo from the South West England, predominantly from the ports of the River Tamar, to ports on the Celtic Sea, such as Cork.

The West Country ketch is a specialist type of ketch designed for the waters of the Celtic Sea. At the peak of nautical trading within this region there were up to 700 West Country trading ketches active, only three such vessels have survived to the modern day. This type of vessel is characterised by having a length between 100 ft - 120 ft, a depth of 10 ft and a beam of 20 ft. This type of vessel has a wide midship section, with a sharp bow and a rounded stern. These vessels can carry 75 - 100 tons in their holds. Its shape was very well suited to trading in the Celtic Sea.

The Tamar ketch is relatively shorter than the West Country ketch. It is not only suited to trading in the Celtic Sea, but also travelling up rivers. They were usually built on the banks of the River Tamar. The only current Tamar ketch is the Garlandstone, built by James Goss, in Calstock.

== Surviving West Country ketches ==
Vessel	Length	Beam	Tonnage	Builder	Date	Place	Ref
Bessie Ellen	115 ft	20 ft	87	William S Kelly	1904	Mount Batten, Devon	
Garlandstone	100 ft	20 ft	76	James Goss	1909	Calstock, Devon	
Irene	118 ft	21 ft	98	J F Carver & Sons	1907	Bridgwater, Somerset	

== Gallery ==
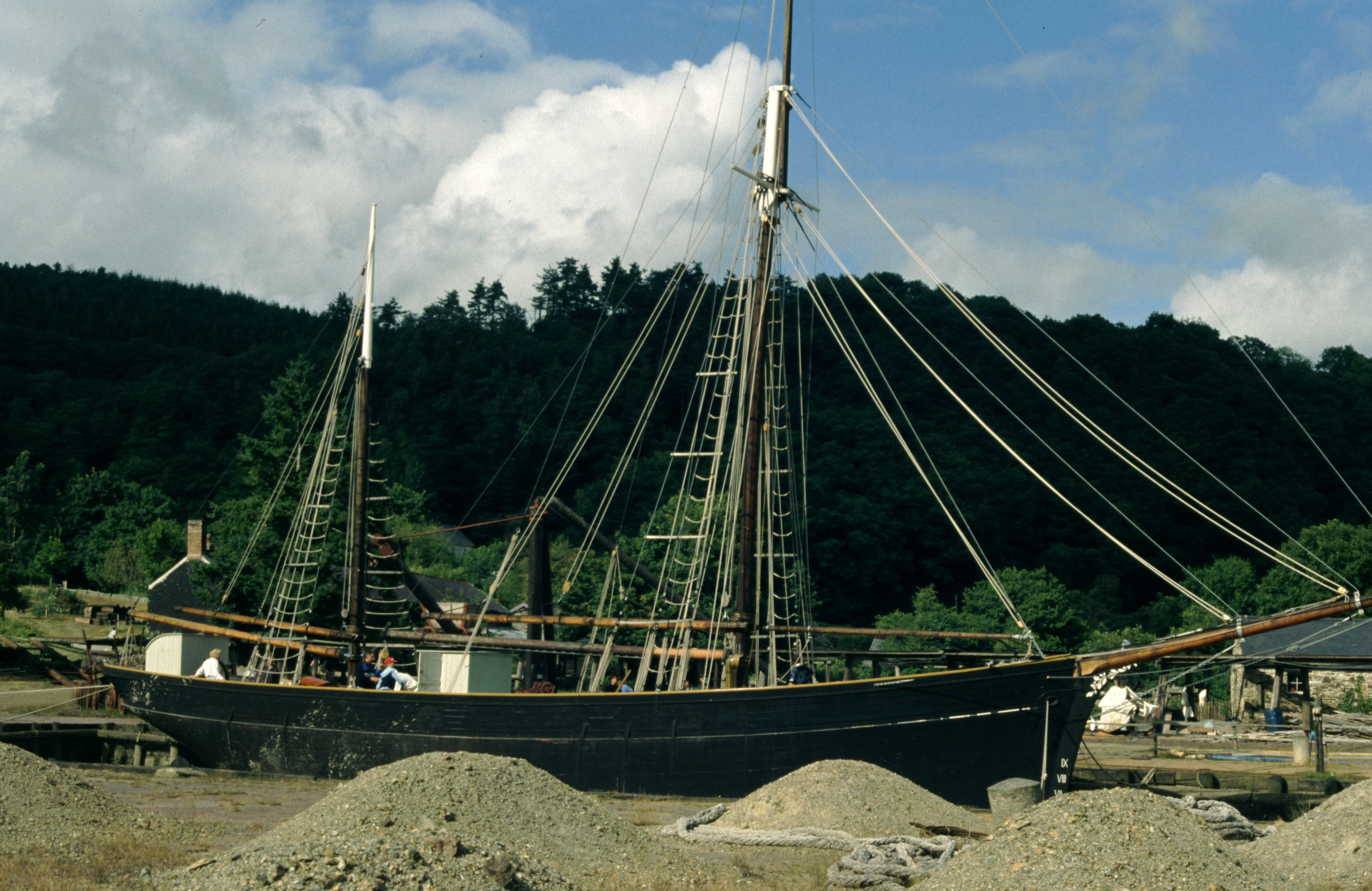
Garlandstone at Morwellham Quay, Devon

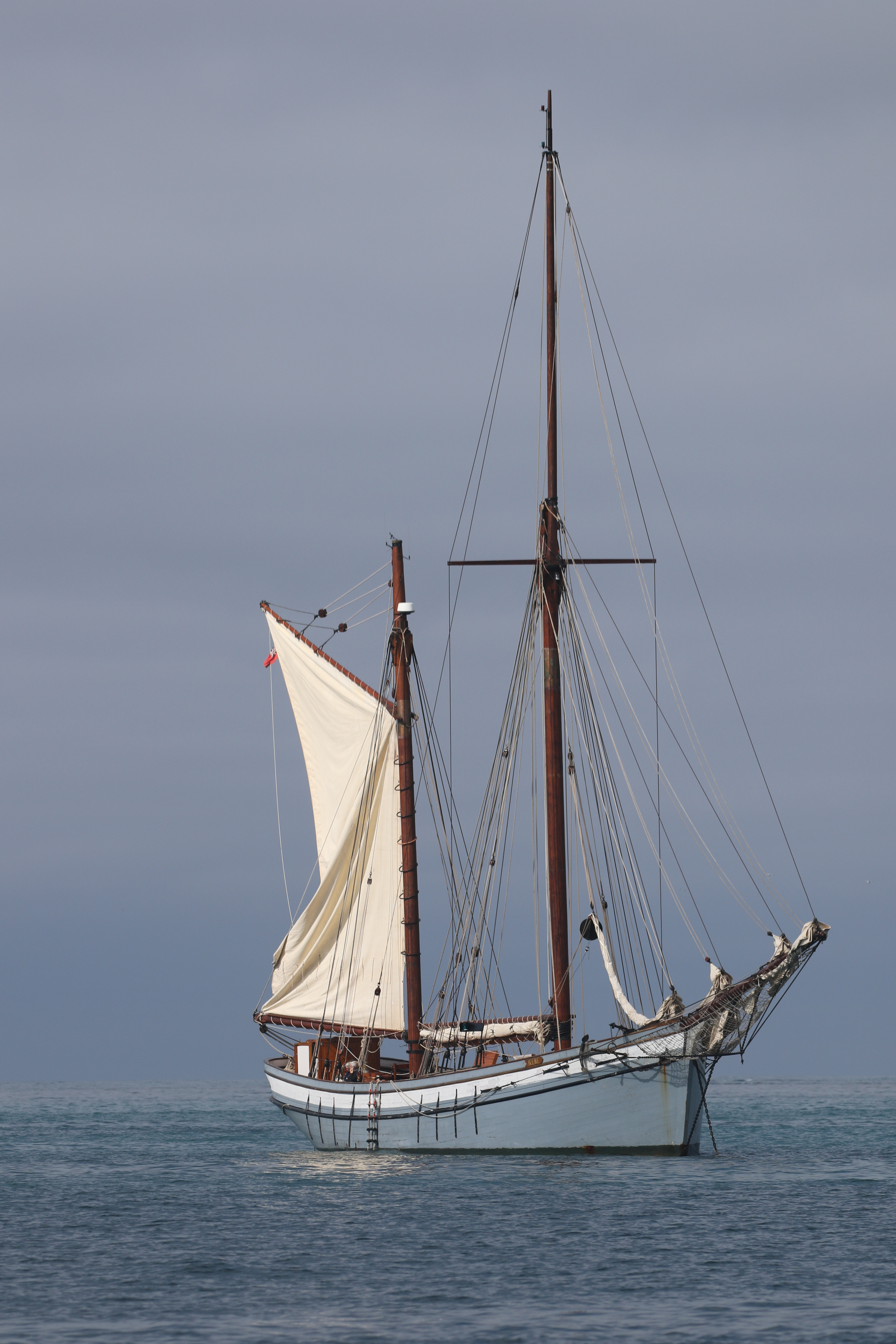
Irene off of the coast of the Isles of Scilly

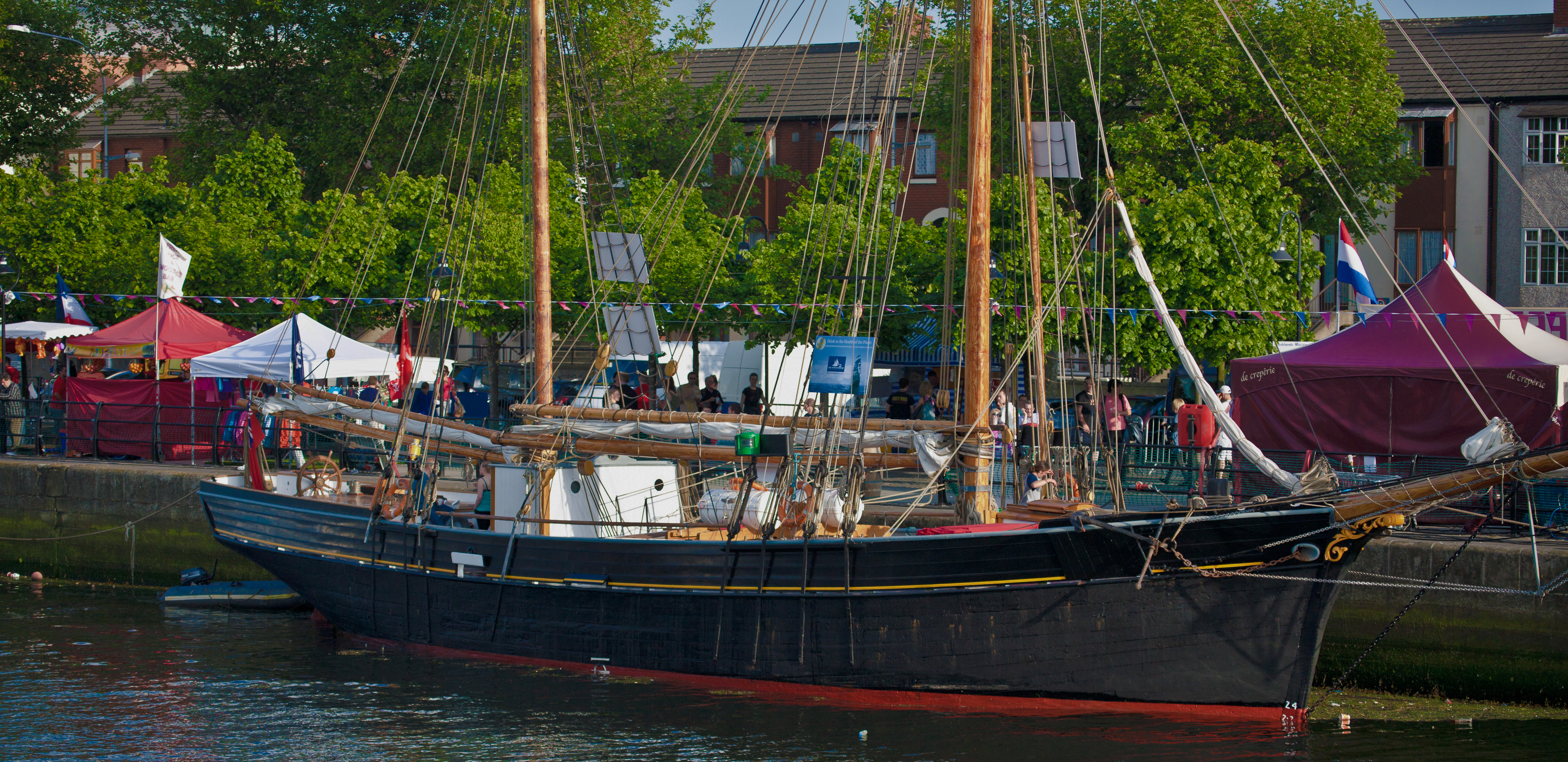
Bessie Ellen in Dublin, Ireland

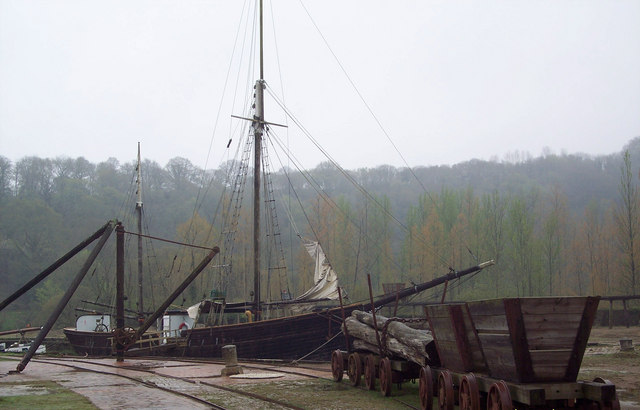
Garlandstone at Morwellham Quay, Devon

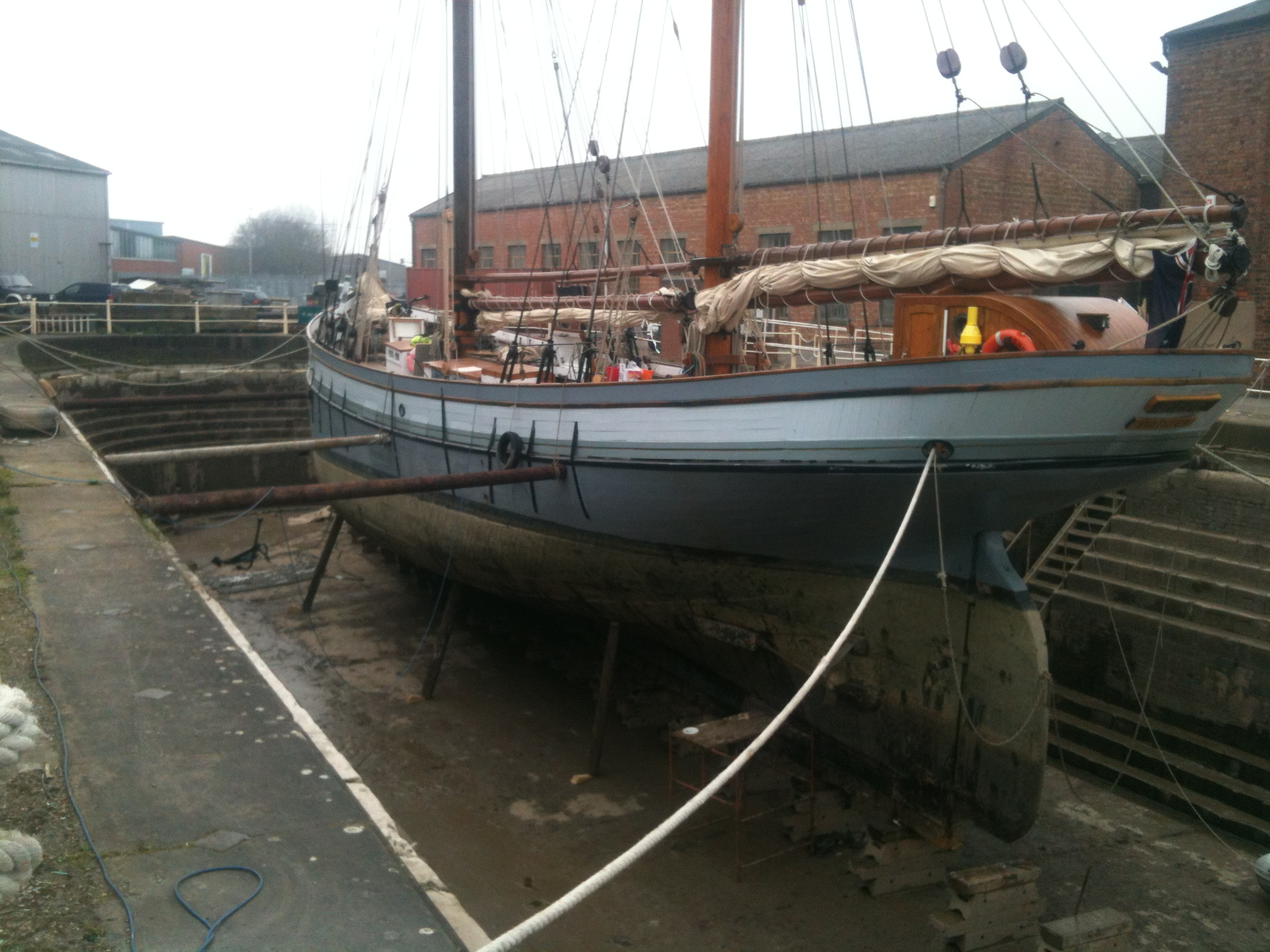
Irene in dry dock in Gloucester

== See also ==
- Tamar Barge
