= MV Regal Lady =

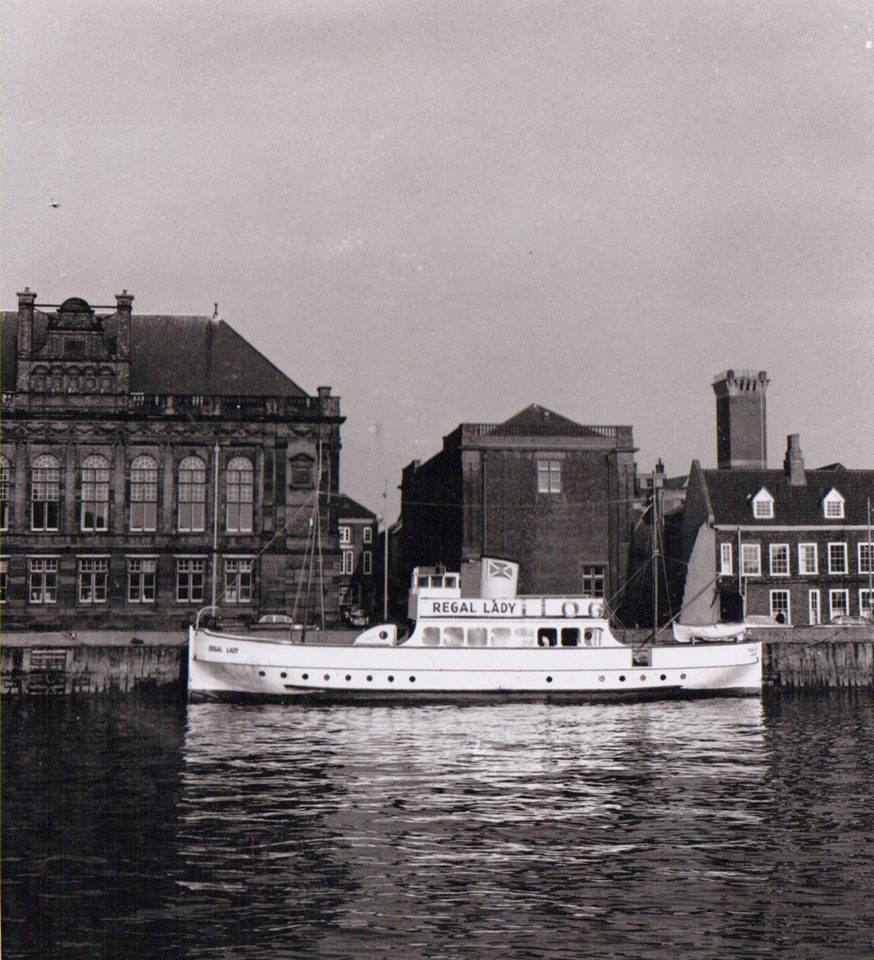
- MV Regal Lady at Great Yarmouth Town Hall Quay

History

United Kingdom
- Name: Regal Lady (Oulton Belle until 1954)
- Owner: Heath Samples
- Builder: Fellows & Co, Great Yarmouth
- Launched: 23 May 1930
- Out of service: 2020
- Status: Museum

General characteristics
- Class & type: V
- Tonnage: 72 GRT
- Length: 84tt
- Beam: 16ft 6inches
- Height: (Not including mast tips) 25ft
- Draught: 6ft 6inches (fresh water)
- Depth: 2.01
- Decks: 3
- Installed power: (1954 to 1984 Norwich Verified 160 HP Glenniffer DC8 Clutch cone reversing gear box and 3/1 reduction box
- Propulsion: Motor
- Speed: 9 Knots
- Capacity: (Oulton Belle 300) (Regal Lady Norwich 1971 to 1984 222)
- Crew: (Norwich 1971 to 1984) - Total 5

The MV Regal Lady is a 1930 built steel passenger boat moored at the port of Scarborough, North Yorkshire, England. She is a National Historic Ship, owned and preserved by Scarborough Pleasure Steamers. The ship participated in Operation Dynamo at Dunkirk, was decommissioned in 1946, and in 1954 was moved to Scarborough and renamed from Oulton Belle to its current name.

== Mechanics ==
Powered by a Gardner Marine 8L3B long stroke reciprocal diesel engine, has a cruising speed of nine knots. One of very few vessels to use a twin rudder system, she steered from her bow whilst going astern using a fore rudder, and conventionally steers from a large stern rudder when steaming ahead. Her steering gear is operated by chains and spliced wire driving the two large cast iron quadrants from her opposing geared ships wheel, an original feature of the vessel.

In 1948 her bow propeller was removed, the old funnel replaced and an upper deck added. In 1954 her steam engine, made by Elliot & Garood of Beccles, was cut up for ballast and replaced by a 160 hp (120 kW), 8 cylinder Glenniffer diesel engine, giving her a cruising speed of 10 kn (19 km/h; 12 mph).

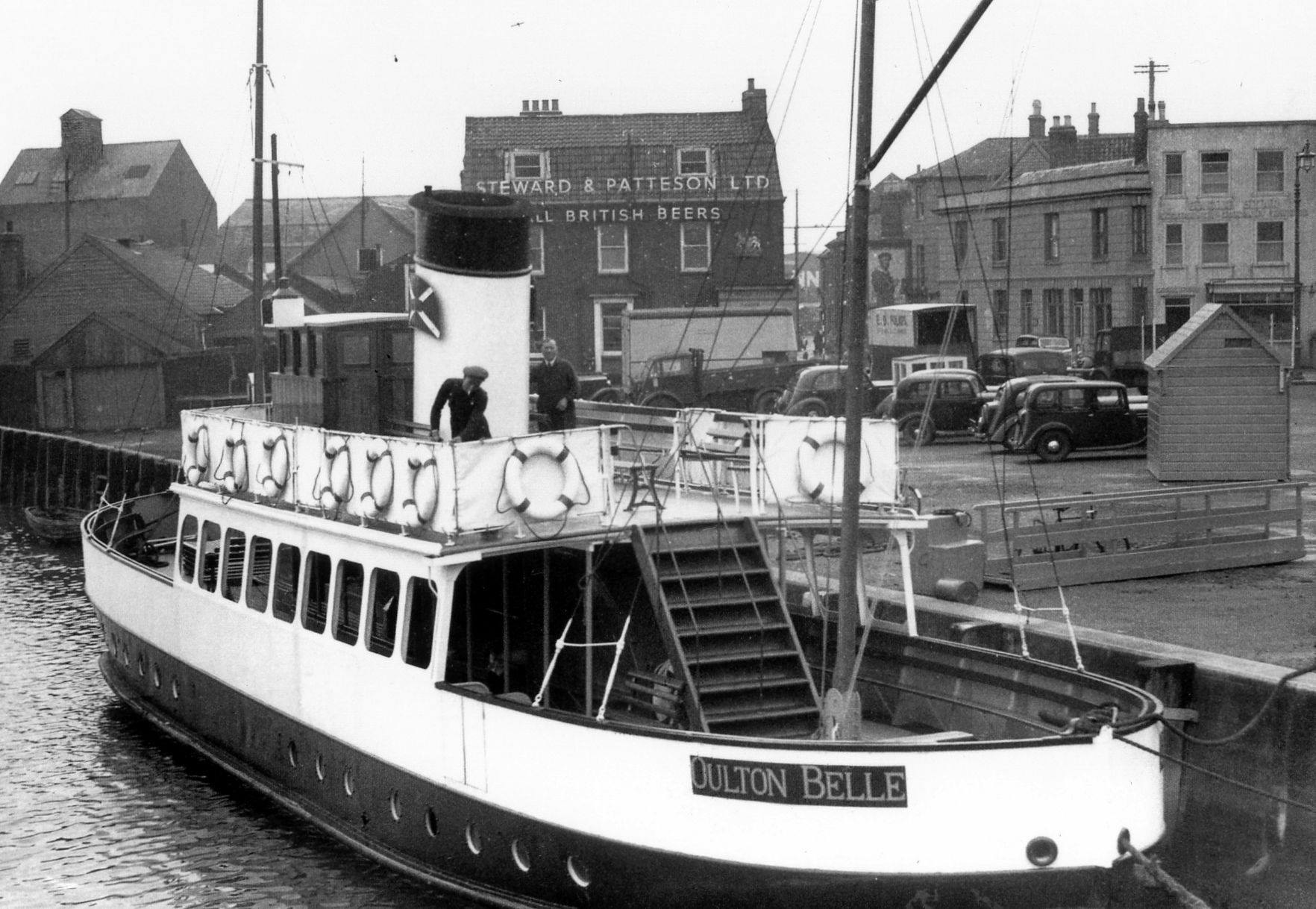
Pleasure Steamer

== History ==
Launched on 23 May 1930 at Fellows and Co, Great Yarmouth by Lady Fellow. She was built to a proven design, unique to the Oulton Broad, featuring a canoe hull, and known as a 'double-ender', complementing her identical bows and stern. Underneath the waterline, Regal Lady was originally propelled by two four bladed cast iron props, one fore and one aft, the main reason being that she was too large to turn round on the Norfolk waterways. Powered by a steam engine with direct drive to either shaft.

=== Naval service ===
In 1940 Regal Lady and her crew were requisitioned by the Admiralty, and participated in Operation Dynamo. It is known that in three crossings, she carried 1200 troops over the channel, back to Ramsgate. After the epic of Dunkirk, Regal Lady relocated to the River Clyde in Scotland, where she continued to serve in the war as a tender to the great liners, Queen Mary and Queen Elizabeth, transporting American Troops. In 1945, she was released back to her original owners based in Great Yarmouth.

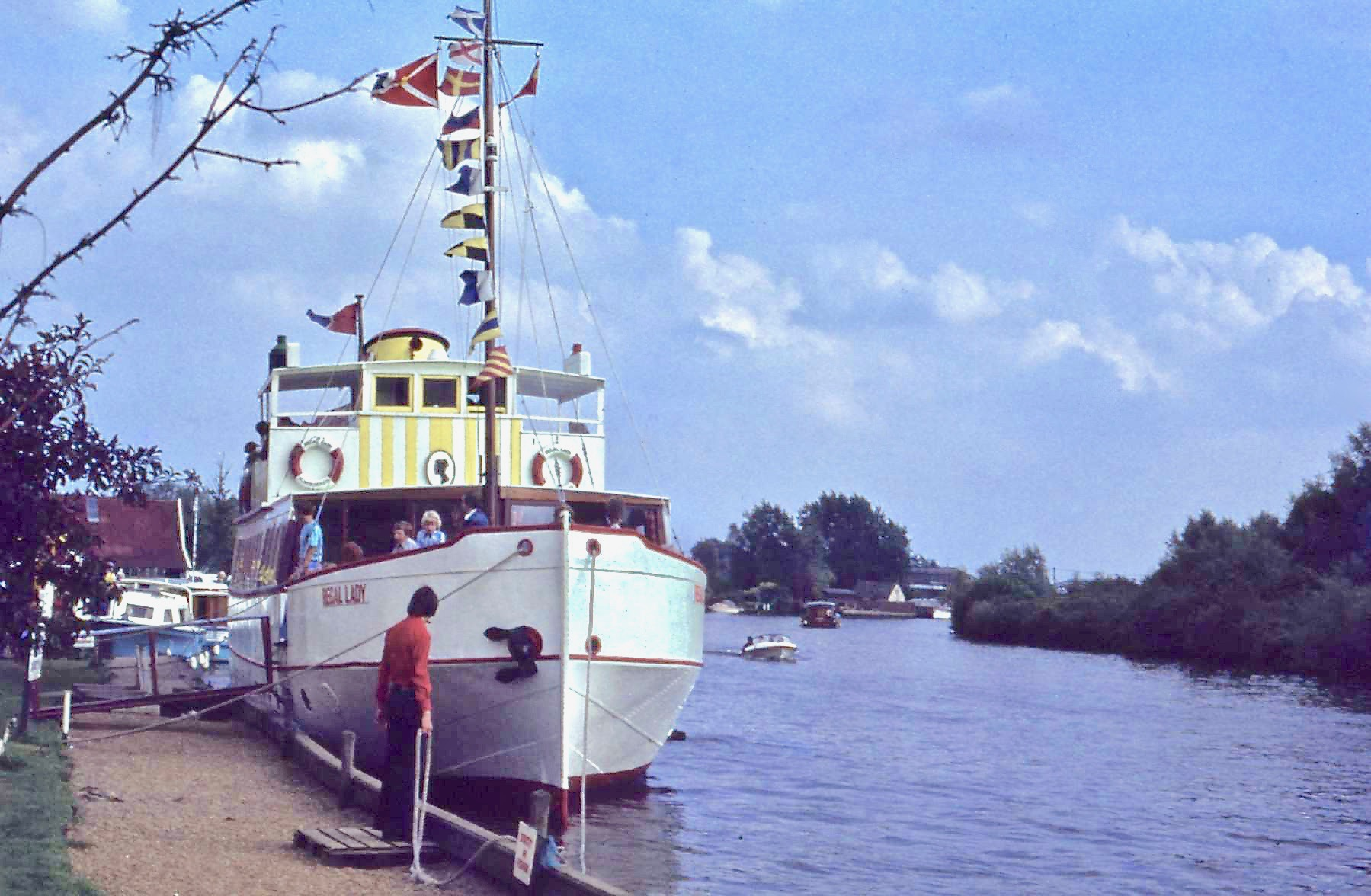
Regal Lady at half way stop (Brundall Norfolk prior to returning to her main berth @ Norwich Thorpe in 1978

=== Passenger service ===
The name Regal Lady came about in 1954 when she initially moved to Scarborough. A tradition dating back to the early 20th Century, she is the sixth and last vessel in Scarborough to bear the name 'Lady'.

In 1962 the Lady was fitted with radar, and passengers allowed to look through it for a shilling.

She returned to Norwich in 1970 and operated cruises from near Foundry Bridge until 1984. Tom Machin (North Sea Leisure) brought her back to Scarborough on 8 January 1987. Her wheelhouse was replaced in glass fibre and her steel superstructure extended, ready for her first public trip on 24 May 1987. In February 2020 she was converted into a Dunkirk museum, moored at Vincent Pier.
