= Cutter (boat) =

Type of boat

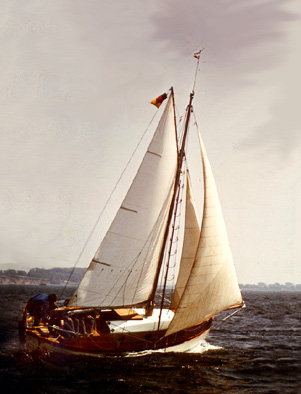
A gaff cutter, Kleine Freiheit, with a genoa jib set

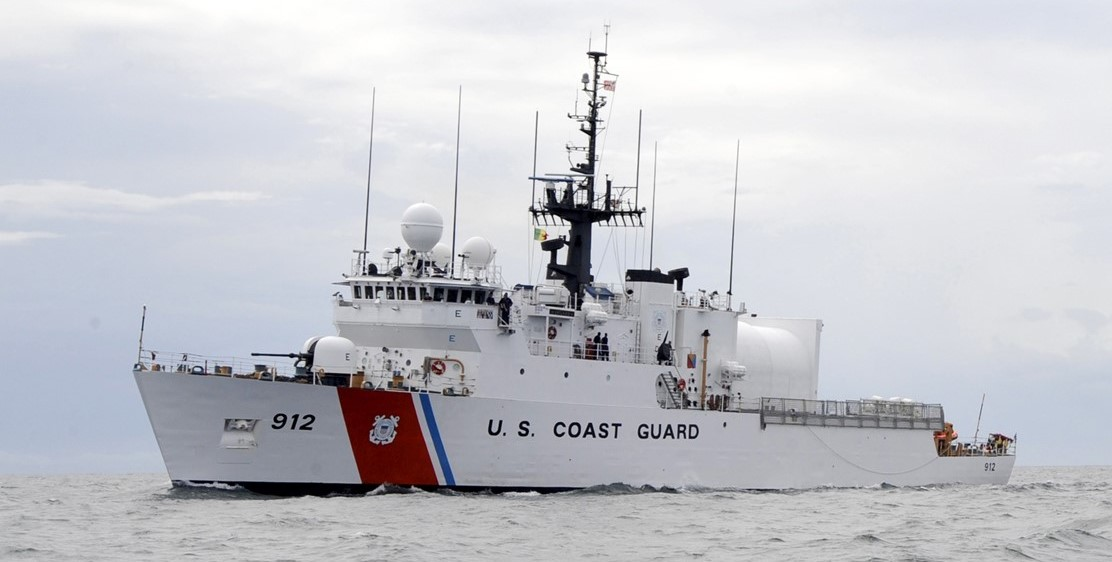
USCGC Legare, an example of a US Coast Guard cutter

A cutter is any of various types of watercraft. The term can refer to the rig (sail plan) of a sailing vessel (but with regional differences in definition), to a governmental enforcement agency vessel (such as a coast guard or border force cutter), to a type of ship's boat which can be used under sail or oars, or, historically, to a type of fast-sailing vessel introduced in the 18th century, some of which were used as small warships.

As a sailing rig, a cutter is a single-masted boat, with two or more headsails. (Note: In this context, a headsail is a sail set forward (in front) of the mast. It is triangular in shape and the luff (front) may be hanked (fastened) to a stay that supports the mast, or it may be set flying (not attached to any stay). Where two headsails are set, the most forward one is called a jib, and the one nearer the mast is a staysail. A jib topsail may be set as a third sail, positioned above the jib and hoisted to a higher point, such as on a topmast.) On the eastern side of the Atlantic, the two headsails on a single mast is the fullest extent of the modern definition. In U.S. waters, a greater level of complexity applies, with the placement of the mast and the rigging details of the bowsprit taken into account – so a boat with two headsails may be classed as a sloop.

Government agencies use the term "cutter" for vessels employed in patrolling their territorial waters and other enforcement activities. This terminology is derived from the sailing cutters which had this sort of role from the 18th century to the end of the 19th century. (See below.) Whilst the details vary from country to country, generally these are small ships that can remain at sea for extended periods and in all usual weather conditions. Many, but not all, are armed. Uses include control of a country's borders and preventing smuggling.

Cutters as ship's boats came into use in the early 18th century (dating which roughly coincides with the decked sailing vessels described below). These were clinker-built open boats which were fitted for propulsion by both oar and sail. They were more optimised for sailing than the barges and pinnaces that were types of ship's boat used in the Royal Navy – one distinctive resulting feature of this was the washstrake added to increase the freeboard. It was pierced with rowlock cut-outs for the oars, so that the thwarts did not need to be set unusually high to achieve the right geometry for efficient use.

Cutters, as decked sailing vessels designed for speed, came into use in the early part of the 18th century. When first introduced, the term applied largely to the hull form, in the same way that clipper was used almost a hundred years later. Some of these 18th and 19th century examples were rigged as ketches or brigs. However, the typical rig, especially in Naval or revenue protection use, was a single-masted rig setting a huge amount of sail. Square sails were set, as well as a full complement of fore and aft sails. In civilian use, cutters were mostly involved in smuggling. The navy and coastguard therefore also used cutters in an attempt to catch those operating illegally.

== Decked cutters of 18th and 19th centuries ==
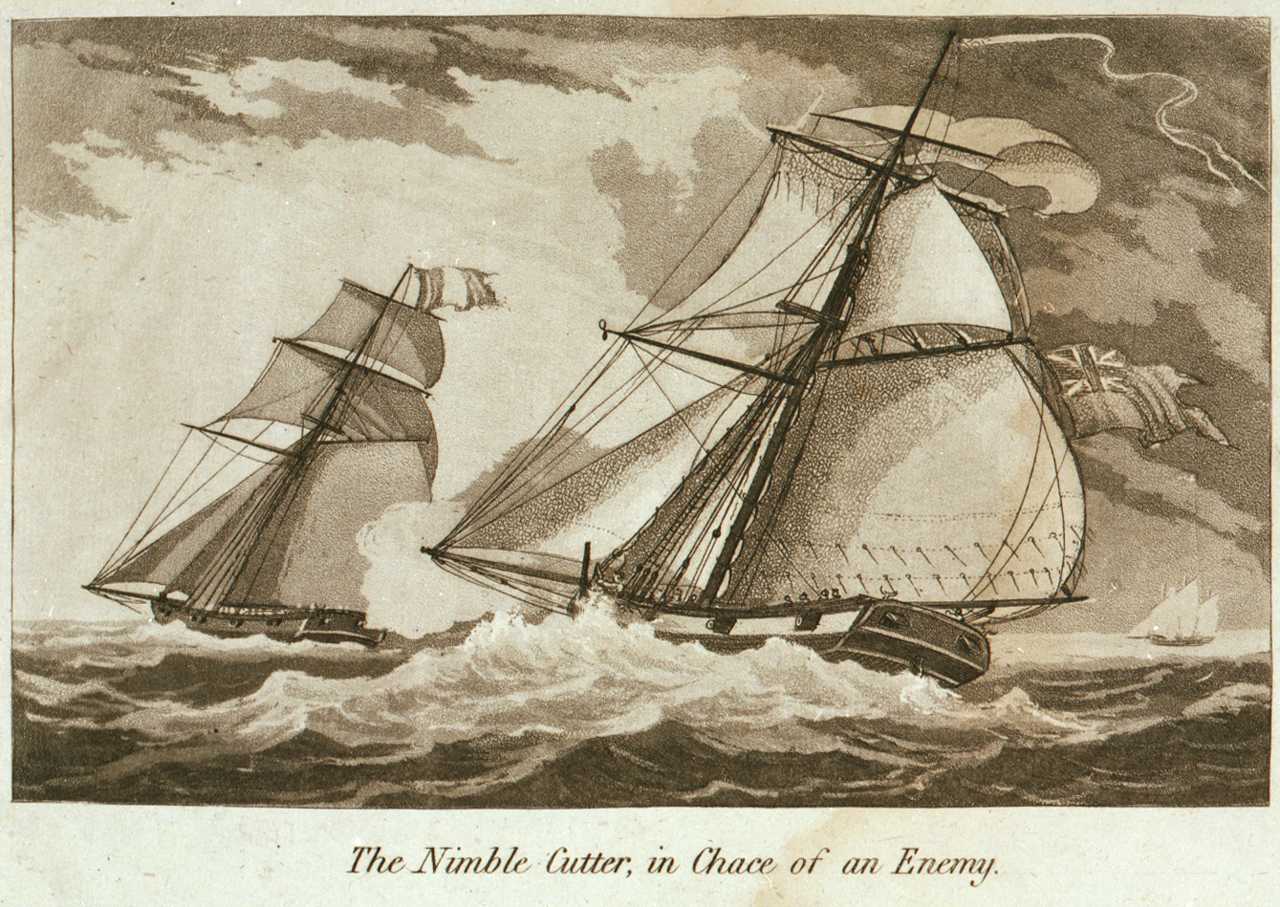
Illustration of the British cutter HMS Nimble chasing a French cutter in 1781

The term cutter appeared in the early 18th century as a description of a hull type. These vessels were designed for speed and the name was used in a similar way to clipper in the next century. The concept of hull type was perpetuated by the term "cutter brig" which was used over the period circa 1781–1807 for those rigged as brigs. "Cutter built" was a description applied to a hull of this type and designed for speed. More generally, the unmodified word "cutter" soon became associated with a single-masted rig.

Fast vessels were often used for illegal purposes, such as smuggling, or by the authorities trying to prevent this illegality. Therefore, cutters were used for both. The Royal Navy bought and had built a large number for use in controlling smuggling, as "advice boats" (carrying dispatches), or against privateers.

The characteristic cutter hull shape was wide; many had a length to breadth ratio of 3 to 1. It had a lot of deadrise and fine lines. A huge amount of sail could be set on these beamy hulls. The rig became standardised as having one mast, a gaff-rigged mainsail, square sails and several headsails – together with a full range of extra light weather sails. The mainsail had a boom that extended beyond the stern. Square sails consisted of a course, topsail and topgallant. In earlier examples (before 1800) the topsail's foot had a large amount of roach and was sheeted to a separate yard that was set below the main yard (which carried the course). (Note: The roach in a sail is a curve cut into an edge. In this instance, it is a concave curve in the foot, or lower edge, of the square topsail. This allows the sail to set clear of the forestays, yet still have a large vertical extent along the leeches (the vertical edges of a square sail).) The headsails were a staysail, set on the forestay (which fastened to the stemhead), a jib, set flying to a traveller on the bowsprit and, in most cases, a flying jib (alternatively termed a jib-topsail) also set flying, but to a higher point on the mast. A cutter has a running bowsprit, which can be brought inboard when not needed, such as in rough weather or in harbour. The bowsprit was usually of great length, sometimes longer than the hull. The standard fair weather sails consisted of a ringtail to the mainsail and studding sails to the square sails. It was not unknown for cutters to use a removable mizzen mast for use when reaching, setting a lugsail. Since the boom of the mainsail overhung the stern, the mast would have to be removed to tack or gybe.

The dimensions of an 18th-century cutter purchased by the Royal Navy in 1763, and roughly in the middle of the size range of the batch of 30 bought that year HMS Fly are: length on deck 47 feet 6 inches (14.48 m), beam 20 feet 10.25 inches (6.3564 m), measuring just over 78 tons bm. Smuggling cutters ranged from 30 tons (captured in 1747) to 140 tons. The Revenue cutters increased in size to match the vessels they attempted to catch – Repulse, of 210 tons was built in 1778. A determining factor on size was the number of crew needed to handle the large gaff mainsail with its long boom. Larger cutters purchased by the Royal Navy were sometimes converted to brigs to make them easier to handle, but still utilising the fast hull.

== Ship's boat ==
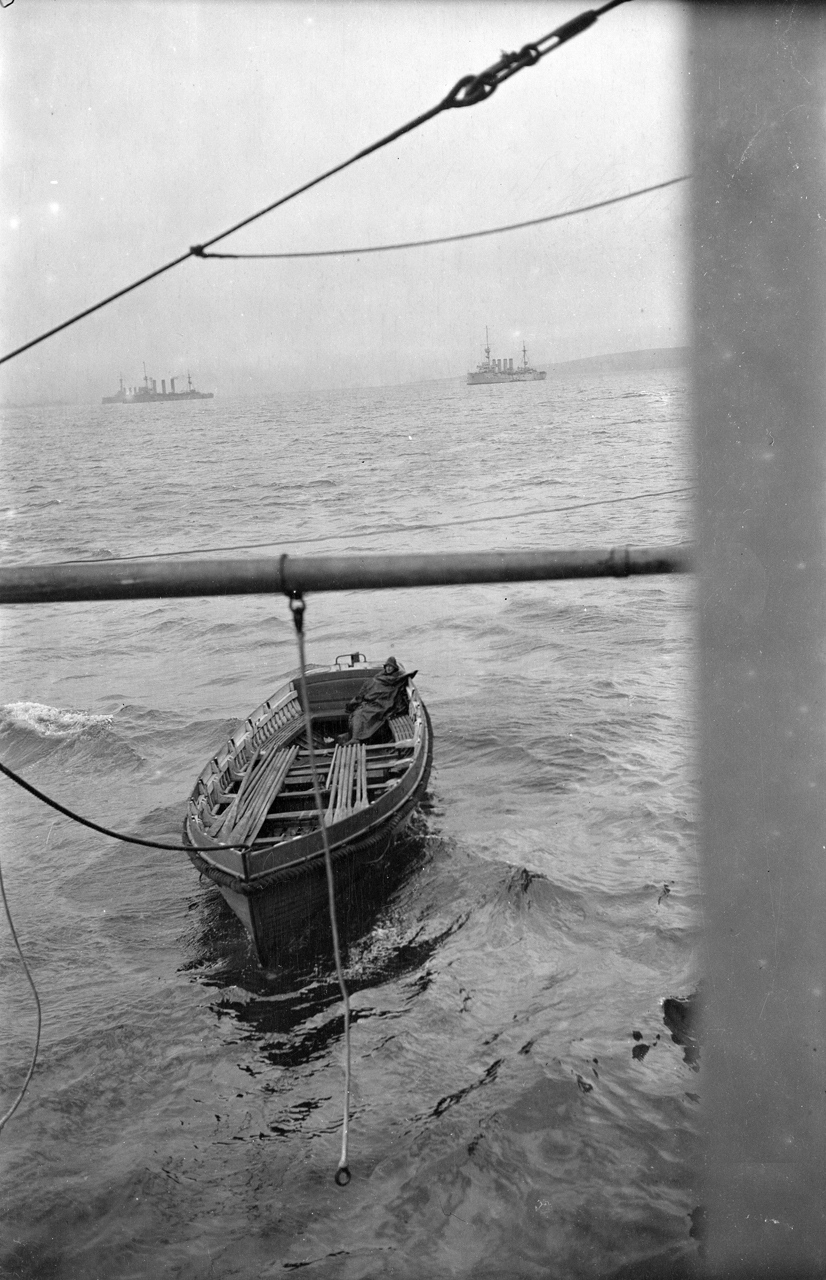
A cutter secured to a boat boom, ready for use, alongside an anchored battleship during the First World War

At about the same time that the decked, fast-sailing cutters of the 18th century appeared, the term was also applied to a new class of ship's boat. These were clinker-built open boats, optimised for sailing but capable under oars. They had finer lines than the boats of that time (which had more rounded bows) and a transom stern. A distinctive feature was that the washstrake had cut-outs (called rowlocks) in which the oars were worked, unlike most boats of the period, that used thole pins as the pivot point for the oars. (Note: The Royal Navy later introduced rowlocks cut into the washstrake in other types of boats, so this is not a reliable method of identifying the type of boat in, say, a photograph.) This allowed a higher freeboard, which was helpful if sailing – when the cut-outs were filled with wooden shutters (often mis-called poppets (Note: A poppet is the vertical piece of timber supporting the washstrake in a boat. The name was commonly mis-used for the neighbouring piece of wood, the shutter that was used to close a rowlock to keep water out.)) to keep the water out. The alternative, if the correct geometry for an efficient rowing position was adopted, was to position the thwarts awkwardly high.

Like some other types of ship's boats used in the Royal Navy, the cutter appears to have originated in Deal. Some Navy Board correspondence of 1712 concerns disapproval of the captain of HMS Rochester for buying a cutter of about 20 feet (6.1 m) in length as a replacement for her pinnace. In 1722, another ship had a cutter issued for a voyage to India, and by 1740 substantial numbers of cutters were being bought from Deal boatbuilders to equip Navy ships. The size of these boats varied from 15 to 20 feet (4.6 to 6.1 m) in length.

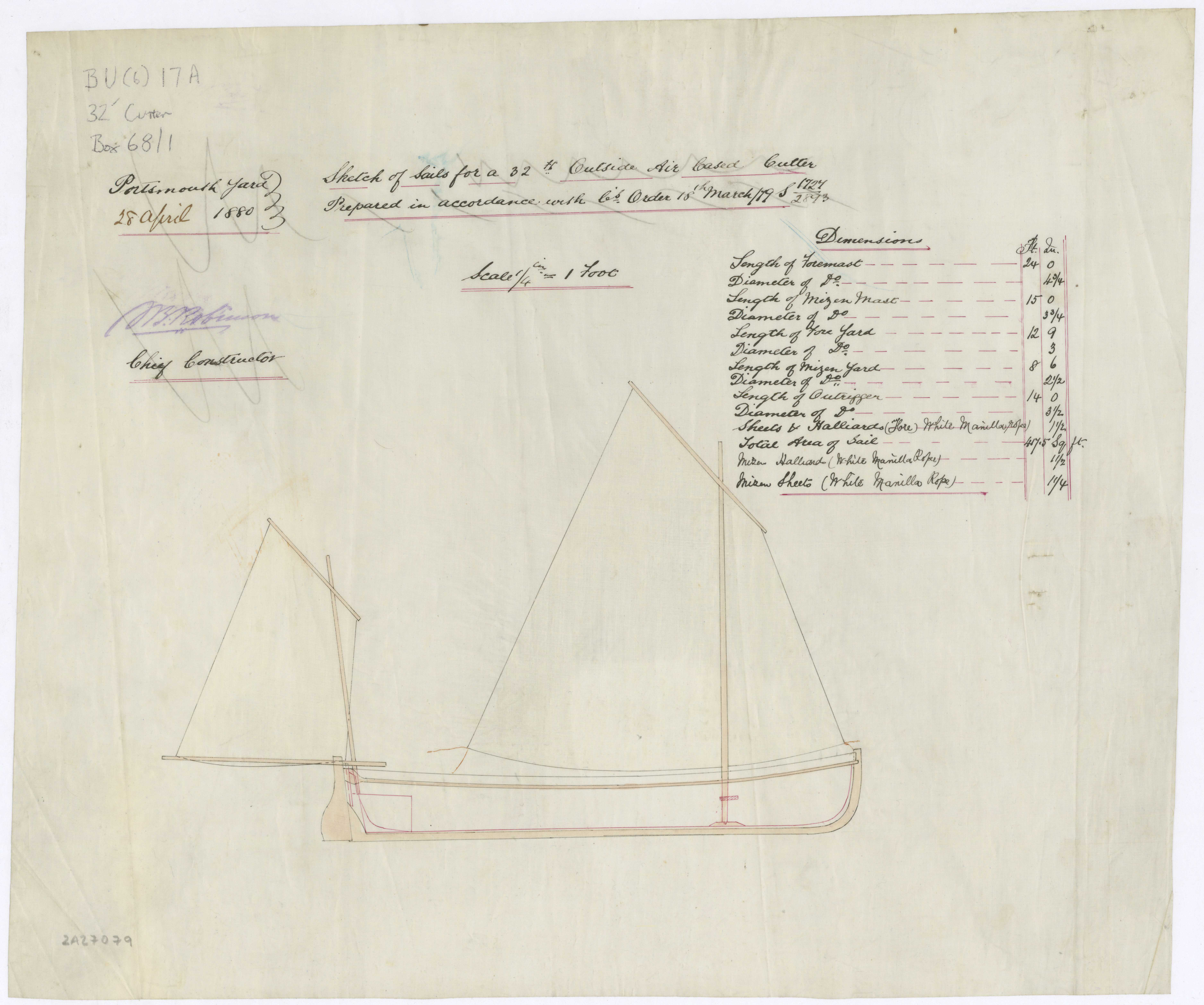
An 1880 sail plan for a 32 foot Royal Navy cutter

The 1740 purchases coincided with a decision to increase the number of boats carried by warships. During the Seven Years' War cutters were found particularly useful for cruising ships, being seaworthy and useful for boarding. However, they were more susceptible to damage than the heavier boats that they replaced and much less capable of carrying heavy weights, such as anchors and water casks. The range of sizes available steadily increased. By 1817 the cutters issued came in 17 different lengths, from 12 to 34 feet (3.7 to 10.4 m). This big variety was reduced when the Royal Navy's warships moved to steam propulsion. Since drinking water could now be distilled on board, ships no longer needed to have the largest boats that they could carry to maximise the amount of water collected on each trip. The standard-issue cutters from 1877 to 1900 came in 11 different lengths, ranging from 16 to 34 feet (4.9 to 10.4 m). In 1914 this was cut to 5 sizes, ranging from 26 to 34 feet (7.9 to 10.4 m).

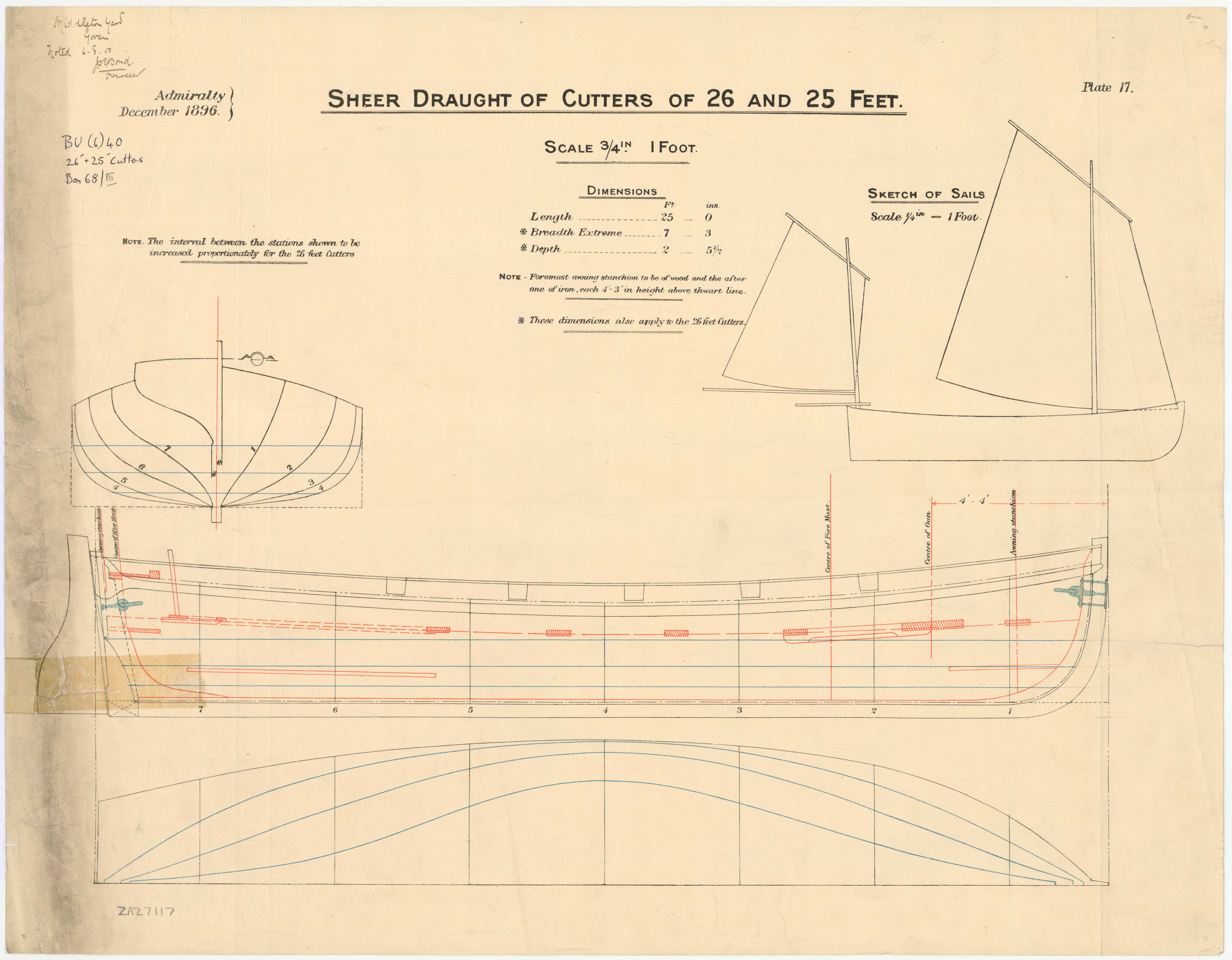
Plans of a 25 or 26 foot cutter, dated 1896, with sketch plan of sailing rig. There is provision for 10 oars, double-banked.

The sailing rig of the cutters used as ship's boats was usually two masted. (Note: The only common example of a Royal Navy ship's boat that had the sailing rig termed "cutter" was the longboat.) In 1761, the larger Deal-built cutters had spritsails set on these masts, soon transitioning to a dipping lug fore-sail and a sprit mizzen. For much of the 19th century, and into the 20th, cutters were rigged with a dipping lug on the foremast and a standing lug on the mizzen. This made them similar to many of the luggers worked from the beaches and harbours of Britain. The sail plan illustration here (1880 Sail Plan) even replicates the civilian lugger terminology of having a fore and mizzen mast, and not using the term "main mast". (Note: Many British luggers of the 19th century originally had 3 masts: fore, main and mizzen, but during the century, virtually all abandoned the main mast and simply set bigger sails on the foremast and mizzen. It is suggested that this gave more clear space for working fishing nets, handling anchors and cables, etc.) A variation on this rig, seen for example in 1887, was to have two dipping lugs.

The number of oars pulled varied with the size of the boat. A schedule of ship's boats of 1886 shows 34 to 30 feet (10.4 to 9.1 m) cutters pulling 12 oars, 28 feet (8.5 m), 10 oars, 26 to 20 feet (7.9 to 6.1 m), 8 oars and the two smallest sizes of 18 and 16 feet (5.5 and 4.9 m), 6 oars. The smaller boats could be single banked whilst the larger and later examples were generally double-banked. For transporting large numbers of men, in moderate weather conditions, a 34 ft cutter could carry a total of 66 men, a 26 ft cutter, 36 men and a 20 ft cutter, 21 men.

Steam powered ship's boats saw a slow introduction to the Royal Navy from 1864. By 1877, three types were in use: steam launches, picket boats and steam cutters. However, right up to the time of the First World War, the majority of the boats in use continued to be propelled solely by sail and oar. The Royal Navy still has some cutters that can be worked under sail or oar.

== Sailing rig ==
In the simpler definition, the sailing rig called "cutter" has a single mast with fore and aft sails which include more than one headsail. The mainsail (set abaft, or behind the mast) could be gaff, Bermuda, standing lug or gunter rigged. A more complex definition may be applied in American waters, where a boat with two headsails would be termed a sloop if the mast has a more forward position and the bowsprit is permanently rigged. An example of this is the Friendship Sloop. A traditional cutter, by contrast, has a running (Note: "Running" in this context means it is moveable during the normal operation of the boat – just as a halyard is running rigging and a shroud is standing rigging) bowsprit and the jib is set flying (Note: A sail, especially a jib, is set "flying" when it is not hanked to a stay but instead relies on the tension of the halyard to keep the luff taut) on a traveller that is hauled out to the end of the bowsprit. In a vessel such as a Bristol Channel Pilot Cutter, a storm jib might be set on a reefed bowsprit, with the bowsprit partially run in from its most fully extended position.

== Other types ==
=== Rowing ===
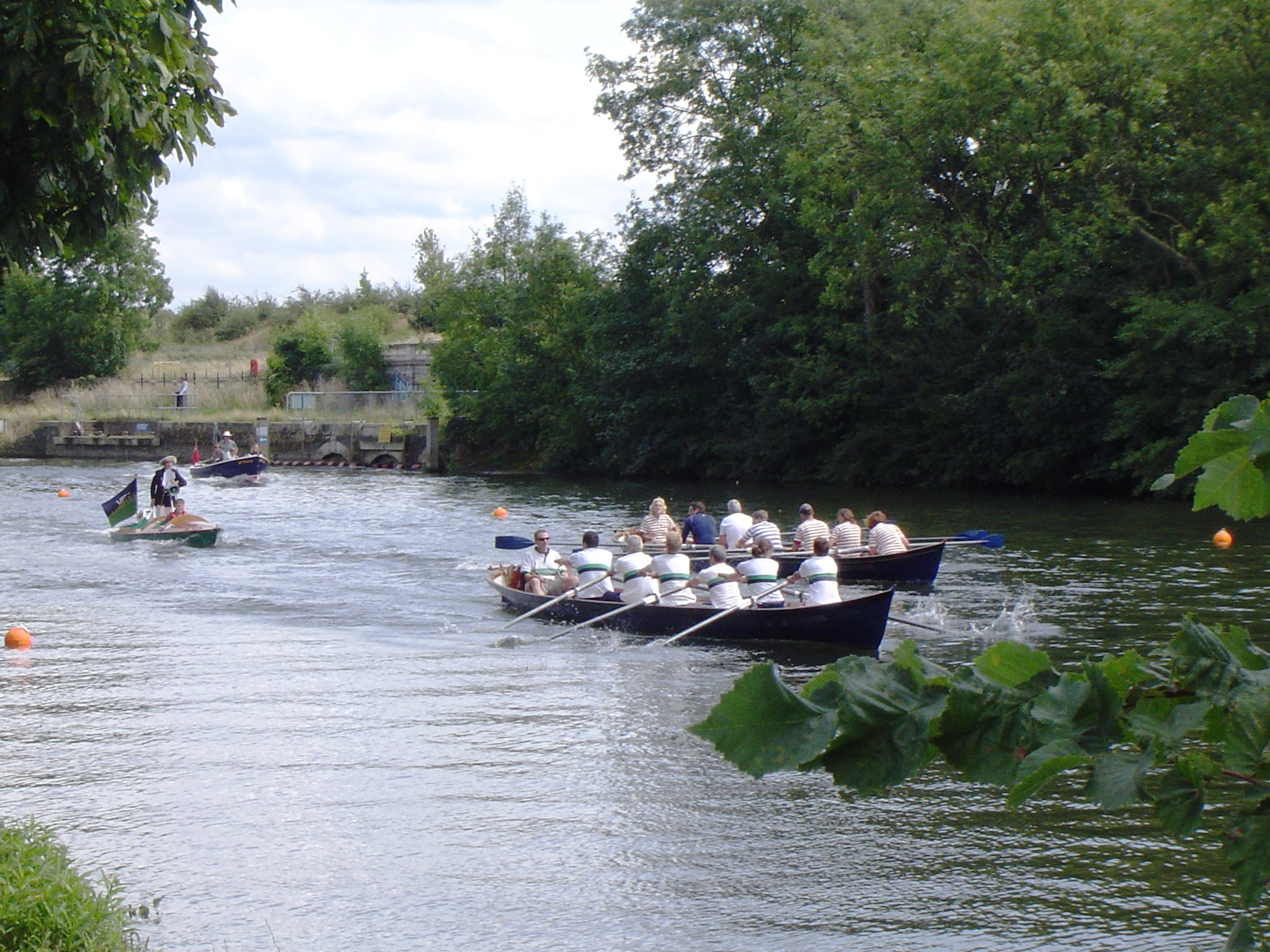
Cutter race at Sunbury Amateur Regatta

The watermen of London used similar boats in the 18th century often decorated as depicted in historical prints and pictures of the River Thames in the 17th and 18th centuries. The modern waterman's cutter is based on drawings of these boats. They are 34 feet (10 m) long with a beam of 4 ft 6 in (1.37 m). They can have up to six oarsmen either rowing or sculling and can carry a cox and passengers. The organisers of the Great River Race developed the modern version in the 1980s and now many of the fleet of 24 compete annually in a "Marathon of the River". Watermen's cutters also compete annually in the Port of London Challenge, and the Port Admirals' Challenge. Cutter races are also to be found at various town rowing and skiffing regattas. In addition the cutters perform the role of ceremonial Livery Barges with the canopies and armorial flags flying on special occasions.

Cutters have been used for record-breaking attempts and crews have achieved record times for sculling the English Channel (2 h 42 min) in 1996 and for sculling non-stop from London to Paris (4 days 15 min) in 1999. Events have been held with multiple teams attempting these challenges.

=== Pilot ===
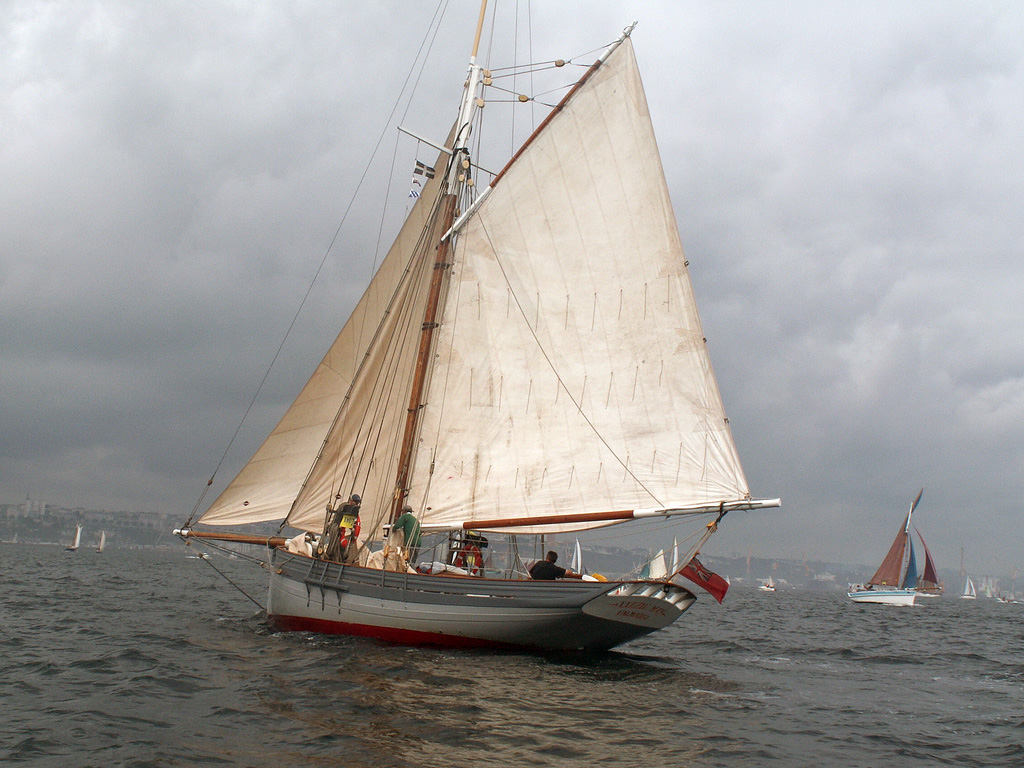
Wooden pilot cutter Lizzie May under sail in Brest, France

The pilot cutter developed from the need for a fast boat to take maritime pilots from harbour to incoming large trading vessels.

As most early pilots were local fisherman who undertook both jobs, although licensed by the harbour to operate within their jurisdiction, pilots were generally self-employed, and the quickest transport meant greater income. As their fishing boats were heavy working boats, and filled with fishing equipment, they needed a new type of boat; early boats were developed from single masted fishing cutter designs and twin masted yawls, and latterly into the specialist pilot cutter.

The natural dangers of the Bristol Channel brought about over many years the development of the specialist Bristol Channel Pilot Cutter. According to records from Pill, Somerset now housed in the Bristol Museum, the first official Bristol Channel pilot was barge master George James Ray, appointed by the Corporation of Bristol in May 1497 to pilot John Cabot's Matthew from Bristol harbour to the open sea beyond. In 1837 Pilot George Ray guided Brunel's SS Great Western, and in 1844 William Ray piloted the larger SS Great Britain on her maiden voyage.

=== Customs services ===
The term cutter is also used for any seaworthy vessel used in the law enforcement duties of the United Kingdom's Border Force, the United States Coast Guard (because of its descent from the United States Revenue Cutter Service) or the customs services of other countries.

In the United States, the early Revenue Cutter Service operated customs cutters that were commonly schooners or brigs. In Britain, they were usually rigged as defined under Sailing (above). The British Board of Customs also used other vessels as hulks, which were moored in places such as tidal creeks. Customs officers worked from the hulks in smaller boats.

In the UK, the Border Force (successor to the UK Border Agency and HM Customs and Excise) currently operates a fleet of 42 m corvette-type vessels throughout UK territorial waters as border cutters, inspecting vessels for illicit cargoes.

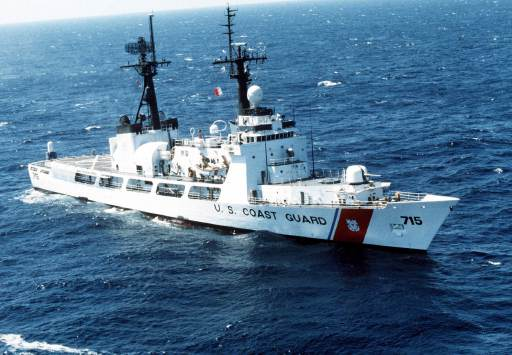
"High Endurance Cutter" USCGC Hamilton

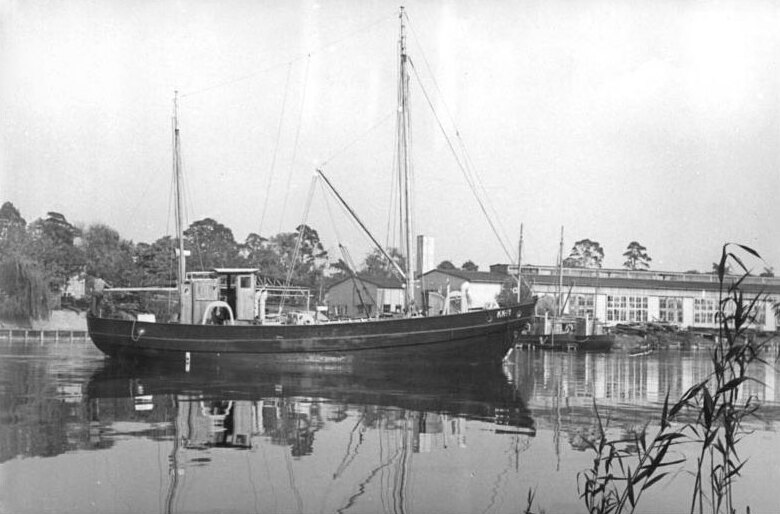
German Fishcutter, Jachtwerft, Köpenick, Berlin, 1950

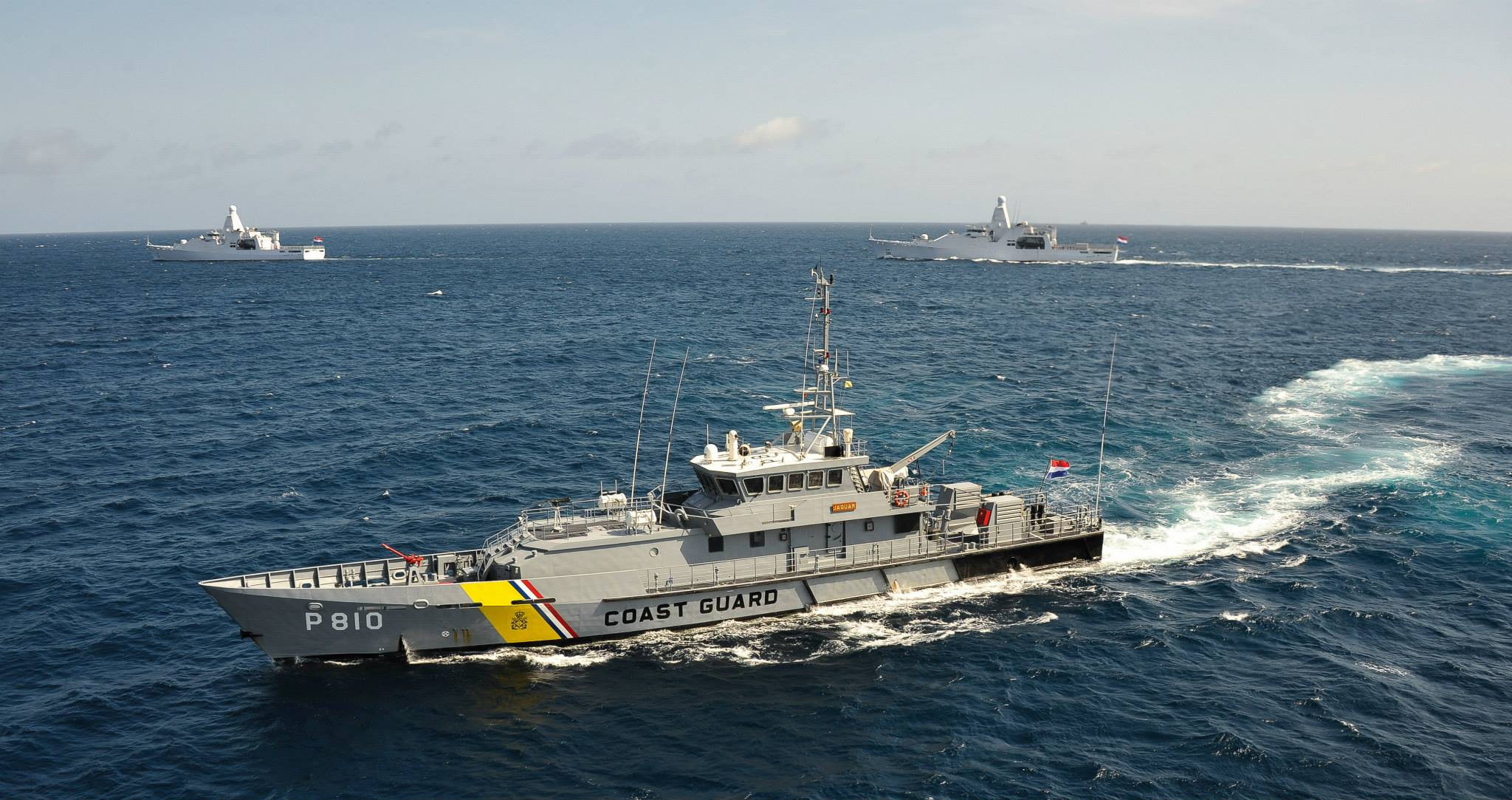
Dutch Caribbean Coast Guard cutter Jaguar

== See also ==
- Bristol Channel Pilot Cutter
- Clipper
