= Scots Herring Lassies strike in East Anglia 1938 =

The Scots Herring Lassies' Strike in East Anglia 1938 was a strike by female seasonal workers from Scotland who traveled to East Anglia in the United Kingdom to gut herring (which is a step in fish processing). "Lassie" is the word for "girl" in the Scots language.

Before the First World War, 80% of the herring catch at East Anglia had been exported to Russia, and the collapse of the Russian and German markets meant hardship for the herring industry during the 1920s and 1930s. It was still mostly Scottish, but the Scots were withdrawing. In 1925, they had 757 boats and 4,000 fisher women. By 1936 the numbers were about 460 and 2,000 respectively. In 1936, the fisher women went on strike, and succeeded in obtaining an increase in wages. By 1938, it was clear that many steam drifters were not earning enough to cover expenses.

In the autumn of 1938, the Scots herring women who traveled each year to the ports of Great Yarmouth and Lowestoft in East Anglia to gut herring went on strike over their pay and conditions. This strike was over the same issues as the strike two years before, plus their protest was directed against the general decline of the industry. This strike in 1938 was also in support of the men who operated the herring drifters which caught the herring. English boats were engaged in Sunday fishing, which the Scottish women said gave an unfair advantage to the English over the Scottish fishermen, as the Scottish fishermen did not fish on Sundays.
