= Nobby (boat) =

Type of fishing boat used in north-west England

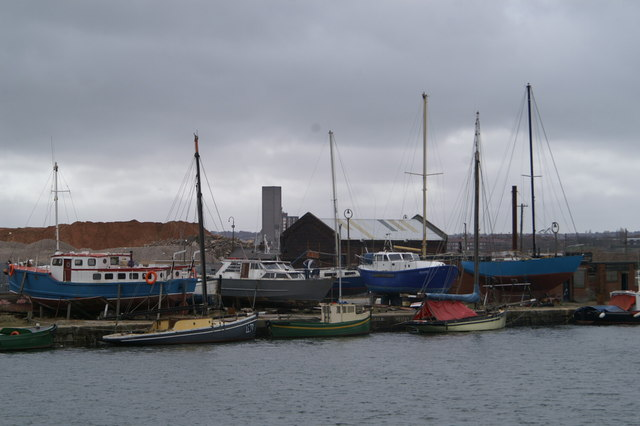

The nobby is an inshore sailing boat which was used as a traditional fishing boat around Lancashire and the Isle of Man. The Lancashire nobby originated in Morecambe Bay about 1840 and around Southport. It subsequently came into widespread use down the north west coast of England. The Manx nobby first appeared in the 1880s and was used around the Isle of Man. Many localities on the coast of Great Britain developed their own type of fishing boat adapted to local fishing and sea conditions, and the nobbies are examples of this.

== Lancashire nobby ==
The Lancashire nobby was primarily a shrimp trawler towing beam trawls sized for common "brown shrimp" (Crangon crangon), "pink shrimp" or "Aesop prawn" (Pandalus montagui), or flatfish. The nobby ranged in size from about 25 to 32 feet (7.6 to 9.8 m) for single-handed boats and from 36 to 45 feet (11 to 14 m) for two-man boats. They were all pole masted cutters with gaff topsail.

In the north west of England the Morecambe Bay nobby emerged about 1840 as the local type. Houldsworth illustrated them as a sloop rigged craft with a square tuck stern A report in the Lancaster Gazette of 7 November 1840 indicates that Southport smacks were also fishing in Morecambe Bay, providing another progenitor of the nobby.

The design evolved from earlier straight-stemmed, long-keel boats into a beamy shallow hull with a pronounced reverse curve in the midship section and a cut away forefoot. The square tuck stern changed into an immersed elliptical counter, either by evolution or adoption of the Southport form, the change being complete before 1880. All of the boats had wide side decks and a long cockpit, about a third of the beam in width, with low freeboard and a low rail to facilitate lifting the gear on board. These shrimp boats, about 32 ft long (9.8 m), were fast and handy in the shallow waters of Morecambe Bay. The larger boats were called “prawners”, though they were actually used to catch pink shrimps (Pandalus montagui). In addition to the larger prawner (called "sprawner" at Morecambe) a subtype called "bay boat" developed for the holiday trade. The bay boat had a shallow draft so it could operate around Grange-over-Sands at the head of Morecambe Bay.

Crossfields of Arnside were the most prolific builders with two yards working. Later branches of the family started yards at Conway and took over a yard at Hoylake. Many were constructed by Gibson at Fleetwood, later taken over by Liver and Wilding. In particular, William Stoba (1855–1931), a foreman shipwright with Fleetwood builders, developed the design and experimented with centreboards. Other builders were working at Annan, Millom, Crossens and Marshside near Southport.

The type was adopted by fishermen from the Solway down to Cardigan Bay, and hundreds of nobbies were built. The demand for boats was driven by the English taste for shrimps, which in its turn was driven by the English sea side holiday trade, which came to prominence with the railways in the 1850s. There was no standard design of nobby, alterations were made to suit the ideas of the original owners. Three racing classes, the Royal Mersey Restricted class, the Royal Mersey Rivers class and the Fleetwood Jewel Class, were built on nobby lines by various local boat builders. The difference between these was that the Royal Mersey Restricted class and the Fleetwood Jewels Class were cutter rigged same as a Nobby and the Royal Mersey Rivers Class had a single headsail.

It is important to understand that the two types (Manx and Lancashire) are completely different. The shrimping boats (Morecambe Bay, Liverpool etc.) are shallow draught vessels [typically 3 to 4.5 feet (0.91 to 1.37 m)] designed to trawl in the shoal waters of the Solway Firth, Morecambe Bay etc.

In contrast, the Manx Nobby is a herring lugger, a deep-water vessel typically drawing 6 ft plus (1.8 m) and built to lie to nets in deep water while drift net fishing for herring and mackerel.

The Manx Nobby is similar to the cornish luggers.

=== Period of decline ===
External image
- Gallery of converted Nobbys

At other nobby ports the changing economics of fishing with engines meant that fewer new nobbys were built, so that most of the nobby builders retired from trade during the Second World War. The nobbies went into gradual decline, and were eventually sold cheaply and converted to yachts

Over the last 20 years the Nobby Owners Association has restored to sail some 20 nobbies, which are basically Morecambe Bay inshore sail fishing boats, associated with the North West coast of England and which evolved to their present graceful form through the 19th century.

== Manx nobby ==
External image
- Model of the Manx nobby Gladys

The Manx nobby was a double ended standing lug-rigged herring drifter. It was preceded by the "nickie", which had a dipping lug rigging. Standing lugs have yards that remain on one side of the mast and the tack is set close to the mast, while dipping lugs have yards that dip around the mast when going about so that the sail draws away from the mast on each tack. The Nickies were copies of Cornish herring drifters that visited Man. The Manx Nickie was so called as Nicholas was a common Christian name amongst the Cornish crews whose boats they copied. The change to standing lug was driven by a shortage of experienced crew. This type of craft was then commissioned by The Congested Districts Board to provide a decked fishing craft to be used in Connemara, Ireland in the 1890s.

The vocabulary of the Anglo-Manx dialect quotes the first Manx nobby in 1884 receiving its name because it was “a rale nobby little thing”. Other nobbies may have received their name in the same way, as smart sail fishing boats.
