= Boats that Built Britain =

- DVD cover
- Genre: Documentary
- Directed by: Lawrence Walford
- Presented by: Tom Cunliffe
- Country of origin: United Kingdom
- Original language: English
- No. of series: 1
- No. of episodes: 6

Production
- Producer: Lawrence Walford

Original release
- Network: BBC Four
- Release: 4 May – 19 May 2010

The Boats that Built Britain is a British documentary television series directed by Lawrence Walford and produced by Form Films for the BBC. Presented by sailor and writer Tom Cunliffe, it covers various significant ships in the maritime history of Britain. The show was broadcast in 6 episodes, first broadcast on BBC Four from 4 May 2010, before starting on BBC Two from 15 May 2010. The show was produced in conjunction with an exhibition at the National Maritime Museum.

== Episodes ==
1. "The Matthew" - Cunliffe sails a replica of Matthew, sailed by John Cabot in 1497, the first Western boat to discover America
2. "The Pickle" - Cunliffe sails a replica of HMS Pickle, the first ship to bring the news of Nelson's victory at the Battle of Trafalgar back to Great Britain
3. "The Phoenix" - Cunliffe sails Phoenix, a 1929 Danish built example of the archetypal 'square rigger', crucial to the rise in 19th century British trade
4. "The Reaper" - Cunliffe sails the restored 1901 built Reaper, the biggest sailing lugger ever to fish the seas
5. "Bristol Channel Pilot Cutter" - Cunliffe sails the 1904 built Cariad, an example of a Bristol Channel Pilot Cutter, considered by many to be the finest sailing boat design ever
6. "World War Two Landing Craft" - Cunliffe sails an LCVP (Landing Craft Vehicle and Personnel), the 'one boat did more to win World War II than any other piece of machinery'
