= Lawrence Walford =

British television producer and director

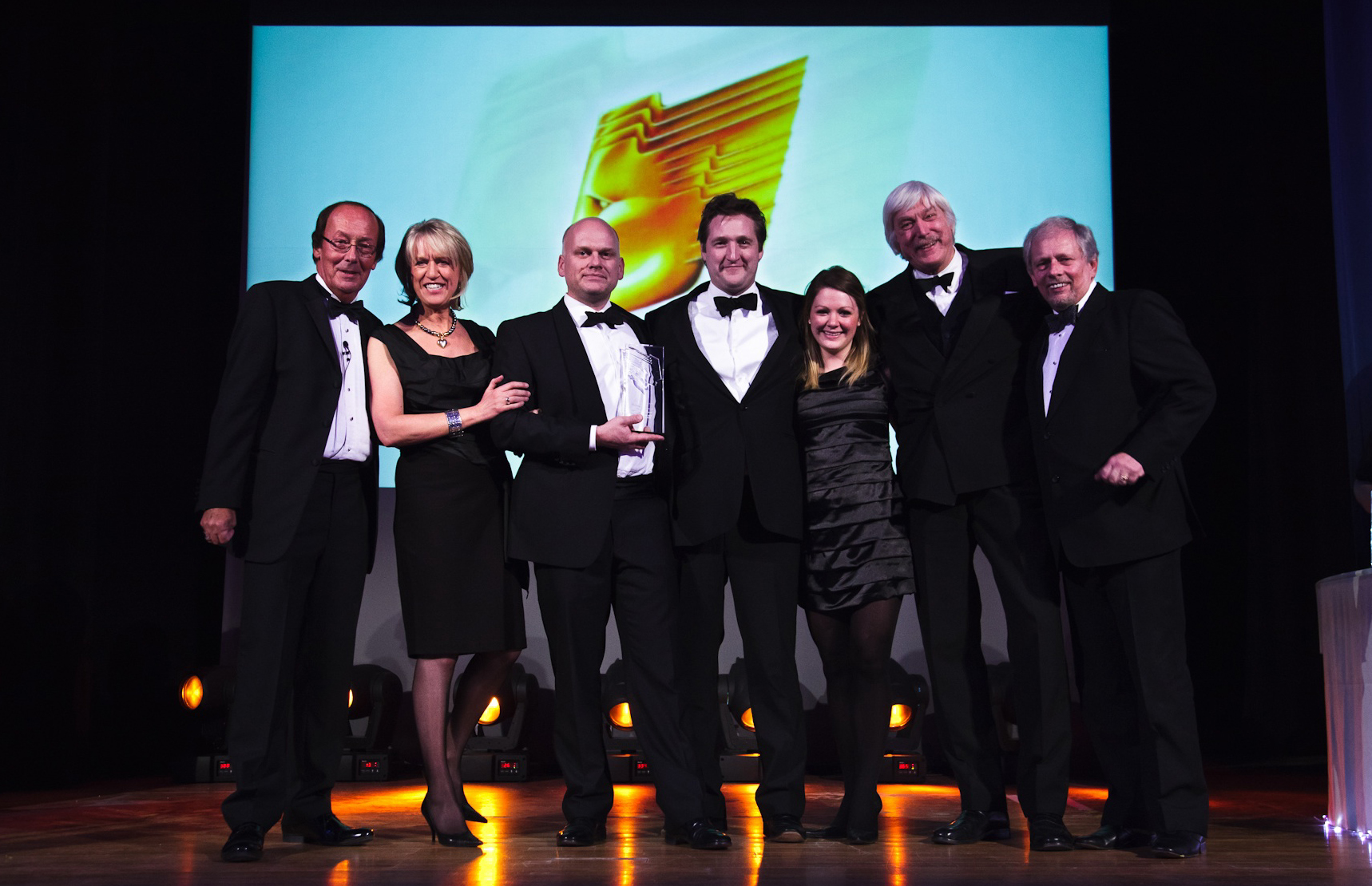
RTS Awards

Lawrence (Larry) Walford is a British television producer and director.

Walford's film Catching The Tax Dodgers was described by The Guardian as "a nuanced piece of storytelling, peppered with fascinating human anthropology, a surprising, fascinating piece of television, full of unexpected wonder."

His company FORM Films won the Royal Television Society Award for Best Factual Series for The Boats that Built Britain.

In 2025 he launched the independent production company Creation Content. The company focuses on unscripted factual and entertainment programming designed for both traditional broadcasters and digital platforms. Creation Content secured early development projects with Channel 4 and the BBC and has positioned itself at the intersection of linear television, streaming and creator-led content.

== Notable Television ==
- The Commuters 1998
- Hitlers Third Reich 1998
- Living In The Dead Zone, 1999 Editor
- County Kilburn, 2000 Editor
- The Ante, 2001
- Fame Academy, 2002 Series Editor
- Boat Yard, 2005 Executive Producer
- Floating Kitchen, 2007 Executive Producer
- The Real Pink Panther, 2008 Executive Producer
- Twitchers A Very British Obsession, 2010 Executive Producer
- Boats that Built Britain, 2011 Series Director
- Reza Spice Prince of India, 2013 Executive Producer
- The Restoration Man, 2014 Series Producer
- Ross Kemp's Britain, 2015 Series Producer
- Ill Gotten Gains, 2016 to 2020 Executive Producer
- Catching The Tax Dodgers, 2017 Producer and Director
- How To Start An Airline, 2018 Executive Producer
- The Real Bling Ring : Hollywood Heist, 2021 Executive Producer
- Hotel Custody, 2022 Executive Producer
- Italia 90: When Football Changed Forever ,2022 Executive Producer
- Jared From Subway: Catching A Monster ,2023 Executive Producer
- SAS: Catching The Criminals ,2024 Executive Producer
- Virgin Island (TV series), 2025 Creative Director
- Confessions of A Steroid Gang ,2025 Executive Producer
- Secret Africa: Into The Wild ,2026 Executive Producer
