= Drifter (fishing boat) =

Type of fishing boat

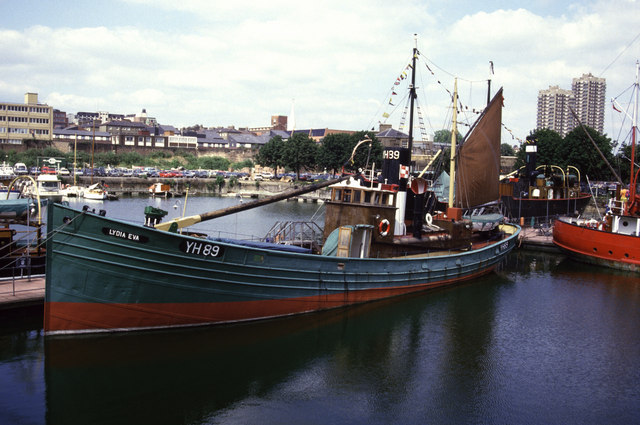
The Lydia Eva is the last surviving steam drifter of the herring fishing fleet based in Great Yarmouth

A drifter is a type of fishing boat. They were designed to catch herring in a long drift net. Herring fishing using drifters has a long history in the Netherlands and in many British fishing ports, particularly in East Scottish ports.

Until the mid-1960s fishing fleets in the North Sea comprised drifters and trawlers, with the drifters primarily targeting herring while the trawlers caught cod, plaice, skate and haddock, etc. By the mid-1960s the catches were greatly diminishing, particularly the herring. Consequently, the drifter fleet disappeared and many of the trawlers were adapted to work as service ships for the newly created North Sea oil rigs.

Some history of drifters is covered in Scottish east coast fishery.

Drifters preserved as museum ships include Lydia Eva, a steam drifter of the herring fishing fleet based in Great Yarmouth, Norfolk, and Reaper, a restored Scottish Fifie herring drifter at the Scottish Fisheries Museum.

Naval drifters were boats built in the same way used by the Royal Navy primarily to maintain and patrol anti-submarine nets. They were either purpose-built for naval use or requisitioned from private owners.

== Image gallery ==
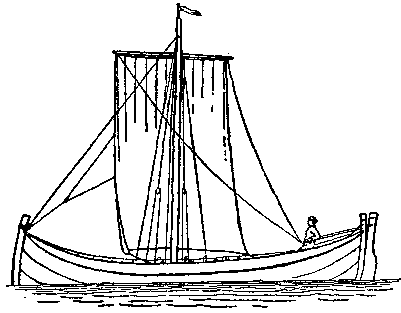
Norse herring drifter, c 1200 AD

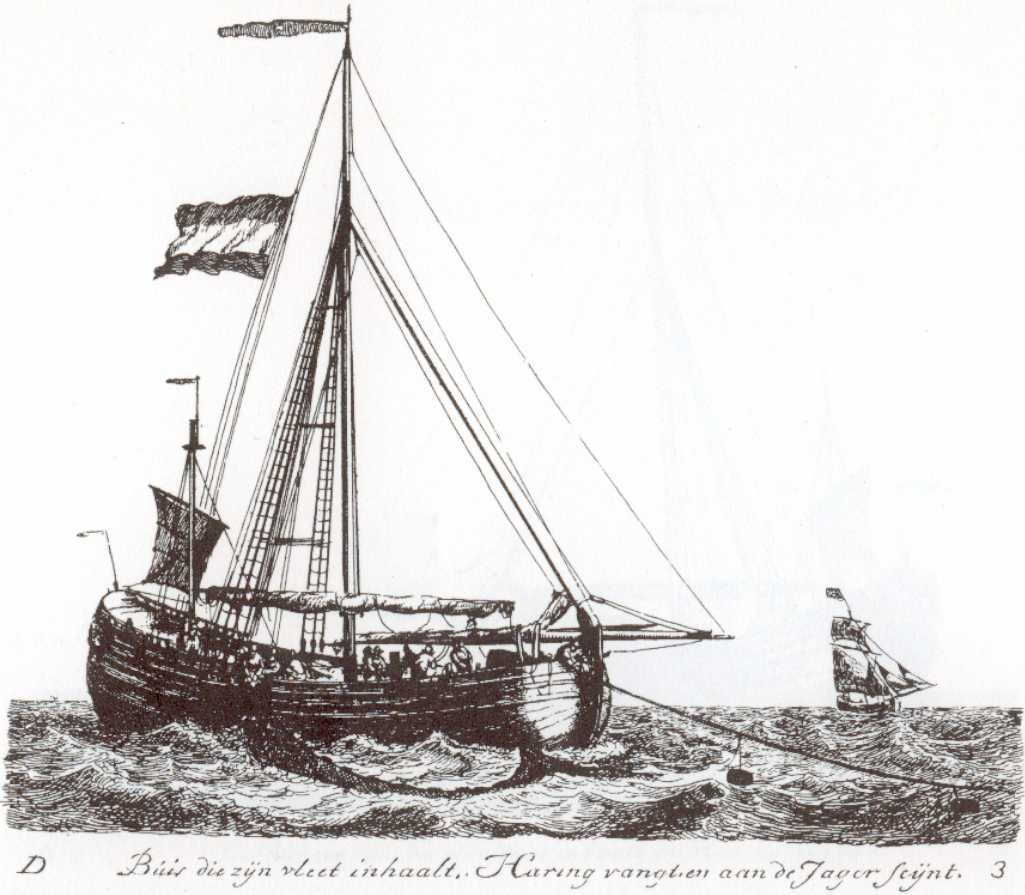
Dutch Herring Buss drifter taking aboard its drift net, c. 1600

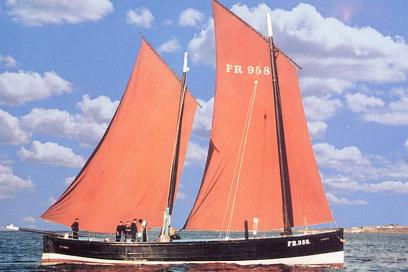
The Reaper, a restored fifie herring drifter, was originally built c. 1902

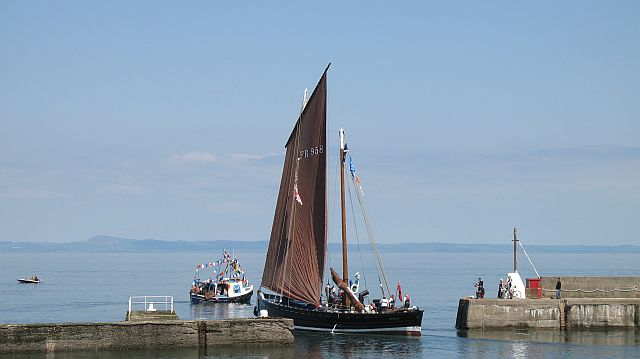
The Reaper leaving Port Seton. Fifies like this were used for fishing off the coast of Scotland from the 1850s until well into the 20th century.

== See also ==
- Herring Buss (Dutch precursor to the drifter)
- Fifie (widely used early drifter in Scotland)
- Manx nobby
- History of fishing in the United Kingdom
- Tradewind (schooner)
- Wylde Swan
