= Bristol Channel pilot cutter =

Type of sailing boat

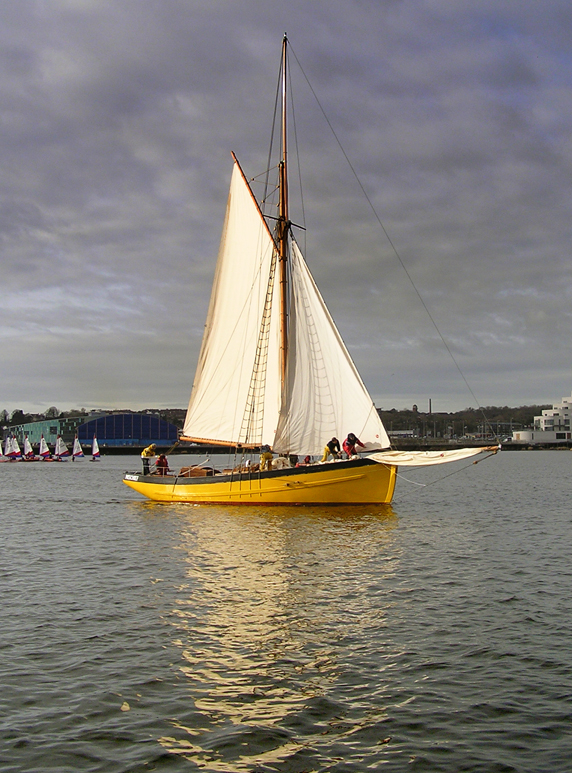
The pilot cutter Mischief

A Bristol Channel pilot cutter is a type of sailing boat used until the early part of the 20th century to deliver and collect pilots to and from merchant vessels using ports in the Bristol Channel. Each pilot worked individually, in competition with other pilots. Especially after 1861, the level of competition required larger and faster cutters, as pilots went "seeking" (looking for a ship that required a pilot to a Bristol Channel port) at much greater distances. The resulting boats were known for their ability to sail in the most extreme weather, for speed and sea-kindliness. They were designed for short handed sailing, often manned only by a man and an apprentice, with one or sometimes two pilots on board.

Bristol Channel pilot cutters were referred to as "skiffs" by their crews on the English side of the channel, and "yawls" by those working from Welsh ports. These names suggest the type of craft used as pilot boats before the pilot cutter type took over the role. (Note: In the terminology of British inshore craft, in many locations the words "skiff" and "yawl" designated essentially the same sort of vessel: a clinker built double ended open boat, usually worked from a beach or a small harbour, and each example being capable of using oar or sail for propulsion.)

The design has been described by some as the best sailing boat design ever.

The system of competition between individual pilots was steadily removed in the period 1908 – 1923, as each individual pilot district instituted a co-operative amalgamation of pilots who then worked a rota system to provide a service. This greatly reduced the number of sailing pilot cutters required, and these were soon replaced by steam-powered cutters that remained on station to provide a pilotage service. Bristol pilots amalgamated in 1923, but kept two of the cutters as stand-by vessels in case of breakdown of the steam pilot cutter.

== Background ==
=== Bristol Channel ===
The Bristol Channel is one of the most dangerous stretches of water in the world, due to its huge tidal range of over 14 metres (46 ft) – second only to the Bay of Fundy in Eastern Canada – currents hitting 7 knots (8.1 mph) (faster than many sailing ships of the day); all combining to hide rocks and constantly shifting sand bars.

The Channel can be a hazardous area of water because of its strong tides and the rarity of havens on the north Devon and Somerset coasts that can be entered in all states of the tide. Because of the treacherous waters, pilotage is an essential service for shipping.

As Bristol developed as a regional trading and financial centre, and as coal exports and the metal making industries rose in the South Wales Valleys as local sources of metal ore dwindled, the volume of shipping into and out of the Bristol Channel rose quickly. Owners who didn't want to lose valuable ships or cargo needed local knowledge of the wind, tides and underwater hazards.

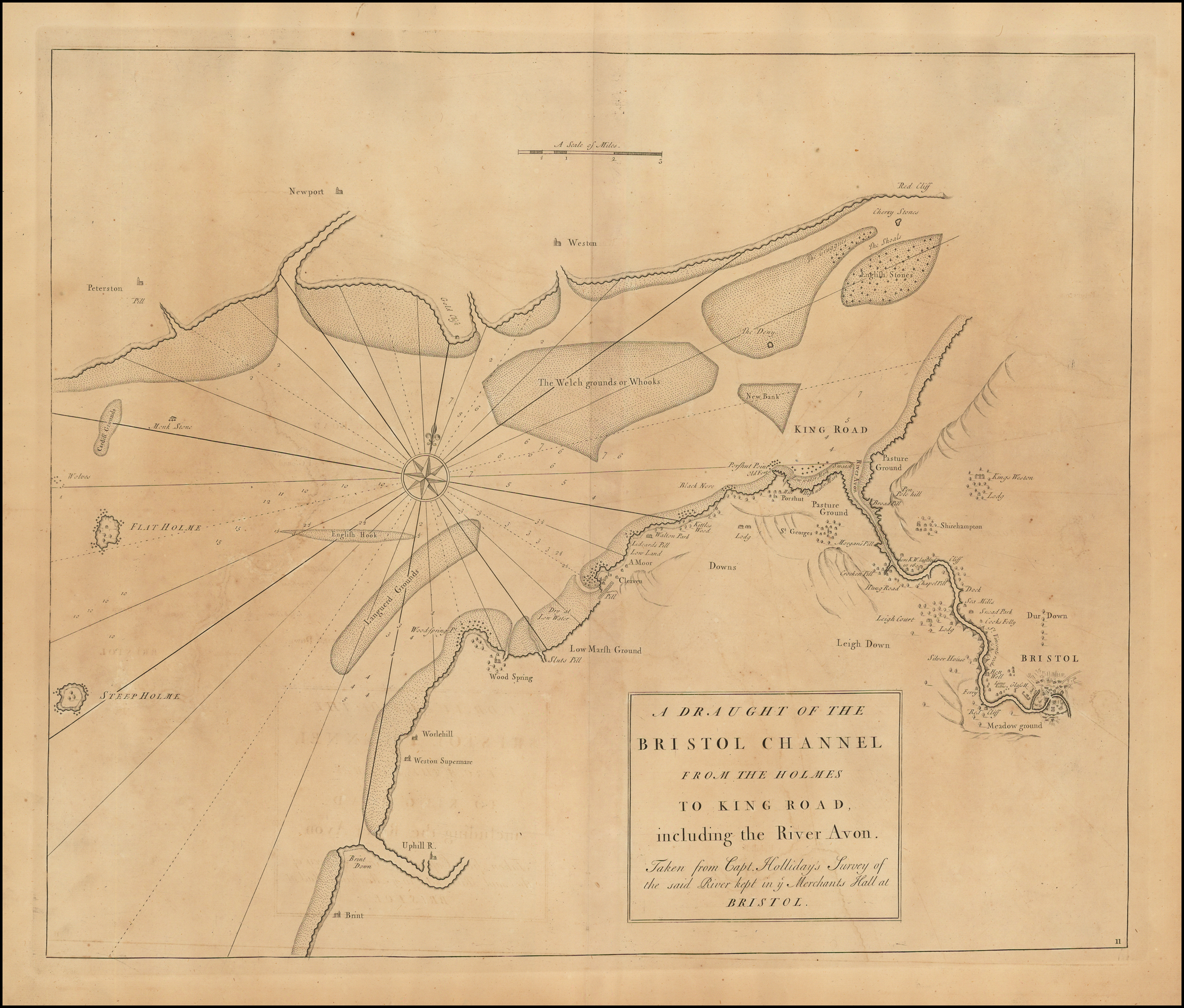
Early 18th century chart of the eastern part of the Bristol Channel, approximating to the area (until 1807) over which Bristol had control of the authorisation of pilots

=== History of pilotage in the Bristol Channel ===
There is a tradition that John Cabot used the services of the Bristol pilot on his 1497 voyage. Definitive historical records from 1611 show the delegation of authority over pilotage from the Bristol Corporation to the Society of Merchant Venturers of Bristol. The geographic extent of this authority was along the English coast from King Road (off the mouth of the Avon) to Uphill, then a line out to the islands of Steep Holm and Flat Holm, then to Aust and back along the south bank of the Severn to the mouth of the Avon. The port of Swansea was given control of its own pilotage by the Swansea Harbour Act 1791 (31 Geo. 3. c. 83) – but it is not clear if that was subordinate to Bristol.

The Bristol Channel Pilotage Act 1807 (47 Geo. 3 Sess. 2. c. xxxiii) gave Bristol authority over pilotage to all ports in the Bristol Channel to the east of Lundy. In 1836 and 1840, Cardiff unsuccessfully sought control of the pilots serving their port. By 1861 they had almost as many pilots working there as Bristol. Working with Newport and Gloucester, Cardiff got Parliament to pass the Bristol Channel Pilotage Act 1861 (24 & 25 Vict. c. ccxxxvi), which gave independence to these ports. The ports of Bideford and Barnstaple are believed never to have fallen under Bristol's authority (despite being to the east of Lundy). Barry gained authority over their own pilotage in 1885.

== Design and performance needs ==
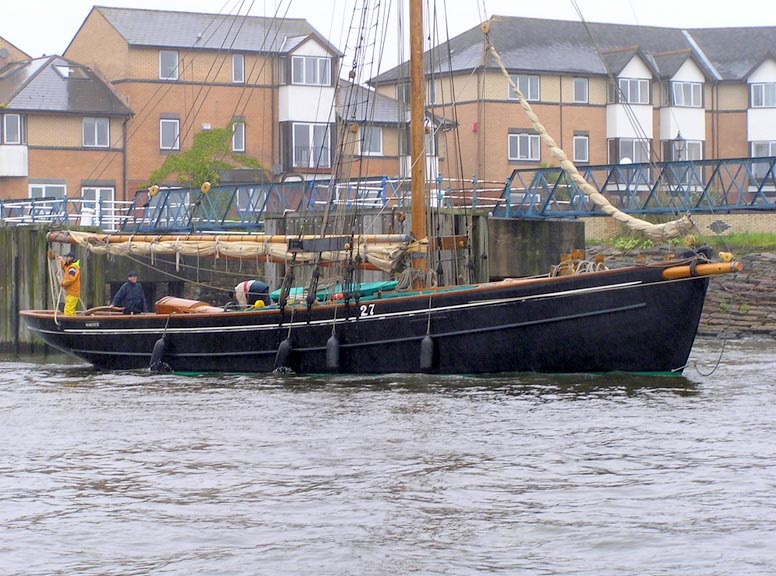
Cariad in Cardiff Bay, 2006

=== Design ===
Bristol Channel pilot cutters are generally seen as the most successful fore and aft rigged boats built during the age of sail. The keys of a good design were:

- Seaworthiness: boats were required to race to ships in the heavy Atlantic Ocean waves of the winter, being able to operate in all weather conditions, whilst keeping the crew safe on the journey.
- Ease of handling: fewer crew and easier handling meant higher profits and a more relaxed working environment in many weather conditions. Typically, apart from the pilot, they were handled by a man and a boy.

=== Development ===
Pilot skiffs had developed for many years, but the earliest records date to 1795 held by Bristol Museum, which lists 12 registered pilot cutters with tonnages raging from 14 to 24 tons. The records of other ports suggest that older surviving cutters ranged in length between 33 feet (10 m) and 40 feet (12 m). The earliest photographs of a cutter are of the boat Trial of Pill-based pilot Thomas Vowles (1847–78), showing a square rig sail that was a common feature on early cutters.

Few period plans or detailed drawings exist and, as the designs developed from boat to boat, the blueprint for the next boat was taken from measuring and the experience of building the last boat, or from half-hull scale models which were then adapted. Hull shapes varied greatly. Transom sterns and square counters were common before 1890. Elliptical counters were introduced in later years. Similarly, some had plumb stems, whilst others were slightly raked. Later-built skiffs included some with rounded stems and cut away forefoots. The lines varied according to local preferences and the opinions of the owner; the only common feature being high bows.

Typical lengths in the 19th century varied between 40 feet (12 m) and 50 feet (15 m) with a 13 feet (4.0 m) beam. The largest built is believed to be Pet, at 53 feet (16 m) long. Typical draft aft was 8 or 9 feet (2.4 or 2.7 m). The usual construction materials were frames of English oak, keel of elm with a keelson of pitch pine. The top strake of planking was oak, then pitch pine to the bilge, which was elm. The planking that then continued down to the keel were either elm or pitch pine. Pitch pine was used for the decks, with the planks laid straight in working-boat fashion, as opposed to the swept deck planking of a yacht of that era. The interior joinery of an ordinary cutter was mostly made of pitch pine, though, more rarely, some used mahogany or teak. All examples were heavily internally ballasted – a few carried additional external ballast of about a ton fastened to the keel.

Welsh boats had low bulwarks. Bristol-built boats had high bulwarks of between 1 foot 6 inches (0.46 m) and 2 feet (0.61 m), with a removable section through which a white-painted clinker-built rowing punt of 13 feet (4.0 m) could easily be put over the side. Punts were painted white to allow them to be seen at night, and traditionally stored on the cutter's port-side.

Speed was profit, and so in summer the sails were made of cotton, and in winter of flax. There were four sets of reefing points, with later designs encompassing roller-reefing, which although bringing its own boat handling advantages, meant that the chances of a broken boom crippling the boat were higher. The size, scale and number of any headsails were a captain's personal choice, but were often used to fool other pilots into thinking that they were being passed by a fishing boat, or as a signature to be recognised by approaching cargo boat captains.

== Pilots ==
Most early pilots were likely to have been local boatmen or fisherman who undertook both jobs, latterly licensed by the local Harbour Master to operate within their jurisdiction from about the 16th century, now authorised by the competent Harbour authority. Pilots in the Bristol channel were until amalgamation self-employed, Bristol Pilots of the Bristol Channel Pilots ltd have always have been self-employed and still are to this day. A quick pilot cutter meant greater success at gaining income. ' No ships, no money !'.

They were based at ports and harbours along the Welsh and English coastlines. Bristol's pilots were actually based at Pill, Somerset, which consequently became a local boat building centre. The relationship between Pill and Bristol was always strained due to the distribution of the locally collected taxes, which was not solved until the passing of the 1807 Bristol Channel Pilotage Act.

Pilots in the Bristol Channel had their own cutters, which were manned by a Westernmen and a boy. The cutters raced westwards to meet the incoming ships in the Western Approaches of the Irish Sea and the Atlantic Ocean. Pilots either owned their own or shared cutters, which were permanently manned by a pilot, western man and a boy, one of whom was often an apprentice pilot . Once a pilot had negotiated a price for pilotage with the master of an inbound vessel, the pilot would board the vessel and the pilot cutter, would follow in the capable hands of the western man and the boy, to be reunited at Hungroad or Kingroad.

Signal flag H (hotel) "Pilot on board"

Signal flag G (Golf) "I require a pilot"

Anecdotal records from Pill suggest that the first official Bristol Channel pilot was barge master George James Ray, appointed by the Corporation of Bristol in May 1497 to pilot John Cabot's Matthew from Bristol harbour to the open sea beyond. However, this is more likely legend as no written records exist. In 1837 Pilot George Ray guided Brunel's SS Great Western, and in 1844 William Ray piloted the larger. SS Great Britain on her maiden voyage. The last channel pilots of the Ray family retired from service 1999.

=== Operations ===
Cutters would leave their home-port in the Channel for the Western Approaches in all weathers, either having been previously contracted by a shipping line to do so, or more frequently as self-employed individuals in competition with other pilots. This was known as 'seeking' for work. Once a pilot had boarded an inward vessel, the skiff or cutter would follow the vessel back to port unless another pilot was carried, in which case they would continue seeking. The inwards pilot had the right to sail the vessel on departure. The inward pilotage by a pilot also granted him first rights to sail the same vessel.

From 1858 whilst in transit, cutters were required by law to display white side lights, but often on the outbound leg these were turned off so as to give a westerly advantage over the competition. Once on station — a situation that could last for a few weeks — the boats were required to display a pilot flag, which in 1849 became the white over red flag still in use today. At night, paraffin (kerosene in U.S. English) flares were required to be fired, with each port they having its own sequence; Bristol's was two shorts and a long.

Once a ship was encountered, whilst the cargo vessel heaved-to the cutter would pull-in on the lee-side. The apprentice would then row the pilot in the punt to the vessel, whilst the captain would sail-clear. The cutter would return once the pilot was on board and the vessel underway. If the cutter had two pilots on board, the sequence would be repeated for a second vessel. If not, she would race home.

Once steam power began to replace sail in cargo vessels some cutters would be towed back in, a practice unpopular with both the vessels' and the cutters' crews.

=== Off duty ===
When not racing into the Western Approaches, cutter captains would take place in port-based "reviews", which were a local mixture of parading and open challenge-based racing. When in windy conditions, cutters would regularly win these open races against professional racing crews, when with full sails on they would reach speeds in excess of 10 knots (19 km/h; 12 mph). Ilfracombe was a popular annual Review, which with its long flat firm sands provided a good place for repairs, as well as a good holiday location for the crew's families during the week.

=== End of sail ===
In 1913, all of the Cardiff pilots were amalgamated into a new company, the Steam Pilot Boat Company (Cardiff and Bristol Channel) Limited. The company, licensed to operate all pilots in the Bristol Channel, had commissioned a series of new steam powered pilot boats which were to be worked out of Barry Docks. The new company did not buy the then in-service sail cutters, which remained owned by their captains. This started the process of many being sold into service as private yachts. The process of amalgamation was stopped during World War I, but due to their design and speed, the last pilot cutters retired in the early 1920s once the new steam and diesel technology had overtaken them in speed and efficiency. Cariad was the last sail-powered pilot cutter to retire in 1922. Bristol pilots amalgamated in 1923 into the Bristol Channel Pilots Ltd., a company which is still operating.

== Mischief ==
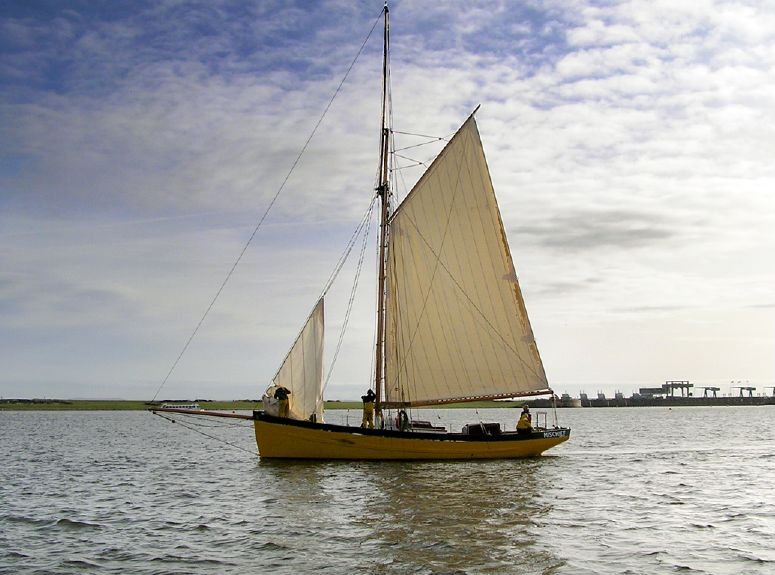
Replica Mischief built by RB Boat Building in 2007, sailing in Cardiff Bay, 2008

Mischief was a 45 feet (14 m) Bristol Channel pilot cutter built by Thomas Baker of Cardiff in 1906. She was commissioned and sailed by pilot William “Billy the Mischief” Morgan, who once sailed her into Ilfracombe harbour in such appalling weather that he and his boat earned great respect from the local pilots for "a first class piece of seamanship."

After being sold in 1921, she was owned by various commercial owners and then ended up in Valletta, Malta, where in 1954 the mountaineer and explorer Bill Tilman purchased her. After a refit, he sailed her over 110,000 miles (180,000 km), from the Antarctic to the Arctic, including stops in Patagonia, Greenland, South Georgia and Heard Island. Tilman wrote six books during his adventures in Mischief, until in 1968 she hit a rock off Jan Mayen Island in the Arctic Ocean, and then began to sink before being crushed by ice.

Tilman continued his adventures in two other Bristol Channel pilot cutters, Sea Breeze and Baroque. Invited in his 80th year in 1977 to work as expert crew aboard the Simon Richardson skippered En Avant with mountaineers sailing to climb Smith Island, the ship disappeared with all hands whilst en route between Rio de Janeiro and the Falkland Islands.

In 2007 a new Mischief was commissioned and built by RB Boat Building.

== Preservation ==
Today only 18 original cutters are believed to survive from the hundreds built. Some are available for private charter, whilst many attend maritime rallies and occasionally join the Barry Yacht Club's annual Cock of the Bristol Channel race:

Name	Date	Builder	Original Owner	Length	Beam	Draft	Displacement	Current Location	Notes	Website
Alpha	1904	William Stober, Fleetwood	William Prosser	52 feet (16 m)	14.6 feet (4.5 m)	8.5 feet (2.6 m)	36 tonnes (35 long tons; 40 short tons)	Shuna Island, Scotland	Privately owned	
Baroque	1902	J Hambly, Cardiff		50.2 feet (15.3 m)	13.5 feet (4.1 m)	8.5 feet (2.6 m)	32 tonnes (31 long tons; 35 short tons)	Stockholm, Sweden	Privately owned	
Breeze	1887	J.Cooper, Pill		38 feet (12 m)	12 feet (3.7 m)			Somerset	Privately owned	
Cariad	1904	Edwin "Cracker" Rowles, Pill	Thomas Richards, Cardiff	47 feet (14 m)	12.75 feet (3.89 m)	7.5 feet (2.3 m)	30 tonnes (30 long tons; 33 short tons)	Dartmouth, Devon	Cariad (Welsh language for Loved One) was by 1922 the last working sail-powered pilot cutter. Bought by Frank Carr as his private yacht, she featured in his 1936 book A Yachtsman's Log. Preserved in 1972 at the Exeter Maritime Museum, after its dissolution she was resold into private ownership. Relaunched in 2006 after an extensive refit. Sailed by Tom Cunliffe in the fifth episode of Boats that Built Britain.	
Carlotta	1899	WH Halford, Gloucester		50 feet (15 m)	13 feet (4.0 m)	8 feet (2.4 m)	28 tonnes (28 long tons; 31 short tons)	British Columbia, Canada	Originally launched as The Solway, where in Maryport and Whitehaven, Cumbria she acted as the fisheries police boat. Sold in 1907, she has since operated as a private yacht. Privately owned	
Cornubia	1911	J Slade & Sons, Fowey	Morrice, Barry	52 feet (16 m)	13.7 feet (4.2 m)	7.3 feet (2.2 m)	30 tonnes (30 long tons; 33 short tons)	Plymouth, Devon	After being sold in 1917, she was renamed Hirta after an island owned by her owner. Most famous as being owned by Tom Cunliffe, who cruised her extensively including visits to Greenland and the United States. Cunliffe sold her, after which she was extensively refitted, and now contains only 11 original timbers.	
Dolphin	1909	J.Bowden, Porthleven		38.8 feet (11.8 m)	11.5 feet (3.5 m)	7.5 feet (2.3 m)	19 tonnes (19 long tons; 21 short tons)	Northern Europe	The only surviving cutter with a transom stern, apart from Breeze which originally had a counter stern. Privately owned	
Frolic	1905	J.Westmacott, Bideford	Alf Edwards, Cardiff	55 feet (17 m)	13.4 feet (4.1 m)	8.7 feet (2.7 m)	35 tonnes (34 long tons; 39 short tons)	Norway	The only surviving cutter with a transom stern, apart from Breeze which originally had a counter stern. Privately owned	
Kindly Light	1911	Armour Brothers, Fleetwood	Lewis Alexander, Barry	53.97 feet (16.45 m)	14.49 feet (4.42 m)	8.49 feet (2.59 m)	20 tonnes (20 long tons; 22 short tons)	Gweek, Cornwall	New pilot Lewis Alexander of Barry commissioned Armour Brothers of Fleetwood to build a pilot cutter for him because William Stoba, the foreman shipwright who had designed ALPHA, the highly successful Newport pilot cutter of 1904, worked for them. Launched in 1911, at £500 she cost 40% more than the standard price for a cutter. After being laid-up during WWI, she was considered the fastest of 100 cutters still working post-war. Privately preserved, she is on the register of National Historic Ships.	
Letty	1905	E.Rowles, Pill		52.5 feet (16.0 m)	13.5 feet (4.1 m)	8.5 feet (2.6 m)		Cornwall		
Madcap	1875	Davies & Plain, Cardiff		43.2 feet (13.2 m)	12.3 feet (3.7 m)	7.5 feet (2.3 m)	22 tonnes (22 long tons; 24 short tons)	Belfast, Northern Ireland	Sold in 2014 to a French consortium and overhauled in La Rochelle.	
Marguerite	1893	E.Rowles, Pill	Frank Trott	53 feet (16 m)	13 feet 10 inches (4.22 m)	8.3 feet (2.5 m)	35 tonnes (34 long tons; 39 short tons)	River Fal, Cornwall	Built for Frank Trott, he had her fitted with a tug's towing hook to the fore side after steam-powered cargo ship became common, to allow them to tow Marguerite back into port.	
Marian	1889	J Hambly, Cardiff		50 feet (15 m)	12.9 feet (3.9 m)	7.8 feet (2.4 m)	28 tonnes (28 long tons; 31 short tons)	Cornwall		
Mascotte	1904	Thomas Cox, Newport		60 feet (18 m)	15 feet (4.6 m)	9.5 feet (2.9 m)	44 tonnes (43 long tons; 49 short tons)	Charlestown, Cornwall	Privately owned, largest of the surviving boats	
Olga	1909	J.Bowden, Porthleven		56 feet (17 m)	13.6 feet (4.1 m)	8.6 feet (2.6 m)	32 tonnes (31 long tons; 35 short tons)	Swansea Museum	Preserved at the Swansea Museum	
Peggy	1904	E.Rowles, Pill	Richard Arthur Case	45 feet (14 m)	12.5 feet (3.8 m)	7 feet 6 inches (2.29 m)	23 tonnes (23 long tons; 25 short tons)	Bristol Harbour	Originally named Wave, she carried the No.10 on her mainsail. Converted to a yacht in 1920s by Moody's, reregistered asPeggy in London. Owned since 2018 by Mr John Potter formerly owned by Mr. Diccon Pridie. Used as the blueprint for the replica-boat Polly Agatha built by Cockwells.	
Raider	1910	Kitto, Porthleven	George Bennett, Barry	48 feet (15 m)	14 feet (4.3 m)	8.5 feet (2.6 m)	30 tonnes (30 long tons; 33 short tons)	Vineyard Haven, Massachusetts	Named after George Bennett's daughter, she was converted into a yacht in the early 1920s	
Clarice (ex-Vivacious)	1910	J.Slade & Sons, Polruan		48 feet (15 m)	13.25 feet (4.04 m)	7.2 feet (2.2 m)	27 tonnes (27 long tons; 30 short tons)	South of France		

=== Replica ===
There are an increasing number of replica boats, often built for the private hire and charter market.
