= Frank George Griffith Carr =

Frank George Griffith Carr CB, CBE, FSA, MA, LLB

Director of the National Maritime Museum
- In office 1947–1966
- Preceded by: Geoffrey Callender

Assistant Librarian at the House of Lords Library
- In office 1929–1947

Personal details
- Born: 23 April 1903
- Died: 9 July 1991 (aged 88)
- Spouse: Ruth Carr

Military service
- Branch/service: Royal Naval Volunteer Reserve; Secret Intelligence Service
- Rank: Lieutenant Commander
- Battles/wars: World War II; Operation Wilfred; German occupation of Norway; Shetland bus; Battles of Narvik; Continuation War; Cold War

Frank George Griffith Carr (23 April 1903 – 9 July 1991) CB, CBE, FSA, MA, LLB, was a British sailor and intelligence officer who during World War II became involved with Section D of the Secret Intelligence Service (MI6 or SIS). In the earlier part of the war, having co-founded "The Cruising Club", with August Courtauld and Gerard Holdsworth, he worked along the coasts of Norway, Denmark, Holland, and Belgium on survey finding missions for Allied landing and launch sites. He then used his surveys to create seaborne smuggling lines into Norway, becoming one of the progenitors of the Shetland bus. When Section D was absorbed into the Special Operations Executive (SOE) in the summer of 1940, Carr went on to serve in various SIS missions on deployments into Finland and Sweden. By the end of the war, he had earned the rank of Lieutenant Commander in the Royal Naval Volunteer Reserve.

After the war, he became the director of the National Maritime Museum, Greenwich, England from 1947 to 1966 and was responsible for restoring and preserving a large number of ships, such as the Cutty Sark and the Gypsy Moth IV. After retirement he was involved in the creation of the Maritime Trust and the World Ship Trust which served the purpose of preserving old ships.

== Life ==
Frank Carr fell in love with sailing barges as a boy of 10. He acquired his first boat, a skiff-dinghy, in 1918. He used this vessel, the Maud, to explore the broads, fens and estuaries of East Anglia.

He was educated at The Perse School and Trinity Hall, Cambridge. While he was studying for his law degree at Cambridge, his first job was on a barge travelling between Ipswich and Antwerp in 1928. On graduation, he became assistant librarian at the House of Lords Library. He began research for his first book, Sailing Barges, published in 1931.

He continued sailing and his book A Yachtsman's log tells of the voyages made to the Baltic, Spain, and the British coastline in his Bristol Channel Pilot Cutter Cariad.

After serving in the RNVR during the Second World War, he was appointed director of the National Maritime Museum in 1946 where he supervised and oversaw its growth while also incorporating a number of other historic parts of Greenwich. He resigned from the museum in 1966 in controversial circumstances.

He served on the council of the Society for Nautical Research and was made its Honorary Vice-president.

He was a founder and chairman of the World Ship Trust (1978) and largely responsible for the survival of the Cutty Sark.

Carr was awarded the CBE (1954) and was made a CB (1967).

He died 9 July 1991.

== Publications ==
- Sailing Barges (1931, 5th edition 1989)
- Vanishing craft (1934)
- A Yachtsman's log (1935)
- Yacht master’s guide and coastal companion (1940)
- The Cutty Sark and the days of sail (c1962)
- Maritime Greenwich (1974)
- Gypsy Moth IV (c1981)
