= Lugger =

Type of sailing vessel

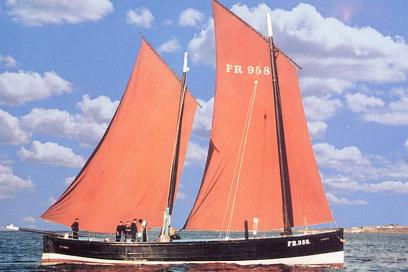
Reaper, a Fifie, a type of sailing drifter built in the Northeast of Scotland

Sailing fifie

A lugger is a sailing vessel defined by its rig, using the lug sail on all of its one or more masts. Luggers were widely used as working craft, particularly off the coasts of France, England, Ireland and Scotland. Luggers varied extensively in size and design. Many were undecked, open boats, some of which operated from beach landings (such as Hastings or Deal). Others were fully decked craft (typified by the Zulu and many other sailing drifters). Some larger examples might carry lug topsails.

== History ==
A lugger is usually a two- or three-masted vessel, setting lug sails on each mast. (Note: There are some single-masted lug-rigged craft that are referred to as luggers, including the New Orleans Lugger (or Oyster Lugger).) A jib or staysail may be set on some luggers. More rarely, lug topsails are used by some luggers — notably the chasse-marée. A lug sail is an asymmetric quadrilateral sail that fastens to a yard (spar) along the head (top edge) of the sail. The yard is held to the mast either by a parrel or by a traveller (consisting of a metal ring that goes round the mast and has an eye for the halyard and a hook which fastens to a strop on the yard). A dipping lug sail is fastened at the tack (front lower corner) some distance in front of the mast, often at the stemhead. A standing lug's tack is fastened near the foot of the mast. The halyard for a dipping lug is usually made fast to the weather gunwale, thereby allowing the mast to be otherwise unstayed. A common arrangement is to have a dipping lug foresail and a standing lug mizzen. (Note: Because two-masted traditional British luggers were often derived from earlier three-masted versions, the forward mast on these two-masted vessels was called the foremast and the after mast the mizzen, the main mast having been dispensed with.) This arrangement is found on many traditional British fishing vessels, such as the fifie, but there are examples of dipping lugs on two masts or standing lugs on two or three masts (as in the chasse-marée).

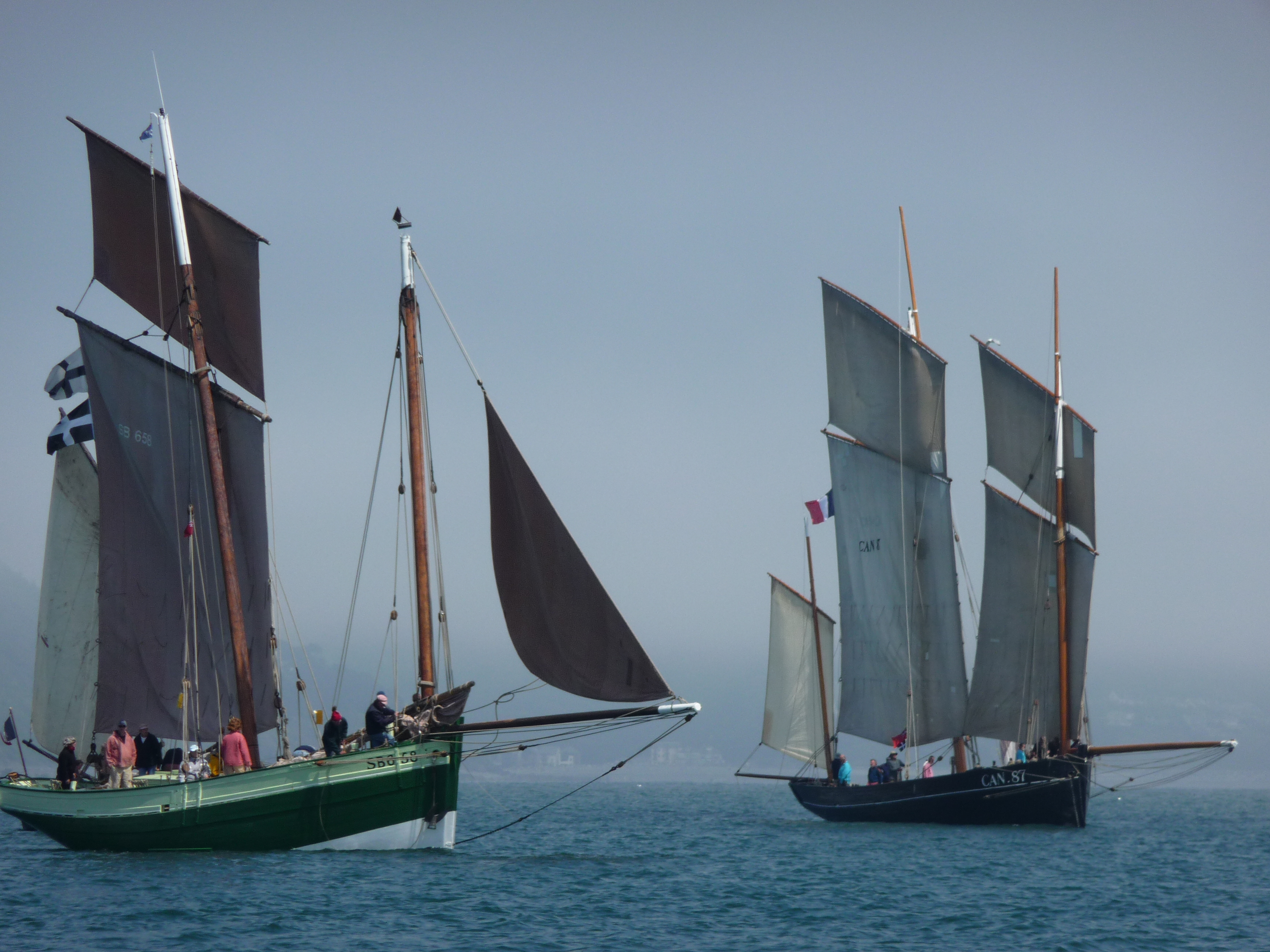
Luggers at Looe Bay, showing use of jib and topsails

== Rig ==
A standing lug may be used with or without a boom; most working craft were boomless to allow more working space. The dipping lug never uses a boom. A dipping lug has to be moved to the leeward side of the mast when going about, so that the sail can take a good aerodynamic shape on the new tack. There are several methods of doing this, one of which is to simply lower the sail, manhandle the yard and sail to the other side of the mast and re-hoist. All the various methods are time and labour consuming. A standing lug can be left unaltered when tacking as it still sets reasonably well with the sail pressed against the mast. Some users (such as in the Royal Navy Montagu whaler) would still dip the yard of a standing lug (with a sharp, well timed downward pull on the leech at the moment when the wind is not filling the sail). Conversely many fishermen would always hoist a standing lug on the same side of the mast regardless of which tack they expected to be sailing on.

== Performance ==
Sailing performance with a standing lug relies on the right amount of luff tension. An essential component of this rig is the tack tackle, a purchase with which luff tension is adjusted for various points of sail.

The balanced (or balance) lug has a boom that projects in front of the mast roughly the same distance as the yard. This is generally used in dinghies. The sail is left on the same side of the mast regardless of the wind direction. A downhaul is set up from the boom to a point close to the heel of the mast and its adjustment is critical to getting this sort of sail to set correctly. Luggers were used extensively for smuggling from the middle of the 18th century onwards; their fast hulls and powerful rigs regularly allowed them to outpace any Revenue vessel in service. The French three-masted luggers also served as privateers and in general trade. As smuggling declined from about 1840, the mainmast of British three-masted luggers tended to be discarded, with larger sails being set on the fore and mizzen. This gave more clear space in which to work fishing nets.

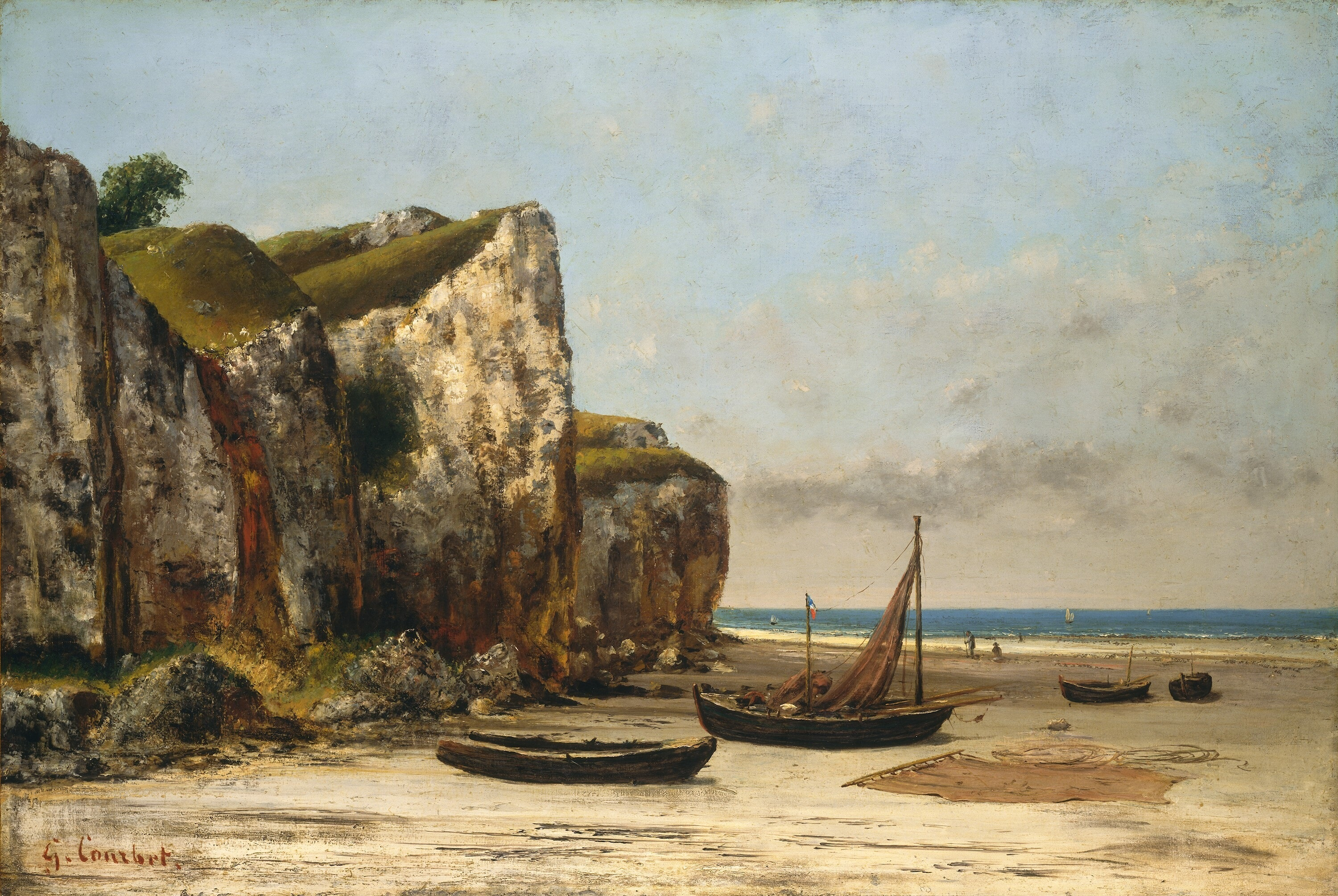
A French lugger, beached and drying nets. The lugsail is spread on the beach. Painted by Gustave Courbet around 1874.

== Local types ==
British Isles

- Coble, used on the English east coast from Yorkshire to Northumberland
- Five Man boats, large 55–65 foot boats used for line fishing on the Yorkshire coast
- Cornish lugger
- Deal lugger, the two larger types of boat used by Deal boatmen to service ships anchored in the Downs. These were beach-launched open boats, originally three masted, but the main-mast was later dispensed with to allow more room, ultimately giving jib, dipping lug foresail and a standing lug mizzen sheeted to an outrigger. A first-class lugger or "fore-peaker" was typically 38 feet long, 12 ft 3 inches at greatest beam, carried 6 tons of ballast in a clinker-built hull weighing 3.5 tons. They could carry a replacement anchor and cable out to a large ship – a load of at least six tons.
- Fifie, a herring drifter of the Scottish east coast
- Hastings lugger
- Manx nickey
- Manx nobby
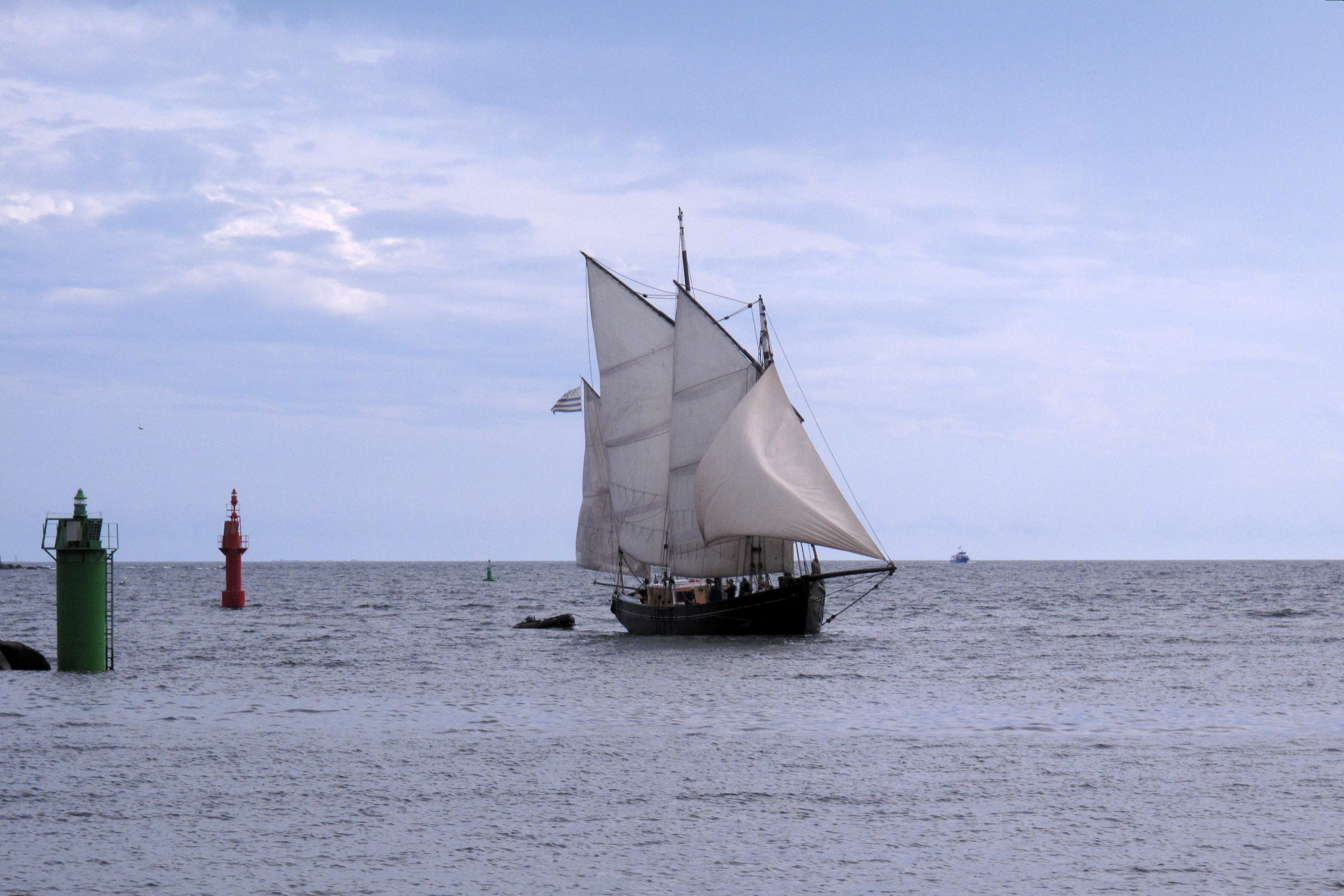
  Corentin, a replica chasse-marée
- Sgoth Niseach, dipping lug

Continental Europe

- Barca-longa, of the Iberian and Mediterranean coasts
- Breton chasse-marée. These were fast-sailing cargo vessels that took fresh fish to market, sometimes taking general cargo for the return trip. They set standing lugs on three masts and a jib. Topsails were often used and topgallants when racing.
- French lugger (lougre), of the coast of Normandy

United States of America

- New Orleans Lugger
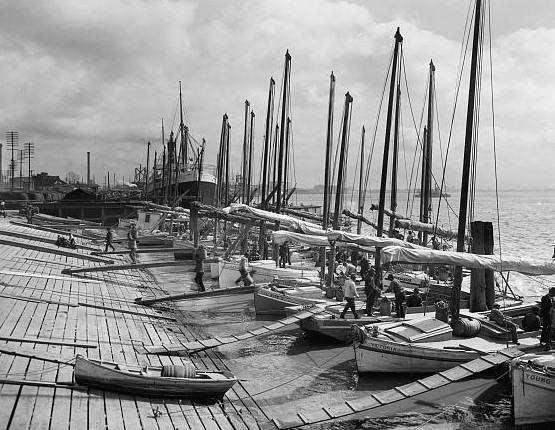
  Oyster Luggers in New Orleans
  (also known as an Oyster Lugger). These shallow draft vessels were typically 37 ft overall with a 12 ft beam, although they could vary substantially in size. They set a dipping lug on a single mast and had a centre board to help go to windward in deeper waters. They were used principally for fishing, with some cargoes occasionally carried. They could be found from Texas to the West coast of Florida.

Australia

- Some of the early pearling luggers used off the northern coast line of Australia from about the 1870s, often ship's boats, carried a lug sail, but the purpose-built boats that were used from the 1880s stopped using it over time. The majority of these were gaff-riged ketches, although they continued to be called pearling luggers until the present day.

== See also ==
- Mystery, lugger
- Spirit of Mystery, replica of the lugger Mystery
- Sophie Theresia (herring lugger)
- Leopold Janikowski sailed in a lugger to Cameroon in 1882
