= Reaper (sailing vessel) =

Restored Fifie fishing boat

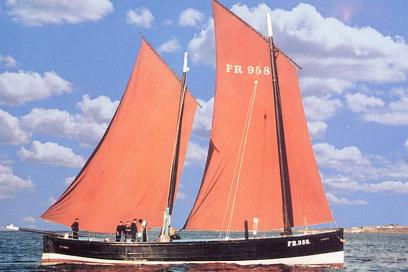
- The Reaper under full sail.

History

United Kingdom
- Builder: J. & G. Forbes of Sandhaven
- Launched: 1901
- Identification: MMSI number: 235078068; Callsign: MRYH4
- Status: Museum ship

General characteristics
- Class & type: Fifie herring drifter
- Tonnage: Gross: 61.30 (net 29.04)
- Length: 70.26 ft (21.42 m)
- Beam: 20.38 ft (6.21 m)
- Draft: 8.60 ft (2.62 m)
- Sail plan: Height of mizzen mast: 46.82 ft (14.27 m); Sail area (foresail): 1,557.5 sq ft (144.70 m^{2}); Sail area (mizzen): 1,130.2 sq ft (105.00 m^{2})

Reaper is a restored historic Fifie herring drifter which is registered by the National Historic Ships Committee as part of the National Historic Fleet of the UK, and currently operates as a museum ship.

== History ==
Built by J. & G. Forbes of Sandhaven in 1901, she is 21 metres long and of carvel construction, using larch planking on larch and oak frames. First registered at Fraserburgh in 1902, she operated initially as a sailing lugger with a main dipping lug sail and a mizzen standing lug sail. There would have been a crew of around eight to work the nets which were set at dusk and hauled in at dawn. Once the haul was complete, a swift return to port would ensure the best prices for the earliest-sold catches.

Reaper later spent many years in Shetland fishing for herring in the summer and she was fitted with an engine between the Wars. During World War II she was requisitioned by the Admiralty and served in the southeast of England, often being used as a barrage balloon mooring. After the war, she resumed fishing in Shetland and continued until 1957. She holds the record catch for Shetland of 233 cran (almost 250,000 herrings).

From 1959 she served the local council as a general purpose cargo boat until the introduction of the roll on-roll off ferries when she was retired from service.

== Reaper today ==
Reaper was purchased by the Scottish Fisheries Museum in Anstruther, Fife in 1975 and restored to her traditional sailing configuration as a two-masted sailing lugger, much as she would have appeared when first going to sea in 1902. Renamed Reaper FR958, she is one of the last authentic survivors of this type of vessel, once plentiful on the east coast of Scotland.

Listed as part of the National Historic Fleet, she sails regularly in the summer months. When not sailing, the boat is berthed in Anstruther harbour opposite the fisheries museum. In 2003 she visited 14 ports around Britain, attracting 24,000 visitors. In 2005 she visited 12 ports around Britain, including a visit to the Festival of the Sea in Portsmouth, and attracted 20,000 visitors.

In 2001, with seven people aboard, she was the centre of an emergency off the coast of northeast England when she began to take on water due to the failure of a bilge pump. A rescue helicopter was scrambled from RAF Boulmer in Northumberland. A lifeboat dispatched from Amble transferred a new pump and escorted her to harbour for repairs.

In August 2016 she was blown over and partially submerged in unseasonably strong winds while docked at Johnshaven Harbor in Aberdeenshire.

== Gallery ==
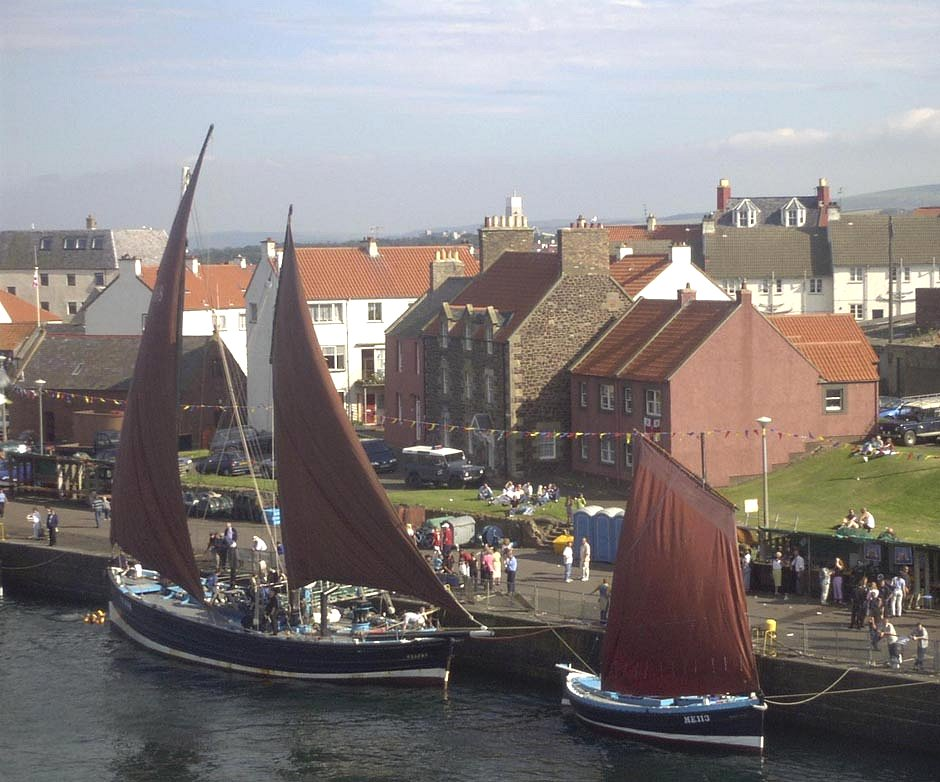
The Reaper on a visit to Dunbar Harbour.

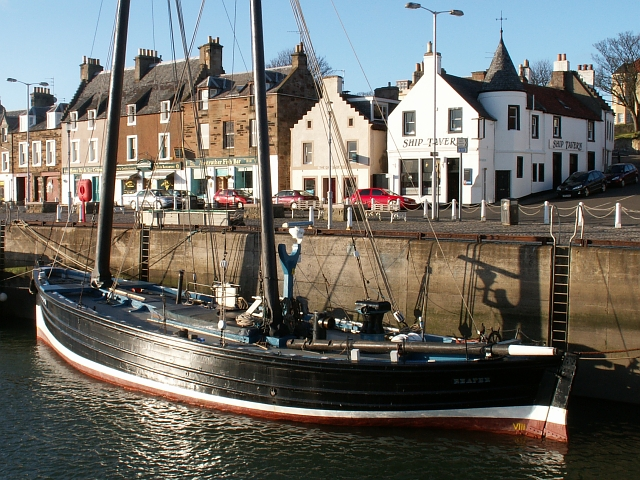
The Reaper berthed in Anstruther harbour.

== Media ==
Reaper was portrayed in an episode of the 2010 BBC TV series Boats that Built Britain.
