= Tom Cunliffe =

British yachting journalist, author, broadcaster (b. 1947)

- Born: 1947 (age 77–78)
- Occupations: Yachting journalist; author; broadcaster
- Spouse: Ros

YouTube information
- Channel: Tom Cunliffe – Yachts and Yarns
- Website: tomcunliffe.com

Tom Cunliffe (born 1947) is a British yachting journalist, author and broadcaster.

== Biography ==
Cunliffe learnt how to sail in a 22 ft gaff sloop as a teenager on the Norfolk Broads. After studying law at university, he chose not to enter the profession and effectively ran away to sea instead. He has worked as mate on a coasting merchant vessel and skippered private yachts as well as having been a delivery and charter skipper. He was a sailing tutor for many years, progressing from running a dinghy sailing school in the south of France to becoming a senior offshore instructor at the British National Sailing Centre in Cowes. He has been a qualified yachtmaster examiner since 1978. His many cruises in his own yachts span the Atlantic from the Arctic to the South Atlantic, east to west as far as you can go. He and his wife are keen motorcyclists and have crossed the American continent in both directions, each riding their own machines.

== Career as journalist, author and broadcaster ==
Cunliffe has been a regular contributor to Yachting Monthly, Yachting World, Sail magazine,Classic Boat and 'Sailing Today' for many years.

A professional writer since 1986, Cunliffe has won the Best Book of the Sea award twice, for Topsail and Battleaxe and Hand, Reef and Steer. He is author of the important Shell Channel Pilot for the English Channel.

In 2010 he presented the award-winning six-part BBC documentary series, The Boats that Built Britain. He also presented the popular 'Boat Yard' series for Discovery TV. In October 2025, his YouTube channel, Yachts and Yarns, had 40,900 subscribers.

== Personal life ==
When not sailing his 44 ft cutter Constance, Cunliffe lives in the New Forest with his wife Ros where he rides a large motorcycle, grows roses, and drives a 1949 Bentley.

== Selected bibliography ==
- In the Wake of Heroes, 2015, Adlard Coles Nautical
- Sailing, Yachts and Yarns, 2011, John Wiley & Sons
- The Complete Yachtmaster (7th edition), 2010, Adlard Coles Nautical
- Yachting Monthly 200 Skipper's Tips, 2010, John Wiley & Sons
- The Complete Day Skipper (3rd edition), 2009, Adlard Coles Nautical
- Good Vibrations: Coast to Coast by Harley, 2000, Summersdale
- Hand, Reef and Steer, 1992, Thomas Reed Publications
- Topsail and Battleaxe, 1988, David & Charles
- Celestial Navigation, 1989, Fernhurst Books
