= Scottish Fisheries Museum =

Fishing museum in Fife, Scotland

Coordinates: 56.2219°N 2.6968°W

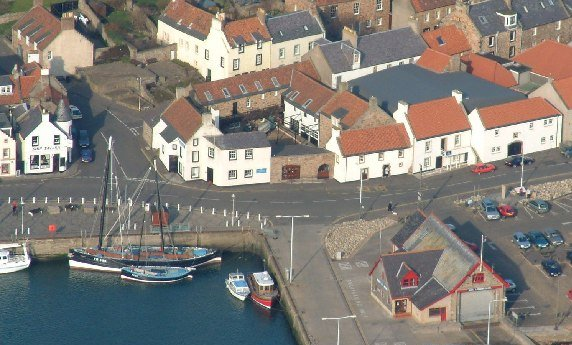
Aerial view of the museum complex, with the twin masted Reaper seen berthed in the harbour to the left.

The Scottish Fisheries Museum is a museum in Anstruther, Fife, that records the history of the Scottish fishing industry and its people from earliest times to the present day.

Opened in 1969, the museum is situated on the harbour front in Anstruther, in the heart of the East Neuk crab and lobster fishing villages of St Monans, Pittenweem, Cellardyke and Crail. It has grown over time into a sizable complex, occupying a number of converted buildings set around three sides of a cobbled courtyard. These include two Category 'A' listed buildings: the 16th century Abbot's lodging and an 18th-century merchant's house, both of which have historical associations with the fishing life of the village.

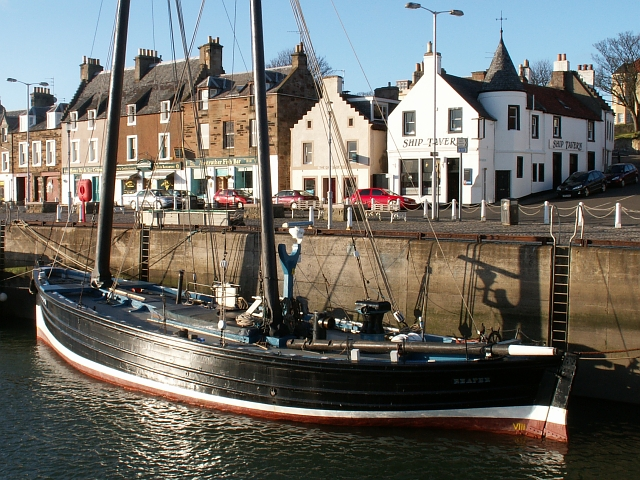
The Reaper berthed in Anstruther harbour.

The museum collection contains many model boats, fishing gear, a significant historical photographic archive and paintings. In addition to the traditional exhibits, the museum also boasts a collection of 18 boats, the pride of which is the 104-year-old twin masted Fifie herring drifter, Reaper. This vessel was restored by the museum's boat club and sails regularly in the summer months. Between 2003 and 2005 she visited 26 ports around Britain, including a visit to the Festival of the Sea in Portsmouth, attracting 44,000 visitors. When not sailing, the boat is berthed in Anstruther harbour opposite the museum.

In total, the collection comprises over 66,000 items. In 2007, the museum was one of the first in Scotland to have its entire collection awarded Recognised Collection status by Museums Galleries Scotland (previously the Scottish Museum Council), designating it as being of national or international importance. The museum also incorporates a small private chapel, which commemorates the Scots who perished at sea while fishing.

== See also ==
- Fishing industry in Scotland
