= Ringtail (sail) =

A ringtail a sail which is set abaft (behind) a fore-and-aft sail to increase the total sail area of a sailing vessel in light winds. It may be three or four-sided.

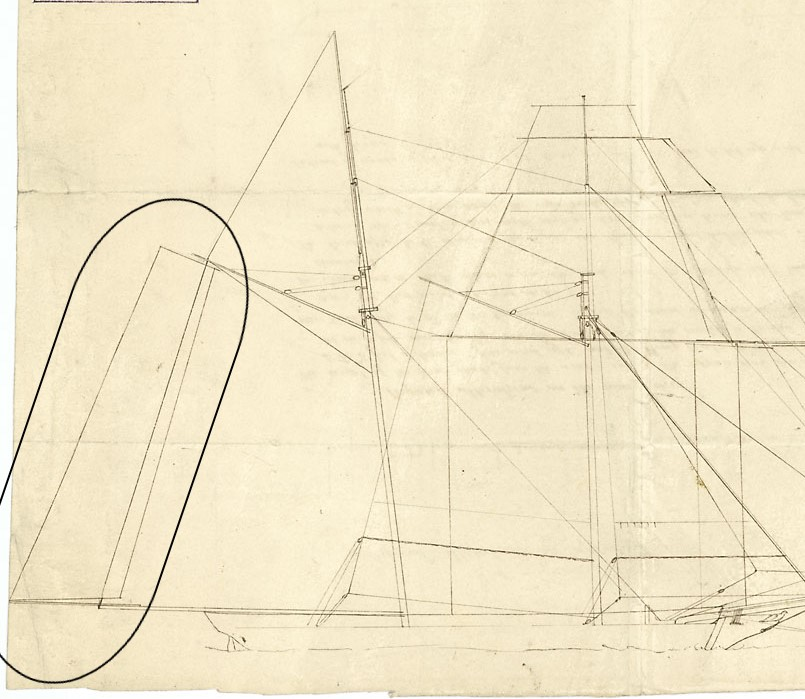
An extract from an 1835 sail plan of a British schooner. The ringtail is circled for identification.

== Description ==
A ringtail sail may be quadrilateral or triangular in shape.

=== Quadrilateral ===
The older and more common type is a quadrilateral sail set on spars which extend the gaff and boom of a gaff sail. The effect is as if the gaff sail were larger in size, with the extra sail cloth of the ringtail continuing the plane in which the gaff sail is set.

=== Triangular ===
The triangular ringtail is set both above and behind a triangular working sail on the mizzen mast, providing extra sail area with minimal crew input, typically on late 19th-century schooners on the American West Coast. The head of the ringtail is hoisted to the top of the topmast, and the clew is sheeted down to the end of the boom of the working sail. The luff runs parallel to the topmast, to which it is usually laced. The foot approximately follows the line of the luff of the working sail with which it is set.
