= Fifie =

Sailing boat

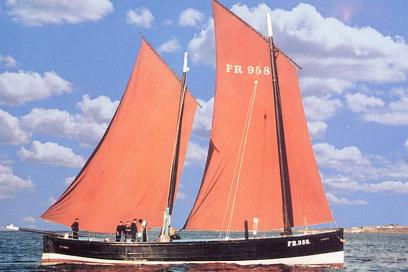
The Reaper under full sail.

The Fifie is a design of sailing boat developed on the east coast of Scotland. It was a traditional fishing boat used by Scottish fishermen from the 1850s until well into the 20th century. These boats were mainly used to fish for herring using drift nets, and along with other designs of boat were known as herring drifters.

== Design ==
While the boats varied in design, they can be categorised by their vertical stem and stern, their long straight keel and wide beam. These attributes made the Fifies very stable in the water and allowed them to carry a very large set of sails. The long keel, however, made them difficult to manoeuvre in small harbours.

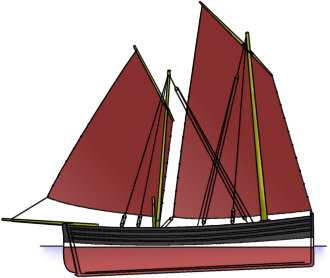
A sailing Fifie, showing the main dipping lug and the mizzen standing lug.

Sailing Fifies had two masts with the standard rig consisting of a main dipping lug sail and a mizzen standing lug sail. The masts were positioned far forward and aft on the boat to give the maximum clear working space amidships. A large fifie could reach just over 20 metres (66 ft) in length. Because of their large sail area they were very fast sailing boats.

Fifies built after 1860 were all decked and from the 1870s onwards the bigger boats were built with carvel planking, i.e. the planks were laid edge to edge instead of the overlapping clinker style of previous boats. The introduction of steam powered capstans in the 1890s, to help raising the lugs sails, allowed the size of these vessels to increase from 30 feet (9.14 m) to over 70 feet (21.34 m) in length. From about 1905 onwards sailing Fifies were gradually fitted with engines and converted to motorised vessels.

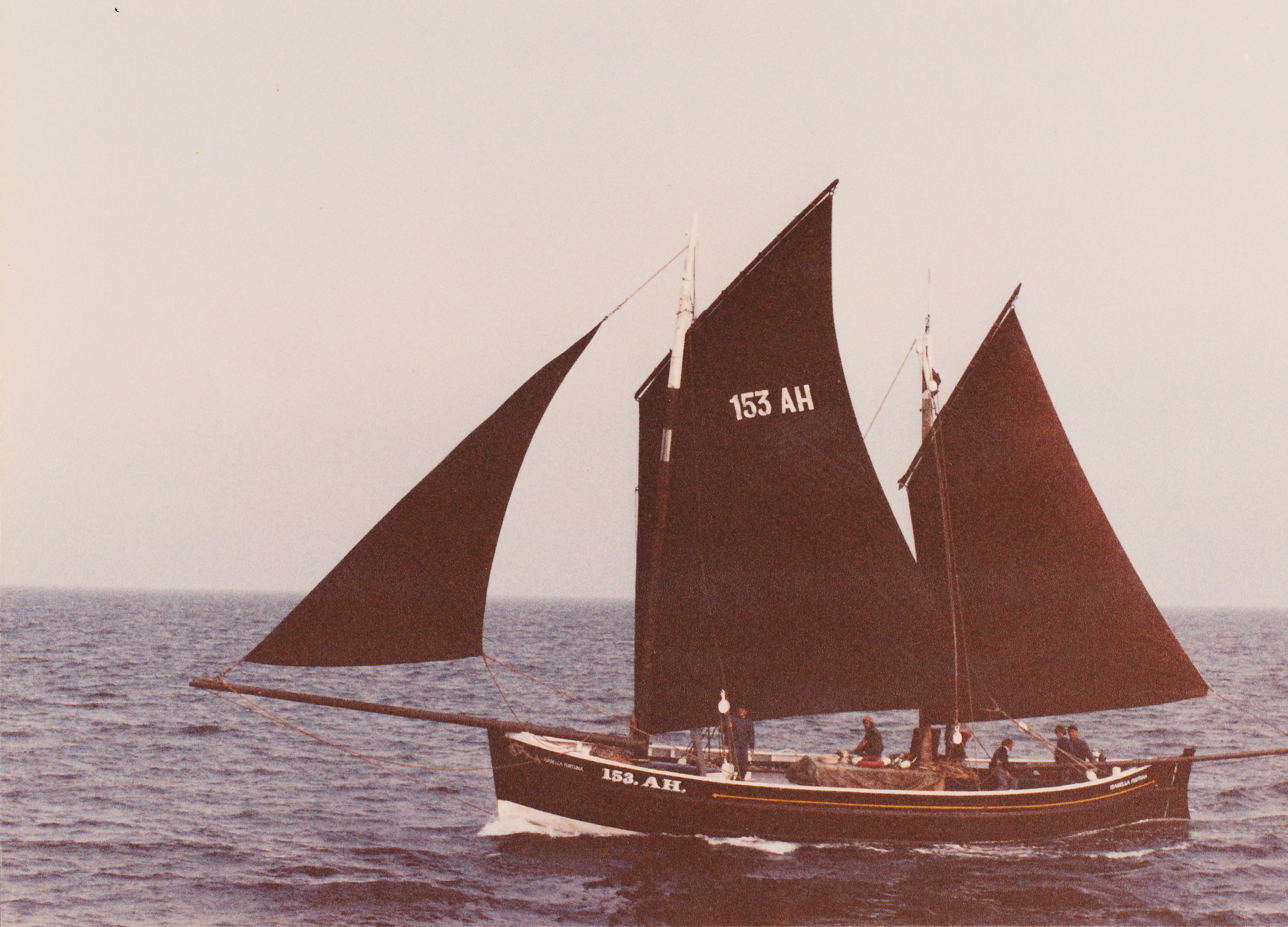
Isabella Fortuna 830820

There are few surviving examples of this type of fishing boat still in existence. The Scottish Fisheries Museum based in Anstruther, Fife has restored and still sails a classic example of this type of vessel named the Reaper. The Swan Trust in Lerwick, Shetland have restored and maintain another Fifie, The Swan, as a sail training vessel. She now takes over 1000 trainees each year, and has taken trainees to participate in the Cutty Sark Tall Ships Races to ports in France, Denmark, the Netherlands, Ireland as well as around the UK. The Isabella Fortuna is owned by the Wick Society.

== Gallery ==
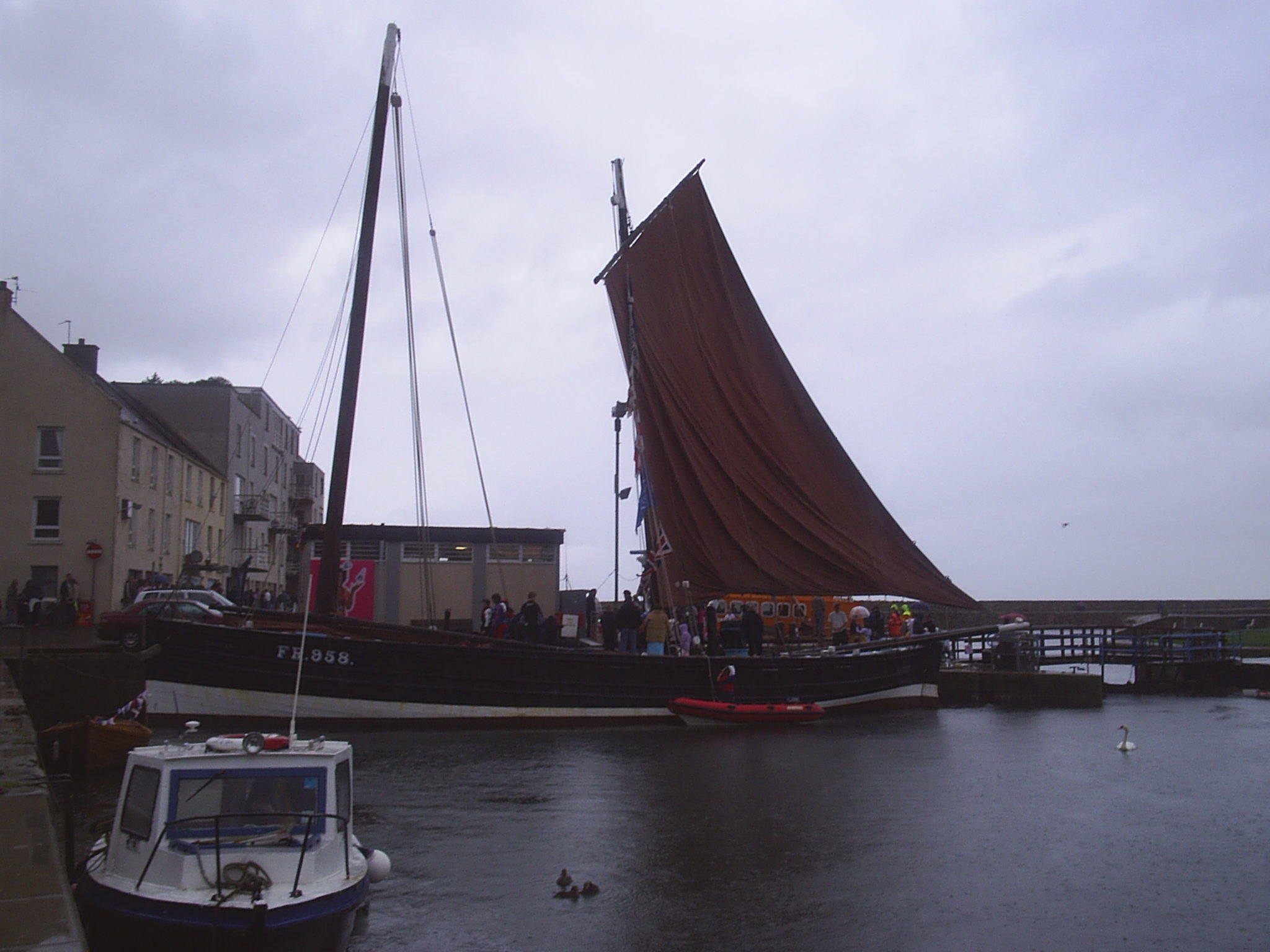
The restored sailing Fifie, Reaper visiting St Andrews in Fife.

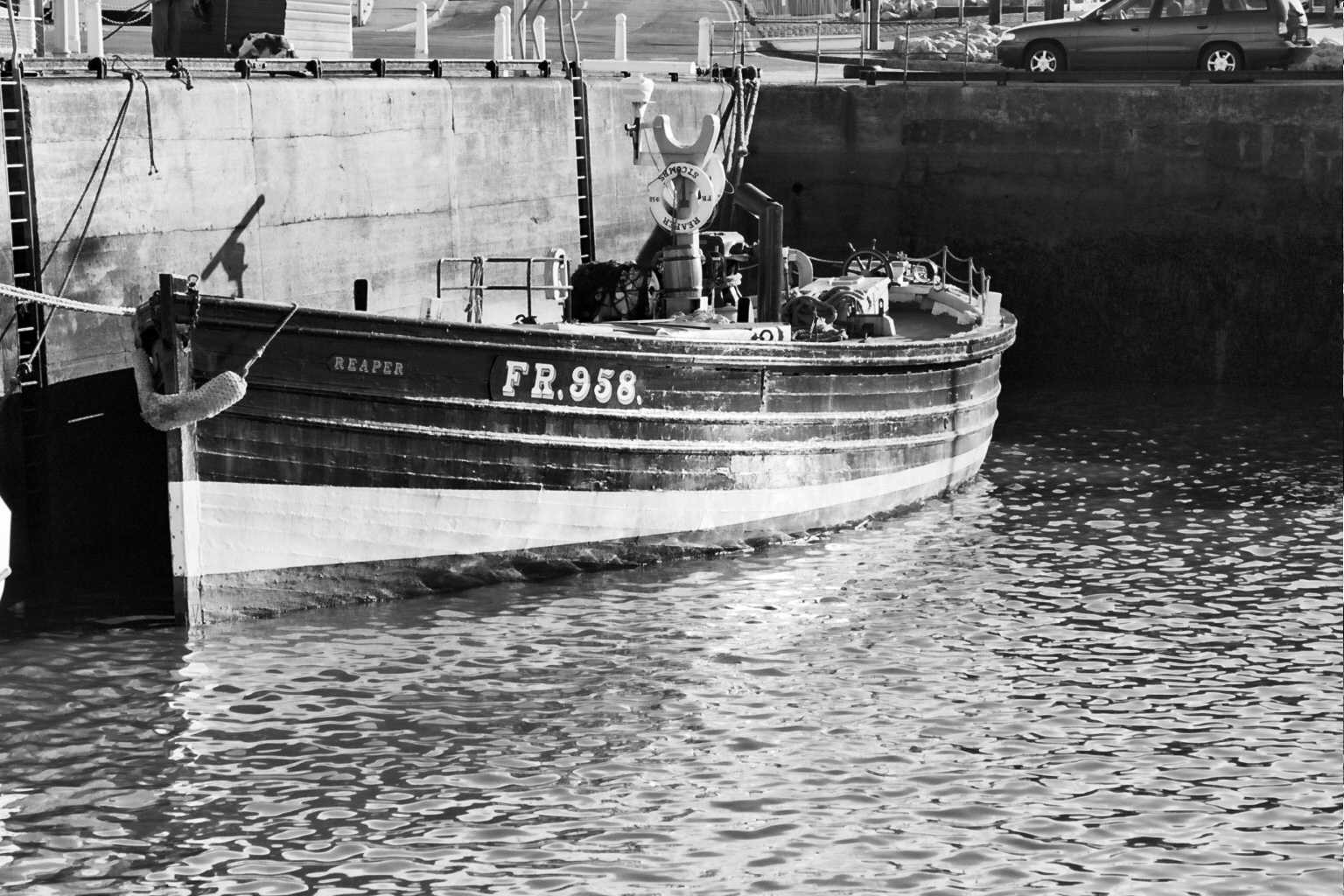
Reaper in her home port of Anstruther
