= Heritage fleet (disambiguation) =

A "Heritage fleet" is a collection of historic vehicles or vessels.

Heritage Fleet may also refer to:

- Heritage Fleet, a type of rolling stock operated by Amtrak, the American railroad company
- Union Pacific Heritage Fleet, a fleet of historic steam and diesel locomotives operated by the Union Pacific Railroad in USA
- The Heritage Fleet, a British company operating preserved buses
- Norfolk Heritage Fleet Trust, a maritime charity based in Norfolk, England
- Sydney Heritage Fleet, sailing vessels and maritime museum in Sydney, Australia
- Classes 100 to 131 of the List of British Rail diesel multiple unit classes in the fleet numbering scheme of the former nationalised British railway operator
