= Hathor (wherry) =

British historical ship

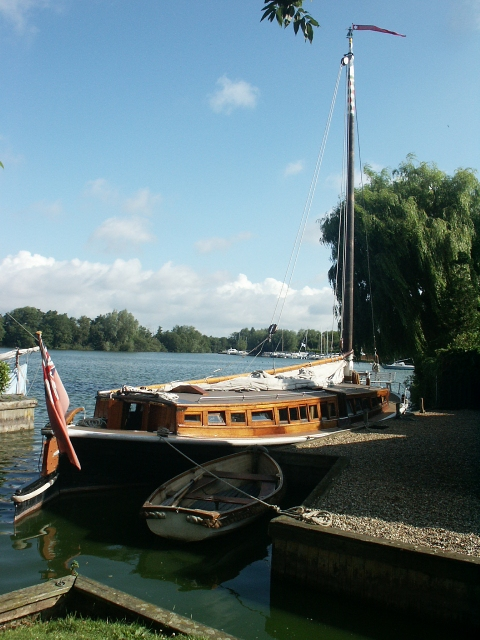
- Hathor at South Walsham Staithe

History

United Kingdom
- Name: Hathor
- Owner: Coleman Family (1905 - 1954); Claud Hamilton (1954 - c1964); Martham Boat Building Company (c1964 - 1985); Wherry Yacht Charter (1985 - present)
- Builder: D S Hall
- Launched: 1905
- Status: In service
- Notes: One of three surviving pleasure wherries

General characteristics
- Class & type: Norfolk Wherry
- Tonnage: 23.01 GT
- Length: 56 ft 0 in (17.07 m)
- Beam: 14 ft 2 in (4.32 m)
- Depth: 4 ft 0 in (1.22 m)
- Sail plan: Gaff-rigged

Hathor (1905) is one of only eight surviving Norfolk wherries to be found on the Norfolk Broads. Like two of the other surviving wherries, Maud and Solace, she was built by Daniel S. Hall of Reedham. Hathor has been listed on the register of National Historic Ships in the United Kingdom since 1996 and is part of the National Historic Fleet.

== History ==
Hathor (pronounced Har-Tor) was built in 1905 for Ethel and Helen Colman, daughters of Jeremiah Colman and Caroline Colman of the Norwich Colman's Mustard dynasty. Ethel later became the first female Lord Mayor of Norwich in 1923. The wherry was named Hathor in memory of Ethel and Helen's brother Alan Colman who had died in Luxor in 1897 whilst on a convalescent trip with the family; they had travelled the Nile on a boat called Hathor.

Hathor's interior was designed by architect Edward T Boardman, the husband of Florence Colman, sister of Ethel and Helen, and son of Edward Boardman, a leading Norwich architect. The design was based on Egyptian hieroglyphics and mythology, which Boardman's partner Graham Cotman had sketched from originals at the British Museum.

The cost of the basic wherry was £595; with an added £1057 spent on internal woodwork and £407 for other fitting out. Hathor had cabins to sleep six, with extra accommodation for the skipper and steward, and made her maiden voyage on 2 August 1905.

Hathor remained in the Colman/Boardman family until 1954 when she was sold to Claud Hamilton, author of Hamilton's Guides to the Broads, who owned her for almost 10 years. She was then sold on and used as a houseboat (with a token mast) at Martham until 1985 when the Wherry Yacht Charter Trust purchased her in a dilapidated state and undertook an extensive two-year restoration.

Hathor is currently in full sailing order and fitted out to charter standard.

== Description ==
Hathor is clinker-built. Her interior has an Egyptian theme designed by Norwich architect Edward Boardman (1833–1910), who was married to Florence Colman (another sister of Alan Colman). She is 60 feet 0 inches (18.29 m) long, with a beam of 14 feet 2 inches (4.32 m) and a draught of 4 feet 0 inches (1.22 m). She is assessed as 23.01 GT. Hathor has not been fitted with an engine and relies on wind and quanting for propulsion.
