= Hathor (disambiguation) =

Hathor is a goddess in ancient Egyptian mythology.

Hathor may also refer to

- Hathor (month), a month of the Coptic calendar
- Hathor (wherry), a Norfolk pleasure wherry
- 2340 Hathor, an asteroid
- "Hathor" (Stargate SG-1), an episode of Stargate SG-1
  - Hathor, a Goa'uld character in Stargate SG-1
- Hathor Exploration Limited, a junior uranium exploration company based out of Vancouver, British Columbia, Canada

== See also ==
- 161 Athor, a Main-Belt asteroid
- Hat Hor, a possible predynastic pharaoh
