= Ethel Colman =

First female Lord Mayor of Norwich

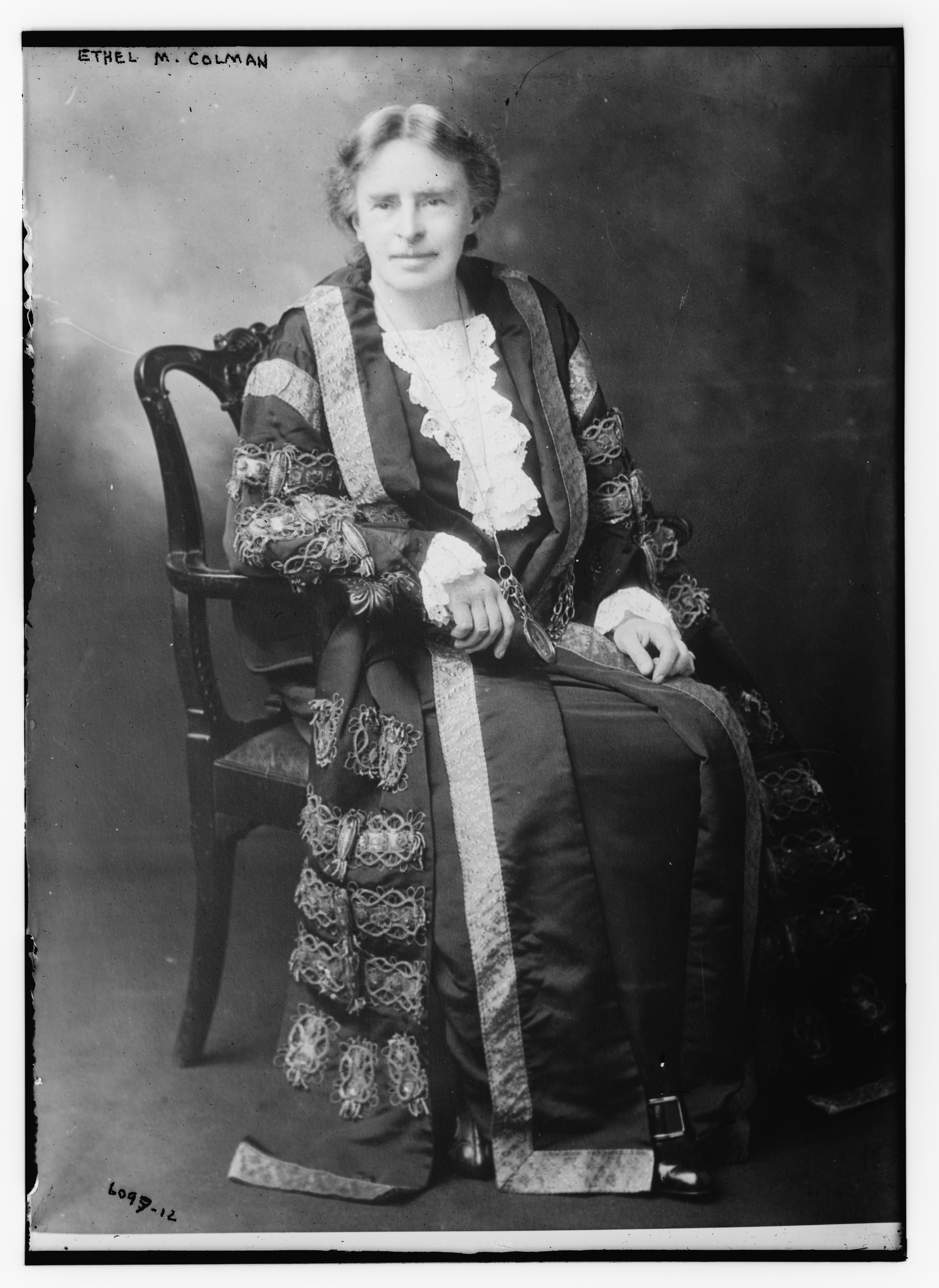
Ethel Colman when Lord Mayor

Ethel Mary Colman (12 February 1863 – 23 November 1948) was a philanthropist and a member of the Colman family who was Lord Mayor of Norwich in 1923–24. She was the first woman to be a Lord Mayor in the United Kingdom.

== Early life ==
Colman was born in 1863, the third of six children to Jeremiah James Colman and his wife Caroline Colman (née Cozens-Hardy). Her father was a member of the Colman family, and managed the Colman's mustard business. Her mother was a member of the Cozens-Hardy family, as established in law in Norwich as the Colmans were in business. Both families were, by religious temperament, non-conformist, and, by political inclination, Liberals. The older children were Laura and Russell; the younger children Helen, Alan and Florence.

Colman's childhood was spent at Carrow House, a neoclassical mansion built in 1861 with internal woodwork carved by local sculptor James Minns. In 1878, when Colman was 15, the family bought Carrow Abbey, a 12th-century Benedictine convent. Once restoration was complete, the family moved from Carrow House to Carrow Abbey. The House then became the administration offices for Colman's mustard works (Carrow Works).

Meanwhile, at the age of 14, Colman had been sent to study in London, at Miss Hannah Pipe's School for Young Ladies in Clapham Park. She was soon joined by her sister Helen. The sisters, who would become lifelong companions, returned to Norwich and rejoined the social life expected of upper-class young ladies of the time.

In 1895 Colman's mother's health collapsed, and consumed by grief at her own father's death, she died. The following year her brother Alan's health also collapsed. Diagnosed with tuberculosis, Laura and Helen accompanied Alan to Egypt for treatment by the dry desert heat. A few weeks later father Jeremiah and Ethel and Florence travelled to join them. Alan's dying wish was to sail on the Nile on a traditional dahabeah, a shallow-bottomed, barge-like vessel with sails. Jeremiah hired the Hathor, and the party travelled in it to Luxor and the Valley of the Kings, where Alan died, aged 30. The following year Florence married architect Edward Thomas Boardman (the son of the more notable architect Edward Boardman); shortly after the wedding Jeremiah died. The effect was to render Ethel and Helen wealthy, independent women. Ethel was one of the first women to be a deacon in the Congregational Church. She was a director of the London Missionary Society.

== Philanthropy ==
The first of the sisters' philanthropic endeavours was a memorial to their brother Alan. This took the form of building a traditional Norfolk wherry, named Hathor after the vessel on the Nile on which Alan took his last journey. Launched in 1905, the Egyption themed interior was designed by brother-in-law architect Edward T. Boardman. The sisters hosted both the famous (the conductor Henry Wood inscribed the visitors' book with a musical score) and the working class (staff from the mustard works, hospital nurses, and their own domestic staff).

In 1913 James Stuart, Ethel's brother in law, husband of her elder sister Laura, died at Carrow Abbey. The sisters' memorial to him was the erection of a block of 22 flats, to re-house some of those affected by the flood of 1912. Stuart Court is still used for low-income housing, managed by Norwich Housing Society.

After Laura Stuart died in 1920, the sisters' memorial to her was to acquire Suckling Hall, a merchant's house of 14th century origins, and to convert and extend it for use as a hall, including cinema use. Again designed by Edward T. Boardman, Stuart Hall was presented to the City of Norwich in 1925. With more recent modifications, Stuart Hall remains in community use, now as Cinema City, part of the Picturehouse chain.

== Lord Mayor ==
On 31 October 1923, it was announced that Ethel Colman had agreed to become the first woman to become Lord Mayor of Norwich. The first woman to become a mayor in the United Kingdom was Elizabeth Garrett Anderson in 1908, of Aldeburgh, Suffolk. Others had followed, but none had been Lord Mayors of a City. On 9 November 1923 Colman was escorted into the Council Chamber at the old Norwich Guildhall.

Colman's sister Helen was the Lady Mayoress during her year in office. During Colman's year in office the Norfolk and Norwich Festival was revived, having been suspended since the start of WWI.

Colman went on to be Deputy Lord Mayor in 1927 to Herbert Witard, the first Labour Lord Mayor.

== Later life ==
In 1929 Princes Street Congregational Church elected Colman a Life Deacon, recognising her long service to the church.

Older brother Russell Colman died in 1946. The following year Helen died. Without her lifelong companion, Ethel Colman faded, and died at Carrow Abbey in 1948, aged 85. The funeral was held at Princes Street Congregational Church. Colman is buried in Rosary Cemetery.

== Legacy ==
There is an Ethel Colman Way in Thetford. Despite her notability as the first woman to be a Lord Mayor, there are no other memorials to her. There is no entry for her in the Oxford Dictionary of National Biography, although there are entries for her father and mother.

Colman is one of the women who is covered in a book published in 2018.
