= Norfolk wherry =

Type of boat on The Broads in Norfolk, England

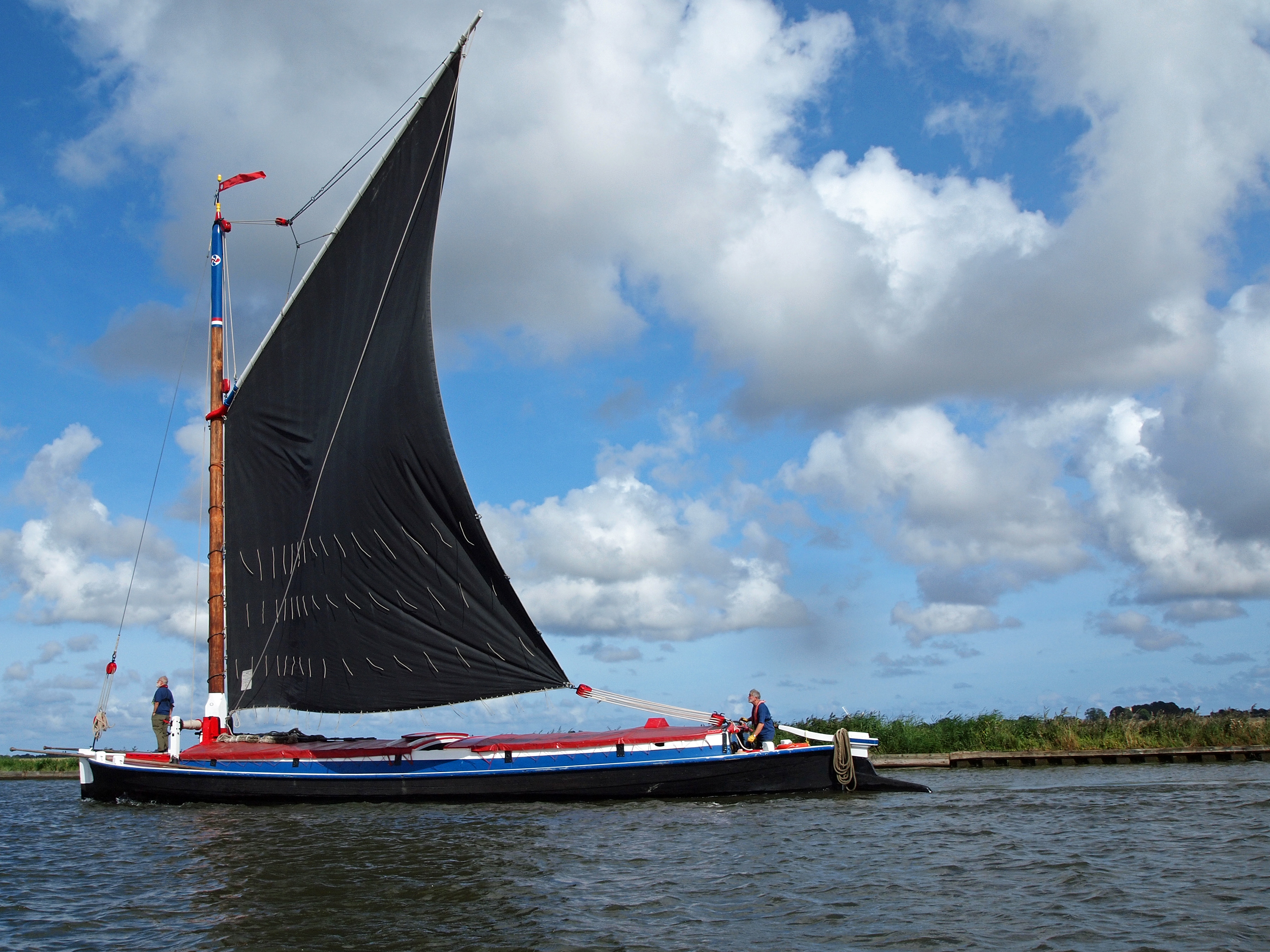
Trading wherry Albion near Ludham

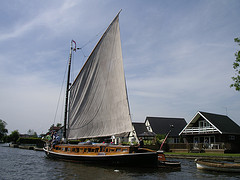
Hathor on the River Bure near Horning

The Norfolk wherry is a type of sailing boat used on The Broads in Norfolk and Suffolk, England. Three main types were developed over its life, all featuring the distinctive gaff rig with a single, high-peaked sail and the mast stepped well forward.

== Development of the wherry ==
Wherries were sail and oar craft dating back to at least 1604. These were small craft, in 1727 being of 8 tons net tonnage. They were still sail and oar boats, fitted with hoops and canvas tilts for the comfort of their passengers. They would have provided a service carrying passengers and small perishable cargoes. Alongside these early wherries were the bigger keels, which were transom-sterned clinker-built barges with a square sail on a mast stepped amidships of about 54 feet (16 m) by 14 feet (4.3 m) and able to carry 30 tons of goods. Keels had been built since the Middle Ages and the design probably went back to the Viking invasion. After 1800, the Norfolk Keel (or 'keel wherry') disappeared, partly because it had limited manoeuvrability and lacked speed and a wherry could be sailed with fewer crew.

== Types of wherry ==
The 'Trading Wherry' developed from the Keel. It is double-ended, its hull painted black with a white nose to aid visibility after dusk. Most trading wherries were clinker-built, but Albion, surviving today, was the sole example to be carvel-built. They carry a gaff rig, the sail historically also black from being treated with a mixture of tar and fish oil to protect it from the elements. The mast tops and wind vanes were often painted or shaped (respectively) to identify the wherry's owner - a traditional design is a 'Jenny Morgan', after a folk song character. Sizes varied, but many of these vessels would carry around 25 tons of goods. Wherries were able to reach larger boats just off the coast at Great Yarmouth or Lowestoft and take their cargoes off to be transported inland through the broads and rivers. The last trading wherry, Ella, was built in 1912.

The 'Pleasure Wherry' evolved as railways took on the cargo business that had supported the traders. Enterprising owners realised that conversion to carry passengers was a way to replace the lost income, especially as the Broads were at the same time being discovered as a destination for tourism and recreation. Early examples simply featured hammocks and a stove in the hold and were converted back to trading for the winter, but boatbuilders soon began to make craft specifically for pleasure sailing and holidays, using the same hull and rig design but incorporating living quarters instead of a cargo hold. Some were fitted out to a very high standard indeed; for example, Hathor, built for the Colman family (of mustard fame), features highly detailed marquetry in Egyptian designs below decks.

For some holidaymakers, the distinction between the working boats and pleasure wherries was not strong enough, and the sleeker and more genteel 'Wherry Yacht' was developed. The main distinguishing features are a smooth, white yacht-like hull and a large counter-stern providing a quiet seating area away from the sail winch and any quanting activity.

Wherries came in different sizes, according to the river they used. The North Walsham and Dilham Canal Wherry was maximum 50 ft (15 m) x 12 ft (3.7 m) x 3' 6". The River Ant Wherry was 50' x 12' max. The River Bure Wherry was 54' x 12' 8", but for the Aylsham Navigation, i.e. the upper reaches of the Bure, the boats had to be 12' 6" x 3' 6" maximum.

On the southern Broads, steam wherries were used. The River Waveney Wherry was 70' x 16' max.

The mast is pivoted with a large counterbalance weight at the bottom. This enables the wherry to lower the mast for passing under bridges. The sail and mast are dropped, the wherry continues forward under its momentum and the mast is raised again on the far side, by the crew of two. If there is no wind, or the wherry must be turned or otherwise manoeuvred, quant poles are used to provide the required force.

A special wherry wheelbarrow was used to unload cargo, e.g. stone, from the wherries. It was made from wood and strengthened with iron bands. It had no legs, therefore it could be rested on the 11-inch-wide (280 mm) planks on the side of the wherry.

== Survivors ==
All types of wherry eventually became uneconomic to operate, but a small number have been saved either by private individuals or charities. Most of the survivors can be seen sailing up and down the rivers and broads today, although some are awaiting full restoration. Of the eight surviving examples of recreational and commercial sailing wherries, seven are on the National Register of Historic Ships. An eighth wherry listed on the Register is Jester a motorised ice wherry of 1923.

In April 2011, Wherry Yacht Charter Charitable Trust opened their restored base in Wroxham, where work on the restoration and maintenance of the Edwardian pleasure wherry Hathor and wherry yachts Norada and Olive can be undertaken in all weathers. The site located at Barton House was part of a £1.5 million project. More recently White Moth and Ardea are also based there. Norada was officially relaunched after restoration in July 2012, while Olive celebrated similarly in July 2013. The Norfolk Wherry Trust keep trading wherry Albion at Forsythe Wherry Yard, off Womack Water at Ludham; trading wherry Maud also berths there in the winter. Solace can usually be seen on Wroxham Broad in the sailing season.

Norfolk wherries
Vessel	Type	Built	Notes
Albion	trading wherry	1898, Oulton Broad	Owned by the Norfolk Wherry Trust. Available for charter.
Maud	trading wherry	1899 Halls of Reedham	Under private ownership. Restored after being sunk for several years on Ranworth Broad.
Solace	pleasure wherry	1903 Halls of Reedham	Under private ownership.
Hathor	pleasure wherry	1905 Halls of Reedham	Owned by Wherry Yacht Charter Charitable Trust. Restored and relaunched in 2015.
Ardea	pleasure wherry	1927 Robinson of Oulton Broad	Spent more than 40 years in Paris as a houseboat; returned to Broads in 2005 and was restored to use by Phillip Davies in 2009 after extensive refurbishment. Now in the care of Wherry Yacht Charter Trust and available for charter.
Olive	wherry yacht	1909 Ernest Collins of Wroxham	Owned by Wherry Yacht Charter Charitable Trust. Available for charter.
Norada	wherry yacht	1912 Ernest Collins of Wroxham	Owned by Wherry Yacht Charter Charitable Trust. Available for charter.
White Moth	wherry yacht	1915 Ernest Collins of Wroxham	Available for charter (Wherry Yacht Charter Charitable Trust). Extensively restored.

Images of wherries can be seen on many pub signs and village signs. There is also a mosaic of a wherry at North Walsham, part of a special monument commemorating the Millennium celebrations.

== Cultural references ==
- Arthur Ransome's children's novel Coot Club (1934) depicts life on board a Norfolk wherry; Albion was used for a BBC television adaptation of this book
- The Wherryman's Way walking trail follows the route of the River Yare from Norwich to Great Yarmouth - a route traditionally used by wherries.
