= Carrow Abbey =

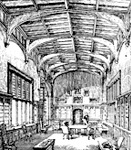

- Location within Norfolk

General information
- Type: Benedictine priory
- Architectural style: Norman
- Location: Bracondale, Norwich, Norfolk, England
- Coordinates: 52°37′4.8″N 1°18′38.9″E
- Completed: 1146

Carrow Abbey is a former Benedictine priory in Bracondale, southeast Norwich, England. The village on the site used to be called Carrow (there are many alternative spellings) and gives its name to Carrow Road, the football ground of Norwich F.C., located just metres to the north. Granted by charter of King Stephen, the abbey was founded ca. 1146, and became a Grade I listed building in 1954.

== History ==
=== Early history ===
The actual date of the house's foundation is not clear. King Stephen, by charter, gave his lands in the fields of Norwich, and a meadow adjoining the land charged to God and the Church of St. Mary and St. John, of Norwich, and the nuns serving there. Stephen directed that such nuns should found their church on such land. They were to hold such lands as freely as the king himself did. Upon this, two of the nuns, who were sisters, Seyna and Lescelina, are said to have begun building the priory in 1146, eight years before Stephen's death, and to have dedicated it to "St. Mary of Carhowe", from which it would seem this was an offshoot of a Norwich nunnery dedicated to St. Mary and St. John (now unknown). The Benedictine nunnery, usually called Carrow Abbey, though only a priory, was founded for a prioress and nine "black nuns", but afterwards twelve nuns were part of its foundation.

In the second year of Stephen's reign the nuns endeavoured to obtain an enlargement of the house's grounds and gave the king a sparrowhawk for having the words cum omnibus libertatibus et liberis consuetudiuibus ad liberas ferias pertinentibus substituted in their charter for the words ad hujusmodi ferias pertinent, and in the next year the corresponding entry occurs on the Pipe rolls. It was not, however, till June of King John's 7th year of reign that the nuns obtained their amended charter. King Henry III, in the 13th year of his reign, confirmed the gift of the land, but is silent as to the cost; in his 19th year, he gave them a general confirmation; and in the 56th year, he confirmed the cost.

The early Rectors of Carrow Mediety, presented by the Prioresses of Carrow, were Robert de Cokethorp (1306), Richard Sekkesteyn of Herdwyk (1330), Richard de'Qirytewafh (1331), Robert King of Cnapeton (1335), John Akewra (1349), Thomas Cowles (1371), John Bale (1385), William Giffard (1388), Walter Aldous of Wingjield (1395), Nicholas Walter (1401), Thomas Catefby (1402), John Felys (1405). The anchoress Julian of Norwich was said to have received her training at the priory in the 1350/60s, and her writings indeed show Benedictine aspects.

A nun at the priory Edith Wilton was elected to be the prioress and her position became official on 6 January 1396. At that time there were about eleven nuns living at the priory with varying finances of about £118 per year.

In 1414 a dispute began over ownership between the Prioress of Carrow and the Prior of Holy Trinity. The involved parties were Robert de Burnham, Prior of Holy Trinity (1407–1427) of County Norwich, and Editha (Edith de Wilton) Prioress of Carrowe. The Prior pleaded that Editha was wrongly described as Prioress of Carrowe as Richard I granted the City of Norwich to the citizens, and the city was in the County of Norfolk till Henry IV separated it and made it a County of itself, which granted the citizens jurisdiction over Carrowe as "within a parcel of the City of Norwich." The Prior further stated that Carrowe was in the parish of Bracondale which is in the County of Norfolk and was never in the City of Norwich. The court ruled in favor of the Prioress stating that Carrow was a parcel of the City of Norwich. Edith Wilton won litigation where she was accused of harbouring a murderer and where she accused the monks of driving away her cattle. Wilton enjoyed the backing of notable citizens and they supported her release on bail after she was arrested. In October 1419 the nuns and the monks made peace. They agreed the jurisdiction of each of their houses and the expensive court cases ceased.

Wilton died in the first half of 1430. One of her successors was not so successful at running the priory. Thomas Wetherby was appointed by the bishop to manage the priory until a new prioress Margaret Pygot was again entrusted to manage without an overseer in 1445. Pygot would put the priory again a firm financial footing increasing annual revenues from £117 to £169. She used these funds to extend the lands that belonged to the convent. Pygot built a new dormitory and repaired the convent's mill.

The convent was responsible for gallows and wills. No record is known of dealing with gallows, but they were often the executors of wills. Wills from the 15th century document many alternate spellings, such as Carhoe, or Carhowe; or Carehowe; or Carrowe. Between 1529 and 1539 there were two priests and eight women-servants. The value of the lead, bells, and buildings was estimated at £145.

In 1538, following the dissolution of the monasteries, Carrow was granted to Sir John Shelton, who lived there briefly until his death the following year. The last prioress, Cecily Stafford, was granted a pension of five pounds a year.

=== Later history and Bracondale Estate ===
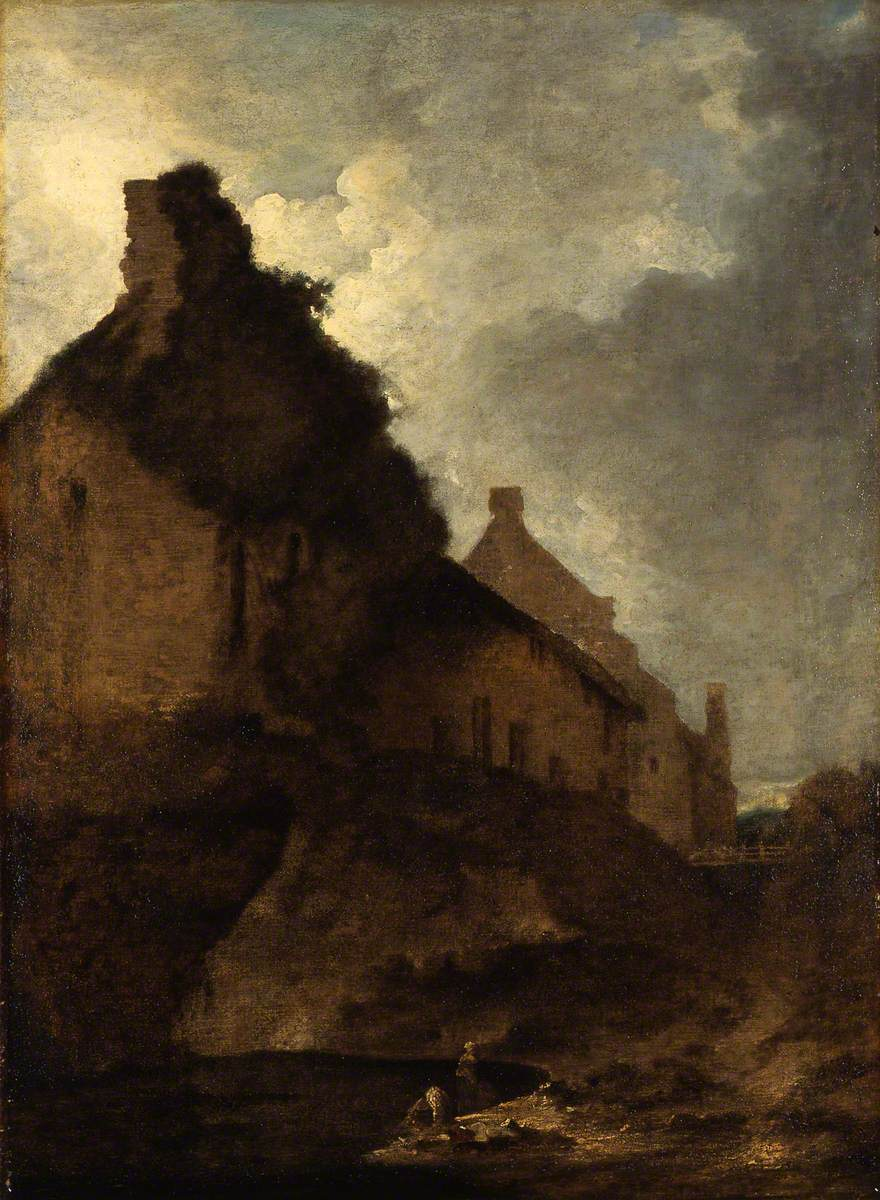
An 1805 painting of the ruinous Abbey by John Crome

By 1712 it was in the possession of Nathaniel Axtell who, in his Monasticon Anglicanum, discusses some of the priory's obituaries. Axtell belonged to St. Julian's and All Saints in Norwich, which were, during the monastic period, under the Prioress of Carrow. The estate, building, lands and manor of Carrow were later purchased by the Martineau family who could trace their descent from a Huguenot refugee. This distinguished medical family found a haven in Norwich from religious persecution. Bracondale Woods and the adjacent Carrow Abbey Estate were both owned by eminent Norwich surgeon Philip Meadows Martineau. Martineau had earlier purchased the adjoining Bracondale Estate in 1793 and then built Bracondale Hall (also known as Bracondale Lodge), described in 1847 as a "handsome mansion with pleasure grounds delightfully laid out". From the ruins of Carrow Abbey, Martineau also constructed on his estate a "small gothic priory with windows of ancient stained glass".

By 1879, Carrow Abbey was in the ownership of the firm J &J Colman who continued to own the estate for many decades. Jeremiah James Colman and his wife Caroline Colman (née Cozens-Hardy) raised their six children there, and their daughter Ethel Coleman, later the first woman Lord Mayor of Norwich, lived there for most of her life. Between 1899 and 1909 they carried out considerable renovation work to the Abbey, including adding a new wing. The Colman family played host to royalty at Carrow Abbey in July 1900, providing a lavish luncheon to the Prince of Wales. James Stuart, politician husband of eldest daughter Laura Coleman, died at Carrow Abbey in 1913.

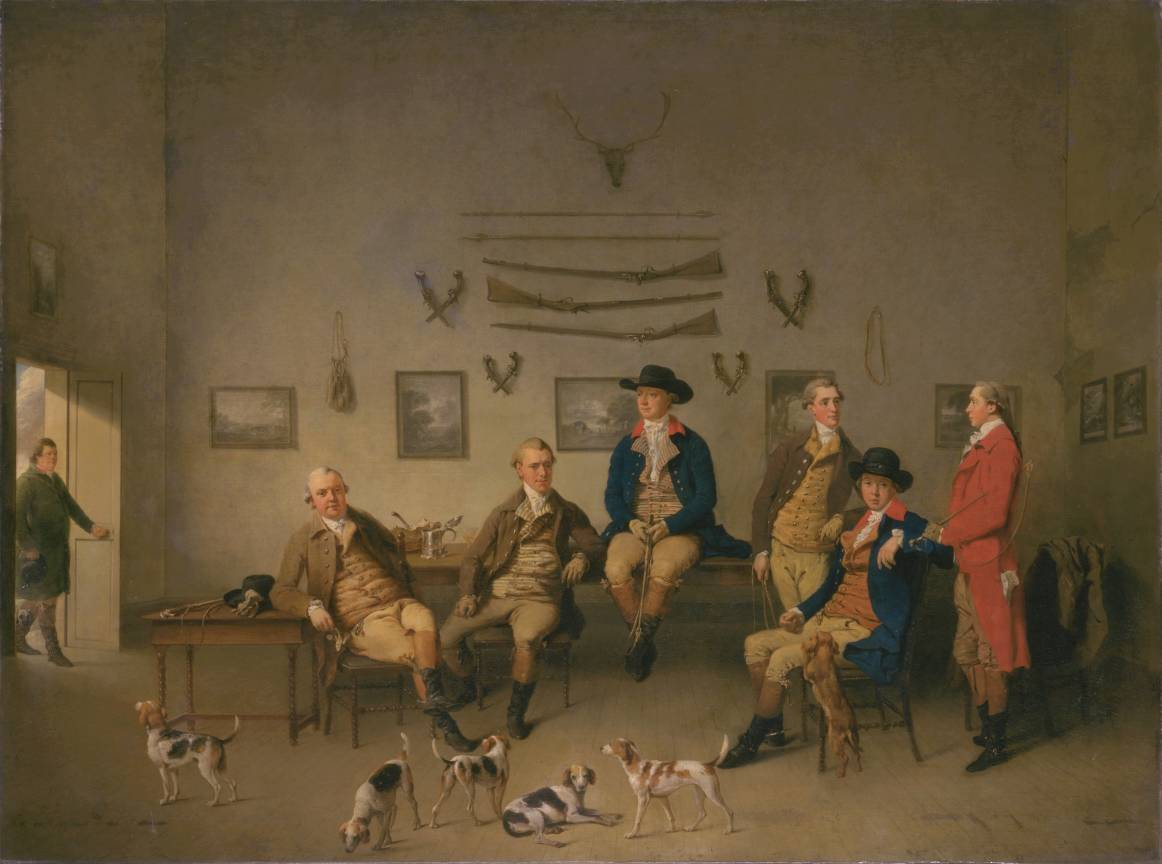
Philip Reinagle painting of the "Carrow Abbey Hunt", 1780

Carrow Abbey was listed as a Grade I listed building on 26 May 1954. Carrow Abbey is the subject of many notable paintings, one of which is of the members of "the Carrow Abbey hunt", painted by Philip Reinagle in 1780.

The Norfolk and Norwich Archaeological Society studied the priory site in 1917 and again in August 2010 when they studied the remaining Norman architecture, the 16th century rooms and gardens.

== Description ==
=== Exterior ===
The foundations of the priory date to 1146, but the rooms mostly date to the early 16th century and late 19th century. The priory is built from knapped flint studded with red brick, brick dressings and plain tiled roof. It is built in 2 storeys and in three parts, with the former parlour on the left, the former hall in the centre and the late 19th century wing on the right.

The former parlour, also known as the Prioress's Parlour and Guest chamber, contains wooden mullioned windows to the left and a small oriel window to the right of first floor. On one of the Tudor doors are the wooden spandrels with the letter “Y” and a gun, which was the rebus of Isabella (Elizabeth) Wygun, the last but one Prioress of Carrow. Some original brick details of the ground-floor window remain as does the central, 4-shafted, ridge chimney. The rear has wooden mullioned windows dated to the late 19th century and a stair turret with brick parapet.

The former Hall, in the centre, contains a square-fronted bay window to the left and a tall wooden mullioned and transomed window to the rear, and late 19th century porch to the right with perpendicular style windows. The brickwork mostly dates to the 16th century. It has a central 3-shafted ridge red brick chimney. The wing to the right of the priory was added in the late 19th century and features a red brick diaper pattern on knapped flint walls. Another wing set back to the right has 2-storeys and an attic, and has five first-floor windows and five dormers.

=== Interior ===
Most of the rooms in the priory are dated to the 16th century and late 19th century during the Coleman renovation. The entrance hall has a great hooded stone fireplace which bears the date 1900. The right wing features intricate moulded plaster ceilings, seen in the dining room and first floor rooms. The interior of the left parlour contains panelling and a fireplace dated to the 16th century on the ground floor A Gothic-style staircase with crockets and lion finials leads up the first floor, which contains bedrooms with moulded ceiling beams.

== Bibliography ==
- Axtell, Nathaniel (1863). "CHARTULARIES OF CARROW ABBEY, NORWICH". Notes and Queries. IV(103) (s3–).
- Beecheno, F. R. Notes on Carrow Priory, Commonly Called Carrow Abbey. British Library, Historical Print Editions. ISBN 978-1-241-33260-0. Archived from the original on 23 October 2023.
- Rye, Walter (1889). "Carrow Abbey". Norwich: Agas H. Goose. Archived from the original on 10 September 2011.
