= Caroline Colman =

Caroline Colman (9 May 1831 – 5 July 1895) was the wife of Jeremiah James Colman, the third member of the family in charge of the eponymous company Colman's mustard. Caroline Colman had exerted significant influence over the social welfare of the company and later go on to introduce numerous social measures for the employees of Carrow Works, between 1857 and her death in 1895.

== Early life ==
Colman, née Cozens-Hardy, was born to William Hardy and Sarah Cozens of Letheringsett Hall on 9 May 1831. She was the eldest of the family's four sons and five daughters.

Before her marriage, Colman dedicated her time to largely helping within the home and the local village. Colman helped her father write and by the age of 20 she had produced her own articles for two separate Wesleyan magazines. She also dedicated time to leading Bible studies, exchanging books with local villagers and reading to inmates of the workhouse.

== Personal life ==
Caroline Colman became engaged to Jeremiah James Colman on 30 January 1855 with the couple being married on 25 September 1856. The wedding celebrations concluded with a fireworks display for the villagers. Upon returning from their honeymoon, it was decided that the Colmans would take up residence in Carrow House, the same Norfolk village in which Jeremiah James Colman's work was based. Caroline would eventually go on to have a significant influence upon the works of her husband.

== Influence at Carrow ==
=== Carrow School ===
In October 1857, Colman opened up a school for the Children of the Carrow Works employees. The school was located in the upper room on King Street and initially taught 22 children in 1857, growing to accommodate 324 children by 1870. Colman oversaw the functioning of the school. In 1859, The Carrow Girls' School was described as 'a picturesque garden in which is a cottage and lofty tower'.

=== Carrow Works ===
The Colmans' married life concentrated largely around the operations of J. & J. Colman factory. The company's scattered factory locations between Stoke and Carrow influenced the first six years of their marriage, with Jeremiah James alternating between these locations.

Despite her husband's absence, Caroline was greatly intrigued by the people employed at Carrow Works, which went on to employ over 2,000 people, mostly recruited from the town of Norwich by 1893. Colman routinely cared for aspects of the business that would benefit from a woman's instruction. These included the School and Kitchen departments. In 1868, Colman began a works' kitchen at Carrow, one of her greatest ventures during her life. The works' kitchen provided hot meals to Carrow Works' employees at affordable prices; vegetable stew and a pint of coffee was available to purchase at just 4d. In the kitchens, Colman acted as 'lady superintendent' and particularised the opening of the kitchens at 5:45 am to provide for those employees who undertook long journeys to work. The development of these work kitchens came almost half a century before the introduction and normalization of work canteens.

In 1864, a dispensary was founded on King Street as part of the Colman's group.

=== Carrow Girls' Home ===
Colman showed much concern over the loneliness of the single girls employed at Carrow and the 'moral danger surrounding them', leading her to establish a residential home to house the girls. A matron was employed to manage the home. Colman instructed that a calendar was to be published and issued to every worker at Christmas, containing religious passages for every day of the upcoming year. Just as she had cared for her neighbors in her home village, Colman directed the annual distribution of care packages for deprived families.

== Death and legacy ==
Colman's health deteriorated in 1895, and she died on the evening of 5 July that same year, aged 64. Colman was buried in Rosary Cemetery, Norwich. Caroline and Jeremiah James had 6 children: Laura (who married the academic and MP James Stuart), Russell, Ethel (who was the first woman to be Lord Mayor of Norwich), Helen, Alan and Florence (who married the architect Edward Boardman, son of the architect Edward Boardman).

As for her earlier achievements within the education sector, it was not until 1990 that Carrow Works school came under the management of the Education Department. Jeremiah James Colman's business was the first to employ an Industrial Nurse, Philippa Flowerday, in 1878. Flowerday was employed to assist the company's doctor in the dispensary as well as paying home visits to the sick. Flowerday's employment and influence on Carrow Works was likely influenced by Caroline.
