= Norfolk Wherry Trust =

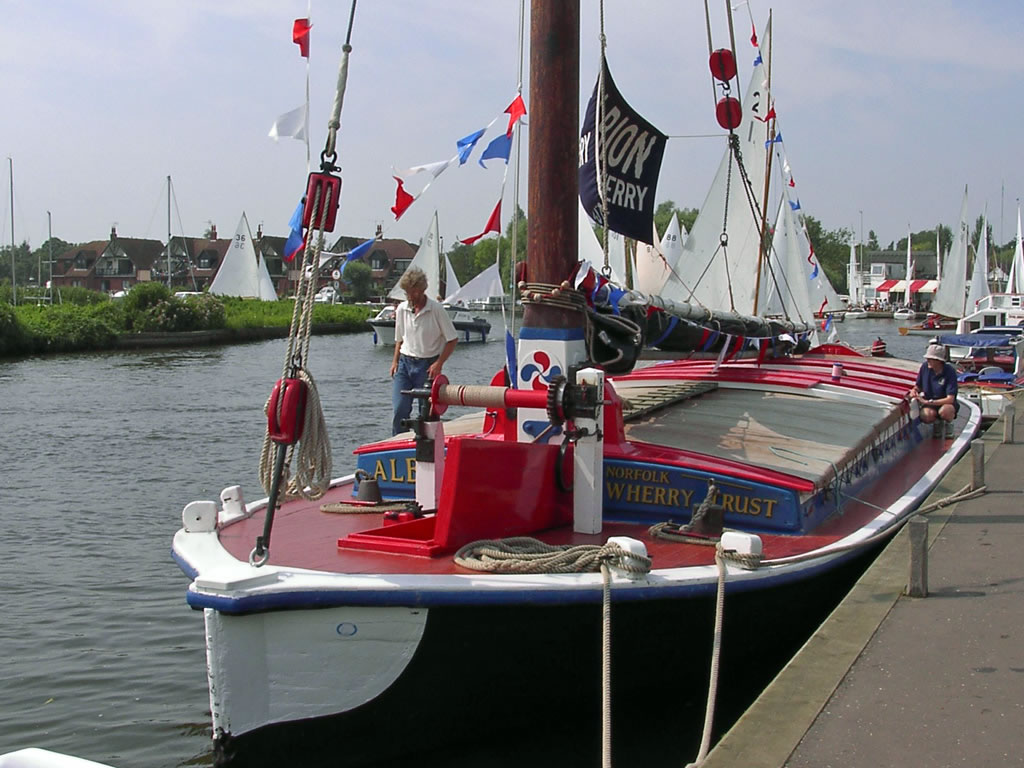
Wherry Albion

The Norfolk Wherry Trust is a waterway society and UK registered charity number 1084156, based at Womack Water near Ludham in the Norfolk Broads, Norfolk, England.

The Trust keeps afloat Albion, an example of the Norfolk trading wherry, so that she can be seen on the rivers and broads.

Albion was built in 1898 - unusually - as a carvel wherry in oak on oak frames, by William Brighton, Lake Lothing, Suffolk (between Oulton Broad and Lowestoft) for Bungay maltsters W. D. and A. E. Walker. All other trading wherries in East Anglia were clinker built. Albion's first load was coal from Lowestoft to Bungay.

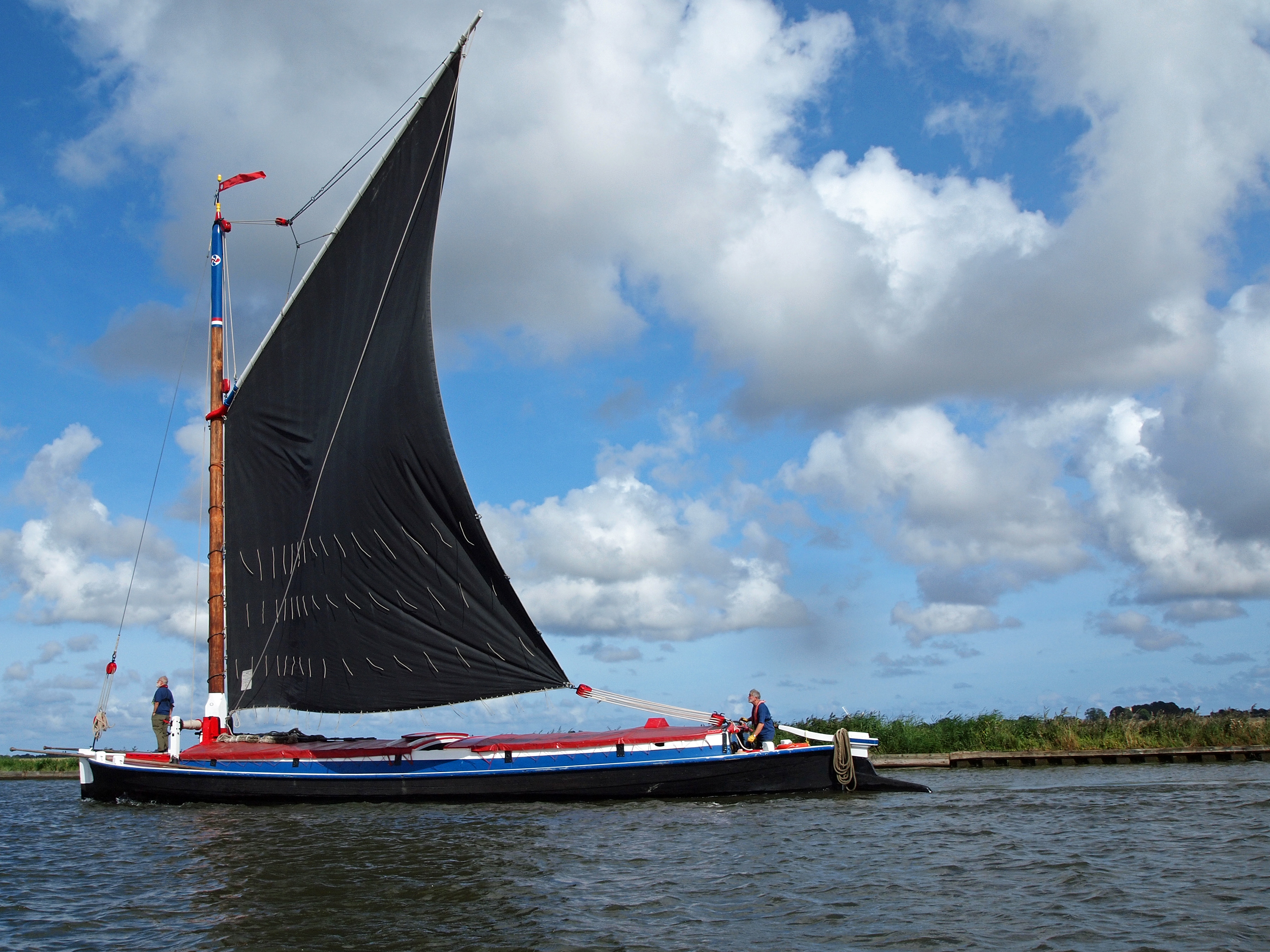
Trading wherry Albion near Ludham

Albion was bought by the General Steam Navigation Company in the 1930s, and later she became a lighter until she was discovered by the Trust in 1949.

In February 1949, a letter in the Eastern Daily Press suggested the formation of a trust to preserve a wherry. The fifty-year-old wherry Albion was then owned by Colman's Mustard factory and was moored at the company's works at Carrow Bridge in Norwich. In October 1949, after restoration work, Albion sailed regularly from Great Yarmouth to Norwich, carrying timber or grain, and sugar beet from Surlingham to Cantley.

However, freight alone could not sustain Albion, and from 1961 she carried passengers. In 1981 the trust acquired a base at Womack Water near Ludham. During 1997, the black-sailed ex-trader Albion carried a total of 648 persons; at any one time she can carry up to 12 people, plus skipper and mate.

== See also ==
- Historic preservation
- List of waterway societies in the United Kingdom
- Norfolk Heritage Fleet Trust
- Wherry Yacht Charter Charitable Trust
- North Walsham and Dilham Canal
