= Edith Wilton =

English prioress

- Born: before 1373
- Died: 1430
- Occupation: nun
- Known for: Prioress at Carrow Abbey

Edith Wilton (before 1373 – 1430) was an English prioress at Carrow Abbey in Norwich.

== Life ==
Wilton began her long career as a nun before 14 February 1373 as on that day she was promoted to be a cellarer which was a position of some responsibility at Carrow Abbey. Wills from the 15th century document many alternate spellings of Carrow, such as Carhoe, or Carhowe; or Carehowe; or Carrowe.

Wilton was elected to be the prioress and her position became official on 6 January 1396. At that time there was about eleven nuns living at the priory with varying finances of about £118 per year.

In 1414 a dispute began over ownership between Wilton and the Prior of Holy Trinity. The dispute was with Robert de Burnham, Prior of Holy Trinity (1407–1427) of County Norwich. de Burnham Prior pleaded that Wilton was wrongly described as Prioress of Carrow as Richard I granted the City of Norwich to the citizens, and the city was in the County of Norfolk till Henry IV separated it and made it a County of itself, which granted the citizens jurisdiction over Carrowe as "within a parcel of the City of Norwich." The Prior further stated that Carrowe was in the parish of Bracondale which is in the County of Norfolk and was never in the City of Norwich. The court ruled in favor of Wilton stating that Carrow was a parcel of the City of Norwich.

Wilton also won litigation where she and another nun were accused of harbouring the murderers of William Koc of Trowse by his widow. Trowse had been killed in 1415 at a cathedral property in Lakenham on 16 August 1415. Wilton had to travel to London to defend herself. She was arrested and was only released when her supporters from Norwich proved surety. The charges were not dropped until 1418 after many adjournments. In return Wilton accused the two monks of driving away her cattle. In October 1419 the nuns and the monks made peace. They agreed the jurisdiction of each of their houses and the expensive court cases ceased.

== Death and legacy ==
Wilton died in the first half of 1430. One of her successors was not so successful at running the priory. Thomas Wetherby was appointed by the bishop to manage the priory until a new prioress Margaret Pygot was again entrusted to manage without an overseer in 1445.
