= Maud (wherry) =

Norfolk wherry built in 1899

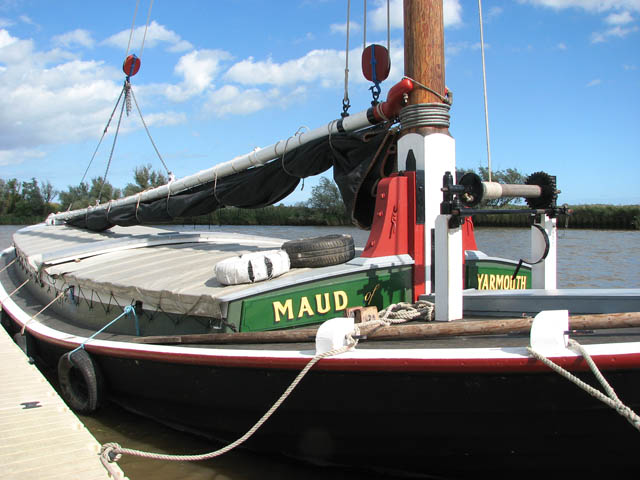
- Maud at Hardley Mill, River Yare.

History

United Kingdom
- Name: Maud
- Owner: Walter Christmas Bunn (1899-1911); Waveney Lighter Co (1911-18); Hobrough (1918-40); May Gurney & Co (1940-mid-1960s); Norfolk Naturalists Trust (mid-1960s-1982); V & L Pargeter (since 1982)
- Builder: D S Hall
- Launched: 1899
- Out of service: Mid 1960s - 1999
- Home port: Great Yarmouth
- Status: Active as of 2010
- Notes: One of only two surviving trading wherries

General characteristics
- Class & type: Wherry
- Tonnage: 20 GT
- Length: 60 ft 0 in (18.29 m)
- Beam: 16 ft 6 in (5.03 m)
- Depth: 4 ft 0 in (1.22 m)
- Sail plan: Gaff-rigged

Maud, along with Albion, is one of only two surviving Norfolk trading wherries to be found on the Norfolk Broads. Maud was built in 1899, and served as a sailing wherry and later as a lighter before being sunk in the mid-1960s as protection for part of the banks of Ranworth Broad. In 1981, she was refloated and taken to Upton where she was restored over a number of years, finally returning to the water in 1999. As of 2010, Maud is active on the Norfolk Broads. She is listed on the register of National Historic Ships in the United Kingdom, as part of the National Historic Fleet.

== Description ==
Maud is clinker-built. She is 60 feet 0 inches (18.29 m) long, with a beam of 16 feet 6 inches (5.03 m) and a depth of 4 feet 0 inches (1.22 m). She is assessed as 20 GT.

== History ==
Maud was built by D S Hall of Reedham for Walter Bunn, a builder's merchant of Great Yarmouth. She carried general cargo and timber in connection with Bunn's business. In 1911, she was sold to the Yare and Waveney Lighter Co Ltd, of Norwich and then in 1918 Maud was sold to Hobrough's of Norwich. During Hobrough's ownership, she was dismasted and used as a barge in connection with dredging operations. In 1940, Hobrough was taken over by May, Gurney & Co Ltd. They used Maud as a lighter until after the Second World War, when she was fitted with a Kelvin engine.

In the early 1950s, Maud was damaged in an accident whilst loading coal at Norwich Power Station. Following this, she was replanked from the waterline up, with a new deck also being provided. May Gurney replaced their wherries with modern lighters in the early 1960s. Maud was sunk as a breakwater on Ranworth Broad in the mid-1960s, along with the wherry Bell. In 1976, Maud was moved elsewhere within Ranworth Broad and was resunk. In 1981, it was decided to pile the riverbank where Maud lay, and she was given to millwright Vincent Pargeter, and his wife Linda, on the understanding that the boat would be restored.

Maud was taken to Upton, where she restored over a period of 18 years, being returned to the water in her centenary year. Restoration was assisted by grants from the Broads Authority and an appeal via the Transport Trust. In 1996, she was added to the register of National Historic Ships in the United Kingdom.
