= Philippa Flowerday =

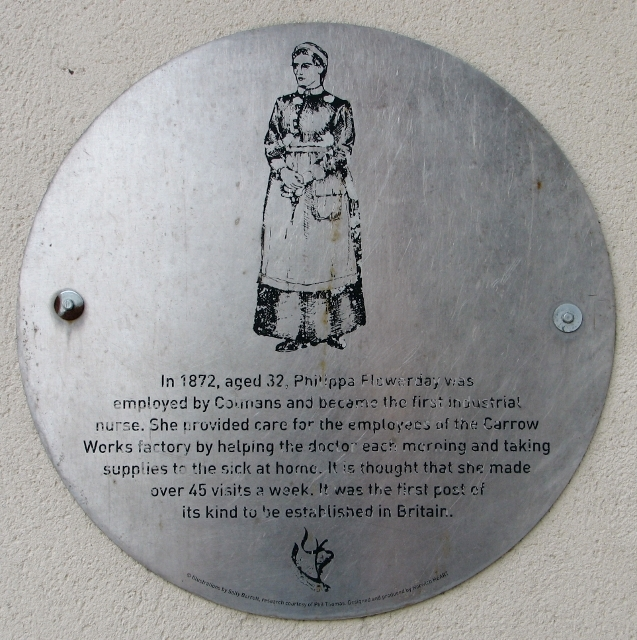
Plaque at Carrow Works

Phillipa Flowerday (1846–1930) was the first nurse appointed to work in connection with an industrial concern, generally considered the first industrial nurse. Phillipa joined Colman's in Carrow, Norwich, in 1878 at a rate of 26 shillings per week as a district nurse. Her duties included visiting the homes of sick/incapacitated employees, in addition to assisting the doctor at the dispensary at Carrow Works mustard factory.

== Early life ==
According to the 1881 National Census her birth name was given as Phillipa, not Philippa. Flowerday was born September 1846 in Erpingham, North Norfolk. Prior to joining Colman's she had trained and worked at Norfolk and Norwich hospital.

== Personal life ==
In 1888 she gave up her work to marry widower, William Reed, head gardener at the Clyffe, Corton, the Colman family summer house. Phillipa and William Reed lived in Corton with his two children from his first marriage. William died in 1906 and Philippa then moved to Lowestoft and lived in Sussex Street until 1930, when she died at the age of 84. She is buried in Antingham, North Norfolk.
