= Wherry Yacht Charter Charitable Trust =

British waterway society and registered charity

- Abbreviation: WYCCT
- Formation: 2002; 24 years ago
- Founder: Peter Bower, Barney Matthews
- Founded at: Wroxham
- Registration no.: 1096073
- Headquarters: Wroxham, Norfolk, UK
- Services: Private charters, public sailings, public viewings
- Key people: John Ash, Andrew Scull, Katy Walters, Peter Bower
- Revenue: £136,224 (2024)
- Expenses: £120,148 (2024)
- Staff: 4
- Volunteers: 75
- Website: wherryyachtcharter.org

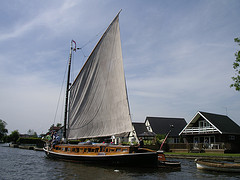
Norfolk Wherry "Hathor"

The Wherry Yacht Charter Charitable Trust (WYC) is a waterway society and registered charity number 1096073, on the Norfolk and Suffolk Broads in East Anglia, England, UK. They operate and charter 5 historic wherries, those boats being 5 of the 8 remaining wherries.

== History of the trust ==
Wherry Yacht Charter originated as a business in 1985 run by Peter Bower and Barney Matthews, first chartering their wherry yachts Olive and Norada, and later acquiring and restoring pleasure wherry Hathor. The Trust was established in 2002 and its stated aims are to restore, protect and sail the three Norfolk wherries Hathor, Olive and Norada, and to keep them together as the only remaining wherry fleet.

The Trust obtained a grant of £640,500 from the Heritage Lottery Fund to purchase the wherries Hathor, Norado and Olive to give the public access to the boats, and to run environmental education programs Each year, in a sailing season from approximately Easter to October, the Trust offers a series of public sailing trips and wherry viewings, and makes the wherry yachts available for private charter.

In recent years, the Trust has also acquired the use of two further wherries: White Moth (1912) and Ardea (1927), allowing further charter income to be generated.

== The trust's wherries ==
Hathor was built in 1905 at Reedham, Norfolk as a private holiday vessel for the Colman's Mustard and Boardman families, a role she fulfilled until the 1950s. She was subsequently owned for a period by Claud Hamilton, author of Hamilton's Guides to the Broads, and later spent a period (dismasted) as a houseboat at Martham. She was purchased by WYC in 1985, and, after 2 years of restoration work was used for holiday and educational charters for over 20 years. After a Farewell Tour in 2009 she was laid up, and in 2013 was hauled out for a 2-year restoration. Her relaunch event in 2015 saw five wherries sailing on the River Ant at How Hill, and she now provides sailing opportunities and school visits in the summer season.

Norada was built in 1912 at Wroxham and worked as a hire boat until 1950. After a time with private owners, which also saw a name change to Lady Edith, she was bought by Barney Matthews in 1964 and underwent extensive restoration. She was let out for charter again from 1984, and reverted to her original name on her 75th anniversary in 1987. From 2006 Norada was out of the water for restoration of the hull, and was relaunched in 2011. She is now used for private charters and public sailings.

Olive was built in 1909 at Wroxham and worked as a hire boat until 1958. She had four more owners until she was restored by the Trust and used for educational charters. In 2005 she sank at her moorings but has undergone repair and restoration and was relaunched in 2013. She is now used for private charters and public sailings.

Ardea (1927) was built in Leo Robinson's yard for millionaire Howard Hollingsworth. She has a teak varnished hull. On the varnish is a metal representation of a heron from which the boat gets its name. After 30 years she was sold to a French owner where she was a houseboat (allegedly for the girls of a Parisian madame). Then in 1974 was purchased by Philippe Rouff. The boat was restored in 2005 by Maynard Watson, and subsequently bought by Scull.

White moth (1912), a 10-metre wherry which once also served as a houseboat and at one point was sunk.

== See also ==
- List of waterway societies in the United Kingdom
- Norfolk Wherry Trust
- Norfolk Heritage Fleet Trust
- North Walsham and Dilham Canal
- East Anglian Waterways Association
