= Margaret Pygot =

- Born: 1400s
- Died: in 1474 or after
- Occupation: Benedictine nun
- Known for: Prioress at Carrow Abbey

Margaret Pygot ( – in 1474 or after) was an English prioress of Carrow Abbey. She put the Abbey on a firm financial footing.

== Life ==
Land in Norwich had been given by King Stephen to provide for nuns, and it was founded in 1146. Edith Wilton had been a successful prioress and she had died in 1430. One of her successors was not so successful at running the priory and Thomas Wetherby had been appointed by the bishop to manage the priory. In 1444 Margaret Pigot was promoted to the Prioress. She had been at the convent for some years and had been promoted to be a cellarer in 1442. Her sister Alice was a supporter and there was another relative, Agnes, who gave some money.

Pygot was entrusted to manage the abbey without an overseer in 1445. Pygot would put the priory on a firm financial footing, increasing annual revenues from £117 to £169. She had widows and children choosing to live with the nuns and one of the guests included her relative Agnes. Pygot used these new funds to extend the lands that belonged to the convent. Pygot built a new dormitory and repaired the convent's mill, and she was entrusted to be an executor of people's wills. In 1448 she asked the King to confirm their rights to their land.

In 1466 Pygot was present at an important funeral for John Paston, at Bromholm. Gifts included Pygot who was given six shillings and eight pence, and her maid was given twenty pence. The anchoress at Carrow was also given forty pence (see below). Julian of Norwich had been a noted anchoress in St Julian's Church in Norwich. This church was associated with the abbey. Julian of Norwich died in or around 1416 but the anchoress's cell in the corner of the churchyard did not remain empty. During Pygot's time, the anchoress there was Julian(a) Lampit or Lampett. She was there for fifty years from 1428 until 1478.

Pygot's death date is unclear but she was alive in 1474 and she was buried at the abbey.
