= Norfolk Heritage Fleet Trust =

Norfolk Heritage Fleet Trust is a charitable organisation based at Hunter's Yard in Ludham, Norfolk, England. The Trust owns and operates Hunter's Yard and its historic fleet of traditional wooden sailing craft on the Norfolk Broads. Its charitable objects include providing facilities for sail training and maintaining, promoting, restoring, conserving, improving and developing historic and traditional sailing and other craft relating to the Norfolk and Suffolk Broads for the public benefit.

Hunter's Yard was established by boatbuilder Percy Hunter in 1932 and became the base for a fleet of wooden sailing yachts built principally by Percy and his sons Cyril and Stanley Hunter during the 1930s and 1940s. The yard was acquired by Norfolk County Council in 1968 and operated as the Norfolk County Sailing Base, with an emphasis on encouraging young people to sail. In 1995 the council decided to sell the yard and fleet. Following a campaign to preserve the operation, the Norfolk Heritage Fleet Trust took over the yard and fleet in 1996.

The Trust maintains the boats as working sailing craft rather than solely as museum exhibits. The fleet is used for sailing holidays, training and educational activities, while Hunter's Yard remains a working traditional boatyard. The Trust also provides opportunities for children and young people to experience sailing and the heritage of the Norfolk Broads, including through Project Starfish.

== History ==
=== Hunter's Yard and the origins of the fleet ===
Hunter's Yard is situated on Womack Water at Ludham. Percy Hunter established the boatyard in 1932, building the first boats specifically for sailing on the shallow and confined waterways of the Norfolk Broads. A second boat shed was constructed in 1935 as the fleet expanded. Percy Hunter worked with his sons Cyril and Stanley, and most of the surviving historic fleet was built at Ludham between 1932 and 1949.

The yard was operated by the Hunter family until 1968, when it was acquired by Norfolk County Council and renamed the Norfolk County Sailing Base. The council maintained the traditional character of the yard and its fleet but placed particular emphasis on youth sailing and outdoor education. Schools were encouraged to use the yachts, and generations of young people experienced sailing from the yard during this period.

The connection between Hunter's Yard and youth sailing therefore predates the Norfolk Heritage Fleet Trust. The Trust subsequently continued and developed this educational role alongside the preservation of the historic boats and boatyard.

=== Formation of the Norfolk Heritage Fleet Trust ===
In 1995 Norfolk County Council decided to sell Hunter's Yard and its fleet as part of an economy programme. The proposed sale led to a campaign to preserve the yard, boats and associated traditions as a single operation. A fundraising campaign was undertaken and a £200,000 grant was awarded by the Heritage Lottery Fund. The Norfolk Heritage Fleet Trust subsequently took over the yard and fleet in 1996 and restored the historic name of Hunter's Yard.

The Trust's memorandum and articles of association were incorporated on 16 October 1995, and the organisation was registered as a charity on 26 January 1996. Its charitable objects are to advance the education of the public through facilities for sail training and to maintain, promote, restore, conserve, improve and develop historic and traditional sailing and other craft relating to the Norfolk and Suffolk Broads for the public benefit.

The establishment of the Trust enabled the historic fleet to remain together at its original base and continue operating as a working fleet. The preservation of the relationship between the boats, their original boatyard and the skills required to maintain them became central to the Trust's activities.

At the same time as the formation of the Trust, the Association of Friends of the Hunter Fleet (now the Friends of Hunter's Yard) was formed to support the Trust through donations and fundraising.

=== Hunter's Yard and the Trust ===
Hunter's Yard is both the operational base of the Norfolk Heritage Fleet Trust and an important part of the heritage it preserves. The Trust's work encompasses not only the individual vessels but also the historic boat sheds, equipment, working practices and traditional skills associated with the yard.

The yard's two original sheds remain associated with the fleet. The boats continue to be maintained and repaired at Hunter's Yard, allowing traditional wooden-boat skills to remain part of a working environment rather than being preserved solely as historical exhibits.

The continuing operation of Hunter's Yard has attracted coverage outside Norfolk. In 1997, shortly after the Trust took over the operation, The Independent described Hunter's Yard as the home of the Norfolk Heritage Fleet Trust and referred to its surviving group of Broads charter yachts as the last surviving cluster of charter yachts on the Broads to remain unaltered since their construction in the 1930s.

In 2026 the Financial Times reported on sailing from Hunter's Yard aboard one of its historic yachts, describing the yard as a historic boatyard established in 1932 and highlighting the continued use of its traditional wooden fleet.

In 2026 the American specialist magazine WoodenBoat described Hunter's Yard as operating a fleet of traditional wooden boats and identified the Norfolk Heritage Fleet Trust as the charity that owns and runs the yard.

=== Youth sailing and Project Starfish ===
Youth sailing has been an important part of the history of Hunter's Yard since the period of Norfolk County Council ownership. The Norfolk Heritage Fleet Trust continued this educational role following its establishment, using the historic fleet to provide sailing opportunities for children and young people as well as members of the public.

Project Starfish is a later development of the Trust's youth and educational work. The programme provides opportunities for children and young people to experience sailing aboard the historic Hunter's Yard fleet while also taking part in activities connected with the history, environment and traditional skills of the Norfolk Broads.

The project has included day sailing experiences, onshore heritage activities, Royal Yachting Association courses and residential sailing. It has worked with schools and youth organisations, with the stated aim of expanding access to heritage sailing for young people across Norfolk, including those who might otherwise have limited opportunities to participate.

Project Starfish has received support from charitable funders. The Alan Boswell Group Charitable Trust reported that grants awarded in 2022 and 2024 enabled the Norfolk Heritage Fleet Trust to take 311 primary-school children sailing in 2023 and 492 primary-school children and 81 young people from other charities sailing in 2024.

The programme represents a continuation of the educational use of Hunter's Yard, using historic sailing vessels not only as objects of conservation but as working craft through which children and young people can experience sailing and the maritime heritage of the Norfolk Broads.

=== Preservation and continued use ===
The Trust maintains the historic fleet as working sailing vessels. The boats are used for sailing holidays, training and educational activities, while maintenance and restoration are carried out at Hunter's Yard. This combination of conservation and continued use allows the boats to remain operational while traditional boatbuilding and maintenance skills continue to be practised.

National Historic Ships describes the principal Norfolk Heritage Fleet at Hunter's Yard as consisting of 14 classic cabin yachts and two half-deckers, with a further six wooden half-deckers donated to the yard. The vessels include boats built in the 1930s and 1940s as well as the later cabin yacht Lucent, launched in 2008.

== Fleet ==
Hunter's Yard's principal heritage fleet consists of traditional wooden cabin yachts and half-deckers designed for the shallow and confined waters of the Norfolk Broads. The cabin yachts are gaff-rigged sloops with shallow draughts and counter-weighted tabernacle masts, allowing their masts to be lowered to pass beneath bridges.

=== Cabin yachts ===
The cabin yachts comprise several related designs and classes, principally the Hustler, Wood and Lullaby classes. The boats range from approximately 24 to 29 feet in length.

| Class | Boats | Principal characteristics |
|---|---|---|
| Hustler | Hustler, Hustler II, Hustler III, Hustler IV, Hustler V | Two-berth gaff-rigged cabin yachts, approximately 24 feet long |
| Wood | Wood Sorrel, Wood Violet, Wood Rose, Wood Anemone, Wood Avens | Three-berth gaff-rigged cabin yachts, approximately 24 feet long |
| Lullaby | Lullaby, Lustre, Luna, Lucent | Four-berth gaff-rigged cabin yachts, approximately 28–29 feet long |

The oldest boats include Lullaby and Lustre, launched in 1932, followed by Luna in 1933. Most of the historic cabin yachts were built during the 1930s and 1940s.

Lucent is the most recent addition to the cabin-yacht fleet. Built at Hunter's Yard as a modern interpretation of the Lullaby-class design, she was launched in 2008 and was based on the lines of the earlier Luna.

=== Half-deckers ===
Hunter's Yard also has a collection of traditional wooden half-deckers used principally for day sailing and youth activities. National Historic Ships records two half-deckers as part of the principal Norfolk Heritage Fleet and identifies a further six wooden half-deckers donated to the yard, including a Yare and Bure One Design, a Waveney One Design and three Rebel One Designs.

The wider collection has included boats such as Buff Tip, Sundew, Rebel Reveller, Brown Bess and the two Woodcut boats.

=== Cultural associations ===
The boats of Hunter's Yard have also acquired wider cultural associations through their connection with children's literature and film and television productions set on or around the Norfolk Broads.

The Norfolk Broads form the setting for Arthur Ransome's novels Coot Club and The Big Six. Boats associated with Hunter's Yard have subsequently been used in screen productions connected with the Broads and Ransome's work.

The continued use of the vessels at their historic base provides a connection between traditional Broads yacht design, boatbuilding, sailing and the cultural history of the Norfolk Broads.

== See also ==
- Norfolk Broads
- Norfolk Wherry Trust
- Wherry Yacht Charter Charitable Trust
- Traditional boat
