= Setting pole =

Pole used to move boats or barges

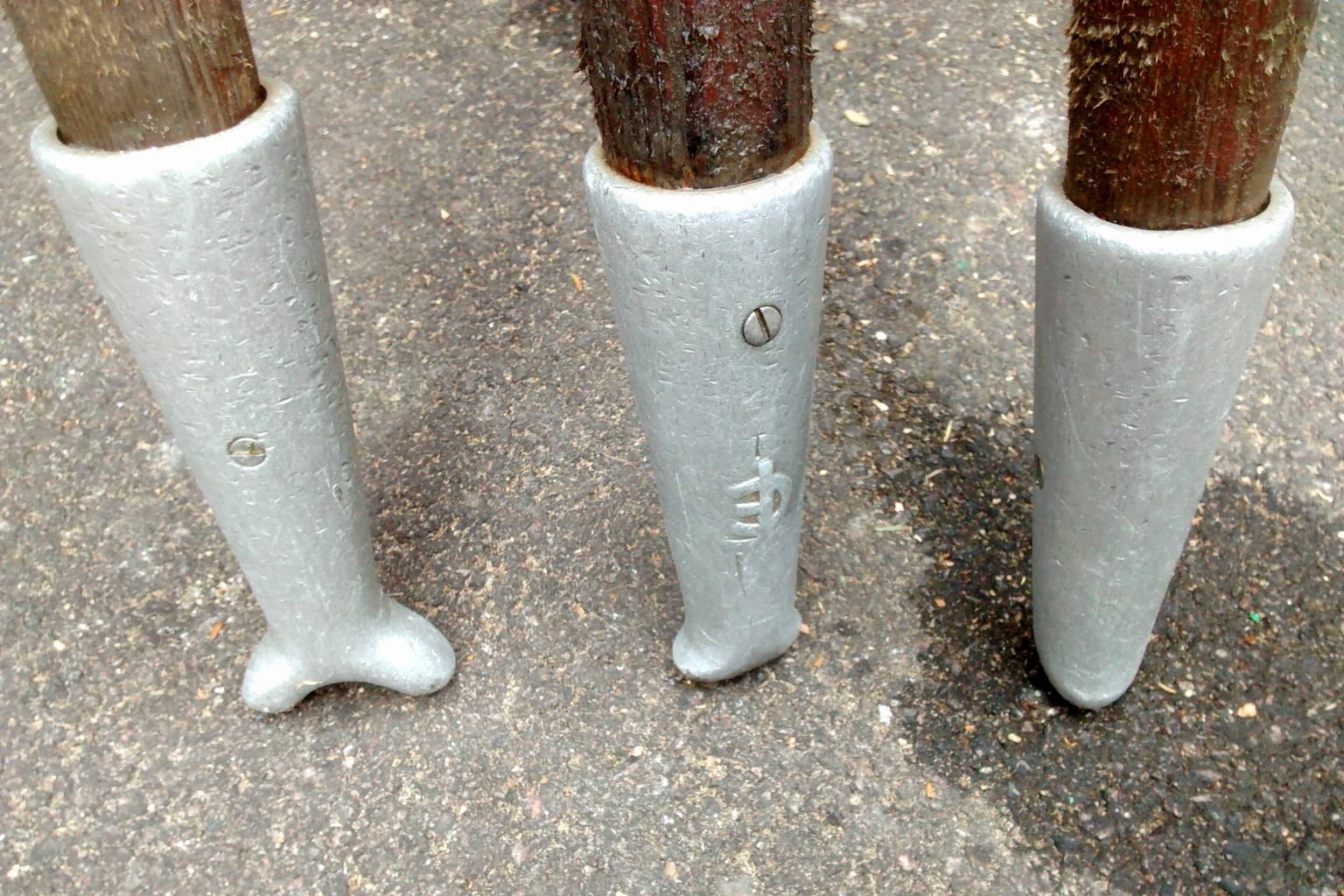
Three punt pole shoes in varying states of wear

A setting pole or quant (quant pole) is a pole, handled by a crew member, to move boats, barges (in which case it is also called a barge pole) or punts by pushing the craft in the desired direction. The pole is used to push against the river or sea bed or, in some cases, the bank of the river. If used from the stern of the craft, the action is usually called "punting." Especially on larger vessels, it is more effective if the operator starts at the bow and walks aft along a side deck, pushing against the bottom all the way – this action is called "quanting" or "setting". If there is a short stretch where the water is too deep for the pole to reach the bottom, the pole can be used as a paddle. Whilst this is substantially less effective than a bladed oar or paddle, it is sufficient to keep the boat moving.

A setting pole is usually made of ash or a similar resilient wood or of hollow metal so that in either case it floats if left in the water. They are usually capped on one or both ends with metal to withstand the repeated pushing against the bottom and rocks, and to help the end of the pole sink to the bottom more quickly. A barge quant often has a cap at the top and a prong at the bottom to stop it from sinking into the mud. On the Norfolk Broads these are called a Bott and a Shoe respectively.

It can range in length from eight feet (2.4 metres), to over eighteen feet (5.5 metres). A quant is used not only to propel craft, but also to steer them by acting as a rudder. The operator of the quant can stick the quant behind the barge or punt to determine the direction of travel.

There is also a popular saying: "I wouldn't touch that thing with a barge pole!" (sometimes rendered as "a 10-foot pole").

== History ==
=== Origins ===
Use of a setting pole is probably the oldest form of propulsion of waterborne craft.

== Regional variants ==
=== American West ===
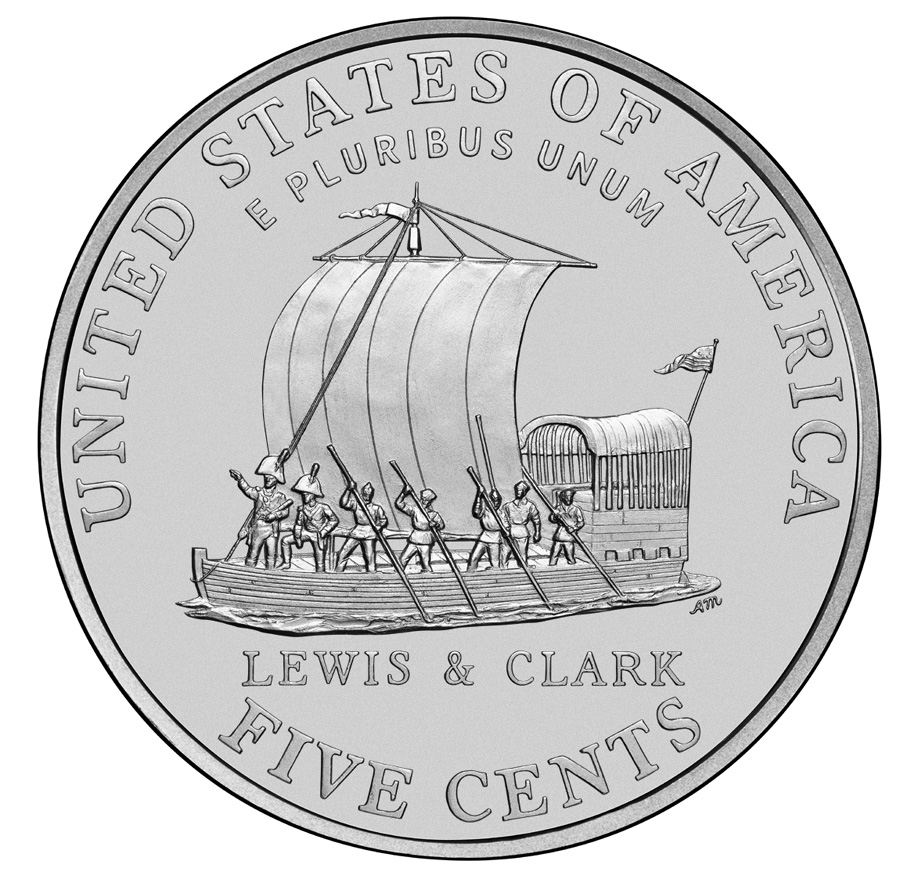
Setting poles propelling Lewis and Clark's keelboat on the back of the 2004 U.S. Nickel

Setting poles were used widely on the rivers of the 18th and 19th century American West to propel keelboats. The 1804 Lewis and Clark expedition relied on setting poles to propel their barge on the Missouri River. They brought six purpose-built setting poles, each eighteen feet long and capped with iron on the bottom, though they ended up losing some and replacing them with dog-travois poles taken from an abandoned Native American camp.

=== Mesopotamian Marshes ===
Setting poles are also used widely on the Mesopotamian Marshes to propel the mashoof canoes used by the Marsh Arabs. These poles are called marda (مُرْدِيّ in Literary Arabic) and are 10–13 feet (3.0–4.0 meters) long and made from wood and sturdy reeds.

=== Northeastern North America ===
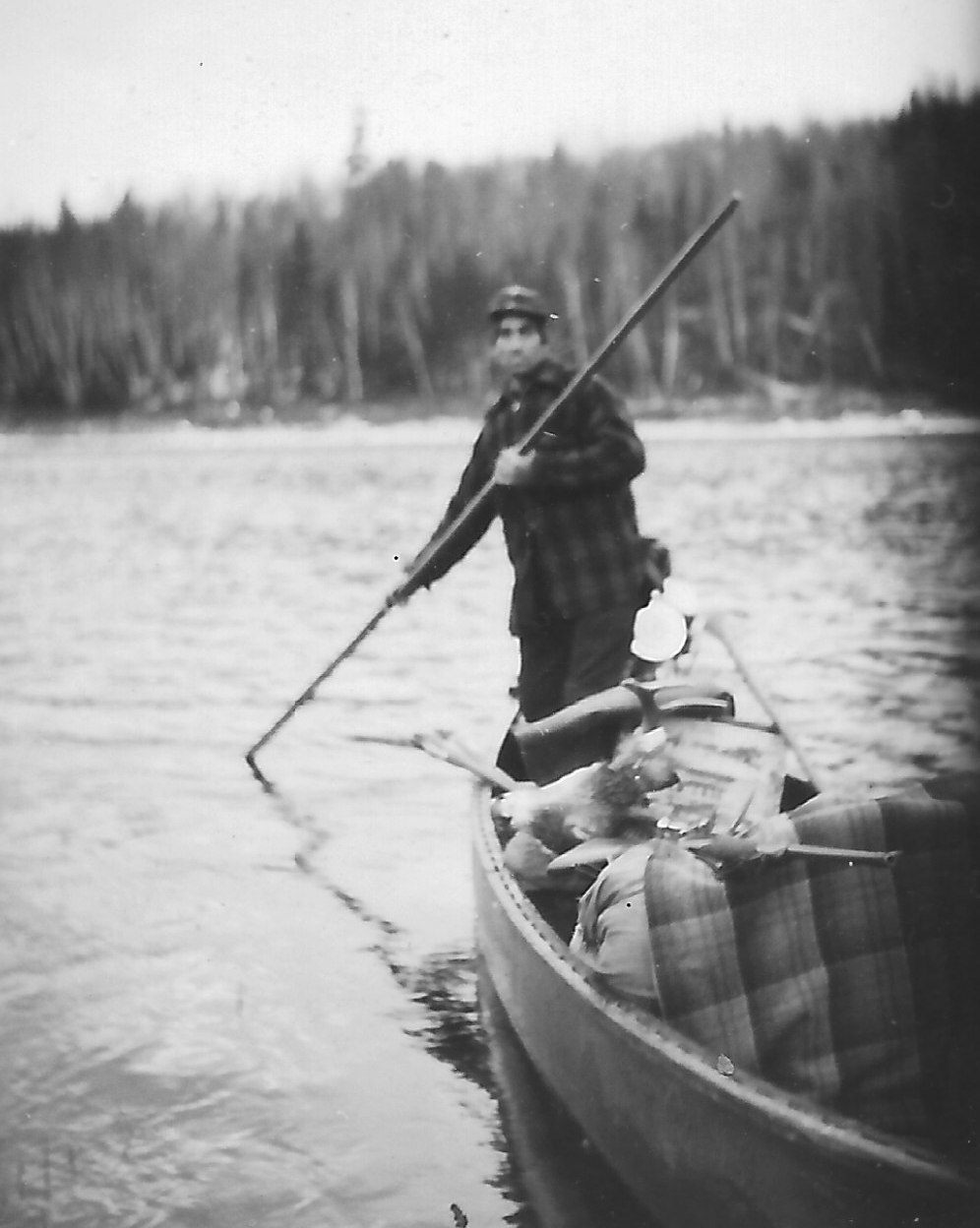
poling a canoe on the Allagash River about 1940

Lighter setting poles, commonly made of spruce, were widely used in the shallow, often rocky rivers of northeastern North America to propel canoes, especially in very shallow water and when going upriver against a current. This technique makes it possible to propel a loaded canoe up through substantial whitewater, something which is very hard or impossible to do with paddles. Some modern recreational paddlers still use this technique but it is much less common that it was in the times when people in this region used canoes as an essential means of transportation.

=== Oxbridge ===
The best known form of setting pole is the single-ended punt pole used in Oxford and Cambridge. A setting pole may also be used in river canoeing for navigating portions of river where the water is too shallow for a paddle to create thrust, or where the desired direction of travel is opposite a current moving fast enough to make paddling inefficient. Setting poles are also useful for fending off drifting logs and negotiating sandbars, shoals, and rocks.

=== Norfolk Broads ===
On the Norfolk Broads, a quant is used to propel yachts and working craft, especially those lacking an engine, when the wind does not suit. Large sailing wherries employed a quant pole at least 8 metres (26 ft) in length.

== Using a quant (quanting) ==
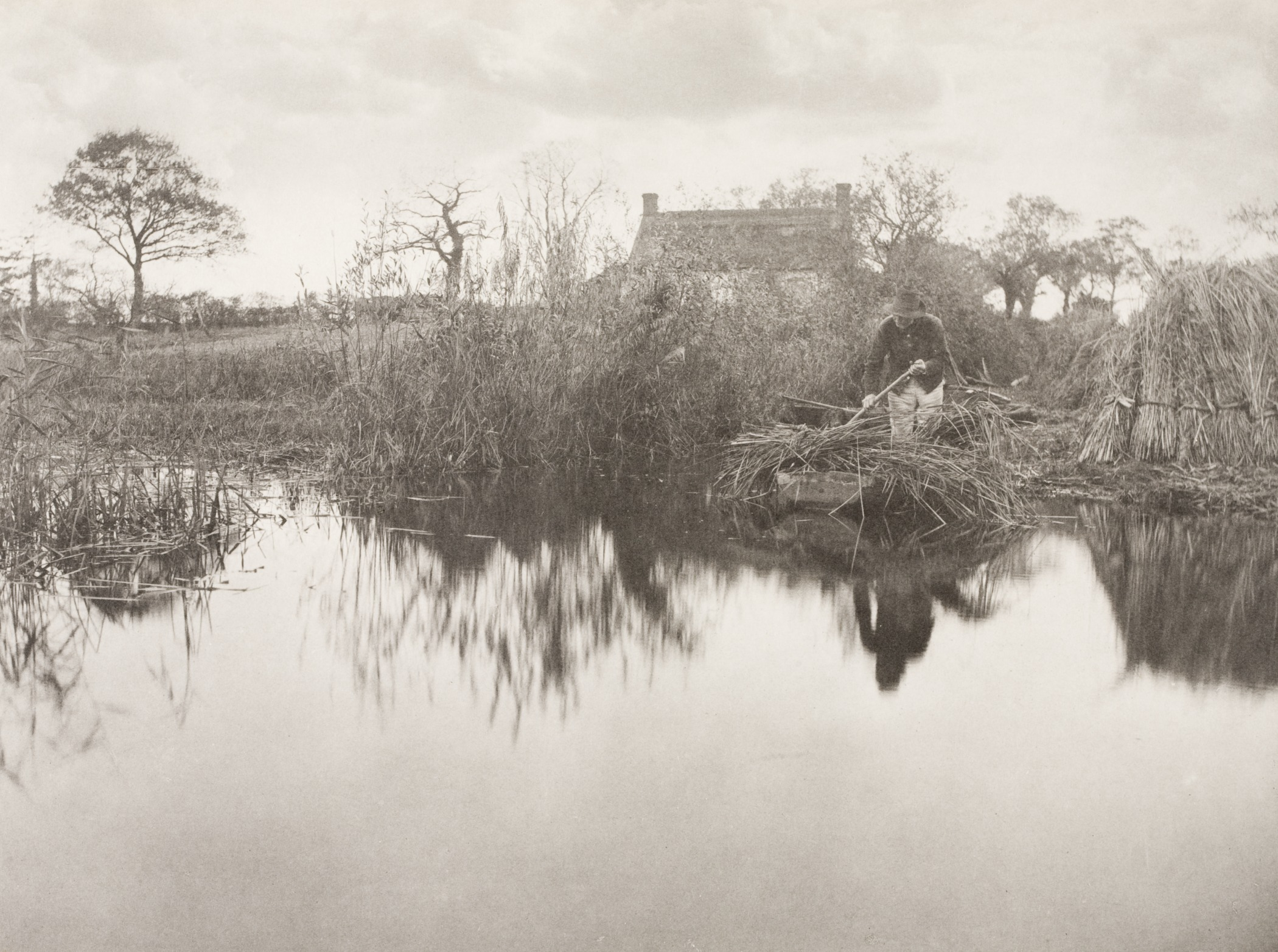
Quanting the Gladdon

=== Propulsion ===
The quanter stands at the front of the barge or, for a punt, normally on the rear deck. The angle at which the quant is held depends on the depth of the water and the desired speed of travel. A steeper angle is required for deeper water (the bottom of the quant must be able to reach the bed of the river or canal) and a shallower angle required for speed. The quanter drives the quant downward and slightly backward to push the craft forwards. On a larger boat, the quanter then walks down the side of the boat, facing aft and braced against the quant pole, the boat being propelled forward at the speed he walks. To reverse, the quant can be pushed forwards. The quant is then pulled out of the water by placing hand over hand on it and pulling upwards (as if one were climbing down a pole).

When punting, as in Oxford and Cambridge, the quanter stands stationary at the back (Oxford and Cambridge disagree on which is the rear end: decked in Cambridge and undecked in Oxford) and slides the quant into the water at an angle forwards. As the punt glides forwards the loosely held quant becomes increasingly vertical. When the quant is just past the vertical, i.e. sloping downwards from front to back of the punt, the quanter pushes on the quant to propel the punt forwards. At the end of the pushing stroke the quant is twisted with a downward roll of the wrists to break it free from the bottom, and then retrieved by being thrown forwards hand-over-hand in readiness for the next stroke. A rhythmic and smooth style is usually considered to be 'good form'.

Disaster may strike if the quanter loses grip on the quant while attempting to extract it from the bottom, and the quant is left 'stuck in the mud' at an increasing distance behind the punt. This is not 'good form'. It is not unknown, when the quant sticks in the mud, for an inexperienced quanter to choose to hold onto the quant rather than letting go, with the result that the quanter is left dangling from the end of the quant, and subsides slowly into the water. This, too, is considered not 'good form'.

=== Steering ===
By dragging the quant at an angle behind the barge or punt upon the water, the craft can be made to turn. The craft will slow on the side on which the quant is in the water, so the craft will move in that direction. The greater the angle made between the quant and the barge or punt, the greater the turning angle. This effect can be enhanced (greater turning force), by pushing the quant forward through the water on the desired direction side of the craft.

Alternatively, propelling the boat with the quant placed such that there is an angle between the direction of motion and the line of the quant itself will push the rear of the craft away from the planted end of the quant, and so enable changes of direction. This method allows for corrections and steering to be accomplished without significantly slowing the craft, although it generally requires a greater degree of skill.
