= Albion (wherry) =

Sailing boat built in 1898

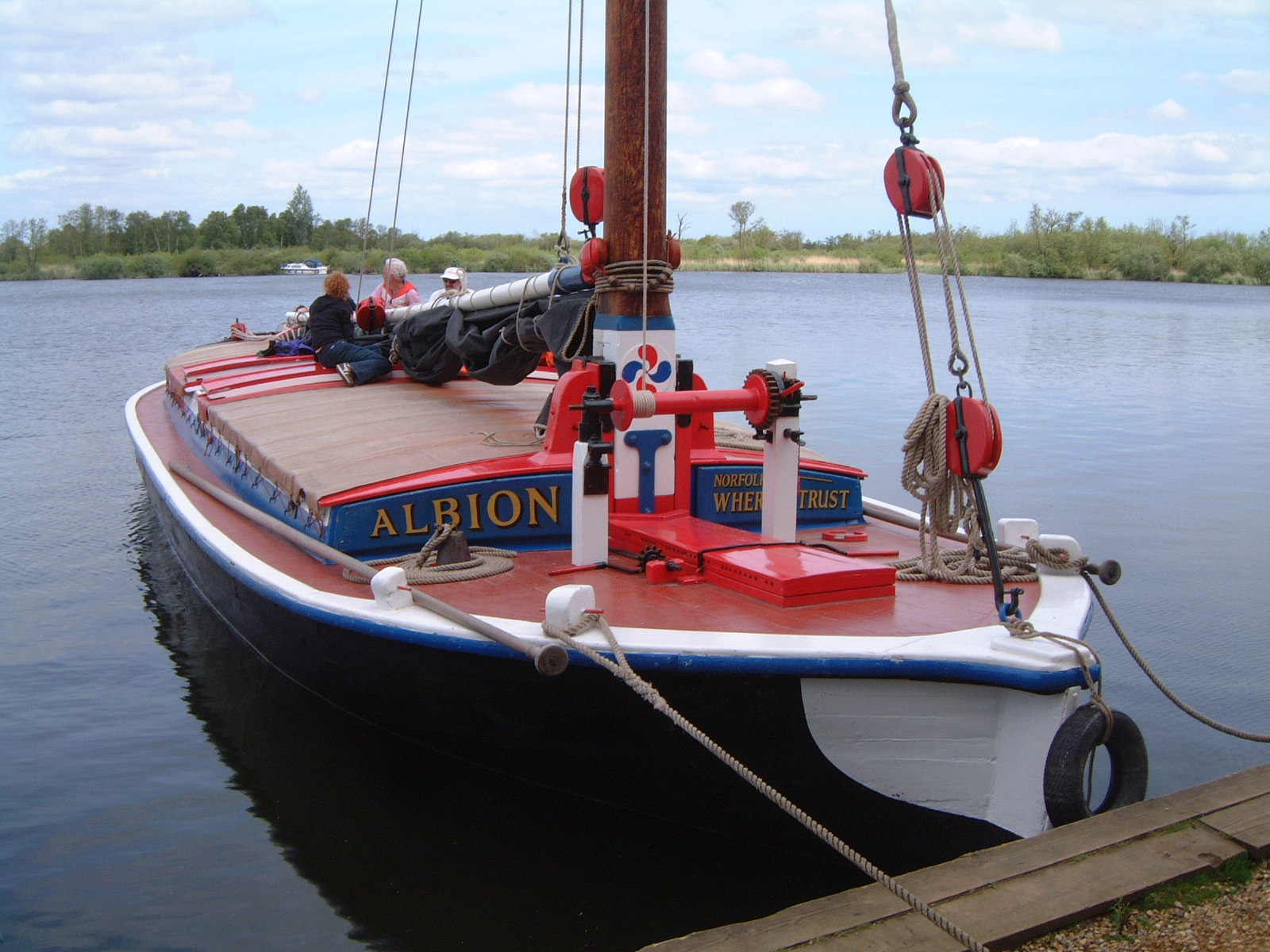
- Albion on charter at Ranworth Broad, 20 May 2002.

History

United Kingdom
- Name: Albion (1898–1931); Plane (1931–49); Albion (since 1949)
- Owner: W D & A E Walker (1898–1931); General Steam Navigation Co (1931–49); Norfolk Wherry Trust (since 1949)
- Builder: W Brighton
- Cost: £455
- Launched: October 1898
- Home port: Bungay (1898–1931); Ludham (since 1981)
- Identification: United Kingdom Official Number 148735
- Status: Active, as of 2010

General characteristics
- Class & type: Norfolk Wherry
- Tonnage: 22.78 GRT
- Length: 65 ft 0 in (19.81 m)
- Beam: 15 ft 0 in (4.57 m)
- Height: 42 ft 0 in (12.80 m)
- Draught: 4 ft 6 in (1.37 m)
- Propulsion: Sail, 1,200 square feet (110 m^{2})
- Sail plan: Gaff-rigged
- Speed: 3 to 5 knots (5.6 to 9.3 km/h; 3.5 to 5.8 mph) (typical); 7 to 8 knots (13 to 15 km/h; 8.1 to 9.2 mph) (maximum)
- Capacity: 36 long tons (37 t) cargo
- Complement: 1 man, 1 boy
- Notes: Only carvel-built Norfolk wherry.

Albion is a Norfolk wherry. Built in 1898, she served as a trading vessel and then as a lighter, until being acquired by the Norfolk Wherry Trust for restoration and preservation in 1949. Since 1981 she has been moored at the Norfolk Wherry Trust wherry base at Womack Water near Ludham. She is listed on the register of National Historic Ships in the United Kingdom as part of the National Historic Fleet.

== Appearance ==
Albion's construction is unique amongst Norfolk trading wherries as she is carvel built (smooth hulled), whereas all others are clinker built. Apart from her hull construction, her general appearance follows that of a typical trading wherry with a forward counterbalanced mast of Oregon pine, a large cargo hold in the centre of the hull and crew quarters aft. She is steered from a small aft well by rudder and tiller.

Albion's registered tonnage is 22.78 and her length overall is 65 ft (20 m) with a 58 ft (18 m) hull. Her beam is 15 ft (4.6 m) and she draws 4 ft 6 in (1.37 m). Her mast is 42 feet (12.80 m) tall. Her sail area is 1,200 square feet (110 m^{2}).

== History ==
Albion was built by William 'Billy' Brighton at his shipyard on Lake Lothing between Oulton Broad and Lowestoft for W.D. and A.E. Walker, a firm of Bungay maltsters. She cost £455 to build and was launched in October 1898 in a livery of green with a brown oxide top. Her crew consisted a man and a boy.

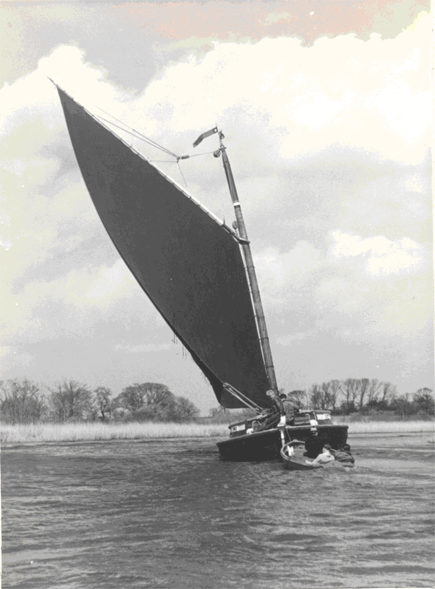
Albion running in Old Staithe Reach on 21 April 1963

Albion was nearly lost in January 1929 when she sank near Great Yarmouth Bridge, but was raised 3 days later. She had a further mishap in 1931 when she lost her mast but had it replaced with that of the wherry Sirius.

Shortly afterwards she was bought by the General Steam Navigation Company, which changed her name to Plane and appointed a new master, George Farrow, who remained with her until the Second World War when she was stripped down and used as a lighter. Albion was allocated the United Kingdom Official Number 148735.

Although designed to carry 36 long tons (37 t) of cargo, she is recorded as carrying 41 long tons (42 t) of cargo on one occasion. In normal service, Albion made 3 to 5 knots (5.6 to 9.3 km/h; 3.5 to 5.8 mph), with 7 to 8 knots (13 to 15 km/h; 8.1 to 9.2 mph) being considered her normal maximum. It is rumored that she achieved 9 to 10 knots (17 to 19 km/h; 10 to 12 mph) in a race on Breydon Water when her mast snapped.

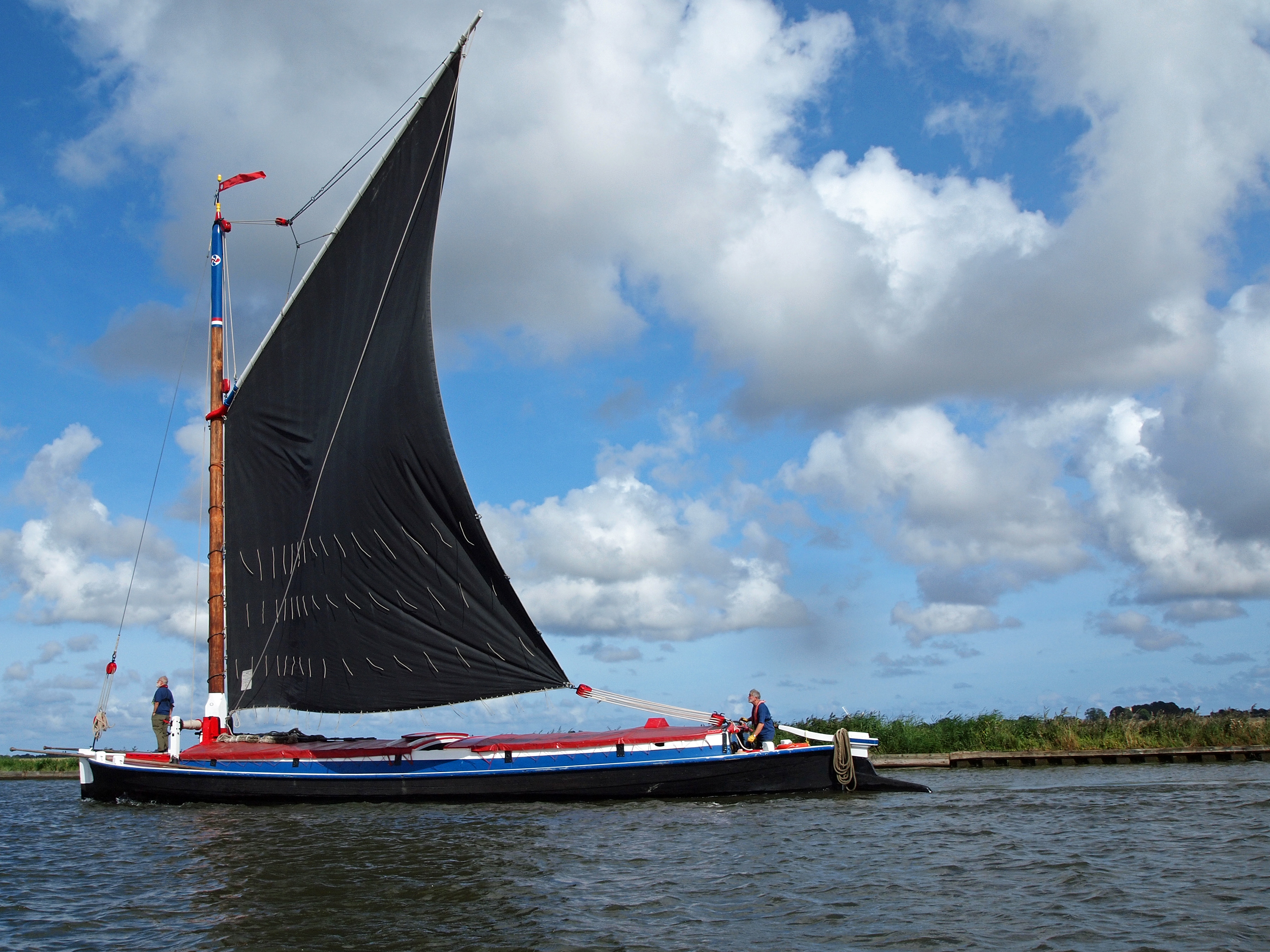
Albion near Ludham

In 1949 she was acquired by the then newly formed Norfolk Wherry Trust which renamed her Albion, restored her and operated her full-time as a trading wherry until 1953 when, unable to support a full-time crew, Albion's hold was swept out and she spent summers as a crewed charter accommodating groups of young people sleeping in hammocks. She continued to ply as a trading wherry. However, after sinking a further two times, it was recognised that this was economically unsustainable and in 1961 the Trust decided that Albion would never carry 'dirty' cargo again.

In 2010, Albion was awarded the runner-up position by National Historic Ships in its annual Flagship competition. An award of £250 was made to the Norfolk Wherry Trust in recognition of this. Albion flew a pennant during the 2010 season denoting this achievement.

Albion's Known Masters
Name	Dates
Jimmy Lacey	1898–1900
Jack Powley	1900–c1920
George Farrow	1931–c1940
