= Carrow Works =

Former factory in Norwich, England

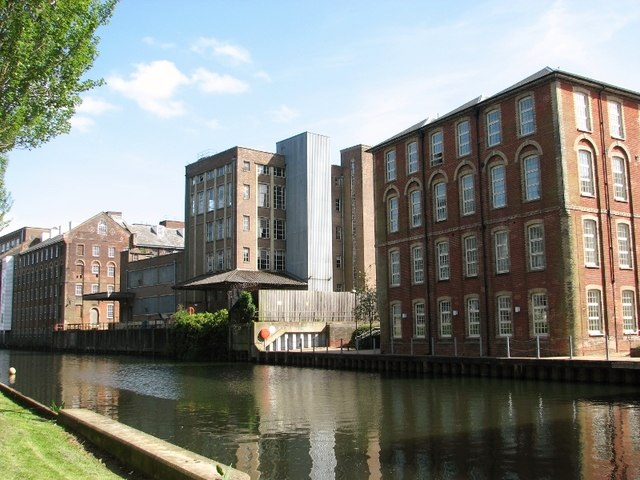
- The Works next to the River Wensum
- Built: 1854-1856
- Coordinates: 52.62°N 1.31°E
- Products: Mustard, soft drinks, modular buildings
- Area: 40 acres (16 ha)

Carrow Works is a former factory site in Norwich, England previously owned by condiment manufacturer Colman's. The site covers 40 acres, and several of the buildings within its bounds are Grade II listed including Carrow House. The house's Grade II* listed conservatory, as well as the Grade I listed Carrow Abbey, also exist within its bounds. In production for 165 years, the site has had an historic impact on the industry and character of Norwich.

== Background ==
In 1146, Stephen, King of England granted land in Carrow (then known as Carhowe) to the nuns of the Church of St Mary and St John for the founding of a Benedictine priory. At a point between 1503 and 1535, Isobell Wygun, its penultimate prioress, built a new house for herself, substantially reworking the priory's west range. However, after the dissolution of the monasteries, the priory largely fell into ruin, apart from the prioress' house which had been given to Sir John Shelton by Henry VIII. It came to be known as Carrow Abbey, changing ownership several times before being acquired by a Norwich surgeon, Philip Martineau, in 1811.

== History ==
=== Use by J & J Colman Ltd ===
Land to the north of the Carrow Abbey estate was purchased from the Norfolk Railway Company by J & J Colman Ltd in 1850, and the business began to move from its former mill at Stoke Holy Cross. Jeremiah James Colman, the son of the business' founder Jeremiah Colman, was influential in the expansion of the business here following his joining of the partnership in 1851. At one point from 1854 to 1856 a mustard mill was erected at the site beginning an official movement onto the site; it is now demolished. Later, flour and starch mills, granaries, warehouses and workshops, and a counting house in 1857, were built. JJ Colman finished building a family home on the site in 1861, and in 1862 the move from the Stoke mill was fully finished.

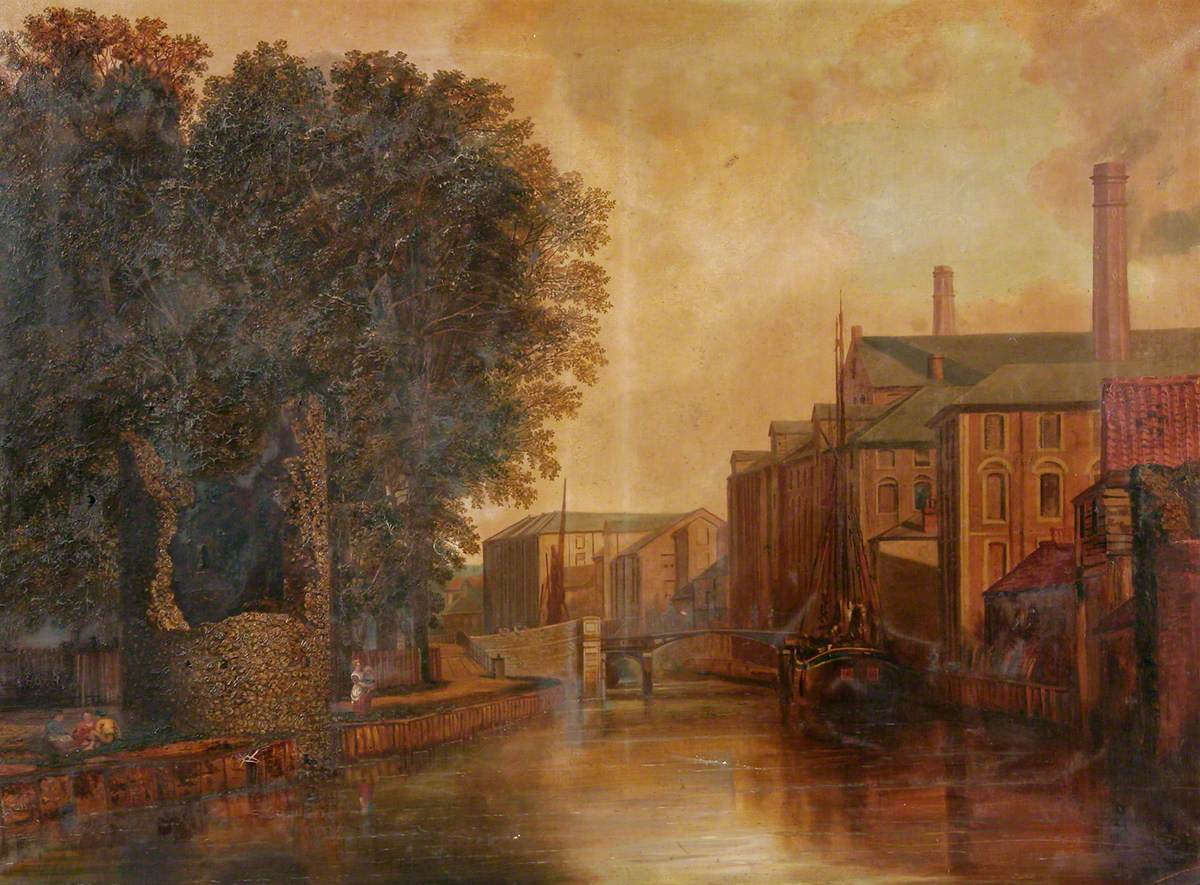
A painting of Carrow Works by the River Wensum, circa 1870

J & J Colman Ltd acquired further adjacent land in the late 19th century, including the Carrow estate from the Martineau family, and more factory buildings were built, with several being rebuilt after a large fire in 1881. Also in the late 19th century, Carrow Works gained a local football team of the same name. The roof of one of the blocks was replaced after being damaged during World War II, and metal bridges and chutes were added between the buildings during the 20th century. All four blocks that made up the factory seemingly closed during the 1990s.

=== Closures and redevelopment plans ===
On 15 December 2017, co-owner of the site Britvic confirmed that it would close its operations at the Norwich factory, where it produced Robinsons and Fruit Shoot drinks, instead moving to Rugby, east London and Leeds. At the time, Britvic employed 249 people at the site. Unilever, which owns Colman's, had already stated that it may close its own operations if Britvic left the site. Modular building construction company Beattie Passive then moved into the site, though the company filed a notice of administration in March 2024 and halted production.

In January 2018 Unilever also announced it would end Colman's production in the factory, which at the time employed 113 people, instead moving to factories in Burton-on-Trent and Germany; this was further confirmed in March of that year. On 24 July 2019 the final jars of mustard were produced by the factory; their best before dates were replaced with "Norwich's Last. By Its Finest. July 24th 2019", and they were gifted to the employees at the site. On 22 May 2020, the site closed, ending over 160 years of production by Colman's in the city.

In August 2023, details were revealed about a new housing development proposed for the site that would have included the building of 1,859 properties, including 143 houses plus business and community space. The plans were expected to cost £460 million. These plans were scrapped in March 2024 by Norwich City Council, which cited a breakdown in communications with developers Fuel Properties and concerns over the project's environmental impact. In 2026, the site was acquired by Homes England.

== Carrow House ==
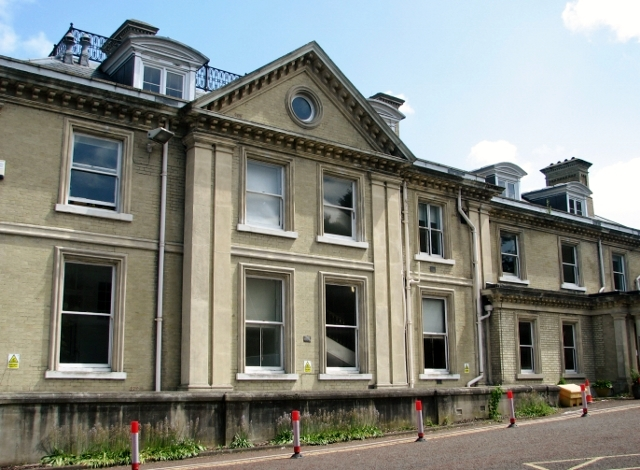
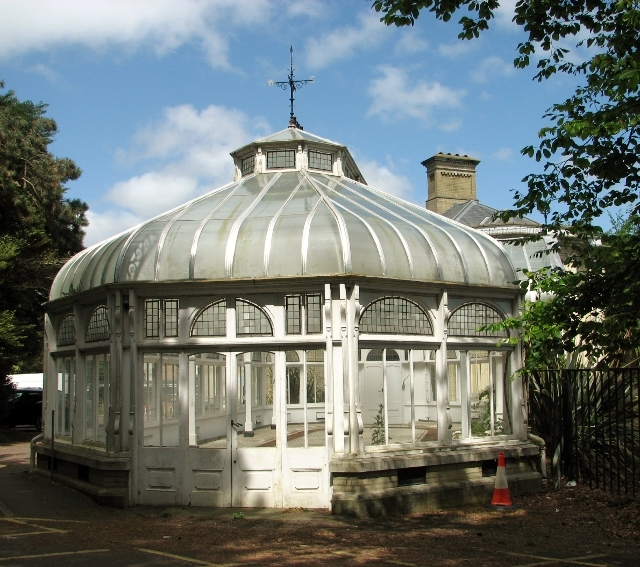
Carrow House (left) and its adjoining Boulton & Paul conservatory (right)

Carrow House was the Victorian residence of the Colman family during their occupation of the factory site. It is a large two-storey Italianate style villa constructed of gault brick in Flemish bond with stone dressings and a slate roof, with an attic and basement. It is positioned on a raised but sloping site with a long, rectangular plan. On the south-west corner, the site has an adjoining conservatory made from hardwood and cast iron.

The house was extensively rebuilt under Jeremiah James Coleman in 1860 and 1861, with correspondence suggesting that this had involvement from architect Edward Boardman and local ironmonger Barnard, Bishop & Barnards. Internal wood carving during this development was the work of James Minns. It became the Colemans' family home. The site is raised which would have allowed him to see his business to the north-east. In 1895, the building was given an extension and a conservatory by Boulton & Paul Ltd, and in 1908 a small walled garden with a fountain and seating area were added to the conservatory's south-east. The house was converted into offices for Coleman business use in 1922, and at some point after 1928 two small single-storey extensions were built on each side of the west front main entrance. New Carrow House, a five-storey office block, was built to the north and connected to Carrow House in 1959.

The house became a Grade II listed building in 1986, and the conservatory was Grade II* listed in 2021. City council bought Carrow House from Norfolk County Council for over £2 million in 2021 and invested an extra £1.4 million in its refurbishment. The group of charities and social enterprises known as Norwich Unity Hub took on management of the house in late 2024. In November 2025, the Hub's charities sought permission to host performances of plays, dance, live music and film screenings at the house; the city council granted them permission to sell alcohol and play live music at the venue.
