= Cervia (disambiguation) =

Cervia is a seaside resort town in the province of Ravenna, Italy.

Cervia or Cervià may also refer to:

- Cervià de les Garrigues, a village in Catalonia, Spain
- Cervià de Ter, a village in Catalonia, Spain
- Gerontius of Cervia (died 509), a saint and first bishop of Cervia
- Cervia Air Base, an Italian air force station near Cervia
- Cervia gas field, an offshore gas field in the Adriatic Sea
- ST Cervia, a historic steam tug, preserved in Ramsgate, England

== See also ==
- Servia (disambiguation)
