= List of Empire ships (R) =

Type of British ship in World War II

== Suffix beginning with R ==
=== Empire Rabaul ===
Empire Rabaul was a 7,307 Gross register tonnage (GRT) cargo ship which was built by John Readhead & Sons Ltd, South Shields. Launched on 27 November 1944 and completed in February 1945. Sold in 1947 to B J Sutherland & Co Ltd, Newcastle upon Tyne and renamed Dumfries. Sold in 1953 to Chine Shipping Co Ltd and renamed Charles Dickens. Operated under the management of Anglo-Danubian Transport Co Ltd, London. Sold in 1956 to the Yugoslavian Government and renamed Pohorje. Arrived on 21 April 1967 at Trieste, Italy for scrapping.

=== Empire Race ===
Empire Race was a 244 GRT tug which was built by Henry Scarr Ltd, Hessle. Launched on 21 November 1944 and completed in June 1942. Sold in 1962 to Società di Navigazione Capiece, Italy and renamed Capo d'Orlando.

=== Empire Rain ===
Empire Rain was a 7,290 GRT cargo ship which was built by John Readhead & Sons Ltd, South Shields. Launched on 30 October 1940 and completed in January 1941. Sold in 1945 to Thompson Steam Shipping Co Ltd, London, and renamed Amersham. Operated under the management of Clan Line Ltd. Sold in 1952 to Malabar Steamship Co Ltd, Bombay and renamed Janeta. Scrapped in March 1963 in Bombay.

=== Empire Rainbow ===
Empire Rainbow was a 6,942 GRT CAM ship which was built by Greenock Dockyard Co Ltd, Greenock. Launched on 27 December 1940 and completed in May 1941. Torpedoed on 26 July 1942 and sunk by U-607 at 47°08′N 42°57′W while a member of Convoy ON 113.

=== Empire Raja ===
Empire Raja was a 6,224 GRT cargo ship which was built by Joh. C. Tecklenborg AG, Wesermünde. Completed in 1922 as Wildenfels for DDG Hansa, Bremen. Scuttled on 25 August 1941 at Bandar Shapur, Iraq. Salvaged and seized as a war prize. To MoWT and renamed Empire Raja. Sold in 1951 to Wheelock, Marden & Co, Hong Kong and renamed Lansdowne. Sold in 1951 to Dai-Ichi Kisen KK, Japan, and renamed Liverpool Maru. Scrapped in November 1960 at Osaka, Japan.

=== Empire Raleigh ===
Empire Raleigh was a 7,240 GRT cargo ship which was built by William Doxford & Sons Ltd, Sunderland. Launched on 12 June 1941 and completed in October 1941. Allocated in 1942 to the Dutch Government and renamed Vermeer. Sold in 1946 to Stoomscheep Maatschappij Wijklijn NV and renamed Zonnewijk. Operated under the management of Erhardt & Dekkers, Rotterdam. Sold in 1961 to Compagnia Navigazione de Egeo, Panama and renamed Antonakis. Operated under the management of Lemos & Pateras Ltd. Ran aground on 6 December 1961 at Cape Spartel, Morocco 35°43′N 05°57′W and broke in two. Declared a total loss.

=== Empire Rancher ===
Empire Rancher was a 332 GRT collier which was built by J Harker Ltd, Knottingley. Launched on 2 January 1943 and completed in June 1943. Sold in 1947 to Anglo-Danubian Transport Co Ltd, London and renamed Shelley. Sold in 1948 to Coppack Brothers & Co, Hull. Stranded on 6 June 1965 in Strangford Lough. Refloated and taken in tow but sank on 8 June in Belfast Lough.

=== Empire Ranger ===
Empire Ranger was a 7,008 GRT cargo ship which was built by Lithgows Ltd, Port Glasgow. Launched on 3 December 1941 and was completed in February 1942. Bombed on 28 March 1942 by Junkers Ju 88 aircraft and sunk at 72°10′N 30°00′E while a member of Convoy PQ 13. Crew member, Alfred Minchin was taken prisoner by a German destroyer and became a member of the Waffen-SS British Free Corps, holding the rank of Sturmmann. He was 'convicted at Central Criminal Court on 5 February 1946 of conspiring to assist the enemy and sentenced to 7 years of penal servitude.

=== Empire Rangoon ===
Empire Rangoon was a 7,028 GRT cargo ship which was built by Harland & Wolff Ltd, Belfast. Launched on 25 January 1944 and completed in May 1944. Sold in 1947 to Reardon Smith Line Ltd and renamed Homer City. Operated under the management of Sir William Reardon Smith & Sons Ltd. Sold in 1966 to Grosvenor Shipping Co Ltd, London, and renamed Grosvenor Mariner. Operated under the management of Mollers Ltd, Hong Kong. Sold in 1966 to Tat On Shipping & Enterprise Co Ltd, Hong Kong, and renamed Red Sea. Operated under the management of Yick Fung Shipping & Enterprise Co Ltd, Hong Kong. On 17 August 1971 she was driven aground at Lanatu Island, Hong Kong during Typhoon Rose. Refloated but scrapped in September 1971 at Hong Kong.

=== Empire Rani ===
Empire Rani was a 7,575 GRT cargo ship which was built by Joh. C. Tecklenborg AG, Wesermünde. Completed in 1921 as Marienfels for Hansa Line, Bremen. Captured on 25 August 1941 at Bandar Shapur, Iran. To MoWT and renamed Empire Rani. Sold in 1950 to San Giorgio del Porto, Italy, and renamed Karachi. Scrapped in June 1959 at Osaka, Japan.

=== Empire Ransom ===
Empire Ransom was a 2,905 GRT cargo ship which was built by William Gray & Co Ltd, West Hartlepool. Launched on 31 August 1943 and completed in November 1943. Sold in 1946 to Kelvin Shipping Co Ltd and renamed Baron Elibank. Operated under the management of H Hogarth & Sons Ltd. Sold in 1959 to Empros Shipping Co Ltd, Greece, and renamed Armenistis. Arrived on 6 July 1971 at Tamise, Belgium for scrapping.

=== Empire Rapier ===
Empire Rapier was a 7,177 GRT (11,650 tons displacement) Type C1-S-AY1 cargo ship which was built by Consolidated Steel Corp, Wilmington, California. Laid down as Cape Turner but completed in December 1943 as Empire Rapier for MoWT. To United States Maritime Commission (USMC) in 1948 and renamed Cape Turner. Renamed Empire Rapier at an unknown date. Arrived on 5 January 1966 at Kearney, New Jersey for scrapping.

=== Empire Raven ===
Empire Raven was a 6,100 GRT (9,400 DWT) refrigerated cargo ship which was built by Moore Shipbuilding Co, Oakland, California. Completed in November 1918 as Oskawa for the United States Shipping Board (USSB). To MoWT in 1942 and renamed Empire Raven. Sold in 1948 to South Georgia Co Ltd and renamed Southern Raven. Operated under the management of Christian Salvesen & Co Ltd, Leith. Scrapped in November 1952 at Port Glasgow. Louis Adamic wrote an account of life on the ship in 1922 in his Dynamite: The Story of Class Violence in America (published in 1931), which in turn inspired Bertold Brecht's poem "Abbau des Schiffes Oskawa durch die Mannschaft", published in his 1939 collection Svendborger Gedichte.

=== Empire Rawlinson ===
Empire Rawlinson was a 9,912 GRT cargo liner which was built by Lithgows Ltd, Port Glasgow. Launched on 22 June 1944 and completed in November 1944. Allocated in 1946 to the French Government and renamed Monkay. Sold in 1950 to Compagnie des Messageries Maritimes, France. Sold in 1959 to Compagnia Marittima Marmara SA, Panama and renamed Dimitrios. Sold in 1969 to S A Wisdom Ltda, Panama, and renamed Tropero. Operated under the management of A Bottacchi SA, Argentina. Arrived on 1 February 1972 at Campan, Argentina for scrapping.

=== Empire Ray ===
Empire Ray was a 6,919 GRT CAM ship which was built by Greenock Dockyard Co Ltd, Greenock. Launched on 25 March 1941 and completed in June 1941. Sold in 1945 to King Line Ltd and renamed King Alfred. Arrived on 16 March 1963 at Hamburg, West Germany for scrapping.

=== Empire Raymond ===
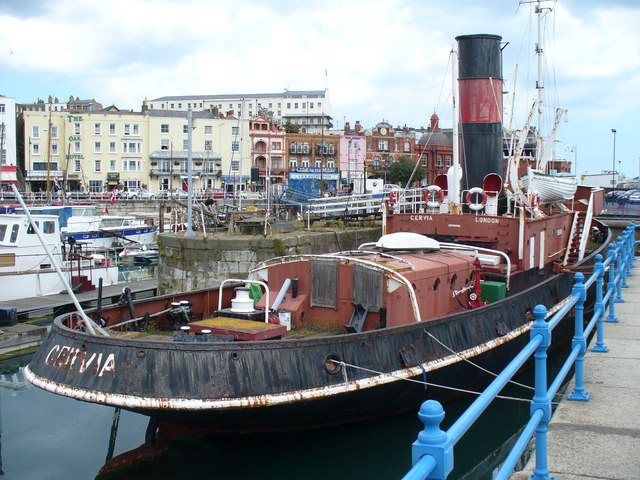
ST Cervia at Ramsgate

Empire Raymond is a 235 GRT tug which was built by A Hall & Co Ltd, Aberdeen. Launched on 21 January 1946 and completed in May 1946. Sold in 1947 to William Watkins Ltd and renamed Cervia. Foundered on 26 October 1954 at Tilbury, Essex while assisting SS Arcadia. Raised on 28 October and beached. Repaired at Ramsgate, Kent and re-entered service. To Medway Maritime Museum in 1972 and then International Towing Ltd, Sittingbourne, Kent in 1973. To East Kent Maritime Museum in 1984 and preserved in William Watkins Ltd livery.

=== Empire Razorbill ===
Empire Razorbill was a 5,117 GRT (7,500 DWT) cargo ship which was built by American International Shipbuilding, Hog Island, Pennsylvania. Completed in 1920 as Conness Peak for USSB. Sold to Pioneer Steamship Corp, New York in 1920. Sold to Lykes Brothers-Ripley Steamship Co Inc in 1933. Sold in 1938 to Wisconsin Steamship Co and renamed Erica Reed. Sold in 1939 to American Coast Line Inc and renamed Eastern Trader. To MoWT in 1940 and renamed Empire Razorbill. Sold in 1946 to Williamson & Co Ltd, Hong Kong. Sold in 1947 to Xilas Brothers, Greece and renamed M Xilas. Caught fire on 4 June 1947 at Ko Sichang, Thailand, beached and abandoned. Sank on 13 July 1947.

=== Empire Reaper ===
Empire Reaper was a 322 GRT collier which was built by J Harker Ltd, Knottingley. Launched on 17 October 1942 and completed in April 1943. Sold in 1947 to Anglo-Danubian Transport Co Ltd, London and renamed Browning. Sold in 1949 to Kerton Shipping Co Ltd and renamed Moreton Corbet. Sold in 1953 to Fowey Harbour Commissioners, Fowey, Cornwall and renamed Lerryn. Sold in 1964 to Seabourne Aggregate Co Ltd, Southampton. Converted to a sand carrier and renamed Pen Adur. Sold in 1969 to South Coast Shipping Co Ltd, Southampton, and renamed Sand Wren. Sold in 1973 to Bowen & Caine, Southampton, and renamed Margaret Smith. Capsized on 28 June 1978 at Cowes, Isle of Wight. Towed to a position off Yarmouth but sank at 52°42′N 01°28′W.

=== Empire Record ===
Empire Record was a 2,902 GRT cargo ship which was built by William Gray & Co Ltd, West Hartlepool. Launched on 24 October 1942 and completed in December 1942. Sold in 1948 to Stanhope Steamship Co Ltd and renamed Stanway. Sold in 1951 to Williamson Shipping Co Ltd and renamed Yorkbrook. Operated under the management of Comben, Longstaff & Co Ltd. Sold in 1954 to I Jansen, Norway, and renamed Elisabeth Jansen. Sold in 1959 to Marine Venture Corp, New York, and renamed Celia B. Sold in 1963 to Prymo Meltemi Compagnia Navigazione SA, Panama and renamed Saint Mary. Sold in 1964 to Angelmar Shipping Co Ltd, Panama, and renamed Sea Maid. On 7 January 1965, she lost her propeller and suffered engine damage northeast of Bonaire, Netherlands Antilles. Towed to Willemstad and abandoned as a constructive total loss. Sold for scrapping at Curaçao, but resold and towed to Rotterdam. Scrapped in March 1969 at Bilbao, Spain.

=== Empire Redshank ===
Empire Redshank was a 6,615 GRT (9,600 DWT) cargo ship which was built by Federal Shipbuilding Co, Kearney, New Jersey. Completed in April 1919 as Braddock for USSB. To MoWT in 1941 and renamed Empire Redshank. Bombed on 31 January 1942 and damaged north of the Shetland Islands (63°24′N 02°24′W). Torpedoed on 22 February 1943 and sunk by U-606 while a member of Convoy ON 166. Abandoned and then sunk by HMCS Trillium.

=== Empire Regent ===
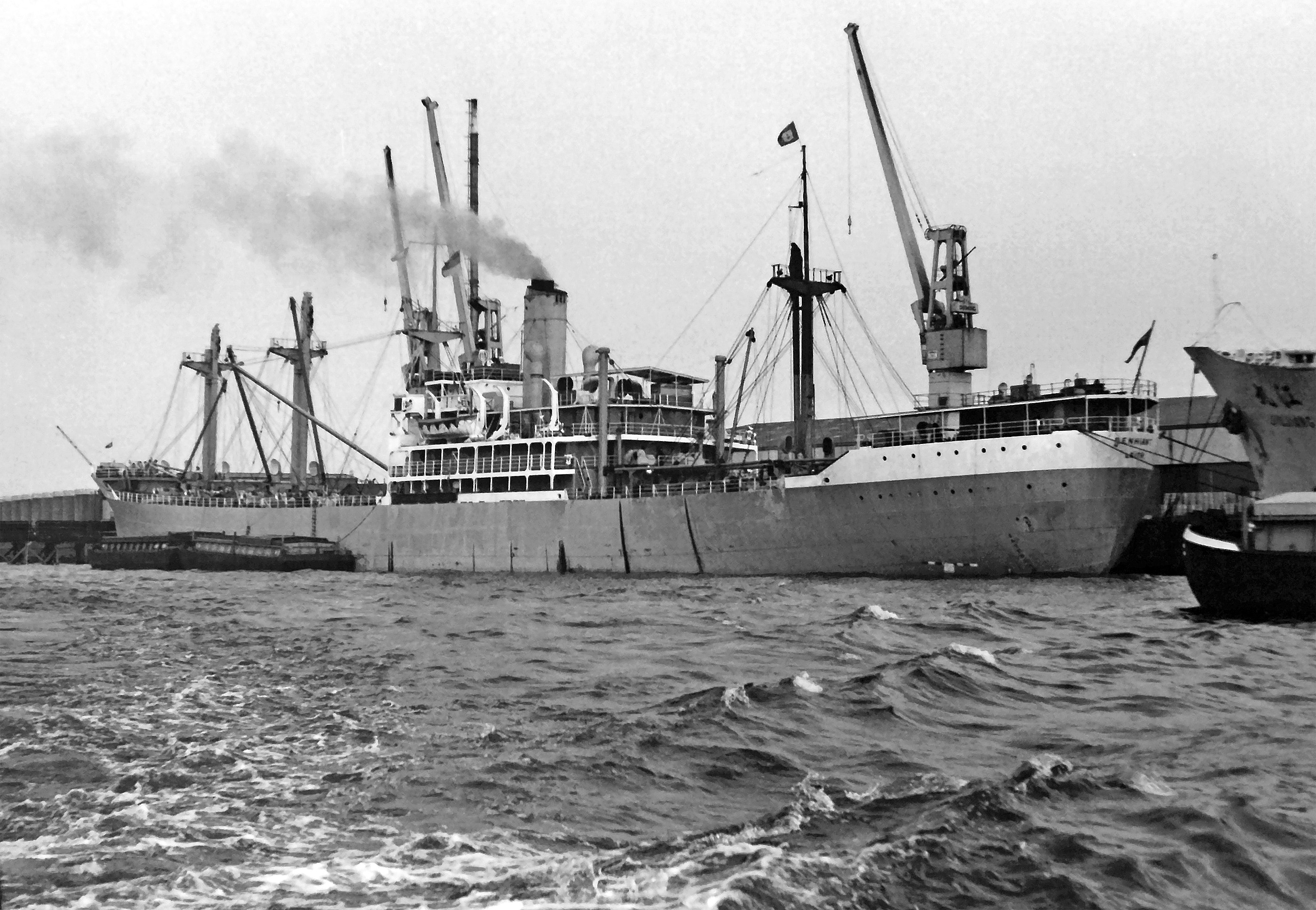
Benhiant

Empire Regent was a 9,904 GRT cargo liner which was built by Furness Shipbuilding Co Ltd, Haverton Hill-on-Tees. Launched on 17 July 1943 and completed in November 1943. Sold in 1946 to Rio Cape Line Ltd and renamed Black Prince. Operated under the management of Furness, Withy & Co Ltd. Chartered in 1949 by Shaw, Savill & Albion Co Ltd and renamed Zealandic. Sold in 1952 to Canadian Pacific Steamships Ltd and renamed Beaverlodge. Sold in 1960 to Ben Line Steamers Ltd and renamed Benhiant. Sold in 1970 to Witty Compagnia Navigazione SA, Cyprus and renamed Venus. Operated under the management of Troodos Shipping & Trading Ltd, London. Arrived on 16 July 1971 at Kaohsiung, Taiwan for scrapping.

=== Empire Reindeer ===
Empire Reindeer was a 6,259 GRT (9,600 DWT) cargo ship which was built by the Federal Shipbuilding and Drydock Company, Kearney, New Jersey. Completed as Clarion for USSB. To MoWT in 1941 and renamed Empire Reindeer. Torpedoed on 10 August 1942 and sunk by U-660 at 57°00′N 22°30′W while a member of Convoy SC 94.

=== Empire Rennie ===
Empire Rennie was a 6,626 GRT cargo ship which was built by C Connell & Co Ltd, Glasgow. Launched on 7 October 1941 and completed in December 1941. Allocated in 1942 to the Dutch Government and renamed Frans Hals. Sold in 1946 to Van Nievelt, Goudriaan Stoomscheeps Maatschappij NV, Rotterdam and renamed Alchiba. Sold in 1956 to DDG Hansa, Bremen and renamed Rheinfels. Sold in 1968 to Permataris Shipping Co Ltd, Cyprus, and renamed Permataris. On 6 June 1975 she suffered an engine room fire east of Malta (36°45′N 16°25′E). Abandoned but later reboarded. Arrived on 12 June at Augusta, Sicily and laid up. To Piraeus, Greece, arriving on 11 July and laid up. Scrapped in February 1979 at Piraeus.

=== Empire Reserve ===
Empire Reserve was a 5,693 GRT tanker which was built by Swan, Hunter & Wigham Richardson Ltd, Newcastle upon Tyne. Completed in 1916 as Mytilus for Anglo-Saxon Petroleum Co Ltd. Requisitioned by MoWT in 1941. Arrived on 14 August 1942 at Harwich, Essex for use as an oil fuel depot. Intended to be renamed Empire Reserve but the name was not taken up. Returned to Anglo-Saxon Petroleum Co Ltd in 1946 and towed to Plaju, Indonesia. Used as a floating oil depot. Scrapped in November 1950 in Bombay.

=== Empire Resistance ===
Empire Resistance was a 1,631 GRT cargo ship which was built by Feviks Jernskibsbyg, Fevik, Norway. Completed in 1908 as Ottar. Sold in 1935 to Servizio Italo-Portoghese Anonimo di Navigazione, Genoa, Italy and renamed Libano. Seized in June 1940 at Gibraltar. To MoWT and renamed Empire Resistance. Sold in 1946 to Resistance Shipping Co, London, and renamed Resistance. Sold in 1949 to Giacomo Costa, Genoa and renamed Beatrice C. Sold in 1954 to Raffaele Romano, Naples and renamed Acilia. Sold in 1956 to Apostolo & Ruffini, Genoa and renamed Cilin. Scrapped in June 1959 at Savona, Italy.

=== Empire Rest ===
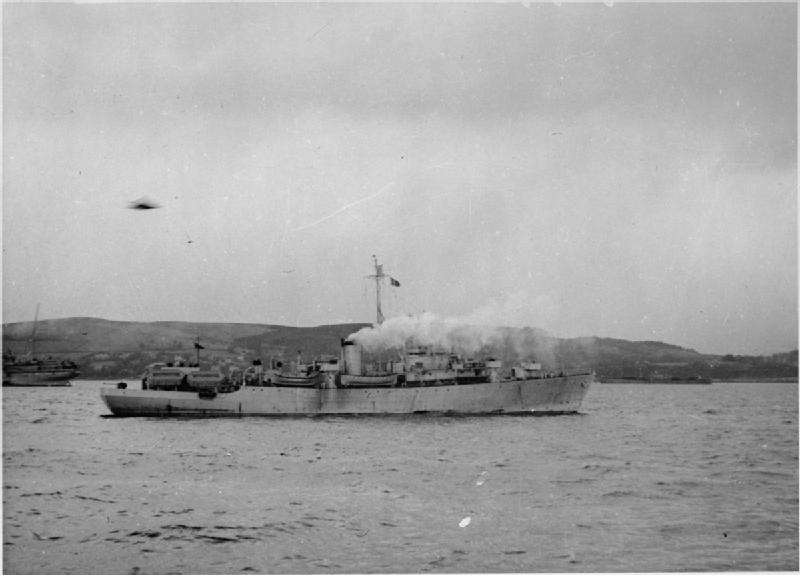
Empire Rest

Empire Rest was a 1,333 GRT convoy rescue ship which was built by Ferguson Brothers (Port Glasgow) Ltd., Port Glasgow. Launched on 19 June 1944 as HMS Rayleigh Castle for the Royal Navy. Completed in October 1944 as Empire Rest for MoWT. Laid up in July 1948 at Falmouth, Cornwall. Sold in October 1951 to Lloyds Albert Yard & Motor Boat Packet Services Ltd. Operated under the management of R A Beazley, Southampton. Arrived on 6 June 1952 at Briton Ferry, West Glamorgan for scrapping.

=== Empire Reynard ===
Empire Reynard was a 325 GRT coaster which was built by Richards Ironworks Ltd, Lowestoft. Launched on 11 July 1942 and completed in October 1942. Allocated in 1943 to the Dutch Government and renamed Westerhaven. Sold in 1946 to Société Anonyme Jean Negri, France and renamed Orsuro. Sold in 1949 to Compagnie Charentaise de Transports Maritimes, France and renamed Chassiron. Sold in 1951 to R T V Hall, Dublin and renamed Kilbride. Sold in 1972 to T Rive, Dublin, then sold in 1973 to Mrs Joyce Hercock, Hull and renamed Joyce. Scrapped in April 1974 at Hull.

=== Empire Reynolds ===
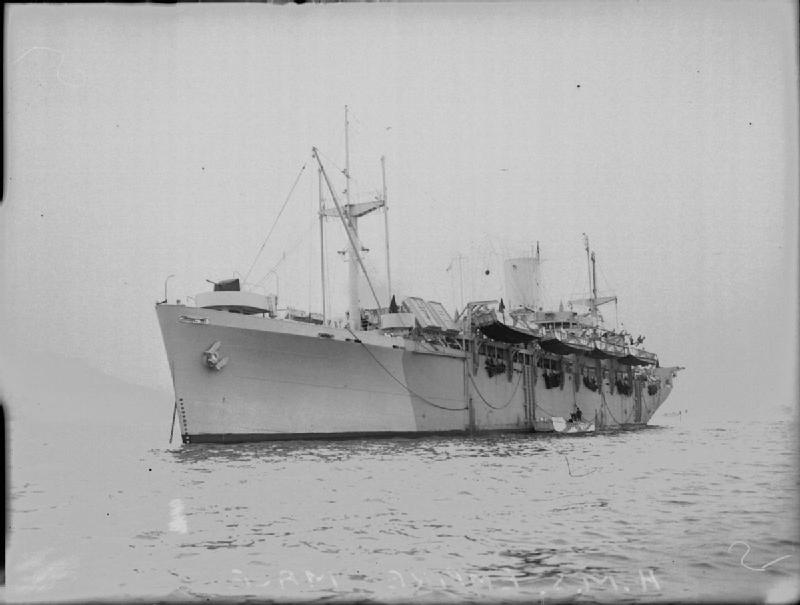
Empire Reynolds

Empire Reynolds was an 8,128 GRT tanker which was built in 1942 by Swan Hunter & Wigham Richardson Ltd, Newcastle upon Tyne. Sold to H E Moss & Co. London in 1946 and renamed Luminous. Sold in 1956 to Compagnia Sicula di Armamento Cosarma, Italy and renamed Potere. Renamed Miriella later that year. Scrapped in 1960 in Trieste.

=== Empire Rhodes ===
Empire Rhodes was a 7,050 GRT cargo ship which was built by Caledon Shipbuilding & Engineering Co Ltd, Dundee. Launched on 19 September 1941 and completed in December 1941. On 18 December 1945 her cargo of jute caught fire at Gdynia, Poland. She was scuttled in an attempt to extinguish the fire, that burnt until 3 January 1946. Towed to Kiel, Germany on 23 February 1946, then to Falmouth. Arrived on 11 April 1946 at Glasgow. Sold on 25 February 1947 to be scuttled but repaired instead. Sold to the South Georgia Co and renamed Culter. Operated under the management of Christian Salveson & Co Ltd, Leith. Sold in 1959 to M Ipar, Istanbul and renamed Virginia Ipar. Scrapped in September 1970 at Istanbul.

=== Empire Rhondda ===
Empire Rhondda was a 1,996 GRT cargo ship which was built by Schiffswerke AG, Hamburg. Completed in 1923 as Pasajes for Oldenburg-Portuguese Line, Hamburg. On 11 January 1945 she ran aground in the Skaggerak at 58°05′N 08°15′E. Salvaged and taken to Kristiansand for repairs. Seized in May 1945 at Frederikshaven, Denmark. To MoWT and renamed Empire Rhondda. To USSB in 1946 and renamed Henri Barbusse. No trace after 1955, deleted from shipping registers in 1968.

=== Empire Ribble ===
Empire Ribble was a 4,545 GRT cargo ship which was built by Lithgows Ltd, Port Glasgow. Completed in 1922 as Dunstaffinage. Sold in 1939 to F A Vinnen & Co, Bremen and renamed Magdalene Vinnen. Damaged in July 1943 during Allied air raid on Hamburg. Towed to Copenhagen for repairs and seized there in May 1945. To MoWT and renamed Empire Ribble. Chartered to the Dutch Government and renamed Osterbeek. Allocated to the Dutch Government in 1946 and sold the next year to Erhardt & Dekkers, Netherlands, renamed Winterswijk. Sold in 1954 to Peak Steamship Co, Hong Kong, and renamed Universal Trader. Sold in 1958 to Great Southern Steamship Co, Hong Kong. Scrapped in 1959 at Yokohama, Japan.

=== Empire Richmond ===
Empire Richmond was a 1,047 GRT coaster which was built by John Lewis & Sons Ltd, Aberdeen. Launched on 11 June 1945 and completed in August 1945. Sold in 1946 to Stephenson Clarke Lt and renamed Pulborough. Renamed Pulborough II in 1959, sold later that year to Ashok Line, India, and renamed Nilgiri. Arrested in 1969 at Calcutta and sold by Court Order. Scrapped in April 1970 at Calcutta.

=== Empire Rider ===
Empire Rider was a 964 GRT (1,100 DWT) coaster which was built by Scott & Sons, Bowling, West Dunbartonshire. Launched on 15 September 1943 and completed in October 1943. Sold in 1946 to O Dorey & Sons Ltd, Guernsey and renamed Rocquaine. Scrapped in 1961 at Terneuzen, Netherlands.

=== Empire Ridge ===
Empire Ridge was a 2,922 GRT ore carrier which was built by Lithgows Ltd, Port Glasgow. Launched on 7 February 1941 and completed in April 1941. Torpedoed on 19 May 1941 and sunk by U-96 at 55°08′N 10°40′W.

=== Empire Ridley ===
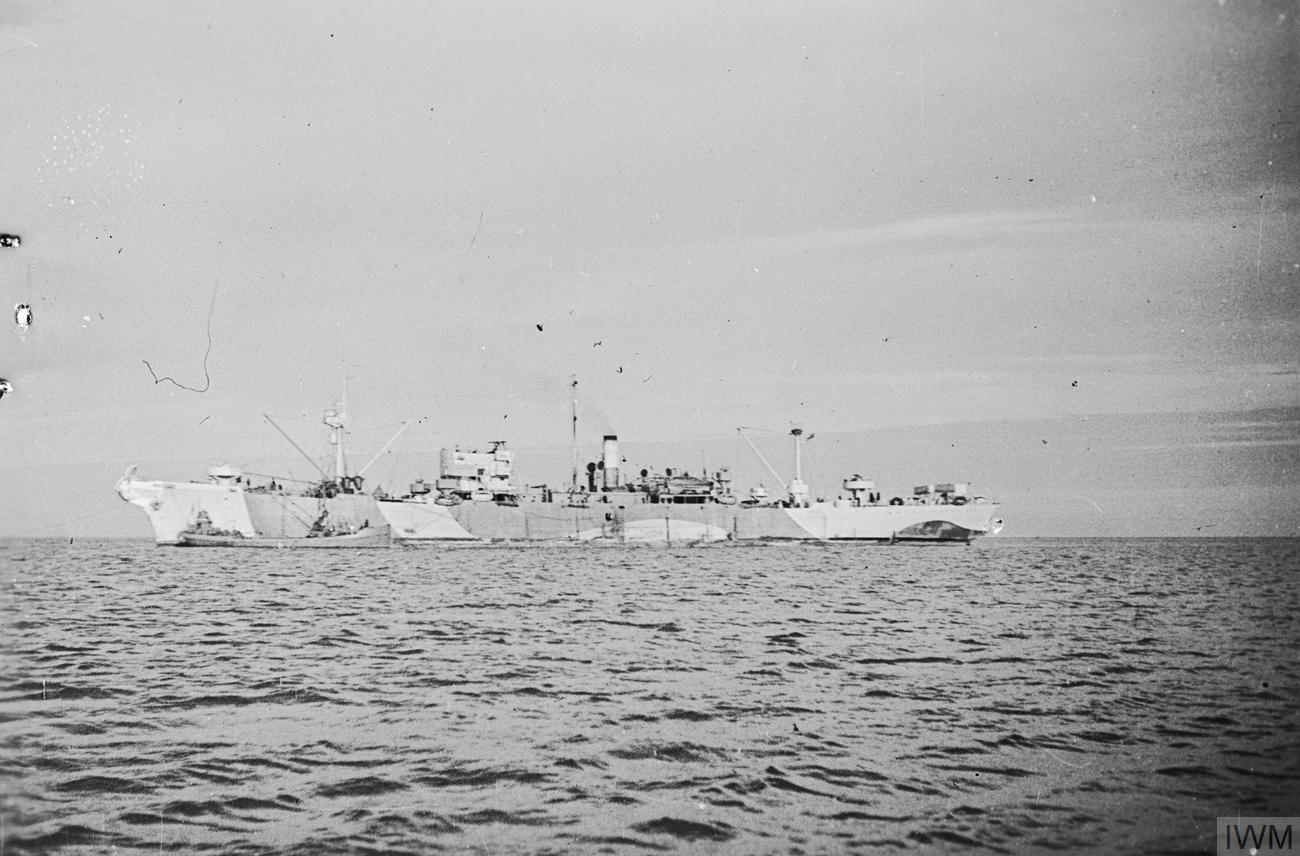
HMS Latimer

Empire Ridley was a 6,838 GRT cargo ship which was built by Lithgows Ltd, Port Glasgow. Launched on 21 August 1941 and completed in November 1941. To the Admiralty in 1943 and converted to a pipe-laying vessel. To Royal Navy as HMS Latimer. To MoWT in July 1945 and renamed Empire Ridley. Sold to Norwegian buyer in 1947, sent to Italy for conversion. Sold to Società Ligure di Armamento, Italy and renamed Acheo. Scrapped in 1964 at Sakai, Japan.

=== Empire Rita ===
Empire Rita was a 292 GRT tug which was built by Ferguson Brothers (Port Glasgow) Ltd., Port Glasgow. Launched on 15 December 1945 and completed in May 1946. To the Admiralty in 1946 and renamed Frisky in 1959. Sold in 1970 to S O Mar, Malta. Scrapped in March 1979 at Naples.

=== Empire Rival ===
Empire Rival was a 7,045 GRT cargo ship which was built by William Gray & Co Ltd, West Hartlepool. Launched on 19 June 1943 and completed in September 1943. In September, following the D-Day Normandy Landings on 6 June 1944, the Empire Rival loaded troops and armored cars belonging to the 52nd Lowland Division at London Docks. "C" Squadron was landed directly on to Sword Beach in rough sea conditions by landing craft after a passage delayed by bad weather. On 22 August 1946 a limpet mine was attached to her hull at Haifa, Palestine. A large hole was blown in her side and she was beached. Temporary repairs were made and she was towed to Alexandria, Egypt for repairs. In July 1947 she embarked some of the Jewish refugees from SS Exodus at Haifa and took them to Port de Bouc, France where they refused to disembark. Empire Rival remained in port from 29 July until 22 August, with the refugees under armed guard by the 6th Airborne Division. On 22 August, Empire Rival sailed for Hamburg where the refugees were disembarked and sent to camps throughout Europe. Sold in 1948 to R Chapman & Son, Newcastle upon Tyne and renamed Amberton. Sold in 1957 to Compagnia de Vapores Marina Ltda, Costa Rica and renamed Parmarina. Operated under the management of N & J Vlassopulos Ltd, London. Sold in 1963 to Oceania Armadora SA and reflagged to Lebanon. Remaining under Vlassopulos's management. Wrecked on 10 January 1967 off Keelung, Taiwan (25°10′N 121°43′E) after the anchor chain broke in heavy weather.

=== Empire River ===
Empire River was a 325 GRT coaster which was built by J S Watson Ltd, Gainsborough, Lincolnshire. Launched on 8 September 1941 and completed in December 1941. Allocated in 1943 to the Dutch Government and renamed Oosterhaven. Sold in 1946 to M R Couton, France, and rename Jean-Marc. Sold in 1947 to André Richard, France, and renamed Jean-Marc Richard. Sold in 1950 to Hindlea Shipping Co Ltd, Cardiff and renamed Marshlea. Sold in 1952 to F A Ashmead & Son Ltd, Bristol and renamed Peter Leigh. A new diesel engine was fitted in 1956. Sold in 1965 to Carbo Centre SA, France. Converted to a sand carrier and renamed Carbo-Centre.

=== Empire Roach ===
Empire Roach was a 716 GRT coaster which was built by Swan, Hunter & Wigham Richardson Ltd, Newcastle upon Tyne. Launched on 25 August 1942 and completed in October 1942. Operated under the management of Townsend Brothers Ltd until 1965, then Ellerman's Westcott & Laurence Line Ltd. Sold in 1968 to Progressive Trading Agency Ltd, Malta. Sold in 1970 to Cantieri Navale Giuseppe, Italy. Laid up at Augusta, Sicily awaiting conversion to a floating crane. Dismantled in 1978, her hull was used as a barge at Augusta.

=== Empire Roamer ===
Empire Roamer was a 7,030 GRT cargo ship which was built by C Connell & Co Ltd, Glasgow. Launched on 5 January 1942 as Empire Roamer. Allocated to the Polish Government and completed in March 1942 as Narwik. On 10 October 1942 she rescued over 1,000 passengers and crew from Orcades which had been torpedoed and sunk by U-172. Survivors landed in Cape Town on 12 October. Transferred in 1951 to Polish Ocean Lines, Poland, and in 1967 to Polska Żegluga Morska, Poland. Arrived on 7 March 1972 at Bilbao, Spain for scrapping.

=== Empire Robin ===
Empire Robin was a 5,756 GRT (8,800 DWT) cargo ship which was built by Columbia River Shipbuilding, Portland, Oregon. Completed as West Harshaw for USSB. To Lykes Bros-Ripley Steamship Co Inc in 1933. To MoWT in 1940 and renamed Empire Oryx. Renamed Empire Robin in 1941. Allocated in 1942 to the Dutch Government and renamed Ferdinand Bol. Collided on 30 July 1942 with Norse King and sank at 45°21′N 59°28′W.

=== Empire Rock ===
Empire Rock was a 7,064 GRT cargo ship which was built by Bartram & Sons Ltd, Sunderland. Launched on 22 April 1943 and completed in July 1943. Sold in 1946 to S G Embiricos Ltd, London and renamed Admiral Codrington. Sold in 1956 to E Szabados, Italy and renamed Sandro Primo. Sold in 1959 to D Lijnzaad Transport-en-Handel, Rotterdam and renamed Amalie B. Scrapped in August 1960 at Hamburg, West Germany.

=== Empire Roden ===
Empire Roden was a 2,837 GRT cargo ship which was built by Helsingørs Maskinbyggeri, Helsingør, Denmark. Completed in 1943 as Halsnaes but renamed Helgenaes later that year. Requisitioned by Germany in 1943, to DDG Hansa, Bremen and renamed Kronenfels. Seized in May 1945 at Copenhagen. To MoWT and renamed Empire Roden. Allocated to the United States in 1947, to USMC then sold later that year to Sword Line Inc., New York, and renamed Florida Sword. Sold in 1956 to Gecapo Maritime Navigation, Liberia and renamed Cheyenne. Sold in 1957 to Supreme Navigation Corp, Liberia, and renamed St Nicholas. Ran aground on 8 August 1958 on a reef 135 nautical miles (250 km) off Kingston, Jamaica. Salvage efforts abandoned in September 1968, declared a total loss.

=== Empire Roderick ===
Empire Roderick was a 235 GRT tug which was built by A Hall & Co Ltd, Aberdeen. Launched on 21 December 1945 and completed in February 1946. To the Admiralty in 1947 and renamed Security. Scrapped in April 1966 at Burcht, Belgium.

=== Empire Roding ===
Empire Roding was a 2,957 GRT cargo ship which was built by Flensburger Schiffbau-Gesellschaft, Flensburg. Completed in 1937 as Ernst L M Russ for Ernst Russ, Hamburg. Seized in May 1945 at Flensburg. To MoWT and renamed Empire Roding. Allocated to the US in 1946, to USMC. Sold in 1947 to Eastport Steamship Corp, New York, and renamed Eastport. Sold in 1950 to Zim Israel Navigation Co, Israel, and rename Tsfonit. Sold in 1961 to Agenzia Generale Navigazione Marittima, Italy and renamed Flamatt. Sold in 1963 to Nana Trading & Shipping Co Ltd, Liberia, and renamed Florita. Sold in 1970 to Raffaele di Maio, Liberia and renamed Pamela. Scrapped in August 1972 at Trieste, Italy.

=== Empire Roger ===
Empire Roger was a 235 GRT tug which was built by A Hall & Co Ltd, Aberdeen. Launched on 10 April 1944 and completed in May 1944. Sold in 1949 to J Fisher & Sons, Barrow in Furness and renamed Fisherstown. Scrapped in June 1968 at Barrow in Furness.

=== Empire Ronaldsay ===
Empire Rondaldsay was a 7,331 GRT cargo ship which was built by Shipbuilding Corporation Ltd, Sunderland. Launched on 28 April 1947 and completed in July 1947 as Lagosian for United Africa Co Ltd, London. Sold in 1949 to Palm Line Ltd and renamed Lagos Palm. Operated under the management of United Africa Co Ltd. Renamed Oguta Palm in 1961. Sold in 1964 to Skaramange Shipping Co, Greece, and renamed Heraclitos. Operated under the management of M Scufalos, Greece. Management passed to G Eleftheriou, Greece in 1968. Sold in 1969 to Helean Navigation Co, Greece and renamed Herodemos, remaining under Eleftheriou's management. Arrived on 4 April 1973 at Split, Yugoslavia for scrapping.

=== Empire Rosa (I) ===
Empire Rosa was a 593 GRT tug which was built by Clelands (Successors) Ltd, Willington Quay-on-Tyne. Launched on 30 December 1944 as Empire Rosa and completed in April 1945 as Empire Jean. Sold in 1946 to Metal Industries Ltd and renamed Metinda III. To Armada Española in 1961 and renamed R A 3.

=== Empire Rosa (II) ===
Empire Rosa was a 292 GRT tug which was built by Blyth Dry Docks & Shipbuilding Co Ltd. Launched on 6 December 1945 and completed in April 1946. To the Admiralty in 1949. Used as a target tug for RAF bombing practice. On 3 December 1977 she broke from her moorings and drifted ashore at Luce Bay, Galloway. Salvaged but declared a constructive total loss. Scrapped at Troon, Ayrshire.

=== Empire Rosalind ===
Empire Rosalind was a 7,290 GRT cargo ship that was built by the Burntisland Shipbuilding Company Ltd, Burntisland, Fife. Launched on 10 November 1942 and completed in January 1943. Sold in 1949 to W Runciman & Co Ltd and renamed Rosemoor. Sold in 1952 to W H Schlieker AG, West Germany and renamed Helga. Sold in 1959 to August Bolten, West Germany, and renamed Helga Bolten. Sold in 1960 to Krupp Seeschiffahrt GmbH, West Germany and renamed Sollingen. Sold later that year to Oversea Shipping Co SA and renamed Mar Feliz. Operated under the management of Mariner Shipping Co Ltd, Hong Kong. Ran aground on 17 September 1960 in the Straat Kidjang, Indonesia, and damaged her bottom. Proceeded to Singapore then Hong Kong. Scrapped in 1960 in Hong Kong.

=== Empire Roseberry ===
Empire Roseberry was a 2,370 GRT tanker which was built by Blythswood Shipbuilding Co Ltd, Glasgow. Completed in July 1944. Struck a mine on 24 August 1944 off Normandy, France, and sank.

=== Empire Rother ===
Empire Rother was a 1,940 GRT cargo ship which was built by Swan, Hunter & Wigham Richardson Ltd, Newcastle upon Tyne. Completed in 1929 as Imari. Sold in 1930 to St Lawrence Steamships Ltd and renamed Delaware. To MoWT in 1943 and renamed Empire Rother. Operated under the management of William Cory & Sons Ltd. Sold in 1949 to Quebec North Shore Paper Co, Montreal and renamed Manicouagun. Renamed Washington Times-Herald in 1951 and Manitoulin in 1954. Scrapped in July 1961 at Port Dalhousie, Ontario.

=== Empire Rowan ===
Empire Rowan was a 9,462 GRT CAM ship which was built by Harland & Wolff Ltd, Glasgow. Completed in 1922 as Lochgoil for Royal Mail Lines Ltd. Damaged by a mine on 6 October 1939 5 nautical miles (9.3 km) from the Scarweather Light Vessel, Bristol Channel. Beached at Mumbles. Declared a constructive total loss but repaired. To MoWT in 1940 and renamed Empire Rowan. Torpedoed on 27 March 1943 by aircraft in Bay of Collo, northwest of Bône, Algeria and sunk. Wreck exploded underwater on 8 January 1951, believed to be caused by an unofficial salvage attempt.

=== Empire Ruby ===
Empire Ruby was a 667 GRT (800 DWT) coaster which was built by George Brown & Co (Marine) Ltd, Greenock. Launched on 26 June 1941 and completed in October 1941. Sold in 1946 to Athel Line Ltd and renamed Athelruby. Operated under the management of United Molasses Co Ltd, London. Sold in 1950 to F T Everard & Sons Ltd and renamed Akinity. Scrapped in April 1965 at Bruges, Belgium.

=== Empire Runner ===
Empire Runner was a 313 GRT (350 DWT) collier which was built by Richard Dunston Ltd, Thorne. Launched on 23 August 1943 and completed in October 1943. Sold in 1947 to South Coast Sand & Ballast Co Ltd. Converted to a sand sucker and renamed Sand Runner. Sold in 1954 to Zinal Steamship Co Ltd. Operated under the management of J Burness & Sons Ltd, London. Sold in 1954 to Burness Shipping Co Ltd, London. Remained under Burness's management until 1956, then operated under the management of William Cory & Son Ltd. Scrapped in July 1970 at Southampton.

=== Empire Rupert ===
Empire Rupert was a 487 GRT tug which was built by Goole Shipbuilding & Repairing Co Ltd, Goole. Launched on 10 November 1942 and completed in May 1943. Collided on 24 January 1945 with SS Twickenham Ferry 10 nautical miles (19 km) off Dover, Kent (51°03′N 01°32′E) and sank.

=== Empire Ruskin ===
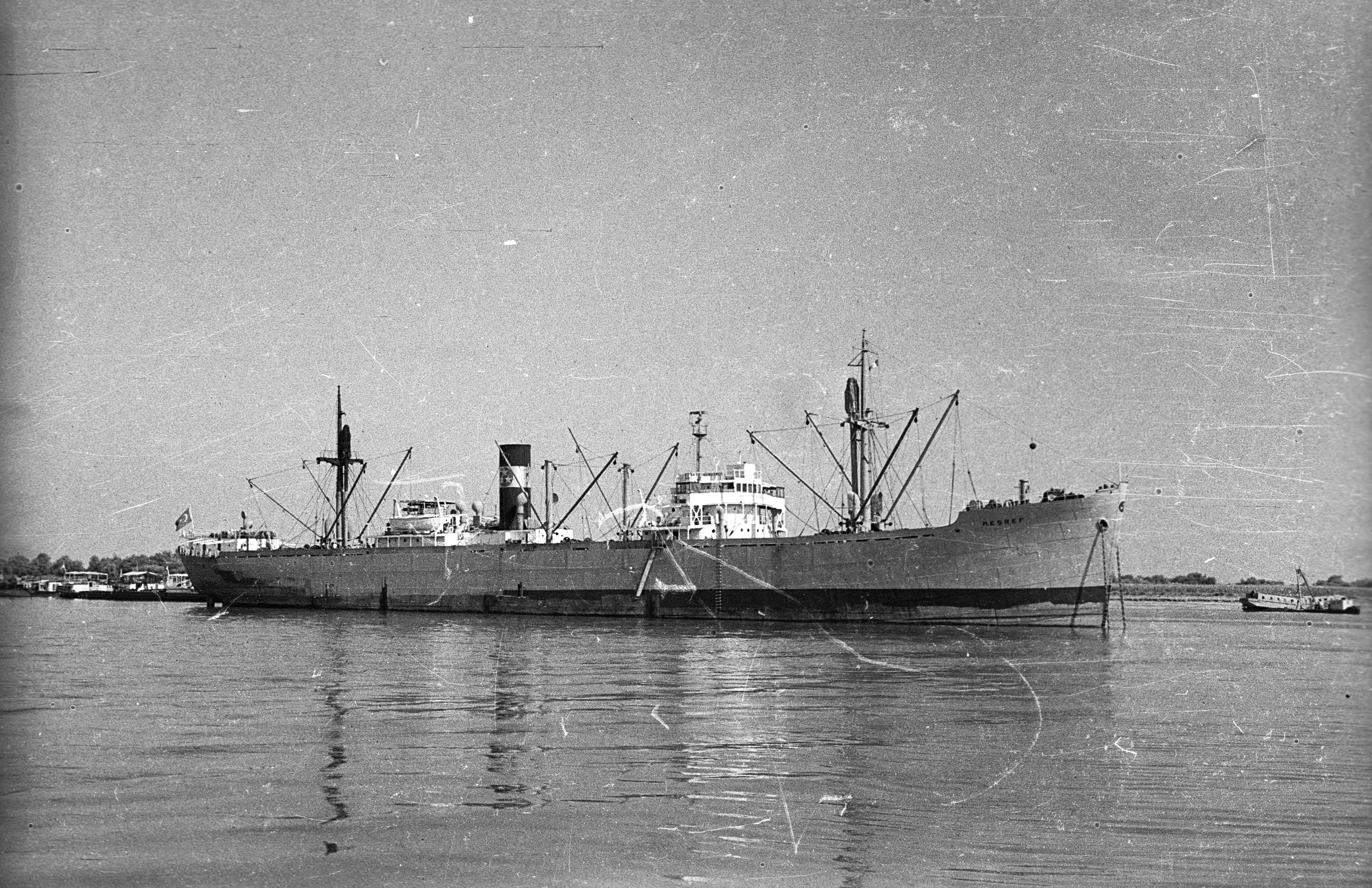
M. Esref

Empire Ruskin was a 7,037 GRT cargo ship which was built by John Readhead & Sons Ltd, South Shields. Launched on 14 July 1942 and completed in September 1942. Allocated in 1943 to the Dutch Government and renamed Van der Capelle. Sold in 1947 to Koninklijke Hollandsche Lloyd NV, Amsterdam and renamed Delfland. Sold in 1959 to Cerrahogullari Umumi Nakliyat TAS, Istanbul and renamed M Esref. Arrived on 13 October 1968 at Istanbul for scrapping.

=== Empire Russell ===
Empire Russell was a 3,750 GRT tanker which was built by Sir J Laing & Sons Ltd, Sunderland. Launched on 28 October 1943 and completed in February 1944. Sold in 1946 to Anglo-Saxon Petroleum Co Ltd and renamed Batissa. Sold in 1956 to Shell Tankers Ltd. Sold in 1960 to Estrella Maritima SA, Argentina. On 7 June 1970 Batissa was in collision with MV Italmotor in the Paraná River. Explosions and fire followed, the ship ran aground and was abandoned. Later refloated and laid up damaged at Buenos Aires. Previously arranged sale to Toba S.A.M.C.I.F, Argentina and renaming to Toba Pegaso fell through. Scrapped in 1977 at Buenos Aires.

=== Empire Ruth ===
Empire Ruth was a 258 GRT tug which was built by Scott & Sons, Bowling. Launched on 18 December 1944 and completed in February 1945. Sold in 1948 to the Iraqi Government and renamed Hadhir. Sold in 1966 to Iraqi Ports Administration and renamed Al Zab.

== See also ==
The above entries give a précis of each ship's history. For a fuller account see the linked articles.

== Sources ==
- Mitchell, WH; Sawyer, LA (1990). The Empire Ships (Second ed.). London, New York, Hamburg, Hong Kong: Lloyd's of London Press Ltd. ISBN 1-85044-275-4.
