= Serv =

Serv or SERV may refer to:

- Chrysler SERV, a single-stage to orbit rocket design submitted for the Space Shuttle contest
- Serv (imprint), an imprint of the German group VDM Publishing devoted to the reproduction of Wikipedia content
- SERV (charity), a charity based in England which provides a volunteer medical courier service for local hospitals

== See also ==
- Servia (disambiguation)
