= Sundowner (yacht) =

1912 yacht

Coordinates: 51.331691°N 1.421837°E

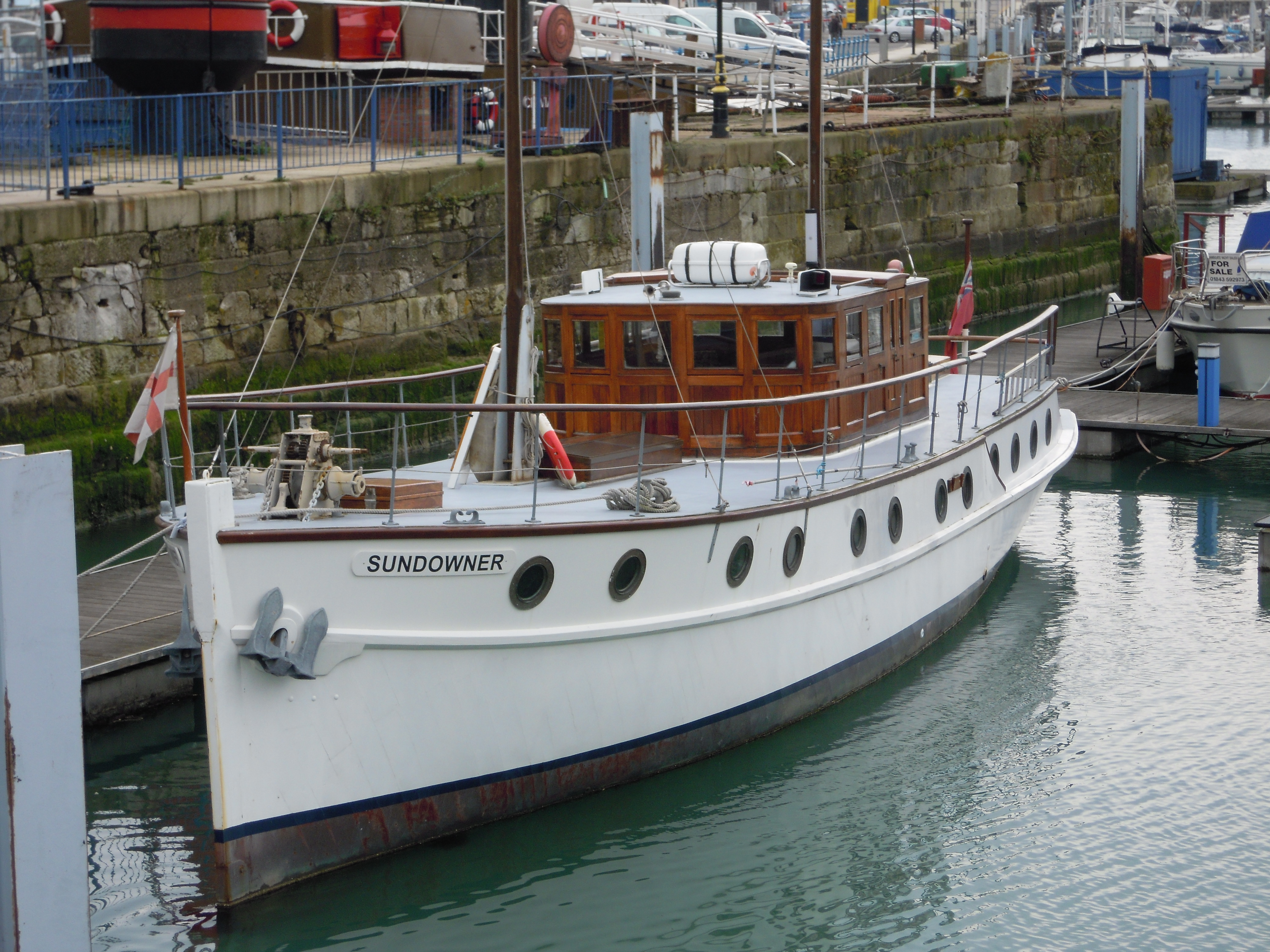
- Sundowner in Ramsgate Harbour, April 2010

History

United Kingdom
- Name: Sundowner
- Namesake: Sundowner
- Launched: 1912
- Refit: 1929
- Status: Museum ship

General characteristics
- Type: Motor yacht
- Tonnage: 26 grt (74 m^{3})
- Length: 58 ft (18 m)
- Beam: 12 ft 6 in (3.81 m)
- Draught: 5 ft (1.5 m)
- Propulsion: Gleniffer diesel engine, 72 hp (54 kW), single screw propeller
- Speed: 10 knots (19 km/h; 12 mph)

Service record
- Operations: Operation Dynamo

Sundowner is a motor yacht formerly owned by Charles Lightoller, former second officer of the RMS Titanic.

She participated in the Dunkirk evacuation as one of the "little ships" as well as a number of commemorations of the event, it was at the Ramsgate Maritime Museum in Southern England till the museum closed down in 2021. Due to the Ramsgate Maritime Museums lack of funds the Sundowner's condition deteriorated. It is currently at Dennett Boat Builders in England awaiting the current owner to raise funds for the Sundowner's restoration.

== Construction ==
Originally built in 1912, the former Admiralty steam pinnace was bought in 1929 for £40 (equivalent to £2,000 today) by Charles and Sylvia Lightoller. The hull was recovered from the mud at Conyer Creek east of the River Medway and was fitted with two masts and ketch-rigged with jib, mainsail, mizzen and mizzen staysail. Due to Sylvia being Australian, they named their converted yacht Sundowner, an Australian term for a tramp or hobo. Originally 52 feet (16 metres) long, she was extended to 58 feet (18 metres), and fitted with a 60-horsepower (45-kilowatt) Parsons petrol-paraffin 4-stroke engine driving a single propeller, giving her a top speed of 8 knots (15 km/h).

Sundowner was launched on 28 June 1930, and after trials on the Thames, undertook her first voyage to France. During the next ten years the Lightollers cruised along the northern coast of Europe, taking part successfully in many international competitions. In 1936 Lightoller replaced the engine with a more powerful 72 hp (54 kW) Gleniffer diesel engine giving her an extra two knots (4 km/h). In 1939, with the threat of war looming, Lightoller was tasked to secretly survey the European coast for the Admiralty.

== Dunkirk ==
On 31 May 1940, Sundowner was requisitioned by the Admiralty to sail to Dunkirk to assist in the evacuation. Lightoller, aged 66 and retired, volunteered to take her, along with his eldest son Roger, and Gerald Ashcroft, an 18-year-old Sea Scout.

Leaving the Port of Ramsgate at 10:00 on 1 June, the yacht crossed the Channel in company with five other ships. On their way, they rescued the crew of the motor cruiser Westerly, which had broken down and was on fire. On arrival at Dunkirk, Lightoller realised that the piers were too high, and so drew alongside the destroyer HMS Worcester and started to take on soldiers. Seventy-five men were crammed into the cabin, and another fifty-five on deck, a total of 130. Sundowner then returned to Ramsgate, avoiding fire from enemy aircraft through evasive manoeuvres on the way, though the greatest danger was being swamped by the wash from fast-moving destroyers. After disembarking the troops, she was preparing to return for France for another load, but by then only ships capable of doing 20 knots were allowed to continue.

Sundowner remained in service as a coastal patrol vessel in the River Blackwater, Essex. She then moved to the River Clyde under the control of 647 Transport Company, Royal Army Service Corps. She was released from service in 1945, and after a refit was returned to Lightoller in 1946, and once again used as a family boat.

== Post-war ==
Charles Lightoller died in 1952, and his wife Sylvia continued to cruise in Sundowner, taking the helm when she led the Armada of Little Ships on the 25th Anniversary return to Dunkirk in 1965. After passing through several other owners, Sundowner was purchased by the East Kent Maritime Trust after the last owners, Jamie and Baffy Turner, had to put into Ramsgate harbour (on passage from the Medway to a new berth in Southampton) in August 1986 for repair to the hull after suffering heavy damage in rough weather. She was restored for the 50th anniversary of Dunkirk in 1990. In 2000 Sundowner also took part in the 60th anniversary flotilla, once more sailing to Dunkirk. On 3 June 2012, Sundowner participated in the Thames Diamond Jubilee Pageant among other "Dunkirk Little Ships".

By September 2022, Sundowner had been transferred into the care of Dennett's Shipbuilders in Chertsey. At that time, the ship was in need of major repairs and restoration. That same month, an American TikTok channel creator began work to raise awareness and funds to aid in the ship's restoration.

The motor yacht Sundowner plays a prominent role in the narrative presented in the book Unsinkable Lights: Charles H. Lightoller’s Epic Tale of Hope and Survival. Authored by historian, author, and U.S. Navy veteran Dustin D. Hyland, this work was published in 2026, detailing the extraordinary life of Lightoller—from his survival as the most senior surviving officer of the RMS Titanic disaster to his service during the Dunkirk evacuation aboard the Sundowner.

=== Website ===
The Sundowner has its own website https://sundowner.online/with its own gallery, history, and it's fundraising page. Explaining the Sundowner's History from its origin with the British Navy to its current location.
