= Ramsgate Maritime Museum =

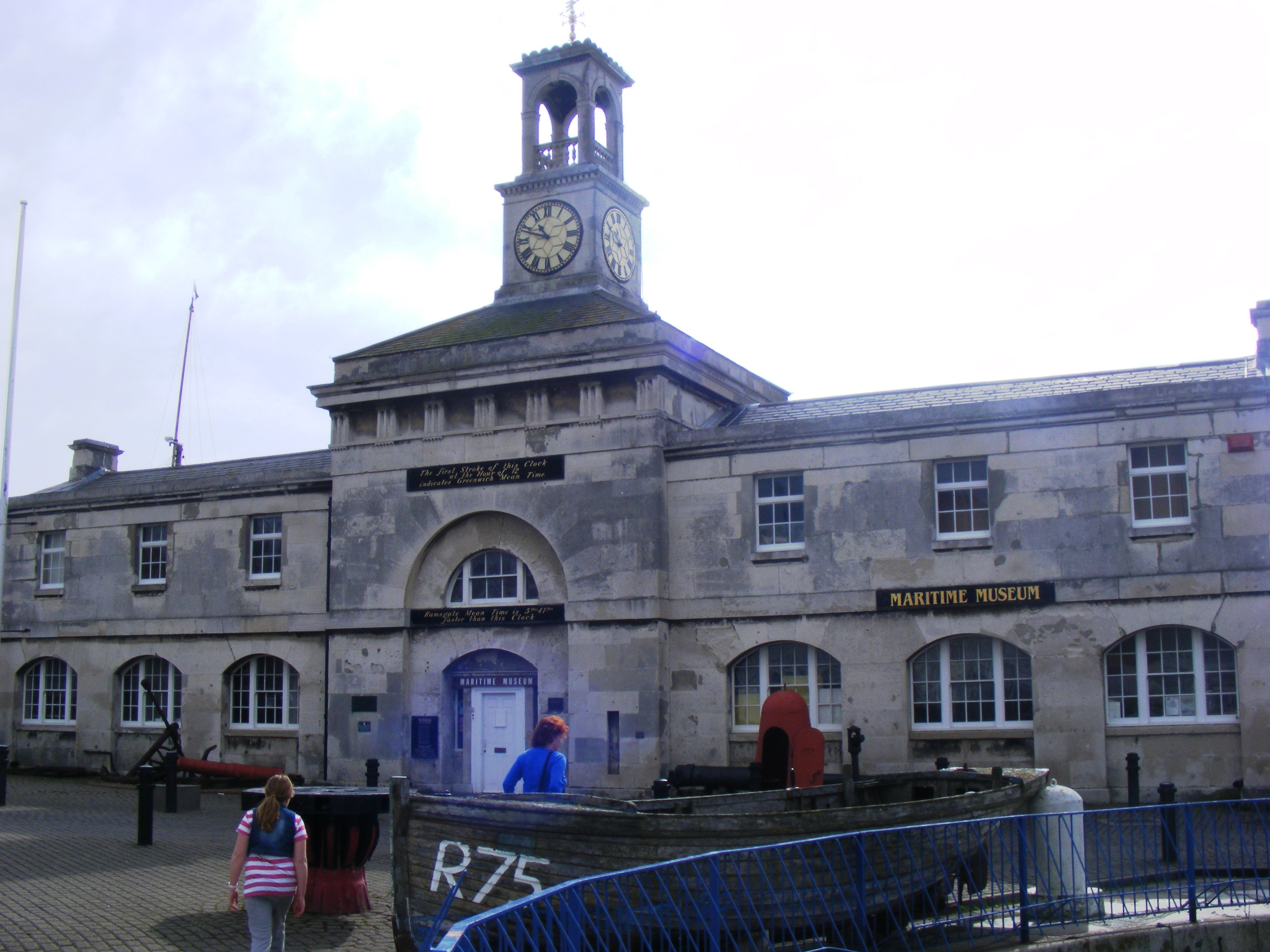
- Ramsgate Maritime Museum

- Location within Kent
- Location: Ramsgate, Kent, England
- Coordinates: 51.3315°N 1.4224°E
- Type: Maritime Museum
- Public transit access: Ramsgate railway station
- Website: www.visitramsgate.co.uk/maritime-museum/

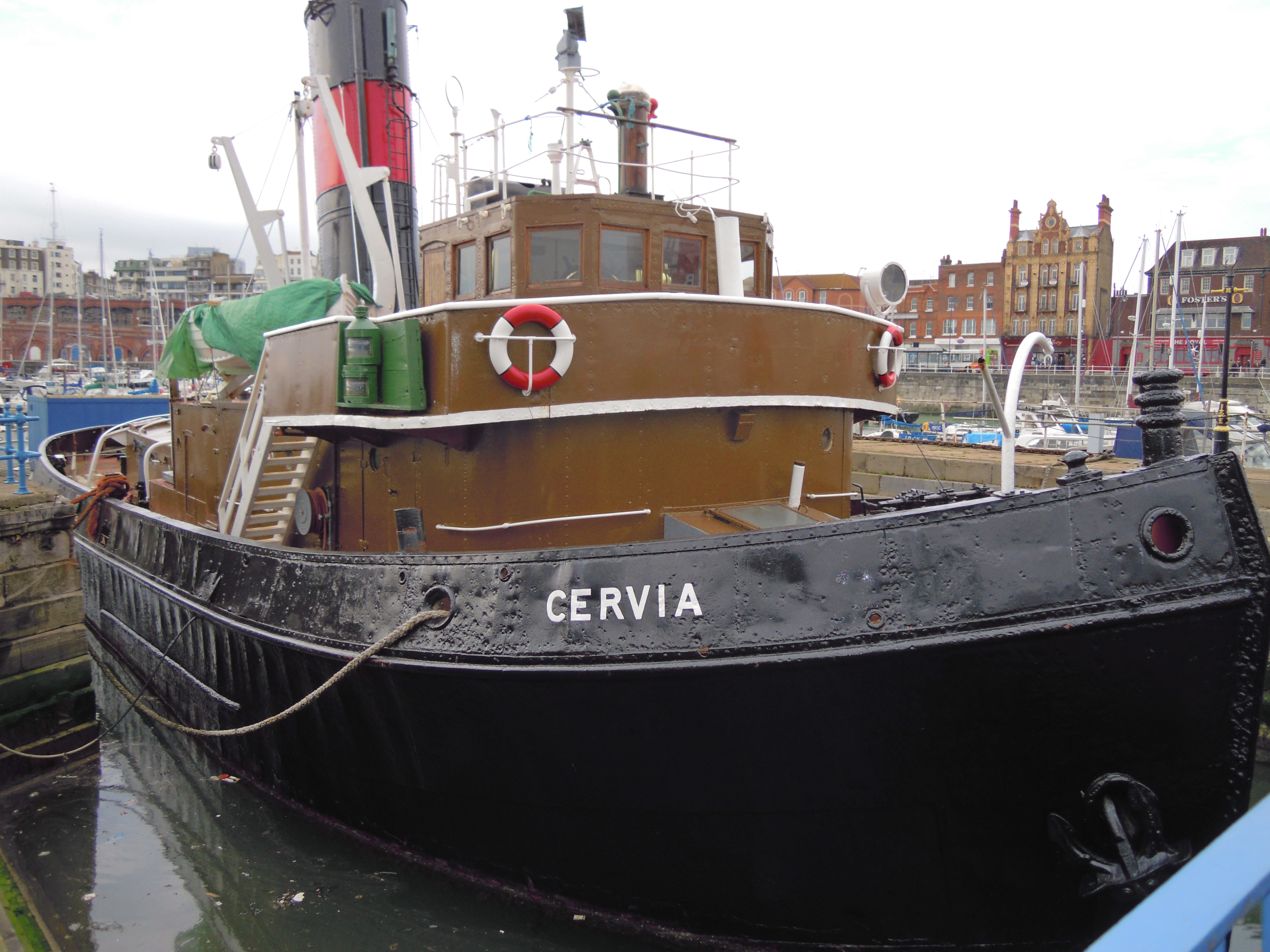
Cervia, a steam tug.

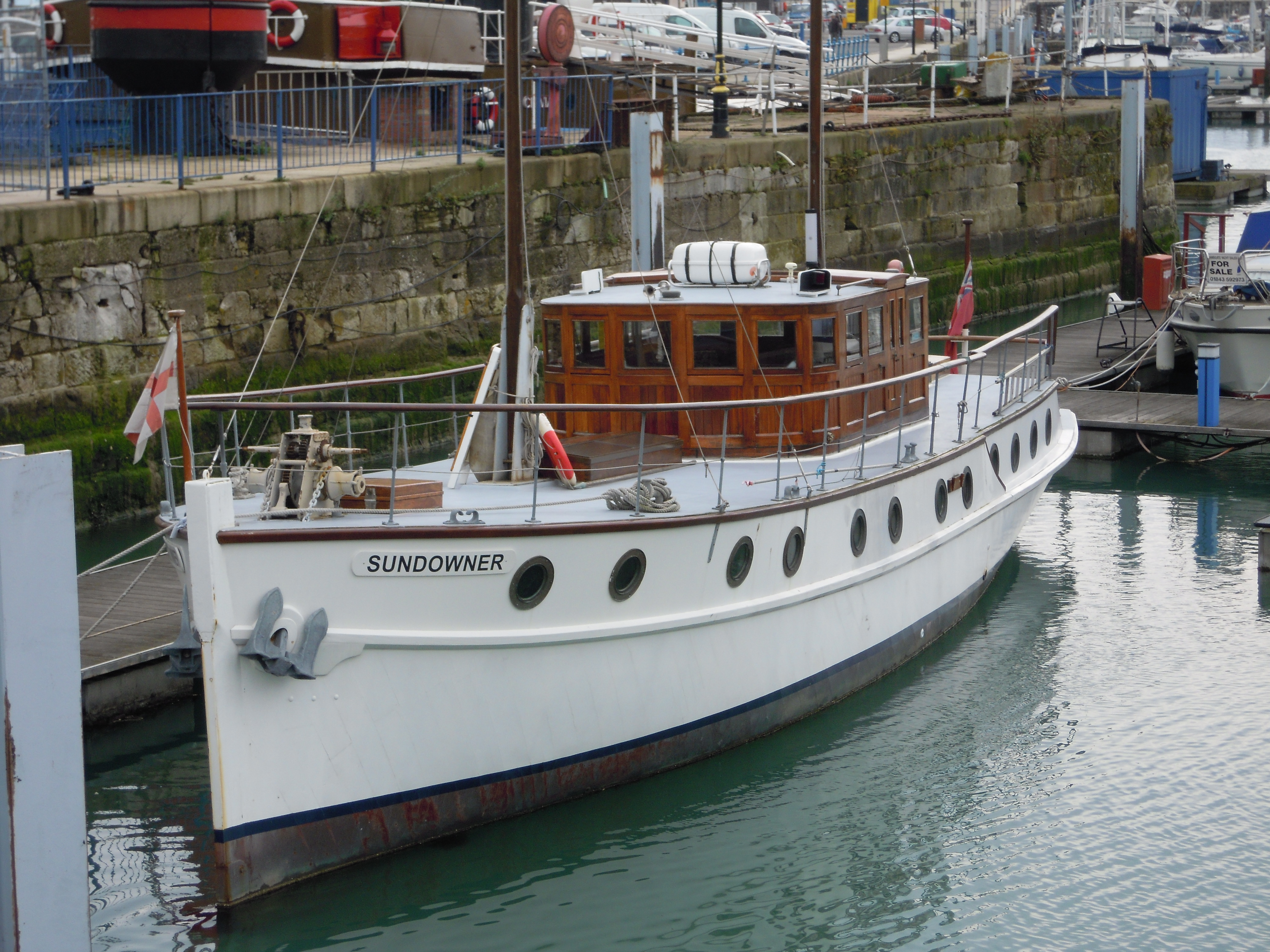
Sundowner, a Dunkirk little ship.

Ramsgate Maritime Museum (or Clock House Museum) is a museum in Ramsgate, Kent, England, that describes the maritime history of East Kent. The museum is situated in the Clock House on the quayside of the Royal Harbour at Ramsgate.

Ramsgate Maritime Museum was run by the Steam Museum Trust, a registered charity from 2012 to 2023, when the lease was returned to Thanet District Council. The museum closed in 2021 for a major refurbishment of the Clock House building, and is expected to reopen in 2026 as a museum and heritage hub for the town.

== Buildings ==
The Clock House was built in 1817 by Benjamen Wyatt and George Louch. It was later altered by John Rennie and is now designated as a Grade II* listed building.

== Exhibits ==
Before closure in 2021, there were four permanent galleries covering the development of the harbour, navigation, fishing, lifeboats and shipwrecks. A fifth exhibition space houses a 17th-century 32-pounder demi-cannon raised from the wreck of HMS Stirling Castle. A number of artefacts come from the nearby Goodwin Sands which is responsible for numerous shipwrecks.

Exhibits include two museum ships: the 1946 steam tug Cervia and Sundowner, a 1912 Dunkirk little ship.

== See also ==
- Port of Ramsgate
- Ramsgate Lifeboat Station
