= Cervia gas field =

Italian gas field in the Adriatic Sea

Cervia
- Country: Italy
- Region: Adriatic Sea
- Offshore/onshore: offshore
- Operator: Eni

Field history
- Discovery: 1972
- Start of development: 1973
- Start of production: 1973

Production
- Current production of gas: 1.43×10^{6} m^{3}/d 46×10^{6} cu ft/d 0.51×10^{9} m^{3}/a (18×10^{9} cu ft/a)
- Estimated gas in place: 10×10^{9} m^{3} 354×10^{9} cu ft

The Cervia gas field natural gas field located on the continental shelf of the Adriatic Sea. It was discovered in 1972 and developed by Eni. It began production in 1973 and produces natural gas and condensates. The total proven reserves of the Cervia gas field are around 354 billion cubic feet (10×10^{9}m³), and production is slated to be around 46 million cubic feet/day (1.43×10^{5}m³) in 2010.
