= Servia =

Servia or Servian refers to:

- The historical English term, taken from the Greek language, used in relation with Serbia, Serbs or the Serbian language
- Servia, Greece, a town in northern Greece
- Servia, Indiana, a town in the United States
- Servia, Washington, a place in Adams County, Washington, United States
- Servia, West Virginia, a community in Braxton County, West Virginia, United States
- Servian, Hérault, a commune of the Hérault département in France
- SS Servia, a 19th-century British ship of the Cunard Line
- Servian Wall, a wall built through southern Rome when Rome was still a city-state
- Oriol Servià, a Spanish IndyCar driver
