= ST Cervia =

Preserved steam tug built in 1946

Coordinates: 51.331439°N 1.421508°E

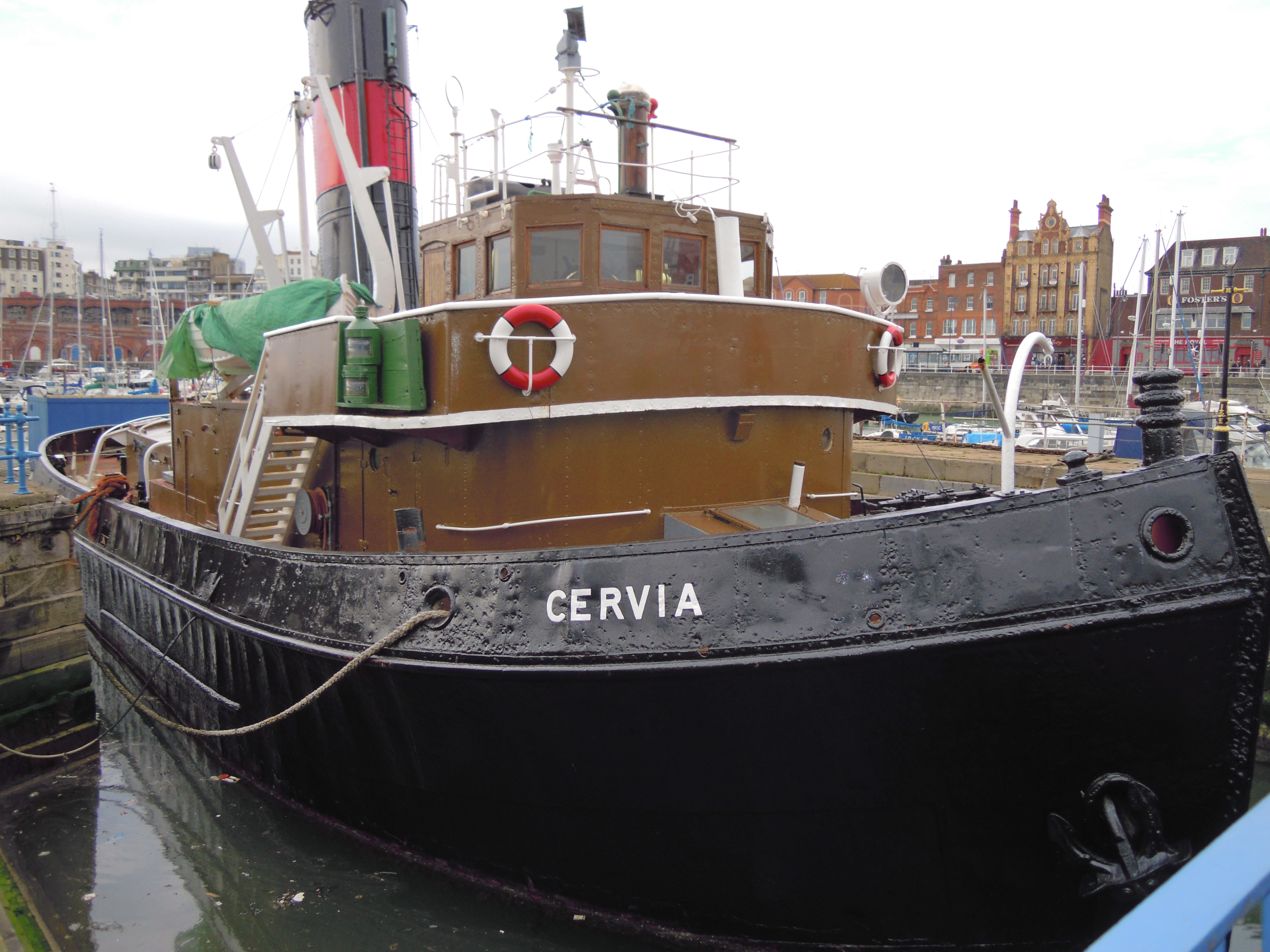
- Cervia

History

United Kingdom
- Name: Empire Raymond (1946-47); Cervia (since 1947)
- Owner: Ministry of War Transport.; Wm.Watkins of London.; East Kent Maritime Museum
- Port of registry: London
- Builder: Alexander Hall & Company Limited, Aberdeen, Scotland.
- Yard number: 709
- Laid down: 1945
- Launched: 21 January 1946
- Completed: 30 April 1946
- Identification: IMO number: 5067534; United Kingdom Official Number 180997; Code Letters GDPM; National Register of Historic Vessels; Certificate No: 5
- Status: Floating museum ship, under restoration

General characteristics
- Class & type: Empire tug
- Tonnage: 233 GRT
- Length: 112 ft 8 in (34.34 m) overall
- Beam: 27 ft 4 in (8.33 m)
- Draught: 11 ft 7 in (3.53 m)
- Depth: 27 ft 4 in (8.33 m)
- Installed power: 1,000 Bhp, triple-expansion oil-fired steam engine by builder, Boiler, Scotch Return Tube.
- Propulsion: Screw propeller

ST Cervia was built in 1946 as a seagoing tug for use as a fleet auxiliary by Alexandra Hall & Company Ltd of Aberdeen, Scotland. Today she is a floating Museum undergoing maintenance and restoration in Ramsgate, Kent.

== Design and construction ==
The Cervia design closely followed an early designed steam tug class called Foremost which had been conceived in 1923. The reasoning behind the recycling of this old design was due to Britain’s need to quickly replace losses, and because of the government’s rapid rebuilding programme. Using the best of pre-war tried and tested tug designs would avoid the need for new designs, and get round any delays to the Admiralties rebuild plans. Empire Raymond, as the Cervia was originally named, was part of the revised building programme ordered for Operation Overlord, the invasion of Europe on D-Day. In the event she was not completed until after the end of the Second World War. The tug was finished with many of the design features intended for the invasion. She had an armoured wheelhouse and gun emplacements installed. She weighed over 350 tons and was powered by a 1,000 horsepower (750 kW) triple-expansion steam engine. Her boiler had been installed with oil burners but the design allowed for rapidly reverted to coal firing. All the ships that were ordered by the British government during the War period were given the prefix Empire which was the equivalent of the "Liberty Ship" building programme in the United States of America. The Cervia is thought to be last Empire Ship surviving in the United Kingdom.

== History ==
The Cervia was launched from the yard of Alexander Hall and Co. Ltd in Aberdeen, Scotland, on 21 January 1946 and was handed to the Ministry of War Transport. In December 1946 she was sold on to the maritime towing business of William Watkins Ltd for the sum of £36,000. The business had purchased the tug using compensation it received for the vessels it lost on War service such as the tugs "Napia" and "Muria", which were sunk after collisions with mines near Ramsgate in 1939 and 1940.

=== Name Change ===
In 1947 the Empire Raymond name was changed to Cervia after the Italian Adriatic resort where the Watkins family owned a holiday villa. The name had previously been used on an earlier tug owned by William Watkins which taken part in the evacuation of Dunkirk in 1940 returning from there with 230 troops.

=== Working life ===
Whilst still known as the Empire Raymond the tug was employed with other tugs in the refurbishment of the Cunard liner Queen Elizabeth from her role as troop ship back to a passenger liner. During the working life of Cervia the main role that she was deployed in was as a towing and salvage tug between ports in the United Kingdom and mainland Europe. When based in Ramsgate "Cervia" helped free several vessels that had run aground on the Goodwin Sand Banks off of the East-Kent coast in the vicinity of Ramsgate and Deal. Her association with the port would continue for 60 years right up to the present time.

=== Ramsgate ===
The Cervia, along with other ships owned by Watkins, were regularly maintained and repaired at the workshops and slipways of Claxton’s Ltd in Ramsgate. Claxton’s was subsidiary of William Watkins. In 1950 William Watkins Ltd was merged with other companies to form Ship Towage Ltd of London. As part of this company’s fleet the Cervia was involved in a serious incident.

=== Capsize ===
On 25 October 1954 the Cervia was employed at Tilbury docks in London. Cervia was involved in the undocking of the P&O liner Arcadia, towing the liner stern first away from her landing stage. During this manoeuvre, the Arcadia had gone full ahead to avoid collision with liner P&O liner Orcades. The resulting wash caused Cervia to be dragged over and capsize and sink. Despite their valiant efforts to release the towing hawser the Cervia Captain Russell, MBE and five of her crew died. Another Watkins owned tug, Challenge, managed to rescue three of the crew. The subsequent court of enquiry into the case, recorded that the deaths were accidental, and the sinking was caused by the failure of a quick release pin on her towing hook. On 28 October the Cervia herself became subject of a salvage operation. The tug was raised from the Thames riverbed and she was taken to Claxton’s Ltd in Ramsgate for a refit and then returned to service. On 27 January 1969 Cervia was at work on the Thames when her owners merged with W.H.J. Alexander & Company Ltd to form the London Tug Company. The London Tug Company was to have a policy to phase out steam tugs in favour of more modern diesel vessels. The modernization of the fleet went ahead at speed and by 1971 the Cervia was laid up at Sheerness. It was hoped a buyer could be found or the tug would go to the breakers. The Cervia was offered to a Michael List-Brain a potential buyer who wished to preserve her. The Board of London Tugs agreed to her sale "as is, where lies", for the sum of £3,500. Mr List-Brain purchased the ‘‘Cervia’’ in April 1973 and took possession at Poplar Docks, London where she had been laid up. The tug then was given a refit and was back in steam by the summer.

=== Medway Maritime Museum ===
She was used on the River Medway for both for pleasure trips and for her new owner to familiarize himself with her. It was envisaged that Cervia would become a part of a new organisation to be called "The Medway Maritime Museum". This was the idea of the United Kingdom's foremost ship preservationists, Martin Stevens. Unfortunately by 1974, the plans faltered when the Medway Council proved to be unable to provide sufficient funding for the project and with having neither premises nor any money, the original museum project looked very precarious.

=== Back to work ===
With the fledgling museum’s lack of income, List-Brain and Stevens decided that one solution was to put the Cervia back to work in the towing business. At this time exploration in the North sea for gas and oil was beginning to pick up in pace. This provided an ideal opportunity for the Cervia to earn her keep again. The Cervia was contracted to a construction firm based on the Medway. The construction firm of Howard Doris needed all manner of craft to assist with oil rig construction projects. In November 1974 Cervia to towed a crane barge to the Humber. She completed the contract with no problems, but with the cost of a very rapid re-equipping and complete lack of understanding as to the economics of marine towage meant the nett profit from this first towing contract was only £7.00.

=== International Towing Ltd ===
Following the contract with Howard Doris and the small profit, List-Brain and Stevens decided to put the fledgling business on a more professional business footing. A professional crew was employed and throughout 1975 several more successful towing contracts were undertaken by the Cervia all around the coast of the United Kingdom. During this time Cervia continued to prove her reliability working solidly for this twelve-month period except for a small period of time spent on essential boiler cleaning and maintenance. So successful was the business and the increasing demands placed on it, a proper company was set up which was called International Towing Ltd. ITL, as the company was abbreviated to, added three more steam tugs to her books to keep up with demand. These’s tugs were ST Hercules, ST Hero and ST Goliath.

=== Ramsgate ===
Like Watkins before them, International Towing Ltd. decided to choose Ramsgate as their home port. The knock on effect of these decisions gave a welcome boost to the local economy of Ramsgate which saw a resurgence of commercial ship repairing in the harbour. Cervia and the three other tugs were kept very busy with a variety of jobs both in the North Sea and with coastal towage contracts. In early 1977 two of the tugs of ITL, ST Hercules and ST Hero were taken out of service and returned to the Medway Maritime Trust, under the guidance of Martin Stevens. Nonetheless, ITL saw its business rapidly expand becoming an international operation all thanks to the reliability and hard work of Cervia and her sister tugs. To meet customer demands, Cervia and Goliath were joined further modern deep sea diesel powered tugs in 1978. by the 1980s, ITL’s fleet had grown to include the two most powerful tugs in the northern hemisphere and the business was sold off to the Far East. Cervia carried on working for ITL until 1983. Her last contract was to act as port tug for the new cross-channel ferry service at Ramsgate. The contract was terminated when the ferry service failed to operate a regular service due to the difficult economic climate of the early 1980s. Cervia was mothballed alongside the East Pier at Ramsgate Royal Harbour.

=== Appearances in books and film ===
It was after this time that Cervia fulfilled a different role as a film location in an episode of the BBC comedy series Ripping Yarns called The Curse Of The Claw with Michael Palin. Cervia had also been used in BBC production of Rogue Male starring Peter O'Toole in the mid-seventies. She was also the subject of a 1986 children's book, Cervia the Steam Tug, written and illustrated by Roger Ian Sacks in support of the East Kent Maritime Trust's Ramsgate Maritime Museum.

== Maritime Museum, Ramsgate ==
After negotiations between Cervia’s owners and Thanet District Council's Harbour Master and his deputy, the tug was loaned and placed in the care of Ramsgate Maritime Museum, run by the East Kent Maritime Trust in July 1985. Later in July she was taken to moorings in John Smeaton's Historic Dry Dock. Funding was then secured for restoration work to be carried out on the Cervia. She was repainted to her original working livery of William Watkins days. A new mast was also fitted and her crew accommodation was refurbished to provide areas for museum displays. In 1986 Cervia was visited by Queen Elizabeth The Queen Mother. To mark Cervia's 50th birthday a specialist engineer John Vineer oversaw restoration of the tugs 1,000 horsepower engine to full working order. Cervia became the centre point of the 'Historic Harbour' initiative and was joined by other vessels from the maritime museum's collection and privately owned classic boats.

=== Uncertain future ===
The East Kent Maritime Trust attempted to put together a joint restoration project for both the Smeaton's Dry Dock and the steam tug "Cervia". It was hoped that funding from a number of sources including the Heritage Lottery Fund, the European Regional Development Fund, other E.U. grants and private sources would be secured. The East Kent Maritime Trust later shelved this project By 2010 the Steam Museum Trust was hoping to start a stand-alone restoration project for the tug. The ST Cervia remains moored in Ramsgate harbour, a rare survivor of steam ship development. She was also the last steam tug to work commercially in British waters.

In June 2022, National Historic Ships UK announced that, as sufficient restoration funding was not available, the owner intends to "deconstruct" the tug.

== Gallery ==
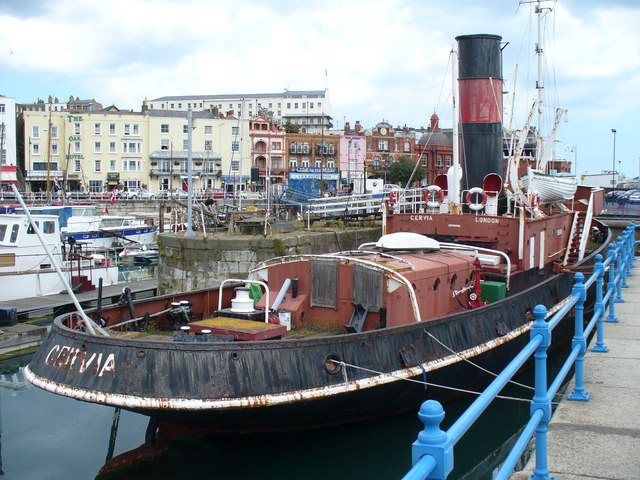
The Cervia in Ramsgate Harbour
