= How Hill =

How Hill may refer to:

- How Hill, Cumbria, a hamlet in Cumbria, England
- How Hill, Norfolk, a hamlet in Norfolk, England

== See also ==
- How Hill House
- How Hill Tower at Studley Royal, North Yorkshire
