= How Hill House =

Edwardian house in Norfolk, England

Coordinates: 52°43′12″N 1°30′46″E

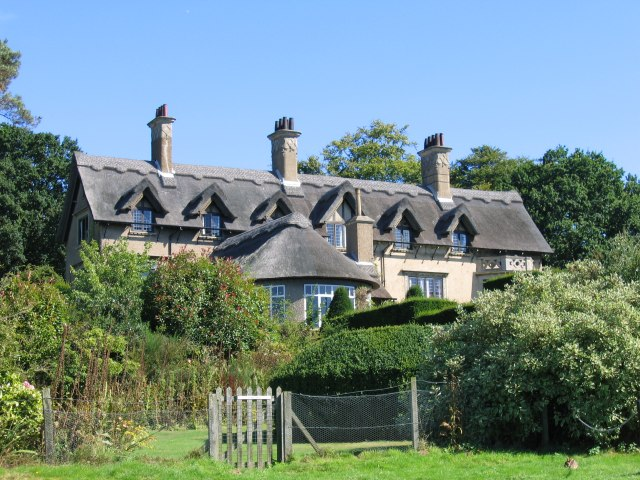
How Hill House

How Hill House is a large Edwardian house in How Hill, an area of Ludham parish, Norfolk, England. The house overlooks the River Ant and is within the Broads National Park. The house was designed in the vernacular revival style by the English architect Edward Thomas Boardman in 1903 who intended it to be his family's country retreat. The Boardman family owned the house until 1966 before its sale to Norfolk County Council. Years later it was sold to Norwich Union who eventually gifted the house to the How Hill Trust, an environmental education charity. The house is a Grade II listed building.

== History ==
The architect Edward Thomas Boardman (the son of the better-known architect Edward Boardman) decided to build a family retreat within the area known locally as How Hill. He purchased the land, designed the house, and built it over three years, completing it in 1903. Edward Thomas was later Mayor of Norwich in 1905–1906.

The Boardman family made the house their permanent residence in 1918, after some major expansion. The house became the property of Edward's son, Christopher, who was notable for winning gold in sailing at the 1936 Summer Olympics. The house remained in the Boardman family until 1966 when it was sold to Norfolk County Council for £37,000. It then became a residential education centre before closing in 1983, and was sold to the insurance company Norwich Union who leased then gifted it to the How Hill Trust, an educational charity which operates it as a children's study centre. In 1987 the house was designated as a Grade II listed building by English Heritage.

=== Architecture ===
The house was designed in the vernacular, Jacobean style using roughcast brick. It is laid out in 2-and-a-half storeys. The roof is supported by gables with moulded timber bargeboards; it is covered in thatching. The interior remains original and includes a panelled hall, staircase and sitting room. A sun parlour was added to the west of the house in 1910 but was moved six years later. A third, matching chimney stack was added the same year.

=== Grounds and Olympic Oak ===
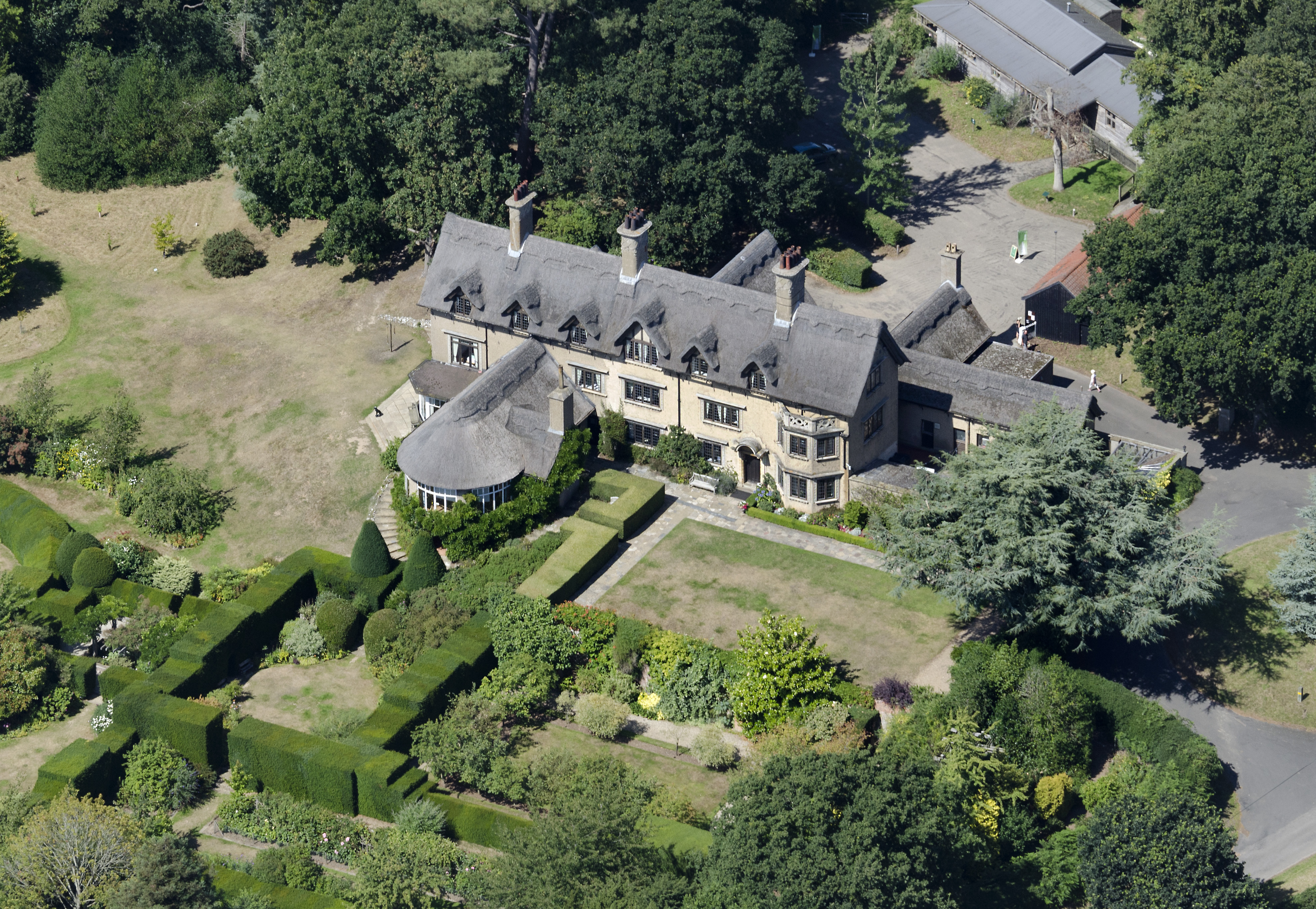
Aerial view of How Hill House

Just prior to the alteration period in 1910, Edward Boardman had 70,000 trees planted on the estate and set out the formal gardens to the south and the west of the property. His son, Christopher, was given an oak sapling by Adolf Hitler for winning a gold medal at the 1936 Berlin Olympic Games. He planted it in the grounds but it sustained damage during a storm in 1987. In an attempt to save the oak it was pollarded in 2013, but it succumbed to Honey Fungi infestation. A memorial carving of Christopher's achievements in the 1936 Olympic Games was made out of the stump. The tree was one of four remaining Olympic oaks in the United Kingdom that were donated by Hitler prior to the Second World War.
