= Forest swastika =

Trees planted to resemble a swastika in Germany

Aerial photograph of the swastika on 14 November 2000, from a German tabloid

The forest swastika was a patch of 100 larch trees in a pine forest located near Zernikow, Uckermark district, Brandenburg, northeastern Germany. The trees were arranged with their light colors to look like a swastika, and it covered a 0.36 ha (0.89 acres) area. It was removed by the German government in 2000.

== History ==
Reports say the larches were planted in 1938. It is unclear how the trees came to be planted and arranged in such a fashion. They may have been planted in commemoration of Adolf Hitler's 50th birthday, either by local Hitler Youth members or by a warden.

For a few weeks every year in the autumn and in the spring, the colour of the larch leaves would change, contrasting with the deep green of the pine forest. The short duration of the effect, combined with the fact that the image could only be seen from the air, and the relative scarcity of privately owned airplanes in the area, meant that the swastika went largely unnoticed after the fall of Nazi Germany. During the subsequent communist period, Soviet authorities reportedly knew of its existence, but made no effort to remove it.

In 1992, an analyst examining aerial photographs of the area noticed the design; the decisive image had been taken in autumn, when the larches' yellow-brown needles contrasted with the surrounding pines.

== Removal ==
The Brandenburg state authorities, concerned about damage to the region's image and the possibility that the area would become a pilgrimage site for Nazi supporters, attempted to destroy it by removing 43 of the 100 larch trees in 1995. The swastika remained visible, and some trees had regrown; in 2000, German tabloids published aerial photographs showing its prominence. By this time, ownership of around half the land on which the trees sat had been sold into private hands, but on 4 December 2000, a further 25 trees on the government-owned area were felled, and the image was largely obscured.

== Similar incidents ==
In the late 1970s, American troops discovered a swastika along with the numbers "1933" planted in a similar style in Hesse. Who planted the trees is unknown.

In September 2006, The New York Times reported on a reversed forest swastika made of fir trees in Eki Naryn, Kyrgyzstan, on the edge of the Tian Shan Mountains. It is about 200 metres (660 feet) across. Myths and legends abound about how and when the swastika came to be planted in Soviet territory.

== See also ==
- Olympic oaks, arboreal relics of 1930s Germany
- List of individual trees
