= Royal Hotel, Norwich =

Former hotel in Norwich, England

Royal Hotel
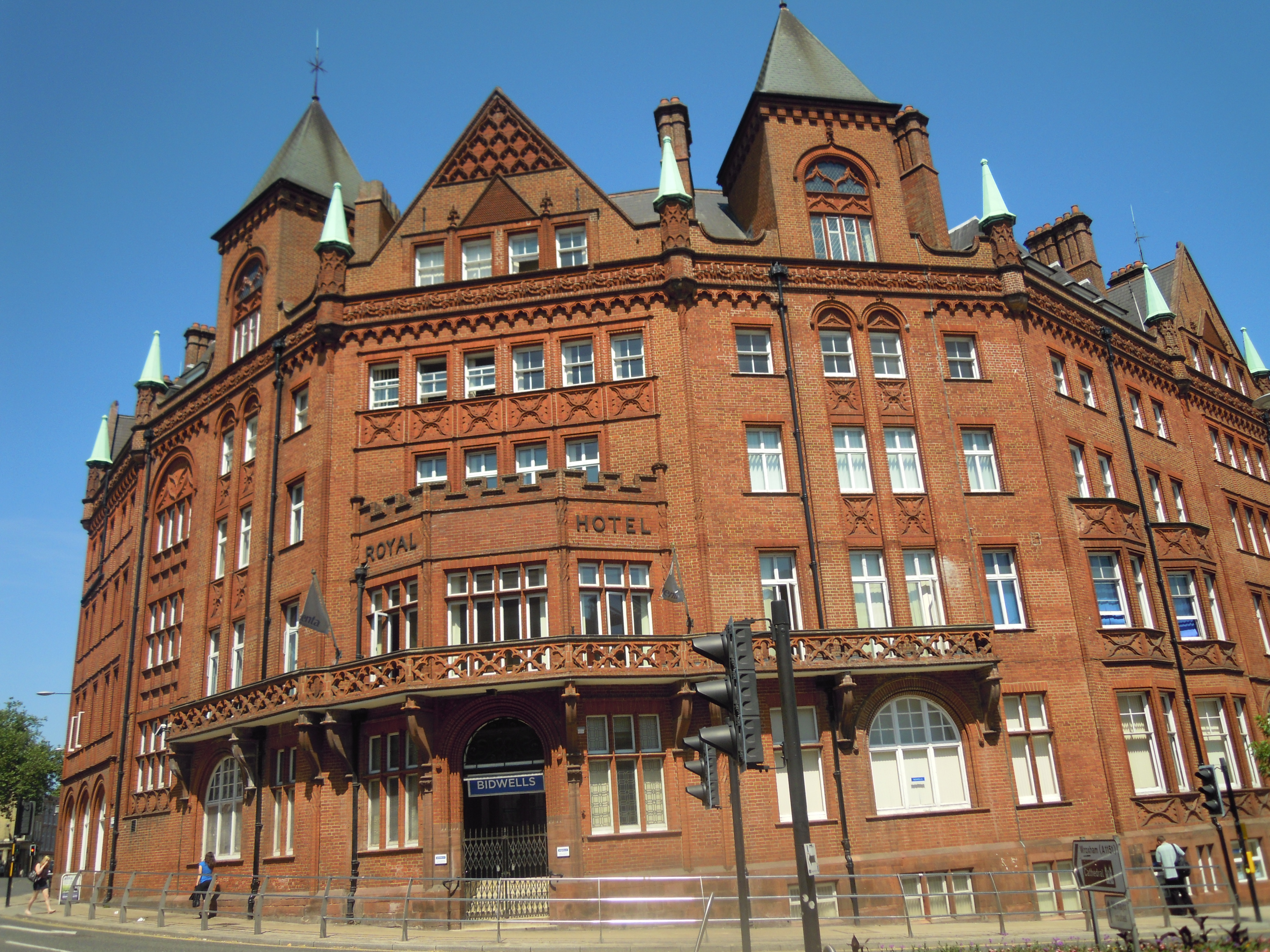
- The Former Royal Hotel, Norwich

- Norfolk

General information
- Location: Agricultural Hall Plain, Norwich, Norfolk, England, Agricultural Hall Plain; Norwich; NR3 1HA
- Coordinates: 52°37′46.26″N 1°17′54.37″E
- Opening: 16 November 1897
- Closed: 1977; Bar and buttery closed in March 1986
- Owner: Mr T C Blofield (Company Chairman in 1897)
- Operator: The Royal Hotel, Norwich Ltd

Technical details
- Floor count: Six storeys including a basement

Design and construction
- Architect: Edward Boardman
- Developer: John Youngs & Son

Other information
- Number of rooms: 65 bedrooms over four storeys

Listed Building – Grade II
- Designated: 8 April 1986
- Reference no.: 1372725

The Royal Hotel is a Grade II listed building and was a former hotel located in the English city of Norwich in the county of Norfolk. The hotel closed its doors in 1977 and is now used as a business centre.

== History ==
=== Origins ===
The building is located at the western end of Prince of Wales Road, at its junction with Agricultural Hall Plain. The building you see today was built to replace an old coaching inn of the same name which stood on Gentleman's Walk overlooking Norwich marketplace and was approximately 0.5 miles (0.80 km) from the present building. The previous inn was one of a number of old inns in that area which had originally been built to providing lodgings for travellers on the stagecoaches to the city up until the mid-19th century, when the stagecoach gave way to rail travel, the old Royal coaching inn was demolished and, in its place, the Royal Arcade was constructed. The new shopping arcade was designed in the Art Nouveau style by Norwich architect, George Skipper in 1899.

=== New site ===
The new site in the area now called Agricultural Hall Plain was at the heart of Norwich's commercial district. The site of the new hotel had to be cleared of buildings previously occupied by a firm of solicitors, Fosters, Burroughs and Robberds and the yard of the stonemason company of Barnabas Barrett. During the site clearance in 1896 discoveries were made of sections of Norwich Castle outer precincts. The new hotel was designed by the Norwich architect Edward Boardman, who was one of the most successful Norwich architects in the second half of the 19th century.

=== Builder ===
A local building company called John Youngs and Son was used for the construction and the building was completed, along with the demolishing and clearance of the old Hotel in Gentlemen's Walk, for the sum of £23,905.

=== Design and construction ===
The new hotel was designed by Boardman to be spacious, luxurious and to have installed the latest modern fixtures and fittings of the time. Boardman also incorporated into the design of the new hotel part of the interior decoration of the former solicitor's offices which had stood on the site. The offices had contained a particularly fine example of a plasterwork ceiling laid on oak lath measuring 17 feet (5.2 m) by 30 feet (9.1 m). This section of ceiling had been very carefully removed and was installed in the new first floor drawing room in the hotel, along with French casements to the balcony. The hotel was six storeys high which included a basement. Many of the front elevation windows were mullioned. Over the front entrance to the Hotel there is a balcony with intricately sculpted brick latticework. This exterior decorative brickwork is known as Costesseyware, with the materials for this work being supplied from the brick works of George Gunton in Costessey. These bricks are to be found on many building in and around Norwich and were used and promoted by local architects such as Boardman and George Skipper. This method of brickwork was easily rubbed and shaped to form intricate patterns and sculptures. The front elevation of the building is a built in a semicircular curve running from the top of Prince of Wales Road into Bank Plain and has three gable ends incorporated into the curve all of which have further alternating brickwork decorative detailing. The front elevation at street level was constructed from stone masonry of a colour to match the brickwork, which begins at the first lift at ground floor level. The roof of the hotel was originally tiled with green slate.

=== Interior ===
The interior fixtures and fitting of the hotel were of the most modern and up to date of the era and providing the very latest in technology and building standards, whilst the design intent was to create the feel of a comfortable country mansion. The hotel was fully electrified, and the staircases were fully fireproofed. The hotel also had a large ventilation shaft included in the design. The storeys were also connected by lifts which were installed by Laurence Scott & Co, who also installed the lighting and bells. Some of the hotel windows were illuminated with stained glass, fabricated by the Norwich firm of J & J King. The heating system and the Kitchen cookers and equipment were supplied by R. and A. Main of Edmonton, London. Boardman's design gave the hotel a total of 65 guest rooms over four of the storeys with the semi-circular shape of the frontage creating the attic bedrooms to have angular corners and sloping ceilings. The hotel's first floor dining room was to facilitate private dinners and wedding receptions and consisted of a suite which could accommodate twenty people. The basement floor contained the servants' hall, and included a pantry, pastry room and several kitchens along with a suite of rooms allocated to the plate man. There were also a plate room and office rooms, including a further bedroom.

=== Naming ===
The new hotel wanted to retain the name of Royal Hotel of the demolished hotel. The new company had to seek permission and approval for the Royal designation from the Sovereign. An application was sent to Queen Victoria at Balmoral for Her Gracious Majesty's permission, which was duly granted. The hotel owners also applied to the Norwich Brewster Sessions in August 1896 for a provisional licence to sell spirits and despite some objections from local restaurateurs a licence was granted. The Manager of the new Hotel was to be Mr. Charles Butcher who had previously managed the previous Royal Hotel in Norwich marketplace.

=== Opening ===
The Royal Hotel was officially opened on the 16 November 1897 with a grand luncheon which was hosted by the Company Chairman, Mr T. C. Blofield. There were one hundred and ten invited guests who included the Local Member of Parliament Sir Harry Bullard, many civic dignitaries, senior members of the local clergy, leading industrialists and many local businessmen. Sir Harry Bullard proposed a toast to the hotel's success and praised "the very elegant palace that had been erected". The contractors involved in the construction along with Mr Edward Boardman, Junior, the architect were all thanked and commended for bring the completion of the hotel ahead of its scheduled completion date.

=== Room tariffs ===
According to information quoted in a guidebook which was published for the hotel owners in 1899, room tariffs for a private suite in the hotel costs from 15 shillings. Each suite comprised a sitting-room, dressing room and bedroom and also included attendants. Single bedrooms were priced at 4 shillings. Patrons would also be required to pay extra charges for fires, lights and baths. The 1899 guidebook, which was printed for the hotel by Jarrolds & Sons, also described the main entrance of the hotel to contain marbles of various colours beyond which there was a winter garden with mosaic floor.

=== Heyday ===
For the first 75 years of the 20th century, the Royal was at the heart of the city's social and political life. The hotel hosted such events as socialite weddings, political and business conferences. The hotel was also popular for reunion lunches and also held occasional property auctions. Local MPs used the hotel's hospitality during election campaigns and was frequented by several prime ministers. In 1964 Conservative Prime Minister Harold Macmillan stayed at the hotel. On one occasion the Labour Prime Minister Harold Wilson and some members of his cabinet stayed at the hotel. He is recorded as not being very impressed with the hotel's beer and sent out to the Bank Tavern across the road for a beer more to his taste. The regional television company Anglia Television began its operations from the old Agricultural Hall, renaming it Anglia House, across the road from the hotel in 1959. For the next 20 years the hotel became popular with actors and actress who appeared in Anglia's network drama programmes or in their regular local series. The hotel was often used by the first chairman of Anglia Television, Lord George Townshend.

=== Decline ===
During the 1970s the hotel's fortunes began to fall into steep decline. This was mainly due to the fact that there have never been any car parking facilities at the Hotel nor was there any prospect of providing such facilities in the future, given the location and environs of the hotel. Things came to a head when the hotel's owners applied for planning permission to demolish the building and replace it with glass towered office block. The application was refused after much consultation. In 1977 the hotel was no longer receiving guests. The third and fourth floors of the hotel had been leased to Anglia Television as offices. The ground floor bar and restaurant continued in business but in March 1986 both these businesses closed down. Today the hotel is used as various offices and a business center.
