= Edward Boardman =

English architect (1833–1910)

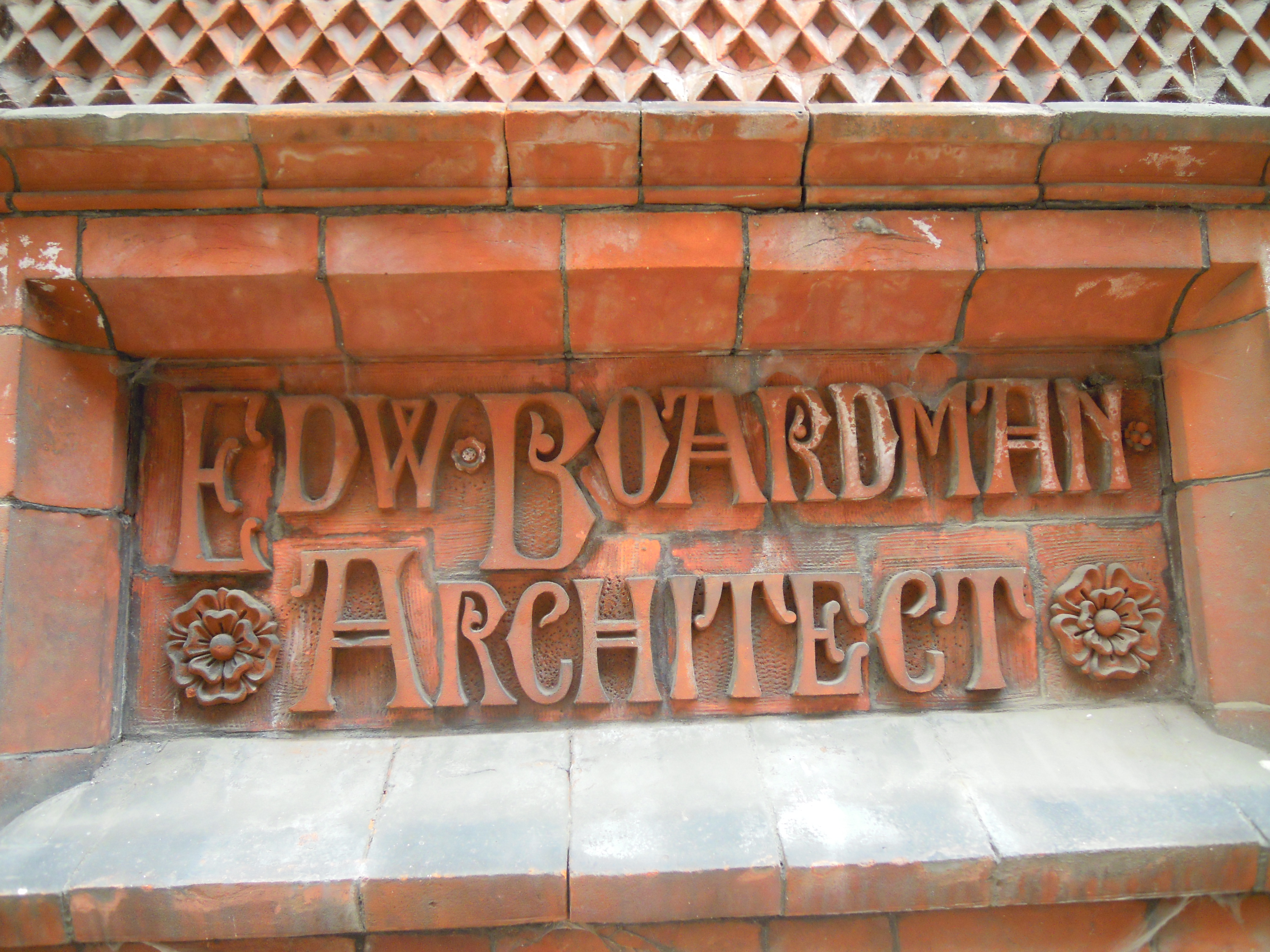
- Sign outside the former office of Edward Boardman in Norwich
- Born: Edward Boardman; 1833; Norwich, England
- Died: 1910 (aged 76–77); Norwich, England
- Occupation: Architect
- Practice: Boardman and Son
- Buildings: Refurbishment of Norfolk and Norwich Hospital; Conversion of Norwich Castle to museum

Edward Boardman (1833–1910) was a Norwich-born architect. He succeeded John Brown as the most successful Norwich architect in the second half of the 19th century. His work included both civic and ecclesiastical buildings, in addition to private commissions. Together, with his rival, George Skipper, he produced many notable buildings, with several standing to this day (2013).

== Career ==
Boardman received his early education at the Baptist school in Norwich founded by the father of John Sherren Brewer and E. Cobham Brewer. His school fellows included the headmaster's grandson Henry William Brewer, later a notable architectural illustrator, the clinician and physiologist Sydney Ringer and the orientalist Professor Robert Lubbock Bensly.

Boardman trained as an architect with the London-based company Lucas Brothers and was later articled with John Louth Clemence of Lowestoft. In 1860, he established his own practice in Norwich, before being accepted as a Fellow of the Royal Institute of British Architects (FRIBA) in 1871. From 1875, his offices were located at Old Bank of England Court, Queen Street, Norwich.

His major works in Norwich include the refurbishment of the Norfolk and Norwich Hospital, converting Norwich Castle into a museum, building the notable Royal Hotel and the mortuary chapel in the city's Rosary Cemetery. Outside of the city, he was responsible for the remodelling of Peckover House in Wisbech, the enlargement of Coltishall Primary School and in 1873, the building of the Dereham's Congregational Church are among his most notable works.

== Personal life ==
Boardman was born in Norwich in 1833 and lived at 91 Newmarket Road, Norwich to his death on 11 November 1910. He was elected Mayor of Norwich for 1905–1906. Boardman's son retired in 1933 and the practice continued until 1966.

== Family ==
His son Edward Thomas (also an architect) was born in 1862 and joined the family firm in 1889. He assumed control of the business in 1900. The younger Edward married Florence, a daughter of Jeremiah Colman and Caroline Colman members of the Colman's family. They bought the How Hill estate at Ludham, Norfolk and built How Hill House as a holiday home in 1904. They extended the house in 1915 and moved there permanently. Among their children were Humphrey who represented Great Britain in the 1928 Summer Olympics in the double sculls and Christopher, who won a gold medal at the 1936 Summer Olympics in the 6 metre yachting competition. The younger Edward's sister in law Ethel Colman was the first female Lord Mayor of Norwich in 1923.

One of Boardman's daughters, Ethel Marion, married Percy Jewson, who was Lord Mayor of Norwich 1934-35 and National Liberal MP for Great Yarmouth 1941–45,

== Works ==
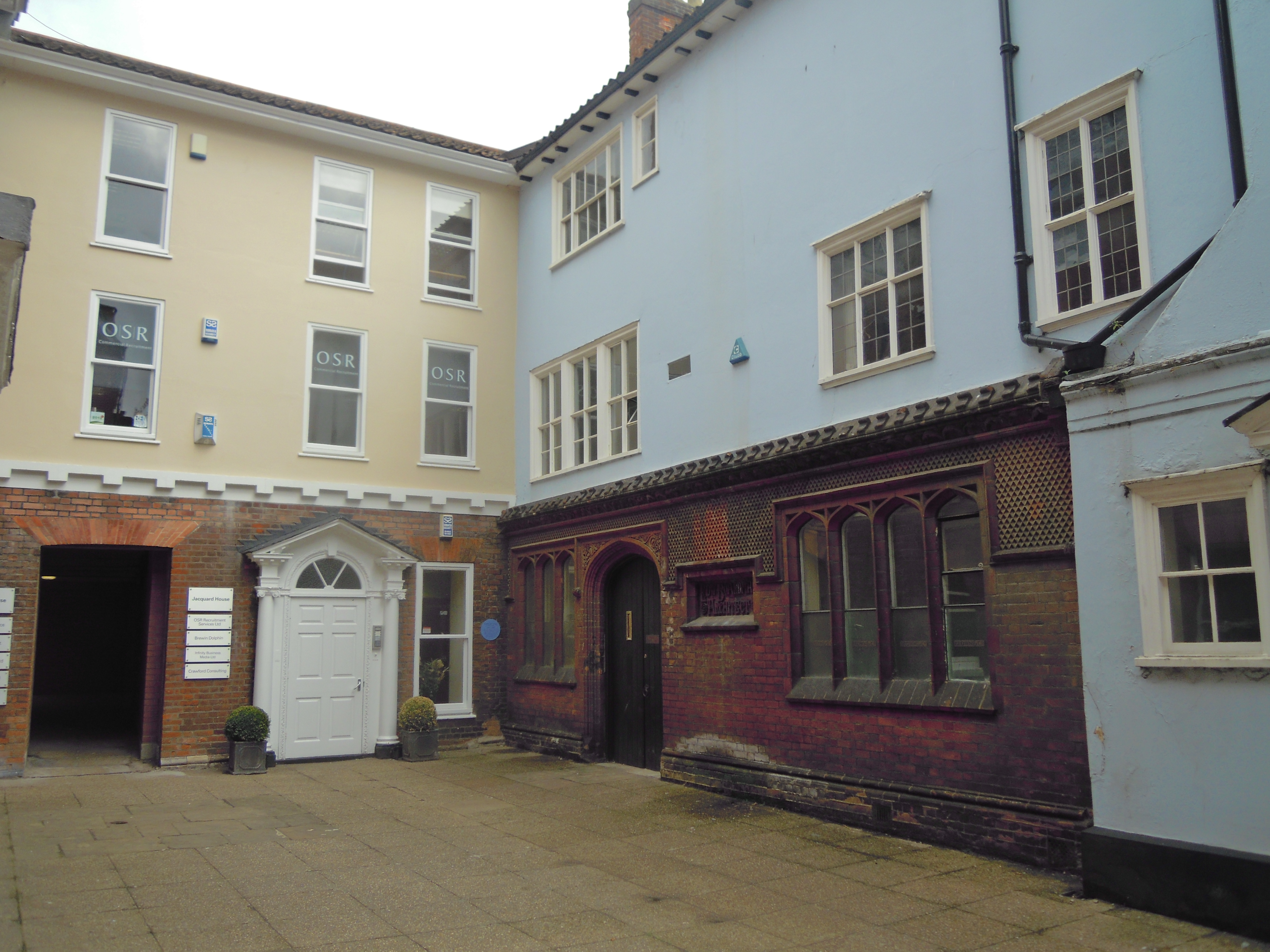
The former office of Edward Boardman located in Old Bank of England Court, Queen Street, Norwich

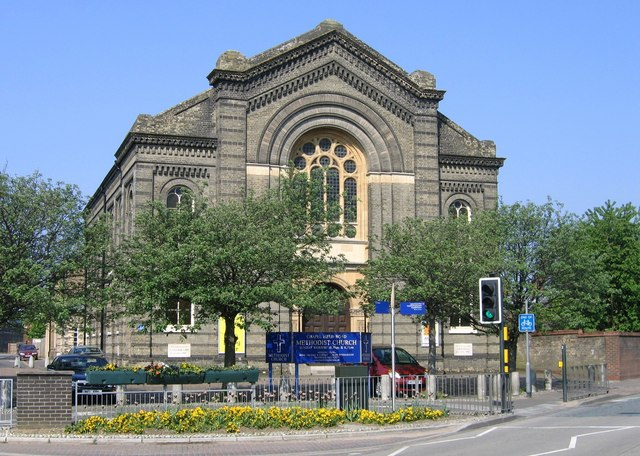
Chapelfield Road Methodist Church completed in 1880

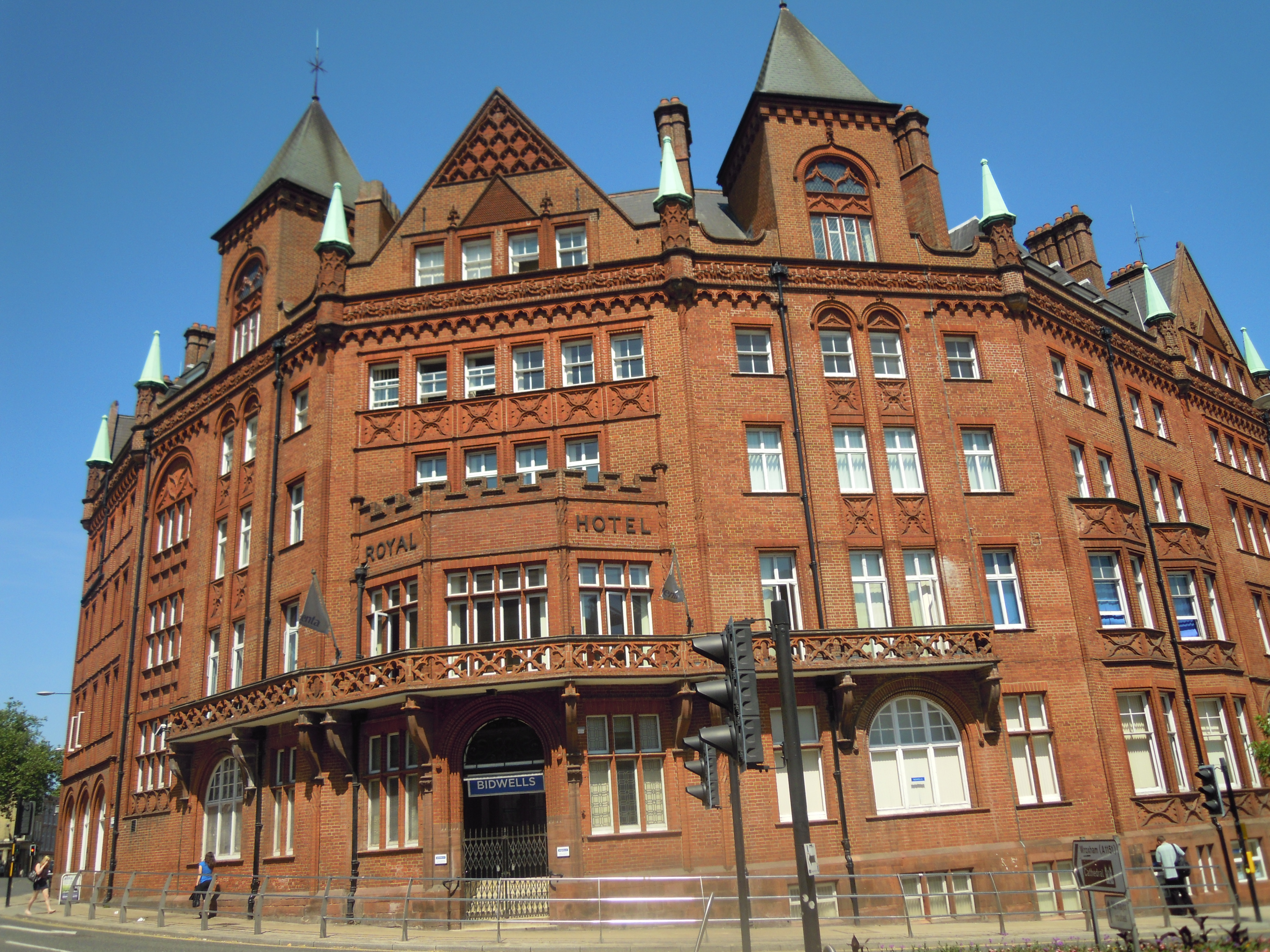
Former Royal Hotel located at Agricultural Hall Plain, Norwich built in 1897

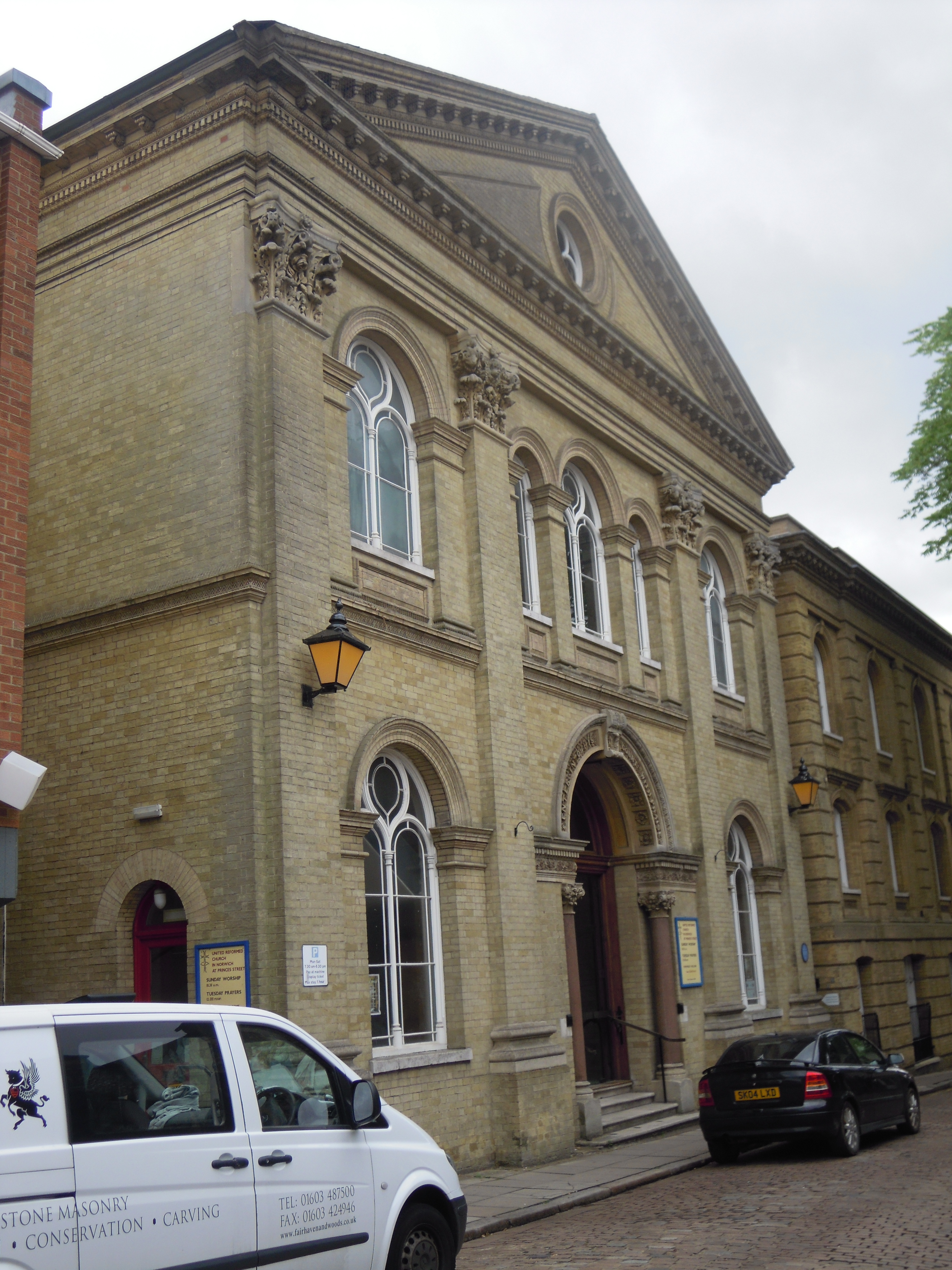
The United Reformed Church, Princes street, Norwich, Re-designed by Boardman in 1869

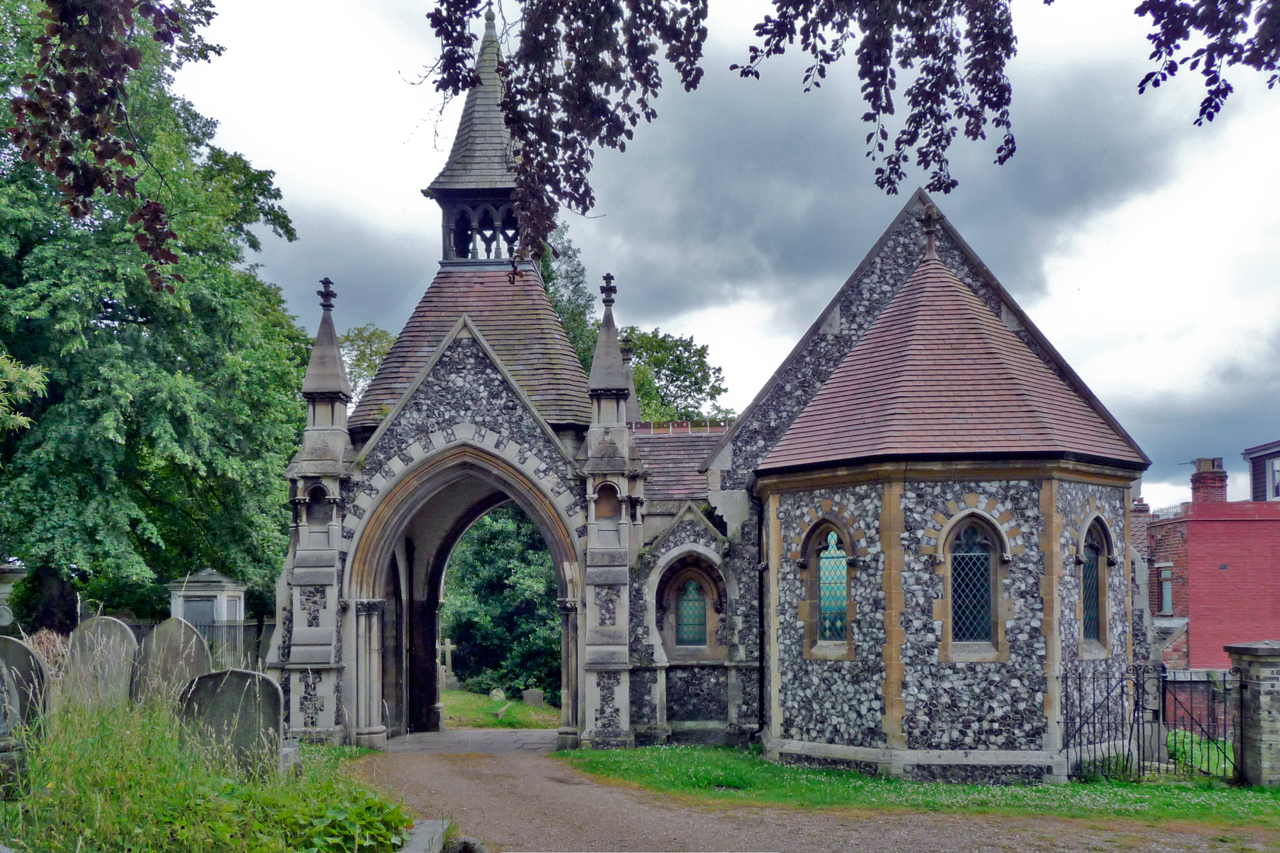
The Chapel at the Rosary cemetery, Norwich, completed in 1879

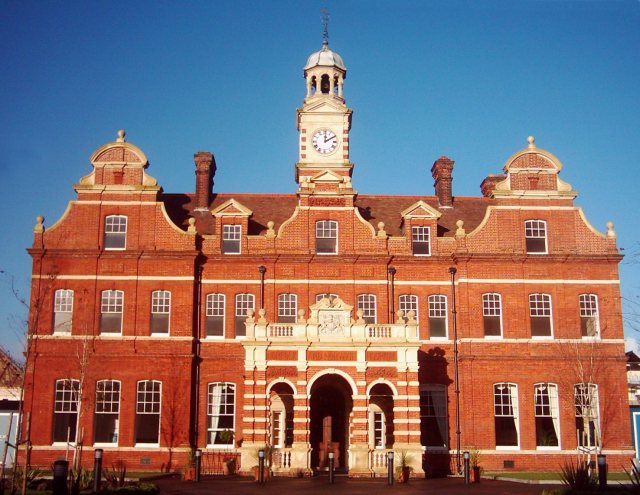
Norfolk and Norwich Hospital, Norwich, re-designed between 1879 and 1884

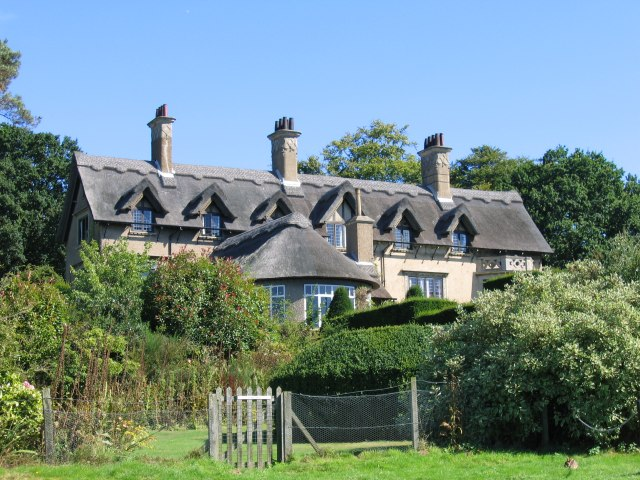
How Hill House, built in 1904

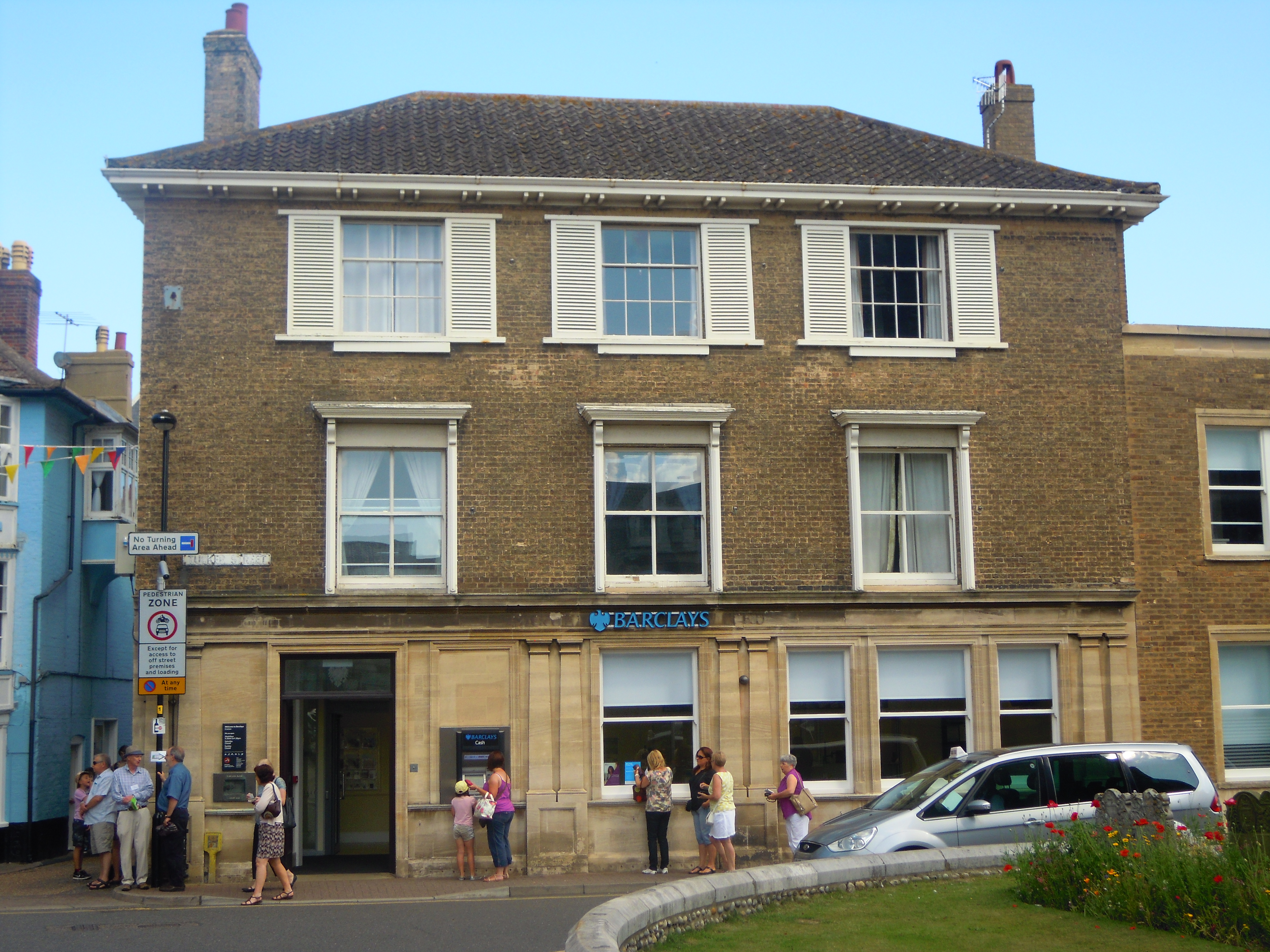
Barclays Bank, Cromer, was refurbished in 1902

=== Norwich ===
- Royal Hotel, Agricultural Hall Plain (1896–7)
- No. 5, Bank Plain (1899, office buildings)
- Bethel Hospital, Bethel Street (1899, extension)
- Castle Chambers, Castle Meadow (1877.
- Castle House, Castle Meadow (1874, printing works)
- Norwich Castle, Castle Meadow (1887, conversion from a gaol to a museum)
- Methodist Church, Chapelfield Road (1880)
- Houses and Villas on Chester Place (1869)
- Norvic Shoe Factory, Duke Street (1879, extension)
- St. Mary's Baptist Church, Duke Street (1868, destroyed during the Second World War)
- St. Edmund's Church, Fishergate (1882, restoration)
- No. 8 Gentlemen's Walk (1877, formerly piano warehouse)
- No. 12, Gentlemen's Walk (1870, a branch of Halifax Bank)
- Caleys Department Store, High Street (1889, destroyed during the Second World War)
- St. Etheldreda's Church, King Street (1883, restoration)
- No. 57, London Street (1899, former office of the Eastern Daily Press)
- Alexandra Mansions, Prince of Wales Road (1890s)
- Congregational Church, Prince's Street was (1869, redesigned by Boardman)
- Gothic Mortuary Chapel, Rosary Cemetery (1879)
- Norfolk and Norwich Hospital, St. Stephen's Road (1879–1884, rebuilding)
- Baptist Church, Unthank Road (1875, demolished in 1955)
- The Norfolk Club Coffee Room, Upper King Street (1888)

=== Norfolk ===
- Coltishall Primary School, Coltishall (1875–77, enlargement)
- Barclay's Bank Building, Cromer (1902–3)
- Cambridge House Hotel, Cromer (1887)
- Fletcher Convalescent Home, Cromer (1893)
- Red Lion Hotel, Cromer (1887)
- Vernon House, Cromer (1877–8)
- The Congregational Church, Dereham (1873)
- Dunston Hall, Dunston (1878)
- Harbord House, Overstrand (1878–9)
- Church of St. Mary & St. Margaret, Sprowston (1886–90)
- Stoke Hall, Stoke Holy Cross (1890, alterations and improvements)
- Crown Point, Trowse (1866)
- Dales Country House Hotel, Upper Sheringham (1913–14)
- Methodist Church, Wymondham (1871)

=== Cambridgeshire ===
- Peckover House, Wisbech (1877–78, additions)
