= Red Lion Hotel, Cromer =

Hotel in Cromer, Norfolk, England

Red Lion Hotel
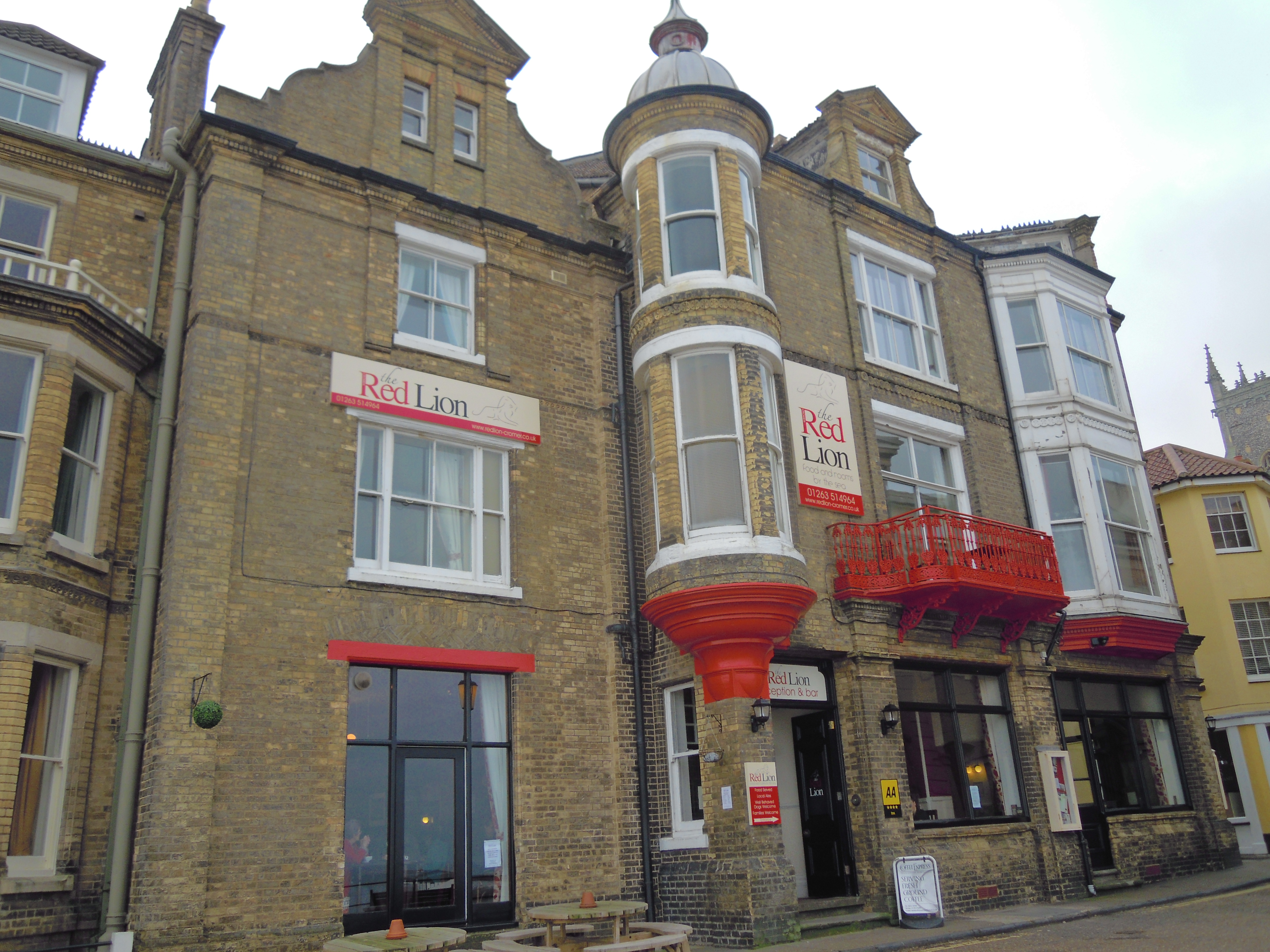

- Norfolk

General information
- Location: Cromer, North Norfolk, Norfolk, England, Brook Street; Cromer; Norfolk; NR27 9HG
- Coordinates: 52°55′58.43″N 1°17′34.75″E
- Opening: 1766 (Recorded the landlord as Sherman Cutler)

Design and construction
- Architect: Edward Boardman

Other information
- Number of rooms: 14
- Parking: yes but limited

Website
- Hotel website

The Red Lion Hotel is an AA 4-star hotel located in the English seaside town of Cromer in the county of Norfolk, United Kingdom.

== Location ==
The Red Lion Hotel sits on the junction of Tucker Street and Brook Street in the centre of Cromer. The hotel sits on the cliff top above the fisherman’s beach and has commanding views across the sea and the town's Victorian pier. The hotel is 0.7 miles (1.1 km) from the railway station. The nearest airport is in Norwich, which is 20.2 miles (32.5 km) south of Cromer.

== Description ==
The hotel has 14 en-suite rooms in total, most of which have a sea view. The reception area is on the ground floor of the hotel. There is a large bar with a spacious lounge which is open to guests and non-residents. The bar has a good range of beers including several locally brewed real ales. The hotel is a member of CAMRA and is listed in the AA Good Pub Guide.

== History ==
The Red Lion is one of the oldest inns in the town of Cromer. The first recorded inn keeper was Sherman Cutler in 1766. The current hotel was rebuilt on the site of much older hostelry in 1887 by a Mr John Smith of London. The building has evolved over the years to the building seen today. During this re-build the site was extended with the acquisition and demolition of several fishermen's cottages at the rear of the inn. These were replaced by assembly rooms which still form part of the hotel today. Some documentation suggests that the 1887 works were carried out by local builder George Riches.

Owners, Managers & Licensees of the Red Lion Hotel
Year	Name
1766	Sherman Cutler
1770	Frank Parsons (For Ye Red Lion)
1771	Francis Parsons
1778	Robert Webb
1803	Rose Webb (Robert Webb's widow)
1830	Thomas Webb
1836	Ann Webb
1849	
1854	Thomas Robert Webb
1875	Mrs. Charlotte Webb
1883	Edmund Balls
1887	Mr. John Smith
1900	George Baxter
1903	Charles Mann
1907	Henry Thompson
1930	Harry Herbert Willis
1931	Richard Owen Goddard
1940	Mrs. Celia Lovell
1947	J.J. Kemp
1951	F.W.O. Dingle
1954	Thomas A. Bolton (purchased from estate of John Smith)
1984	Reginald Medlar

This list appears to be incorrect and incomplete. A more accurate list of licensees can be found for the Red Lion Cromer on norfolkpubs.co.uk.

== Gallery ==
Red Lion Hotel

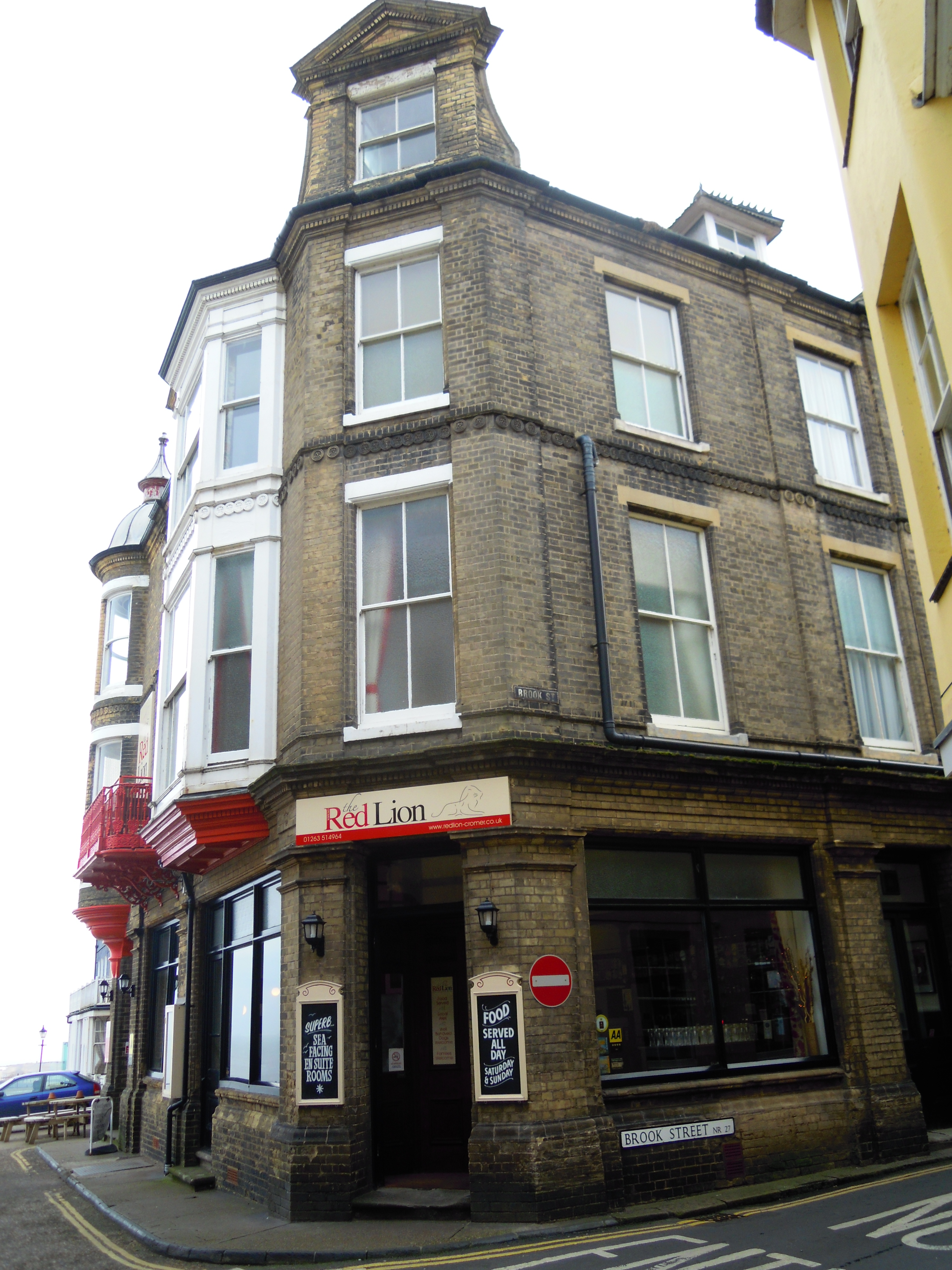
Brook Street elevation
