= Christopher Boardman =

British sailor (1903–1987)

Personal information
- Born: 11 June 1903
- Died: 29 September 1987 (aged 84)

Sailing career
- Sport: Sailing
Medal record
Sailing
Representing Great Britain
Olympic Games
Gold medal – first place	1936 Berlin	6 metre class

Christopher Alan Boardman (11 June 1903 Norwich – 29 September 1987) was a British sailor who won gold in the 1936 Summer Olympics.

In 1936, he was a crew member and helmsman of the British boat Lalage which won the gold medal in the 6 metre class. As gold medallist he was presented with an oak sapling which he planted at How Hill.

In 1934, Boardman was a member of the crew of the British J-class yacht Endeavour which competed in the America's Cup off the coast of Rhode Island. The Endeavour won the first two races but lost the remaining three.

In World War II, he saw service as a Royal Naval Volunteer Reserve officer. In 1940/41 he served on the Q-ship HMS Cyprus (X44) (formerly Cape Sable) and later commanded the corvette HMS Snowdrop.

His younger brother, Humphrey, rowed in the double scull event at the 1928 Olympic games and won double gold at the 1930 British Empire Games. Their father, Edward Thomas Boardman, was a Norwich architect, as was, their grandfather Edward Boardman. Their mother, Florence, was a daughter of J J Colman of the Colman's Mustard family. The family home was at How Hill in the Norfolk village of Ludham.
