= Dales Country House Hotel, Upper Sheringham =

Country house hotel in Norfolk, England

Dales Country House Hotel
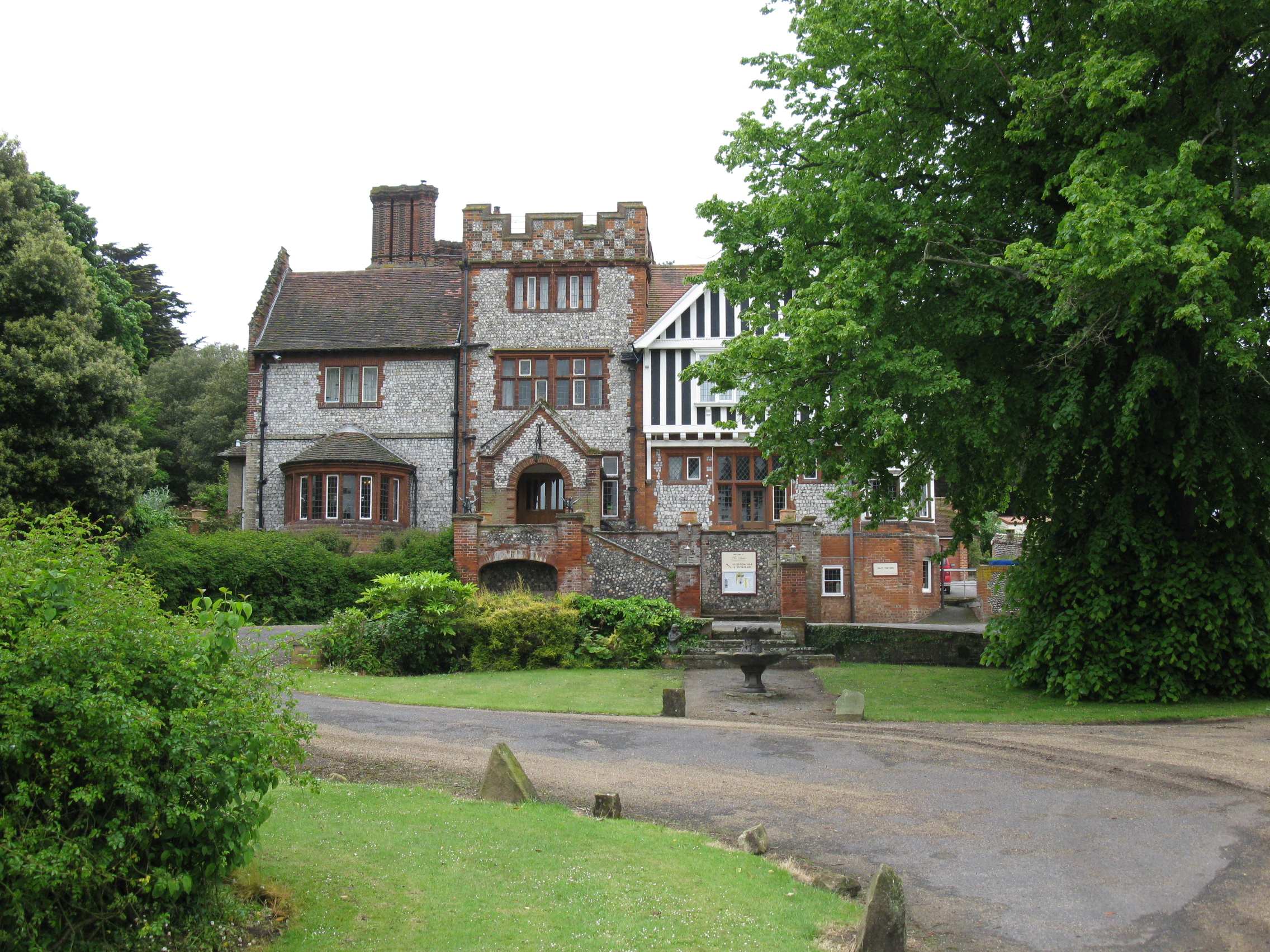
- The Dales Country House Hotel

- Norfolk
- Hotel chain: Mackenzie Hotel Group

General information
- Location: Upper Sheringham, North Norfolk, England, Lodge Hill; Upper Sheringham; Sheringham; NR26 8TJ
- Coordinates: 52°55′53.39″N 1°11′4.77″E
- Opening: 2001

Design and construction
- Architect: Edward Boardman

Other information
- Number of rooms: 21 bedrooms
- Number of restaurants: 1

Listed Building – Grade II
- Designated: 30 September 1987
- Reference no.: 1373503

The Dales Country House Hotel is a grade II listed building which is in the English coastal village of Upper Sheringham in the county of Norfolk, United Kingdom. The hotel is also an AA 4-star hotel. The hotel also has 2 AA Rosettes for Food.

== Location ==
The hotel is located on the western edge of the village of Upper Sheringham and is on the eastern edge of Sheringham Park. The hotel is 1.5 miles (2.4 km) south west of the seaside town of Sheringham and is 26.9 miles (43.3 km) north of the city of Norwich. The nearest station to the hotel is at Sheringham and is 1.4 miles (2.3 km) away. The nearest airport is in Norwich and is23.7 miles (38.1 km) south of the hotel.

== History ==
The building was built in a Vernacular style, between 1913 and 1914 and was designed by Norwich architect Edward Boardman. This building replaced an older structure which had been a Victorian rectory. The rectory had been acquired by Commodore Henry Douglas King, MP in 1910. It was King who had Boardman design and build the building seen today. Boardman's designed the oak paneled and Edwardian interior decoration and features that still survive today. During the First World War and the period just after Commodore King allowed his house to be used as a convalescent hospital for wounded soldiers. The commodore was killed in 1930 aboard his yacht Islander which had sunk in a gale off Fowey, Cornwall. After his death, the house was the home of Major William James Spurrell, a member of a local landowning family, until 1948, when it was acquired by Norfolk County Council for use as a residential home.

=== Hotel ===
In 2000 Norfolk County Council closed the residential home, and put the house up for sale. The building and its four acres of garden were sold to the Mackenzie family who decided to turn the house into a hotel.
