= Olympic oaks =

Trees awarded to gold medalists during 1936 Olympic Games

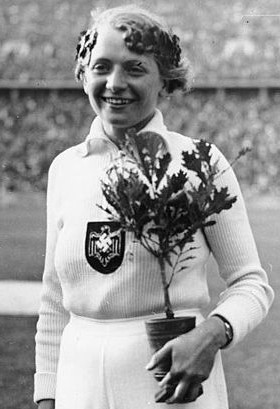
Tilly Fleischer with her oak

The Olympic oaks, informally called Hitler oaks, are English oak trees that were given to gold medal winners of the 1936 Berlin Olympic Games. 130 gold medals and trees, which were year-old saplings, were awarded. Several have survived.

== Germany ==
While the largest number of oaks were given to German athletes, who won the most medals, many are said to be planted near the stadium, though no record was kept, and they would be difficult to identify among the many oaks in the vicinity.

== The Netherlands ==
The Netherlands has 2 Olympic oaks planted at the Olympic Stadium in Amsterdam.

== New Zealand ==
- Jack Lovelock's tree is at Timaru Boys' High School.

== South Korea ==
- Sohn Kee-chung's tree is at his memorial hall, Malli-dong, Seoul.

== Sweden ==
- Ivar Johansson's tree is in Folkparken, Norrköping. The tree was first planted in Johansson's private garden, but in 1960 it was donated to the city of Norrköping.

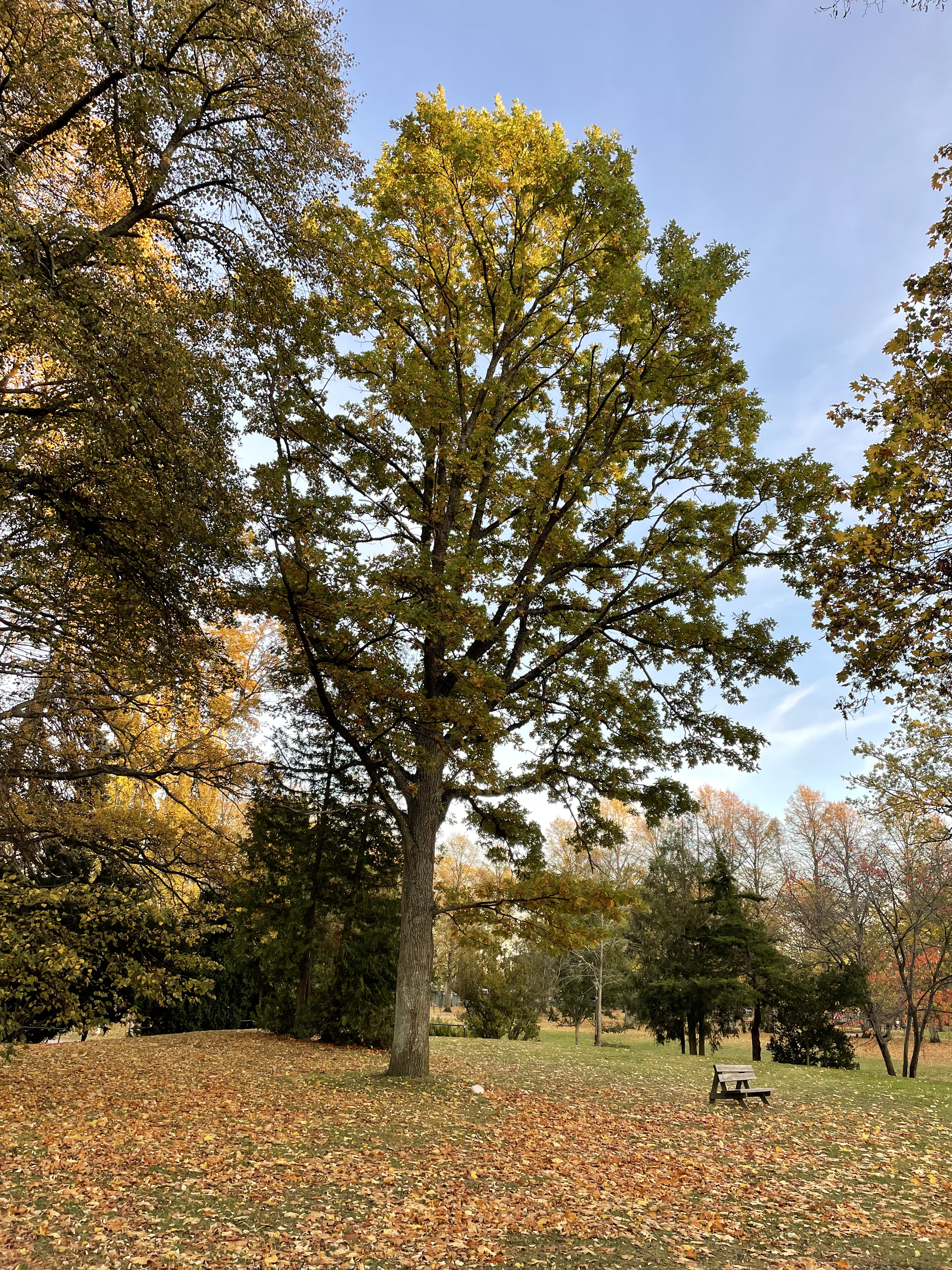
Ivar Johansson's Olympic Oak in Norrköping, Sweden

== United Kingdom ==
- The sapling presented to Jack Beresford was planted in the grounds of Bedford School. It was removed many years later when building work was undertaken. The wood was used to make presentation shields for the rowing club.
- Harold Whitlock's sapling was presented to Hendon School. It was removed due to fungal disease in July 2007.
- Christopher Boardman's oak was planted in How Hill, Norfolk but was eventually killed by honey fungus. In early 2017 the remaining stump was carved into a sailing boat and Olympic rings.

== United States ==
- Ken Carpenter was a student at the University of Southern California (USC). His Olympic Oak was planted on the main USC campus where it grows behind Bovard Auditorium.
- Foy Draper's tree was planted near Carpenter's on the USC campus. It died from root rot in 2002.
- Cornelius Johnson's tree is still standing in the yard of his childhood home in Koreatown, Los Angeles, as of 2025.
- Jesse Owens won four gold medals and received four trees. One tree was planted at James Rhodes High School in Cleveland, Ohio, dying during the winter of 2021–22; saplings were created from grafts of that tree and as of 2026 many were located at Holden Arboretum in Kirtland, Ohio as well as other places around Northeast Ohio. Another may have been planted at Ohio State University, a third was planted at the University of Southern California, and a fourth was at the home of Jesse Owens's mother but was removed when the house was demolished.
- Forrest Towns' tree was originally planted outside Sanford Stadium on the University of Georgia campus. During stadium renovations in 1967, the tree was transplanted to another location on campus, but died soon after.
- John Woodruff (Connellsville, Pennsylvania) was the first African American to win gold in the 1936 Olympics (800 Meters). He brought his oak home to Connellsville and planted it in the northwest corner of the High School Stadium (Campbell Field) in Connellsville where it was still standing as of 2025.

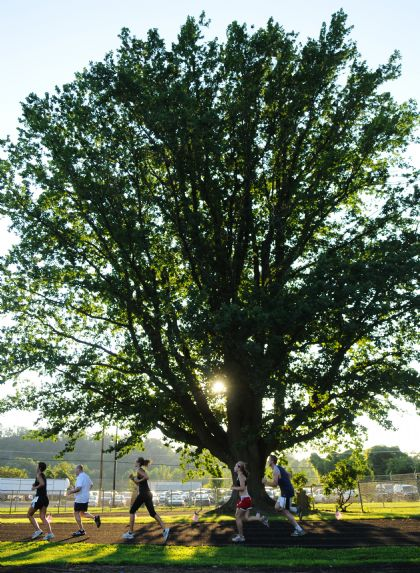
Woodruff's Olympic Oak in Connellsville, PA

== See also ==
- Forest swastikas, arboreal relics of Nazi Germany
