= How Hill, Norfolk =

Hamlet in Ludham parish, Norfolk, England

Coordinates: 52.7176°N 1.5083°E

How Hill
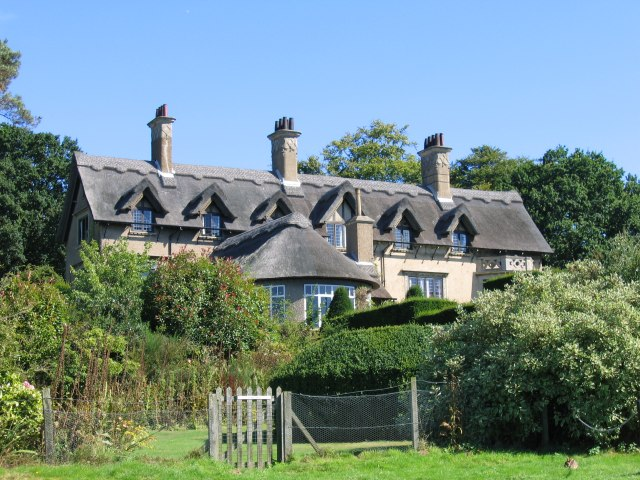
- How Hill House

- Location within Norfolk
- Civil parish: Ludham
- District: North Norfolk
- Shire county: Norfolk
- Region: East
- Country: England
- Sovereign state: United Kingdom
- Police: Norfolk
- Fire: Norfolk
- Ambulance: East of England

How Hill is a hamlet in Ludham parish, in the North Norfolk district, in the county of Norfolk, England. It is on the River Ant within The Broads National Park.

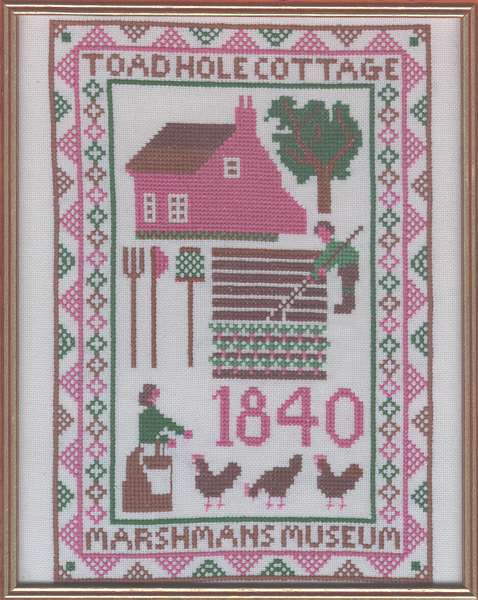
An embroidery inspired by Toad Hole Museum

How Hill House, completed in 1903, was designed by Thomas Boardman, son of the architect Edward Boardman; he was Mayor of Norwich in 1905–1906. Since 1984 the house has been the home of How Hill Trust, an educational charity. The gardens are periodically open to the public.

The How Hill Nature Reserve is administered by the Broads Authority.

Toad Hole Museum occupies a former marshman's cottage, and also houses the Broads Information Centre.

Boardman's Windmill is a trestle or skeleton windpump, and Clayrack Drainage Mill is similar, only smaller. Just south of How Hill is Turf Fen windpump.
