= Grade I and II* listed buildings in the London Borough of Croydon =

There are over 9,000 Grade I listed buildings and 20,000 Grade II* listed buildings in England. This page is a list of these buildings in the London Borough of Croydon.

== Grade I ==
Name	Location	Type	Completed (Note: The date given is the date used by Historic England as significant for the initial building or that of an important part in the structure's description.)	Date designated	Grid ref. (Note: Sometimes known as OSGB36, the grid reference is based on the British national grid reference system used by the Ordnance Survey.) Geo-coordinates	Entry number (Note: The "List Entry Number" is a unique number assigned to each listed building and scheduled monument by Historic England.)	Image
Church of All Saints	Sanderstead	Church	Late 13th century	20 May 1954	TQ3413861485; 51°20′12″N 0°04′33″W	1079341	Church of All Saints More images
Church of St John the Evangelist	Coulsdon	Church	1250	20 May 1954	TQ3127358187; 51°18′28″N 0°07′05″W	1188464	Church of St John the Evangelist More images
Church of St Mary Addington	Croydon	Church	1080	29 January 1951	TQ3710463991; 51°21′30″N 0°01′56″W	1079343	Church of St Mary Addington More images
Hospital of the Holy Trinity (Whitgift Hospital)	Croydon	Almshouses	1599	29 January 1951	TQ3232565584; 51°22′26″N 0°06′01″W	1188846	Hospital of the Holy Trinity (Whitgift Hospital) More images
Old Palace School (Croydon Palace)	Croydon	Archbishop's palace	15th century	29 January 1951	TQ3197065392; 51°22′20″N 0°06′20″W	1079296	Old Palace School (Croydon Palace) More images
Church of St John the Baptist	Croydon	Church	15th century	29 January 1951	TQ3193665440; 51°22′22″N 0°06′21″W	1079319	Church of St John the Baptist More images
Church of St Michael and All Angels	Croydon	Church	1880–85	20 May 1954	TQ3226366068; 51°22′42″N 0°06′03″W	1079297	Church of St Michael and All Angels More images

== Grade II* ==
Name	Location	Type	Completed	Date designated	Grid ref. Geo-coordinates	Entry number	Image
Addington Palace (Royal School of Church Music)	Croydon	House	1772	29 January 1951	TQ3636963609; 51°21′19″N 0°02′35″W	1358819	Addington Palace (Royal School of Church Music) More images
Airport House	Croydon	Airport terminal	1928	1 August 1978	TQ3116663615; 51°21′23″N 0°07′03″W	1188970	Airport House More images
Church of St Augustine	Croydon	Church	1881–84	29 October 1976	TQ3242463237; 51°21′10″N 0°05′59″W	1079301	Church of St Augustine More images
Church of St James	Croydon	Church	1829	29 October 1976	TQ3266766451; 51°22′54″N 0°05′42″W	1294484	Church of St James More images
St John the Evangelist	Upper Norwood	Church	1878–87	29 October 1976	TQ3360969805; 51°24′42″N 0°04′49″W	1079275	St John the Evangelist More images
Church of St Mary Magdalene	Addiscombe	Church	1868	29 October 1976	TQ3353166011; 51°22′39″N 0°04′58″W	1358794	Church of St Mary Magdalene More images
Church of the Holy Innocents, and boundary wall	Croydon	Church	1894–95	29 November 1976	TQ3369768196; 51°23′49″N 0°04′46″W	1079303	Church of the Holy Innocents, and boundary wall More images
Wrencote House	Croydon	House	Late 17th century	29 January 1951	TQ3238265149; 51°22′12″N 0°05′59″W	1079291	Wrencote House More images
Croydon War Memorial	Croydon	War memorial	1921	19 November 1973	TQ3239265405; 51°22′20″N 0°05′58″W	1268438	Croydon War Memorial More images
