= St Mary's Church, Addington =

St Mary's Church
- Church of St Mary the Blessed Virgin
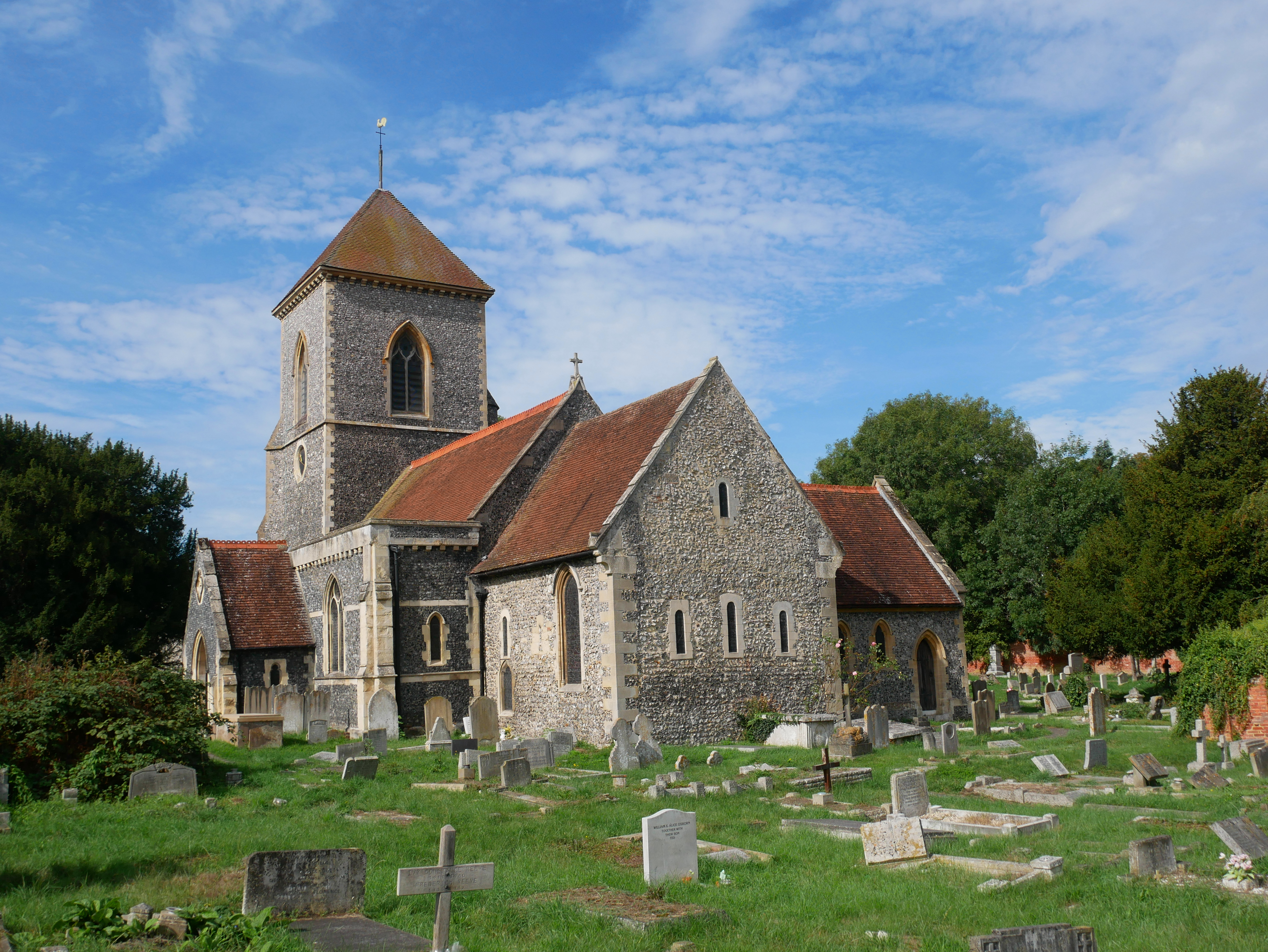
- Southeast view of the Church of Saint Mary, Addington
- St Mary's Church
- 51.358453°N 0.032254°W
- Location: Addington, London Borough of Croydon, Greater London
- Country: England
- Denomination: Church of England
- Churchmanship: Modern Catholic
- Website: www.addington.org.uk

History
- Status: Parish church
- Dedication: St Mary the Blessed Virgin

Architecture
- Functional status: Active
- Heritage designation: Grade I listed
- Designated: 29 January 1951

Administration
- Diocese: Diocese of Southwark
- Archdeaconry: Archdeaconry of Croydon
- Deanery: Croydon Addington
- Parish: Parish of Addington

Clergy
- Bishop(s): Jonathan Clark, Bishop of Croydon
- Vicar: The Revd Debbie Forman

The Church of St Mary the Blessed Virgin is an Anglican church in Addington, in the Borough of Croydon, London. It is associated with the Archbishops of Canterbury of the 19th century, who lived at nearby Addington Palace: five of the archbishops are buried at the church.

== History ==
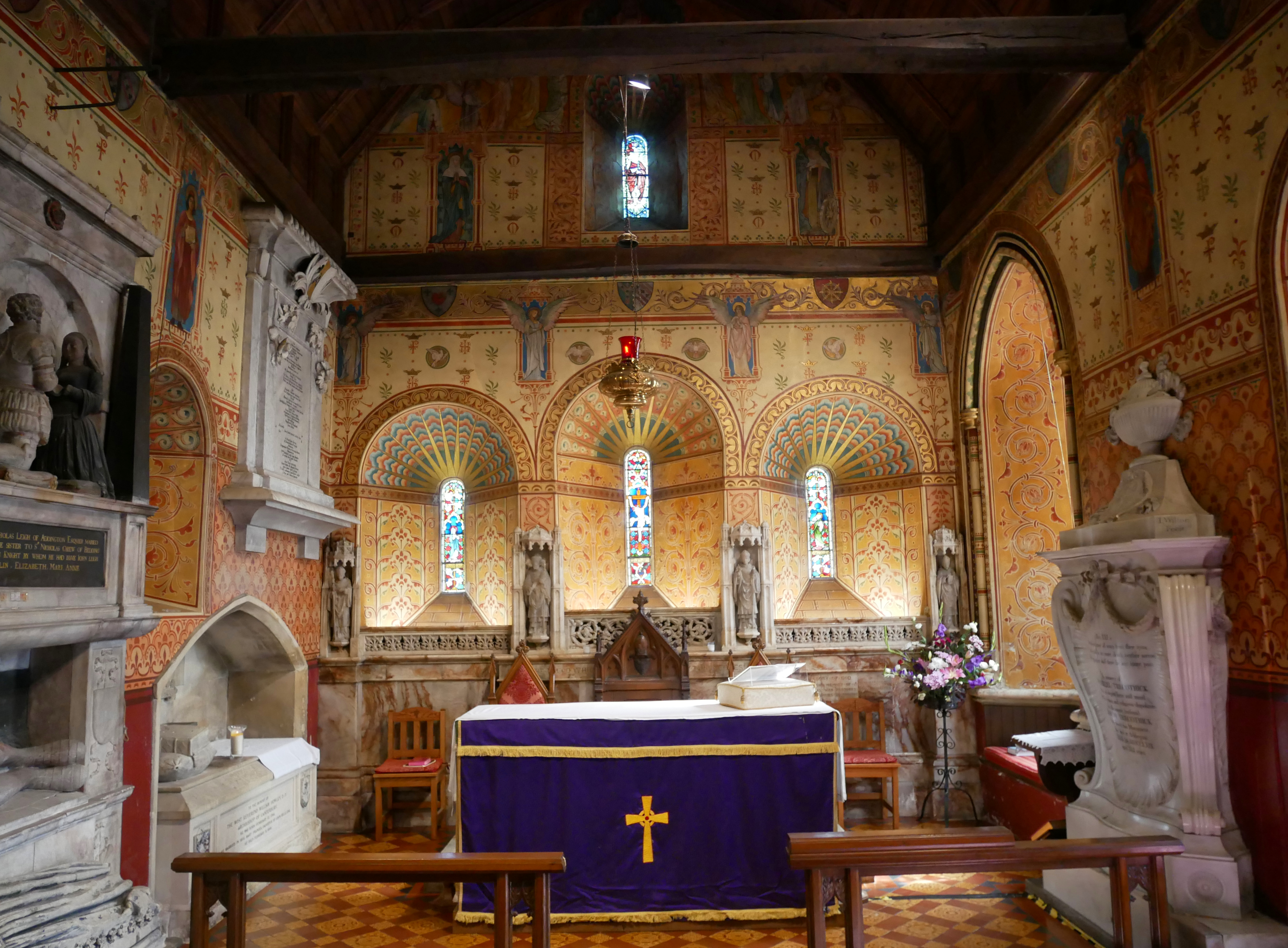
The chancel of the Church of Saint Mary

There is evidence for a church on this site since at least 1080 AD. It was once the only church in Addington village when it was the centre of a larger parish then incorporating Shirley. It has an 11th-century chancel and windows. The south aisle, built in the early 13th century, is narrow as it once had a thatched roof, hence its falling roofline. The belltower assumed its current form in 1876. The church tower has a belfry with 6 bells, the earliest probably dating from 1380 as well as two 17th-century bells. The bells were restored in 1957. The chancel was richly decorated in 1898 in memory of Archbishop Edward White Benson.

On 29 January 1951, St Mary's became a Grade I listed building.

The parish was part of the Diocese of Canterbury until 1984 when it joined the Diocese of Southwark.

=== Notable burials ===
The crypt is now inaccessible, but the church is the burial place of a Lord Mayor of the City of London, the armigerous Leigh family who were Lords of the manor, and five of the six Archbishops of Canterbury who spent time at their residence nearby of Addington Palace.

There is a memorial to the archbishops buried here in the graveyard. The archbishops interred at St Mary's are:

- Archbishop Charles Manners-Sutton – died 1828 (buried in a vault under the vestry).
- Archbishop William Howley – died 1848 (buried in the chancel).
- Archbishop John Bird Sumner – died 1862 (buried in the churchyard).
- Archbishop Charles Longley – died 1868 (buried in the churchyard).
- Archbishop Archibald Campbell Tait – died 1882 (buried in the churchyard).

Other burials include:

- Henry Selfe (1810–1870), member of the Canterbury Association

The churchyard also contains Commonwealth war graves of thirteen service personnel, four from World War I and nine from World War II. (The CWGC site shows 14, but one of these, J. Collier, is identified as the alias of another entry, J. Rostron).

=== Home Guard Memorial ===
There is a stained glass window serving as a memorial to the services of the 59th (Addington) Battalion of the Home Guard during the Second World War.

- Above the double window is a small circular window bearing the Paschal Lamb emblem of the Queen's Royal Regiment (West Surrey), along with their motto "Pristinae Virtutis Memor".
- At the top of the double windows (spread over both) is a biblical verse "Everyone had his sword by his side and so builded. Neh. 4 v 18".
- At the bottom, again spread over the two windows, is the dedication: "To the Glory of God and as a memorial of their service to King and Country by members of the 59th Surrey (Addington) Battalion Home Guard, this window is erected. 1952."

== Present day ==
Now the church ministers to the people living in the more immediate vicinity that includes Addington village, the southern elevation of and escarpment running down from the Addington Hills, the residences along Fieldway on the northernmost part of the New Addington estate, Addington and Forestdale.

The church stands in the Modern Catholic tradition of the Church of England.

== Notable clergy ==
- John Cavell was a curate here between 1947 and 1949, he later became Bishop of Southampton
- Michael Perham was a curate here between 1976 and 1981, he later became Bishop of Gloucester

== Images ==
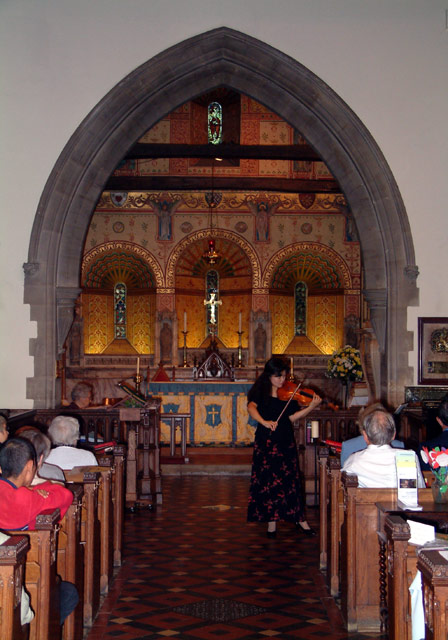
The chancel

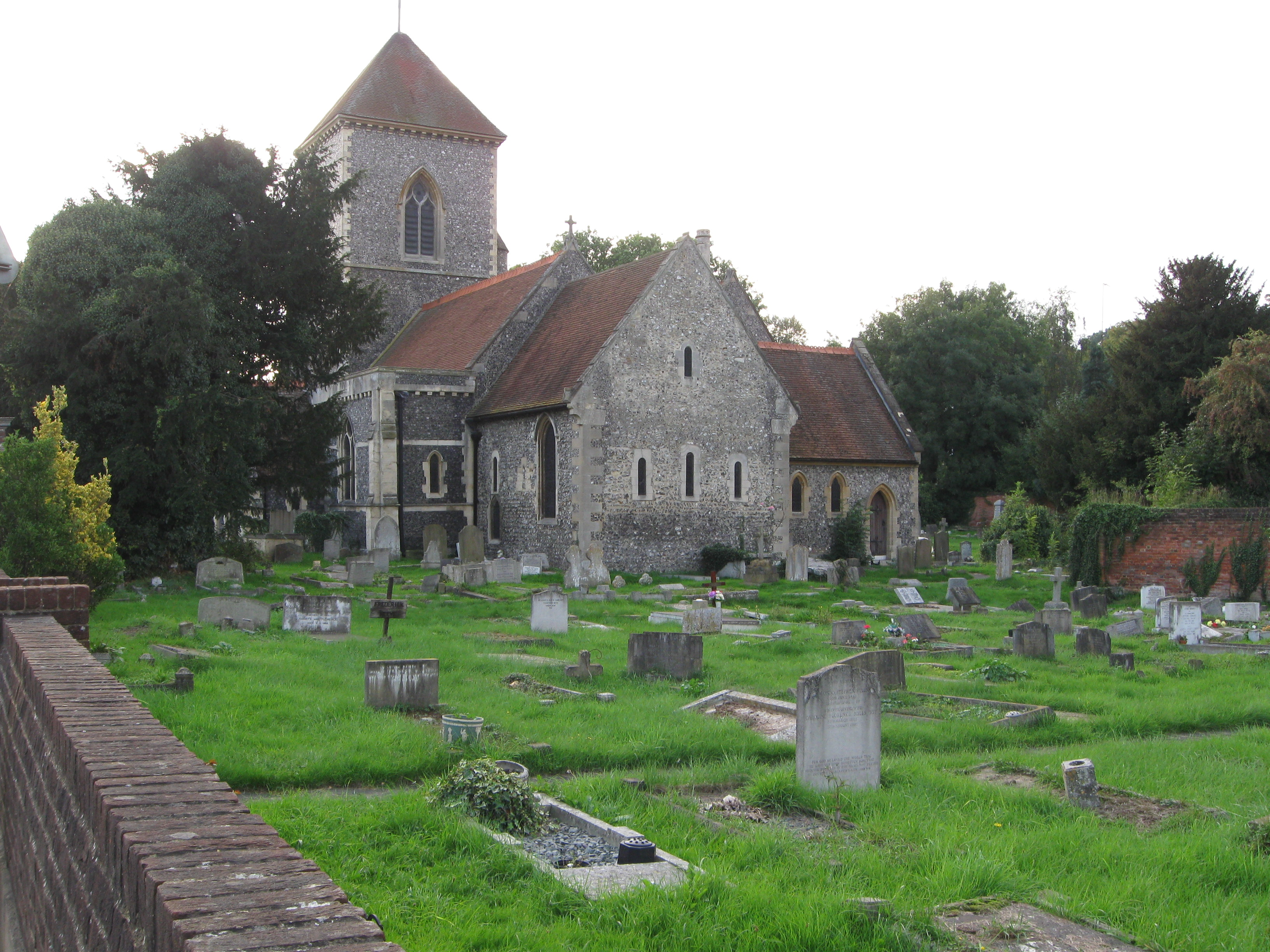
The graveyard

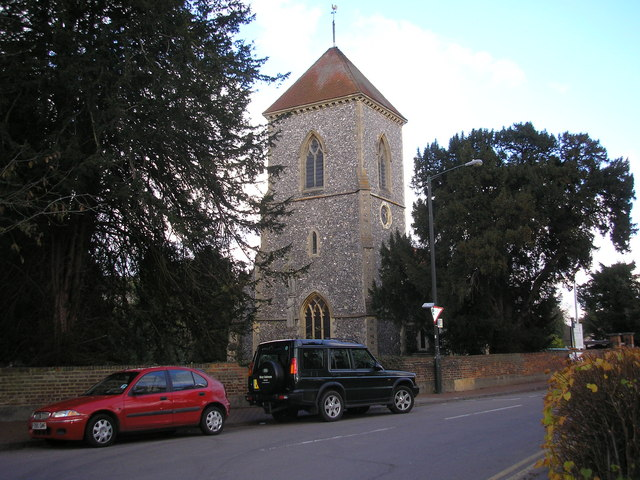
View from the road

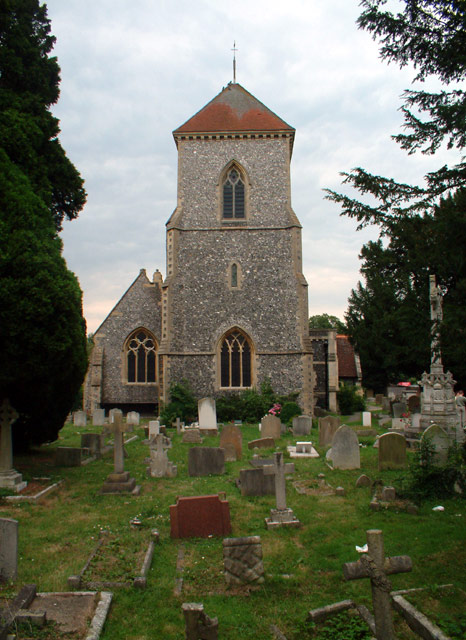
View from the west

The Home Guard Memorial Window
