= St John the Evangelist, Upper Norwood =

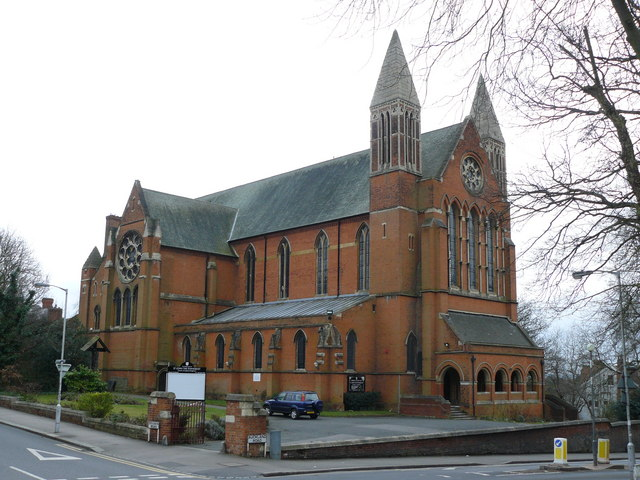

- Location of St John the Evangelist
- 51.411504°N 0.080056°W
- Location: 1 Sylvan Road, Upper Norwood, London, SE19 2RX
- Country: England
- Denomination: Church of England
- Churchmanship: Inclusive Catholic
- Website: Church website

History
- Status: Active
- Founded: 6 May 1878
- Dedication: John the Evangelist
- Consecrated: 30 April 1887

Architecture
- Functional status: Parish church
- Heritage designation: Grade II* listed
- Architect: John Loughborough Pearson
- Style: Gothic revival architecture
- Years built: 1878 and 1887

Administration
- Diocese: Diocese of Southwark
- Archdeaconry: Archdeaconry of Croydon
- Deanery: Croydon North
- Parish: Upper Norwood

Clergy
- Vicar: Fr John Pritchard

The Church of St John the Evangelist is a Church of England church in Upper Norwood, a suburb of South London, in the United Kingdom. It is a Grade II* listed red brick Gothic Revival church which was built between 1878 and 1887 by the English architect John Loughborough Pearson (1817–97). The church is dedicated to the Christian saint, John the Evangelist.

== History ==
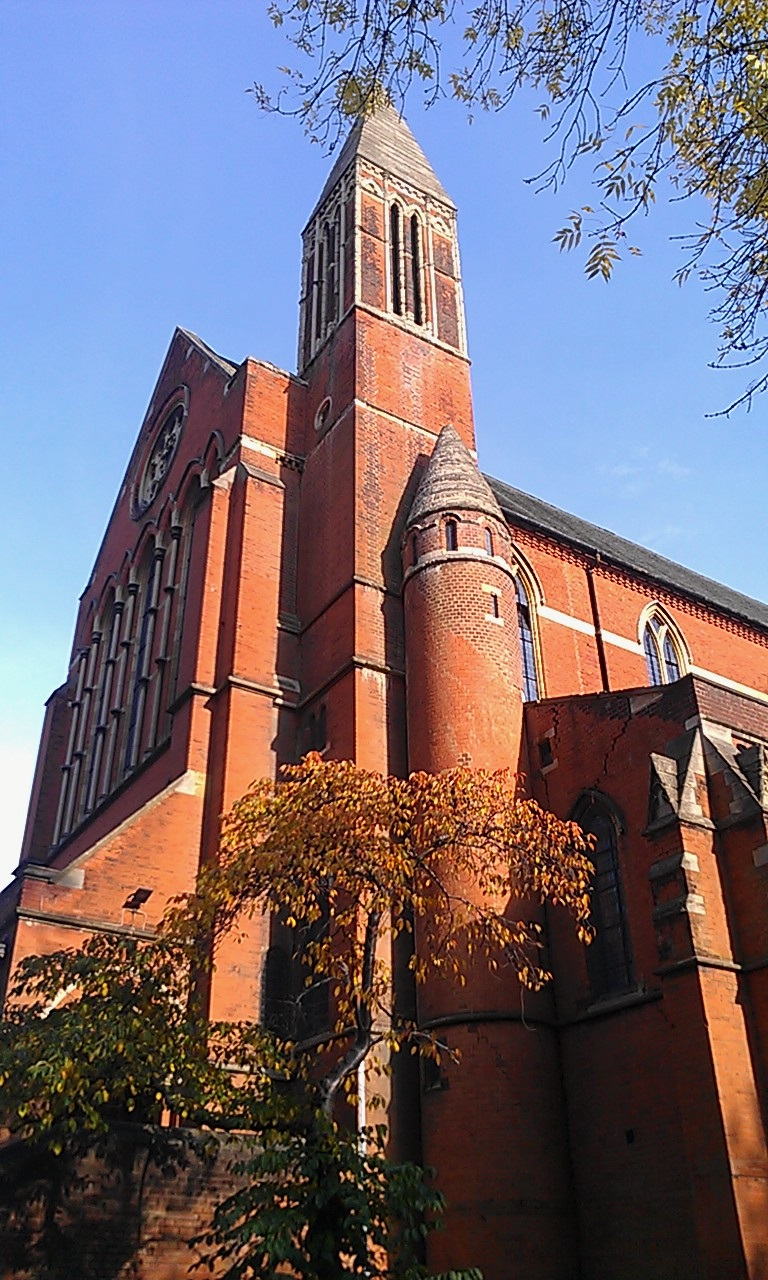
Exterior

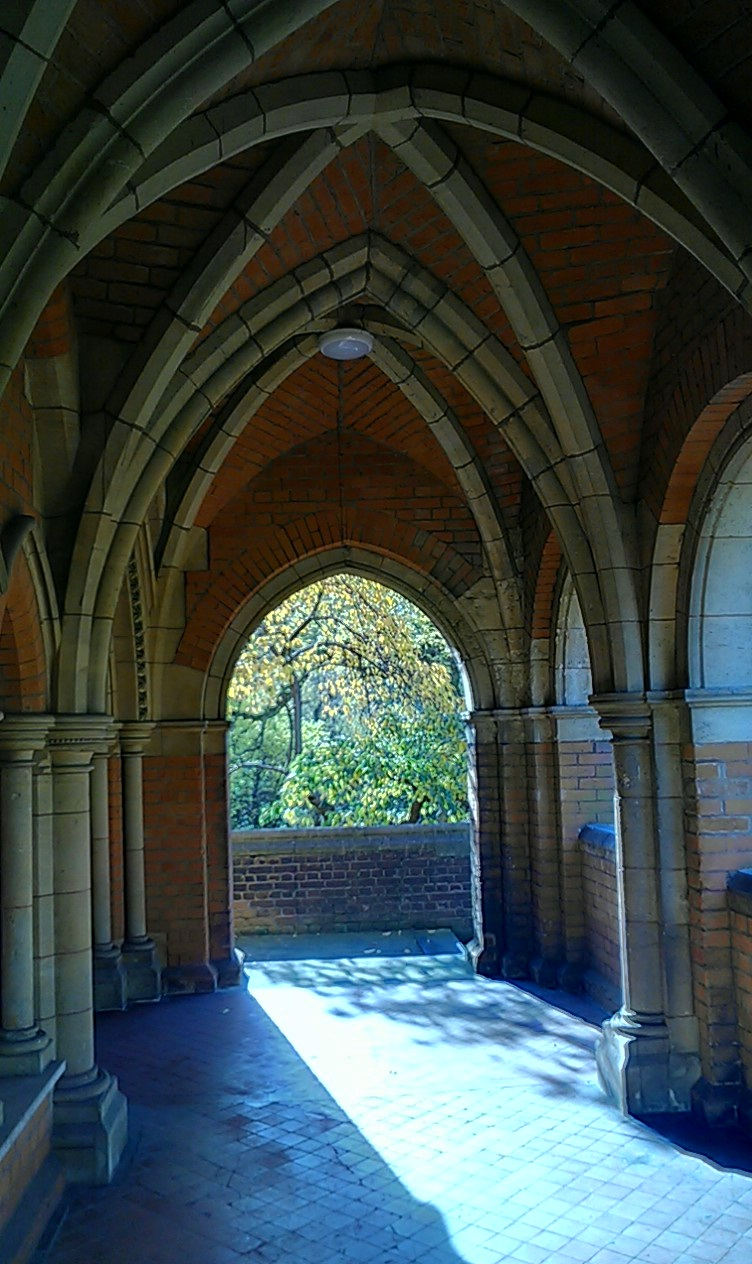
Cloisters

In the 1870s, the London conurbation was steadily expanding into the rural county of Surrey and new suburban houses were built in the area of modern Upper Norwood, with dwellings ranging from houses for the more affluent businessmen to modest workers' housing being built over the former ancient Surrey woodland. A large, temporary iron church was built to provide a place of worship for the new area, which in October 1875 was moved to the site of the present church in Auckland Road. The Priests-in-charge were Rev Philip Kingswood and Rev Thomas Helmore.

Early in 1876 it became a parish church and the first vicar was Rev William Fairbairn La Trobe-Bateman, who began an initiative to clear the church's debts and raise funds to build a permanent church to replace the iron structure. The fundraising was supplemented by a memorial fund set up in memory of the vicar's wife, who died unexpectedly in 1878 from tuberculosis.

The parish engaged the services of John Loughborough Pearson, an eminent ecclesiastical architect who had already designed a number of churches in the Gothic Revival style which was at the height of fashion in Victorian Britain, including his most recent project in North London, the large-scale St Augustine's, Kilburn which he had completed in 1877. Pearson was to draw up plans for a building to seat 1000 people at Upper Norwood. The Foundation stone was laid on 6 May 1878 in a field, but building work could not commence until enough funds had been raised. The Church Commissioners contributed an additional £1000 on the condition that the building plans included a tower. In 1881, after a total of £7,156, 17 shillings and six-and-a-half pence had been raised, construction began; after six years of construction the building was consecrated on 30 April 1887. Church Commissioners' conditions were never met due to financial difficulty and the church to this day does not have a spire.

== Architecture ==
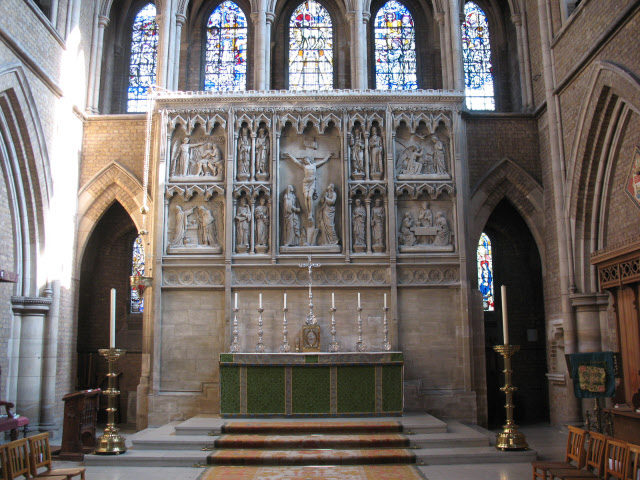
The High altar and stone reredos

Pearson's design is a plain red brick exterior with two turrets at the west end which Pevsner describes as "typically Pearsonian". The 160-foot (49 m)-long church is cruciform, and the south transept was originally designed to carry a 208-foot (63 m)-high tower, which has yet to be completed. Above the nave is a tall clerestory.

The interior of the building is stock brick with arcades and brick rib vaulting. Most striking is the large stone rood screen across the chancel, which features five gothic arches topped by four statues, and the large carved stone reredos.

The church was damaged by the bombing during the Second World War and restoration work was carried out by the conservation architects Caroe & Partners between 1946 and 1951. The stained glass designed by Clayton & Bell was lost during the bombing, but a large rose window has survived which is the work of Ninian Comper, a renowned late Gothic Revival designer who lived in Upper Norwood on Beulah Hill.

The building is suffering from the effects of subsidence which has required the reconstruction of the rood screen and has threatened the structure of the south aisle. Phase one works to secure the structure have now been completed with support from the Heritage Lottery Fund and other donors. Work is now underway to restore the interior features damaged by the subsidence.

== Music ==
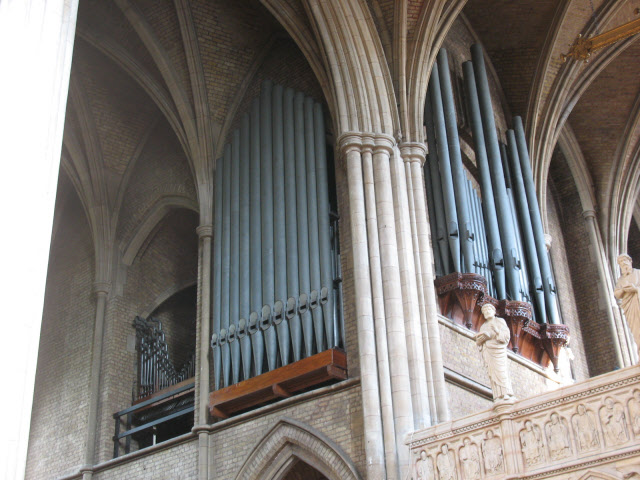
The 1882 Lewis Organ

Since the incumbency of Thomas Helmore, the Church of St John the Evangelist has maintained a strong tradition of music in Christian worship. The organ was originally built by Thomas Christopher Lewis in 1882 during the construction of the church, when only the chancel had been completed. The instrument was of an unusual design; while the organ itself was situated in the north transept, the console was placed on the other side of the church in the south choir aisle. This led to technical problems and the organ underwent several rebuilds in 1912, 1947 (following wartime bomb damage) and most recently in a restoration project undertaken in 1997-98 by Harrison & Harrison.

The church interior is noted for the quality of its acoustics and it is frequently used by classical music artists for CD recordings, including His Majesty's Sagbutts & Cornetts, Florilegium and I Fagiolini.

Also the church was the location of two music videos of Libera.

== Location ==
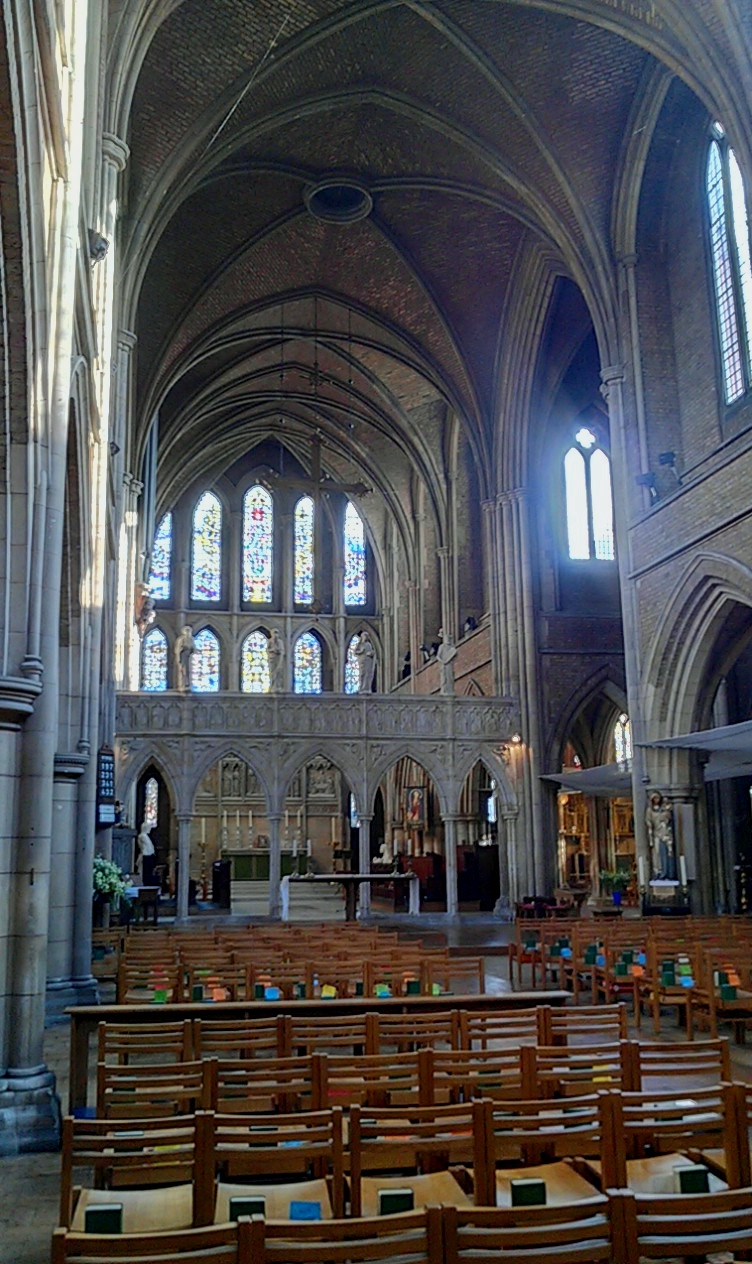
Interior

The church is situated on the corner of Auckland Road and Sylvan Road, approximately 0.6 miles (0.97 km) to the south of Crystal Palace Park and 0.2 miles (0.32 km) north-east of the Croydon transmitter. The nearest railway stations are Crystal Palace and Anerley.

== Notable clergy ==
Among the previous incumbent priests have been:

- Thomas Helmore (1873-1874), a noted authority on plainsong and English choral music
- Cecil Horsley, vicar from 1934 until 1938, later Bishop of Colombo in the Church of Ceylon and Bishop of Gibraltar
- Bev Mason, vicar from 2005 to 2012, later Bishop of Warrington

Other notable clergy include:

- John Taylor Smith, Bishop of Sierra Leone 1897–1901, had been curate at Upper Norwood 1885–1890
- Kenneth Mackenzie, who was Bishop of Brechin in the Scottish Episcopal Church from 1935 to 1943, served his curacy at St John the Evangelist 1903-05

== See also ==
- Grade I and II* listed buildings in the London Borough of Croydon
- List of new ecclesiastical buildings by J. L. Pearson
- Oxford Movement
- Ecclesiological Society
