= Tony Davies (priest) =

Vincent Anthony Davies (born 15 September 1946) is an Anglican priest. He was the Archdeacon of Croydon from 1994 to 2011.

Davies was educated at St. Michael's College, Llandaff and ordained in 1973. His first posts were curacies at St James, Owton Manor and St Faith, Wandsworth, after which he was its Parish Priest until 1981. He was in charge of St John Walworth from then until 1994 and was Rural Dean of Southwark and Newington from 1988 to 1993.

Church of England titles
Preceded by Frederick Hazell	Archdeacon of Croydon; 1994–2011	Succeeded by Chris Skilton
