= Addington Palace =

Mansion in Addington in Greater London, England

Coordinates: 51°21′27″N 0°02′27″W

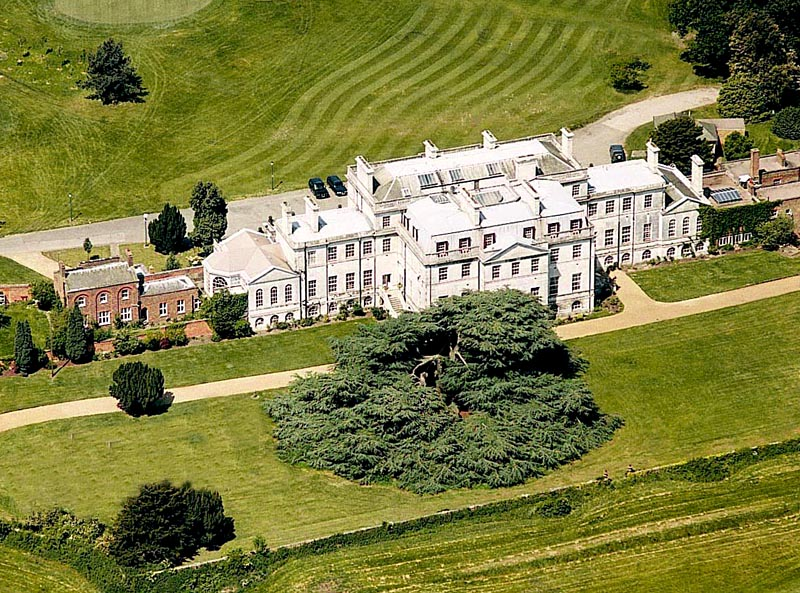
Addington Palace

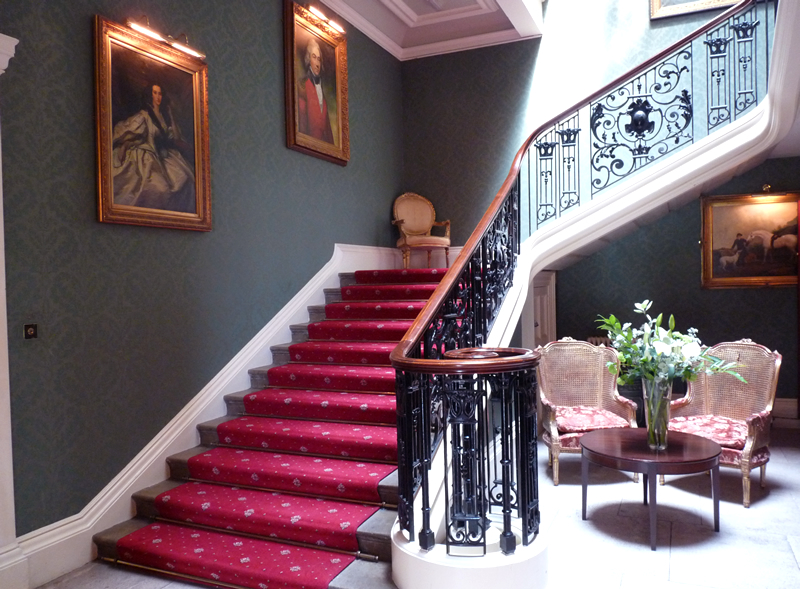
The Grand Staircase

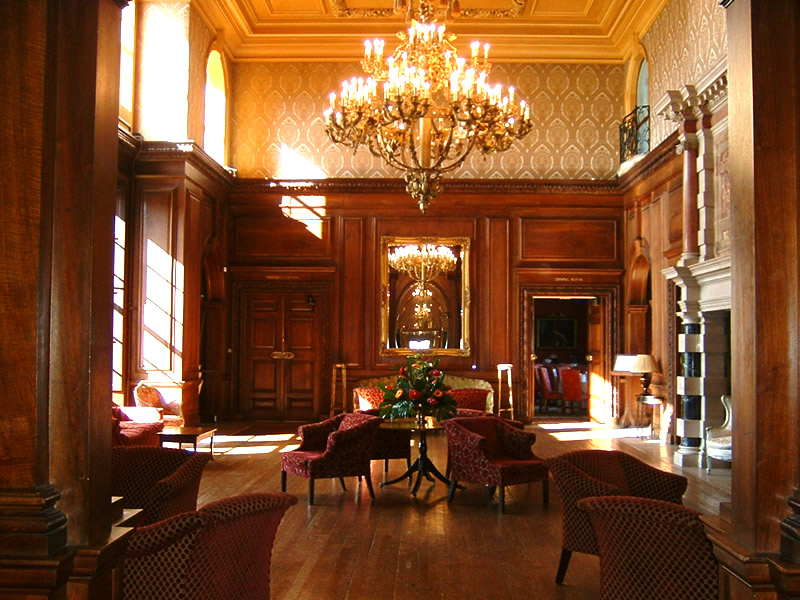
The Great Hall

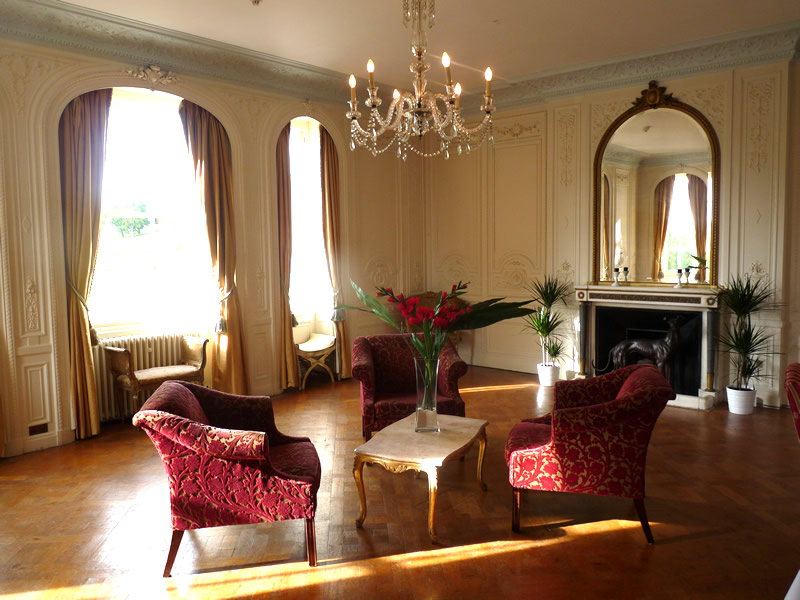
The Empire Room

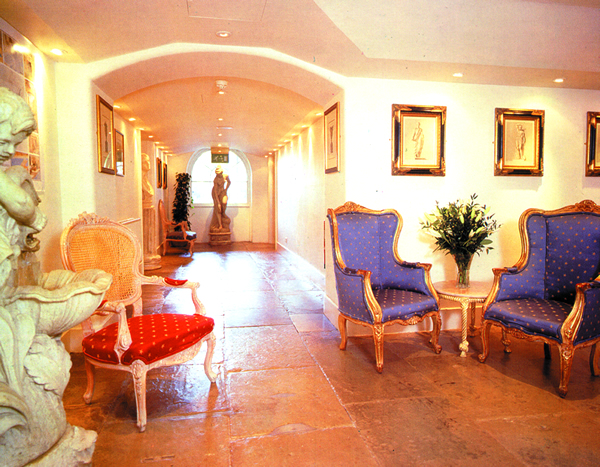
Health club lobby

Addington Palace is an 18th-century mansion in Addington located within the London Borough of Croydon. It was built close to the site of an earlier manor house belonging to the Leigh family. It is particularly known for having been, between 1807 and 1897, the summer residence of the Archbishops of Canterbury. Since the 1930s most of the grounds have been occupied by Addington Palace Golf Club. Between 1953 and 1996 the mansion was occupied by the Royal School of Church Music, which has since moved to Salisbury. It was later used as a wedding and events venue.

== History ==
The original manor house called Addington Place was built about the 16th century.

An ancient recipe for Malepigernout (or dillegrout), a spiced chicken porridge, was historically made by the current Lord of the Manor of Addington to be served upon the coronation of the monarch of England in a kitchen serjeanty. The Leigh family gained this serjeanty upon becoming Lords of the Manor of Addington sometime before 1504. The Addington estate was owned by the Leigh family until the early 18th century.

The last owner Sir John Leigh died without heirs in 1737 and his estates went to distant relatives, who eventually sold to Barlow Trecothick. Trecothick had been brought up in Boston, Massachusetts, and became a merchant there. He then moved to London, still trading as a merchant, and later sat as Member of Parliament (MP) for the City of London in 1768–74, and served as Lord Mayor in 1770. He bought the estate for £38,500 (equivalent to £6,070,000 in 2025).

He built a new house, designed by Robert Mylne in the Palladian style; a country mansion with single-storey wings. He died before it was completed in 1774 and it was inherited by his heir, James Ivers of Boston MA, who had to take the surname Trecothick in order to inherit the estate. James continued the work on the house, having the substantial grounds and gardens landscaped by Lancelot "Capability" Brown. Owing to financial difficulties, James Trecothick had to sell the estate in 1802. The estate was sold in lots in 1803. The next owners (William Coles and Westgarth Snaith) also got into financial trouble and sold it by act of Parliament in 1807. This enabled the mansion to be purchased for the Archbishops of Canterbury, since nearby Croydon Palace had become dilapidated and inconvenient. The name became Addington Farm whilst owned by the archbishops, much later it became known as Addington Palace. The archbishops made further changes and enlarged the building; work on the building was overseen by Richard Norman Shaw.

It became the official summer residence of six archbishops:

- Charles Manners-Sutton (Archbishop 1805–1828)
- William Howley (Archbishop 1828–1848)
- John Bird Sumner (Archbishop 1848–1862)
- Charles Thomas Longley (Archbishop 1862–1868)
- Archibald Campbell Tait (Archbishop 1868–1882)
- Edward White Benson (Archbishop 1883–1896)

All except Benson are buried in St Mary's Church or churchyard, Addington: Benson is buried in Canterbury Cathedral.

The house was sold in 1897 to Frederick Alexander English, a diamond merchant from South Africa. After his death, the mansion was taken over during the First World War by the Red Cross and became a fever hospital. Eventually, in 1930, it came into the hands of the County Borough of Croydon.

== Current usage ==
The house was Grade II* listed in 1951. In 1953, it was leased to the Royal School of Church Music, initially to house choirboys assembled from all over Britain to sing at the coronation of Queen Elizabeth II. The building housed the Royal School of Church Music's music publishing operation, residential college and choir school until 1996, when a private company took it over for development as a conference and banqueting venue, health farm and country club. It was used extensively for weddings until the company operating it went into liquidation in 2021.

It is surrounded by a park and golf courses, and its gardens are still largely in their original design. Much of the grounds have been leased by golf clubs and the exclusive Bishops Walk housing development was built on Bishops Walk (a private road).

A large cedar of Lebanon stands next to the palace, one of the Great Trees of London.

== See also ==
- Croydon Palace, the summer residence of the Archbishop of Canterbury for 500 years
