= Frederick Hazell =

Anglican priest (1930–2019)

Frederick Roy Hazell (12 August 1930 – 16 July 2019) was an Anglican priest who was the Archdeacon of Croydon from 1978 to 1993.

Hazell was educated at Hutton Grammar School and Fitzwilliam College, Cambridge. Brought up in the Exclusive Brethren, he was disowned by his family when he became an Anglican. He trained for ordination at Cuddesdon and was ordained deacon in 1956 and priest in 1957. His served his title at St Mary's Church, Ilkeston (1956–59) and St Lawrence, Heanor (1959–62) after which he was Vicar of All Saints', Marlpool (1962–63). He was Chaplain of the University of the West Indies from 1963 to 1966 then an Assistant Priest at St Martin-in-the-Fields. From 1968 to 1984 he was Vicar of Holy Saviour, Croydon, and its Rural Dean from 1972 to 1978. He was then collated Archdeacon of Croydon in 1978.

After he retired in 1993, he was Priest-in-charge of Chard Furnham with Chaffcombe, Knowle St Giles and Cricket Malherbie from 1995 to 1999; and of St Bartholomew, Tardebigge from 2000 to 2004.

Church of England titles
Preceded by John Taylor Hughes	Archdeacon of Croydon; 1978–1993	Succeeded by Vincent Anthony Davies
