= Charles Tonks =

Anglican priest

Charles Frederick Tonks MBE (28 September 1881 – 27 March 1957) was an Anglican priest. He was the Archdeacon of Croydon from 1948 to 1957.

Tonks was educated at King's College London and ordained in 1909. After a curacy at St Luke's Hackney he was the Secretary of the Church of England Temperance Society. He was Rector of St George's with St Mary Magdalene's Canterbury then Rural Dean of Canterbury. He was then Vicar of Walmer from 1928 to 1947 and an officiating chaplain to the British Armed Forces during World War II.

Church of England titles
| Preceded by Maurice Henry Harland | Archdeacon of Croydon; 1948–1957 | Succeeded by Jesse Alec Maynard Clayson |
