= John Bird Sumner =

Archbishop of Canterbury from 1848 to 1862

The Most Reverend and Right Honourable John Bird Sumner
- Archbishop of Canterbury
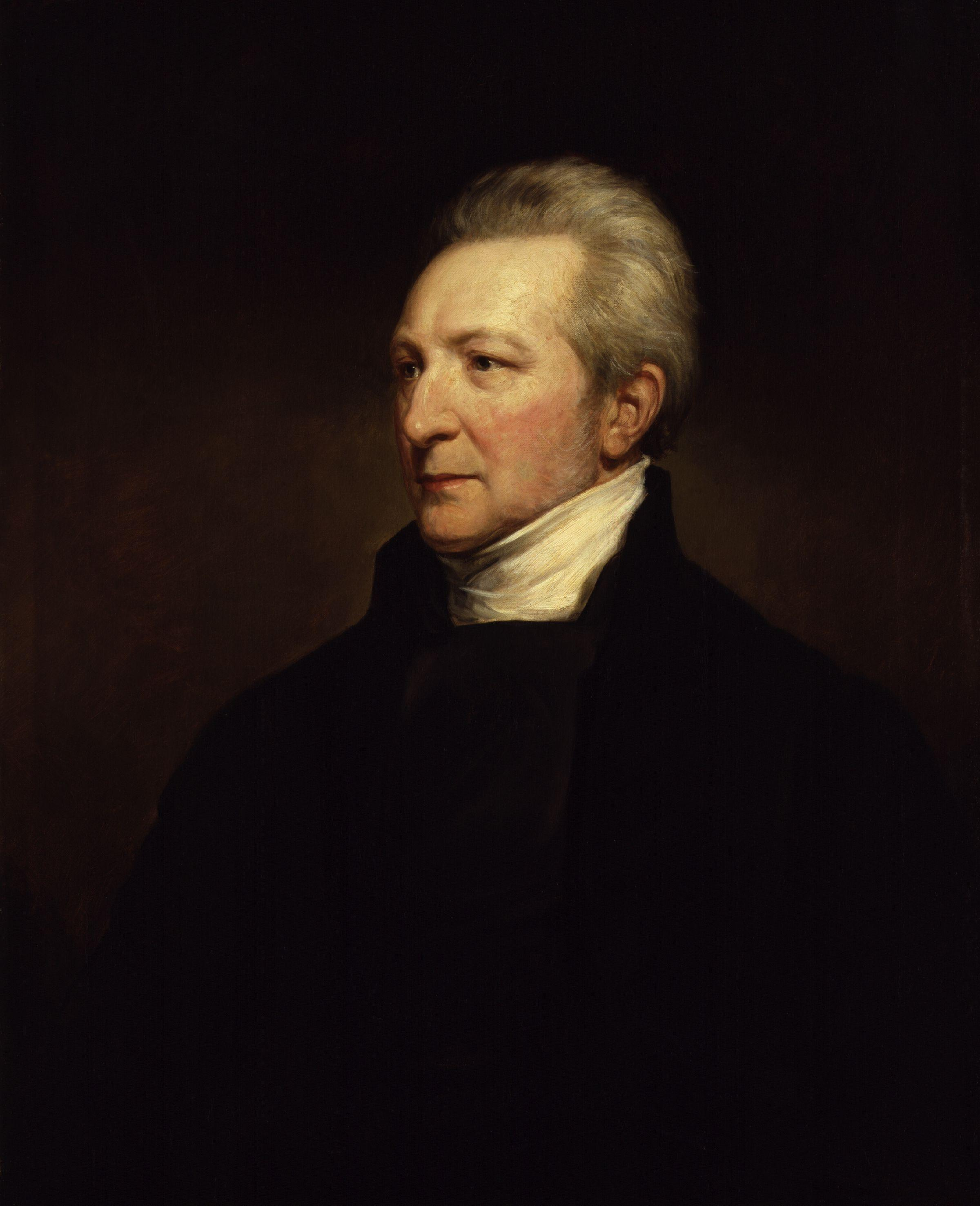
- Portrait by Margaret Sarah Carpenter
- Church: Church of England
- Diocese: Canterbury
- In office: 1848–1862
- Predecessor: William Howley
- Successor: Charles Longley
- Other post: Bishop of Chester (1828–1848)

Orders
- Ordination: 1803
- Consecration: 1828

Personal details
- Born: 25 February 1780 Kenilworth, Warwickshire, England
- Died: 6 September 1862 (aged 82) Addington, Surrey, England
- Buried: St Mary's Church, Addington
- Spouse: Marianne Robertson
- Children: at least 9
- Education: Eton College
- Alma mater: King's College, Cambridge

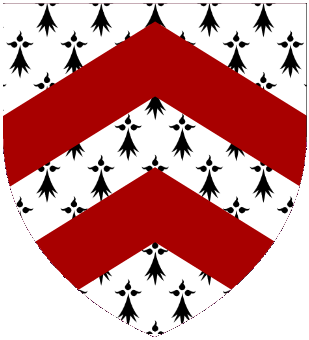
Arms: Ermine two chevrons Gules.

John Bird Sumner (25 February 1780 – 6 September 1862) was a bishop in the Church of England and Archbishop of Canterbury.

== Early life ==
John Bird Sumner was born in Kenilworth, Warwickshire, on 25 February 1780. He was the eldest son of the Rev. Robert Sumner, Vicar of Kenilworth, and his wife Hannah Bird, a first cousin of William Wilberforce. His brother Charles Richard Sumner was Bishop of Winchester.

Sumner was educated at Eton College and King's College, Cambridge.

== Career ==
In 1802, Sumner became an assistant master at his alma mater, Eton College, where he was nicknamed "Crumpety Sumner" by the boys. He was ordained in 1803. He was elected a Fellow of Eton in 1817 and in 1818 the school presented him to the living of Mapledurham, Oxfordshire.

In 1819, he was chosen as a prebendary of the Durham diocese where he served until 1828, when he was consecrated to the episcopate as the Bishop of Chester. He was consecrated on 14 September 1828, by Edward Venables-Vernon-Harcourt, Archbishop of York, at York Minster. During his episcopacy many churches and schools were built in the diocese.

=== Archbishop of Canterbury ===
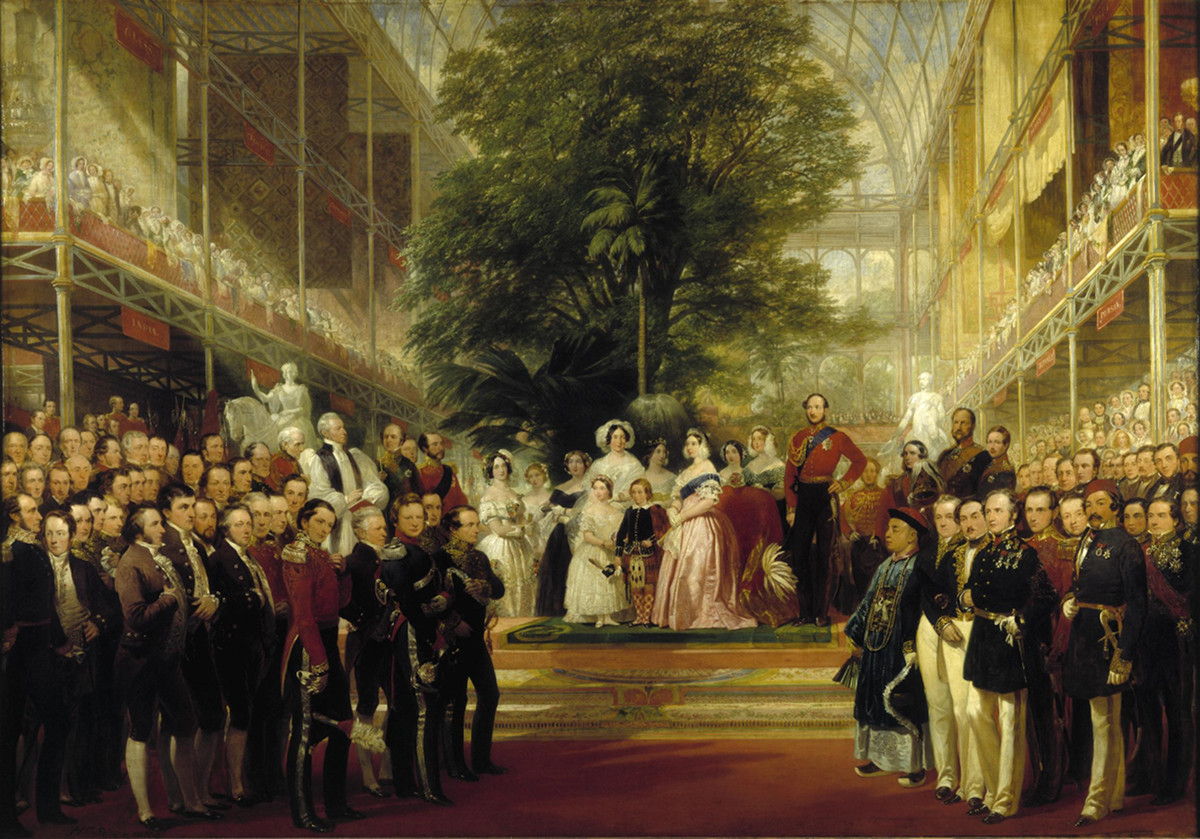
The Opening of the Great Exhibition by Queen Victoria by Henry Courtney Selous, 1852. Sumner is on the left hand side of the painting

In 1848 he was elevated to Archbishop of Canterbury (under which title he signed documents as "J B Cantuar") with an annual income of £15,000 (equivalent to £1.54 million in 2025).

Shortly after taking his seat in the House of Lords he voted for Catholic emancipation, which brought him into conflict with many of the clergy in his diocese.

In 1851, Sumner led the religious service at the formal opening of the Great Exhibition in "The Crystal Palace" in Hyde Park.

Sumner's numerous writings were much esteemed, especially by the evangelical party to which he belonged. His best known writings are his Treatise on the Records of Creation and the Moral Attributes of the Creator (London, 1816) and The Evidence of Christianity derived from its Nature and Reception (London, 1821).

In the Gorham Case, Sumner came into conflict with Henry Phillpotts, Bishop of Exeter (1778–1869), who accused him of supporting heresy and refused to communicate with him. He supported the Divorce Bill in parliament but opposed the Deceased Wife's Sister Bill and the bill for removing Jewish disabilities. His obituary in the Norfolk News of 13 September 1862 commented that "he strongly opposed the admission of Jews into parliament ... and was among the foremost to denounce the Puseyite school of theology".

Sumner was president of the Canterbury Association, which founded Christchurch, New Zealand. In 1848 he was elected a Fellow of the Royal Society. Archbishop Sumner Church of England Primary School in Lambeth is named in his memory.

== Personal life ==
On 31 March 1803, Sumner married Marianne Robertson (1779-1829) in the parochial chapel of St Mary Walcot, Bath, Somerset. She was the daughter of George Robertson of Edinburgh (1742-1791), a captain in the Royal Navy, and Ann (née Lewis) Robertson (1748-1802). His wife's maternal grandparents were Francis Lewis, a New York signatory of the Declaration of Independence, and Elizabeth (née Anessley) Lewis. Sumner and wife had at least nine children:

- Anne Sumner (1805–1833), who married John Adair Griffith Colpoys, son of Vice Admiral Edward Griffith Colpoys.
- Louisa Elizabeth Sumner (1806-)
- Eliza Maria Sumner (1808–1836), mother of the cricketer John Sumner Gibson.
- Caroline Sumner (1811–1811), who died in infancy.
- Georgina Sumner (1814–1881), who married Wilson Dobie Wilson.
- Caroline Sumner (1816–1841), a twin.
- Maria Sumner (1816–1861), a twin.
- The Rev. John Henry Robertson Sumner (1821–1910), father of the footballer John Robert Edwards Sumner.
- Robert George Moncrieff Sumner (1824–1885).

Marianne Sumner died at the Manor House, Wandsworth, on 22 March 1829. Sumner died on 6 September 1862 at Addington Palace, aged 82, and was buried on 12 September in the graveyard of St Mary's Church, Addington. Two daughters and other relatives are interred at the north-east corner of the churchyard.

Sumner's great grand-nephew was Australian actor Peter Sumner, who appeared in Star Wars.

== Portraits ==
A painting of Sumner hangs in the hall of University College, Durham; another, in his convocation robes, by Eddis, is at Lambeth Palace; a replica of this is in the hall at King's College, Cambridge. A portrait by Margaret Carpenter was engraved by Samuel Cousins in 1839. A later portrait by the same artist was engraved by T. Richardson Jackson. Francis Holl executed an engraving of another portrait of him by George Richmond. A public subscription was raised after his death for a recumbent effigy in the nave of Canterbury Cathedral, created by Canterbury-born Henry Weekes.

Church of England titles
| Preceded by Charles James Blomfield | Bishop of Chester; 1828–1848 | Succeeded by John Graham |
| Preceded by William Howley | Archbishop of Canterbury; 1848–1862 | Succeeded by Charles Longley |
