= Simon Gates =

British archdeacon (born 1960)

Simon Philip Gates (born Bromley, 12 July 1960) has been Archdeacon of Lambeth since 2013.

Gates was educated at the University of St Andrews then Durham University. He was ordained in 1988. After curacies in Southall and Hong Kong he became Vicar of Clapham Park in 1996. In 2006 he moved to minister at Telford Park, a post he left in 2013 when he was appointed an Archdeacon.

Church of England titles
Preceded by Chris Skilton	Archdeacon of Lambeth; 2013–present	Incumbent
