= Charles Longley =

Archbishop of Canterbury from 1862 to 1868

The Most Reverend and Right Honourable Charles Longley
- Archbishop of Canterbury
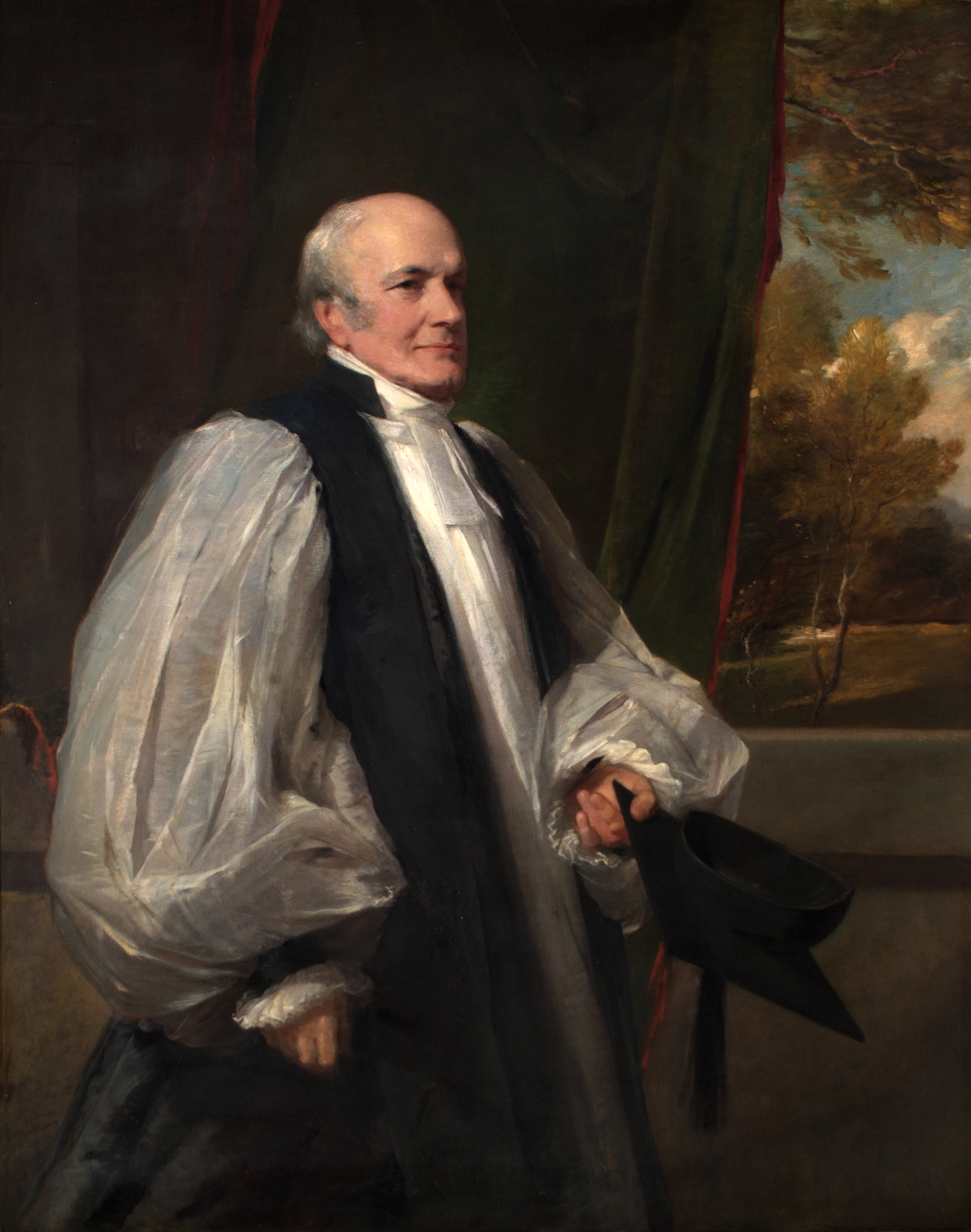
- Portrait by George Richmond
- Church: Church of England
- Province: Canterbury
- Diocese: Canterbury
- In office: 1862 – 27 October 1868
- Predecessor: John Bird Sumner
- Successor: Archibald Campbell Tait

Personal details
- Born: 28 July 1794 Rochester, Kent, England
- Died: 27 October 1868 (aged 74) Addington, Surrey, England
- Buried: St Mary the Blessed Virgin Church, Addington, London
- Denomination: Anglican
- Spouse: Hon. Caroline Sophia Parnell
- Children: 7
- Education: Christ Church, Oxford
- Signature: Charles Longley's signature

Charles Thomas Longley (28 July 1794 – 27 October 1868) was a bishop in the Church of England. He served as Headmaster of Harrow School, as inaugural Bishop of Ripon, as Bishop of Durham, as Archbishop of York, and then as Archbishop of Canterbury for six years from 20 October 1862 until his death.

== Life ==
He was born at Rochester, Kent, the fifth son of the late John Longley, Recorder of Rochester, and educated at Westminster School and Christ Church, Oxford, where he matriculated in 1812, graduating B.A. 1815 (M.A. 1818), B.D. and D.D. 1829.

At Christ Church, Longley was reader in Greek 1822, tutor and censor 1825–8, and proctor 1827. He was ordained in 1818, and was appointed vicar of Cowley, Oxford, in 1823. In 1827, he received the rectory of West Tytherley, Hampshire, and two years later he was elected headmaster of Harrow School. He held this office until 1836, when he was consecrated bishop of the new see of Ripon. In 1856 he became Bishop of Durham, and in 1860 he became Archbishop of York.

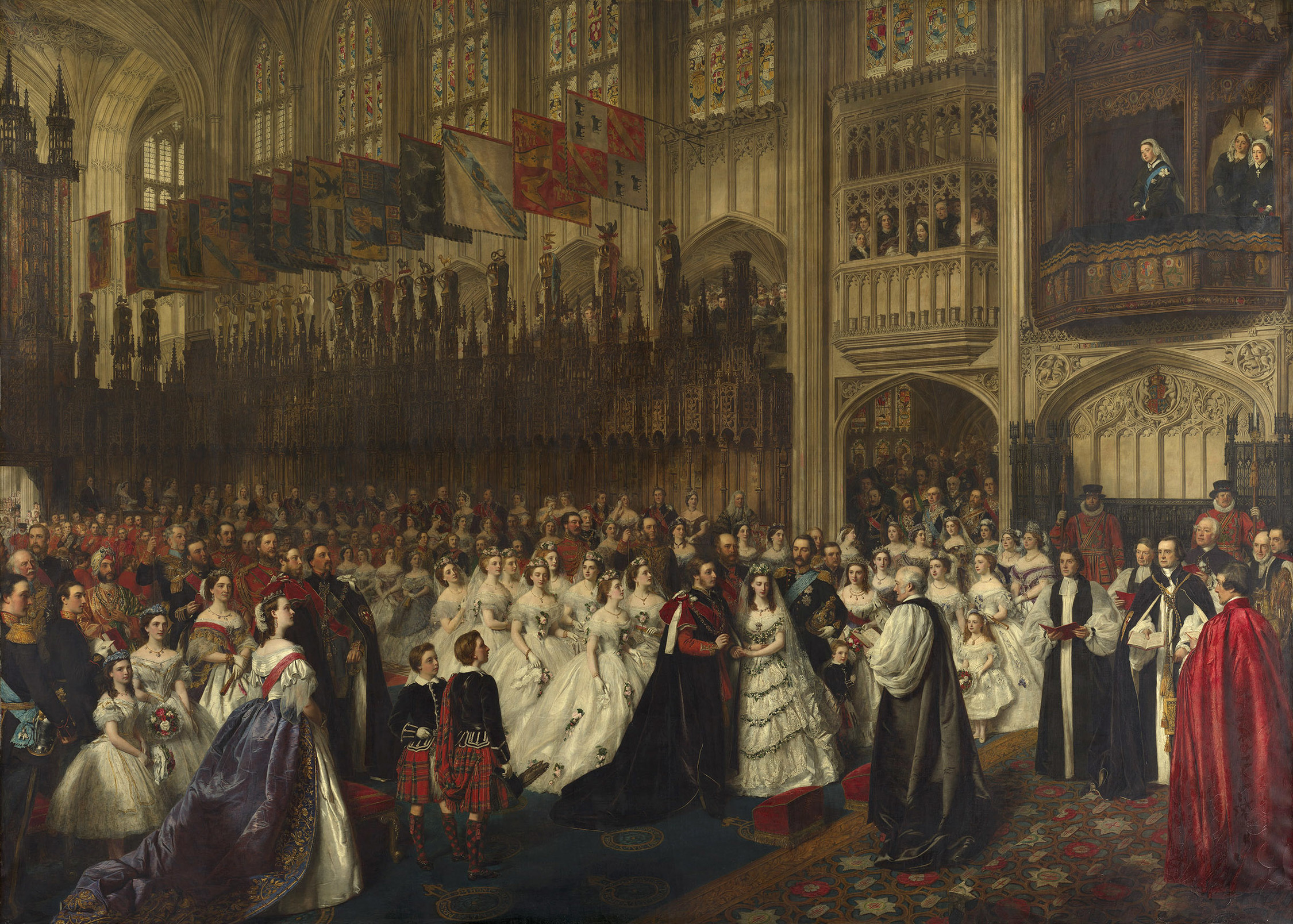
Wedding of Prince Albert Edward and Princess Alexandra, by William Powell Frith. Longley married the couple on 10 March 1863 at St George's Chapel, Windsor Castle.

In 1862, he succeeded John Bird Sumner as Archbishop of Canterbury. Soon afterwards the questions connected with the deposition of John William Colenso were referred to Longley but, while regarding Colenso's opinions as heretical and his deposition as justifiable, he refused to pronounce upon the legal difficulties of the case.

The chief event of his primacy was the meeting at Lambeth, in 1867, of the first Pan-Anglican conference of British, colonial and foreign bishops. His published works included numerous sermons and addresses. He died at Addington Park, near Croydon.

Like Sumner, he was a member of the Canterbury Association from 27 March 1848.

== Family ==
A photograph of Charles Thomas Longley by Charles Dodgson (Lewis Carroll).

As Headmaster of Harrow School, he married the Hon. Caroline Sophia Parnell on 15 December 1831. Her brother the Hon. George Damer Parnell was the curate of Ash, 1859–1861. Parnell was the daughter of Henry Parnell, 1st Baron Congleton. They had seven children, three sons and four daughters, namely:

1. Henry Longley (28 November 1833 – 25 December 1899), served as Chief Charity Commissioner for England and Wales. He married Diana Eliza Davenport (fl. 1905), daughter of John Davenport of Foxley, Herefordshire, on 17 September 1861.

2. George Longley, born 8 March 1835 at Harrow, Middlesex.

3. Mary Henrietta Longley (born 2 May 1837 in Ramsgate, Kent) married – on 9 December 1858 – George Winfield Bourke (died 9 October 1903), Honorary Chaplain to the Monarch, and son of Robert Bourke, 5th Earl of Mayo. Their only child was Walter Longley Bourke, 8th Earl of Mayo (28 November 1859 – 1939); from 1891 to 1903, he was a Trustee of the Bridgewater Estates. Walter had married in 1887, and had four sons and two daughters, by 1905. Walter's second son was Ulick Henry Bourke, 9th Earl of Mayo (1890–1962), and third son Bryan Longley Bourke (1897–1961) was father of Terence Bourke, 10th Earl of Mayo (1929–2006), himself father of the present Earl.

4. Frances Elizabeth Longley (born 3 July 1839)

5. Arthur Longley (born 1841 in Ripon, Yorkshire)

6. Caroline Georgina Longley (died 30 October 1867) married, on 6 November 1862, (as his 1st wife) Edward Levett (18 December 1832 – 28 December 1899), major in the 10th Royal Hussars, of Wychnor Park and Packington Hall, Staffordshire, third son of John Levett and his wife Sophia Kennedy, granddaughter of Archibald Kennedy, 11th Earl of Cassilis. They had two daughters, both of whom married and had children.

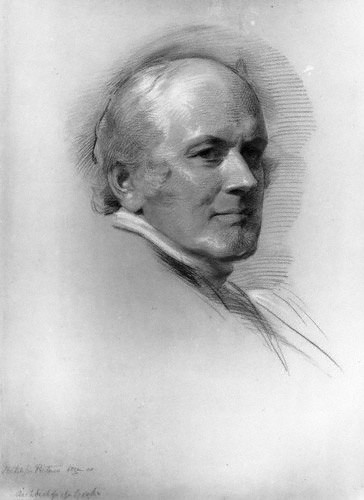
Charles Thomas Longley, by George Richmond, c. 1862

7. Rosamond Esther Harriett Longley (died 1936) married, 1870, Cecil Thomas Parker (1845–1931), 2nd son of Thomas Parker, 6th Earl of Macclesfield by his 2nd wife Mary Frances Grosvenor, a sister of Hugh Grosvenor, 1st Duke of Westminster, and had four sons and two daughters. Their elder daughter Caroline Beatrix Parker (1873–1961) married, 1895, William Bridgeman, 1st Viscount Bridgeman, of Leigh, Shropshire in 1929, PC (1864–1935), only child of John Orlando Bridgeman, Rector of Weston-under-Lizard (himself 3rd and youngest son of George Bridgeman, 2nd Earl of Bradford) by his wife Marianne Caroline Clive, daughter of William Clive, and left children, including the present Viscount. The fourth and youngest son Wilfrid Parker (1883–1966) became Bishop of Pretoria, South Africa. A granddaughter (by the 3rd son Geoffrey) Isolda Rosamond Parker (1918–2014) married, 1940, David Pollock, 2nd Viscount Hanworth (1916–1996) and is mother of the present peer.

== Notes ==
Church of England titles
New diocese	Bishop of Ripon; 1836–1856	Succeeded by Robert Bickersteth
Preceded by Edward Maltby	Bishop of Durham; 1856–1860	Succeeded by Henry Montagu Villiers
Preceded by Thomas Musgrave	Archbishop of York; 1860–1862	Succeeded by William Thomson
Preceded by John Bird Sumner	Archbishop of Canterbury; 1862–1868	Succeeded by Archibald Campbell Tait
Academic offices
Preceded by George Butler	Head Master of Harrow School; 1829–1836	Succeeded by Christopher Wordsworth
