= Charles Manners-Sutton =

Archbishop of Canterbury from 1805 to 1828

The Most Reverend and Right Honourable Charles Manners-Sutton
- Archbishop of Canterbury
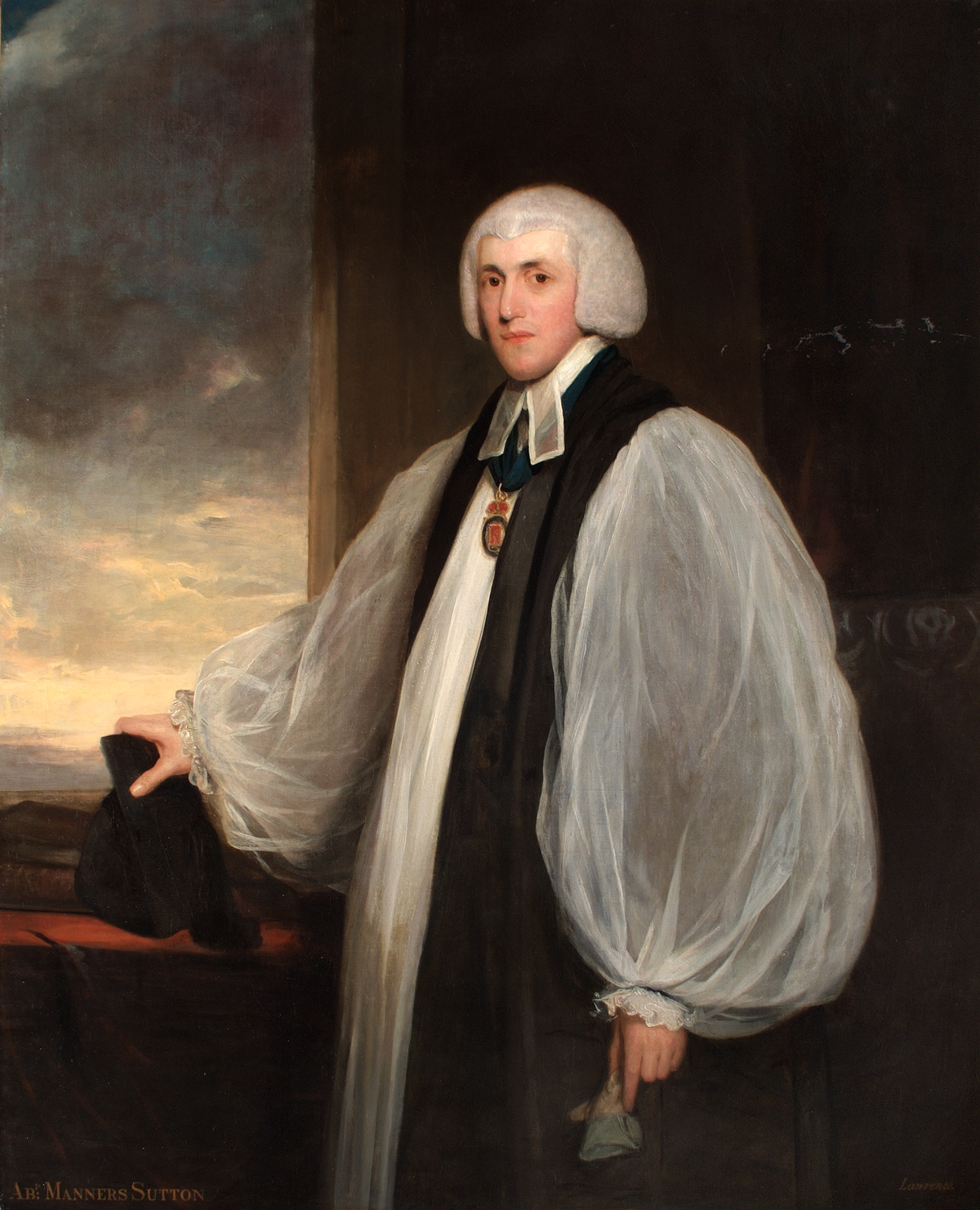
- Portrait by John Hoppner
- Church: Church of England
- Province: Canterbury
- Diocese: Canterbury
- Elected: 21 February 1805 (election confirmed), St Mary-le-Bow
- Installed: 1805
- Term ended: 21 July 1828 (death)
- Predecessor: John Moore
- Successor: William Howley
- Other posts: Dean of Peterborough; 1791–1792; Bishop of Norwich; 1792–1805; Dean of Windsor in commendam, 1794–1805

Personal details
- Born: Charles Manners; 17 February 1755
- Died: 21 July 1828 (aged 73) Lambeth, Surrey, England
- Buried: 29 July 1828, St Mary the Blessed Virgin Church, Addington, London
- Denomination: Anglican
- Parents: Lord George Manners-Sutton & Diana Chaplin
- Spouse: Mary Thoroton (m. 1778)
- Children: 2 sons, 10 daughters; incl. Charles, 1st Viscount Canterbury
- Education: Emmanuel College, Cambridge
- Signature: Charles Manners-Sutton's signature

Ordination history of Charles Manners-Sutton
History
Episcopal consecration
- Principal consecrator: John Moore (Canterbury)
- Co-consecrators: John Hinchliffe (Peterbro'), Jas. Cornwallis (Lich & C.), Richard Beadon (Glo'ster)
- Date: 8 April 1792

Charles Manners-Sutton (né Manners; 17 February 1755 – 21 July 1828) was a British clergyman in the Church of England who served as Archbishop of Canterbury from 1805 to 1828.

== Life ==
Manners-Sutton was the fourth son of Lord George Manners-Sutton (third son of John Manners, 3rd Duke of Rutland) and his wife Diana Chaplin, daughter of Thomas Chaplin. His younger brother was Thomas Manners-Sutton, 1st Baron Manners, Lord Chancellor of Ireland. His father, Lord George, had assumed the additional surname of Sutton in 1762 on inheriting – from his elder brother Lord Robert – the estates of their maternal grandfather Robert Sutton, 2nd Baron Lexinton. He was called Charles Manners before 1762.

Manners-Sutton was educated at Charterhouse School and Emmanuel College, Cambridge (matriculated 1773, graduated B.A. as 15th wrangler 1777, M.A. 1780, D.D. 1792).

He married at age 23, and probably eloped with, his cousin Mary Thoroton, daughter of Thomas Thoroton and his wife Mary (Levett) Thoroton of Screveton Hall, Nottinghamshire, in 1778. (Col. Thomas Blackborne Thoroton later moved to Flintham Hall, Flintham, near Screveton, Nottinghamshire. He was later known as Thomas Thoroton Hildyard. Both Thoroton and his stepbrother Levett Blackborne, Esq., a Lincoln's Inn barrister, had long acted as advisers to John Manners, 3rd Duke of Rutland, and Col. Thoroton was often resided at Belvoir Castle, the ancestral seat of the Dukes of Rutland.)

In 1785, Manners-Sutton was appointed to the family living at Averham with Kelham, in Nottinghamshire, and in 1791, became Dean of Peterborough. He was consecrated Bishop of Norwich in 1792, and two years later received the appointment of Dean of Windsor in commendam.

== Archbishop of Canterbury ==
He had long been the favourite candidate for Canterbury. On the death of Archbishop John Moore in January 1805, the Prime Minister, William Pitt the Younger, wished to appoint his former tutor George Pretyman Tomline to Canterbury. George III overruled Pitt, exercising the royal prerogative to appoint Manners-Sutton. During his primacy, the old archepiscopal palace at Croydon was sold and the country palace of Addington was bought with the proceeds. He presided over the first meeting which issued in the foundation of the National Society, and subsequently lent the scheme his strong support. He also exerted himself to promote the establishment of the Indian episcopate. As Archbishop of Canterbury, Manners-Sutton appointed his cousin, Evelyn Levett Sutton, a chaplain to Lord Manners, as one of six preachers of Canterbury Cathedral in 1811.

In 1819, he presided over the christening of the future Queen Victoria at Kensington Palace.

He died at Lambeth on 21 July 1828, and was buried on 29 July at Addington, in a family vault.

== Works ==
His only published works are two sermons, one preached before the Lords (London, 1794), the other before the Society for the Propagation of the Gospel (London, 1797).

== Family ==
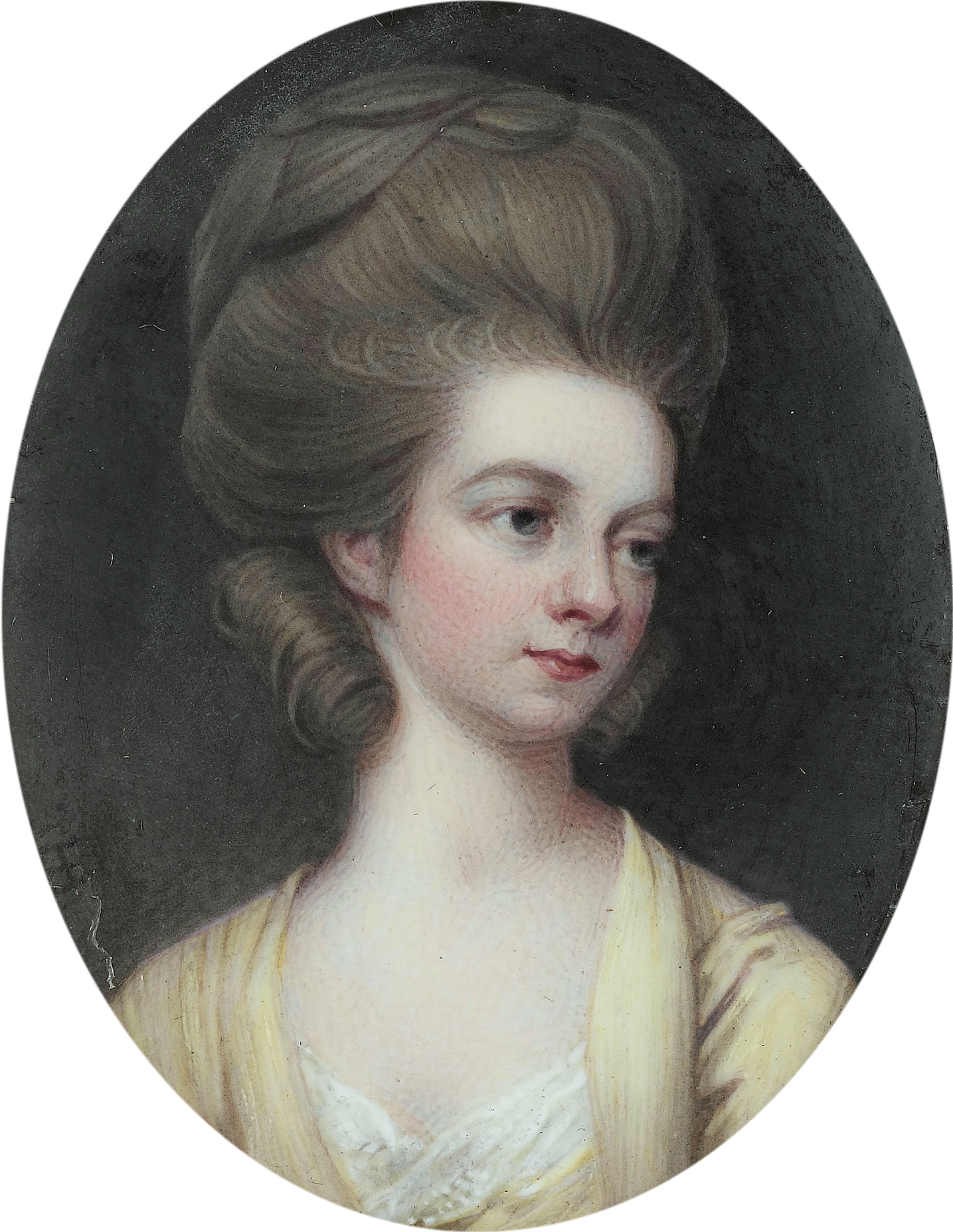
Mary Manners-Sutton née Thoroton (1783-1829) (Henry Bone, 1829)

In 1778 he married Mary, daughter of Thomas Thoroton of Screveton, Nottinghamshire, by whom he had a family of two sons and ten daughters. His son Charles Manners-Sutton served as Speaker of the House of Commons and was created Viscount Canterbury in 1835. His grandson Henry Manners Chichester by his daughter Isabella was a prolific contributor to the Dictionary of National Biography.

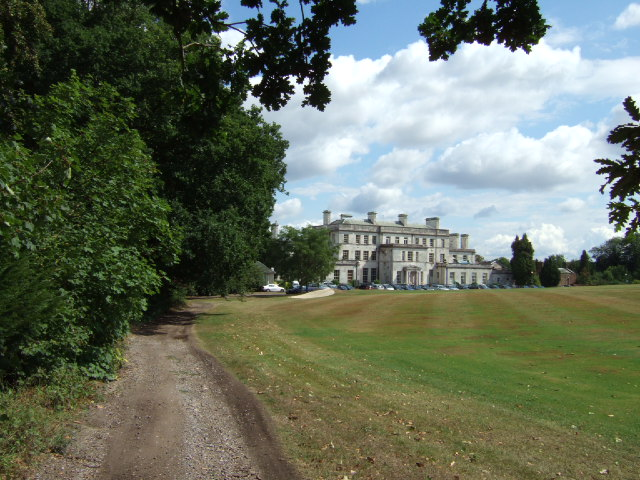
Addington Palace was the archbishop's home from 1805 until his death.

== Arms ==
Coat of arms of Charles Manners-Sutton

Notes
While serving as a bishop Manners-Sutton's arms would be displayed impaled with the arms of the diocese and topped by a mitre.
Escutcheon
Quarterly 1st & 4th Argent a canton Sable 2nd & 3rd Or two bars Azure a chief quarterly of the last charged with two fleurs-de-lys Or and Gules a lion of England.

Church of England titles
| Preceded by George Horne | Bishop of Norwich; 1792–1805 | Succeeded by Henry Bathurst |
| Preceded by John Moore | Archbishop of Canterbury; 1805–1828 | Succeeded by William Howley |
