= Addington, London =

Village in Greater London, England

Coordinates: 51.3583°N 0.0305°W

Addington
- Village
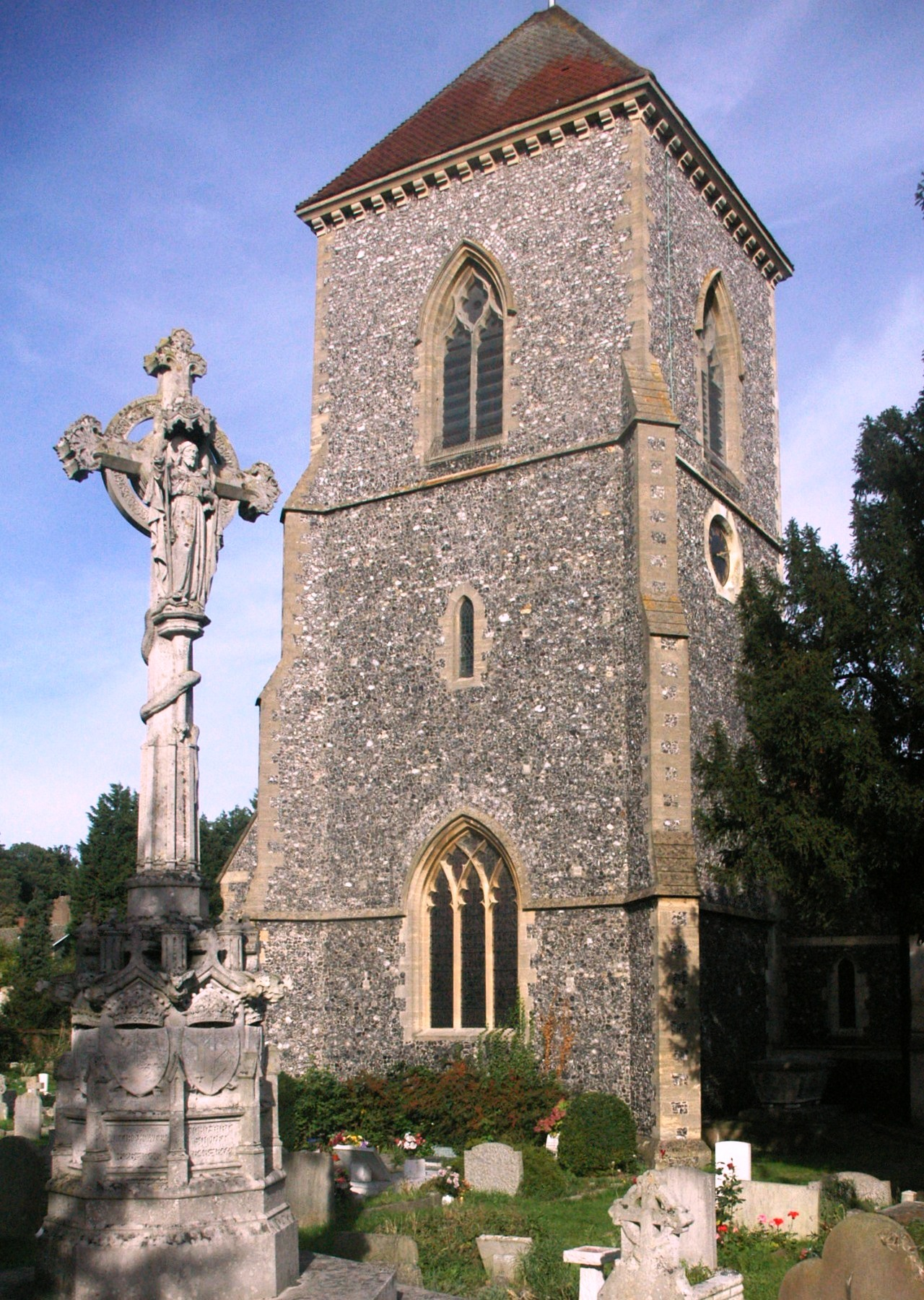
- St Mary's Church

- Location within Greater London
- OS grid reference: TQ375645
  - Charing Cross: 11.1 mi (17.9 km) NNW
- London borough: Croydon
- Ceremonial county: Greater London
- Region: London
- Country: England
- Sovereign state: United Kingdom
- Post town: CROYDON
- Postcode district: CR0
- Post town: SOUTH CROYDON
- Postcode district: CR2
- Dialling code: 01689
- Police: Metropolitan
- Fire: London
- Ambulance: London
- UK Parliament: Croydon East
- London Assembly: Croydon and Sutton

Addington is a village and area in south London, England, within the London Borough of Croydon. It is south of Spring Park, west of Coney Hall, north of New Addington and east of Forestdale and Selsdon, and is 11.1 miles (18 km) south of Charing Cross and 4 miles (6.4 km) south-east of the centre of Croydon.

== History ==
In Domesday Book of 1086, the area was named Edintona and then Eddintone. The village lay within the Wallington hundred in the county of Surrey. Addington is thought to be named after Edda, a Saxon landowner. In Domesday, two manors are mentioned, linked with the names Godric and Osward.

=== Addington Palace ===
Addington Place, later known as Addington Farm and now called Addington Palace, dominates the village above the church of St Mary the Blessed Virgin Church and The Cricketers pub. The manor house was situated behind the church and was the residence of the Leigh family. There is an oft repeated, but false account of a royal hunting lodge, "where King Henry VIII supposedly wooed Anne Boleyn, whose family owned nearby Wickham Court" by West Wickham Parish Church. However, the Anne Boleyn of Wickham Court was the aunt of Queen Anne.

The Palladian Palace was built in 1780 by Barlow Trecothick, from Boston, Massachusetts in the colonial Province of Massachusetts Bay, who returned to England and became an MP and Lord Mayor of the City of London in 1770. After his death without heirs, his nephew James Ivers (later Trecothick), also of Boston, continued his uncle's work and had the grounds laid out by Capability Brown. The estate was sold and eventually, as Croydon Palace became too inconvenient and unsanitary, the Addington house and part of the estate was bought for the Archbishops of Canterbury as a country residence. The last archbishop to use it was Edward Benson (Archbishop 1883–1896). From 1954 to 1996, Addington Palace was the headquarters of the Royal School of Church Music.

=== New Addington ===
Around 1805 parts of the estate covering what is now New Addington were sold to John Cator of Beckenham Place, including Castle Hill Farm. Cator left this to George and Henry Sparkes in his Will in 1806, citing "Addington recently acquired from ..... Trecothick" but the land appears as part of the Cator estates in a private act of Parliament, Cator's Estate Act 1825 (6 Geo. 4. c. 38 Pr.) allowing the Cators to sell the land, as John Barwell Cator was transferring the main estate holdings to Woodbastwick in Norfolk.

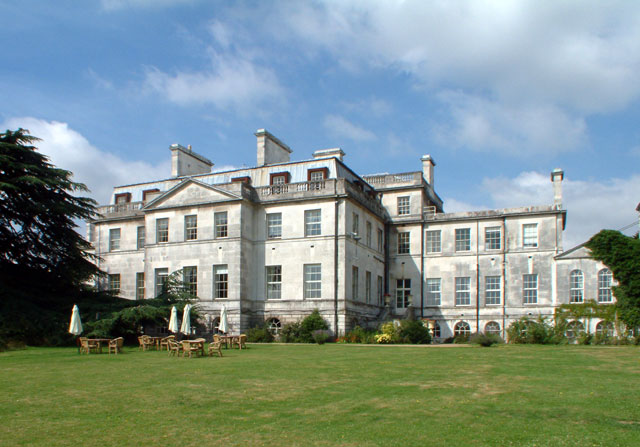
Addington Palace, listed at grade II*

In the 20th century, technological advances and population growth in the region led to many changes in the way of life for people in Addington. At the beginning of the century, Addington was in the county of Surrey, which had established urban and rural districts to provide services matched to the needs of the differing communities. The parish of Addington was transferred to Godstone Rural District on abolition of Croydon Rural District in 1915. Subsequently, Addington parish became part of the County Borough of Croydon in 1925. On 1 April 1928 the parish was abolished and merged with Croydon St John the Baptist. At the 1921 census (the last before the abolition of the parish), Addington had a population of 691. Since 1965 the county borough has been part of the London Borough of Croydon within highly urbanized Greater London.

New Addington was developed to the south of the existing village from the 1930s onwards.

There are still several old houses and buildings in Addington and, even though there has been some fairly modern building, the village atmosphere is intact in the 21st century, despite its being in Greater London. There is a blacksmith's forge, dating from around 1740, now mainly making ornamental ironwork. The hunt used to meet outside the pub, The Cricketers which has reverted to its former name once again after a temporary change of name. The village co-operative store and post office is now a private house.

== St Mary the Blessed Virgin Church ==
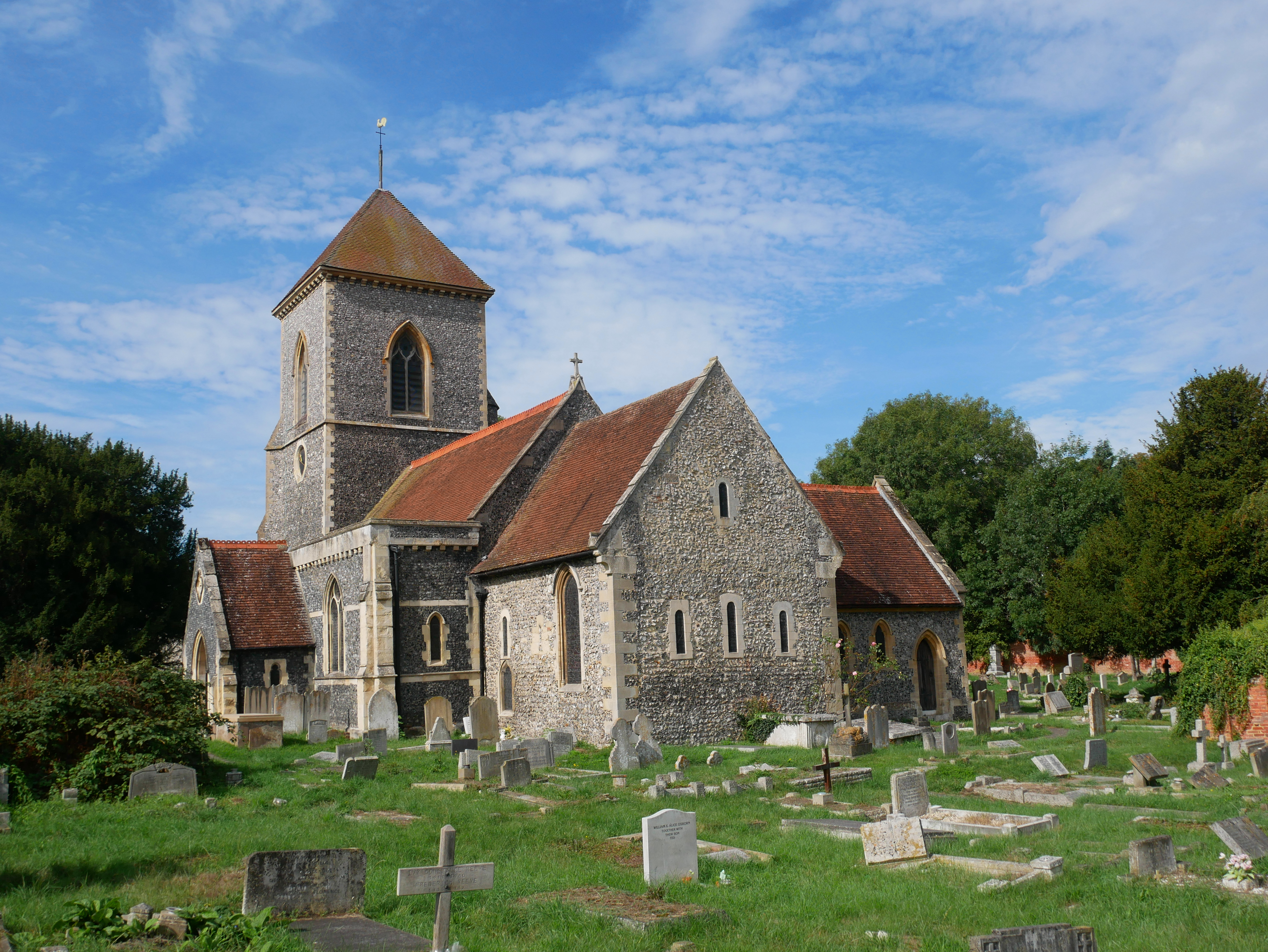
Southeast view of the Church of Saint Mary

St Mary's Church, Addington is an Anglican church in the village. It is associated with the Archbishops of Canterbury of the 19th century, who lived at nearby Addington Palace. Five successive archbishops are buried at the church: Charles Manners-Sutton (d.1828); William Howley (d.1848); John Bird Sumner (d.1862); Charles Longley (d.1868); and Archibald Campbell Tait (d.1882).

== Transport ==
=== Rail ===
Addington Village Interchange (also known as Addington Village tram stop) connects the area with Tramlink services to West Croydon and New Addington. Addington Palace is served by Gravel Hill tram stop on the same line.

=== Bus ===
The interchange also provides access to bus routes run by Transport for London, which connect it with areas including Bromley, Croydon, Eltham, Hayes, New Addington, Orpington, Purley and Thornton Heath.

== Sport ==
Cricket has been played in the village since at least the 18th century.

The Addington Golf Club is regarded as an important golf facility in the London area.

== Gallery ==
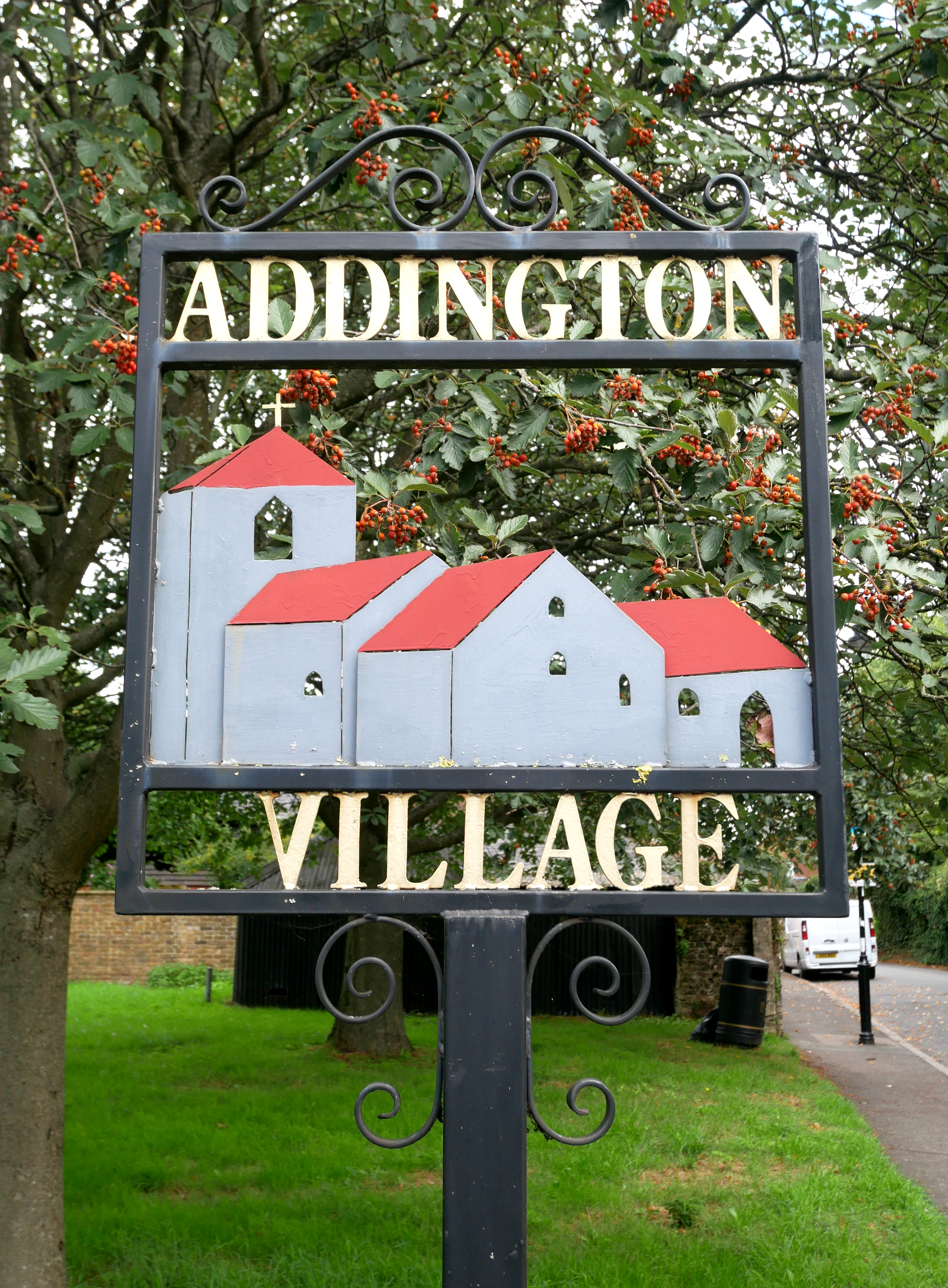
Village sign

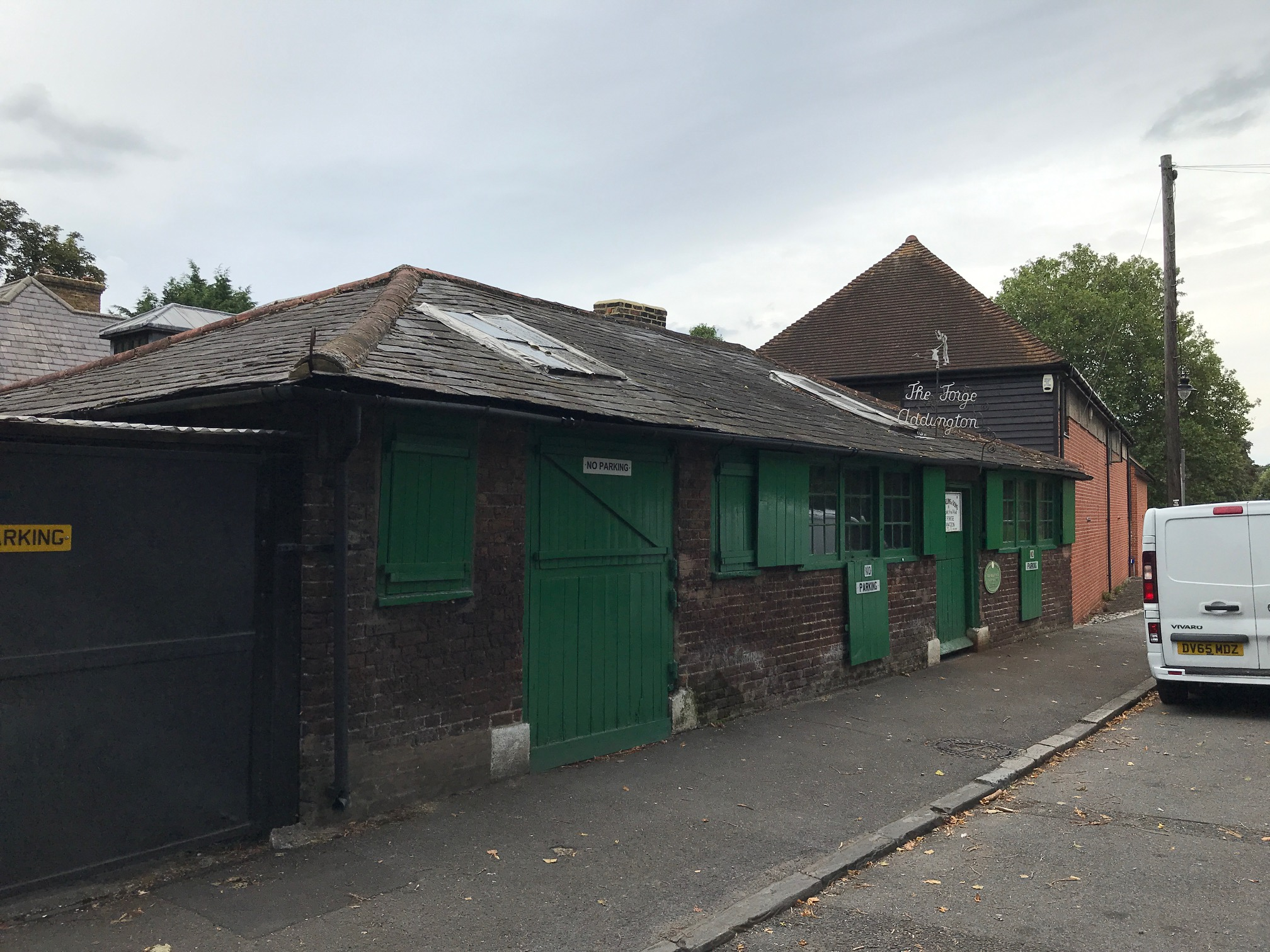
Old village forge, dating to do the 18th century

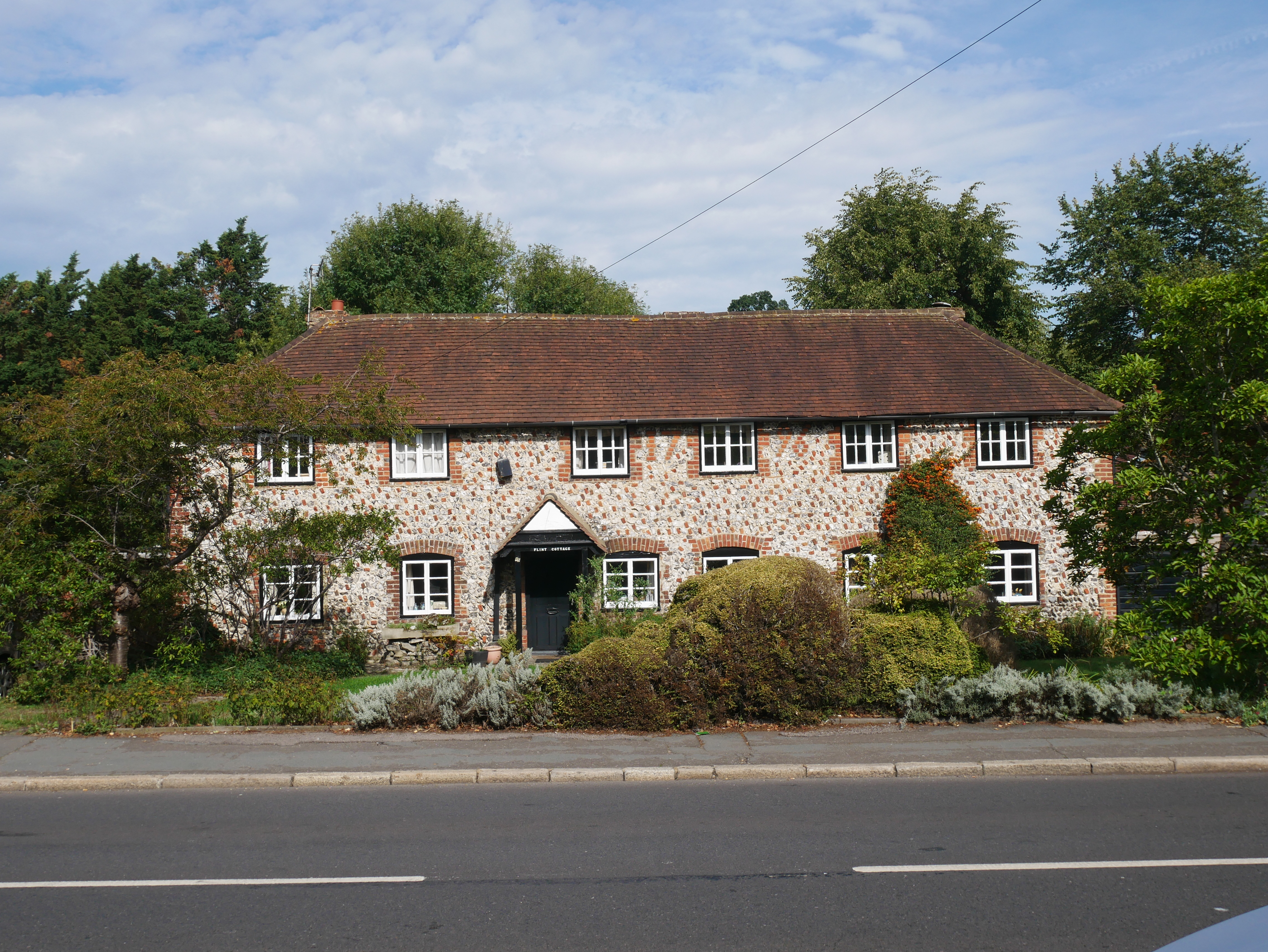
Flint Cottage, built 1796 and now listed at grade II

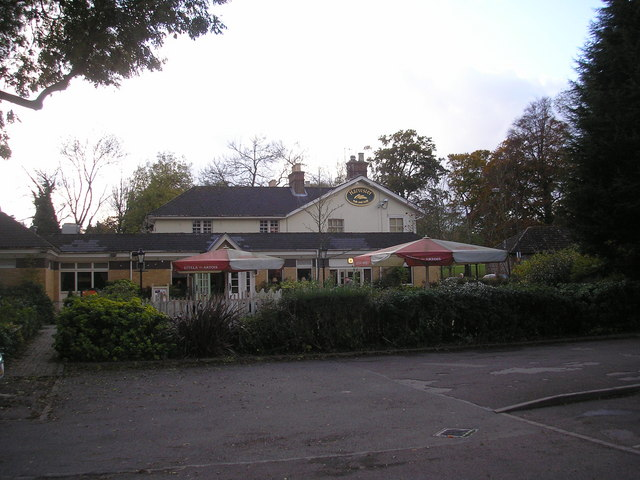
The Cricketers (Harvester) pub

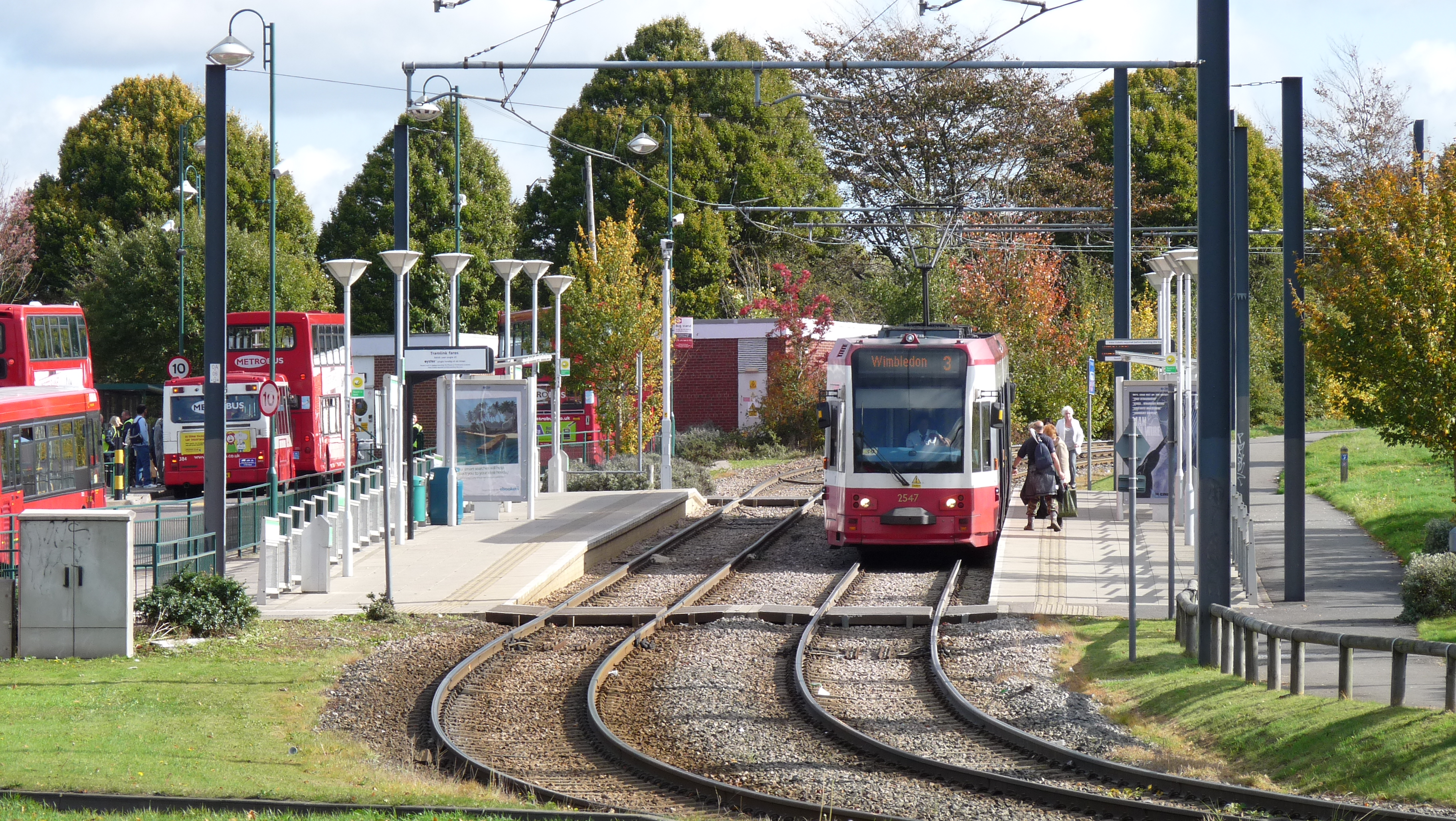
Addington Village tram stop

== See also ==
- Addington, New Zealand - a Christchurch suburb, named after Addington Palace, the summer residence of John Sumner.
