= Jesse Clayson =

Jesse Alec Maynard Clayson (12 June 1905 – 21 August 1971) was an Anglican priest: he was the archdeacon of Croydon from 1957 to 1967; and an Honorary Chaplain to the Queen from 1965.

Clayson was educated at Dover Grammar School and King's College London and ordained in 1935. After a curacy at St Stephen, Norbury he was a Royal Naval chaplain aboard HMS Newcastle, then vicar of Holy Trinity, Dover. He was vicar of St Stephen, Norbury from 1940 to 1945 and then secretary to the Canterbury Diocesan Board of Finance from 1945 to 1967.

Church of England titles
Preceded by Charles Frederick Tonks	Archdeacon of Croydon; 1948–1957	Succeeded by John Taylor Hughes
