= Chris Skilton =

Christopher John Skilton (born 19 March 1955) is a former Archdeacon of Croydon and Archdeacon of Lambeth.

He was educated at Magdalene College, Cambridge and ordained in 1981. After curacies at Ealing and Wimborne he became Team Vicar of St Paul's Great Baddow. From 1995 to 2003 he was the Team Rector of Sanderstead.

He was collated Archdeacon of Croydon at Southwark Cathedral on 14 April 2013; he retired effective 29 February 2020.

Church of England titles
Preceded by Nick Baines	Archdeacon of Lambeth; 2004–2013	Succeeded by Simon Gates
Preceded by Tony Davies	Archdeacon of Croydon; 2013–2020	Succeeded by Rosemarie Mallett
