= Croydon Cenotaph =

War memorial in London

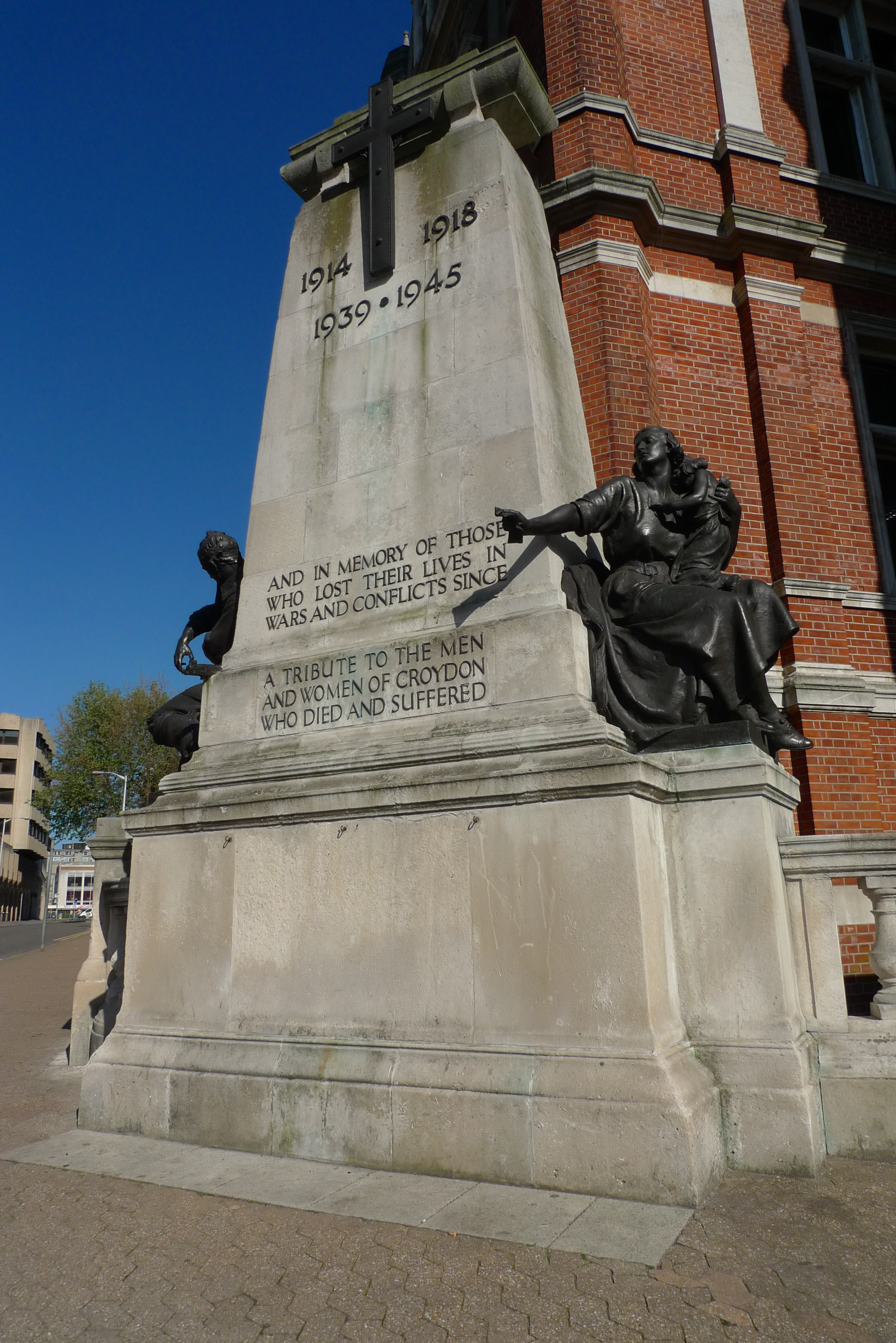
- The cenotaph in 2010
- Interactive map of Croydon Cenotaph
- Location: Katharine Street, Croydon, London, England
- Coordinates: 51.372281°N 0.099355°W
- Designer: James Burford; Paul Raphael Montford (sculptor)
- Material: Portland stone; Bronze statues
- Opening date: 21 October 1921
- Dedicated to: War dead

Croydon Cenotaph is a war memorial, in Croydon, London, England. It is located outside the Croydon Clocktower arts complex (historically Croydon Town Hall), on Katharine Street in Croydon.

The cenotaph, made from Portland stone, was designed by James Burford ARIBA and was unveiled on 22 October 1921, to commemorate local victims of the First World War.

It is framed by two bronze statues of seated figures by Paul Raphael Montford, cast at the M. Maneti foundry. One depicts a soldier of the East Surrey Regiment, dressing his own wounded arm; the other a woman holding a child in her left arm and a letter in her outstretched right hand: her distress is evident, and "[w]e must presume that the news of her husband's perhaps fatal wounds has just reached her". The figure of the soldier was exhibited at the Royal Academy in 1921.

The cenotaph's inscription reads:

1914 ⋅ 1918
1939 ⋅ 1945

AND IN MEMORY OF THOSE

WHO LOST THEIR LIVES IN
WARS AND CONFLICTS SINCE

A TRIBUTE TO THE MEN
AND WOMEN OF CROYDON

WHO DIED AND SUFFERED

The dates "1939 ⋅ 1945" were added after the end of the Second World War. The lines "AND IN MEMORY ... SINCE" were added in 1997.

The cenotaph was granted Grade II listed status on 19 November 1973, both in its own right and as part of a group of municipal buildings, legally protecting it from unauthorised modification or demolition. Its status was upgraded to Grade II* on 27 July 2017.

A roll of honour is kept in the library.

== See also ==
- Grade II* listed war memorials in England
