= William Howley =

Archbishop of Canterbury from 1828 to 1842

The Most Reverend and Right Honourable William Howley
- Archbishop of Canterbury
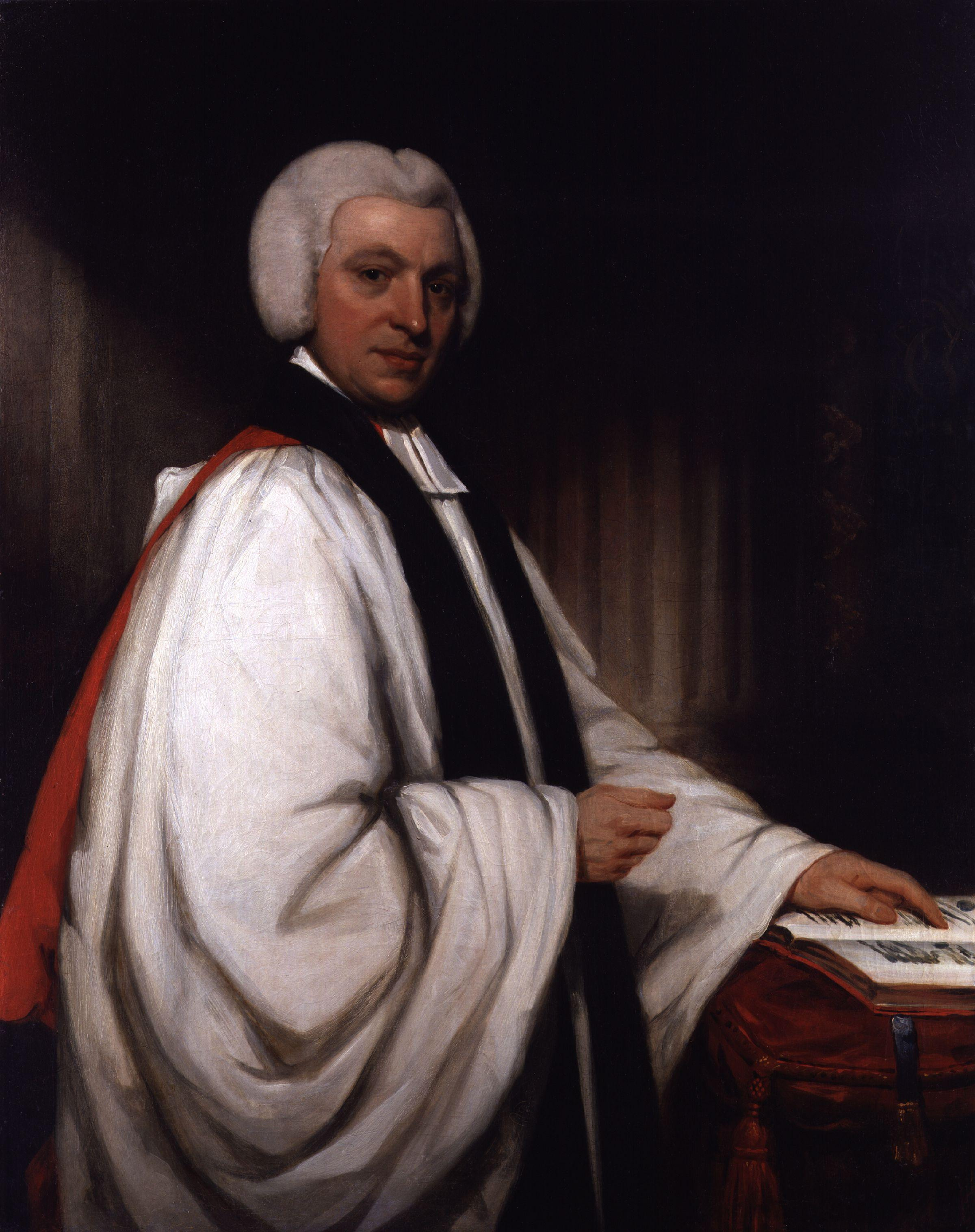
- Portrait by William Owen
- Province: Canterbury
- Diocese: Canterbury
- See: Canterbury
- Installed: 1828
- Term ended: 1848
- Predecessor: Charles Manners-Sutton
- Successor: John Bird Sumner

Orders
- Consecration: 10 October 1813 by Charles Manners-Sutton

Personal details
- Born: 12 February 1766 Ropley, Hampshire, England
- Died: 11 February 1848 (aged 81) Lambeth, Surrey, England
- Buried: St Mary the Blessed Virgin Church, Addington, London
- Spouse: Mary Frances Belli
- Children: 5

William Howley (12 February 1766 – 11 February 1848) was a clergyman in the Church of England. He served as Archbishop of Canterbury from 1828 to 1848.

== Early life, education, and interests ==
Howley was born in 1766 at Ropley, Hampshire, where his father was vicar. He was educated at Winchester College and in 1783 went to New College, Oxford. He became Chaplain to the Marquess of Abercorn in 1792, whose influence was critical in advancing his early career. In 1809 he was appointed Regius Professor of Divinity at Oxford University (as well as previously becoming a Fellow of Winchester and a Canon of Christ Church, Oxford in 1804).

He was an active English Freemason, having joined the 'Royal York Lodge' in Bristol on 21 December 1791, aged 25, and served the lodge regularly until around the turn of the century, including serving as Master of the Lodge.

In October 1813, at Lambeth Palace, he was consecrated Bishop of London, a post he was to occupy until 1828, when he became Archbishop of Canterbury.

== Life as Archbishop of Canterbury ==
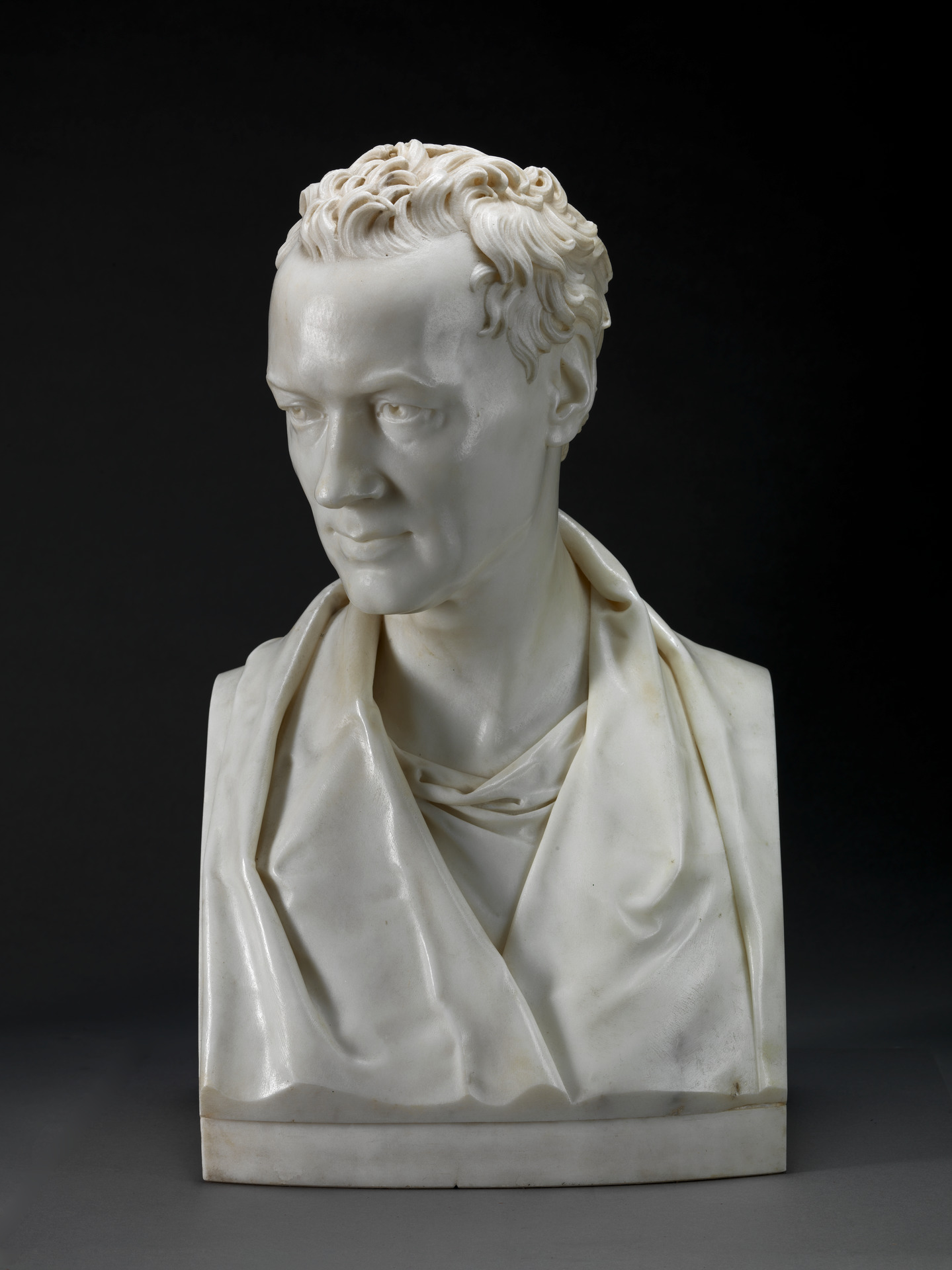
Marble bust of Howley by Francis Chantrey, 1821. Yale Center for British Art

Howley was Archbishop during the Sacramental Test Act 1828 (repealing the Test and Corporation Acts), the Roman Catholic Relief Act 1829 and the Great Reform Act 1832. The bench of bishops was generally opposed to all three measures. As archbishop, Howley was their spokesman, and his heart-felt opposition to the Great Reform Act led to his carriage being attacked in the streets of Canterbury.

Like very many other bishops at that time, Howley was an "old-High Churchman." These inherited a tradition of high views of the sacraments from the Caroline Divines and their successors. They held Catholic beliefs but were consistently anti-Roman. In this they differed from the more extreme Tractarians and their beliefs were often obscured, for example, in Richard William Church's classic account of the Oxford Movement.

Archbishop Howley presided over the coronation of William IV and Queen Adelaide in 1831. He supported William IV in blocking the appointment of Connop Thirwall.

At 5.00 a.m. on 20 June 1837, accompanied by the Lord Chamberlain, the Marquess Conyngham, the Archbishop went to Kensington Palace to inform Princess Victoria that she was now Queen of the United Kingdom of Great Britain and Ireland. He presided at her coronation on 28 June 1838.

Architecture was of particular interest to him. During his career, he initiated the renovation and rebuilding of: his official house at Oxford, his town residence while Bishop of London (32 St James's Square), Fulham Palace (also while he was Bishop of London), and finally, extensive renovations to Lambeth Palace. This last project was a virtual reconstruction of the Palace carried out by Edward Blore, the work beginning after 1828 and done mainly in the Gothic Revival style. It took several years and cost upwards of £60,000.

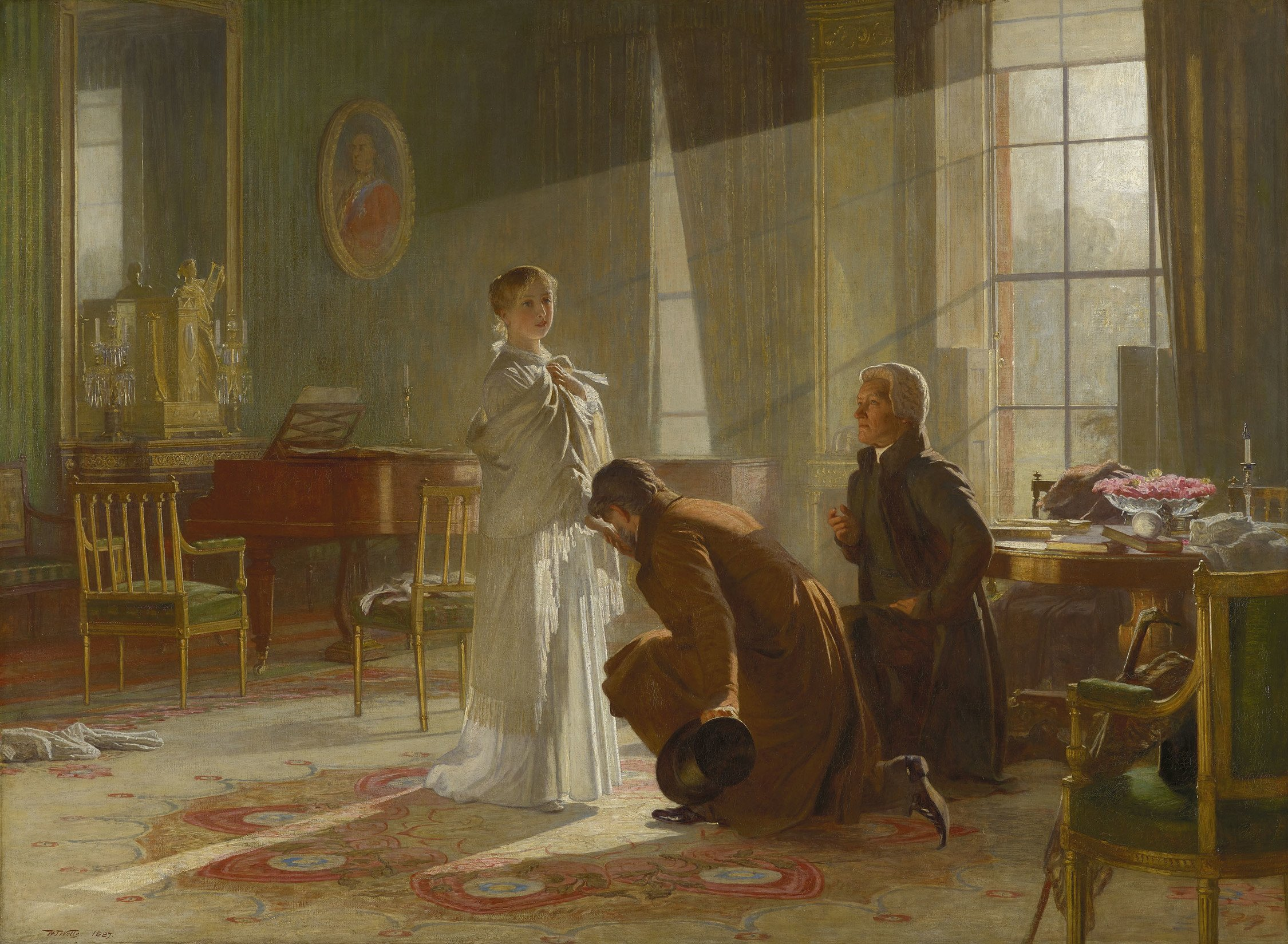
Victoria Regina by Henry Tanworth Wells. Queen Victoria receiving the news of her accession to the throne. The archbishop is on the right.

== Family life ==
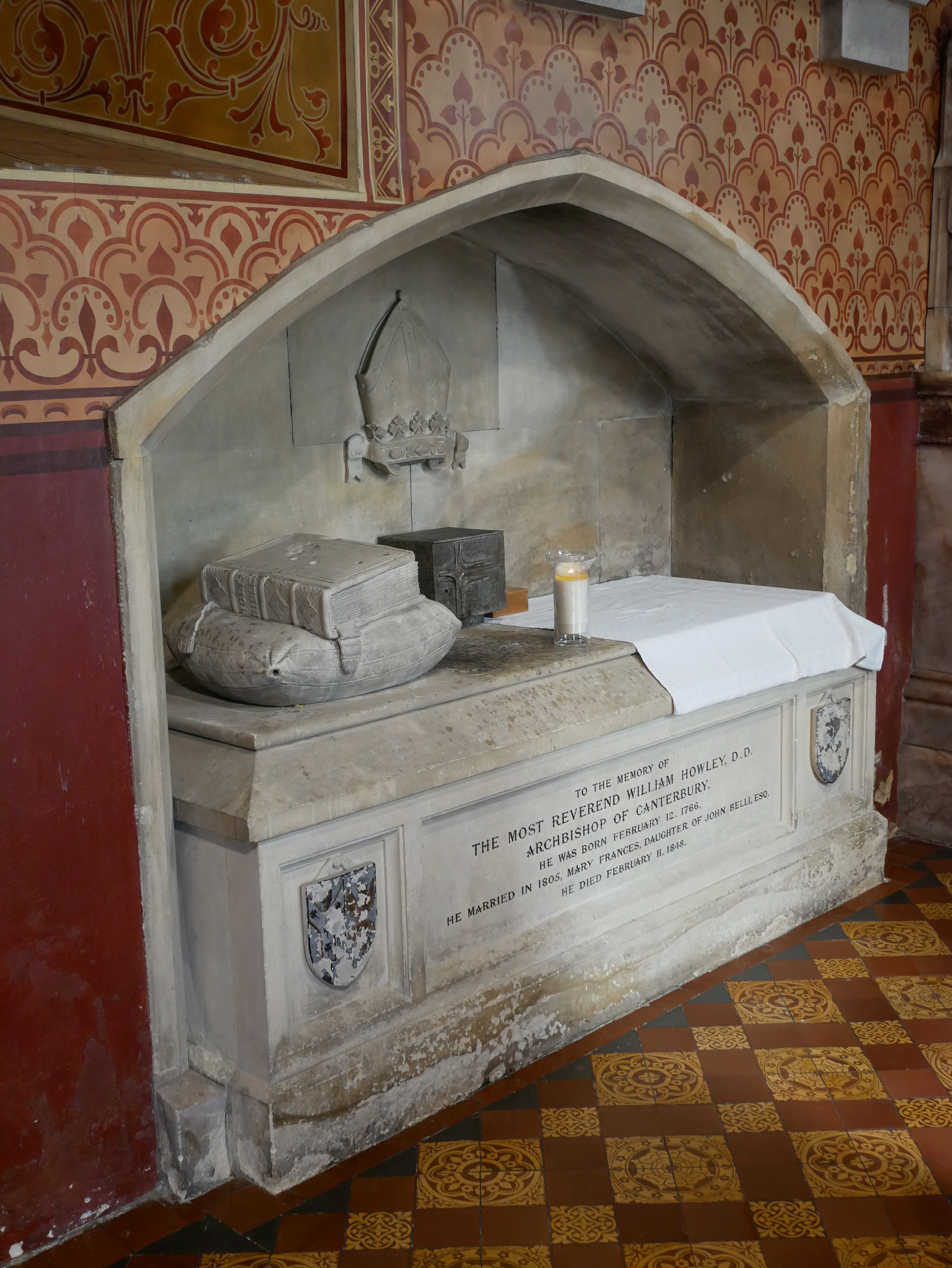
The memorial to Howley in the chancel of the Church of Saint Mary the Blessed Virgin, Addington

William Howley was married on 29 August 1805 to Mary Frances Belli, a daughter of John Belli, EICS, (1740–1805) of Southampton who had been Private Secretary to Warren Hastings. The Howleys had two sons and three daughters; neither son reached adulthood. One of his daughters married Sir George Howland Willoughby Beaumont, a nephew of Sir George Beaumont, 7th Baronet. William Howley died in 1848 1 day before his 82nd birthday, and was interred at Addington after an elaborate funeral.

== Arms ==
Coat of arms of William Howley
Notes While serving as a bishop Howley's arms would be displayed impaled with the arms of the diocese and topped by a mitre. Escutcheon Azure an eagle displayed Ermine on his breast a cross patonce of the field.

Academic offices
Preceded by Charles Henry Hall	Regius Professor of Divinity at Oxford; 1809–1813	Succeeded by William Van Mildert
Church of England titles
Preceded by John Randolph	Bishop of London; 1813–1828	Succeeded by Charles James Blomfield
Preceded by Charles Manners-Sutton	Archbishop of Canterbury; 1828–1848	Succeeded by John Bird Sumner
