= Archdeacon of Croydon =

Church of England ecclesiastical office

The Archdeacon of Croydon is a senior ecclesiastical officer within the Diocese of Southwark. As such the deacon is responsible for the disciplinary supervision of the clergy within its five rural deaneries: Croydon Addington, Croydon Central, Croydon North, Croydon South and Sutton.

== History ==
The archdeaconry was created in the Diocese of Canterbury from the Archdeaconry of Maidstone by Order in Council on 1 April 1930 and transferred to the Diocese of Southwark on 1 January 1985.

== List of archdeacons ==
- 1930 – 1937 (res.): Edward Woods, Bishop suffragan of Croydon
- 1930 – 1942 (res.): William Anderson, Bishop suffragan of Croydon
- 1942 – 1946 (res.): Harold Bradfield
- 1946 – 1947 (res.): Maurice Harland (also Bishop suffragan of Croydon since 1942)
- 1948 – 27 March 1957 (d.): Charles Tonks
- 1957 – 1967 (res.): Jesse Clayson
- 1967 – 1977 (ret.): John Hughes (also Bishop suffragan of Croydon since 1956)
- 1978 – 1993 (res.): Frederick Hazell

The archdeaconry was transferred to Southwark diocese on 1 January 1985.

- 1994 – 17 September 2011 (ret.): Tony Davies (afterwards archdeacon emeritus)
- 2011 – 1 February 2013 (ret.): Barry Goodwin (Acting)
- 14 April 2013 – 29 February 2020 (ret.): Chris Skilton
- 15 March 2020 – 24 June 2022: Rosemarie Mallett (became Bishop of Croydon)
- 4 December 2023 – present: Greg Prior
