= SB Phoenician =

Thames sailing barge, United Kingdom

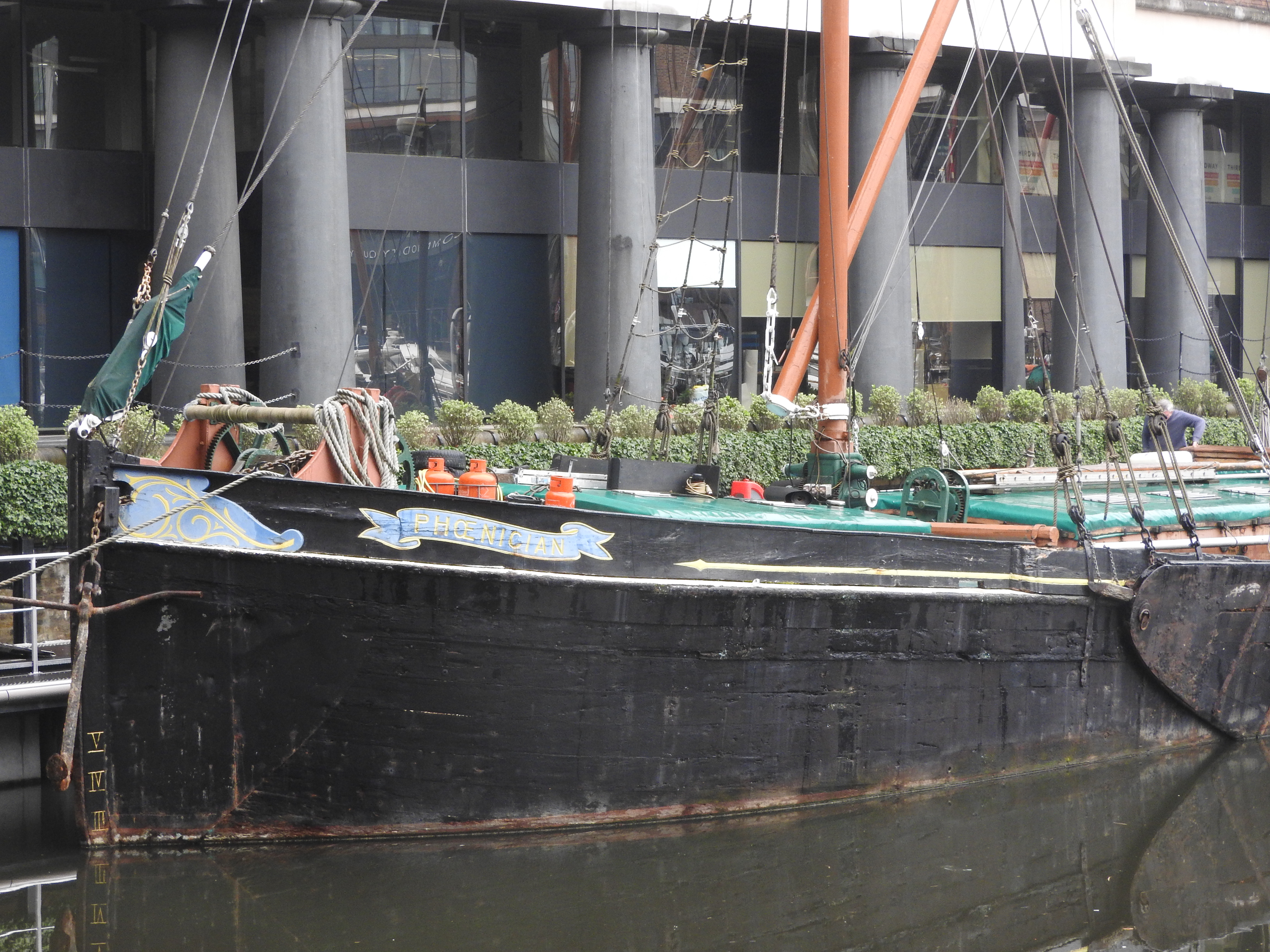
- Sailing barge Phoenician in St Katharine Docks, 2018

History

United Kingdom
- Name: Phoenician
- Owner: R Sully (E A Horlock skipper) and she traded until 1973; Albert Groom for chartering and community purposes (1973–2000); John F Hunt (2000–2018)
- Builder: Wills & Packham, Sittingbourne, Kent.
- Laid down: 1922
- Launched: 1923
- Identification: Official Number 146700; National historic ship 219
- Status: In service

General characteristics
- Class & type: Thames sailing barge
- Tons burthen: 81
- Length: 84.5 ft (25.8 m)
- Beam: 20 ft (6.1 m)
- Draught: 2 ft (0.61 m)approx
- Depth of hold: 6.98 ft (2.13 m)approx
- Propulsion: Sail (1922-1940); Motor barge (1940-1980); Sail and auxiliary Gardner 6LXB diesel 180 HP (1980- 2018)
- Sail plan: sprit mainsail, topsail, mizzen.
- Capacity: 200 tonnes
- Complement: 2
- Notes: Website:https://www.johnfhunt.co.uk

Phoenician is a wooden Thames sailing barge constructed in Sittingbourne in 1922. She was derigged after an accident in 1940. She left trade in 1973. In the 1980s, she was re-rigged to her original specification.

== History ==
The barge was built by Wills & Packham, Sittingbourne in 1906 for E.A. Horlock and Alfred Sully. Both had 32 shares, but Sully was the managing owner, Horlock was the skipper. She was the last wooden Thames sailing barge to be built. A condition of build was that she should be able to go through Mutford Lock at Lowestoft and trade along the Waveney up to Beccles.

Bob Roberts described her as a "champion racing barge, a fast specially built model with magnificent leeboards, a beautifulstanding spread of canvas and a log run aft to give her speed."

Her career as a cargo carrying sailing barge came to an abrupt end in 1940 when a British military aircraft crashed into her deck. The fire destroyed her sails and rigging. The damage was cleared and she served out the war as an ammunition lighter. In 1947 she was rebuilt as a motor barge, and continued in trade until 1973.

She was bought by a retired antiques dealer Alfred Groom, who in the 1980s had her restored. Groom, as a cancer survivor passed the ownership to the Alfred Groom Trust charity his aim being to convert her into a holiday ship for handicapped people and their nurses. The barge which was worth around £100,000 lay in Pin Mill on the River Orwell in Suffolk. Albert managed to get a Board of Trade certificate in readiness to carry 40 nurses and patients during their coastal trips. He died in 1983 before the project was completed. The Phoenician was restored to its original specification, and resumed racing and coastal work as a barge yacht. She was based at St Katharine Docks. The Trust continued until 14 February 2000.

Bubble cars were popular with coastal barge skippers, and Albert had bought a secondhand Messerschmitt KR200 which was stored in the hold, and eventually refurbished.

John F Hunt bought the Phoenician from the Trust around 2000, and did a further restoration and raced her once more. She was damaged in a racing accident in 2009, and while being repaired at Maldon when suffered further damage in the heavy frost and snow of 2010. In 2018 she is static in the St Katharine Docks and again is a venue for corporate events.

== Description ==
The Phoenician was a typical wooden Thames barge, characteristic of the year she was constructed. She was the last wooden Thames sailing barge to be built. She was 84.1 feet (25.6 m) in length, with a beam 20.8 feet (6.3 m) and a depth of side of 7.3 feet (2.2 m). She carried 6,000 square feet (560 m^{2}). Her hull was constructed of pitch pine and oak, using a double skinned lapped plank method.

Sails on a Thames barge

== See also ==
- Thalatta
- Will (Will Everard)
- Kathleen (1901 barge)

== Bibliography ==
- "Phoenician | National Historic Ships". www.nationalhistoricships.org.uk.
- Carr, Frank (1951). Sailing Barges (Revised ed.). Peter Davies Ltd.
- Benham, Hervey; Kershaw, Philip; Finch, Roger (1986). Down tops'l: the story of the East Coast sailing-barges (3rd ed.). London: Harrap. ISBN 0-245-54487-9.
- Hunt. "Phoenician's History | Thames Sailing Barge n". John F Hunt.
- March, Edgar (1948). Spritsail barges of Thames and Medway. London: Percival Marshal.
