= Jane Benham =

English painter and sailor

Jane Mary Benham MBE (28 January 1943 – June 1992) was an English painter and sailor who was instrumental in the formation and operation of the East Coast Sail Trust.

== Early life ==
Born in Colchester, Essex, Jane Benham was the daughter of Hervey Benham and a granddaughter of William Gurney Benham, who between them edited the Essex County Standard from 1884 to 1964. Her father was also a prolific author of books, in particular about sailing and shipping on the east coast.

She was brought up in Fingringhoe and West Mersea, Essex, and educated at St Mary's School, Colchester and St Felix School, Southwold.

== Artist and benefactor ==
Benham was a prolific and accomplished artist, painting mainly small works in oils, acrylics, and watercolour, principally of Essex coastal scenes.

She was a strong and generous supporter of several charities, as well as a number of individuals whose hardship came to her notice.

When not at sea, Benham lived during most of her life at Maldon, Essex. She died from cancer, aged 49, in 1992.

== East Coast Sail Trust ==
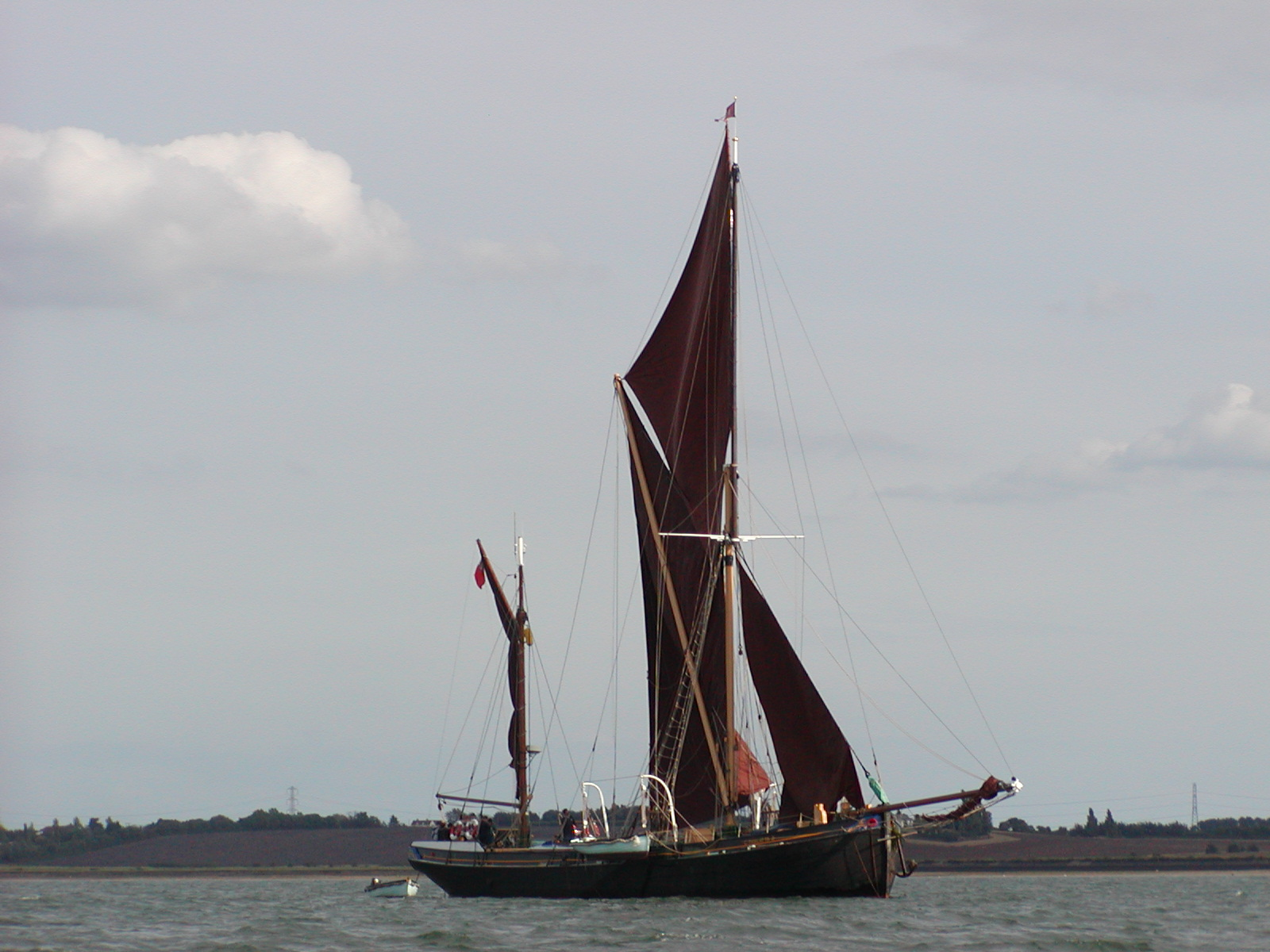
Sailing Barge Thalatta in the River Blackwater

With John Kemp, master mariner and author, and his wife, Monica Kemp, Benham was one of the founders of the East Coast Sail Trust, a charitable organization devoted to the preservation of Thames sailing barges and the character-building of young people through sail training.

The Trust owned and operated two sailing barges, known as schoolships: the 150-ton burthen Thalatta and the 200-ton Sir Alan Herbert, both coasting spritsail barges, rigged with ketch mizzens. The latter vessel was procured through an appeal made in memory of the famous humourist, novelist, playwright and one-time member of parliament A. P. Herbert.

Benham was a major figure in the development of the Trust's work, carried out much of its administration, and served as Mate of its barge Memory from 1965 to 1966 and then as Mate of Thalatta from 1967 to 1992.

The Trust’s sail-training programme was dubbed 'A Week in Another World'. During their stay on board the schoolships, children and their accompanying teachers or youth leaders explored the east coast of England between North Foreland in the south and Orfordness in the north, living on board and working the vessels under sail. Many thousands of young people from all over Britain and other parts of the world have benefited from this unique experience.

In the 1986 New Year Honours, Benham was appointed a Member of the Most Excellent Order of the British Empire for her work with the East Coast Sail Trust. A further mark of the impact she made is the institution of an annual memorial lecture in her honour, which continues.

The Trust continues to operate today, based at Maldon, Essex, and the sailing barge Thalatta is undergoing a major overhaul and rebuild at the barge yard at St Osyth, largely supported by lottery funding. The name Thalatta originates from the Greek word meaning the sea (see Thalatta! Thalatta!). The Sir Alan Herbert is no longer in the hands of the Trust, and has reverted to her original name, Lady Jean.
