= SB Ena =

Wooden barge

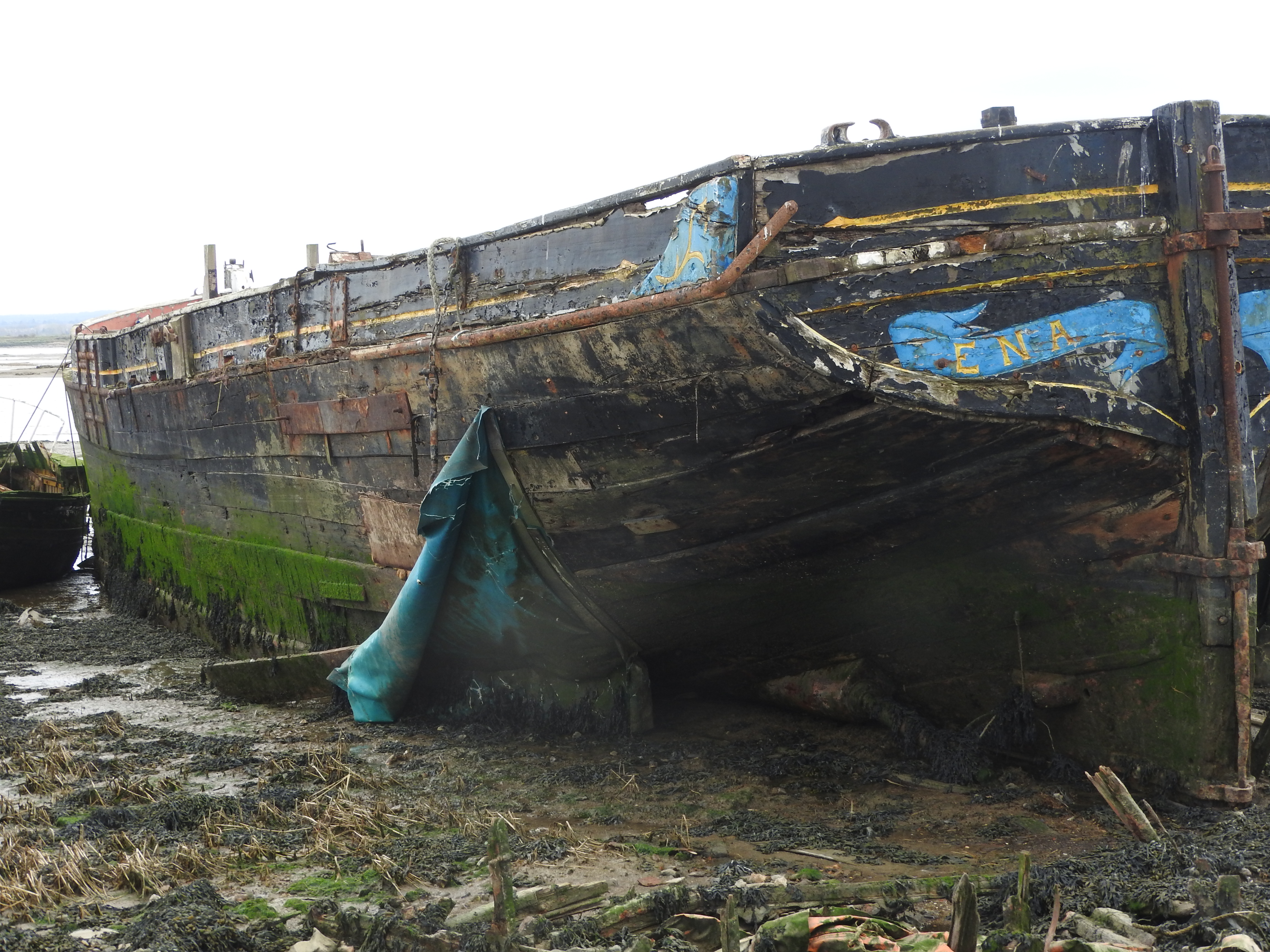
- Ena lying on the mud at Hoo, 2018

History

United Kingdom
- Name: Ena
- Owner: R & W Paul Ltd (1906–2001); Luke Deards (2001–?)
- Builder: McLearon, Harwich, Essex, UK
- Launched: 1906
- Identification: Official Number 122974; National historic ship 199
- Status: Lying in the marshes

General characteristics
- Class & type: Thames sailing barge
- Tons burthen: 73
- Length: 88.13 ft (26.86 m)
- Beam: 20.6 ft (6.3 m)
- Draught: 2 ft (0.61 m)approx
- Depth of hold: 6.89 ft (2.10 m)approx
- Propulsion: Sail (1906–1948); Ruston diesel engine (1948–1974); Sail and auxiliary Gardner diesel (1974–2001)
- Sail plan: mulie rig sprit mainsail, topsail, mizzen, gaff rigged with boom.
- Capacity: 150 tonnes
- Complement: 2
- Notes: Served in both World War I as an ammunition barge, and in World War II in the Dunkirk evacuation. Focus of 2002, first series of the Salvage Squad.

The Ena is a wooden Thames sailing barge constructed in Harwich in 1906 that is resting on the flats adjacent to Stargate Marina in Hoo, Kent. She is a notable Dunkirk little ship reputed to have rescued 100 men.

In 2002, Ena was the focus of an episode of the Channel 4 TV series Salvage Squad.

== History ==
The barge was built speculatively by W B McLearon at the Navy Yard slip, Harwich in 1906. R & W Paul Ltd, the grain and agricultural merchants, bought her in 1907 to use in the grain trade. This was the second barge they had bought from W B McLearon's Navy Yard, after the Thalatta. They rigged her as a mulie in their own Dock End Shipyard.

=== First World War service ===
Ena served in the First World War, delivering supplies across the Channel to troops in France. Her shallow draught allowed her to operate in waters too shallow for the enemy U-boats.

=== Dunkirk evacuation ===
Thirteen Thames sailing barges made the crossing, six from R & W Paul Ltd's fleet. On the Dunkirk beaches, her crew was ordered to abandon her. She was beached but then refloated by Lt Colonel W G Mc Kay and men of the 19th Field Regiment, Royal Artillery, and taken back to Kent, notable as none of them was a sailorman.

== See also ==
- Thalatta
- Will (Thames barge)
