= John Arthur Kemp =

John Kemp
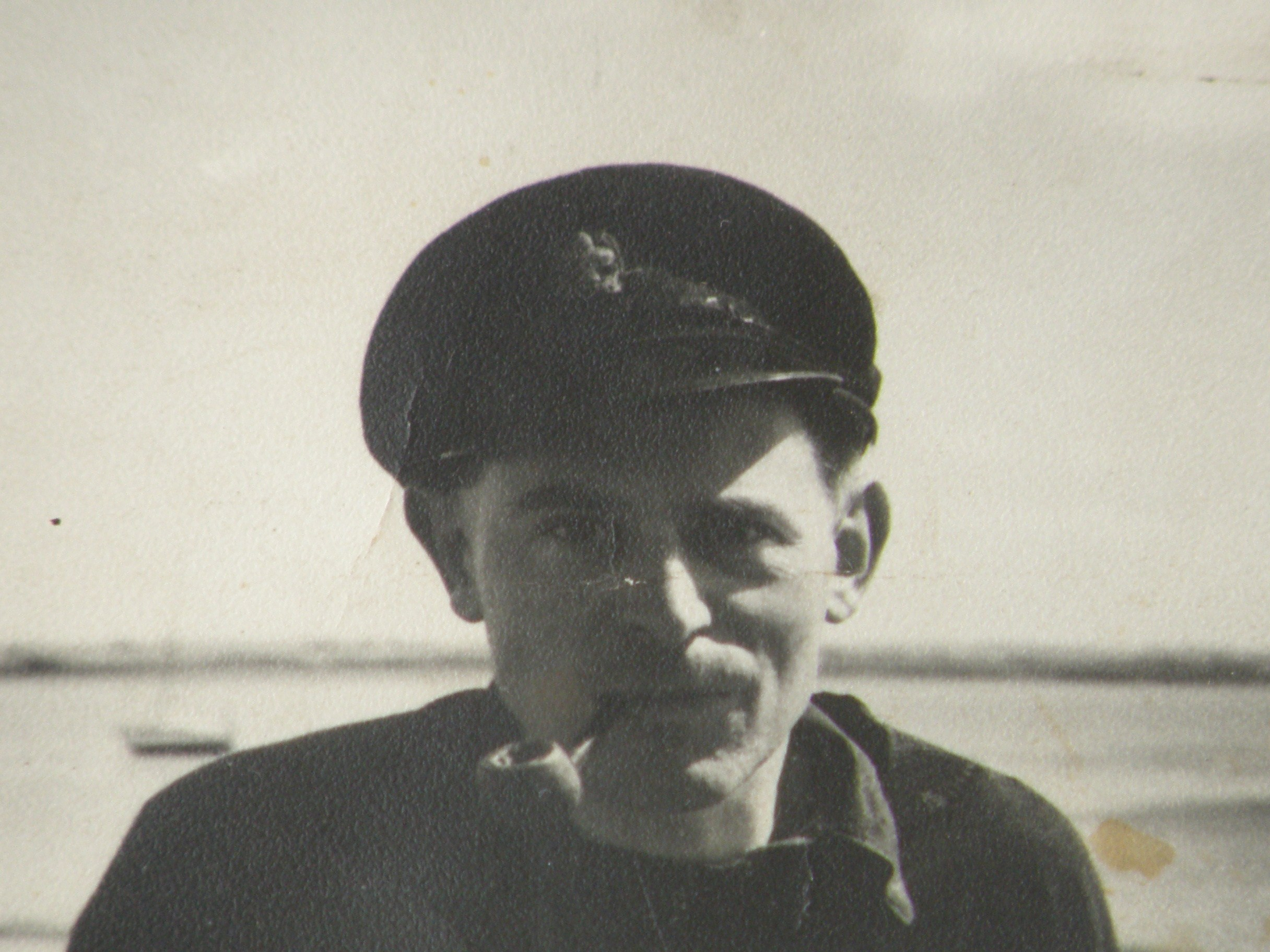
- John Kemp, Millbeach, 1960s
- Born: 1926; London, England
- Died: 1987 (aged 60–61); Maldon, Essex
- Occupations: Master mariner, educationalist, author
- Writing career
- Genres: Autobiography, novel, short stories
- Notable works: A Fair Wind for London, God's Hungry Sheep, At The Wash of Oysters.

John Kemp (1926–1987) created and ran the East Coast Sail Trust, a charitable institution devoted to both character building for young people through education at sea, and preservation of Thames sailing barges. The Trust has been running for over 40 years, during which time many thousands of young people from Britain and around the world, have benefited from the experience that is provided. His earlier work on the preservation of Thames sailing barges was instrumental in the continued existence of the fleet today. He was also the author of three books and a prolific writer of newspaper and magazine articles.

== Biography ==
John Kemp was born in London. Before he was old enough for full-time military service, John Kemp served in the Home Guard, wearing the capbadges of the Gloucestershire Regiment and the Essex Regiment. He was conscripted into the Bedfordshire and Hertfordshire Regiment in 1944, and served until 1946.

During and immediately after the Second World War Kemp and his mother, Lucy, lived in Essex and in the West Country. His father, Arthur, who was once 'Larry Lynx', racing correspondent for The People newspaper, died soon after the war ended. John Kemp married Monica in 1957, and they had three sons and a daughter. Before taking full-time responsibility for his schoolship scheme, he was involved in the construction of Bradwell nuclear power station, and was employed by Shell Oil and by E H Bentall and Co, agricultural machinery manufacturers, at Maldon, Essex. He died in command of the sailing barge Thalatta, near the Bench Head at the entrance to the River Blackwater, in September 1987, aged 61.

== Author ==
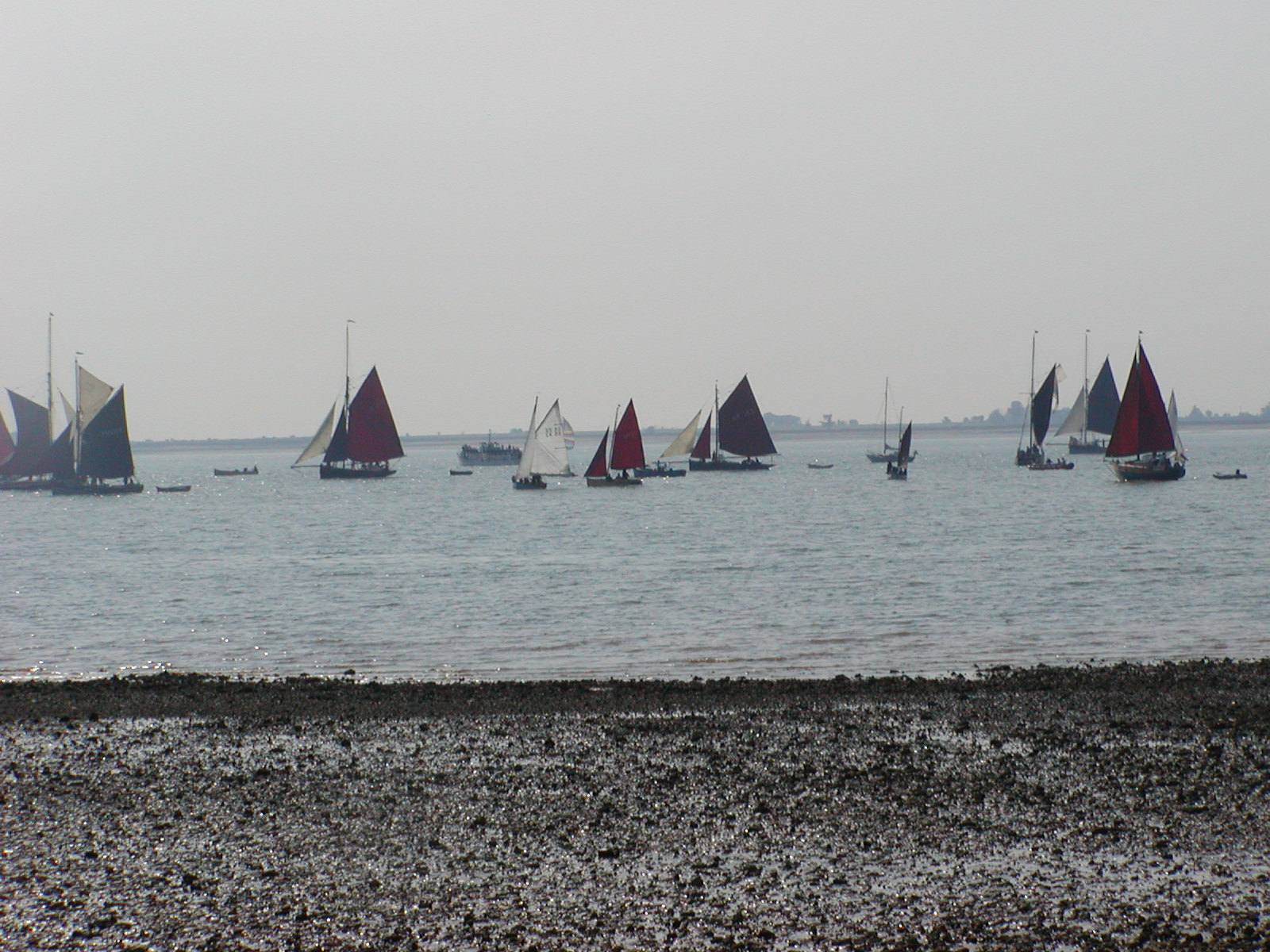
Fishing Smacks at West Mersea, Essex, competing for the Hervey Benham and John Kemp Trophy in the annual oyster dredging competition, September 2004

Kemp was the author of three books. His first, A Fair Wind for London, was a memoir of his life and times on the East Coast, recalling his experiences at sea in working Thames barges, his efforts to preserve sailing barges, and his establishment of the East Coast Sail Trust. The second, God's Hungry Sheep, was a religious novel about the traditionalist movement within the Roman Catholic Church. His final work, At the Wash of Oysters, was a collection of short stories set on the Essex coast and marshland, in a manner not dissimilar to S. L. Bensusan, whose work he greatly admired.

He wrote columns and articles for the local press spanning many years and covering a wide range of subjects. This began when, as a young man in the West Country, he produced a series of political articles. In later years his work, mainly published in the Essex press, included pieces on coastal and marshland life, obituaries, reviews of amateur dramatics and musicals, and short stories.

== Schoolship scheme ==
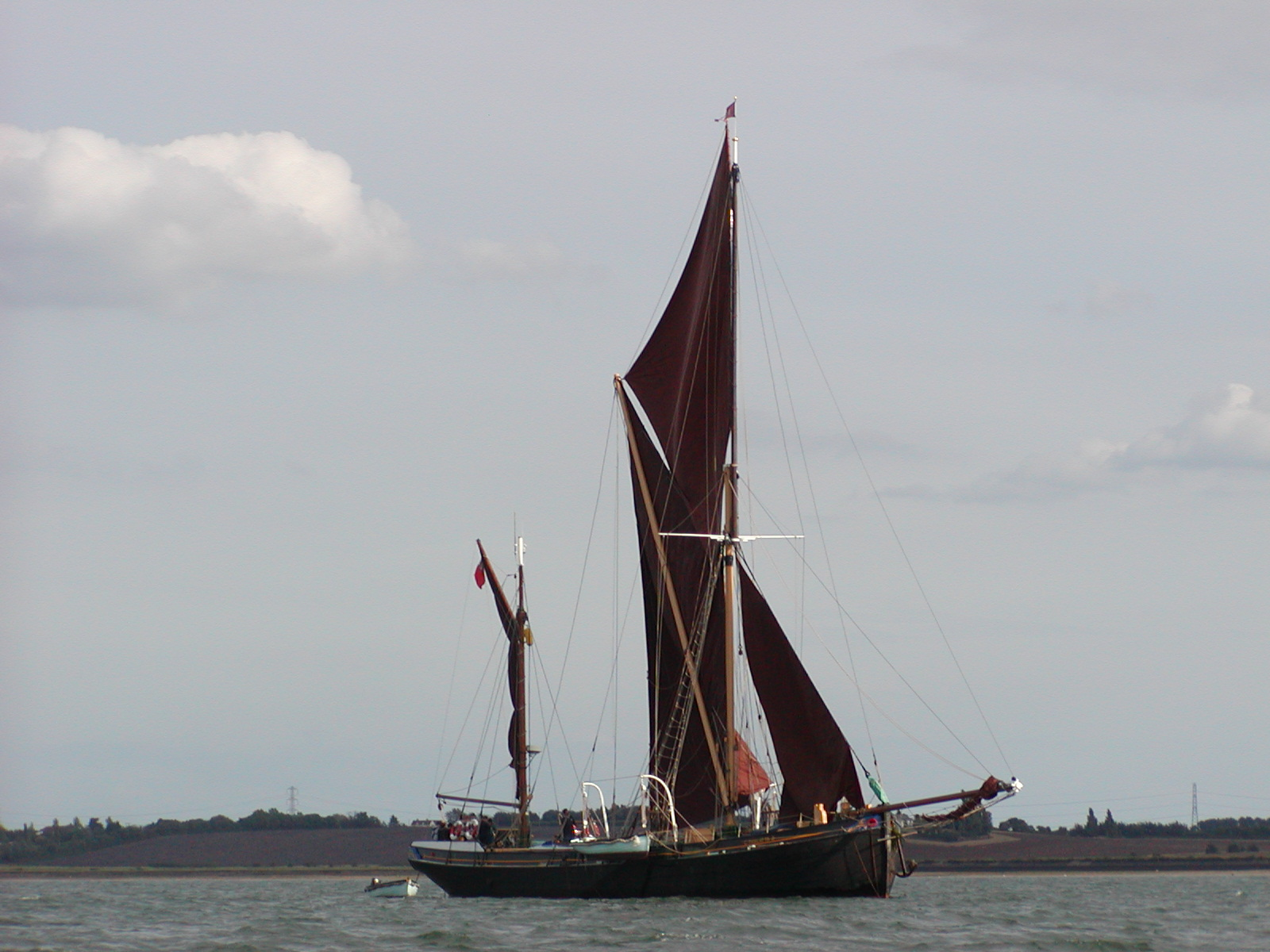
The Thames barge Thalatta in the River Blackwater

Built at the naval yard in Harwich, the Thames barge Thalatta was purchased in February 1906 by F W Horlock. Purchased by Kemp she became, from 1967, a sail training barge for children. In 1971 the East Coast Sail Trust was formed to provide 5-day educational cruises and to preserve the Thames sailing barge. The East Coast Sail Trust owned and operated two sailing barges (known in the Trust as schoolships) the 150 burthen ton Thalatta and the 200 ton Sir Alan Herbert, both coasting spritsail barges, rigged with ketch mizzens. The latter vessel was procured through an appeal made in memory of the famous humourist, novelist, playwright and one-time MP, A. P. Herbert.

The programme was dubbed 'A Week in Another World'. During their stay on board the schoolships, children and their teachers or youth leaders explored the east coast from the North Foreland in the south to Orfordness in the north, living on board and working the vessels under sail. The concept, developed by John Kemp and Jane Benham, was not sail training of the type practised by many similar organizations, nor was it overtly character-building.

Both of these however formed part of an innovative educational concept: the 'floating classroom', in which children explored the communities, geography and ecology of the Thames estuary. Each crew-member had a study project, designed to challenge children of every ability and background. Pupils, generally aged between 13 and 18, voyaging under the East Coast Sail Trust flag, came from comprehensive schools in the most disadvantaged inner London boroughs, leading public and selective schools; and from Germany, the United States of America and Australia.

Funding for the East Coast Sail Trust's work came from a combination of national charitable appeals, masterminded by George A. Jones of Writtle, Essex, grants from councils and education authorities, and contributions from the students taking part. The Trust was overseen by a council, chaired through much of its early existence, by H. Gordon Parker, at the time Chairman of the Felixstowe Dock & Railway Company.Port of Felixstowe : Britain’s Biggest & Busiest Container Port

Hervey Benham, newspaperman and prolific author of works about sailing ships and the east coast of England, also played a role in the development of the schoolship scheme. Much of the Trust's practical and administrative support and accounting was undertaken by John Kemp's wife, Monica Kemp.

The Trust continues to operate today, based at Maldon, Essex and the sailing barge Thalatta is undergoing a major overhaul and rebuild at the barge yard at St Osyth, largely supported by lottery funding. The Sir Alan Herbert is no longer in the hands of the Trust, and has reverted to her original name, Lady Jean.

== Sailing Barge Preservation ==
Before establishing the East Coast Sail Trust, John Kemp had for many years been involved in work to preserve working Thames sailing barges. He was a founder member of the Thames Barge Preservation Society, which purchased the sailing barge Memory, one of the last vessels to trade under sail. He subsequently operated the Memory as a schoolship, along similar lines to the way that the Thalatta would later be employed.

His work in this field was pioneering, and provided the example for several other efforts to preserve and operate sailing barges, for both development of young people and for leisure. A substantial fleet continues to exist today on the Essex and Suffolk coasts, and on the Thames. The riverside town of Maldon, in Essex, is a particular centre for sailing barges, and it was John Kemp who led the way for this with the use of Maldon as home port for the barge Memory and later for the Thalatta.
