= R. & W. Paul Ltd. =

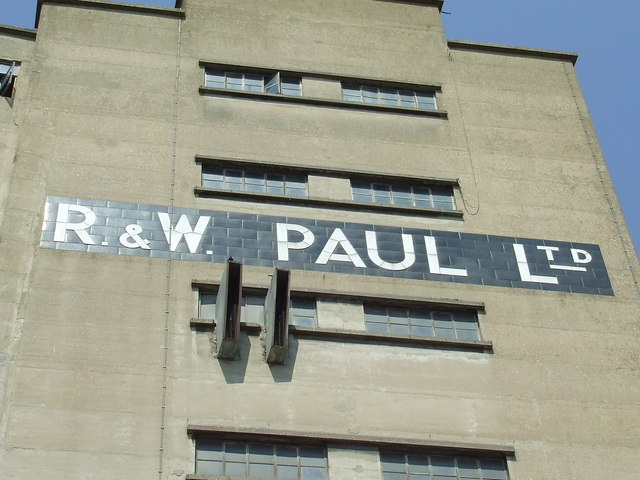

R & W. Paul Ltd. was a malting business that also became involved in shipping and animal feed. By the beginning of the twentieth century it was one of the major businesses in Ipswich.

== Origins ==
The company was founded by Robert Paul (1806-1864) around 1842.

== Shipping ==
Pauls bought the Thames barge Thalatta in August 1933.
