= Florence Bagley =

American psychologist

Florence Winger Bagley
- Born: January 7, 1874; Clay Lick, Pennsylvania
- Died: 1952 (aged 77–78)
- Education: University of Nebraska (A.B., A.M.); Cornell University
- Known for: Psychology
- Spouse: William Chandler Bagley (m. 1901)

Florence Winger Bagley (January 7, 1874 – 1952) was a 20th-century American psychologist. Bagley's work focused on the research of Fechner's color rings and color aesthetics. She was listed in the first biographical compilation of American scientists.

== Early life and education ==
Florence Bagley was born in Clay Lick, Pennsylvania. She was the daughter of Margaret (née Irwin) and Joseph W Winger. Bagley studied at the University of Nebraska and received her A.B. degree in 1895 and A.M. degree in 1898. She then moved to Cornell University in 1898, again as a Fellow in Psychology, holding the Susan Linn Sage Fellowship in Philosophy and Ethics. She completed her doctoral research in 1901 but did not complete writing her dissertation. However, her work was published under the guidance of her supervisor, Edward B. Titchener. She was recognized with membership in Sigma XI from Cornell and was a member of Kappa Kappa Gamma.

== Research ==
Bagley's research in the field of Psychology occurred during her time at the University of Nebraska and Cornell University. However, her professional positions were all unofficial. Bagley's research interests were the aesthetics of color. She investigated the optical illusion of colors appearing to the viewer when a disc with black and white sectors is spun (Prevost-Fechner-Benham Subjective Colors). She conducted a systematic analysis of the response, first described by Fechner. Her work defined that a low rate of rotation was required for this subjective effect. In 1902, Bagley's work "An Investigation of Fechner's Colors" was published in The American Journal of Psychology.

== Personal life ==
During her time at Cornell, Bagley met her husband, William Chander Bagley, who was also in the doctoral program. William completed his degree in 1900 and moved out West for work. Bagley remained at Cornell for another year. However, she did not complete her doctoral degree before leaving for her wedding. The two got married in Lincoln, Nebraska on August 14, 1901. In autumn 1901 her husband obtained a post as principal of Meramec Elementary School in St. Louis, Missouri, and she moved there with him. She gave birth to their first daughter in May 1902. In September, her husband wrote a letter to E.B. Titchener in which he expressed Florence's desire to finish her degree and her willingness to attempt in the future. However, she gave birth to three more children and became busy with the domestic duties as a wife and mother. The family subsequently moved several times and in 1914 she was recorded as living in Dillon, Montana and was described as a writer.

Florence Bagley died in 1952.
