= Fechner =

Fechner is a surname. Notable people with the surname include:

- Carl-A. Fechner (born 1952), German documentary filmmaker
- Christian Fechner (1944–2008), French film producer and screenwriter
- Gino Fechner (born 1997), German footballer
- Gustav Fechner (1801–1887), German experimental psychologist, physicist and philosopher
- Harry Fechner (born 1950), German football defender
- Johannes Fechner (born 1972), German politician
- Max Fechner (1892–1973), Minister of Justice of the GDR
- Robert Fechner (1876–1939), American union leader
- Sebastian Fechner (born 1983), Polish footballer

== See also ==
- Fechner color, an illusion of color
- Weber–Fechner law
- Fechner (crater), a lunar crater
- 11041 Fechner (1989 SH2), a main-belt asteroid discovered on 1989 by E. W. Elst
