= Charles Richardson (cement merchant) =

- Born: February 16, 1817; Woodford, London, United Kingdom
- Died: January 30, 1890 (aged 72); Newton Abbot, Devon
- Occupation: Businessman
- Known for: Founder of the family Brick and Cement Firm A & WT Richardson Ltd
- Spouse: Selina Ellis (m. 1840)
- Children: 5

Charles Richardson (16 February 1817 – 30 January 1890) was a British businessman that was the founder of the family Brick and Cement Firm A & WT Richardson Ltd, which lasted over 100 years.

On 18 October 1840 he married Selina Ellis at Lambeth. The couple had one daughter, Selina Richardson born March 1842 and four sons - Alexander R Richardson born 1847, Walter T Richardson born 1849, Frederick Charles Richardson born 1851 and George Canning Richardson born March 1855.

== Company history ==
The business was founded by Charles Richardson in 1850 with wharves and offices at Vauxhall, (Brunswick Lodge) and Paddington. These premises being the London points of distribution for the London stock bricks and red facing bricks manufactured at Teynham in Kent and at Wood Lane, Shepherd's Bush. Portland cement and Roman cement manufactured at Conyers Quay near Sittingbourne were also handled here.

Charles Richardson commenced business immediately after the repeal of the brick tax which lasted from 1784–1850 and following the demand created for the then "new" Portland Cement first discovered in 1824 by William Aspdin a bricklayer of Leeds.

The White City at Shepherd's Bush now occupies the old site of the Wood Lane Brickworks.

=== Customers ===
More than a million stock bricks were supplied for the foundations of the Albert Memorial. Later, the Company also supplied the bricks used in the foundation of Eros, when that statue by Alfred Gilbert was replaced in Piccadilly Circus.

Early in the 19th century, bricks and Portland cement were also supplied for the Oval cricket ground at Kennington, while much of the early production of cement from the Conyer Works was exported to New Zealand, where the high quality of the product won the Silver Medal at the New Zealand International Exhibition in 1882.

The Company ceased production of cement at Conyer in 1906 and of bricks at Teynham in 1919, but in 1945 with the acquisition of the Auclaye Brickfields Limited, were again producing multi-coloured stock bricks, the bulk of which were supplied to help meet the needs of London's post-war housing problems, many millions being used by the London County Council and the Ministry of Works.

There were premises at the LMS Railway Goods Depot, Wandsworth Road, London SW8.

=== Succession ===
On his death, the founder of the Company was succeeded by his two sons, Mr Alexander R and Mr Walter T Richardson and a partnership formed, to be known by the title of A & W T Richardson until, following the death of Mr Alec Richardson, the firm was formed into a private limited company in 1923, having as its first board of Directors, Mrs A E Watson, Mr Alfred Jefferies Richardson, Mr H W Worsfold and Mr R E Moores, under the Joint Managing Directorship of Admiral C R Watson CMG CIE and Colonel Charles Richardson.

Three members of the family Mrs N M Monsell and Mrs A Sich - granddaughters of the founder, and Mr John W Sich - great grandson, then served the board under the Managing Director Colonel C Richardson - grandson of the founder.

== Sailing barges ==
Charles along with Rowlie Richardson had several Thames sailing barges most named after family members;

Charles Richardson barges
Name	Built	Year	Tons	Official no.	Notes
Active of Rochester	Sittingbourne	1864	37	050302	
Alexander of Rochester	Queenborough	1867	26	058432	
Arthur & Eliza of Rochester	Faversham	1862	38	044092	
Charles of Rochester	Queenborough	1866	36	055175	
Eliza of Rochester	Queenborough	1866	35	055166	
Frank of Rochester	Murston	1870	36	058510	
Glendower of Rochester	Conyer	1893	37	099923	
Heron of Rochester	Milton	1884	40	090967	
Jeffie of Rochester	Conyer	1874	39	067072	
Lydia of Rochester	Conyer	1874	40	067088	
Mabel of Rochester	Conyer	1873	39	067053	
Nesta of Rochester	Conyer	1898	42	109926	
Phoebe of Rochester	Conyer	1876	39	074811	
Victory of Rochester	Wandsworth	1880	44	081880	
William of Rochester	Sittingbourne	1872	35	067035	
Ref					
