= Charles Benham =

English journalist

Charles Edwin Benham
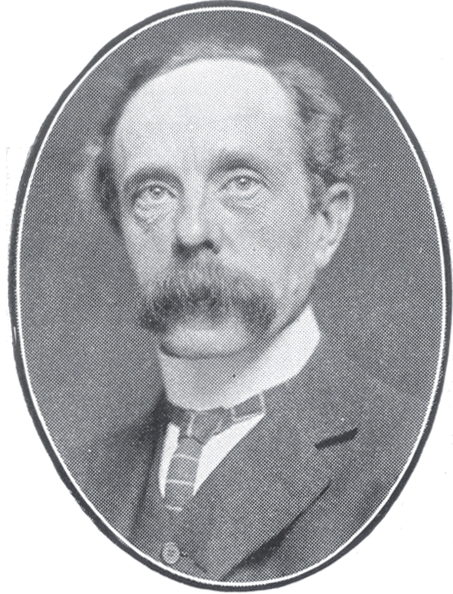
- Born: 15 April 1860; Colchester, Essex, England
- Died: 1 April 1929 (aged 68); Colchester, Essex, England

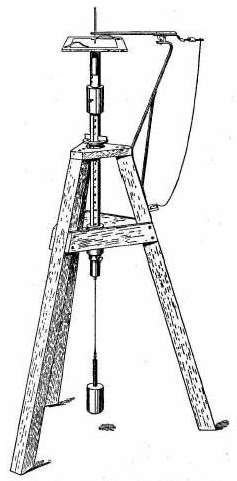
A 1913 illustration of Benham's harmonograph

Charles Edwin Benham JP (/ˈbɛnəm/; 15 April 1860 in Colchester, Essex, England – 1 April 1929, also in Colchester) was a journalist who edited for many years the Essex County Standard, a published author of works such as Essex Ballads, and an amateur scientist-cum-inventor, which led him to create Benham's top, which was named after him.

== Known life and career ==
Born on 15 April 1860 into a family of newspaper proprietors, Benham was educated at Colchester Royal Grammar School but did not attend university. He later returned to the school to become President of the Old Colcestrian Society for old boys of the school. Living in Colchester for all but a handful of years of his life spent with Mebrose printers in Derby - and, in turn, writing about it in many of his books - he helped edit the family-controlled paper the Essex County Standard jointly with his brother William Gurney Benham from 1892 until his death in 1929, which was described as "sudden and unexpected," from angina pectoris whilst in his editorial office for the newspaper. He left a widow.

=== Scientific pursuits ===
In the spare time that his journalistic endeavours provided to him, Benham was a keen amateur scientist and contributor to the journal Nature. His obituary in Nature noted that Benham was "a representative of the type of scientific amateur of which British science has reason to be proud... by faithful observation and original mind he was able to make some notable contributions to knowledge." Most significantly, however, he is credited for his invention of Benham's top, the invention of which was relayed through an 1894 issue of Nature. The disc, when spun, produces the Fechner colour effect of vivid and coloured images of concentric circles, despite neither of these being present in the design. He was inspired to invent the said top after his correspondence with Dr. Gustav Theodor Fechner, who had demonstrated the illusory colour effect which the top propagated to English-speakers.

=== Other pursuits and endeavours ===
Additionally, Benham contributed an essay defending the reputation of William Gilbert, asserting that "though Gilbert's actual discoveries were few and crude, he must be judged rather by the spirit of his work." Other contributions were plentiful in the areas of optics and fluorescence. His exploits were also described in Knowledge and the (English) Journal of Botany. The invention of a "miniature twin elliptic pendulum harmonograph" was also credited to him. It was, according to Archibald Williams, "a good means of entertaining friends at home or elsewhere." In addition, Benham became a justice of the peace in 1917 and was a distinguished artist in his own right, particularly in watercolour.

== Published works ==
- Essex Ballads (1895, 1901)
- William Gilbert of Colchester. A sketch of his magnetic philosophy. (1902)
- Colchester Worthies
- Mate's Illustrated Colchester (1908)
- Descriptive and Practical Details as to Harmonographs (1909)
