= Newton disc =

Coloured disk that appears gray when rotated

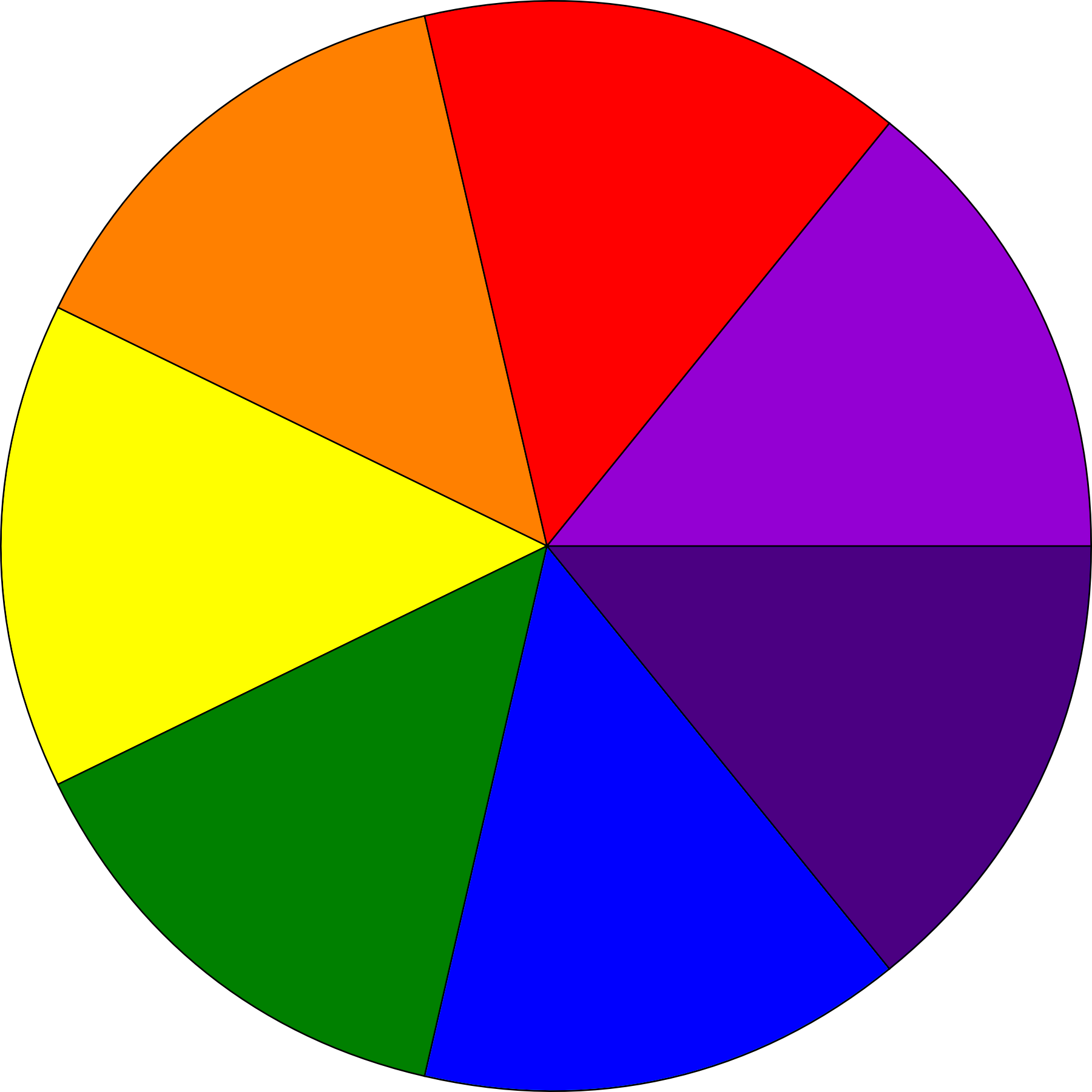
Colour distribution of a Newton disk

The Newton disk, also known as the disappearing color disk, is a well-known physics experiment with a rotating disk with segments in different colors (usually Newton's primary colors: red, orange, yellow, green, blue, indigo, and violet, commonly known by the abbreviation ROYGBIV) appearing as white (or off-white or grey) when it is spun rapidly about its axis.

This type of mix of light stimuli is called temporal optical mixing, a version of additive-averaging mixing. The concept that human visual perception cannot distinguish details of high-speed movements is popularly known as persistence of vision.

The disk is named after Isaac Newton. Although he published a circular diagram with segments for the primary colors that he had discovered (i.e., a color wheel), it is unlikely that he ever used a spinning disk to demonstrate the principles of light. He referred to the mixture of colors painted on a spinning top as "dirty" and described several experiments supporting his theory.

Transparent variations for magic lantern projection have been produced.

== History ==
Around 165 CE, Ptolemy described in his book Optics a rotating potter's wheel with different colors on it. He noted how the different colors of sectors mixed into one color and how dots appeared as circles when the wheel spun very fast. When lines are drawn across the disk's axis, the whole surface appears to be of a uniform color. "The visual impression that is created in the first revolution is invariably followed by repeated instances that subsequently produce an identical impression. This also happens in the case of shooting stars, whose light seems distended on account of their speed of motion, all according to the amount of perceptible distance it passes along with the sensible impression that arises in the visual faculty."

Porphyry (c. 243 – c. 305) wrote in his commentary on Ptolemy's Harmonics how the senses are not stable but confused and inaccurate. Certain intervals between repeated impressions are not detected. A white or black spot on a spinning cone (or top) appears as a circle of that color and a line on the top makes the whole surface appear in that color. "Because of the swiftness of the movement we receive the impression of the line on every part of the cone as the line moves."

In the 11th century Ibn al-Haytham, who was familiar with Ptolemy's writings, described how colored lines on a spinning top could not be discerned as different colors but appeared as one new color composed of all of the colors of the lines. He deduced that sight needs some time to discern a color. al-Haytam also noted that the top appeared motionless when spun extremely quickly "for none of its points remains fixed in the same spot for any perceptible time".

After Ibn al-Haytham, Fakhr al-Din al-Razi (d. 1209) performed the spinning disk experiment, and like his predecessors, he concluded that it showed an optical illusion. However, the astronomer-mathematician Nasir al-Din al-Tusi described al-Razi's text and arrived at a very different conclusion. Tusi introduced a common sense organ that forwards color impressions to the soul. When colors change too fast, this organ can only pass on the mixed colors. One of Tusi's students was Qutb al-Din al-Shirazi (d.1311), and together with his student Kamal al-Din al-Farisi, he tried to explain the colors perceived in the experiment.

=== Newton's primary colours ===
On 16 February 1672 (6 February 1671 [old style]), Newton sent a paper to the Royal Society's journal Philosophical Transactions, about the experiments he had been conducting since 1666 with the refraction of light through glass prisms. He concluded that the different refracted rays of light – well parted from others – could not be changed by further refraction, nor by reflection or other means, except through a mixture with other rays. He thus found the seven primary colors red, orange, yellow, green, blue, "a violet-purple" and indigo. When mixing the colored rays from prisms, he found that "the most surprising and wonderful composition was that of whiteness" requiring all the primary colors "mixed in a due proportion".

In reaction to Robert Hooke's criticism of the new theory of light, Newton published a letter in the Philosophical Transactions, with other experiments that proved how sunlight existed of rays with different colors. He described how the cogs or teeth of a gyrating wheel behind a prism can block part of the light so that all the colors would be projected successively if the wheel turns rather slow, but how all the colors will be mixed into white light if the wheel turns very fast. He also pointed out that rays of light that were reflected from multi-colored bodies were weakened by the loss of many rays and that a mixture of those rays would not produce a pure white, but a grey or "dirty" color. This could be seen in dust, which on close inspection would reveal that it consists of many colored particles, or when mixing several colors of paint. He also referred to a child's top which would display a "dirty" color if it was painted in several colors and made to spin fast by whipping it.

After presenting his conclusions about dividing sunlight into primary colors and mixing them back together into white light, Newton presented a color circle to illustrate the relations between these colors in his book Opticks (1704).

Many modern sources state that Isaac Newton himself used a spinning disk with colored sectors to demonstrate how white light was the compound of the primary colors. However, these do not reference any historical source.

According to Joseph Plateau, the first to describe how a spinning disk with Newton's seven primary colors would show an (imperfect) white color was Pieter van Musschenbroek in 1762.

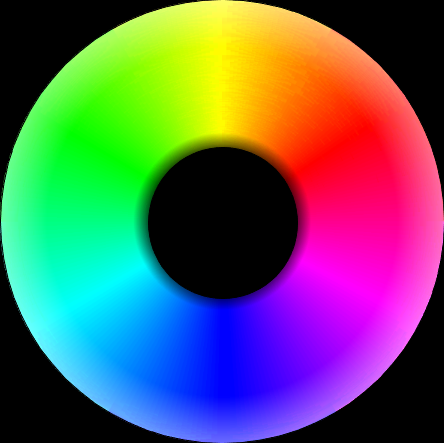

== See also ==
- Benham's top
