= Conyer =

Village in Kent, England

Coordinates: 51.347328°N 0.815595°E

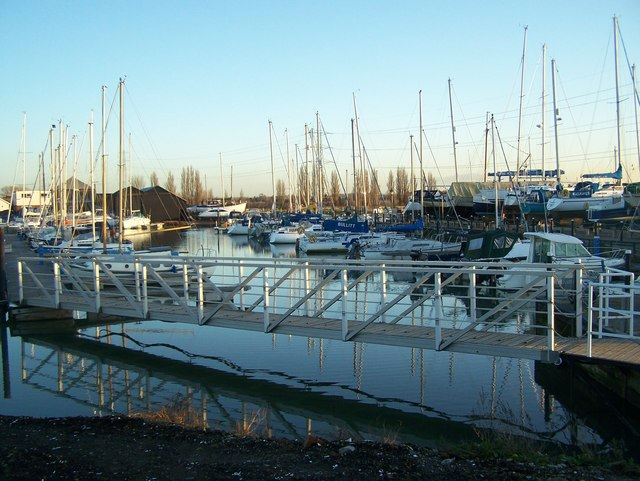
- Swale Marina, Conyer

- Location within Kent
- OS grid reference: TQ961646
- Civil parish: Teynham
- District: Swale
- Shire county: Kent
- Region: South East
- Country: England
- Sovereign state: United Kingdom
- Post town: SITTINGBOURNE
- Postcode district: ME9
- Dialling code: 01795
- Police: Kent
- Fire: Kent
- Ambulance: South East Coast
- UK Parliament: Sittingbourne and Sheppey

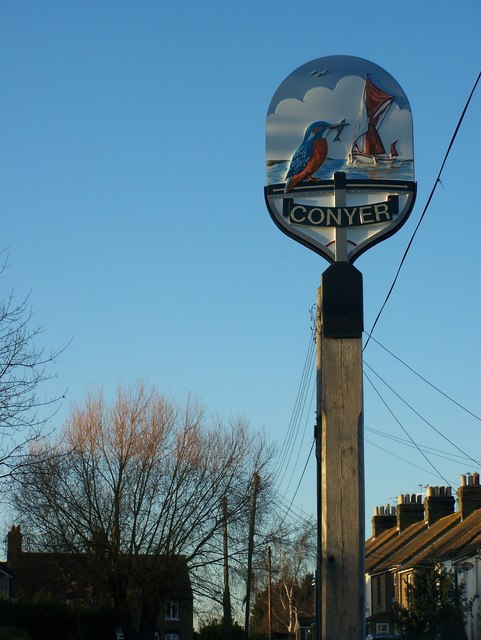
Conyer village sign, showing a kingfisher and a yacht

Conyer is a hamlet within Teynham civil parish in the borough of Swale in Kent, England. It is located around one mile north of the village of Teynham, and at the head of Conyer Creek, which flows into the Swale to the north. The Saxon Shore Way and National Cycle Route 1 pass through the hamlet.

Amenities in Conyer include a pub and a marina.

== History ==
Having been occupied since Roman times, the hamlet was frequently mentioned in early records, being described as Roman in nature, and often mentioned in relation to smuggling. It is said that a quarter of all the vessels engaged in smuggling nationwide were based in Kent and Sussex, with Conyer playing its part as a smuggling community in the 18th and 19th century.

== Brick making ==
During the Industrial Revolution, barges were used to move many raw materials and finished goods, which were produced in Kent, into the River Thames and on to London and beyond. Paper mills and brickfield in the local area, were fed by the barges that brought in sand, mud and household waste such as cinders for brick making, and took away the newly constructed bricks. The yellow stock bricks from Conyer were used to create the giant railway viaduct running from London Bridge to Greenwich. Conyer was ideally suited for this purpose (due its closeness to the Thames, via The Swale) and then a successful barge-building industry developed.

Conyer also provided much of the employment in the area after the 1920s with its brick works and cement factory. See Charles Richardson (cement merchant). In the mid-19th Century, Conyer had seven large-scale brickfields. This employed many hundreds of workers, who also then frequented the many new pubs in the area. Most of these have, since been closed and converted. Including the Brunswicks Arms in Conyer.

A small railway was built from the main London - Sittingbourne line to Conyer, to transfer materials to the brickfields. All traces of this line have been removed, after its use during World War II. Some of the line is now a footpath from Barrow Green, Teynham to Conyer.

The brickworks closed in the 1980s, the site since, has been cleared. Part of the site has a planning application for development (for 24 dwellings) after a lengthy planning application process. The rest of the site will be left as a Nature Reserve.

== Barge building ==
Conyer was a centre of the barge-building industry on the north coast, and boat building flourished in the area throughout the 19th century, with a total of around 500 barges being constructed in Conyer during the period.

In 1803, John Huggens built the earliest known barge was built in the area. John Bird (who was born 1832) is reputed to be the first of the barge builders to settle in Conyer. Records exist for a sailing barge built there in 1866, the year he began his work at the yard. The last of the many sailing barges was built at the Conyer yard in 1914, but repair works continued well into the 1930s, with several barge yachts built in the 1920s. Alfred Marconi (who took over John Bird's yard) built many different types of barge. Some continued to exist as house barges, well into the 1960s.

The marina near the local pub/restaurant is still popular.

== Other notes ==
Conyer and the surrounding area (mostly farms) is popular with walkers, either following the Saxon Shore Way along the Swale, or with various footpath links to Sittingbourne and Faversham.
