= Will (Thames barge) =

Thames sailing barge

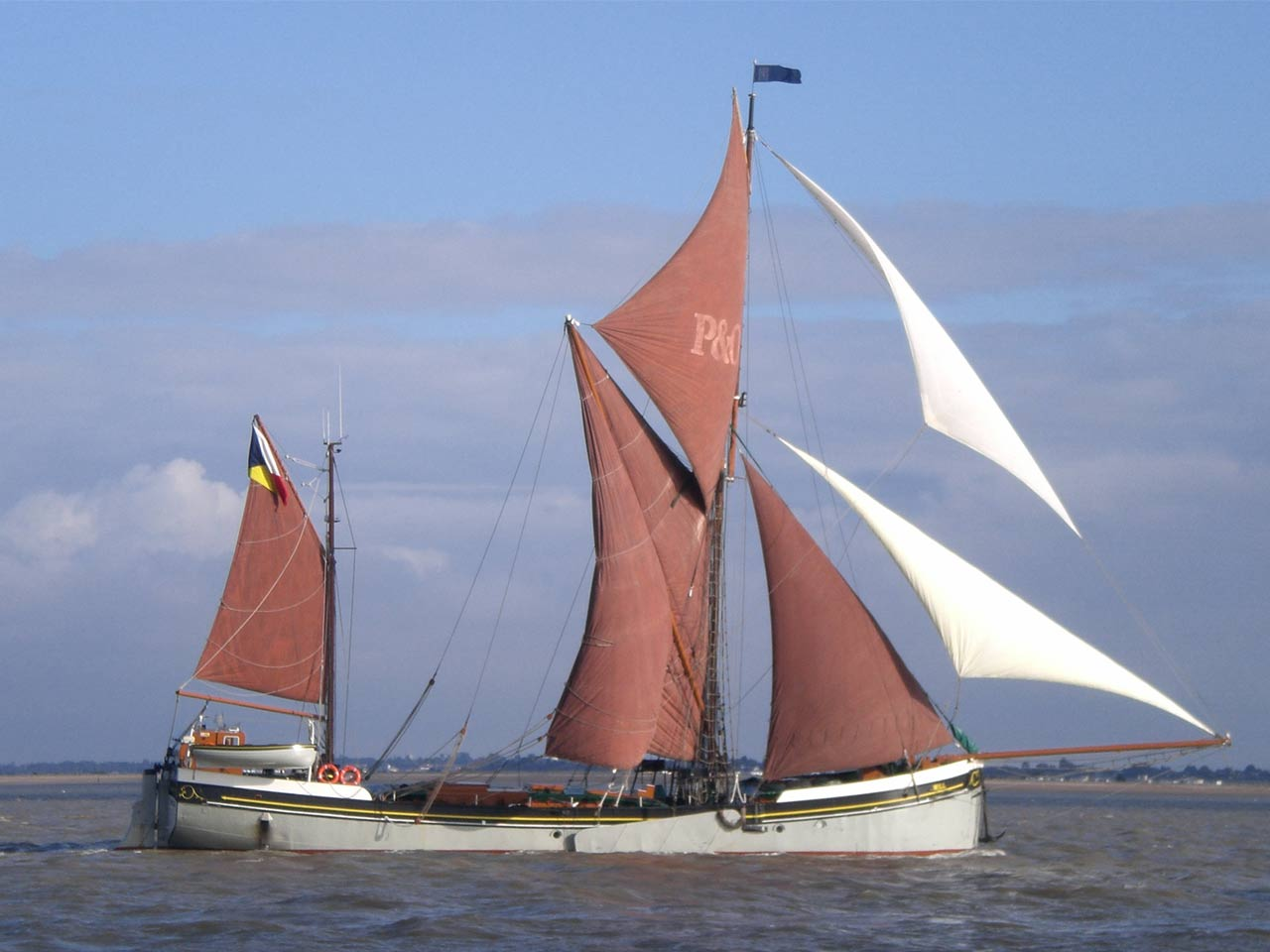
- Thames sailing barge Will

History

United Kingdom
- Name: Will Everard (1925-66); Will (since 1966)
- Port of registry: London, United Kingdom.
- Builder: Fellows & Co, Great Yarmouth
- Launched: 1925
- Identification: IMO number: 5389841; MMSI number: 235000922; Callsign: MBSF

General characteristics
- Class & type: Thames sailing barge
- Tonnage: 187.59 (gross); 128.92 (registered)
- Length: 97.6 ft (29.75 m) overall
- Beam: 23.1 ft (7.04 m)
- Draught: 6 ft (1.83 m)
- Depth: 9.6 ft (2.93 m)
- Propulsion: Sail and auxiliary diesel engine
- Sail plan: Mainsail, topsail, mizzen, foresail, jib, flying jib)
- Complement: 3 or 4
- Notes: Website:

Will is a Thames sailing barge, built in Great Yarmouth by Fellows & Co in 1925. She is 97.6 ft (29.75 m) long, 23.1 ft (7.04 m) across and 9.6 ft (2.93 m) deep. Will Everard, as she was originally known, was commissioned as one of four steel barges; the largest ever built. She is a mulie, with a spritsail rigged mainmast, a topmast and a gaff-rigged mizzen. She has a flat bottom with leeboards as is customary for Thames sailing barges. As one of the last sailing cargo vessels to operate in UK waters she left trade in 1966. After a few years lying derelict, she was refitted and eventually entered into the service of P&O (Peninsular and Oriental Steam Navigation Company) where she was used as a floating board room until 1999. This role in corporate hospitality continued and she now is fully engaged in private charter work. She currently operates out of the Pool of London from a base at Hermitage Community Moorings, Reeds Wharf and St Katharine Docks for cruises through London, the east coast and beyond.

== Early life as an Everard barge ==
Will Everard, as she was originally known, was commissioned by F.T. Everard in 1925 as one of four steel-hulled sister ships. The vessels were to be the largest Thames sailing barges ever built and were coasters destined for ports up to Newcastle in the north-east and round to Poole in the southwest. The Barges were built to Mr F.T. Everard's exact specifications and named after four family members: Will, Ethel, Fred and Alf. According to long term skipper, Jim Uglow MBE, "four stouter built barges never put to sea."

Will Everard was finished in 1925 and worked for the firm for over 40 years. She was initially bound to a coal contract supplying the gasworks at Margate with coal from Keadby on the Humber but routinely fitted in other cargoes between voyages. She was designed to be sailed by a Master, a Mate and two boys, however, her large size meant in practice a man at Third Hand proved more capable than two boys. In the 1930s she parted cables while sitting though a storm off Eastbourne and was blown ashore and battered on the beach for hours before the storm passed. She was found buried in the shingle, damaged but intact (her bottom survived this damage for decades before it was finally replaced in 2006). She was towed out by horse and the rig was repaired within days.

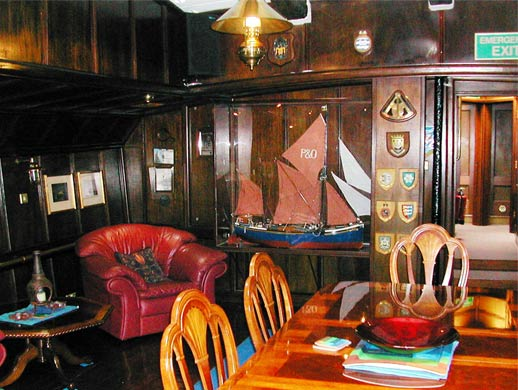
P&O converted Will's cargo hold into a mahogany-panelled saloon

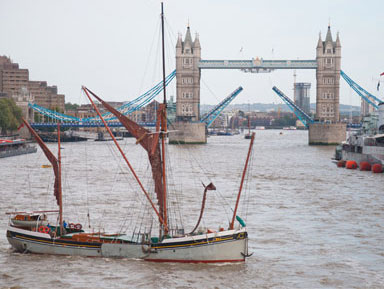
Will in the Upper Pool of London with Tower Bridge

== World War II ==
Will Everard was due to participate in the Dunkirk evacuation, but her cargo was not unloaded in time. Her sister ship, Ethel Everard was lost on the beaches and left aground. Will Everard continued her trade work throughout the war. She completed 147 coasting voyages and carried, in total, 38,345 tons of cargo that included grain, sugar beet, oil cake, fertilisers, flour, sugar and cement.

In 1940, she was machine gunned twice in the River Medina and bombed in a daylight raid at Phoenix Wharf by the Luftwaffe. In the same year another Thames sailing barge, Britisher, was destroyed by depth charges only 300 yards away. In 1942 she was very nearly torpedoed off Harwich by a German motor torpedo boat and in the following year she was attacked by a Focke-Wulf that shot 1,000 holes through her mainsail. However, none of her crew were injured and by this point her wheelhouse had been reinforced with steel to withstand aircraft mounted machine guns. Jim Uglow was awarded an MBE for his work becoming the only Barge Master to be honoured with such an achievement in this line of work.

== A new life for an old barge? ==
Will Everard continued to trade after the war and was for a while the largest barge to remain trading under sail. However, the fleets were smaller and the sail trade was changing. An auxiliary engine was fitted in 1950 but the cost of running the barges was going up, many of the crews sought work elsewhere and shipping was changing with the introduction of containerization and a growing road network.

She was sold out of trade in 1966 to Vernon Harvey for £750 and was renamed Will. She lay as storage for a few years before being bought by a barge enthusiast, John Hobbins, who re-rigged her. In 1976 she was sold to Overseas Containers Ltd (OCL) where she had a major refit in Maldon and began her new life in corporate hospitality.

In 1986, P&O (Peninsular and Oriental Steam Navigation Company) shipping gained control of OCL and therefore Will as well. They painted her hull in P&O blue and they began using her as a floating boardroom and dining room for entertaining. With her cargo hold now a mahogany panelled saloon, her conversion was complete. This new role of transporting and entertaining people continues to this day. In many ways this reflects the growing service sector in the wake of manufacturing decline in the latter 20th century and beyond. The P&O insignia is still visible on her mainsail to this day.

Her skipper of 17 years, Sue Harrison, bought her in 1999 before she was sold to Mark Tower and Topsail Events in 2004 to continue work in corporate hospitality. Her hull has had many colours, notably green under OCL and dark blue under P&O, however, she was recently repainted in 2006 by the current owner into her original grey hull with gold sheer line. Between 2018 and early 2020, she operated out of the Pool of London by a charter company called Thames Leisure. In 2020 she was bought outright by another owner and operates as Thames Barge Will. She is moored at the heart of Canary Wharf in the West India Docks where she cruises through London, the east coast and beyond.

In 1996, Will was made a part of the National Historic Ships fleet in the UK as vessel number 234 showing her continuing importance for national maritime heritage.

== See also ==
Thalatta (Thames barge)
