= Thalatta (Thames barge) =

Thames sailing barge

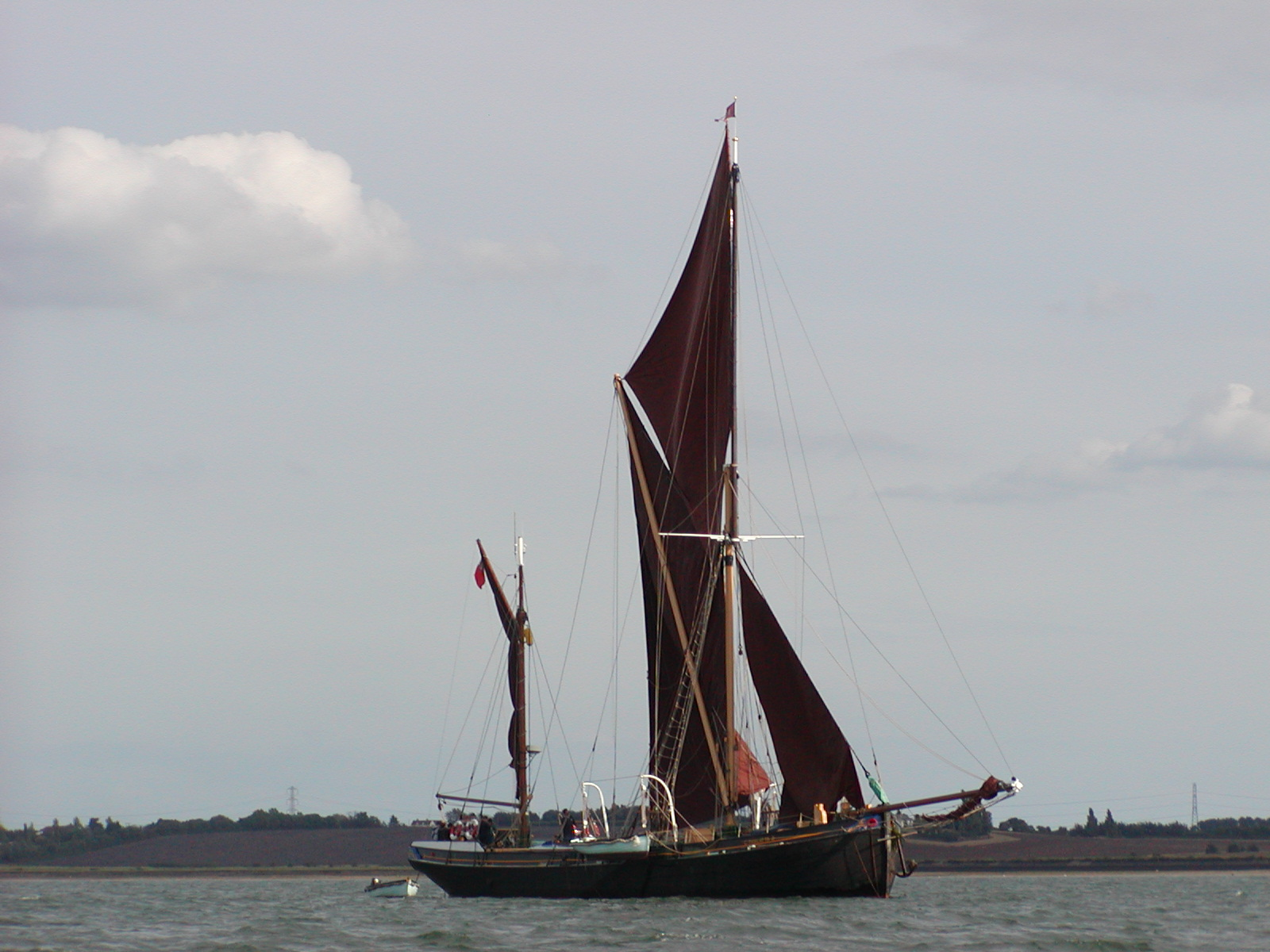
- Thames sailing barge Thalatta

History

United Kingdom
- Name: Thalatta
- Builder: McLearon, Harwich, Essex, UK
- Launched: 1906
- Status: Sailing as of 2020

General characteristics
- Class & type: Thames sailing barge
- Tons burthen: 67
- Length: 88.9 ft (27.1 m)
- Beam: 20.6 ft (6.3 m)
- Draught: 2 ft (0.61 m)approx
- Depth of hold: 6 ft (1.8 m)approx
- Propulsion: Sail and auxiliary diesel engine
- Sail plan: mainsail, topsail, mizzen, foresail, jib
- Complement: 2

Thalatta is a Thames sailing barge, built in Harwich, Essex, in 1906 and rebuilt in St Osyth in 2012. She is 90 feet (27 m) long and 26 feet (7.9 m) across the widest part of the deck. Like all Thames barges, she is flat-bottomed and has leeboards instead of a keel. She spent some of her life ketch-rigged and some of it spritsail-rigged. She is now permanently spritsail rigged, and has a mainmast and topmast that, together, are about 90 feet (27 m) high, and a mizzen mast. Thalatta has had two periods with an auxiliary engine and two without. She carried cargo for sixty years and was then converted for use as a sail training ship in 1966. She was completely rebuilt between 2006 and 2012 at St Osyth with assistance from lottery funds.

== History ==
Thalatta was built by McLearon's shipyard in Harwich. She was bought from McLearon's by Fred Horlock of Mistley, who gave her a spritsail rig suitable for sailing in the smooth waters of the Thames estuary. She was registered on 6 February 1906 and her first skipper was James Alliston of Mistley.

Thalatta's first freight was from London to Lowestoft, and from there they went to Hull and then back to Mistley. On 24 March, they sailed to Ipswich to load beans for Nieuwpoort in Belgium and there they loaded a cargo for Antwerp. During that first year of trading, Thalatta visited Hull again and also Dunkirk and Rotterdam.

The spritsail rig isn't a good rig for the rough waters of the North Sea, and at some point, early in her life, Thalatta was re-rigged as a ketch, with a boom and gaff mainsail

Between 1908 and 1914 the barge made frequent passages to the north of England, to Newcastle and Sunderland, and west to Appledore in North Devon, as well as Dublin, Wicklow, and Wexford in Ireland with malt from Mistley and Ipswich. She also visited many ports on the European mainland.

On 10 November 1908, she was caught in a severe storm between Sunderland and the Thames and, three days later, was towed into Lowestoft with a broken main gaff and a split sail. A couple of months later, on 15 January 1909, under way in the Thames's Blackwall reach, and loaded with maize, Thalatta was in collision with a steamer, which did considerable damage to her starboard side. Such a collision was not an unusual occurrence in the Thames at that time.

In 1915, the first world war brought a change in Thalatta's use and she was put to work as a lighter in the Thames for a year. The following year, she ran between Shoreham and Dieppe, loaded with pig iron to feed the French war machine.

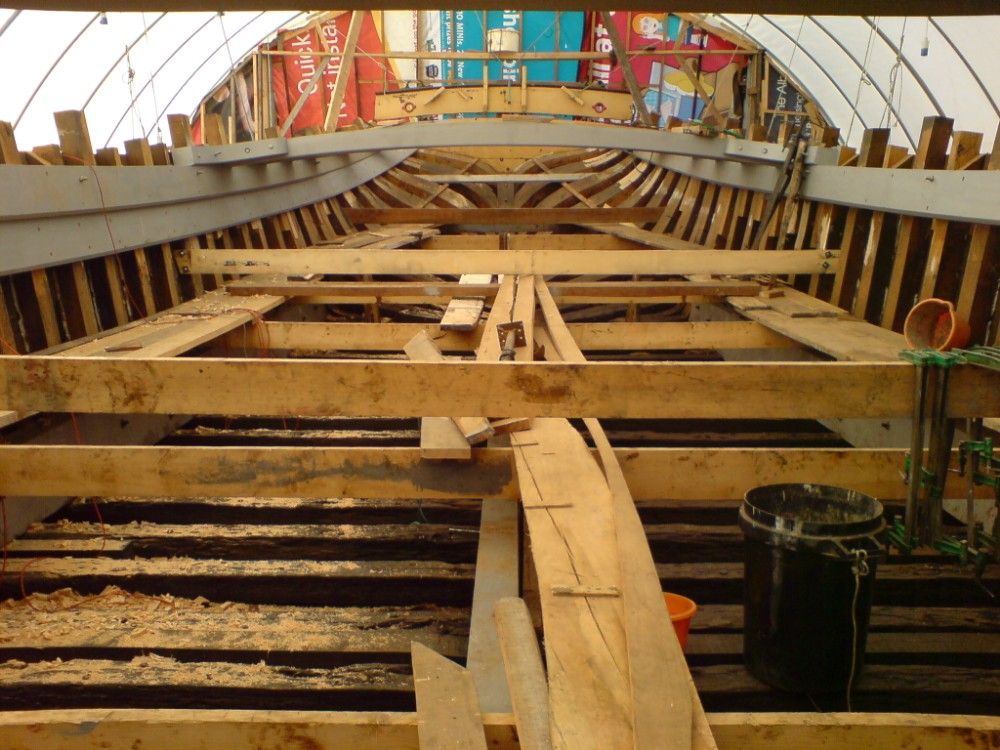
The Thalatta being rebuilt

In 1917 the barge was bought by the Wynnfield Shipping Company of Grimsby, who installed a 70 hp (52 kW) two-cycle vertical oil engine, built by Plenty & Sons of Newbury. She was used as a supply vessel to the Humber boom defences skippered by Percy Richmond (who had previously been mate).

At the end of the war, Herbert John Body of Southend took over as skipper and Thalatta had a regular run into war-torn Flanders with materials for postwar rebuilding. Between 1919 and 1921 she also went to Paris, Antwerp, Brussels, and Rotterdam.

After that, she carried cement to Torquay, china clay from Fowey to Greenhithe, and granite chippings from the Channel Islands.

Then in 1923, she was sold to Captain Body and, for reasons now long forgotten, her engine was taken out. She was converted back to a spritsail rig and continued carrying cargoes between the north of England and the Channel, as well as to mainland Europe.

After ten years, Body sold her to maltsters R. & W. Paul Ltd. of Ipswich and her cargoes then were malt and occasionally flour to London, barley or wheat to Ipswich, animal feed to Colchester and Faversham, and occasional runs across the North Sea. Her skipper was Bob Ruffles and, after him, there were Lucas, Wells, and Webb. Pauls looked after the barge well and she was found to be unusually sound and well-preserved when her last Board of Trade loadline inspection was carried out in 1964.

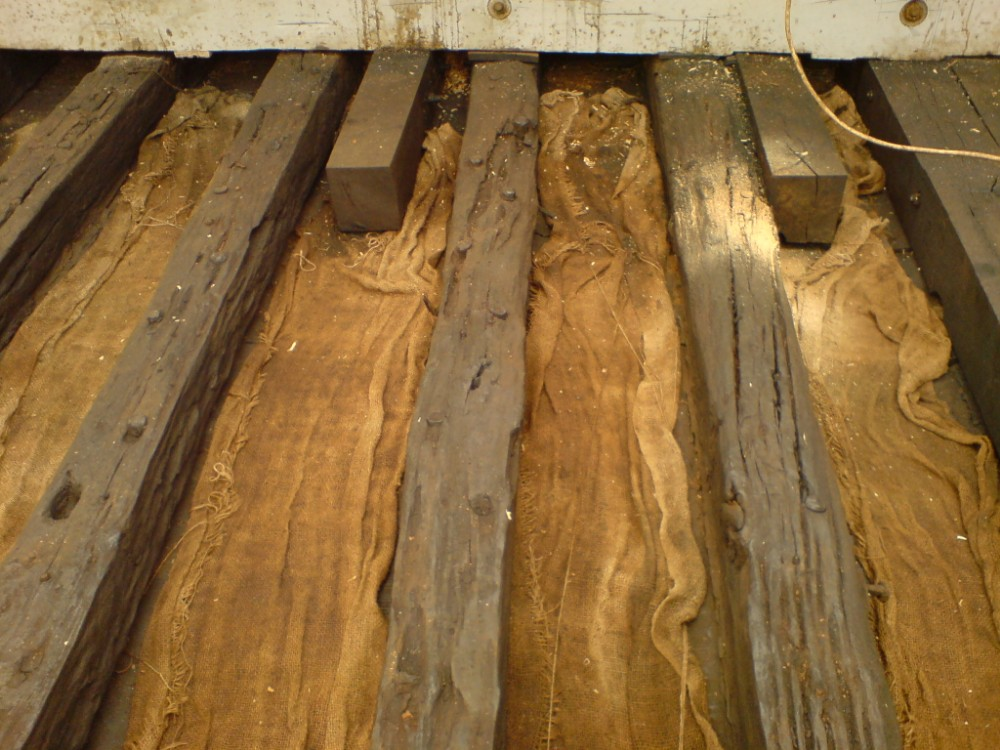
These timbers are some of Thalatta's original floors.

After the second world war, her skipper, Joe Lucas, sailed her to Lowestoft where she was again fitted with an auxiliary engine - a war surplus Ruston and Hornsby marine diesel - at Richards' yard.

In 1966 Thalatta was sold to John Kemp of Maldon who converted her for use as a school ship. She was then re-rigged, using some items from another damaged barge 'Memory'.

She was contracted to take school children from the London Borough of Redbridge sailing for five day trips between April and October.

The barge was later taken over by the East Coast Sail Trust and continued to work as a schoolship skippered by John Kemp with Jane Benham as the mate. John Kemp died at the wheel in September 1987, near Mersea Island in the Blackwater estuary.

In 2005, the Trust had to repair the hull, as the hull and structure were in danger of rotting away.

In 2006, the East Coast Sail Trust received a grant of £527,500 from the Heritage Lottery Fund for the restoration of Thalatta. In March, skipper Gary Diddams and mate Roger Davies sailed to the St Osyth boatyard for refurbishment. The original intention was to just replace the outer planking and the worst of the frames, but it became apparent that most of the frames were rotted beyond repair and only the floors (the bottom sections of the frame) and the relatively new transom were fit to be retained. It was decided that the old barge should be rebuilt and East Coast Sail Trust began to raise funds to carry out this very expensive job. Using Heritage funding, they completed the repairs in 2009. Then in August 2011, they re-launched the barge.

The rebuilding process was completed in 2012 and Thalatta was able to resume her work as a sail training ship that year.

== Name ==
The name Thalatta is the anglicized version of the Greek word θάλαττα, meaning "the sea". A yacht named Thalassa was built in Cowes in the same year as the Thalatta, 1906. Thalassa (θάλασσα) is an alternative form of the same Greek word. A possible explanation of this apparent case of synchronicity is the fact that Mrs Baillie Reynolds published a highly popular novel named Thalassa in the same year.

It seems unlikely that the conjunction of these three events is pure chance, although clear evidence of a link between them remains to be found. To Quote Thalatta's "Autobiography" - "Thalatta Spirit of the sea" pub Phillips Design

"Why name the barge Thalatta? Here we delve into Greek mythology where Thalassa personified the primeval spirit of the sea. Mating with her male counterpart Pontos, she gave birth to the tribes of fish. Although not generally given human form, Thalassa appears in the fables of Aesop as a woman formed of sea water rising out of the ocean.

Roman mosaics also depict her as a woman rising from the sea, with crab-claw like horns, clothed in seaweed and holding a ship's oar. Now generally used to mean “The sea” Thalassa represents the word in the Ionian form of Greek, the classical version of the language, the one in which the early Christian Gospels would have been written. In the earlier Attic or Athenian form of the language the word would be spelt Thalatta. Attic began to give way generally to Ionian following the writing reforms carried out in Athens in 403 BC. How McLearon’s came to name their barge Thalatta is another story. The most likely explanation is that the square rigged ship Thalatta of Liverpool had been lying in the Harwich harbour for some time and that this had inspired the naming. Given the version of the spelling used this seems very likely though the use of classical references was common in the naming of barges at this time."

== Schoolship ==
In 1966 Thalatta was entirely restored and re-rigged to take on a role as a schoolship under the flag of the East Coast Sail Trust. The barge's former cargo space was converted into communal living quarters where young people sleep in hammocks and keep their belongings in big wooden sea chests.

Over forty years, thousands of kids have benefited from their experience of living and working as crew aboard the barge. During the five-day voyages, the young people assist with the working of the ship, taking turns with cooking and cleaning, as well as winding up the anchor, setting the heavy red sails, and taking a turn at the wheel.

The ship carries two large ship's boats, each able to carry eight passengers. These can be rowed or propelled by outboard motors and are used to explore coastal inlets and creeks which are too shallow for the barge to navigate.

Thalatta's educational cruises offer the opportunity for a varied programme of environmental studies and give a glimpse into the vanished age of working timber sailing ships. They combine adventure with formal learning, covering such topics as estuary ecology, pollution, fisheries, waterside communities, sea defences, and rescue services.

== See also ==
- Ena
- Will (Thames barge)
- John Arthur Kemp
- Jane Benham
