= Fechner color effect =

Illusion of color

A sample of a Benham's top (animated version)

Movie

The Fechner color effect is an illusion of color seen when looking at certain rapidly changing or moving black-and-white patterns. They are also called pattern induced flicker colors (PIFCs).

The effect is most commonly demonstrated with a device known as Benham's top (also called Benham's disk). When the top is spun, arcs of pale color are visible at different places on the disk that forms its upper surface. The effect can also be seen in stroboscopic lights when flashes are set at certain critical speeds. Rotating fan blades, particularly aluminum ones, can also demonstrate the effect; as the fan accelerates or decelerates, the colors appear, drift, change and disappear. The stable running speed of the fan does not (normally) produce colors, suggesting that it is not an interference effect with the frequency of the illumination flicker.

The effect was noted by Gustav Fechner and Hermann von Helmholtz and propagated to English-speakers through Charles Benham's invention of his top. Florence Winger Bagley was one of the early investigators of this phenomenon.

The phenomenon originates from neural activity in the retina and spatial interactions in the primary visual cortex, which plays a role in encoding low-level image features, such as edges and spatiotemporal frequency components. Research indicates that the blue–yellow opponent process accounts for all the different PIFCs.

Research has been done into the use of Benham's top and other PIFCs as diagnostic tools for diseases of the eye and the visual track. It has shown particular promise in detecting optic neuritis.

== Benham's top ==
Benham's top is named after the English newspaper-man, amateur scientist, and toymaker Charles Benham, who in 1895 sold a top painted with the pattern shown. Benham was inspired to propagate the Fechner color effect through his top after his correspondence with Gustav Theodor Fechner, who had observed and demonstrated the said effect. Benham's top made it possible for speakers of the English language to learn of the Fechner color effect, about which Fechner's original reports were written in German.

== See also ==
- Newton disc
