= Essex County Standard =

Local newspaper in Colchester, England

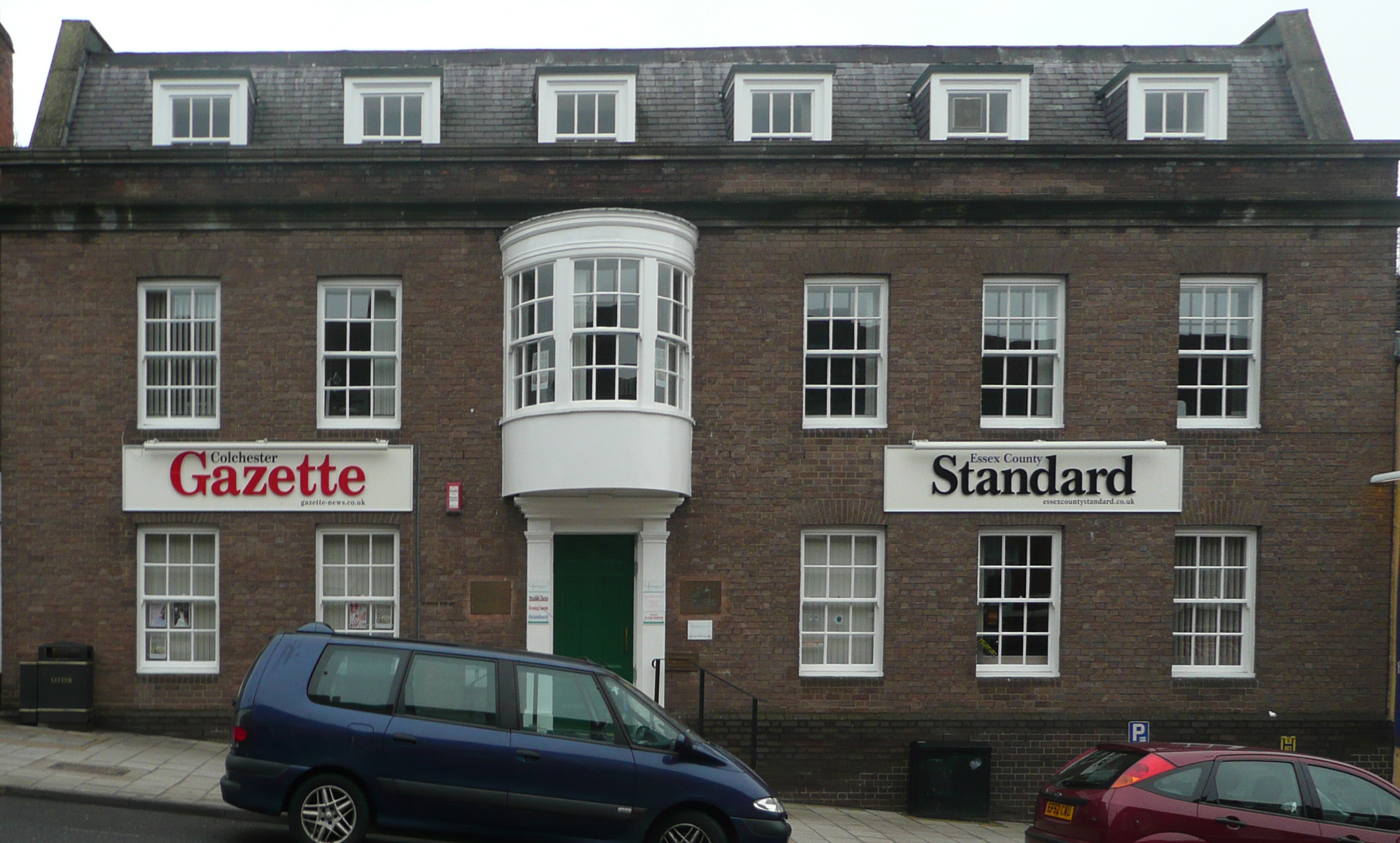
- The paper's now closed offices on North Hill, Colchester, in January 2010
- Type: Weekly newspaper
- Format: Tabloid
- Owner: Newsquest Media Group
- Editor: James Wills
- Founded: 1831
- Headquarters: Severalls Industrial Estate, Colchester
- Circulation: 4,590 (as of 2023)
- Sister newspapers: Colchester Evening Gazette
- Website: essexcountystandard.co.uk

The Essex County Standard is a weekly newspaper, published in Colchester, Essex. It is currently owned by the Newsquest Media Group, part of the American Gannett Company.

== History ==
The Essex County Standard was founded in January 1831, then called the Essex Standard. It was to be a weekly Tory paper and "a Standard around which the loyal, the religious, and the well-affected of our County may rally". Originally printed in Chelmsford, it was acquired by a John Taylor in September 1831, who moved it to new premises in Colchester. The paper was sold to Edward Benham, T. Ralling, and Henry B. Harrison in 1866 though Ralling soon relinquished his interest. The paper was enlarged to eight pages in 1873.

Managers of the paper dropped the price to 1d (half a new pence) in 1891, causing a jump in circulation and in 1892, changed the title to Essex County Standard. A series of changes in editor saw control of the paper ultimately fall into the hands of the Benham family: first Edward, then his wife Mary; next their sons William and Charles; and finally William's son Hervey. In 1964 the paper, then printed by web-offset lithography (a process pioneered by the Benhams and fellow newspaper proprietor Arnold Quick), was described by Printing World (a trade paper) as Britain's best produced weekly newspaper. Benham Newspapers Ltd. merged with Quick's Clacton based publishing company in 1970 to form Essex County Newspapers Ltd.
