= Hervey Benham =

British newspaper editor

Hervey William Gurney Benham (/ˈbɛnəm/; 1910–1987) was an English journalist, the founding proprietor of Essex County Newspapers, an author of books on Essex and the East Coast, a musician, and benefactor. Of his at least fourteen books, among the best known are Down Tops'l, Last Stronghold of Sail and Once Upon a Tide.

== Biography ==
Hervey Benham was the son of William Gurney Benham (three-times Mayor of Colchester and editor of the Essex County Standard from 1884 to 1943) and Ethel Hervey Elwes. He succeeded his father as editor of the Essex County Standard from 1943 to 1965. In 1964 he commenced production of the paper using web-offset lithography a revolutionary printing process that he had pioneered with fellow newspaper proprietor Arnold Quick in Colchester, Essex. The Standard was described by the trade paper Printing World as Britain's best produced weekly newspaper.

His daughter, Jane Benham, played a significant role in the maritime educational East Coast Sail Trust, in which Hervey was also involved, and in the preservation of Thames sailing barges.

== Publications ==
Books written by Hervey Benham include:

- The Last Stronghold of Sail. London: Harrap. 1947. ISBN 0-245-53784-8.
- Down Tops'l. London: Harrap. 1951. ISBN 0-245-54487-9.
- Once Upon a Tide. Harrap. 1955.
- Two Cheers for the Town Hall. Hutchinson. 1964.
- Some Essex Water Mills. Colchester: Essex County Newspapers Ltd. 1976. ISBN 0-9508919-0-8.
- The Stowboaters. Colchester: Essex County Newspapers Ltd. 1977.
- The Codbangers. Colchester: Essex County Newspapers Ltd. 1979.
- The Salvagers. Colchester: Essex County Newspapers Ltd. 1980. ISBN 0-9509442-3-8.
