= William Gurney Benham =

British newspaper editor and published author

Sir William Gurney Benham FRHS FSA
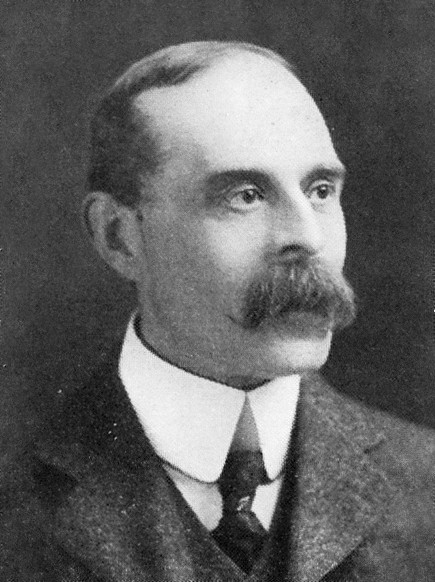
- Gurney Benham c. 1916
- Born: 16 February 1859; Colchester, Essex, England
- Died: 13 May 1944 (aged 85); Colchester, Essex, England
- Children: Hervey Benham

Sir William Gurney Benham, FSA, FRHS (/ˈbɛnəm/; 16 February 1859 – 13 May 1944) was a British newspaper editor, published author and three times Mayor of Colchester.

== Early life and family ==
William Benham was born on 16 February 1859 to Edward Benham, a printer, and Mary Carr. He was educated at the Merchant Taylors' School until 1873 and then at Colchester Royal Grammar School, a school about which he has written, of whose old boys' society he was later President and which still has a building named after him.

== Career ==
Benham's first job was as a journalist in Wiltshire in 1881. In 1884 he took over the family printing business and began his 59-year editorship of the Essex County Standard. From 1892 to 1929 he edited the newspaper jointly with his brother, Charles Edwin Benham.

In addition, Gurney Benham was mayor of Colchester three times, for the years 1892/93, 1908/09 and 1933/34, in 1933 was appointed to the honour of High Steward of Colchester and was knighted in 1935 in recognition of his public service. He remained editor of the Standard until 1943, and was a director of the Colchester Gas Company for over forty years, being chairman until his resignation on grounds of ill health the day before his death.

== Death and legacy ==
Benham died on 13 May 1944.

Gurney Benham Close, a street in Colchester, and Gurney Benham House, a building on the Colchester Royal Grammar School campus, are named after him.

== Publications ==
A "conscientious as well as an excellent scholar", he is now mainly known through his many publications, many of which are transcriptions of official documents from mediaeval times, particularly those related to his home town of Colchester. He also compiled a number of books of quotations, leading a reviewer in the Journal of Education to comment after his death, "it is remarkable that one man — Sir William Gurney Benham — was able to collect and arrange some fifty thousand quotations and proverbs". For ten years he was also editor of the Essex Review.

- Playing Cards: The History and Secrets of the Pack
- Book of Quotations, Proverbs and Household Words (1924, reprinted 1929)
- Dictionary of Quotations. 1948 [1907].
- Prose quotations: classified under prose-headings, and fully indexed. London: Cassell. 1926.
- A Short History of Playing Cards
- Benham's New Book of Quotations. 1988
- The oath book; or, Red parchment book of Colchester

== Family ==
In 1880 Benham married, firstly, Maria Louisa Quilter, and they had four children: Cecil Edward Gurney Benham (1881–1929), Violet Inez Benham (1882–1968), Gerald Carr Benham (1883–1962) and Charles Benham (1884–1945). In 1904 he married, secondly, Ethel Hervey Elwes, sister of H. Geoffrey Elwes. The couple had three children: Edith Tayspill Benham (1905–1955), Hervey William Gurney Benham (1910–1987) and Maura Elwes Mary Benham (1912–1995).
