= Thames sailing barge =

Type of commercial sailing boat

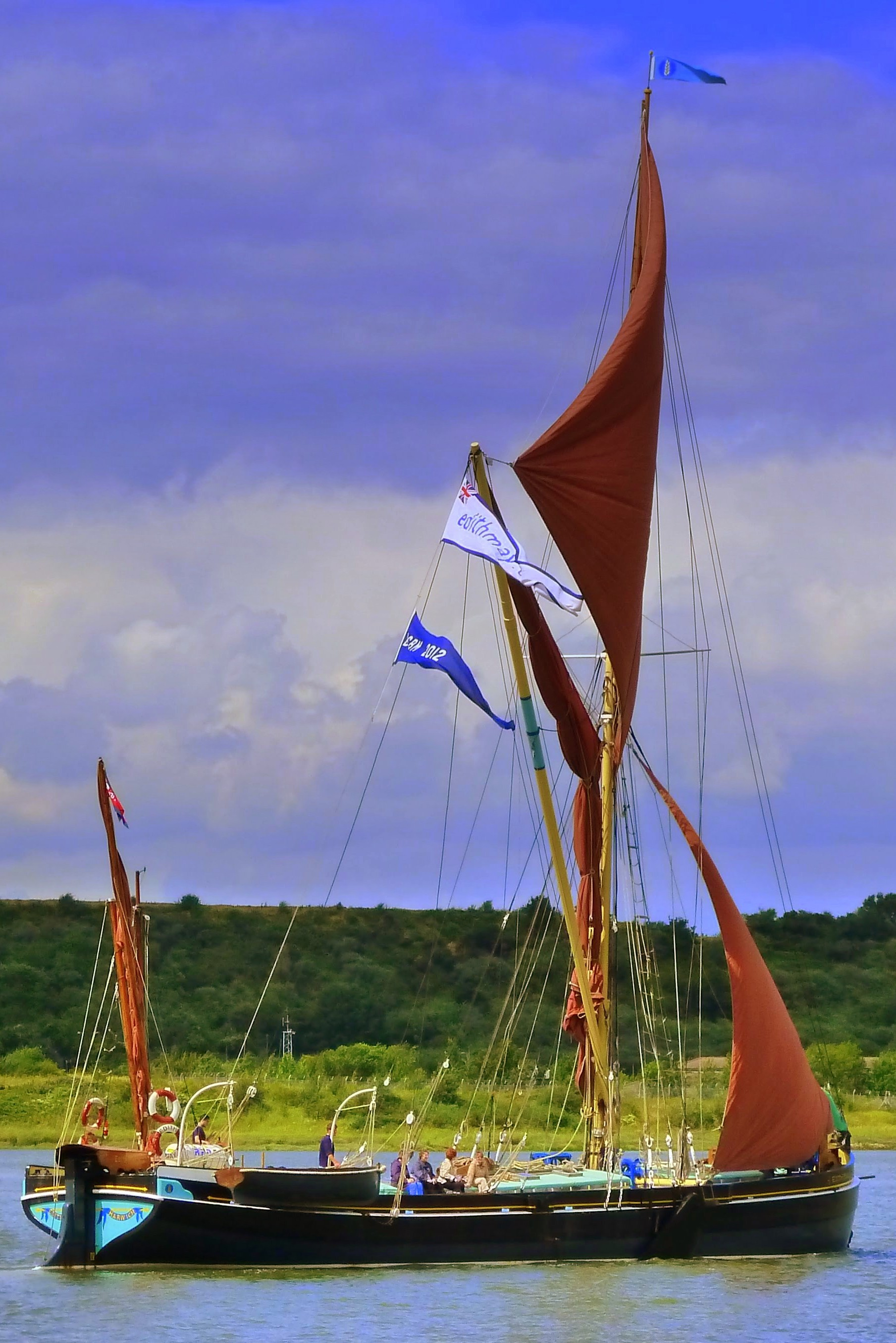
Thames barge, Edith May, sailing on topsail and foresail on the River Medway

A Thames sailing barge is a type of commercial sailing boat once common on the River Thames, and nearby coastline and estuaries. The flat-bottomed barges, with a shallow draught and leeboards, were perfectly adapted to these often shallow waters

The barges only needed a small crew, typically two men and a dog. The average size was about 120 tons and they carried around 4,200 square feet (390 m^{2}) of canvas sail in six working sails. The sail's characteristic maroon colour derives from the mix of materials used to treat the flax to protect it from ultra-violet weathering.

The barges were of various types; river barges worked the Thames and the Port of London. Cut barges were smaller so they could pass into the Regent's and Surrey canals. The larger estuary barges were seaworthy craft working the Kent and Essex coasts while coasters also traded much further afield, to the north of England, the South Coast, the Bristol Channel and to continental European ports.

Cargoes varied enormously: bricks, cement, hay, rubbish, sand, coal, grain and gunpowder. Timber, bricks and hay were stacked on the deck, while cement and grain was carried loose in the hold. They could sail low in the water, even with their gunwales beneath the surface.

They sailed the Thames and surrounding waters for two hundred years; then in the 1860s a series of barge races were started, and the barges' design improved as vessels were built with better lines in order to win. The Thames barge races are the world's second oldest sailing competition, second to the America's Cup.

== Build and rigging ==
The vast majority of barges were wooden hulled (although a significant number of later barges were also built in steel), between 80 and 90 ft (24 and 27 m) long with a beam of around 20 ft (6.1 m). The hull form was as distinctive as their rig, being flat-bottomed with no external keel. There is a degree of flare to the sides and plumb ends. The stern was a transom, shaped like a section through a champagne glass, on which was hung a large rudder. The hull was mainly a hold with two small living areas in the bow and stern, and access was through two large hatchways, the smaller before the main mast and a much larger aperture behind. To prevent her unwanted (sideways) passage to the lee, are two massive pivoted leeboards.

The topsail was usually first sail on and last sail off, being fixed to the topmast by hoops. In the upper reaches of the rivers and constricted harbours it reached into the clear air, and when approaching a berth casting off the halliard would drop it immediately killing the forward drive. The mizzen boom in a mulie is sheeted down to the long shallow rudder. The masts are mounted in tabernacles so they can be lowered to pass under bridges; the anchor windlass is used to lower and raise the gear via triple blocks. This takes considerable effort and to aid in the process 'hufflers' were often used. They would come on board to help with lowering and raising the gear (for a fee). The bowsprit where fitted could be 'topped', helping where space was limited.

Sails on a Thames barge

They were usually spritsail rigged on two masts. Most had a topsail above the huge mainsail and a large foresail. The mizzen was a much smaller mast on which was set a single sail whose main purpose was to aid steering when tacking. The rig also allowed a relatively large sail area on the upper part of the mast, to catch wind when moored ships, buildings or trees blocked wind on the water's surface. The topsail could remain set even when the mainsail had been brailed to the mast. Sail areas varied from 3,000–5,600 square feet (280–520 m^{2}) depending on the size of the barge. The typical, rusty-red maroon colour of the flax sails was due to the dressing used to treat the sails that were permanently aloft (traditionally made from red ochre, cod oil, urine and seawater). The red ochre was there to block the ultra-violet in the sunlight from degrading the sails (much as lamp-black was used in the sail dressing for the Norfolk wherries), but sails that were stowed away such as jibsails were usually left untreated. The barges required no ballast, and sailing in this condition with leeboards raised they typically draw only 3 foot; this has caught out a few modern yachtsmen who have run aground while attempting to follow them. No auxiliary power was used originally but many barges were fitted with engines in later years and most retain them, but among the surviving sailing barges both Mirosa and Edme have never had engines.

The mainsail was loose-footed and set up with a sprit, and was brailed to the mast when not needed. It is sheeted to a horse, as is the foresail; they require no attention when tacking. The foresail is often held back by the mate to help the vessel come about more swiftly.

The mast was mounted in a mast case, or "tabernacle", at deck level and could be dropped and raised while under way, enabled the barge to "shoot bridges"-pass under bridges, on the Thames and Medway without losing headway. When no wharf was available, the barge could use the ebbing tide to stand on the mud, close to shore and offload its goods onto carts. A barge with no topsail – or top mast sailing stumpy-rigged required a smaller crew. With a shallow draught, they could penetrate deep into the back waters. Not needing ballast reduced their turn-round time. Where fitted, the bowsprit could also be "topped up" - raised, to allow it to use a shorter wharf.

In good conditions, sailing barges could attain speeds of over 12 knots (22 km/h; 14 mph), and their leeboards enabled them to be highly effective windward performers. The unusual spritsail rig allowed any combination of sails to be set: often the topsail on its own would be effective.

== Crew ==
An advantage of Thames barges was their small crew. The typical crew was two men and a dog, the dog being useful for security and catching rats as well as for companionship. Occasionally barges would be crewed by just one man and a dog. Some larger barges would add a boy, or a woman (usually the wife of the skipper) to the crew.

== History ==
The precursor to the square spritsail barge was the London lighter or dumb-barge. They flitted up and down the river delivering cargo, using the incoming tide to send them up river, and the ebbing tide for the return journey. They were manoeuvered by a pair of bargemen using long sweeps (oars). These barges had a flat box like bow (swim-headed) and a near flat stern, or a square sloping stern (budgett stern). There is a print in the Guildhall Library dating from 1764, showing a 1697 built, round bowed barge with a spritsail rig – but with no mizzen.

The spritsail and the leeboards are both of Dutch origin and can be traced back to 1416 and can be seen on the London River by 1600.

Mizzenless barges, known as luff barges, were smaller and more streamlined: they principally worked the upper reaches of the Thames. In a 1752 engraving of the Chelsea Waterworks there is a stumpie with a transom stern.

In the 1800s EW Cooke (1811–1880), made a series of engravings of barges on the river, leaving a record of most of the possible rigs.

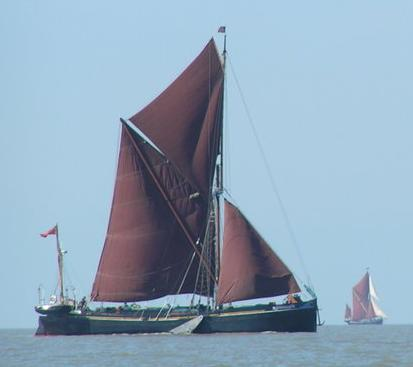
Thames sailing barges, with typical red-brown sails, in the East Swin, off Foulness Point

The flat-bottomed hull made these craft extremely versatile and economical. They could float in as little as 3 ft (0.91 m) of water and could dry out in the tidal waters without heeling over. This allowed them to visit the narrow tributaries and creeks of the Thames to load farm cargoes, or to dry out on the sand banks and mudflats to load materials for building and brickmaking (it was no coincidence that their use peaked while London was expanding rapidly). The main mast could be lowered to clear bridges. Furthermore, unlike most sailing craft, these barges could sail completely unballasted — a major saving in labour and time. The predominant rig was spritsail, though there were some that were sloop rigged with a gaff and an overhanging boom, and some that were ketch rigged. Mulies were rigged spritsail on the main and gaff rigged on the mizzen. The dandy rig had spritsail on the main and a lugsail on the mizzen.

The hull evolved: firstly decks were fitted around 1810, the round bow started to supersede the swim-head about 1840, and became a straight stem by 1900, the transom stern replaced the budget stern about 1860.

1863, 1864 and 1865 saw the first Thames Barge Races. These continued unbroken until 1938. The aim of the founder William Henry Dodd, "The Golden Dustman", was to raise the status of the bargemen, and to improve the performance of the barges. There were two classes, one for stumpies (under 80 tons) and one for heavier (under 100 tons) topsail barges. These were fiercely competitive – and soon new barges were being built, using the improved techniques learnt, to win the next year's race. The Medway races started in 1880.

Their heyday came at the turn of the 20th century when over 2000 were on the registry. That century saw a steady decline in their numbers. The last wooden built barge SB Cabby, was built by Gill, at the LRTC yard in Frindsbury in 1928. The last Thames barge to trade entirely under sail was the Everard-built SB Cambria in 1970, owned by the folk song collector Captain A. W. (Bob) Roberts.

Cambria's last mate was Dick Durham from Leigh-on-Sea, Essex, with whom Bob carried the last freight under sail alone: 100 tons of cattle cake from Tilbury Docks to Ipswich in October 1970. Dick wrote Bob Roberts's biography: The Last Sailorman.

Following the Second World War, the coastal barge trade diminished as the nation became more mechanised. Cargoes went by road instead of by sea, squeezing the purses of the barge owners, until most of the once-handsome barges were given motors and relegated to short, lightering passages within the Thames Estuary.

=== Trade ===
Many cargos were brought by barge into London such as building material. Bricks came from Essex and Kent, cement from Kent and sand was dug by the bargees from the estuary sandbanks. When the barges reached London Bridge, the mast was lowered with the help of 'hufflers' (spare strong blokes), so they could pass under to wharfs in the Pool of London or further upstream to Westminster or beyond. At the wharf the load was removed by horse and cart – the cart could carry one and a half tons over the un-metalled roads. The barge could carry 80 to 150 tons, although 120 was the most common tonnage.

==== Hoy companies ====
There was a well established trading network along both sides of the estuary before the Thames sailing barge became ubiquitous. Each port had a hoy company that would run weekly forays into London to deliver or collect goods. They got their names from the hoy, an open square-sail barge. Typically they would run into London laden on a Monday, discharge and return the Thursday with a new cargo to arrive home to spend the Sunday with their families. By the 1880s they were competing for trade with steam engines on the railways, but could offer rates four or five times cheaper.

==== The hay-up dung-down trade ====
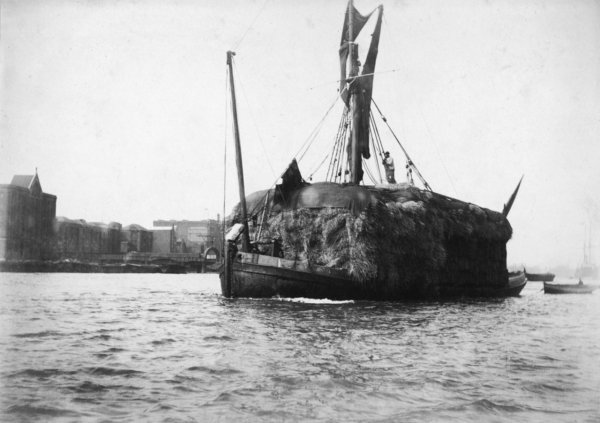
The hay barge Unity

All transport in London was horse-drawn. The horses needed vast quantities of hay and straw, and they produced a vast quantity of dung. The 'Stackie' was a special type of barge designed for the hay and dung trade. The hold would be loaded with fodder root crops and hay would be loaded on the deck, in an inwardly sloping stack eight bales 12 feet (3.7 m) high. This would be covered with a tarpaulin, secured with the hatch covers and roped down. The mainsail had to be smaller to clear this stack (this could be achieved by reefing), and the foresail would be sheeted to a temporary wire horse. Often the stack would also overlap the sides of the vessel, and in all cases it obscured the view from the helm requiring excellent communication between master and mate sailing such an awkward load in a crowded river. On the return run from London, the hold would be filled with dung, useful for farmers but a nuisance in London.

Mirosa was once a stackie barge, built in 1892, extensively raced and chartered since c1970 she is one of the few remaining Thames sailing barges that has never had an engine fitted. Dawn built at Cooks Yard in 1897 was also a stackie. She has been restored and in 2017 is sailing again. Stackies have been popular with model-makers, and two are regularly displayed at the Thames sailing barge pop-up museum. They are Venta and British King.

==== Cut barges ====
The smallest river barges were designed to trade up the Regent's and Surrey canals as well. They had a capacity of 70-80 tons, and a beam of only 14 feet (4.3 m). They were stumpies with a high peaked mainsail. They had little sheer as they had to pass under very low bridges. They stowed their leeboard and lowered their gear flat on deck, so their highest point would be the wheel from which spokes would be removed to gain a few extra inches. When light, the barge would be partially flooded to gain headroom for a bridge or tunnel.

==== Cement barges ====
These were the Kentish Barges from along the Medway. Chalk was quarried between Aylesford and Strood, and the barges shot Rochester Bridge and took the chalk to the many cement works in the region, and then took the cement to London. There was brick and cement activity along the Swale. At Teynham Charles Richardson produced stock bricks that were used in the viaduct that took the railway from Greenwich to London. Cement from his kilns in Conyer was exported from London to New Zealand. These barges were recognised by the covering of ash and cement dust, caused from lying to the lee of cement works. Additionally the Kentish creeks such as Conyer and Milton contained discolouring mud that would foul clean paintwork.

Kentish barges had less need of bowsprits, that the Essex barges found beneficial doing the long run along the Swin (Thames).

==== Grain barges ====
The main trade was trans-shipping grain unloaded from large vessels from the colonies, and taking it from the London ports out to the mills or maltings at the head of the many tidal creeks on the East coast and around the Thames estuary, though also grain was transhipped into London mills further upstream such as the City Flour Mills at Puddle Dock reputed to be the largest in the world when built in the early 1850s. Grain could be carried loose in the hold or bagged. Those delivering grain out of London would then seek a suitable cargo back into London to avoid returning light. A particularly well recorded example of a grain barge is the SB Kathleen, which was a 59-ton barge built by Glover at Gravesend, Kent in 1901, and registered in Rochester. Her official number was 113,708. She was built for capacity rather than speed.; 82.8 feet (25.2 m) long and had a beam of 19.7 feet (6.0 m). Light, she drew 30 inches (76 cm) of water, and laden 6 feet (1.8 m).

==== Brick barges ====
Bricks were made using the heavy Essex clay, or clay deposits from along the Swale which was mixed with local chalk and breeze (town ash). The breeze was the ash screened from London rubbish. This was transported by barge, to Teynham, Lower Halstow and Conyer and the finished Kentish yellow bricks went back to London. A sizeable barge building industry was created in Sittingbourne. These 100 ton capacity barges stowed 40,000 to 42,000 bricks and were box-like in section.

==== Coastal barges ====
Portland stone was brought from the quarries at Weymouth round the North Foreland, into the Thames estuary and up into the London River.

==== North Sea barges ====
The North Sea was important. Coals were brought from Newcastle to the shallow estuary ports along the London River. These essentially were schooner rigged with the flat barge hull. After the Second World War, coal was still delivered to the gasworks at Margate by SB Will Everard from Goole. During the First World War, they carried coal between Goole and Calais; this was four days' work—200 tons at £6.00 a ton. The barges were generally too shallow to activate the mines.

Coastal barges made long passages, SB Havelock of London built in 1858 used to trade regularly between Liverpool and Rotterdam.

=== The matches ===
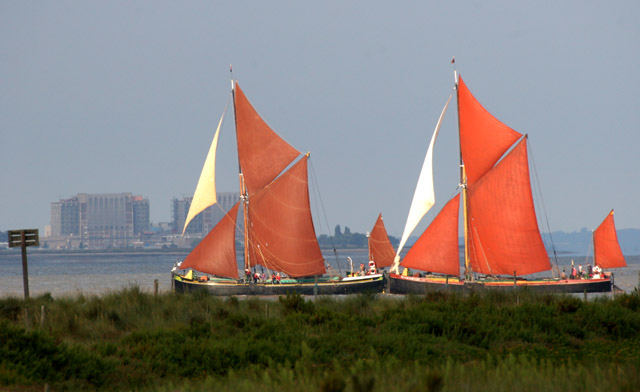
Pudge leading Repertor in a sailing match on the River Colne

The barges' performance was perfected through the annual sailing matches, in which they competed for trophies and cash prizes. The matches are credited with encouraging improvements in design, leading to the craft's highly efficient final form. They were begun in 1863 by a wealthy owner called Henry Dodd. Dodd was a plough boy from Hackney, London, who made his fortune carrying the city's waste to the country on the barges. He may well have been the model for Charles Dickens's character the Golden Dustman in Our Mutual Friend. On his death in 1881, Dodd left £5000 for future match prizes.

The Thames and Medway barge matches were temporarily discontinued in 1963. In the matches that year, Spinaway C (skippered by George Morgan) won the Thames race and came second in the Medway. Memory came second in the Thames (skippered by Hedley Farrington) and first in the Medway (skippered by "Dick" Springett). These two were the very last of the restricted staysail barges to win the old classic races.

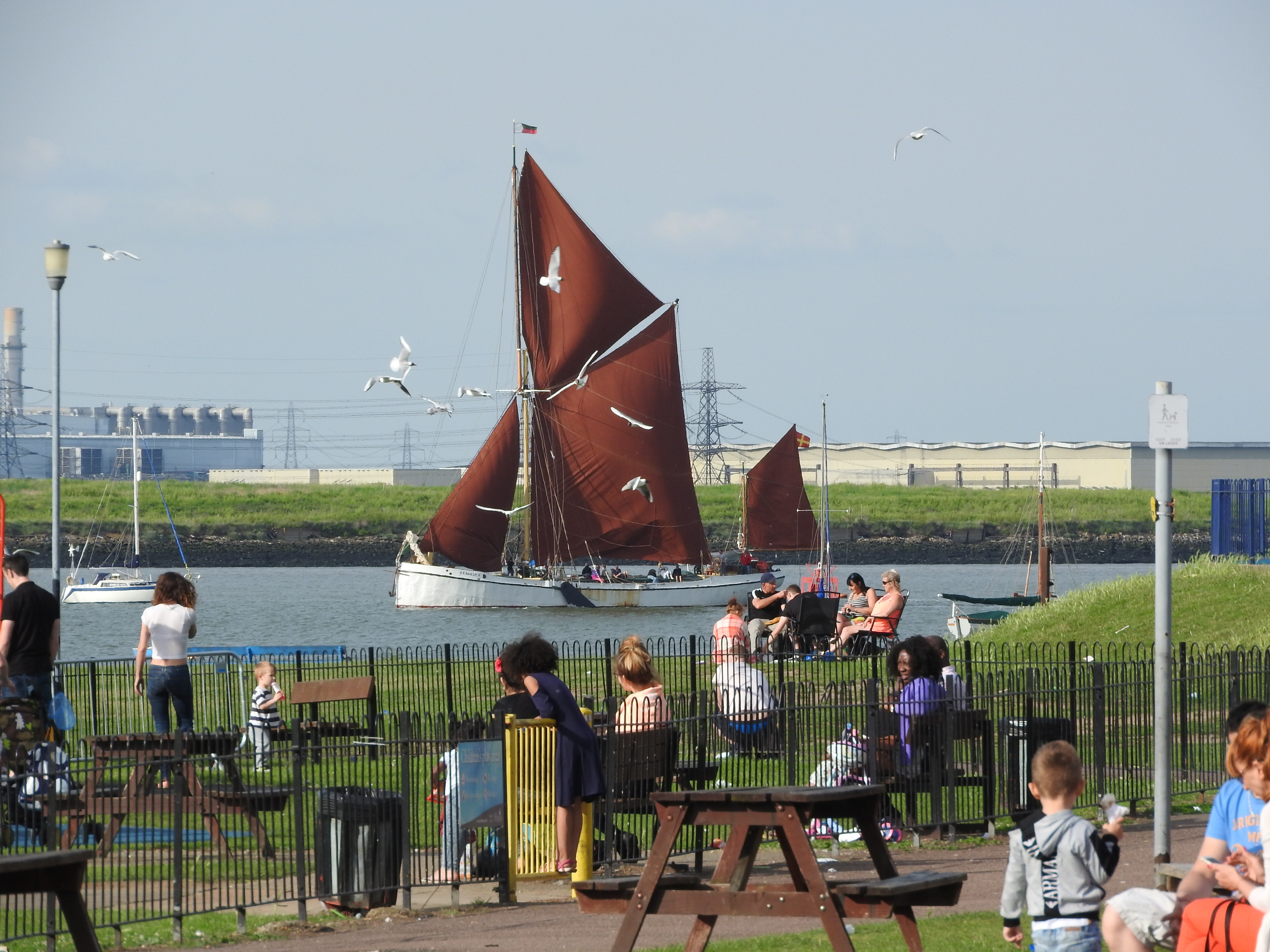
SB Reminder at Gillingham Strand in 2017

The matches have ceased and been reinstituted several times, and are now considered the world's second-oldest sailing race (after the America's Cup). The course was originally from Erith upriver, but as of the early 20th century the start was moved to the Lower Hope downriver from Gravesend into the Estuary and back to Gravesend.

2013 was the 150th anniversary of the Thames Match – and to celebrate the finish line was at Erith. There was a full programme of races in 2017 on the Medway and Thames.

The 109th Medway barge race took place on Saturday 3 June 2017. The course was 29 miles (47 km) from Gillingham Pier, following the channel to the Medway buoy east of the Nore in the Thames and back to Gillingham. The 110th was scheduled for 19 May 2018.

=== Operation Dynamo – the Dunkirk evacuation ===
Thirty barges were part of the fleet of 'Little Ships' that rescued soldiers of the retreating British Expeditionary Force from the beaches of Dunkerque. The flat-bottomed barges could reach the beaches, and take off the troops, ferrying them to the larger vessels waiting off shore. These would make the Channel crossing. Twelve barges were sunk, but eighteen vessels returned: one of these, SB Pudge, was harmed by a mine but has been fixed up and is still used on the rivers today; another, Ena, had her crew taken off and was to be abandoned in France but was floated and sailed home by a group of soldiers with only holiday sailing experience. The oldest Little Ship still active is the barge Greta (built in 1892).

Barges active at Dunkerque
Name	Official number	Year	Location	Fate
Ada Mary	049850	1865	Frindsbury	Returned
Beautrice Maud	129112	1910	Sittingbourne	Returned
Cabby	160687	1928	Frindsbury	Returned
Ena	122974	1906	Harwich	Returned
Glenway	127260	1913	Rochester	Returned
Greta	98324	1892	Colchester	Returned
H A C	???			
Haste Away	086628	1886	Harwich	Returned
Lady Sheila	???			
Monarch	113687/ 120492	1900/1905	Sittingbourne	Returned
Pudge
Queen Alexandra	115856	1902	East Greenwich	Returned
Seine	???			
Shannon	109920	1898	Milton Regis	Returned see also 105792/ 25632
Sherfield	???			
Spurgeon	087219	1883	Murston	Returned
Thyra	127262	1913	Maidstone	Returned
Tollesbury	110315	1901	Sandwich	Returned
Viking	104319/ 114764			Returned
Vessels lost
Aidie		1924	Brightlingsea	lost
Burton	081867	1880	Murston	lost
Barbara Jean	149251	1924	Brightlingsea	abandoned lost
Claude	076584/(017556)	1876	Sittingbourne	lost
Doris	113759	1904	Ipswich	abandoned 3 n.m E of beaches
Duchess	118372	1904	East Greenwich	lost
Ethel Everard	149723	1926	Great Yarmouth	lost
Lady Rosebery	127268	1917	Rochester	lost
Lark	112735	1900	Greenhithe	lost
Queen	089574/???	1884	Limehouse	lost
Royalty	109919	1898	Rochester	lost
Valonia	132631	1911	East Greenwich	lost
Warrior	???			lost

== Construction ==
Thames barges were built for strength. They had flat bottoms to allow them to be easily beached or lie on the river mud, and were rigged to allow them to be operated by two men and possibly a lad. They were built in bargeyards adjacent to a river or creek on bargeblocks- a series of trestles raised about a metre from the compacted ground, that allowed working access above and below. The smallest barges were the river barges of 100 ton capacity, the estuary barges were generally heavier 120 -140 tons and the coasters reaching 160-180 tons. At 280 ton, the four Everards barges built in Great Yarmouth and the R & W Pauls, Brightlingsea built barges Barbara Jean and Aidie were the largest. Barges were built exclusively of wood until 1900, when the first steel barges appeared. During its active life it could be doubled or boxed- that is a second shell of planking would be fixed over the first.

Kathleen was a typical grain barge built at Gravesend in 1901. She became notable by featuring in two reference books, where her measurements were published in great detail. Over time her rig was changed to suit commercial conditions.

The keel was a 12 by 4 inches (30 by 10 cm) piece of elm. It was broader than it was deep and 82.8 feet (25.2 m) long. At the bow the stempost was raised vertically and at the stern the sternpost, these were made from 6 feet (1.8 m) lengths of 12 by 9 inches (30 by 23 cm) English oak. The apron and the inner sternpost were strengthening timbers. The fore and aft deadwood would raise the floors to give shape at the bow and the sweep to the fashion timbers of the transom. Across the keel and deadwood were laid the floors, these were 8 by 6 inches (20 by 15 cm) oak timbers at 20 inches (51 cm) centres. The length of each floor would be taken of a half hull model, most would be 19.7 feet (6.0 m) long, the same length as her beam. On top of the floors, on top of the keel, on earlier barges was bolted a massive Oregon pine 14 by 14 inches (36 by 36 cm) keelson. This used 1 inch (2.5 cm) iron bolts. On Kathleen the keelson was a made of a 49 feet (15 m) steel section, in profile similar to railway line (6 by 11 inches (15 by 28 cm)): it was cheaper but could distort. The keelson would be scarfed into the apron and deadwood and would be shorter than the keel. There were equivalent stemsons and sternsons.

The futtocks (side-frames) were dovetailed onto the end of each floor and every other joint was strengthened with an iron angle plate. The futtocks were of 8 by 6 inches (20 by 15 cm) oak and of varying length averaging 6 feet (1.8 m). Temporary cross-poles were used to hold the ends of the futtocks in place. The barge was now in frame, and the shipwright approved the lines. Ribbands were temporarily nailed to the outside of the frames to hold this position. The inner angle between the floor and the futtocks were stiffened by inner chines or chine keelsons, made of a single piece of 12 by 6 inches (30 by 15 cm) pitch pine This was bolted to each floor and futtock. Above it was a 12 by 3 inches (30.5 by 7.6 cm) oak stringer that was bolted to the futtocks and led out to stem and stern post.

=== Ceilings and linings ===
The ceilings were now laid on the floors. These would be pine planks 3-inch-thick (7.6 cm), and as wide as available. The height of the deck was marked on the frames – forming a beam-line, and a beam thickness beneath it, a 15-by-4-inch (38 by 10 cm) oak inwale was bolted to the futtocks. The inside of the hold was lined with 2 inches (5.1 cm) thick pine. The inwale formed a ledge on which the 8-by-8-inch (20 by 20 cm) curved beams of the deck, and the carlings rested. The two large holds made it impossible to use deckbeams alone. There were 3 beams afore the forehold, three beams under the mast-case between the holds, 2 between the mainhold and the companionway to the cabin, two supporting the transom. On the Kathleen, the port and starboard decks were of differing widths.

=== Leeboards and rudder ===
The leeboards are a distinguishing feature of wherries and Thames barges. They are needed to prevent lateral movement in the absence of a keel. On the Kathleen they were made of 3 inches (7.6 cm) thick oak and strapped with seven iron straps. They weighed around 25 long hundredweight (1,300 kg) were 18 feet (5.5 m) long and had a 8 feet (2.4 m) fan, They were pivoted from the gunwale, and dropped 5 feet (1.5 m) below the hull. They were raised by means of two crab winches. Partially raised leeboards could be used as a means of steering, and in shallow waters, the barge could be pivoted on a leeboard that was being dragged in the mud.

The rudder was attached to a 12 inches (30 cm) square 11 feet (3.4 m) oak rudderpost. The blade of the rudder was 7 feet 4 inches (2.24 m) wide made up of boards tapering from 12 inches (0.30 m) to 6 inches (0.15 m). On older smaller vessels, there was a 12 feet (3.7 m) long tiller. On a few vessels, ropes/chains and pulleys were attached to the rudder post and these lines passed round a drum with a conventional ships wheel- on the vast majority of barges, the rudder was attached to the wheel by an intentionally loose fitting worm screw gear. Some barges had an all metal ships wheel: this was known as the chaff cutter after the similar-looking agricultural tool.

=== The rig ===
Sail plan of Kathleen from 1901 until 1926

When she was built, Kathleen had a bowsprit, main mast and a mizzen mast. She was rigged with spritsails on both masts and a topsail on the main. She was rerigged in 1926 without a bowsprit. In 1946 she lost her mizzen when an engine was added. In 1954 her rig was reduced to that of a motor barge, and from 1961 to 1965 she was used as a lighter, with engine and mast stripped away. When she was converted to a barge yacht for the 1966, 1967 sailing races, her rig was similar to that in 1926.

This was the classic spreetie rig. Early spritsail barges were rigged without a top mast: these were called stumpies, and they sailed as a separate class in the Thames barge race until 1890 which was won by Early Bird. The loose footed spritsail was suited to river work. The rig has the advantage of allowing a high stack of deck cargo. The entire sail can be quickly brailed to the mast, allowing unimpeded access to the deck and hold when loading and unloading. Barges are unballasted and, if overpressed, will heel excessively and must be pulled to wind. As the sheet is eased, the aft end of a boom would drag in the water, making the rudder ineffective and a capsize inevitable. In contrast, the sheet of loose-footed mainsail is just released and control is immediately regained.

As there is no boom to project outboard. the vessel can pass through a narrow gap between moored vessels. Loose-footed sails do suffer from sail twist, which reduces their aerodynamic efficiency when sailing off the wind, which usually is not a commercial issue. Vangs control the head of the mainsail and act a sheets for the topsail, which can be set so as to make use of the air above the wind-shadow of moored ships, warehouses and local features.

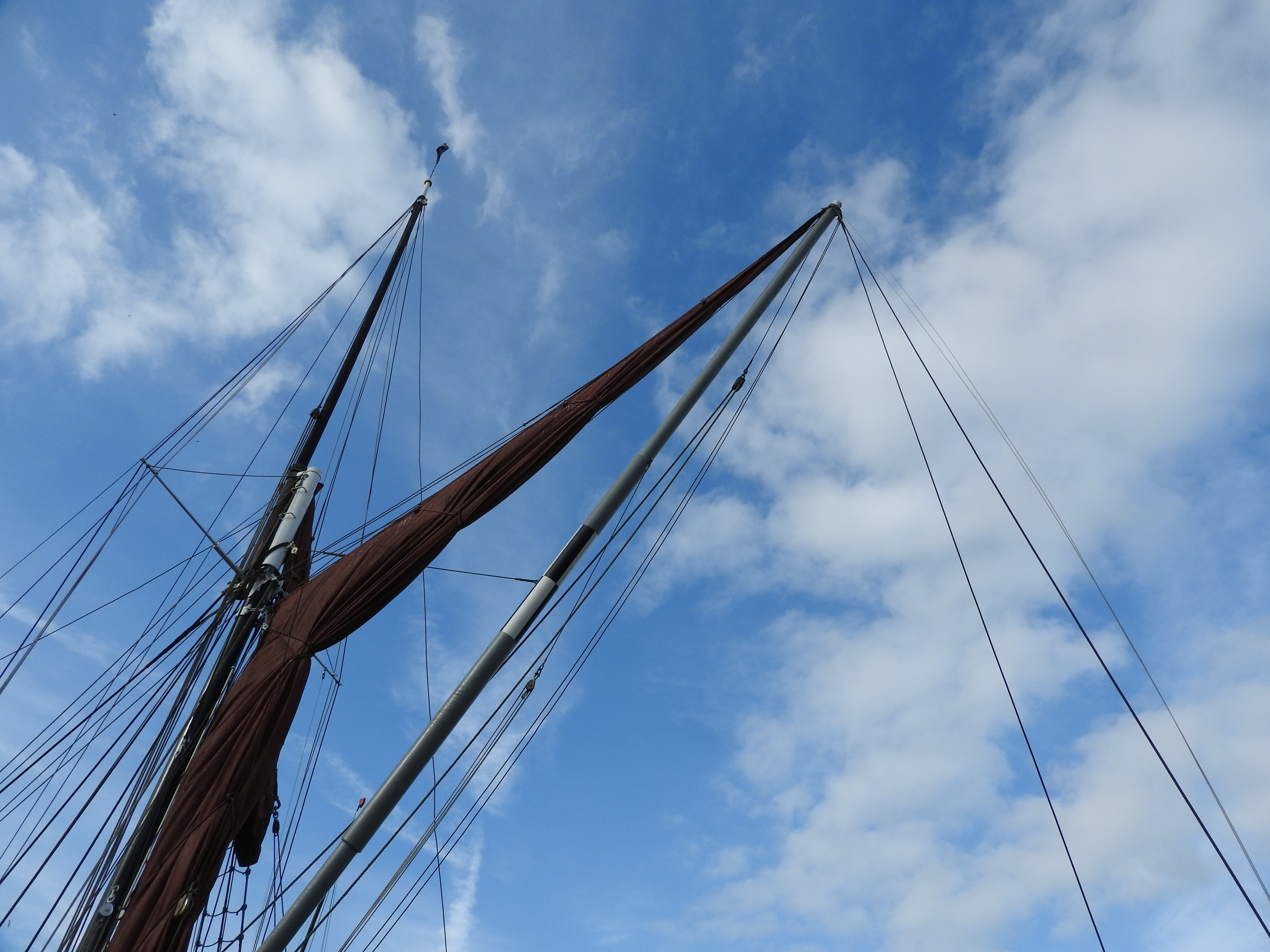
Mainsail brailed to the 'spreet' on SB Xylonite, head of the spar steadied by the vangs.

Sail could be shortened rapidly by the two-man crew in the most difficult seas. The topsail was on hoops, so the halyard was let go and the sail rucked (dropped) to the hounds. The mainsail was pulled tightly to the mast by brails. The vangs were slackened, the sheet released and the sail brailed up by the mate using the brailing winch. The mate let go the foresail halyards and it dropped to the deck. If she was beaching, the crab winches were manned and the leeboards hoisted to stop them bumping. The anchor was let go. She could be unloaded onto the sand when the tide had dropped. The sails were secured and the spreet was fixed and warps and fenders made fast.

In narrow channels, and in the lee of tall buildings the mainsail and mizzen are brailed and the bowsprit topped up, and she sails on topsail and foresail alone. A gaff rig was more suitable for heavy weather and long sea passages, but when a gaff rigged boomie takes in the mainsail, she cannot set the topsail.

A boomie is a flat-bottomed ketch-barge, ketch rigged on the main and the mizzen; the sprit was replaced by a gaff, and the foot was tied to a boom. These were big barges that were built to finer lines often with a false clipper cutwater, and a rounded counter-stern. It had a standing bowsprit, and the mast was stepped on the keelson. It took four or five men to sail, took more space on the wharf and could not operate on its topsail alone, so it was more suited to longer sea journeys; the centre of gravity of the stowed sails was lower and the crew accommodation more comfortable. When times got hard, some of these barges would be re-rigged with a sprit on the main but leaving the gaff on the mizzen, becoming a mulie. The biggest barge ever launched in Kent, Eliza Smeed (1867) was rigged as a barquentine fitted with leeboards.

The Thames and Medway sailing match community divides the barges into two classes: the staysail barges whose foresails are attached to the mainstay, and those having a bowsprit, known as bowsprit barges. The Medway and London river barges generally are staysail barges and the estuary barges that do the longer open water runs up the Swin and the Wallet channels tend to be the larger bowsprit barges. Barges can change rig and class, as the Kathleen did. For racing purposes, extra sail can be carried: additional staysails and spinnakers.

=== Spars ===
The mainmast was made of 11-inch (28 cm) spruce, it was 40 ft (12 m) to the head, and it was 35 ft (11 m) to the hounds. The 10 1/2-inch-diameter (27 cm) sprit was 59 ft (18 m). The 7 1/2 in (19 cm) topmast was 39 ft 6 in (12.04 m) to the hounds, it had a 4 ft 6 in (1.37 m) pole, and a 9 ft (2.7 m) headstick.

The 6 in (15 cm) mizzen mast was 17 ft (5.2 m) to the head. The 6-inch-diameter (15 cm) sprit was 24 ft (7.3 m), and the 4-inch-diameter (10 cm) boom was 14 ft (4.3 m). The 7 in (18 cm) bowsprit was 22 ft 6 in (6.86 m) with 14 ft (4.3 m) outboard.

=== Standing rigging ===
The original barges were rigged with hemp, where most barges in use today use wire ropes. The standing rigging had to hold the masts, and sprit in place. As the masts were lowered and raised to clear bridges the forestay was connected to the windlass. The topmast could be lowered. The lower end of the sprit was held to the mast in a 'muzzle', but held aloft by the 'stanliff' or 'standlift' chain. She was rigged with 3-inch (7.6 cm) shrouds.

=== Sails ===
The mainsail was 27 ft 3 in (8.31 m) (weather), by 34 ft 6 in (10.52 m) (head) with a leech of 49 ft 0 in (14.94 m) and a foot of 35 ft 6 in (10.82 m), giving a sail area of 285 square yards (238 m^{2}).

The topsail was 34 ft (10 m) (weather), with a leech of 34 ft (10 m) and a foot of 31 ft (9.4 m), giving a sail area of 128 square yards (107 m^{2}).

The foresail was 31 ft (9.4 m) (weather), with a leech of 30 ft (9.1 m) and a foot of 26 ft (7.9 m), giving a sail area of 91 1/2 square yards (76.5 m^{2}). The jib was 42 ft (13 m) (weather), with a leech of 28 ft (8.5 m) and a foot of 18 ft 4 in (5.59 m). Her jib topsails were 48 ft (15 m) (weather), with a leech of 33 ft (10 m) and a foot of 21 ft (6.4 m), giving a sail area of 55 square yards (46 m^{2}), and a lighter set with 56 ft (17 m) (weather), with a leech of 38 ft (12 m) and a foot of 24 ft 6 in (7.47 m), giving a sail area of 72 square yards (60 m^{2}).

Her mizzen was 13 ft 6 in (4.11 m) (weather), by 12 ft 0 in (3.66 m) (head) with a leech of 23 ft 6 in (7.16 m) and a foot of 13 ft 6 in (4.11 m), giving a sail area of 285 square yards (238 m^{2}).

The sails on a Thames barge are red ochre in colour. The sailcloth is of flax, and to be kept in a supple and waterproof condition it must be dressed. Importantly, the flax must not dry out or will chafe against the rigging or against the brails when not in use.

== Preservation ==
Inspired by a mention of the Norfolk Wherry Trust in Hervey Benham's book Down Tops'l, the Thames Sailing Barge Trust was founded on 15 April 1952 in the cabin of the sailing barge George Smeed, anchored at Blacktail Spit in the Thames estuary. The committee members were Jim Lawrence (chairman), Colin Leggett (treasurer), John Kemp (organizing secretary), and Tom Hawkins. In 1955, the trust bought the sailing barge Memory, which it operated as a cargo vessel until 1960 when the trust was dissolved. The Thames Sailing Barge Trust referred to here was not the same body as the current organisation with the same name.

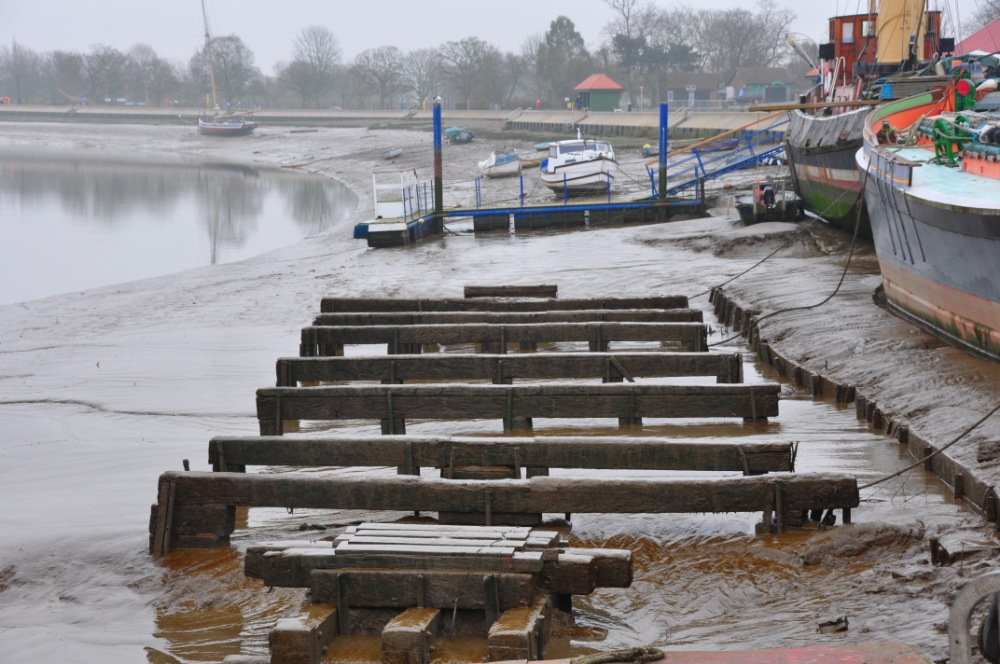
Barge blocks for scraping barnacles and applying anti-fouling paint at Cooks Yard, River Blackwater

Memory was bought from the trust by Sailtrust Limited, a partnership between John Kemp and Brian Beer. Following a suggestion by Hervey Benham, she was converted for use as an adventure training ship. However, the company was unable to make sufficient money from adventure training and they operated Memory as a weekend charter vessel with John Kemp as the skipper. Memory was the first sailing barge to engage in charter work.

In April 1965, Sailtrust Ltd were contracted to the London Borough of Redbridge to take parties of school children sailing, each week from April to October. This contract lasted for eleven years. During the second year of this contract, the Board of Trade tightened up the regulations for charter vessels and Memory could no longer be used for that purpose. She was replaced by the auxiliary sailing barge Thalatta, previously owned by R & W Paul and operated as a cargo ship until 1966. Both barges were skippered by John Kemp, with Jane Benham as mate. Operation of Thalatta was then taken over by the East Coast Sail Trust. She was then re-rigged by the Trust, using some items from the damaged barge Memory. In 2005, the Trust had to repair the hull, using Heritage funding they completed the repairs in 2009. Then in August 2011, they re-launched the barge.

== See also ==
- List of active Thames sailing barges
- Cooks yard – a barge building and repair yard in Maldon, Essex
- Mersey Flat – another flat-bottomed cargo boat on the Mersey Estuary
- Norfolk wherry – another flat-bottomed cargo boat for operating in rivers
- Humber Keel – another traditional river and estuary boat
- Thames River Steamers
- Schooner barge used on North American Great Lakes
- Dutch barge – a wide category of vessels from the Netherlands that includes boats analogous to the Thames barge
