= Benham (surname) =

Benham is an Anglo-Scottish locational surname, from Benham, Berkshire, or Binham, Norfolk. Notable people with the surname include:

- Alfred Ernest Yonge Benham (1888–1962), Australian bass singer
- Andrew E. K. Benham (1832–1905), American admiral
- Charles Benham (1860–1929), author, newspaper editor and amateur scientist
- Chris Benham (born 1983), English cricketer
- Edward Benham (died 1869) printer and editor of Essex County Standard
- Ellen Ida Benham (1871–1917) science teacher in South Australia.
- Flip Benham (born 1948), American Christian fundamentalist
- Gertrude Benham (1867–1938), English mountaineer, traveller and collector
- Henry Washington Benham, 19th-century American soldier
- Isabel Benham (1909–2013), American railroad finance expert
- Jade Benham, Australian politician
- Jane Benham Hay (1829–1904), English artist
- Jessica Benham (born 1990), American politician and disability rights activist
- Joan Benham (1918–1981), English actress
- Hervey Benham (1910–1987); son of Sir William, editor and author on marine topics
- Jane Benham (c. 1943–1992), daughter of Hervey, boat restorer
- Matthew Benham (born 1968), British businessman, owner of Brentford FC
- Robert Benham (judge), Georgia Supreme Court Judge
- Captain Robert Benham, American pioneer, member of First Ohio Legislature
- William Benham (priest) (1831–1910), English churchman and writer
- William Blaxland Benham (1860–1950), New Zealand zoologist and biologist
- William Gurney Benham (1859–1944), English newspaper editor

== See also ==
- Benham (disambiguation)
