= Randall Davidson =

Archbishop of Canterbury from 1903 to 1928

The Most Reverend and Right Honourable Randall Davidson GCVO PC
- Archbishop of Canterbury
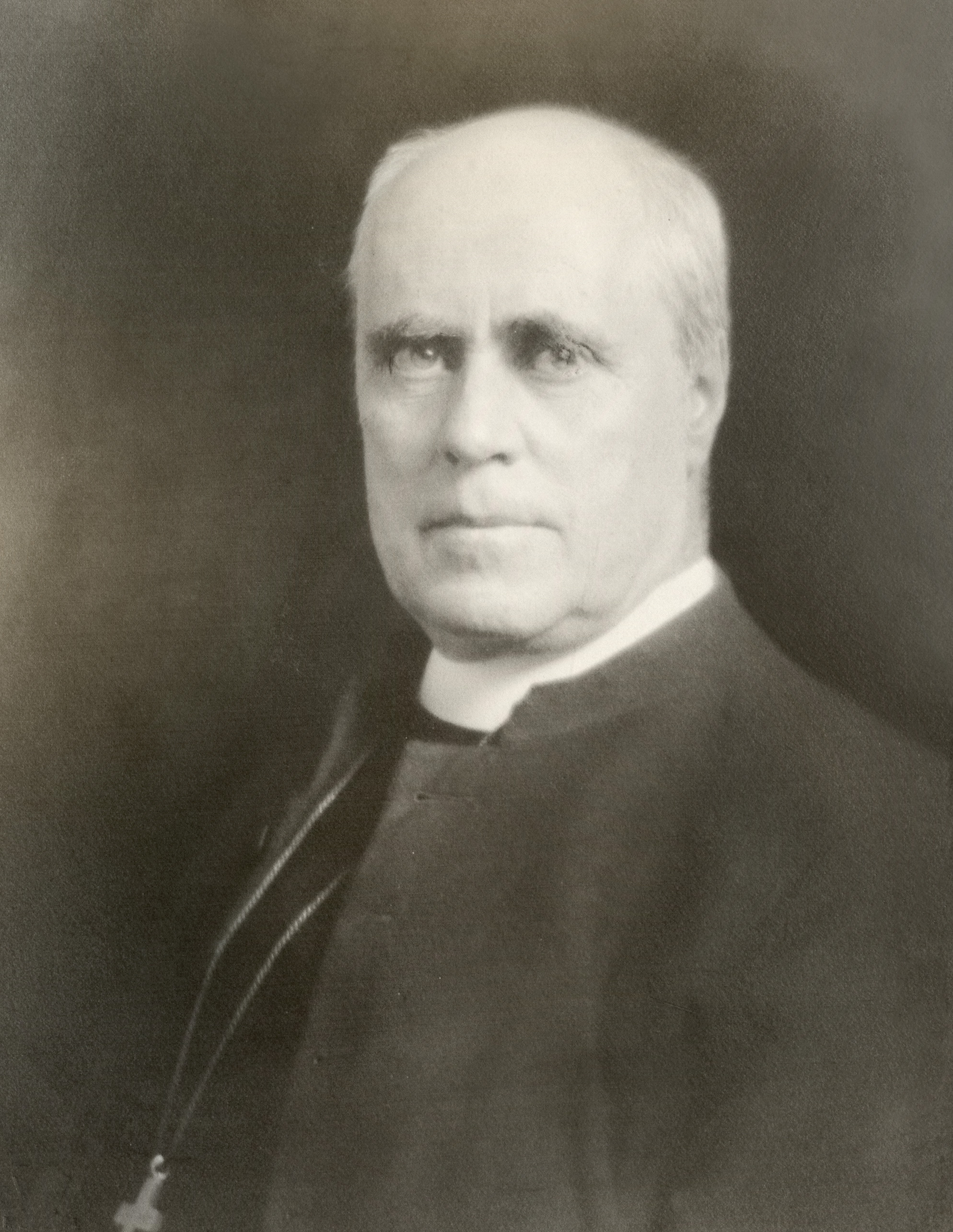
- Formal portrait, 1904
- Church: Church of England
- Province: Canterbury
- Diocese: Canterbury
- Installed: 12 February 1903
- Term ended: 12 November 1928
- Predecessor: Frederick Temple
- Successor: Cosmo Lang
- Previous posts: Bishop of Winchester (1895–1903); Clerk of the Closet to the Sovereign (1891–1903); Bishop of Rochester (1891–1895); Dean of Windsor and domestic chaplain to Queen Victoria (1883–1891)

Orders
- Ordination: 1874 (deacon); 1875 (priest)
- Consecration: 25 April 1891

Personal details
- Born: 7 April 1848 Edinburgh
- Died: 25 May 1930 (aged 82) London
- Denomination: Anglican
- Spouse: Edith Murdoch Tait (m. 1878)

Randall Thomas Davidson, 1st Baron Davidson of Lambeth, GCVO, PC (7 April 1848 – 25 May 1930) was an Anglican bishop who was Archbishop of Canterbury from 1903 to 1928. He was the longest-serving holder of the office since the Reformation, and the first to retire from it.

Born in Edinburgh to a Scottish Presbyterian family, Davidson was educated at Harrow School, where he became an Anglican, and at Trinity College, Oxford, where he was largely untouched by the arguments and debates between adherents of the high-church and low-church factions of the Church of England. He was ordained in 1874, and, after a brief spell as a curate, he became chaplain and secretary to the Archbishop of Canterbury, Archibald Campbell Tait, in which post he became a confidant of Queen Victoria. He rose through the church hierarchy, becoming Dean of Windsor and domestic chaplain to Queen Victoria (1883), Bishop of Rochester (1891) and Bishop of Winchester (1895). In 1903 he succeeded Frederick Temple as Archbishop of Canterbury, and remained in office until his retirement in November 1928.

Davidson was conciliatory by nature, and spent much time throughout his term of office striving to keep the church together in the face of deep and sometimes acrimonious divisions between evangelicals and Anglo-Catholics. Under his leadership the church gained some independence from state control, but his efforts to modernise the Book of Common Prayer were frustrated by Parliament.

Though cautious about bringing the church into domestic party politics, Davidson did not shy away from larger political issues: he played a key role in the passage of the reforming Parliament Act 1911; urged moderation on both sides in the conflict over Irish independence; campaigned against perceived immoral methods of warfare in the First World War and led efforts to resolve the national crisis of the 1926 General Strike. He was a consistent advocate of Christian unity, and worked, often closely, with other religious leaders throughout his primacy. On his retirement he was made a peer; he died at his home in London at the age of 82, eighteen months later.

== Early years ==
Davidson was born in Edinburgh on 7 April 1848, the eldest of the four children of Henry Davidson, a prosperous grain merchant, and his wife Henrietta, née Swinton. Both parents were Church of Scotland Presbyterians – Henry's father, grandfather, and great-grandfather were Presbyterian ministers. The family was, nonetheless, in Davidson's words, "very undenominational ... I have no recollection of receiving any teaching upon Churchmanship, either Episcopal or Presbyterian, the religion taught us being wholly of the personal sort but beautiful in its simplicity." Davidson's biographer George Bell writes that the Davidsons were deeply religious without being solemn, and that it was a happy household. Davidson was educated by his mother and a succession of governesses and private tutors, before being sent, aged 12, to a small private school at Worksop in the English Midlands. The teaching there was inadequate; in particular, Davidson regretted all his life his lack of grounding in Latin and Greek.

Henry Montagu Butler and Brooke Foss Westcott, inspirations at Harrow

In 1862, at the age of 14, Davidson became a pupil at Harrow School. The school was Anglican in its religious teachings and practices, and he took part in confirmation classes. Scarlet fever prevented him from being confirmed along with the other boys at Harrow, and he was confirmed in June 1865 at St George's, Hanover Square by the Bishop of London, Archibald Campbell Tait, a longstanding friend of Henry Davidson. The greatest influences on Davidson at Harrow were Henry Montagu Butler, the headmaster, and Brooke Foss Westcott, his second housemaster. Davidson was inspired by Butler's sermons and by Westcott's wide-ranging instruction on topics from architecture and poetry to philosophy and history. Davidson and Westcott became lifelong friends, and each came to turn to the other for advice.

In the summer holidays of 1866, before his final year at Harrow, Davidson suffered an accident that affected the rest of his life. While rabbit-shooting along with his brother and a friend, Davidson was accidentally shot in the lower back. The wound was severe and could have been fatal, but he slowly recovered. He recalled:

I got about at first on crutches, which I had to use for a long time, and it was supposed that my leg would always be more or less helpless; but by degrees this went away, and I got back full power, save for a permanently weak ankle, which seems a strange effect to follow from a wound in the hip. There were also other troubles inaugurated, which have never passed away, though I have been able to ignore them more or less. Had anyone prophesied in those autumn months that I should a couple of years later be winning a cup at racquets at Oxford, it would have been ludicrous.

Although Davidson gradually made an unexpectedly good recovery, (Note: He was nevertheless left with lifelong after-effects. Some of the shot remained in his body and caused recurring abdominal illness; damage to the hip caused frequent lumbago and a hernia obliged him to wear a truss. Despite this, he remained active throughout his life. In 1926 Winston Churchill recorded his surprise that Davidson, who was by then 78, continued to play squash frequently.) the accident marred his last year at Harrow, where he had hoped to compete for several senior prizes; it also ruined his chances of an Oxford scholarship.

Davidson went up as a commoner to Trinity College, Oxford, in October 1867. The college was undistinguished at the time, and Davidson found the Trinity faculty disappointingly mediocre. Although high-church versus low-church controversies were rife in Oxford, he was not greatly interested in them, being, as always, more concerned with religious than with liturgical considerations. His chief aim was to complete his studies and go on to be ordained as a priest. His health affected his studies; he had hoped to study Greats (classics and philosophy), but as a result of his injuries he had, he later said, "intense difficulty in concentrating thought on books" and opted for the less demanding subjects of law and history. He graduated with a third class Bachelor of Arts degree, conferred in November 1871. (Note: An Oxford MA degree was conferred on Davidson in 1875.)

After leaving Oxford, Davidson rejoined his family in Scotland and then went with his parents on a six-week tour of Italy. On his return he began a course of study in London with Charles Vaughan, Master of the Temple, with a view to ordination. Davidson's health was still precarious, and after three months he was obliged to abandon his studies. After further rest and another leisurely holiday, this time in the Middle East, he resumed his studies in October 1873 and completed them the following March.

== Curate and chaplain ==
Craufurd Tait, aged 26

One of Davidson's closest friends from his Oxford days was Craufurd Tait, son of Archibald Campbell Tait. Like Davidson, Craufurd was preparing for ordination; his father was by now Archbishop of Canterbury, and the two friends were accepted for ordination as deacons in the Archbishop's diocese. They were ordained in March 1874, and Davidson was assigned as curate to the vicar of Dartford in Kent. He was ordained priest the following year. During his two and a half years at Dartford, Davidson served under two vicars; the first was a moderate high churchman and the second a moderate evangelical. Bell writes that the young curate learnt a good deal from each, "both in pastoral work and in piety".

Late in 1876 Craufurd Tait, who was working as his father's resident chaplain and private secretary, wished to move on and the Archbishop chose Davidson to succeed him. In May 1877 Davidson began work at Lambeth Palace, the Archbishop's home and headquarters, beginning what Bell describes as "an association with the central life of the Church of England which lasted more than fifty years". Craufurd Tait died after a brief illness in May 1878; his mother never recovered from this blow and died within the year. Despite the Archbishop's offers of several attractive parishes over the following years, Davidson felt his place was at the side of the bereaved Tait, who came more and more to rely on him, and called him a "true son". Bell sees this as altruism on Davidson's part; later biographers have suggested that there may also have been an element of personal ambition in his decision to remain at the centre of church affairs. (Note: F. E. Smith (Lord Birkenhead) wrote in 1924, "The smiles of Archbishops are very pleasant to young curates. The secretary soon became familiar with every fold of that mantle which he now so decently becomes".)

On 12 November 1878 Davidson married Edith Murdoch Tait (1858–1936), the nineteen-year-old second daughter of the Archbishop. Cosmo Lang, Davidson's friend and eventual successor at Canterbury, described the marriage as a "perfect union of mind and spirit". Edith Davidson became known as a gracious hostess and a supportive wife. There were no children of the marriage.

Archbishop Tait, 1876

Over the next four years Davidson played an increasingly influential role at Lambeth Palace. He grew to know Tait's mind thoroughly, and the Archbishop placed complete confidence in his son-in-law, delegating more and more to him. Davidson took the lead on Tait's behalf in the controversy in 1881 between high-church proponents and evangelical opponents of ritualism; in 1882 he played an important part in discouraging Anglican overtures to the Salvation Army, an organisation in which he thought too much power was in the hands of its general.

In 1882 Tait told Davidson that he hoped to be succeeded either by the Bishop of Winchester, Harold Browne, or the Bishop of Truro, Edward White Benson. Tait did not think it correct to make his preference known to Queen Victoria or the Prime Minister, W. E. Gladstone, but after Tait's death in December 1882 Davidson ensured that the Archbishop's views became known to the Queen. Within days she sent for Davidson and was impressed: she wrote in her diary that she was "much struck ... Mr. Davidson is a man who may be of great use to me". In the Oxford Dictionary of National Biography Stuart Mews comments that at the age of 34 Davidson quickly became the trusted confidant of the 63-year-old queen. (Note: The biographer Sidney Dark suggests that Davidson's influence may have been at least as important as Gladstone's in the choice of Benson. Later biographers such as Bell and Mews make no such suggestion.) When Benson was chosen to succeed Tait, Victoria asked Davidson's views on who should be the next Bishop of Truro; she also consulted him about a successor to the Dean of Windsor, Gerald Wellesley, who died in 1882 after 28 years in the post.

Davidson remained at Lambeth Palace as chaplain and secretary to Benson, but in May 1883 the new Dean of Windsor, George Connor, died suddenly after only a few months in office. On Benson's advice, the Queen appointed Davidson to the vacancy.

== Dean ==
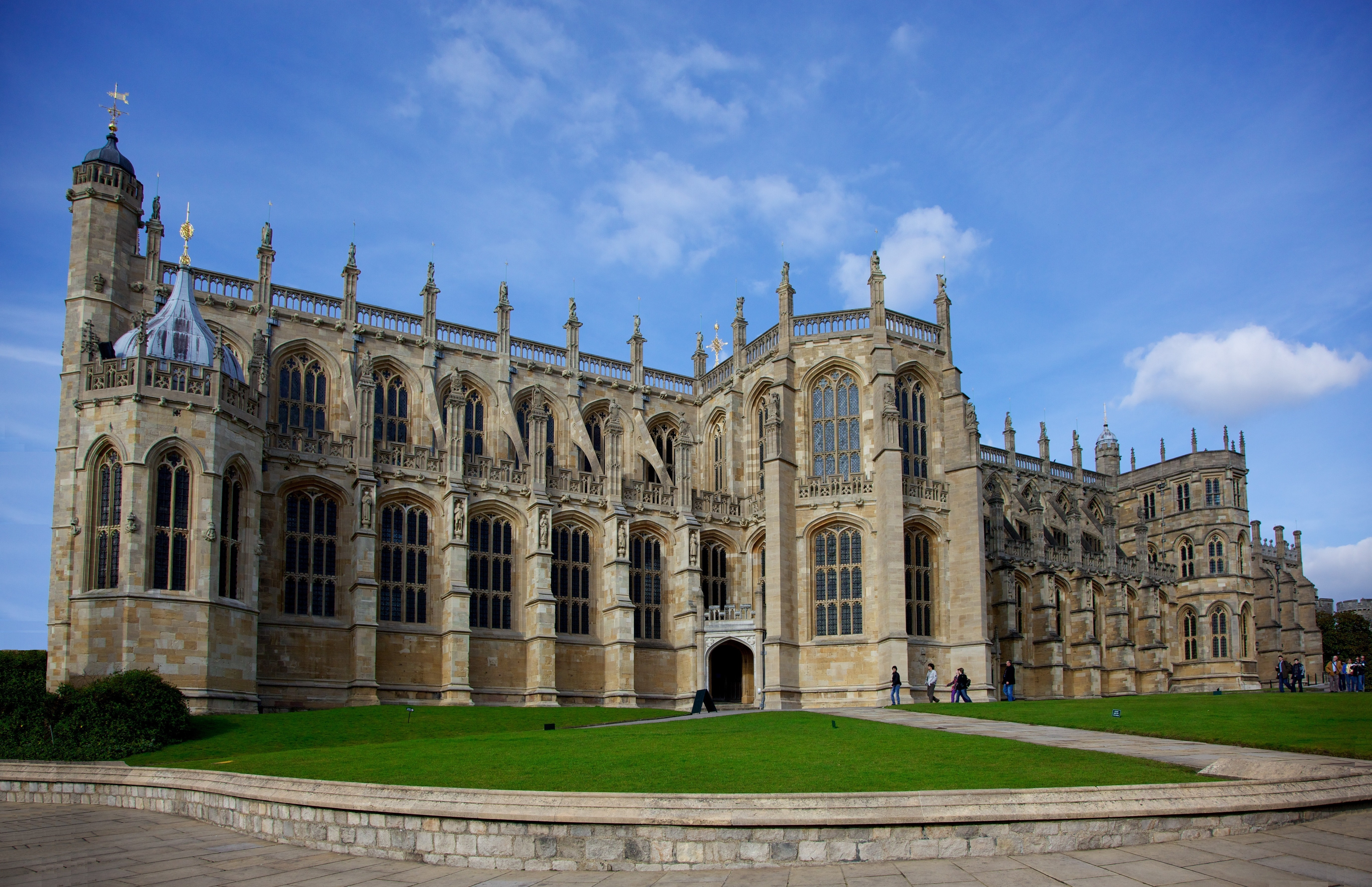
St George's Chapel, Windsor

At Windsor, Davidson served as Dean – and also as the Queen's private chaplain – for six years. She became increasingly attached to him; they developed closer personal relations after the death of her youngest son, Leopold, Duke of Albany, in March 1884. That, and other private tribulations, led her to turn to Davidson for religious consolation and thus, in Bell's words, "to give him more and more of her confidence in a quite exceptional way". The Queen consulted Davidson about all important ecclesiastical appointments from 1883 to 1901. In other matters his advice was not always to her taste, and tact was needed to persuade her to change her mind. He wrote in his diary, "There is a good deal more difficulty in dealing with a spoilt child of sixty or seventy than with a spoilt child of six or seven", but he later said, "my belief is that she liked and trusted best those who occasionally incurred her wrath, provided that she had reason to think their motives good". His biographers cite his tactful but resolute counsel that Victoria would be imprudent to publish another volume of her Leaves from the Journal of a Life in the Highlands. (Note: Davidson's strongly held view – expressed with the utmost tact – was that the lower classes made mock of the Queen for her accounts of her holidays at Balmoral, and particularly for her relationship with her ghillie, John Brown, about which, he thought, the less said the better.) She reluctantly followed his advice.

As well as advising the Queen, Davidson remained a key adviser to the Archbishop of Canterbury. Benson wrote to him nearly every day, and particularly depended on him in 1888–1890 during the trial of Edward King, the high-church Bishop of Lincoln, on a charge of unlawful ritualistic practices. (Note: The charges against the Bishop were that he had contravened the prescriptions of the Book of Common Prayer by what low-church critics felt were unacceptably high-church practices, including celebrating Holy Communion facing the altar rather than facing the congregation, having lighted candles on the altar, and making the sign of the cross at both absolution and blessing. The charges were mostly dismissed, although King was bidden to refrain, inter alia, from making the sign of the cross.) Davidson helped to influence church and public opinion by writing in The Times; he also helped Benson by liaising with Lord Halifax, a prominent Anglo-Catholic layman. While Dean of Windsor, Davidson collaborated with Canon William Benham in writing a two-volume biography of Tait, which was published in 1891.

== Bishop ==
=== Rochester ===
By 1890 it was clear that despite the Queen's reluctance to lose him from Windsor, Davidson's promotion to a bishopric was overdue. He was offered the choice between two vacant dioceses: Worcester and Rochester. At the time – before the creation of the diocese of Southwark – Rochester included all London south of the River Thames, and was the third-largest in England. Davidson chose it in preference to Worcester, explaining to the Prime Minister, Lord Salisbury, that from his years at Lambeth he knew the area and its clergy so well that he was certain he could do more there than in Worcester, which he hardly knew.

Davidson in 1890

In Westminster Abbey on 25 April 1891 Benson consecrated Davidson as a bishop. Eleven days later Davidson fell dangerously ill from a perforated ulcer, and was confined to his house in Kennington for six months. His enthronement at Rochester Cathedral had to be postponed until October, when he was able to resume his work. During a miners' strike in 1893 he was prominent in pleading for a decent standard of living as an essential condition for the settlement of labour disputes. His politics were not radical; he did not join the Christian Social Union set up by Westcott and others in 1889 to bring the tenets of Christianity to national economic and social affairs. He focused on the role of the church: Christian charity, he believed, required it to do everything possible to help relieve the poor. He rejected the idea that "in any department of social life ... we can safely brush aside even for an hour the consideration of what Christ would have us do". Appointed Clerk of the Closet immediately after his consecration, he remained in close touch with Queen Victoria. He continued to be Benson's close and loyal ally in the work of the church, particularly during 1894–95 when Halifax and other high churchmen attempted to draw the Archbishop into negotiation with Rome to seek papal recognition of Anglican orders. (Note: Davidson warned Halifax that a mere recognition of Anglican orders by the papacy would do nothing to overcome the deeper divisions between Rome and Canterbury. Halifax's intervention had the reverse effect from the one he intended: Pope Leo XIII formally made the Vatican's position explicit, declaring Anglican orders null and void in the eyes of the Roman Catholic Church.)

In 1895, towards the end of his time in the diocese, Davidson's seniority as a bishop entitled him to a seat in the House of Lords. (Note: The 26 senior diocesan bishops sat, and (2023) still sit, as Lords Spiritual as opposed to Lords Temporal. Davidson succeeded to a seat on the death of James Atlay, Bishop of Hereford.) He relished the ability to contribute to debates, but he had suffered three more spells of illness during his four years in south London, and it became plain that his health was too poor for him to continue in the exceptionally demanding post of Bishop of Rochester.

=== Winchester ===
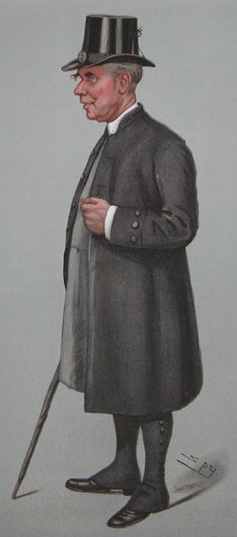
As Bishop of Winchester, by Spy in Vanity Fair, 1901

In 1895 Davidson accepted the offer of translation to the largely rural diocese of Winchester, where the workload was less onerous. He renewed his regular contact with the Queen, who spent much time in the diocese, at Osborne House on the Isle of Wight. Archbishop Benson died the following year and was succeeded by the Bishop of London, Frederick Temple. (Note: The three candidates considered were Temple, Davidson and Mandell Creighton. The last had been consecrated bishop alongside Davidson in 1891, and distinguished himself as Bishop of Peterborough, and was favoured by the Archbishop of York (William Maclagan) and the Prince of Wales to succeed Benson; Queen Victoria would have preferred Davidson; and Salisbury's conclusive recommendation was for Temple. Creighton was then invited to succeed Temple at London.) The Queen vetoed a proposed offer of the vacant bishopric of London to Davidson, on the grounds that his health would not stand it. Temple, unlike his two predecessors, did not turn to Davidson for advice; (Note: Temple incorrectly suspected Davidson of seeking the appointment to the see of Canterbury for himself. Temple had earlier said of Davidson, "My only doubt is whether so much political sagacity is altogether compatible with perfect piety".) he had a reputation for isolating himself from all the bishops and their views. Davidson greatly regretted his sudden exclusion from national church affairs.

Within his diocese Davidson was drawn into controversy over a high-church breach of canon law by Robert Dolling, a fervent Anglo-Catholic priest, who liked to be called "Father Dolling". Davidson discovered that Dolling had installed a third altar at his newly built church, to be reserved for masses for the dead. The Church of England disowned the Roman Catholic belief in Purgatory and the efficacy of praying for souls in it. (Note: Number XXII of the Thirty-nine Articles of Religion reads "The Romish Doctrine concerning Purgatory, Pardons, Worshipping and Adoration, as well of Images as of Relics, and also Invocation of Saints, is a fond thing, vainly invented, and grounded upon no warranty of Scripture, but rather repugnant to the Word of God".) Davidson saw Dolling and tried to reach a compromise that would bring the latter's practices within Anglican rules. Dolling refused to compromise and resigned, leaving the diocese. His supporters were critical of Davidson; Mews cites a high-church journalist who concluded that the episode left its mark on Davidson "in forming his determination not to be the archbishop who drove the high-church party out of the Church of England". Though traditionally Protestant in his rejection of some aspects of Roman Catholic doctrine such as Benediction, he thought his evangelical colleagues were too easily upset by "incense, copes and other adornments", which had no doctrinal significance.

Davidson was at the bedside of the dying Queen Victoria, and played a major role in the arrangements for her funeral in early 1901. When the see of London again fell vacant in February 1901, on the death of Mandell Creighton, it was offered to Davidson, who refused it on firm medical advice. He spoke frequently in the House of Lords, particularly on such topics as education, child protection, alcohol licensing, and working hours in shops. He involved himself when he could in national church policy. His grasp of the issues impressed the Prime Minister, Arthur Balfour, who recorded that "the Bishop has the art of stating with great clearness and sympathy the gist of opinions from which he differs" and said that he understood the position of Halifax and the Anglo-Catholic lobby better after discussing it with Davidson.

Balfour continued to seek Davidson's advice. The government sought to reform primary education, and Davidson's input to the framing of the Education Bill of 1902 was greatly valued by Balfour, as was his advice on how to defend the bill against vociferous nonconformist opposition, led by the Baptist minister John Clifford. Behind the scenes, Davidson was a key contributor to the coronation of Edward VII in August 1902; the Dean of Westminster was ill, and Davidson was called on to arrange the order of service and to act as the link between Buckingham Palace and Lambeth Palace. Four months after crowning the King, Archbishop Temple died and Balfour nominated Davidson as his successor.

== Archbishop of Canterbury ==
When Temple was appointed in 1896 there had been three candidates under consideration for the Archbishopric; in 1902 Davidson was the only one. It was a generally popular choice, except among the more militant Anglo-Catholics. He was enthroned at Canterbury on 12 February 1903. From the outset, Davidson, unlike Temple, was happy to turn to colleagues for advice. In a 1997 study, Edward Carpenter describes the most prominent of them: John Wordsworth, Bishop of Salisbury, "a man of great if somewhat restricted ecclesiastical learning"; Francis Paget, Bishop of Oxford, "a scholar and theologian"; Edward Talbot, Bishop of Rochester, "a practical Diocesan"; Cosmo Lang, Bishop of Stepney and later Archbishop of York, "a fellow Scotsman who made Lambeth his London home and became almost indispensable" and Lord Stamfordham, who had been Queen Victoria's private secretary.

Davidson's constant concern was for what he called "the great central party in the English Church". He was a prime mover in efforts to update the Book of Common Prayer to make it comprehensible to 20th century congregations, and he aimed to accommodate all the clergy of the Church of England within Anglican doctrine, bringing the few high-church extremists back into obedience to church rules. With his cautious support, Balfour set up a Royal Commission to enquire into and propose remedies for the prevalent disorders in the church. It concluded that the church needed more control over its own affairs, but that the laws governing its practices must be enforced. Davidson was neither a diehard conservative nor an adventurous reformer, but steered a middle course. On the government's wish to reform the marriage laws to allow a widower to marry his late wife's sister he opposed reform (unsuccessfully); (Note: This possibility had been a matter of controversy for decades. Marriage with a deceased wife's sister had been added to the church's list of prohibited marriages in 1835. Gladstone had been among the prominent Liberals allied with the Marriage Law Reform Association seeking the overturning of the ban. In 1882 W. S. Gilbert made fun of the recurrent controversy in Iolanthe: "that annual blister, marriage with deceased wife's sister". The ban was overturned by Parliament in 1907.) on the interpretation of the Athanasian Creed he took a liberal line. (Note: The question was how literally Christians should take the clauses of the creed that threatened damnation to those who do not keep the faith "whole and undefiled".)

Davidson, c. 1908

In August 1904 Davidson, accompanied by his wife, sailed to the United States to attend the triennial convention of the American Episcopal Church; he was the first Archbishop of Canterbury to visit the US. He met many church leaders in the US and Canada, and established closer links between the Anglican churches of England and North America. This accomplishment abroad was followed by a setback at home: Davidson's unsuccessful attempt to bring political leaders to agree about national education policy. The Liberals had opposed the passage of the 1902 Education Act, and once in office in 1906 they reopened the issue. Their attempts at further reform were opposed by the Conservatives, and from 1906 to 1908 Davidson strove to bring the two sides to compromise. His failure to secure agreement and achieve a cohesive primary education system was one of the major regrets of his life. In 1907 Davidson disappointed some Liberals by not explicitly backing state old-age pensions, but he declined to do so merely in the abstract, insisting on detailed proposals before expressing support. He was much more forthcoming on atrocities by the Belgians in the Congo and the Bulgarians in Macedonia, which he condemned vehemently.

=== Lambeth Conference, 1908 ===
In July and August 1908 Davidson presided over the fifth Lambeth Conference of bishops from the world-wide Anglican communion; 241 bishops were present. The chief subjects of discussion were: the relations of faith and modern thought; the supply and training of the clergy; education; foreign missions; revision and "enrichment" of the Prayer-book; the relation of the church to "ministries of healing" such as Christian Science; the questions of marriage and divorce; organisation of the Anglican Church; and reunion with other churches. Public interest focused on the bishops' desire for Christian unity. The resolutions showed a will for reunion, but a caution in taking any step towards the nonconformists that might destroy the possibility of ultimate reunion with the Roman Catholic or Orthodox churches.

=== Domestic affairs, 1909–1911 ===
In 1909 David Lloyd George as Chancellor of the Exchequer found his radical budget blocked by the Conservative majority in the House of Lords; a few bishops voted for or against the government's bill, but Davidson, like most of the 26 Lords Spiritual, abstained. (Note: The votes or abstentions of the Lords Spiritual had no practical effect on the outcome: the Lords rejected the government's bill by 350 votes to 75.) Partisans, both conservative and radical, criticised Davidson for his abstention, but he felt that being identified with one side or the other in party politics would bring the church into disrepute.

1911 vote on the Parliament Bill in the House of Lords: all but two of the bishops follow Davidson into the pro-government voting lobby (top l.) (Note: The two bishops (rear centre-right) walking towards the opposition lobby are Watkin Williams, Bishop of Bangor, and Huyshe Yeatman-Biggs, Bishop of Worcester.)

The Prime Minister, H. H. Asquith, secured the King's reluctant agreement to create as many new peerages for government supporters as was necessary to secure a majority in the Lords. At the end of April 1911 Davidson convened a private meeting at Lambeth Palace to try to resolve the constitutional impasse; the other three attending were Balfour, Lord Knollys and Lord Esher – respectively, Leader of the Opposition, the King's private secretary, and an influential politician and courtier. Balfour said that if invited by the King, he would consider forming a minority Conservative government, so that the question of creating new Liberal peers would not arise; he subsequently decided that he would not be justified in doing so. A week after this meeting Edward VII died, and was succeeded by George V.

The Lords continued to resist the will of the Commons, even after a general election fought on the issue. Asquith proposed the 1911 Parliament Bill, to enshrine the supremacy of the Commons in British law, and King George followed his father in agreeing to create hundreds of Liberal peers, should it become necessary to ensure the bill was passed. Davidson, having unsuccessfully striven to bring the party leaders to compromise, voted for the bill. The votes of the Lords Spiritual were crucial in its passage through the Lords, where the majority was only 17. The two archbishops and eleven bishops voted with the government; two bishops voted against. There were strident protests that the bishops were harming the church by taking sides, but Davidson had come to regard this as a matter on which the church must take a stand. He believed that were the bill not passed, the creation of what he called "a swamping majority" of peers would make Parliament and Britain a worldwide laughing-stock, and would have grave constitutional implications for church and state. (Note: Among Davidson's concerns was the question of legislation affecting the church, particularly with regard to Welsh disestablishment, which Liberals generally supported.) His speech in the Lords was credited with tipping the balance.

On 22 June 1911, Davidson presided at the coronation of the new sovereign. The service largely followed the form he had arranged for the 1902 service, except for a revised coronation oath, less offensive to the King's Roman Catholic subjects, (Note: The existing text, dating from the 17th century, referred to some teachings of the Roman Catholic Church, particularly transubstantiation, as "superstitious and idolatrous". Davidson successfully proposed omitting this section of the oath.) and Davidson's crowning of both King George and Queen Mary. In contrast, in the 1902 coronation, Queen Alexandra had been crowned by the Archbishop of York. When the King left Britain for the Delhi Durbar later in the year, Davidson was one of the four Counsellors of State appointed to transact royal business in the monarch's absence. (Note: The others were Prince Arthur of Connaught, the Lord Chancellor (Lord Loreburn) and the Lord President of the Council (Lord Morley). They held office from November 1911 to the end of January 1912, when the King returned from India.)

=== Kikuyu controversy 1913–1914 ===
Skirmishing between Anglican factions continued with the Kikuyu controversy in 1913–14. William George Peel, who was the Bishop of Mombasa, and John Jamieson Willis, the Bishop of Uganda, attended an interdenominational missionary conference at the Church of Scotland's parish in Kikuyu, British East Africa, during which they took part in an ecumenical communion service together with their nonconformist colleagues. For this, and their agreement to cooperate with other churches in their missionary work, they were denounced by Frank Weston, the Bishop of Zanzibar. Weston, described by Mews as a "champion of Anglo-Catholic hardliners", sought their trial for heresy. He was backed by the Bishop of Oxford, Charles Gore, the most vociferous of the Anglo-Catholic bishops. (Note: Hensley Henson, Dean, and later Bishop, of Durham, privately described Weston and Gore as "fanatical in temper, bigoted in their beliefs, and reckless in their methods".) Davidson's private view was that the attending bishops had been "rash" but the denunciations by Weston and Gore "preposterous" and "absurdly vituperative". The issue was debated in the press for several weeks but Davidson's inclusive and pragmatic views prevailed, and the controversy dwindled away.

=== First World War, 1914–1918 ===
Davidson (kneeling, l.) and George V (kneeling, r.) at a service to pray for peace, Westminster Abbey, 1917

The outbreak of the First World War was a severe shock to Davidson, who had held that war between Britain and Germany was inconceivable. But he was clear that it was a just war in which it was Britain's duty to fight because of "the paramount obligation of fidelity to plighted word and the duty of defending weaker nations against violence". He was reconciled to allowing clergy to serve as non-combatants, but not as combatants.

When a group of theologians in Germany published a manifesto seeking to justify the actions of the German government, Davidson was ready to respond. At the government's request he took the lead in collaborating with a large number of other religious leaders, including some with whom he had differed in the past, to write a rebuttal of the Germans' contentions but unlike some of his colleagues in the church, Davidson, in Bell's words, "felt the horror of war too keenly to indulge in anti-German rhetoric". As The Times put it, "He was never betrayed into the wild denunciations and hysterical approval of war to which some ecclesiastics gave utterance". He donated to a fund to help Germans and Austro-Hungarians in Britain, where they were classed as enemy aliens.

Throughout the war Davidson criticised the use of what he considered immoral methods of warfare by the British side. (Note: He wrote, "the principles of morality forbid a policy of reprisal which has, as a deliberate object, the killing or wounding of non-combatants ... the adoption of such a mode of retaliation, even for barbarous outrages, would permanently lower the standard of honourable conduct between nation and nation". He said in the House of Lords that Christianity required Britain to fight in a way that "in the coming years, whatever record leaps to light, we shall never be ashamed".) Most of his objections were made privately to political leaders, but some were public, and he was bitterly attacked for them. Mews records "hate mail flood[ing] into Lambeth Palace". Davidson protested against the false information put out to hide British military reverses, (Note: With regard to Davidson's protests about the government's deceit of the public over British losses, Winston Churchill, the First Lord of the Admiralty, told Asquith, "I arranged some time ago not to publish any more Navy Lists during the war. I don't know who studies them except the German Admiralty and the Archbishop of Canterbury".) the use of poison gas, the punitive bombing of Freiburg in April 1917 and the targeting of non-combatants. In 1916 he crossed to France for an eight-day visit to combatant troops at the Western front.

While the war was going on, civil strife in Ireland was another matter of concern to Davidson. He spoke against the death sentence passed on Sir Roger Casement for his part in the Easter Rising, and post-war condemned the violence of the Black and Tans.

In the last year of the war Davidson had to deal with further agitation from the high-church faction. Gore took exception to the liberal theology of Hensley Henson and attempted to thwart the Prime Minister's nomination of Henson for a bishopric. (Note: The Prime Minister was Lloyd George, who had succeeded Asquith in 1916.) Opinion among the laity and most of the clergy was against Gore. Davidson, who hated unnecessary conflict, was distressed by the controversy, and even considered resigning. But, despite Henson's fear that the Archbishop might weaken, Davidson stood by him, and the two agreed that Henson would issue a statement of faith to silence the critics. Davidson then stated publicly that no fair-minded man could read Henson's sermons without feeling that they had in him a brilliant and powerful teacher of the Christian faith. Gore and his followers were obliged to call off their protests.

Throughout the war, Davidson distanced himself from pacifism. For him, Christian idealism must be accompanied by political realism. He maintained that alongside prayer and witness, Christians had a "duty to think", and that peace would come "when we have given our mind – yes, mind as well as heart – to these new and brave resolves". With this conviction in mind, he was a strong supporter of the League of Nations when it was set up after the war.

=== Enabling Act, 1919 and Welsh disestablishment, 1922 ===
Up to this point the Church of England had little power to make its own rules. As the established church it was subject to parliamentary control, and had no independent authority to initiate legislation. The Enabling Act, strongly backed by Davidson, gave the church the right to submit primary legislation for passage by Parliament. The historian Jeremy Morris calls it "probably the most significant single piece of legislation passed by Parliament for the Church of England in the twentieth century", and summarises its effects:

It led to the full integration of lay representatives with the two houses of clergy and bishops into a new Church Assembly. It provided some legislative autonomy for the Church, thus drawing the sting of anti-establishmentarian criticism, and instituted at local level the Parochial Church Councils which constitute the bedrock of the Church of England's representative system today.

Davidson failed to achieve his aims over Welsh disestablishment. Unlike England, Wales had long been mainly nonconformist; the Anglican church there was widely seen as that of the ruling elite, and its legal status as the official church of the principality was strongly resented. The historian Callum G. Brown quotes the view that "church disestablishment was to Wales what home rule was to the Irish". There had been pressure since the 1880s for disestablishment, and bills to bring it about had been unsuccessfully put to Parliament in 1894, 1895, 1911 and 1912. Davidson was against disestablishment, but Parliament finally voted for it in 1914 and after considerable delay it came into effect in 1922.

=== Lambeth Conference, 1920 ===
Procession of bishops at the 1920 Lambeth Conference

At Davidson's instigation the sixth Lambeth Conference was held as soon as practicable after the end of the war. It met at Lambeth Palace in July and August 1920; 252 bishops attended. The bishops reaffirmed the Lambeth Quadrilateral – the four fundamentals of the Anglican Communion's doctrine. From this starting-point they developed the major initiative of the conference, the "Appeal to all Christian People", which set out the basis on which Anglican churches would seek to move towards union with churches of other traditions.

Other resolutions of the conference welcomed the League of Nations "as an expression of Christianity in politics", affirmed the eligibility of women for the diaconate, and declared marriage an indissoluble and life-long union, with no acceptable ground for divorce except adultery. The bishops denounced birth control, spiritualism, and attempts to communicate with the dead. Christian Science and theosophy were stated to involve grave error, but were given credit for showing a reaction against materialism.

=== General Strike, 1926 ===
In May 1926 a general strike was called by the Trades Union Congress (TUC) in an attempt to force the government to do something to prevent wage cuts and ameliorate worsening conditions for British coal miners. Some 2.5 million workers struck from 3 to 12 May, paralysing transport and industry. Davidson sought to play a conciliatory role; the historian G. I. T. Machin calls his intervention "probably the most celebrated actions of his twenty-five years as Archbishop of Canterbury". Davidson first spoke about the strike on 5 May, addressing the Lords. He expressed disapproval of the strike but called on the Government to act to end the industrial bitterness. Two days later he convened an interdenominational group of church leaders and they drew up an appeal for a negotiated settlement. They called for the resumption of talks in a spirit of cooperation, with three tenets: the TUC should call off the general strike, the government should agree to subsidise the coal industry for a short time, and the mine owners should withdraw the disputed wage terms. Davidson wished to make the appeal known to the whole country by making a radio broadcast, but John Reith, the general manager of the BBC, refused to allow it, fearing reprisals from the government.

The initiative was only partly successful – though the strike was called off, the miners' grievances were not remedied – but the joint action by Davidson and the other religious leaders was a further step in the direction of unity. One of the nonconformist clerics told Davidson, "For the first time in my life it has been possible to feel that the Christian forces in this country were united and courageous, and for that we have to thank your leadership. A new sense of unity has been given to us."

=== Revision of the Book of Common Prayer ===
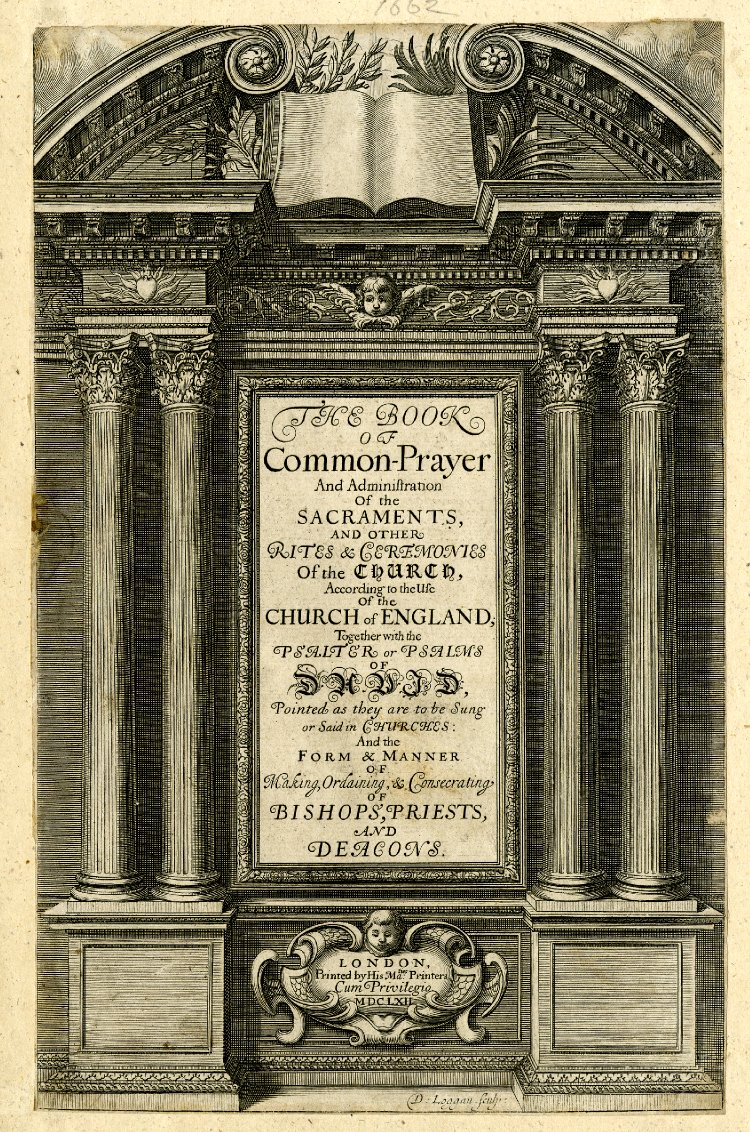
The 1662 Book of Common Prayer, which Davidson sought to update

The historian Matthew Grimley describes the prayer-book controversy of 1927–28 as "the last great parliamentary battle over Church and state". Davidson – like his Tudor predecessor Thomas Cranmer, according to The Times – had "immense and perhaps excessive faith in a new Prayer-book as a means of composing differences and restoring discipline within the Church". He also considered that a modern Prayer-book would enrich Anglican services and make them relevant to 20th-century needs unforeseen when Cranmer and his colleagues wrote the original version in the 16th century. (Note: The original 1549 version edited by Cranmer had been lightly revised several times in the 16th and 17th centuries; the one in use in Davidson's time, largely based on the original Tudor text, dated from 1662.) Work had been going on under his supervision since 1906, and in 1927 a version was finally ready. The Church Assembly approved it, and it was put to Parliament for authorisation. The House of Lords agreed it by an unexpectedly large majority of 241 votes. The measure then went before the House of Commons, where it was introduced by William Bridgeman, who made a listless speech that did not impress MPs. Opposing, William Joynson-Hicks spoke vehemently, maintaining that the new Prayer-book opened the door to Romish practices. Davidson privately wrote of Bridgeman's speech, "He absolutely muffed it. It was a poor speech with no knowledge and no fire"; Bell calls Joynson-Hicks's speech "flashy" but "abundantly successful". The Commons rejected the bill by 238 votes to 205. The MP Austen Chamberlain described Davidson as "a tragically pathetic figure as he left ... after the result". The Times said:

Few people, whether they desired a revised Prayer-book or not, failed to sympathize with the Archbishop in his personal disappointment, or to regret that the 25 years of his Primacy should not have ended with what must have seemed its crowning achievement.

A second attempt the following year was voted down in the Commons on 14 June 1928. After that defeat Davidson told the Church Assembly:

It is a fundamental principle that the Church – that is, the Bishops together with the Clergy and the Laity – must in the last resort, when its mind has been fully ascertained, retain its inalienable right, in loyalty to our Lord and Saviour Jesus Christ, to formulate its Faith in Him and to arrange the expression of that Holy Faith in its forms of worship.

This statement had the unanimous approval of the bishops. Some of Davidson's colleagues felt that Parliament's rejection of the Prayer-book would have grave consequences. William Temple, his successor-but-one at Canterbury, wrote that "some sort of disestablishment is (I suppose) the necessary result"; Henson, previously a strong supporter of establishment, now began to campaign against it. The historian Adrian Hastings writes that "by adroitness of manoeuvre and delay" Davidson led his fellow bishops away from such a drastic outcome.

=== Retirement ===
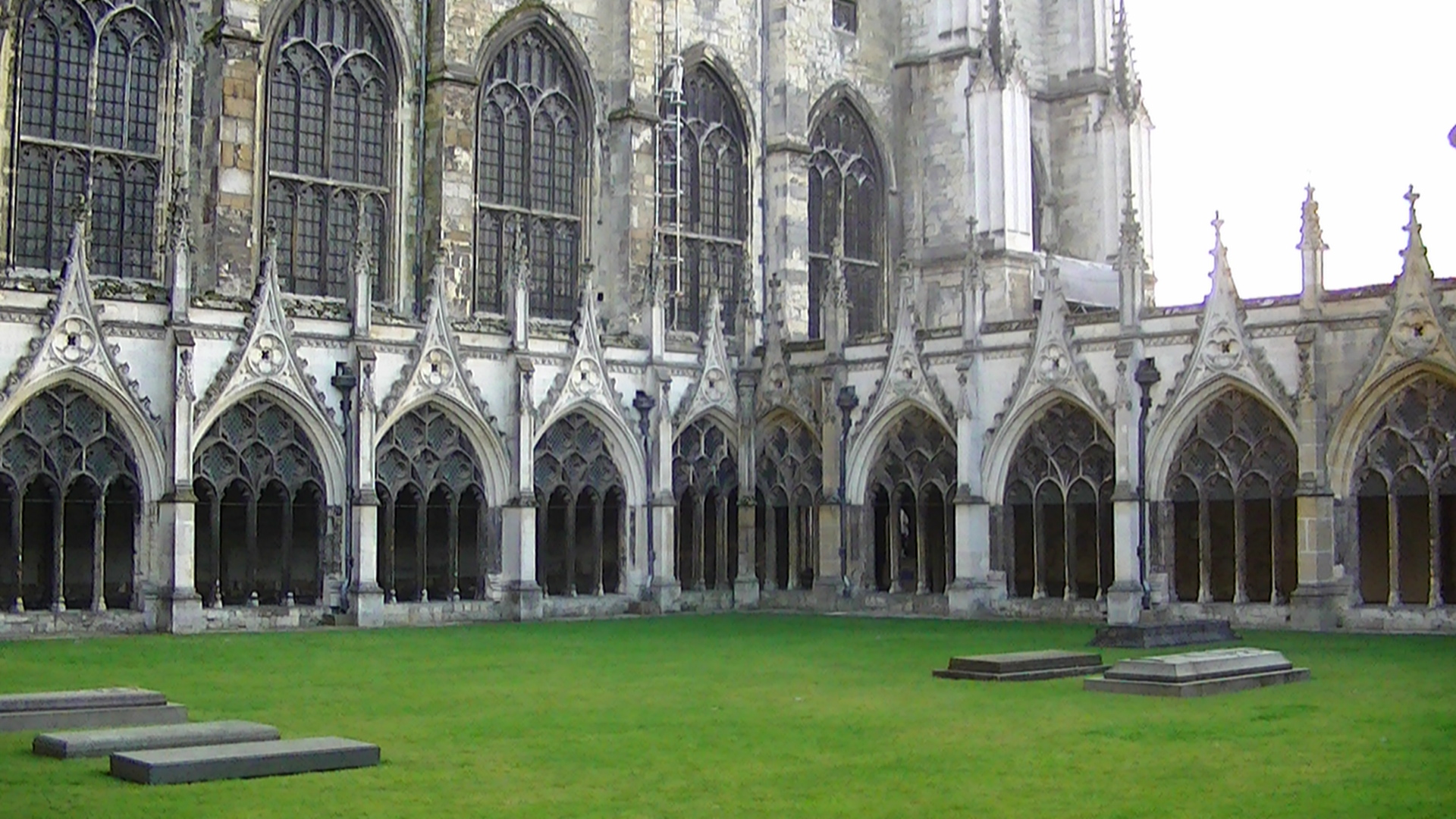
Cloister of Canterbury Cathedral

In June 1928 Davidson announced his retirement, to take effect on 12 November. He had served as Archbishop of Canterbury for longer than anyone since the Reformation. He was the first holder of the post to retire, (Note: Several earlier Archbishops were deposed or deprived of their sees – Byrhthelm, Robert of Jumièges, Stigand, Roger Walden, Thomas Cranmer and William Sancroft – but Davidson was the first to retire voluntarily in old age.) and to deal with this unprecedented event the King appointed a four-man commission to accept Davidson's formal resignation. (Note: The commissioners were the Archbishop of York (Cosmo Lang) and the Bishops of London, Durham and Winchester (respectively, Arthur Winnington-Ingram, Hensley Henson and Theodore Woods.) On his retirement he was created Baron Davidson of Lambeth, and was introduced in the House of Lords on 14 November by Lord Harris and Lord Stamfordham. After leaving Lambeth Palace, Davidson moved to a house in Cheyne Walk, Chelsea. He died there on 25 May 1930, aged 82. The Dean of Westminster offered interment in Westminster Abbey, but Davidson had made it known that he hoped to be buried at Canterbury, and his wishes were followed. He was buried on 30 May in the cloister of Canterbury Cathedral, opposite the Chapter House. His widow died in June 1936, and was buried with him.

== Honours ==
Davidson's honours and appointments included: Prelate of the Order of the Garter (1895–1903); Knight Commander of the Royal Victorian Order (1902); Privy Counsellor (1903); Knight Grand Cross of the Royal Victorian Order (1904); Royal Victorian Chain (1911); Grand Cross of the Royal Order of the Saviour (Greece, 1918); Grand Cordon de l'Ordre de la Couronne (Belgium, 1919); Order of Saint Sava, First Class (Serbia, 1919); and Freeman of the City of London (1928).

Coat of arms of Randall Davidson
Notes While Davidson was serving as a bishop his arms would be displayed impaling those of the diocese and topped by a mitre. Following his ennoblement they would be topped by the coronet of a baron. Escutcheon Azure, on a chevron Or between two estoiles in chief and a pheon in base Argent a fleur-de-lys Gules.

== Reputation ==
Davidson commented to a friend in 1928, "If I was describing myself I should say I was a funny old fellow of quite mediocre, second-rate gifts and a certain amount of common sense – but that I had tried to do my best; I have tried – and I have tried to stick to my duty; but that is really all there is about it." Historians have rated him more highly, although in a 2017 study, Michael Hughes comments that Davidson has "largely slipped from public memory, and perhaps even from that of the Church", his reputation eclipsed by successors such as William Temple or Michael Ramsey whose public profiles were considerably higher. Hastings calls him "perhaps the most influential of churchmen", because he was "a man of remarkable balance of judgment, intellectual humility, sense of responsibility and capacity for work ... His great sense of public moral responsibility gave him an influence and a position which were remarkable". The historian Keith Robbins observes that Davidson "did not attempt to resolve differences of outlook and doctrine at an intellectual level. The Church of England had always contained many mansions and it was his task to prevent the sinking of this particular bark of Christ by one faction or another. He was, on the whole, remarkably successful in a sober, uninspiring way". In a 1966 study of the Church of England, Roger Lloyd writes:

As the years pass by one has less and less desire to quarrel with the judgement that Davidson was one of the two or three greatest of all the Archbishops of Canterbury. If towards the end of his years the firmness of his grasp faltered a little, as it seemed to do over the matter of the Revised Prayer Book, he had nevertheless raised his high office to a pinnacle of eminence and a height of authority which it had never before known.

Bell's conclusion is that Davidson "immensely increased the influence of the Anglican communion in Christendom, and he saw the Church of England taking far more of a world view than it had taken previously". Bell adds:

His own personal hold on the affection of Church people grew steadily. ... In his general policy he pursued a middle course; and he was often criticized for not giving a clear enough lead, and for being too ready to wait on circumstances. His capacities were essentially those of a chairman, and a chairman of extraordinary fairness. He was a most able administrator, while at the same time a man of great simplicity of character, and this won him the friendship and trust of men of widely different points of view.

Mews's summary is:

Davidson's achievement was to maintain the comprehensiveness of the Church of England and to ensure liberty of thought. He maintained a Christian vision in British society at a time when international and class conflict could have obliterated institutional religion. Davidson's great skill was as a chairman, where he usually managed to secure unanimity ... For nearly fifty years he exercised more influence in Anglican affairs than anyone else.

== Notes, references and sources ==
=== Sources ===
==== Books ====
- Barber, Melanie (1999). "Randall Davidson: A Partial Retrospective". In Stephen Taylor (ed.). From Cranmer to Davidson: A Church of England Miscellany. Woodbridge: Boydell. ISBN 978-0-85115-742-9.
- Begbie, Harold (1922). Painted Windows; Studies in Religious Personality. New York and London: Putnam. OCLC 65931294.
- Bell, George (1935). Randall Davidson: Archbishop of Canterbury, Volume I. London: Oxford University Press. OCLC 896112401.
- Bell, George (1935). Randall Davidson: Archbishop of Canterbury, Volume II. London: Oxford University Press. OCLC 896112401.
- Bradley, Ian (1996). The Complete Annotated Gilbert and Sullivan. Oxford: Oxford University Press. ISBN 978-0-19-816503-3.
- Brown, Callum G. (2014). Religion and Society in Twentieth-Century Britain. London: Routledge. ISBN 978-1-138-14798-0.
- Bruce, Alex (2000). The Cathedral "Open and Free": Dean Bennett of Chester. Liverpool Historical Studies. Liverpool: Liverpool University Press. OCLC 994453174.
- Butt, John (2015). "General Strike, 1926". In John Cannon (ed.). Oxford Companion to British History. Oxford: Oxford University Press. ISBN 978-0-19-967783-2.
- Carpenter, Edward (1997). Cantuar: The Archbishops in Their Office. London: A. & C. Black. ISBN 978-0-264-67449-0.
- Chapman, Mark (2018). Theology at War and Peace: English Theology and Germany in the First World War. London: Routledge. ISBN 978-1-138-38589-4.
- Collinson, Patrick (1979). Archbishop Grindal, 1519–1583: The Struggle for a Reformed Church. Berkeley: University of California Press. ISBN 978-0-520-03831-8.
- Dark, Sidney (1929). Archbishop Davidson and the English Church. London: Philip Allan. OCLC 931334619.
- Davidson, Randall; William Benham (1891). The Life of Archibald Campbell Tait, Volume II. London: Macmillan. OCLC 12561176.
- Gilbert, Martin (1972). Winston S. Churchill, Companion Volume III, Part 1: August 1914 – April 1915. London: Heinemann. OCLC 56393138.
- Gilbert, Martin (1977). Winston S. Churchill: Companion Volume IV, Part 2: July 1919 – March 1921. London: Heinemann. ISBN 978-0-434-13013-9.
- Grimley, Matthew (2010). Citizenship, Community and the Church of England. Oxford Historical Monographs. Oxford: Oxford University Press. ISBN 978-0-19-927089-7.
- Hastings, Adrian (1986). A History of English Christianity, 1920–1985. London: Collins. ISBN 978-0-00-627041-6.
- Henson, Hensley (1943). Retrospect of an Unimportant Life, Volume 2, 1920–1939. London: Oxford University Press. OCLC 504487878.
- Hughes, Michael (2017). Archbishop Randall Davidson. London: Routledge. ISBN 978-1-4724-1866-1.
- Jacobs, Alan (2019). The Book of Common Prayer: A Biography. Princeton: Princeton University Press. ISBN 978-0-691-19178-2.
- Lee, Arthur (1974). Alan Clark (ed.). A Good Innings: The Private Papers of Viscount Lee of Fareham. London: John Murray. ISBN 978-0-7195-2850-7.
- Lloyd, Roger (1966). The Church of England, 1900–1965. London: SCM Press. OCLC 923343620.
- Machin, G. I. T. (1998). Churches and Social Issues in Twentieth-Century Britain. Oxford: Clarendon Press. ISBN 978-0-19-821780-0.
- Marshall, William M. (2015). "Davidson, Randall". In John Cannon (ed.). Oxford Companion to British History. Oxford: Oxford University Press. ISBN 978-0-19-967783-2.
- Martell, J. D. (1974). The Prayer Book Controversy 1927–28 (Masters). Durham: Durham University. OCLC 1015456607.
- Morris, J. N. (2016). The High Church Revival in the Church of England. Leiden and Boston: Brill. ISBN 978-90-04-32680-4.
- Peart-Binns, John Stuart (2013). Herbert Hensley Henson – A Biography. Cambridge: Lutterworth Press. ISBN 978-0-7188-9302-6.
- Robbins, Keith (1993). History, Religion and Identity in Modern Britain. London: Hambledon Press. ISBN 978-1-85285-101-9.
- Roberts, Andrew (1999). Salisbury: Victorian Titan. London: Weidenfeld and Nicolson. ISBN 978-0-297-81713-0.
- Rose, Kenneth (2000). King George V. London: Phoenix. ISBN 978-1-84212-001-9.
- Rumble, Alexander (2012). Leaders of the Anglo-Saxon Church: From Bede to Stigand. Woodbridge: Boydell Press. ISBN 978-1-84383-700-8.
- Smith, F. E. (Lord Birkenhead) (1924). Contemporary Personalities. London: Cassell. OCLC 61585163.
- Van Emden, Richard (2013). Meeting the Enemy: The Human Face of the Great War. London: A&C Black. ISBN 978-1-4088-3981-2.

==== Journals ====
- Quinault, Roland (February 1992). "Asquith's Liberalism". History. 77 (249): 33–49. doi:10.1111/j.1468-229X.1992.tb02391.x. JSTOR 24420531. (subscription required)

Church of England titles
Preceded by George Connor	Dean of Windsor; 1883–1891	Succeeded by Philip Eliot
Preceded by Anthony Thorold	Bishop of Rochester; 1891–1895	Succeeded by Edward Talbot
Preceded by Anthony Thorold	Bishop of Winchester; 1895–1903	Succeeded by Herbert Ryle
Preceded by Frederick Temple	Archbishop of Canterbury; 1903–1928	Succeeded by Cosmo Gordon Lang
Peerage of the United Kingdom
New title	Baron Davidson of Lambeth; 1928–1930	Extinct
