= Drakeford =

Drakeford is a surname. Notable people with the surname include:

- Arthur Drakeford (1878–1957), Australian politician
- Arthur Drakeford Jr. (1904–1959), Australian politician
- Geoff Drakeford (born 1991), Australian golfer
- Louis Drakeford (died 1952), Australian journalist and songwriter
- Mark Drakeford (born 1954), Welsh politician
- Richard Drakeford (1936–2009), British composer
- Tyronne Drakeford (born 1971), American football player
