= William Benham =

William Benham may refer to:

- William Benham (priest) (1831–1910), English churchman and writer
- William Benham (zoologist) (1860–1950), New Zealand zoologist and biologist
- William Gurney Benham (1859–1944), English newspaper editor
