= Benham =

Benham may refer to:

== People ==
- Benham (surname)

== Places ==
- Benham Park, Berkshire, England
- Benham, Indiana, an unincorporated community
- Benham, Kentucky, United States
- Benham Falls, a series of rapids in Oregon, United States
- Benham Plateau, also known as the Benham Rise

== Other uses ==
- USS Benham (DD-49), Aylwin-class destroyer
- USS Benham (DD-397), Benham-class destroyer
- USS Benham (DD-796), Fletcher-class destroyer
- Benham (automobile), an automobile produced in Detroit, Michigan from 1914 to 1917

== See also ==
- Marsh Benham, Berkshire, England
