= James Brash =

James Hamish Brash (1881 – 14 October 1961) was a Scots-born Australian pianist, organist and choral conductor, remembered as a composer and adjudicator at eisteddfods throughout Australia and New Zealand.

== History ==
Brash was born in Helensburgh, Scotland, and educated at the Hermitage School. He received musical instruction, possibly alongside Edgar Barratt (1877–1928), from a Dr Berry of Leipzig, and a Dr Healy of Oxford. He was organist at the Park Church, Helensburgh for over 21 years.

He arrived in Sydney in 1921 to take up an appointment as organist and director of the choir at Scots Church, Sydney. He became conductor of the choir of the Highland Society of New South Wales, possibly appointed before leaving Scotland. In May 1923 he was also appointed organist and choirmaster of St Clement's Church, Marrickville.

His compositions include:

- "Port o'Sydney" to words by William Tainsh, first sung by A. E. Yonge Benham at the latter's farewell in August 1922.
- "The Rising Sun"- Anzac anthem
- "Tam i' the Kirk" won an award in London, judged by Dr John Ireland, and was published by Frederick Harris.
- "Four individual songs for medium voice"
- "The Wicklow Lament" (of the convict Michael Dwyer)
- "O Men from the Fields"
- "Dance of the Columbine"
- "Beauty's Daughters"
- "Sing a Song of Sixpence"
- "Down by the Sally Gardens"

He made arrangements of

- Richard Strauss's "Liebeshymnus" c. 1897
- Massenet's opera Werther c. 1892
- Handel's Israel in Egypt for the Royal Philharmonic Society Concert at Sydney Town Hall, 1911

Some of his four-part vocal works were recorded by The Adelaide Singers, conducted by Norman Chinner.

== Other activities ==
Brash was a foundation member of APRA and the Music Teachers Association.

== Family ==
Brash married twice, to Dorothy Jane Matheson (1881 – 13 November 1926), by whom he had two children, secondly to the soprano Alice Prowse (1901–). She was a daughter of Inspector Joseph Prowse of the New South Wales Police Force.
