= Anthony Maxey =

Anthony Maxey (died 3 May 1618), was the Dean of Windsor.

== Life ==
Maxey was, according to the Oxford Dictionary of National Biography, probably from the Maxey family of Bradwell Juxta Coggeshall in Essex. He was educated on the foundation at Westminster School, whence he was elected to Trinity College, Cambridge, on 18 April 1578, and graduated B.A. in 1581, M.A. in 1585, B.D. in 1594, and D.D. in 1608, but he failed to obtain a fellowship at Trinity. James I, out of admiration for his florid pulpit eloquence and dislike of tobacco, made him his chaplain, and on 21 June 1612 appointed him dean of Windsor and register of the order of the Garter.

Maxey offered money to Sir Henry Hobart for preferment, and two months before his death made the highest bid for the vacant see of Norwich. He died on 3 May 1618, and was buried in the church of St. Martin-in-the-Fields, London, his wife having predeceased him without issue. By will he made liberal provision for his poor kinsfolk and servants, but "unto Roger my cooke, beinge verye lewde in his tongue, and besides corrupting my clarke, Roberte Berrye, with tobacco and drinckinge," he bequeathed nothing, "neyther in money nor mourninge cloke." He left his books, or as many as the authorities cared to take, to 'our publique library,' presumably that of the University of Cambridge.

== Works ==
Maxey published three sermons preached before the king, with the title The Churches Sleepe and The Golden Chaine of Mans Saluation, and the fearefull point of hardening, 3 pts. London, 1606; 3rd edit. 1607. Other editions, with additional sermons, were issued in 1610, 1614, 1619, and 1634.
