= Edith Davidson =

British clergy wife and moral welfare organiser

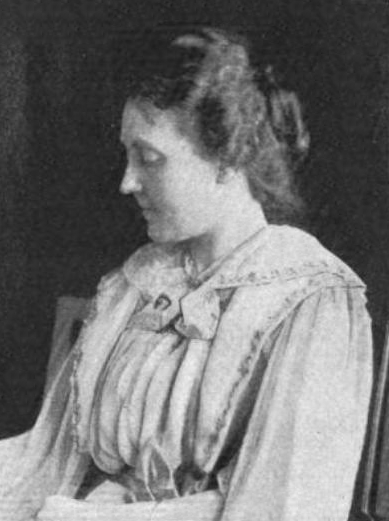
Davidson in c. 1903

Edith Murdoch Davidson, Lady Davidson of Lambeth (née Tait; 7 December 1858 – 26 June 1936) was a British clergy wife and moral welfare organiser. Her duties as the wife of a senior clergyman in the Church of England included dealing with his diary, handling correspondence and as acting as a hostess. In addition to this, she developed a special interest in helping so-called "fallen women", namely sex workers and single mothers. She organised and raised funds for rescue workers, associations and houses to help these women, while also campaigning to change Victorian attitudes and establish a single standard of sexual morality that applied to men and women equally. She chaired the Archbishops' Advisory Board for Spiritual and Moral Welfare Work from its establishment in 1917 until she retired in 1929. After her death, it was summarised that her "influence was wide but unobtrusive".

Edith was the daughter of Archibald Campbell Tait (1811–1882) and Catharine Tait (1819–1878). Her father was the Bishop of London at her birth and then Archbishop of Canterbury from 1869 until his death, while her mother was a philanthropist. She married Randall Davidson (1848–1930) in 1878: he was then her father's domestic chaplain but he would become a confidant of Queen Victoria as her private chaplain and rose to serve as Archbishop of Canterbury himself from 1903 to 1928. Randall had been shot in the lower back in an accident at school, leaving a hole the size of an orange and damaging his pelvis and surrounding muscles; he survived and learnt to walk again but lived with disabling consequences for the rest of his life. The couple did not have any children, and this was described in her biography as "one of the great tragedies of her life".
