= Dean of Windsor =

Position in the Church of England

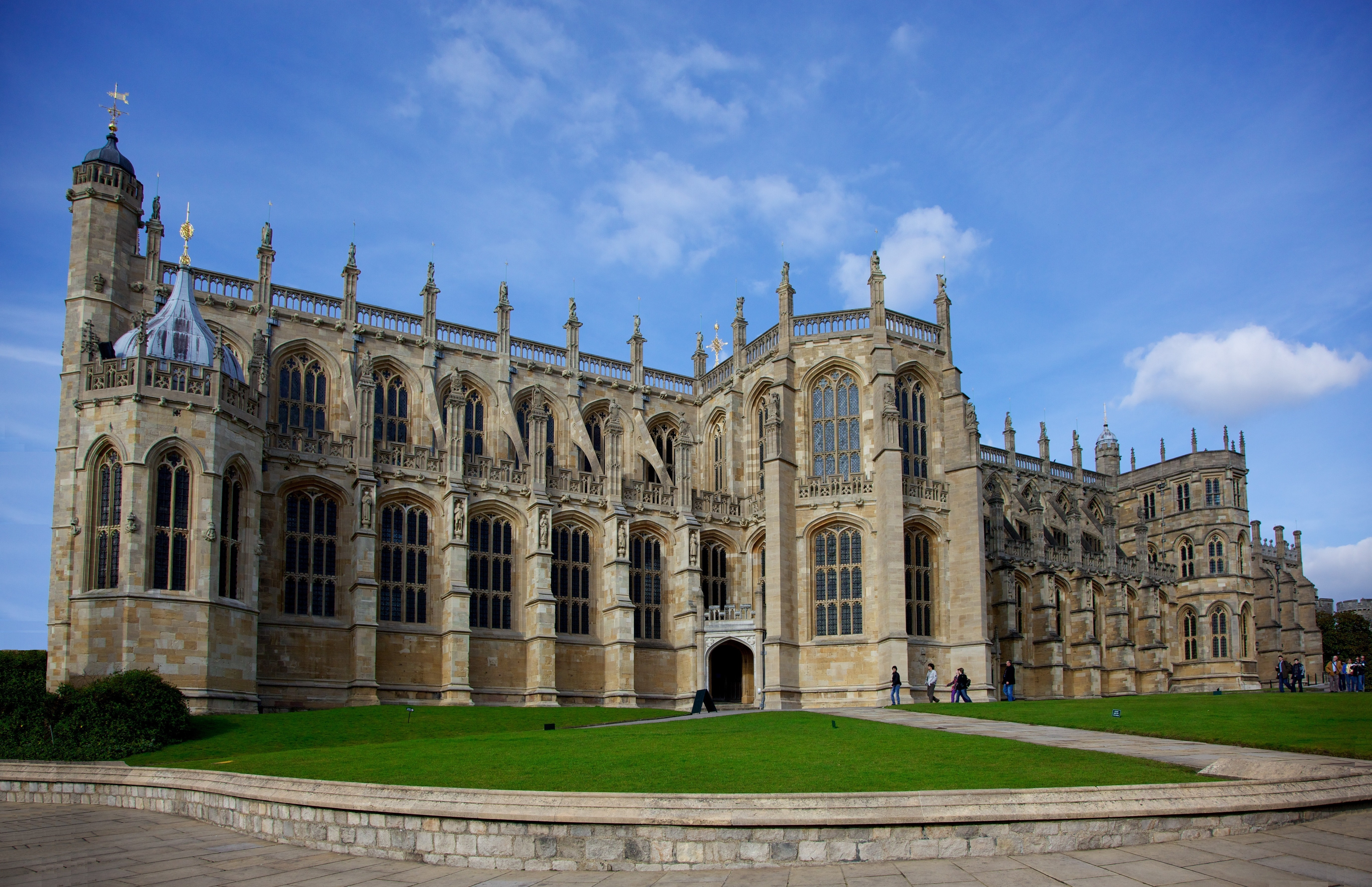
St George's Chapel, Windsor

The Dean of Windsor (formally the Dean of The King’s Free Chapel of St George, Windsor Castle) is the spiritual head of the canons of St George's Chapel at Windsor Castle, England. The dean chairs meetings of the Chapter of Canons as primus inter pares. The post of dean of Wolverhampton was assimilated to the deanery of Windsor, around 1480, until 1846.

== List of deans ==
=== Late medieval ===
- 1348 John de la Chambre
- 1349 William Mugge
- 1381 Walter Almaly
- 1389 Thomas Butiller
- 1402 Richard Kingston
- 1419 John Arundel
- 1454 Thomas Manning
- 1461 John Faulkes (Vaux)
- 1471 William Morland
- 1471 John Davyson
- 1473 William Dudley
- 1476 Peter Courtenay
- 1478 Richard Beauchamp
- 1481 Thomas Danett
- 1483 William Beverley
- 1485 John Davyson
- 1485 John Morgan
- 1496 Christopher Urswick

=== Early modern ===
- 1505 Christopher Bainbridge
- 1507 Thomas Hobbs
- 1509 Nicholas West
- 1515 John Vesey [alias Harman]
- 1519 John Clerk
- 1523 Richard Sampson
- 1536 William Franklyn
- 1553 Owen Oglethorpe
- 1556 Hugh Weston
- 1558 John Boxall (deprived)
- 1560 George Carew
- 1572 William Day
- 1596 Robert Bennet
- 1603 Giles Thomson
- 1612 Anthony Maxey
- 1618 Marco Antonio de Dominis
- 1622 Henry Beaumont
- 1627 Matthew Wren
- 1635 Christopher Wren
- 1659 Edward Hyde [not installed]
- 1660 Bruno Ryves
- 1677 John Durell
- 1683 Francis Turner
- 1684 Gregory Hascard
- 1709 Thomas Manningham
- 1709 John Robinson
- 1714 George Verney, 12th Baron Willoughby de Broke
- 1729 Peniston Booth
- 1765 Frederick Keppel
- 1778 John Harley
- 1788 John Douglas
- 1791 James Cornwallis
- 1794 Charles Manners-Sutton

=== Late modern ===
- 1805–1816 Edward Legge
- 1816–1846 Henry Hobart
- 1846–1854 George Neville-Grenville
- 1854–1882 Gerald Wellesley
- 1882–1884 George Connor
- 1884–1891 Randall Davidson
- 1891–1917 Philip Eliot
- 1917–1944 Albert Baillie
- 1944–1962 Eric Hamilton
- 1962–1971 Robin Woods
- 1971–1976 Launcelot Fleming
- 1976–1989 Michael Mann
- 1989–1997 Patrick Mitchell
- 1998–2023 David Conner
- 2023–present Christopher Cocksworth

== See also ==
- Dean and Canons of Windsor

== Sources ==
- Fasti Wyndesorienses: The deans and canons of Windsor. Historical monographs relating to St. George's Chapel, Windsor Castle Volume 8. Sidney Leslie Ollard (1950)
- British History Online – A History of the County of Berkshire: Volume 2 – Deans of Windsor
