= William Tainsh =

William Alexander Tainsh (1880–1967) was a Scots-born Australian storyteller and writer of popular verse.

== History ==
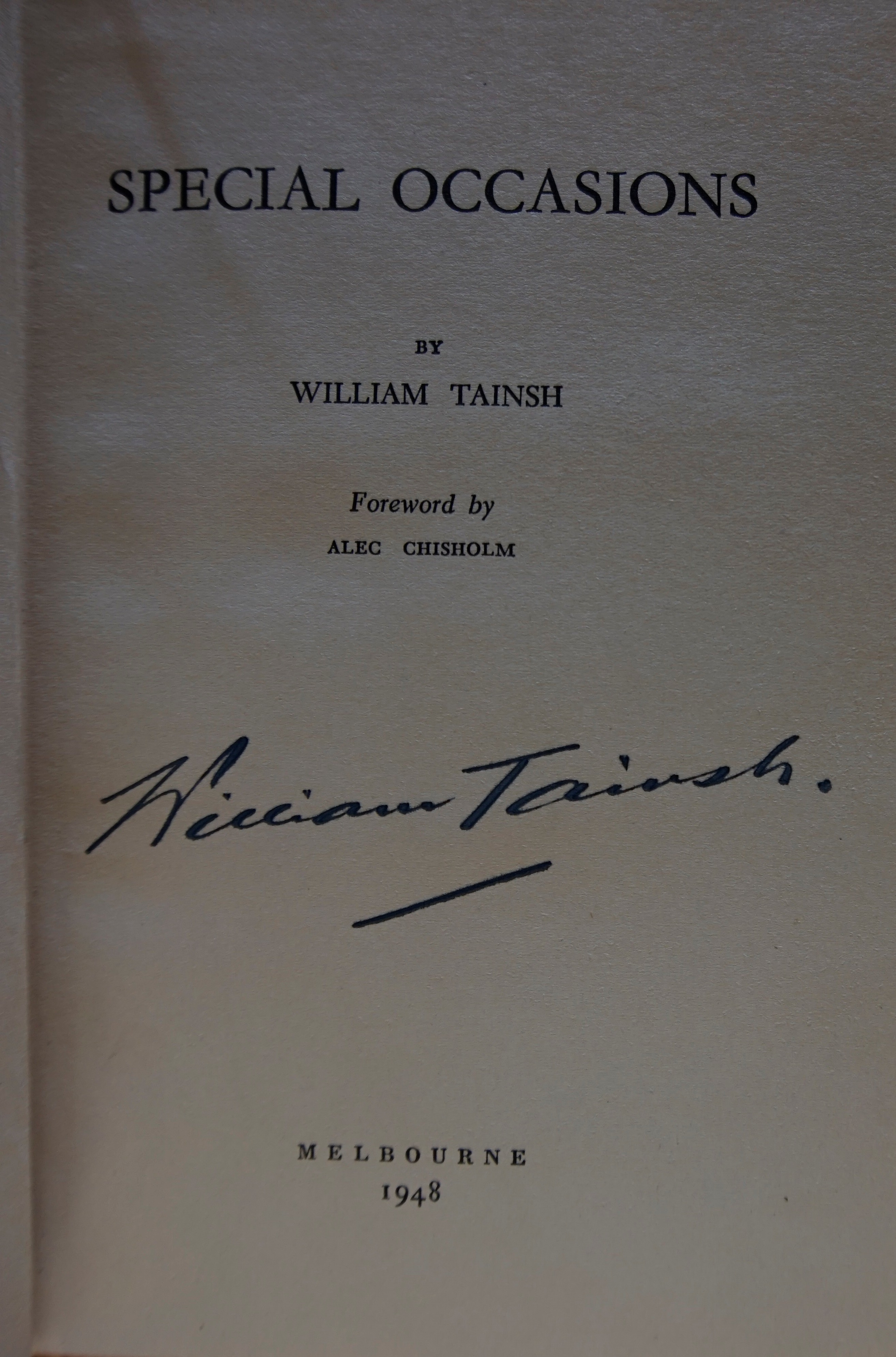
Title page, Special Occasions

Tainsh was born in Perthshire, Scotland and emigrated to Melbourne sometime around 1905 as Melbourne agent of the firm of John Dewar & Sons; His first mention in the Melbourne newspapers was in 1913 as singing at the Warrawee Club, hosted by Scots contralto Jessie Cromb. He sang to good effect at other concerts, but seemingly only in Scottish contexts. He later gained a reputation as congenial raconteur and repository of Scottish and Irish folklore.

He was a member of the Melbourne Savage Club and its secretary in 1916.

He was a popular lecturer and frequent broadcaster: his New Year's Eve programme on 3LO, redolent of Scottish customs and traditions, became a longstanding appointment. He became known Australia-wide: his talk on Glasgow humor, the Clyde Band and Broomielaw, was the subject of a national relay broadcast. Eventually he published some of his own songs and poems, which were praised for their clarity of thought and expression.

He wrote a piece that the Prime Minister of Australia, J. A. Lyons read to George V on the occasion of his (silver) Jubilee as monarch.

Australia — To His Majesty King George V.
Far carried o'er a world of troubled dawnings,
Comes with the rising thunder of a flood.
The loyal acclaim that pours today full-throated
From all the scattered children of the blood.
Though majesty and might and proud dominion
Be blazoned on the flag we raise above,
Enwoven warp and woof within its fabric
There runs, bright-hued, the silken thread of love.

Our Sovereign Lord, the years of your high labors
Have held scant measuring of sunlit days;
So, for your splendid bearing in the shadows
Yours be the greater love, the greater praise.
Head of our close-held family of nations.
King of the hearts of men in every land,
Across the seas that bind, but cannot sever
We proffer you our homage and our hand. (Note: As published in The Herald on 4 May 1935 and read by Tainsh over 3LO on the evening of 9 May 1935. It is likely Lyons read out the second verse only.)

== Selected works ==
- William Tainsh, James Brash (composer), "Port o' Sydney": song for baritone; Chappell & Co., Sydney (1922)
- William Tainsh, Louis Drakeford (composer), "The Invincibles": song; Allan & Co., Melbourne (1941)
- William Tainsh (1948) Special Occasions, Melbourne; poems, with foreword by Alec Chisholm
- William Tainsh (1948) The Visitor, Melbourne; "An inspiring poem with a message for everyone"

== Family ==
Tainsh married photographer Mina Moore on 20 December 1916. Their family includes:

- daughter (30 June 1918 – ) Margaret?
- Douglas Edward Tainsh (13 June 1921 – 30 Mar 2004) served in Borneo during WWII, married Alice Drysdale. Best known as a cartoonist, he created "Cedric" the swaggie in Australasian Post popular in the 1960s.

They had a home at 12 Northcote Ave, Caulfield in 1942.
