= Catharine Tait =

British philanthropist (1819–1878)

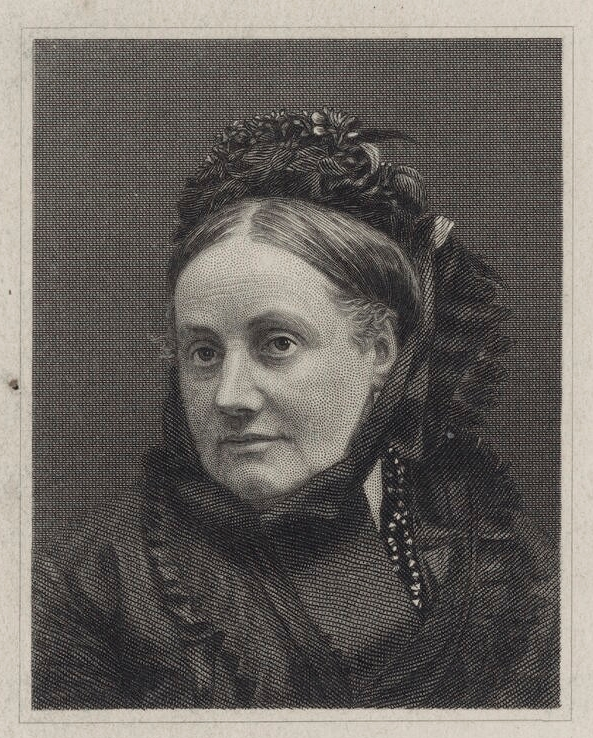
- Engraving of Tait published 1879
- Born: Catharine Spooner; 9 December 1819; Rugby, Warwickshire, England
- Died: 1 December 1878 (aged 58); Edinburgh, Scotland
- Occupations: Philanthropist and social activist
- Known for: Organising visits to workhouses
- Spouse: Archibald Campbell Tait
- Children: 9

Catharine Tait (née Spooner; 9 December 1819 – 1 December 1878) was a British philanthropist.

== Life ==
Tait was born in Elmdon near Rugby where her father was the rector. Her parents were Anna Maria and William Spooner.

She had opposed Archibald Campbell Tait when he applied to be the headmaster at Rugby School because of differences in their belief. He was appointed on 28 July 1842 and she married him in the same year. He became the disappointing successor to Thomas Arnold as headmaster of Rugby School. In fact Catharine was a great support to him and on her own account she helped the poor in the town and established a school for girls.

Her husband was appointed to the deanery of Carlisle in 1849. While she was in Carlisle she decided that it was her duty and she visited the local workhouse. Her experience was consulted when Louisa Twining formed the Workhouse Visiting Society with wider ambitions. Louisa's society gained a lot of momentum. Tait not only visited the workhouse but also the local school where she taught and in return she invited poor people to the deanery.

In 1856, within five weeks, five of their children died due to scarlet fever in 1856. Two were spared and in time they were joined by another two siblings (including Edith).

After her husband became the Bishop of London she had an idea of founding a Ladies Diocesan Association with the objective of bridging the gap between the rich and the poor. She was aware of the difficulties that had faced Twining's Workhouse Visiting Society which ceased operating in 1865. The Bishopric had rich parishes and poor parishes. In the poor parishes there may not be the staff to care for the most disadvantaged. Poor women had children and jobs and they could not donate their time whereas rich women had servants and leisure time. Tait's idea was to get the women of rich parishes to donate their time in poorer parishes and she proposed that aristocratic women would be invited to join the "LDA". The idea was launched by her husband on 27 February 1865, but it was Catharine's idea and the Bishop remembered this in his memoirs. She established a girl's orphanage and convalescent home at St Peter's, Thanet.

The Countesses of Darnley and Harrowby were assigned to visit the Whitechapel workhouse every week.

Tait died in Edinburgh in 1878.
