= Thomas Manning (priest) =

English archdeacon and dean

Thomas Manning (died c. 1469) was the Archdeacon of Totnes during 1453 and Dean of Windsor from 1455 to 1461.

== Career ==
Appointments:

- Vicar of West Thurrock, Essex
- Vicar of Gingrave, Essex
- Vicar of West Horndon, Essex
- Prebendary of Nassington in Lincoln Cathedral 1451 - 1463
- Archdeacon of Totnes 1453
- Treasurer of Salisbury Cathedral 1454 - 1462
- Prebendary of Colwall in Hereford Cathedral 1459 - 1462
- Prebendary of Holborn in St Paul's Cathedral 1459 - 1462
- Dean of Windsor 1455 - 1461

He lost his appointment as Dean of Windsor in 1461, following the Lancastrian defeat at the Battle of Towton in 1461. He was at dinner with King Henry VI at Myrton, near Clitheroe when he was betrayed and captured by the Yorkists in July 1466.
