= May and Mina Moore =

New Zealand sisters and photographers

May Moore
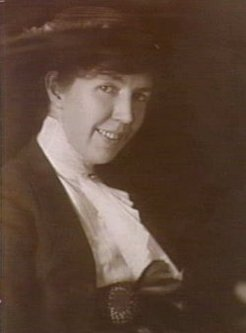
- Annie May Moore (1881-1931), by unknown photographer, 1900-15
- Born: Annie May Moore; 4 January 1881; Wainui, New Zealand
- Died: 10 June 1931 (aged 50); Pittwater, New South Wales, Australia
- Occupation: Photographer
- Spouse: Henry Hammon Wilkes
- Height: 183 cm (6 ft 0 in)

Mina Moore
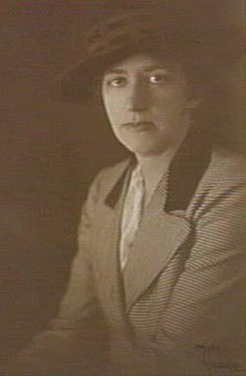
- Minnie Louise Moore (1882-1957), self-portrait
- Born: Minnie Louise Moore; 6 October 1882; Wainui, New Zealand
- Died: 30 January 1957 (aged 74); Croydon, Victoria, Australia
- Occupation: Photographer
- Spouse: William Tainsh

May and Mina Moore were New Zealand-born photographers who made careers as professional photographers, first in Wellington, New Zealand, and later in Sydney and Melbourne, Australia. They are known for their Rembrandt-style portrait photography, and their subjects included famous artists, musicians, and writers of the era.

== Early years and education ==
Annie May Moore (known as May) was born in Wainui, New Zealand, on 4 January 1881, and Minnie Louise Moore (known as Mina) was born the following year, on 6 October 1882. Their mother, Sarah Jane née Hellyer, was born in New Zealand, while their father, Robert Walter Moore, originally came from England. He was a farmer and sawyer.

May's talent for art was evident from early girlhood, and her mother encouraged her to study at the Elam School of Fine Arts in Auckland, New Zealand. Sometime in 1906 – 07, May began to earn money from her work, selling ink and pencil sketches at the New Zealand International Exhibition (1906) in Christchurch.

== In New Zealand ==
Mina, then a schoolteacher, began working with photography around 1907. Not long afterwards, the sisters decided to go into business as photographers. They bought Rembrandt Studio, where May had been working and in 1908 they advertised photography and sketch work. Since they did not know how to run a photography studio, the sisters initially kept on the staff, who trained May in camera operations and Mina in printing processes.

The sisters gained a solid reputation around Wellington within a short time. They became known for close-up, side-lit portraits shot against a plain background, and they worked with both sepia toning and bromide paper.

Their services were sought after by visiting performers such as Lily Brayton and New Zealand performers like Mākereti Papakura.

== In Australia ==
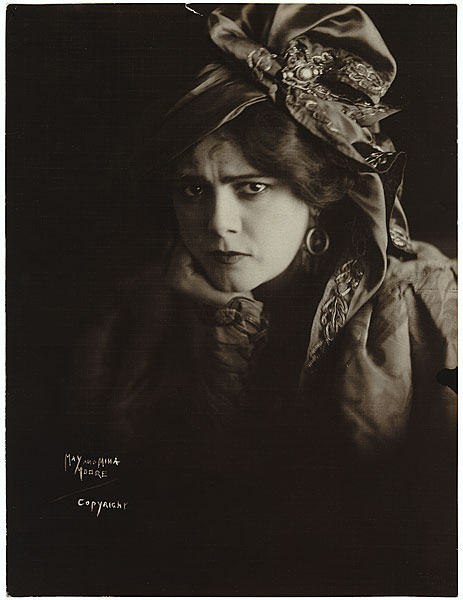
"Lily" Brayton, by May and Mina Moore, pub. 1916

After only a few years, the sisters moved their business to Australia, running separate studios in Sydney (1910–28) and Melbourne (1913–1918). May in Sydney continued to focus on studio portraits, while Mina in Melbourne moved into theatrical photography and portraits of interview subjects. Nonetheless, they continued to often cosign the work produced by their respective studios. Their photographs were frequently published in magazines such as Home and Triad.

Their styles were very consistent, and they used dramatic lighting to get the effect of making the subject's face the centre of attention.

=== May in Sydney ===
In 1910, May took a holiday trip to Australia that resulted in her opening a new studio in Sydney. One of May's notable images from the Sydney period was a portrait of cartoonist Livingston Hopkins.

May began writing articles for the Austral-Briton in 1916. In articles like "Photography for Women", she encouraged more women to take up the medium. Her advocacy extended to her own business, where she mostly employed women. One exception to this rule was her husband, Henry Hammon Wilkes, a dentist whom she married on 13 July 1915 and who gave up his dental practice to help his wife with her photography business.

May was a member of the Lyceum Club, the Musical Association of New South Wales, the Society of Women Painters (Sydney), and the Professional Photographers' Association of Australia.

Around 1928, May was forced into retirement by illness and turned her creative energies to painting landscapes. She died of cancer in her Pittwater home on 10 June 1931; her remains are at the Manly Cemetery. Six months after her death the Lyceum Club mounted a memorial exhibition of her work.

=== Mina in Melbourne ===
In 1913, Mina joined May in Australia, setting up shop in the Auditorium Building on Collins Street in downtown Melbourne and specializing in theatrical photography. Mina also formed an alliance with a freelance journalist, agreeing to photograph whomever the journalist planned to interview. These images were typically taken during the interview itself, affording a better opportunity to capture a subject's natural expressions.

Mina married William Alexander Tainsh on 20 December 1916. When their daughter was born in 1918, Mina retired from professional photography. Her Auditorium Building studio was taken over by photographer Ruth Hollick. She came out of retirement briefly in 1927, when Shell commissioned her to do a series of portraits. At that point she was working out of a home darkroom and caring for an expanded family, so after the Shell series she decided against restarting her photography business.

Mina died in Croydon, Victoria on 30 January 1957. Her remains were cremated.

Portraits of the stars by May and Mina Moore
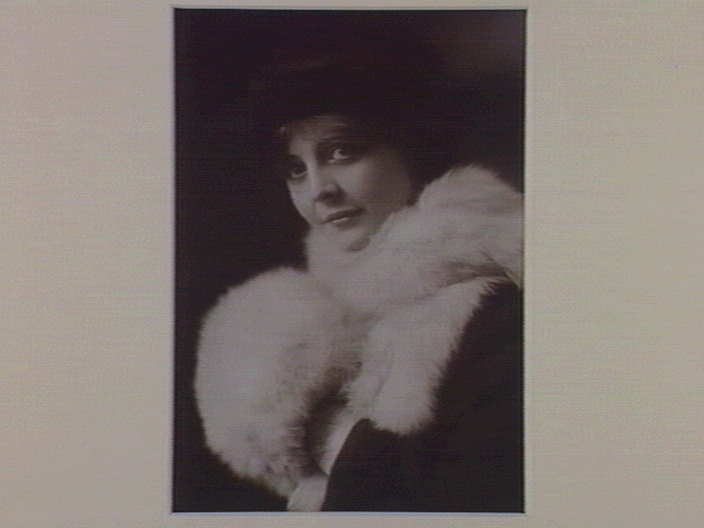
Enid Bennett

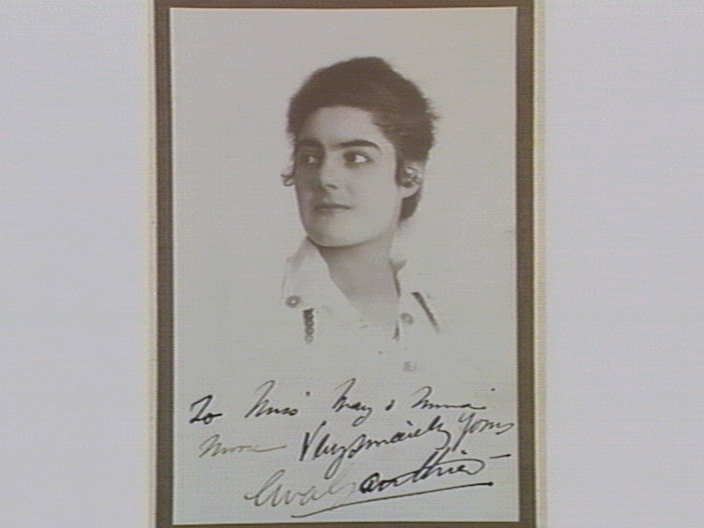
Eva Gauthier

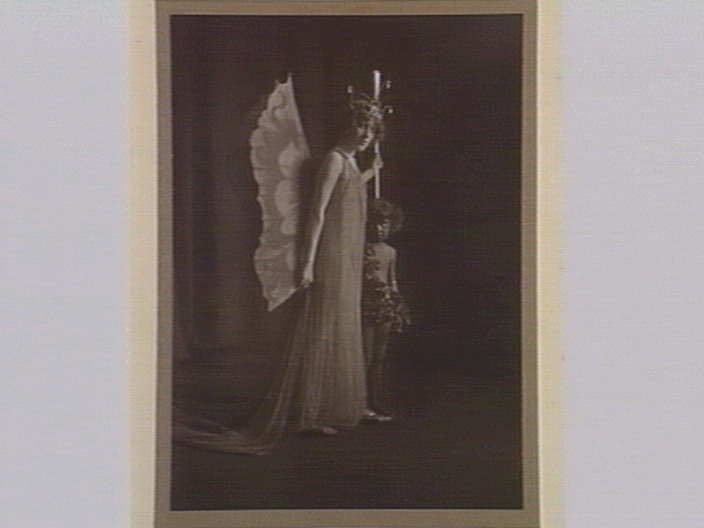
Lilian Birtles

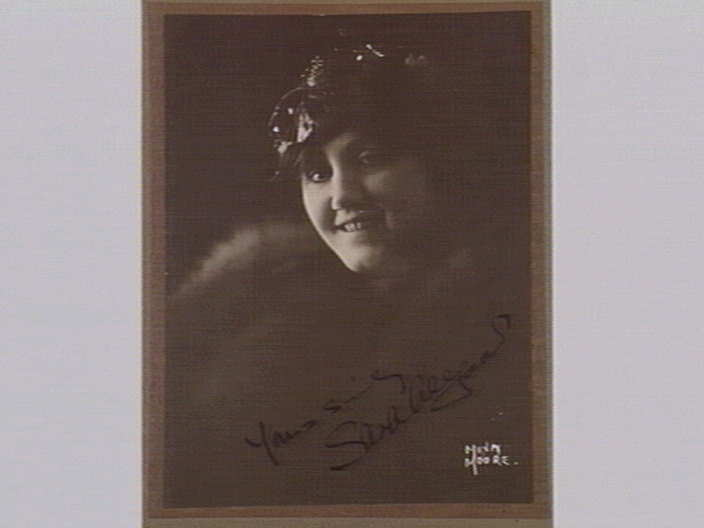
Sara Allgood

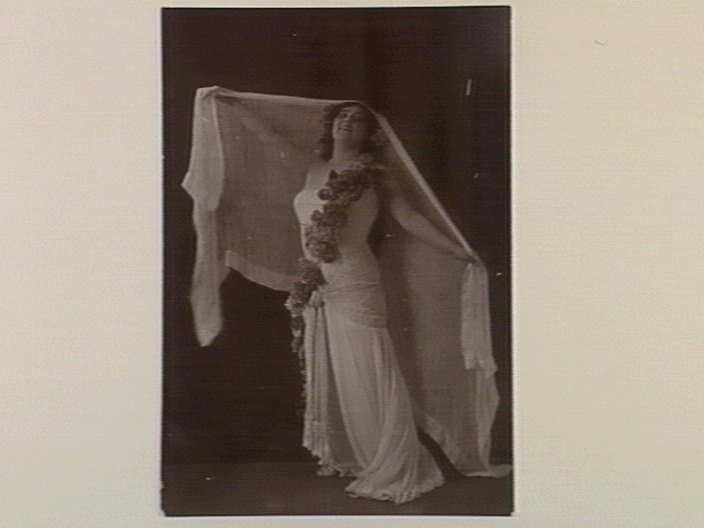
Eleanora de Cisneros
Images courtesy of May and Mina Moore Photography, State Library Victoria
