= Thomas Danett =

Thomas Danett (also spelt Danette; died 19 September 1483) was a Dean of Windsor from 1481 to 1483.

== Career ==
He was appointed:

- Principal of St Alban Hall, Oxford 1468–1477
- Prebendary of Henfield in Chichester 1472
- Rector of Brixton Deverill, Wiltshire 1469
- Rector of Slapton
- Prebendary of St Stephen's, Westminster
- Prebendary of Gaia Major in Lichfield 1473–1483
- Prebendary of Farendon c. Balderton in Lincoln 1480–1483
- Dean of Wolverhampton, a deanery united with Windsor, 1481
- Prebendary of Cherminster c. Bere in Salisbury 1482–1483
- Treasurer of St Paul's Cathedral 1479–1483
- Almoner to King Edward IV

He was appointed to the sixth stall in St George's Chapel, Windsor Castle in 1472 and held the canonry until 1481 when he was appointed Dean of Windsor.
