= Benham (automobile) =

Defunct American motor vehicle manufacturer

- Industry: Automotive
- Predecessor: S&M Motor Car Co.
- Founded: 1914
- Defunct: 1914
- Fate: Bankruptcy; Assets acquired by Puritan Mfg

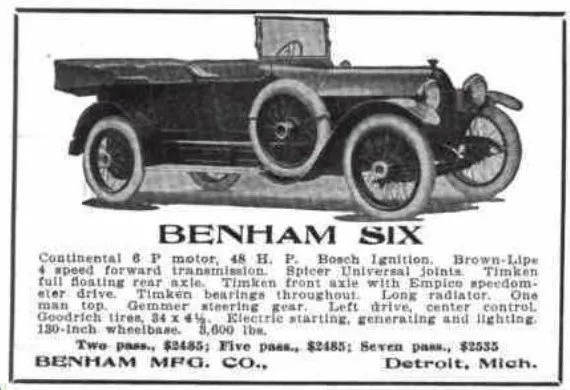
1914 Benham Six Touring

The Benham was an American automobile manufactured in Detroit, Michigan, by the Benham Manufacturing Company for 1914. Approximately 60 units were produced. Benham Manufacturing was the successor to the S&M (Strobel & Martin). The Canton Classic Car Museum in Canton, Ohio has an unrestored example of a Benham auto.

== History ==
In early 1914 it was announced that a company by the name of the Benham Manufacturing Company had been formed for the purpose of acquiring the assets of the former S&M company. In a receiver's sale Benham purchased the plant for $1850. The corporate offices were in New York and the company was managed by the Diamond-Warren Co. The Detroit offices were held at 1890 Mt. Elliot Avenue. George W. Benham was president.

There was a sales office in Havana with Walter D. Benham representing the brand there.

Later in 1914 the company creditor's committee suggested that the company should dissolve. The Union Trust Co. was appointed as the receiver. At the time of the filing Benham listed assets of $109,000 and liabilities of $76,889. By December of 1914 Puritan Mfg. acquired the assets of Benham. Major assets listed were "parts and materials" Puritan would maintain a department for a period of time dedicated to parts supplies for existing cars.

== The Benham Six ==
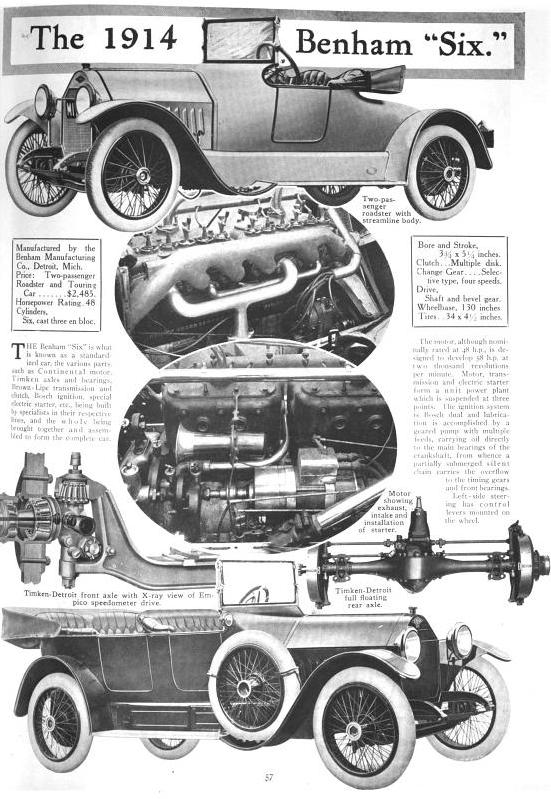
1914 Benham Six Advertisement

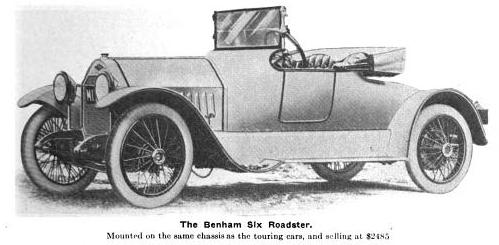
1914 Benham Six Roadster

The Benham Six was an assembled car (referred to by the company as a "standardized car"), which means that it used components from other manufacturers instead of making its own. The Six was powered by a Continental inline six making 48 horsepower. The cylinders were cast in two pairs. The transmission was a four speed by Brown-Lipe. Ignition was by Bosch, and the car was equipped with an electric starter and electric lights. All cars were left hand drive on a 130 inch wheelbase with wire wheels. Weight was 3500 pounds for the Touring car and 3400 pounds for the roadster. A five passenger, and seven passenger touring car were offered at $2485 and $2535 respectively. On the same chassis a roadster was offered at $2485. Advertising was limited, and most of the ads were dedicated to the technical aspects of the car, and very little space was dedicated to how the car was styled.
