= Archibald Campbell Tait =

Archbishop of Canterbury from 1868 to 1882

The Most Reverend and Right Honourable Archibald Campbell Tait
- Archbishop of Canterbury
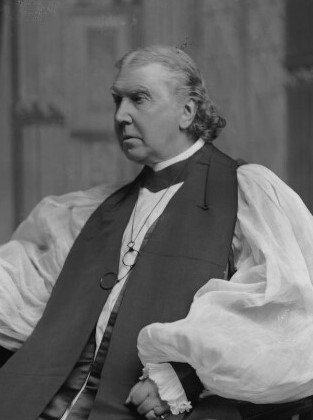
- Tait in the 1870s
- Province: Canterbury
- In office: 1868–1882
- Predecessor: Charles Longley
- Successor: Edward White Benson

Personal details
- Born: 21 December 1811 Edinburgh, Scotland
- Died: 3 December 1882 (aged 70) Addington, Surrey, England
- Buried: Church of St Mary the Blessed Virgin, Addington, London
- Spouse: Catharine Tait
- Children: 9

Academic background
- Education: University of Glasgow; Balliol College, Oxford

Academic work
- Institutions: Balliol College, Oxford
- Notable students: Arthur Penrhyn Stanley
- Main interests: Theology, classics

Archibald Campbell Tait (21 December 1811 – 3 December 1882) was an Archbishop of Canterbury in the Church of England and theologian. He was the first Scottish priest to become Archbishop of Canterbury and thus, head of the Church of England.

== Life ==
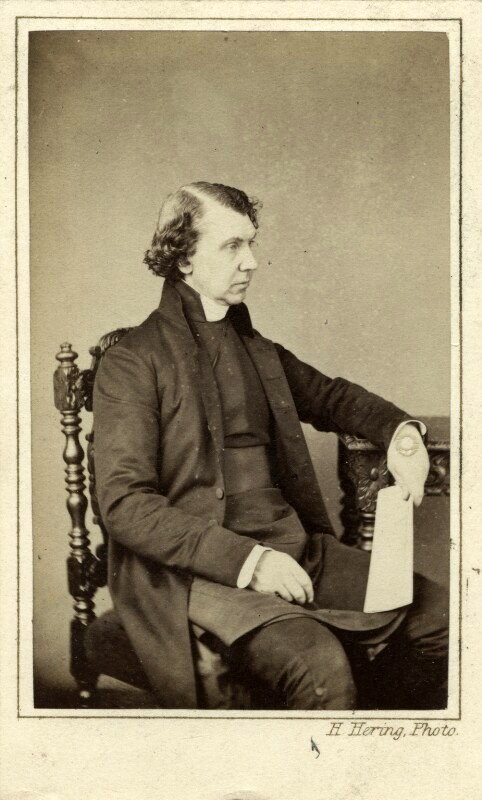
Archbishop Tait by Henry Hering.

Tait was born on Saturday, 21 December 1811, at 2 Park Place in Edinburgh, Scotland, the son of Crauford Tait WS of Harviestoun (1766–1832) and his wife, Susan Campbell (1777–1814) daughter of Ilay Campbell, Lord Succoth.

He was educated at the High School in Edinburgh and from 1824 at the newly completed Edinburgh Academy, where he was school dux 1826/7. His parents were Presbyterians but he early turned towards the Scottish Episcopal Church. He was confirmed in his first year at Oxford, having entered Balliol College in October 1830 as a Snell Exhibitioner from the University of Glasgow. He won an open scholarship, took his degree with a first-class in Literae Humaniores (classics) in 1833 and became a fellow and tutor of Balliol. He was ordained deacon in 1836 and priest in 1838 and served a curacy at Marsh Baldon.

Rapid changes among the fellows found him, at age 26, "the senior and most responsible of the four Balliol tutors." The experience gained during this period stood him in good stead afterwards as a member of the first Oxford University Commission (1850–52). He never sympathised with the principles of the Oxford Movement and, on the appearance of Tract 90 in 1841, he drafted the famous protest of the "Four Tutors" against it; but this was his only important contribution to the controversy. On the other hand, although his sympathies were on the whole with the liberal movement in the university, he never took a lead in the matter.

In 1842, he became an undistinguished but useful successor to Arnold as headmaster of Rugby School (one of his pupils was Lewis Carroll); and a serious illness in 1848, the first of many, led him to welcome the comparative leisure that followed upon his appointment to the deanery of Carlisle in 1849. His life there, however, was one of no little activity; he served on the University Commission, he restored his cathedral, and he did much excellent pastoral work. There, too, he suffered the great sorrow of his life. He had married Catharine Spooner at Rugby in 1843. She had opposed him becoming headmaster at Rugby because of differences in their belief, but she still married him. In fact Catharine was a great support to him and on her own account she helped the poor in the town and established a school for girls. In 1856, within five weeks, five of their nine children died due to virulent scarlet fever. Two were spared and in time they were joined by another two siblings.

Not long afterwards, he was consecrated Bishop of London on 22 November 1856 at the Chapel Royal, Whitehall, by John Bird Sumner, Archbishop of Canterbury, as successor to Charles James Blomfield. His translation to Canterbury in 1868 (he had refused the archbishopric of York in 1862) constituted a recognition of his work but made no break in it. His last years were interrupted by illness and saddened by the death in 1878 of his only son, Craufurd (1848–1878), and of his wife, Catharine (1819–1878). Five of his eight daughters also died in childhood. Tragically all died of scarlet fever in 1856, within a few days of each other.

== Notable accomplishments ==
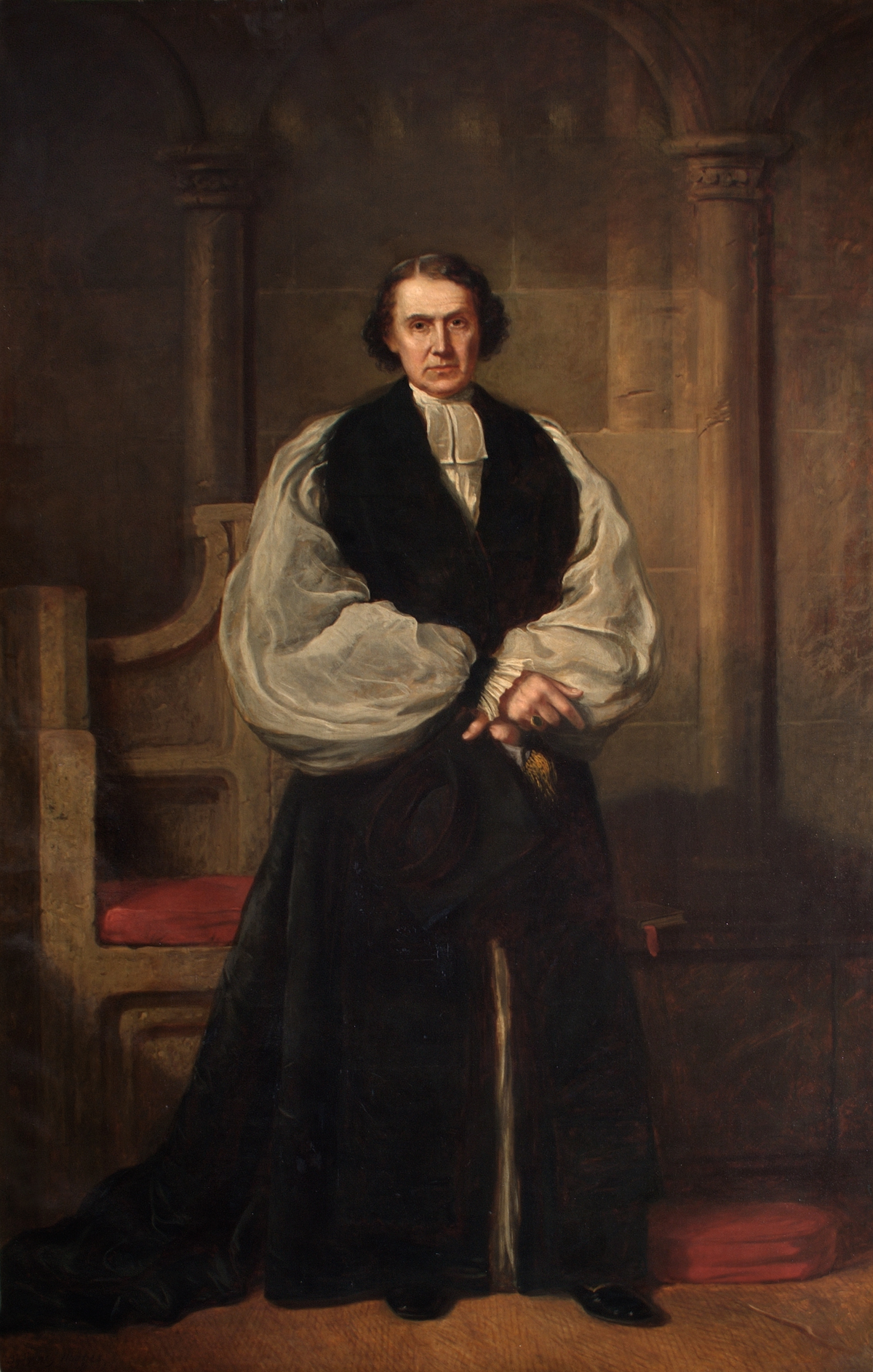
Archbishop Tait.

If Blomfield had almost remodelled the idea of a bishop's work, his successor surpassed him. Tait had all Blomfield's earnestness and his powers of work, with far wider interests. Blomfield had given himself zealously to the work of church-building; Tait followed in his steps by inaugurating (1863) the Bishop of London's Fund. He devoted a very large part of his time at London in actual evangelistic work; and, to the end, his interest in the pastoral side of the work of the clergy was greater than anything else. With his wife, he was instrumental in organising women's work upon a sound basis, and he did not a little for the healthful regulation of Anglican sisterhoods during the formative period in which this was particularly necessary. Nor was he less successful in the larger matters of administration and organisation, which brought into play his sound practical judgment and strong common-sense. He was constant in his attendance in parliament and spared no pains in pressing on measures of practical utility. The modification of the terms of clerical subscription (1865), the new lectionary (1871), the Burials Act (1880) were largely owing to him; for all of them, and especially the last, he incurred much obloquy at the time.

=== Dealings with liberalism ===
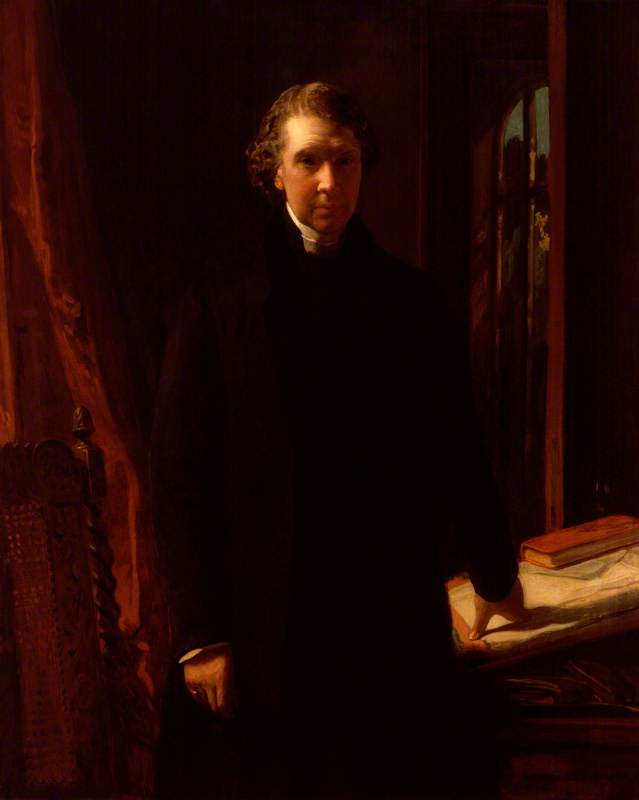
Archbishop Tait by James Sant, c.1865

With regard to the liberal trend in modern thought, he was in sympathy with it. His object in dealing with questions of faith, as in dealing with the ritual question, was primarily a practical one: he wished to secure peace and obedience to the law as he saw it. Consequently, after his sympathies had led him to express himself favourably towards some movement, he frequently found himself compelled to draw back.

He expressed a qualified sympathy with some of the writers of Essays and Reviews and then joined in the censure of it by the bishops (1861). The same kind of apparent vacillation was found in his action in other cases; e.g., in the case of John William Colenso (1863) and in the controversy as to the use or disuse of the Athanasian symbol (1872). It was naturally and widely misunderstood. Some who did not know him thought, or pretended to think, that he was a Socinian or a free-thinker. The world at large knew better; but even Frederick Temple warned him, in the case of Essays and Reviews, "You will not keep friends if you compel them to feel that in every crisis of life they must be on their guard against trusting you."

=== Dealings with the Oxford Movement ===
Illustration from Punch magazine, showing Archbishop Tait, trying to control the "Ritualist black sheep" with his crook called the "Public Worship Regulation Bill"

As regards Oxford Movement Catholic revival, Tait was concerned with it during the whole of his episcopate and, above all, on the issue of ritualism, on which it naturally came into most direct conflict with the recognised ecclesiastical practice of the day. He had to deal with the St George's-in-the-East protests, in 1859, and the troubles at St Alban's, Holborn, in their earlier stages (1867); he took part as assessor in the Privy Council judgment in the Ridsdale case (1877); he was more closely concerned than any other bishop with the agitation against confession in 1858 and again in 1877.

His method throughout was the same: he endeavoured to obtain a compliance to the law as declared by the courts; failing this, he made the most earnest efforts to secure obedience to the ruling of the Ordinary for the sake of the peace of the Church; after this, he could do nothing. He did not perceive how much of reason the "ritualists" had on their side: that they were fighting for practices which, they contended, were covered by the letter of the rubric; and that, where rubrics were notoriously disregarded on all hands, it was not fair to proceed against one class of delinquent only. In fact, if others were inclined to ignore it altogether, Tait could hardly realise anything but the connection between the English Church and the State. From such a position there seemed to be no escape but in legislation for the deprivation of the recalcitrant clergy; and the Public Worship Regulation Act 1874 was the result.

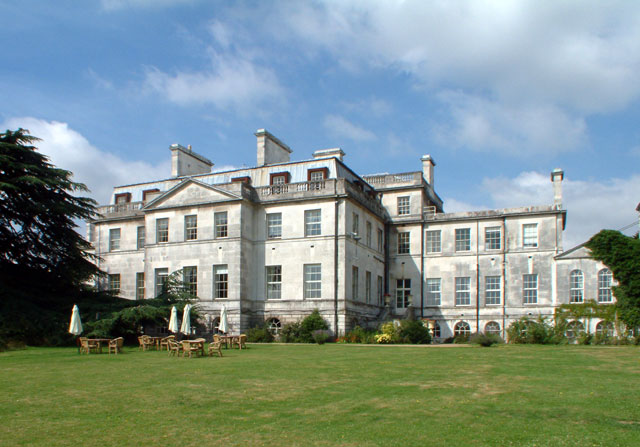
Addington Palace, the summer home of the Archbishops of Canterbury

For this Tait was by no means responsible as a whole: some of the provisions which proved most irksome were the result of amendments by Lord Shaftesbury which the bishops were unable to resist; and it must be borne in mind that the most disastrous results of the measure were not contemplated by those who were instrumental in passing it. The results followed inevitably: clergy were cited before a new tribunal, and not only deprived but imprisoned. A widespread feeling of indignation spread not only among High Churchmen, but among many who cared little or nothing for the ritual practices involved; and it seemed impossible to foretell what the outcome would be. But the aged archbishop was moved as much as anybody, and tried hard to mitigate such a state of things.

At length, when the Rev. AH Mackonochie was on the point of being deprived of his benefice of St. Alban's, Holborn, for contumacy, the archbishop, then on his deathbed at Addington Palace, took steps which resulted in the carrying out of an exchange of benefices (which had already been projected), which removed him from the jurisdiction of the court. This proved to be the turning-point; and although the ritual difficulty by no means ceased, it was afterwards dealt with from a different point of view, and the Public Worship Regulation Act became practically obsolete.

== Death and legacy ==
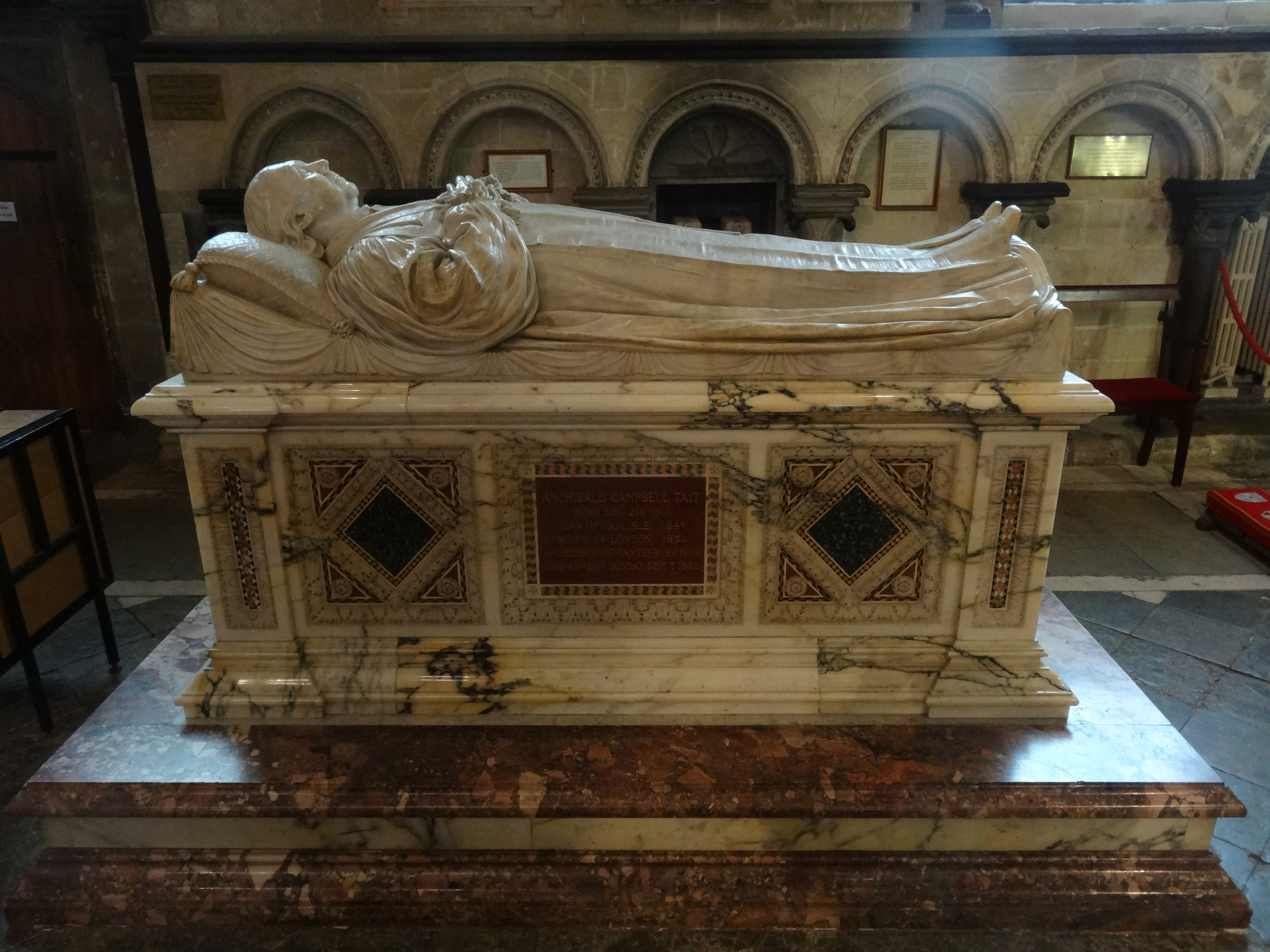
Archibald Campbell Tait's tomb in Canterbury Cathedral

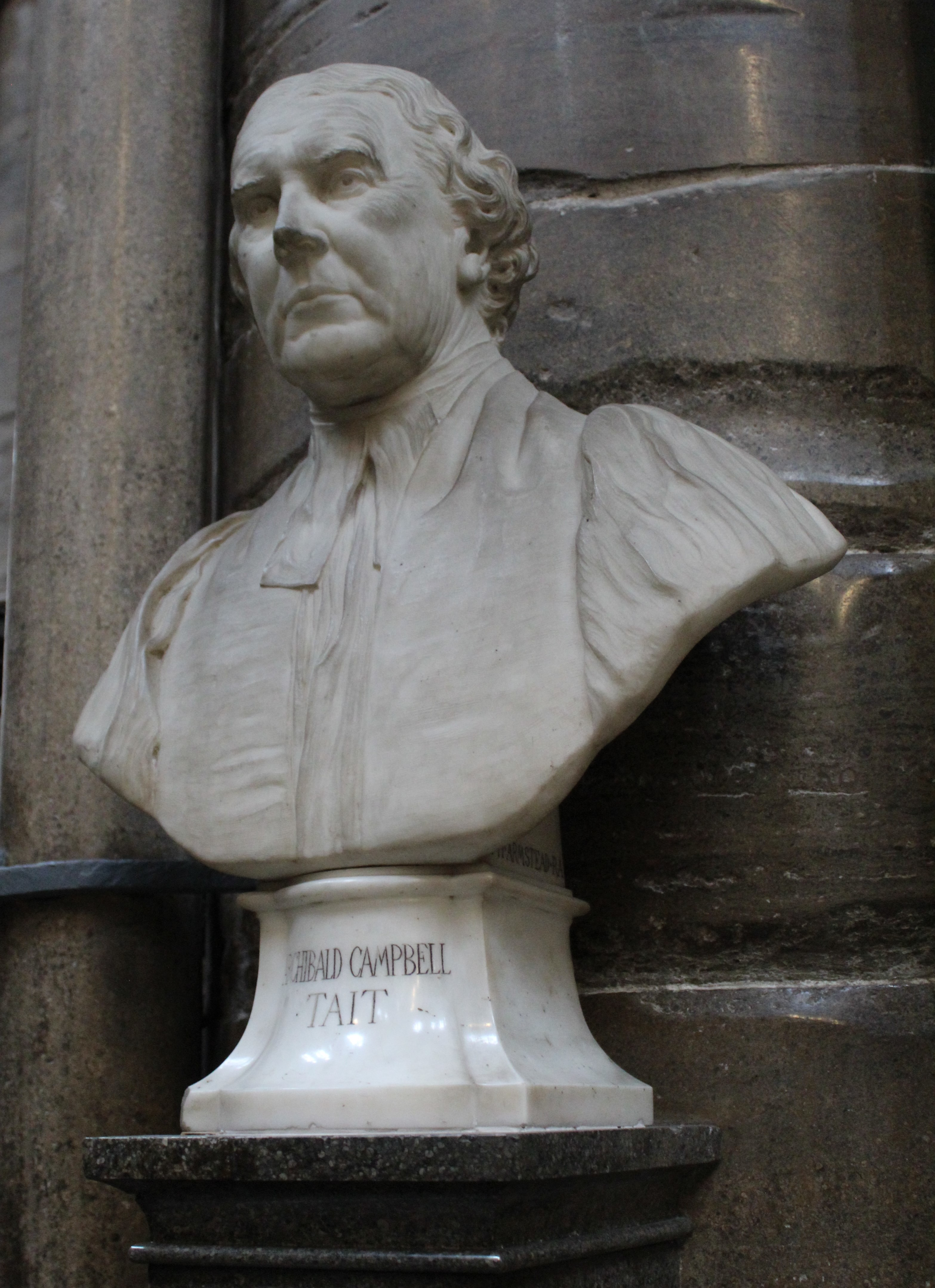
Bust of Tait, Westminster Abbey

Archbishop Tait died on 3 December (the first day of Advent) in 1882 at Addington, London. He is buried in the churchyard of St Mary the Blessed Virgin in Addington. The grave is marked by a large Gothic style Celtic cross on a stepped base and is by far the largest monument in the churchyard.

Tait was a Churchman by conviction; but, although the work of his life was all done in England, he remained a Scotsman to the end. It was the opinion of some that he never really understood the historical position of the English Church and took no pains to learn. John Tillotson, one of his predecessors in the archbishopric, was a favourite hero of his, and in some ways the two men resembled one another. Tait had none of Tillotson's gentleness, and he rode roughshod over the obstacles in his way. He cannot be called a great ecclesiastical statesman, but he administered his office well and was undoubtedly one of the foremost public men of his day.

His daughter Edith Murdoch Tait (1858–1936) married Randall Davidson who (partly due to Tait's influence) was later also Archbishop of Canterbury.

== Memorials ==
After his death, a stone monument with bronze bust was erected in Edinburgh, on the site of the house in which he was born, west of the University of Edinburgh's McEwan Hall on the rear of the Edinburgh Medical Faculty facing Teviot Row. The monument survives but is in a hidden location away from public roads.

His most important memorial stands in Westminster Abbey: a white marble bust by H. H. Armstead erected in 1884 in the south transept.

Addington Palace survives but was converted into use as a golf course in the 1930s.

== Works ==
- The Dangers and Safeguards of Modern Theology (1861)
- Harmony of Revelation and the Sciences (1864)

== Arms ==
Coat of arms of Archibald Campbell Tait

Notes
While serving as a bishop Tait's arms would be displayed impaled with the arms of the diocese and topped by a mitre.
Escutcheon
Quarterly 1st & 4th Argent a saltire and chief both engrailed Gules 2nd & 3rd Argent two crows paleways both transfixed through the neck by an arrow in fess Proper.

== Notes ==
Church of England titles
Preceded by Samuel Hinds	Dean of Carlisle; 1849–1856	Succeeded by Francis Close
Preceded by Charles James Blomfield	Bishop of London; 1856–1868	Succeeded by John Jackson
Preceded by Charles Longley	Archbishop of Canterbury; 1868–1882	Succeeded by Edward White Benson
