= George Connor (priest) =

Irish Anglican clergyman

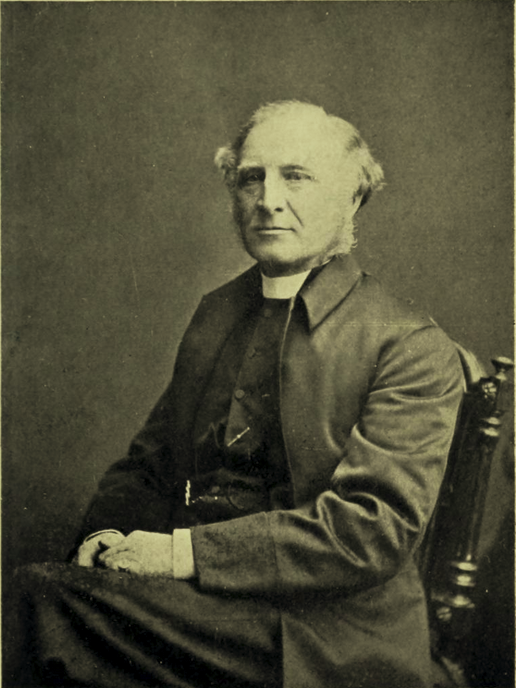
George Henry Connor

Rev. Canon George Henry Connor (21 December 1822 – 1 May 1883) was an Irish Anglican clergyman who became Dean of Windsor.

== Early life and education ==
Connor was born in Lucan, Dublin, the eldest son of George Connor, Master in Chancery in Ireland.

He was educated privately and at Trinity College, Dublin. He graduated BA in 1845 and proceeded MA in 1851.

== Career ==
Connor was ordained deacon in 1846 and priest in 1847. He officiated for a time at St Thomas's Chapel, Newport, Isle of Wight. He was then curate at St Jude's, Southsea then Wareham, Dorset, before returning to Newport as vicar in 1852, where his drive and initiative got the parish church rebuilt for £22,000 (with Prince Albert laying the foundation stone), a new vicarage and almshouses built, and local schools improved.

in 1877, Bishop Harold Browne appointed him Honorary Canonry in Winchester Cathedral, and Chaplain to the Governor of the Isle of Wight.

Developing a relationship with Queen Victoria, residing mainly at nearby Osborne House at this time, he became for many years her honorary chaplain and chaplain-in-ordinary, chaplain to the governor of the Isle of Wight, and official and commissary of the archdeaconry of Wight, culminating in his appointment as Dean of Windsor in October 1882 by the queen herself, without consulting Gladstone. Connor departed from Newport, to the parishioners' general regret, but proved unsuited to the pressures of such a prominent deanery as Windsor. His health rapidly failed (his presence at the christening of Princess Alice of Albany on 26 March 1883 took a great effort) and though he preached often in the private chapel, he only preached once in St George's Chapel before dying in office in 1883.

== Personal life ==
Connor married Catharine Maude Worthington in 1852, eldest daughter of John Worthington of Kent House, Southsea. The couple had a daughter, Emily Henrietta Maude, in 1853. His wife died giving birth to twin sons, George Harry Adams and Harry George Adams, in 1859. Their daughter married clergyman Ernest Roland Wilberforce.

He never remarried and died in 1882 at the deanery in Windsor Castle.
