= William Benham (priest) =

British churchman, academic and author (1831–1910)

William Benham (15 January 1831–30 July 1910) was a British churchman, academic and author.

== Early life ==
Born on 15 January 1831 at West Meon in Hampshire, where his father James Benham was postmaster, he was educated at the village school. Its founder, the rector Henry Vincent Bayley, made him his secretary, taught him Greek and Latin, and at his death left instructions that the boy's education should be continued.

Benham was sent in 1844 to St. Mark's College, Chelsea, recently established under Derwent Coleridge, to be trained as a schoolmaster. On completing his course he taught in a rural school, and was tutor to John Sebright between 1849 and 1852. With the support of Bayley's family he was able to attend the theological department of King's College, London, where his religious position was influenced by F. D. Maurice.

== Priest ==
In 1857 Benham was ordained deacon, and priest in 1858. He was appointed divinity tutor and lecturer in English literature at St. Mark's, Chelsea, still under Coleridge. He remained there until in 1865 he became editorial secretary to the Society for Promoting Christian Knowledge. At the same time he engaged in Sunday ministerial work as curate of St. Lawrence Jewry, under Benjamin Morgan Cowie. From 1866 to 1871 he was also professor of modern history at Queen's College, Harley Street, in succession to Maurice.

Benham's preaching attracted the attention of Archbishop Charles Longley, who made him in 1867 first vicar of his local parish of Addington, where the archbishop resided. Longley was in poor health: Benham acted as his private secretary during the period of the first Lambeth Conference in 1867, and was with him at his death in 1868. Longley's successor Archibald Campbell Tait gave him the Lambeth degree of B.D., made him one of the six preachers of Canterbury, and in 1872 gave him the vicarage of Margate.

In Margate Benham restored the parish church, and was chairman of the first school board of the town. In 1880 Tait made him vicar of Marden and in 1882 he was appointed rector of St. Edmund the King with St. Nicholas Acons, Lombard Street, a post he held for life. In 1888 Archbishop Edward White Benson made him honorary canon of Canterbury, and in 1898 Hartford University, U.S.A., granted him the degree of D.D. He was Boyle lecturer in 1897, and rural dean of East City from 1903 till his death.

== Death ==
Benham died of heart failure on 30 July 1910, and was buried at Addington.

== Work ==
Benham was a prolific writer. The Life of Archbishop Tait (1891), with Randall Davidson, was the major work of his later life. He also edited the memoirs of Catherine and Craufurd Tait, the wife and son of the archbishop (1879; abridged edit. 1882). His other main works were:

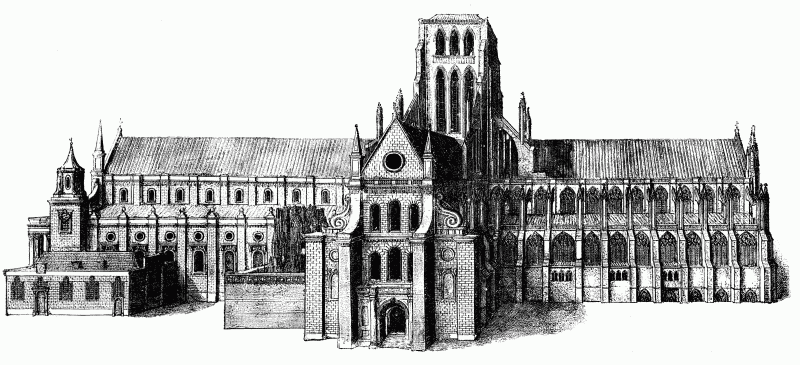
Engraving from Old St. Paul's Cathedral by William Benham, 1902

- The Gospel According to St. Matthew … with Notes, 1862.
- The Epistles for the Christian Year with Notes, 1865.
- The Church of the Patriarchs, 1867.
- A Short History of the Episcopal Church in the United States, 1884.
- Winchester (in "Diocesan Histories" series), 1884.
- Sermons for the Church's Year, Original and Selected, 2 vols. 1883–4.
- The Dictionary of Religion: An Encyclopædia of Christian and Other Religious Doctrines, ... Terms, History, Biography, 1887; reissued 1891, begun by John Henry Blunt.
- Winchester Cathedral, 1893; illustrated, 1897.
- Rochester Cathedral, 1900 (both of these in "English Cathedrals" series).
- Mediæval London, 1901 and 1911, with Charles Welch.
- Old St. Paul's Cathedral, 1902.
- The Tower of London, 1906 (all three of these in the "Portfolio Monographs").
- St. John and His Work ("Temple" series of Bible handbooks), 1904.
- Old London Churches, 1908.
- Letters of Peter Lombard, 1911, posthumous, with a preface by Randall Davidson. Benham had written miscellaneous paragraphs in the Church Times headed "Varia", and signed "Peter Lombard".

Benham produced an edition of William Cowper's poetry in 1870; published in 1873 a Companion to the Lectionary (new edition 1884); and translated The Imitation of Christ (1874; new ed. 1905). He edited the reprint series Ancient and Modern Library of Theological Literature. Lombard Street in Lent (1894), addresses by various preachers, presented the kind of sermon which he thought a City church should supply to attract businessmen in their lunch hour.

== Family ==
Benham was twice married:

1. to Louisa, daughter of Lewis Engelbach, by whom he had three daughters;
2. to Caroline, daughter of Joseph Sandell of Old Basing, Hampshire, who survived him.

== Notes ==
Attribution

This article incorporates text from a publication now in the public domain: Lee, Sidney, ed. (1912). "Benham, William". Dictionary of National Biography (2nd supplement). Vol. 1. London: Smith, Elder & Co. VIAF 28109533
