= Louis Drakeford =

Australian journalist, writer and songwriter

Louis Henry Drakeford (1876 – November 1952) was an Australian journalist, author and songwriter. He was a brother of Labor politician Arthur Drakeford (26 April 1878 – 9 June 1957). He also wrote as Thomas Louis Drakeford.

== History ==
Drakeford was born in 1876 in Victoria, Australia, a son of jeweller Samuel Finch Drakeford (died 1933) and his wife Elizabeth Margaret Drakeford, née Josephs.

In his early days Drakeford lived in Sale, Victoria, Walhalla, Victoria, and Melbourne; sometime around 1900 moving to northern China, where he worked for 27 years, before moving to New York City, where he spent the rest of his life.

== Works ==
- "Hide and Seek" sung by Ada Crossley in 1896
- Music to "Hands Across the Sea" by Walter Watkins 1900
- (As Thomas Louis Drakeford) book Honky Tonk Girl, 1936.
- Music to William Tainsh's patriotic verse "The Invincibles" 1941

== Family ==
Drakeford married Margie; their children included Louis, Yvonne, and Elaine.

He was a brother of Ernest J. Drakeford (deceased), Frederick J. Drakeford (deceased). Maude Drakeford, who married F. S. Brown; Olive Drakeford, who married C. Hand; Emma Drakeford, who married R. Liddell; Ettie Drakeford, who married C. Ryan), Rose Drakeford of Sydney; Peter A. Drakeford of San Francisco, US; and Arthur S. Drakeford. M.P. (of 63 Park st., Moonee Ponds).
