= A. E. Y. Benham =

Australian bass singer

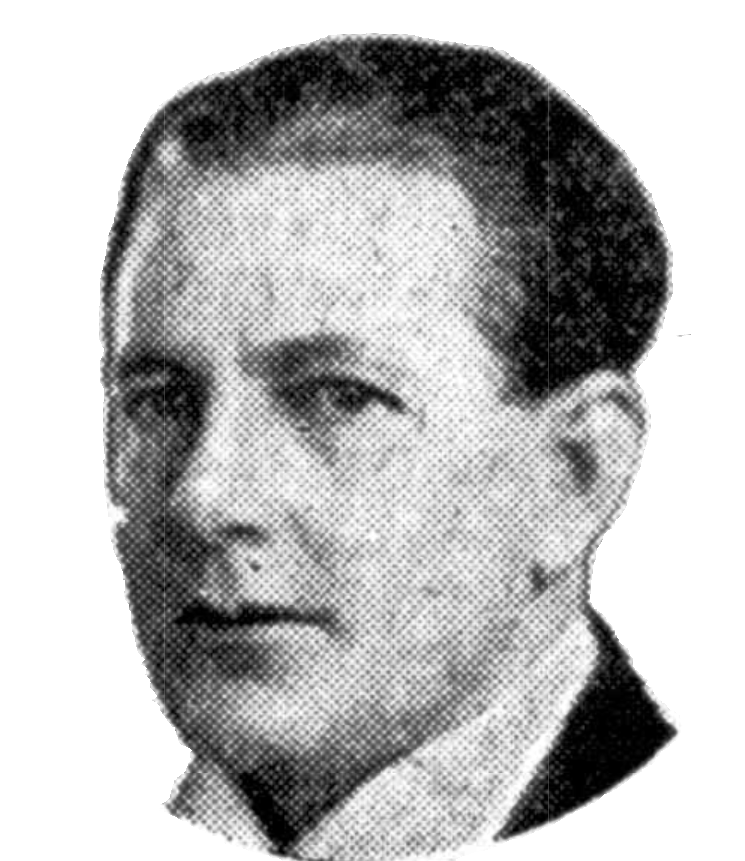
A. E. Y. Benham

Alfred Ernest Yonge Benham (c. May 1888 (Note: from Army attestation form NAA: MT1486/1, BENHAM/ALFRED ERNEST GEORGE (note typo) giving age as 28y3m; dated 28 August 1916. He was 73 inches (1.9 m) tall and weighed 198 pounds (90 kg) but rejected for service due to varicose veins.) – 27 December 1962), generally referred to as A. E. Y. Benham, but "Ernest" to his family, was an Australian bass singer, praised by Nellie Melba, but never achieved the overseas success she envisaged.

== Early life ==
Benham was born in Melbourne, 10 May 1888, the youngest of six children of Frederick Yonge Benham (12 July 1854 – 11 October 1929) and Helen Rachel Benham nee Hare (5 December 1855 – 9 August 1931) His father was an excellent organist and a piano tuner by avocation, but was in business as a dealer in printing machinery. They divorced in 1895.

Benham was a grandson of Rev. Spencer Yonge Benham (c. 1800 – 6 June 1866), of Castlemaine, and a great-nephew of the author Charlotte Mary Yonge.

Three years after Benham was born, the family moved to Sydney. Nothing has been found about his childhood and schooling. From around 1910 he was employed with Sydney Council's electric light department, rising to the rank of leading hand meter reader at £8 per week.

=== Career ===
Benham's parents were adherents of the Anglican Church, and around age seven he began singing in the choir of St Clement's Church, Mosman. Around 1911 he started taking singing lessons from Percy Herford, and subsequently won the first and only New South Wales championship for a bass solo; later teachers were Andrew Black and William B. Beattie.

In 1914 he sang the bass parts in Elgar's King Olaf, produced by the Royal Philharmonic Society at the Sydney Town Hall. Later in the same year he gave his first recital in St James' Hall, and still later sang in Handel's Messiah, a part he would fill many times over the years.

He volunteered for service with the First AIF but was rejected on medical grounds, so performed at patriotic concerts free of charge: some 257 appearances in the years 1916–1917.

Benham was a big man with a big voice that spanned over two octaves, from lower C to top F (C_{2}–F_{4}). He became a protégé of Dame Nellie Melba, who was confident his admitted faults could be rectified with expert tuition, and offered to pay his passage to Europe, and to introduce him to some of the great singing teachers of London. She saw him as the successor to Pol Plançon, the great French basse chantante.

Following a series of fundraising concerts, Benham embarked for London on the steamer Hobson's Bay on 2 September 1922, with £1,000 from benefits and personal savings on which to survive in London. He found a teacher in Dinh Gilly and received a few favorable reviews but returned after three years, penniless to the point of having to borrow money for the return fare.

It was an old story. As an aspiring performer he needed accommodation at a decent address, and formal wear for stage appearances; travel for tuition, interviews and auditions, money for concert tickets and social functions. Like hundreds of other Australian hopefuls, the money leaked away before he got the "break" that led to paid employment, and had to rely on friends for the return passage. Some felt that Melba should have been more helpful; she had led him on with false expectations. Her pianist, Lindley Evans was unsympathetic.

He tried to get his old job back, but a replacement had been appointed. He found employment promoting the Gulbransen registering piano, and the Tonalic Sonora, a gramophone.

He remained a popular basso or bass-baritone, appearing on radio and on stage throughout New South Wales and Queensland, and in 1936 became a radio announcer for 4MB, Maryborough, but was never again referred to as having been "discovered by Melba".

== Family ==
A. E. Y. Benham married Florence "Flora" Isabel Breillat (1894 – 20 April 1967). Their last residence was in Northbridge, New South Wales. No mention has been found of any offspring. Florence was a granddaughter of Thomas Chaplin Breillat.

His siblings include:

- Frederick Henry "Fred" Yonge Benham (c. 1871 – 27 December 1934) married Charlotte (Lottie) Gillham Montgomery. He was an actor and director with J. C. Williamson's.
- Helen Yonge Benham (22 July 1877 – 22 Jun 1963) married Albert David Sommer
- Hubert Spencer "Bert" Yonge Benham (6 April 1880 – 9 March 1922) married Amy Violet Kerr
- Lilian May "Lill" Yonge Benham (18 September 1882 – 11 May 1951) never married
- Harold Euston Yonge Benham (24 February 1885 -16 January 1944) married Margaret Hamilton Bell
