= Shirley poppy =

Cultivar group of European wild field poppy

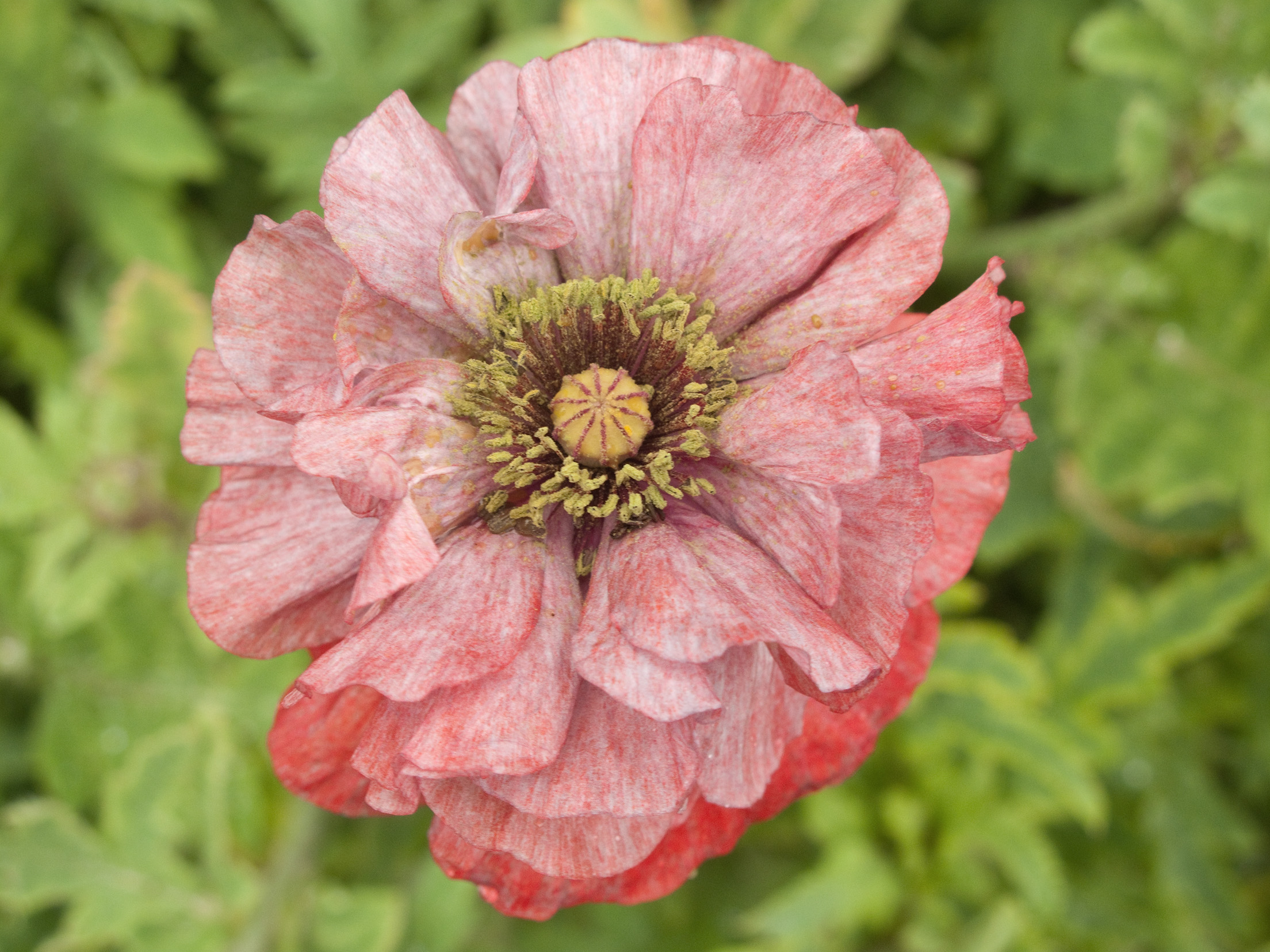
- Shirley poppy
- Species: Papaver rhoeas
- Origin: Shirley, London in England.
- Cultivar group members: single forms semi-double forms double forms picotee form

The Shirley poppy is an annual ornamental cultivar group derived from the European wild field poppy (Papaver rhoeas).

== History ==
The Shirley poppy was created from 1880 onwards by the Reverend William Wilks, vicar of the parish of Shirley in England. Wilks found in a corner of his garden where it adjoined arable fields, a variant of the field poppy that had a narrow white border around the petals. By careful selection and hybridization over many years he obtained a strain of poppies ranging in colour from white and pale lilac to pink and red, and unlike the wild poppies these had no dark blotches at the base of the petals. Further selection has given rise to semi-double and double forms, as well as flowers with a ring of contrasting colour around the edge: the picotee form.

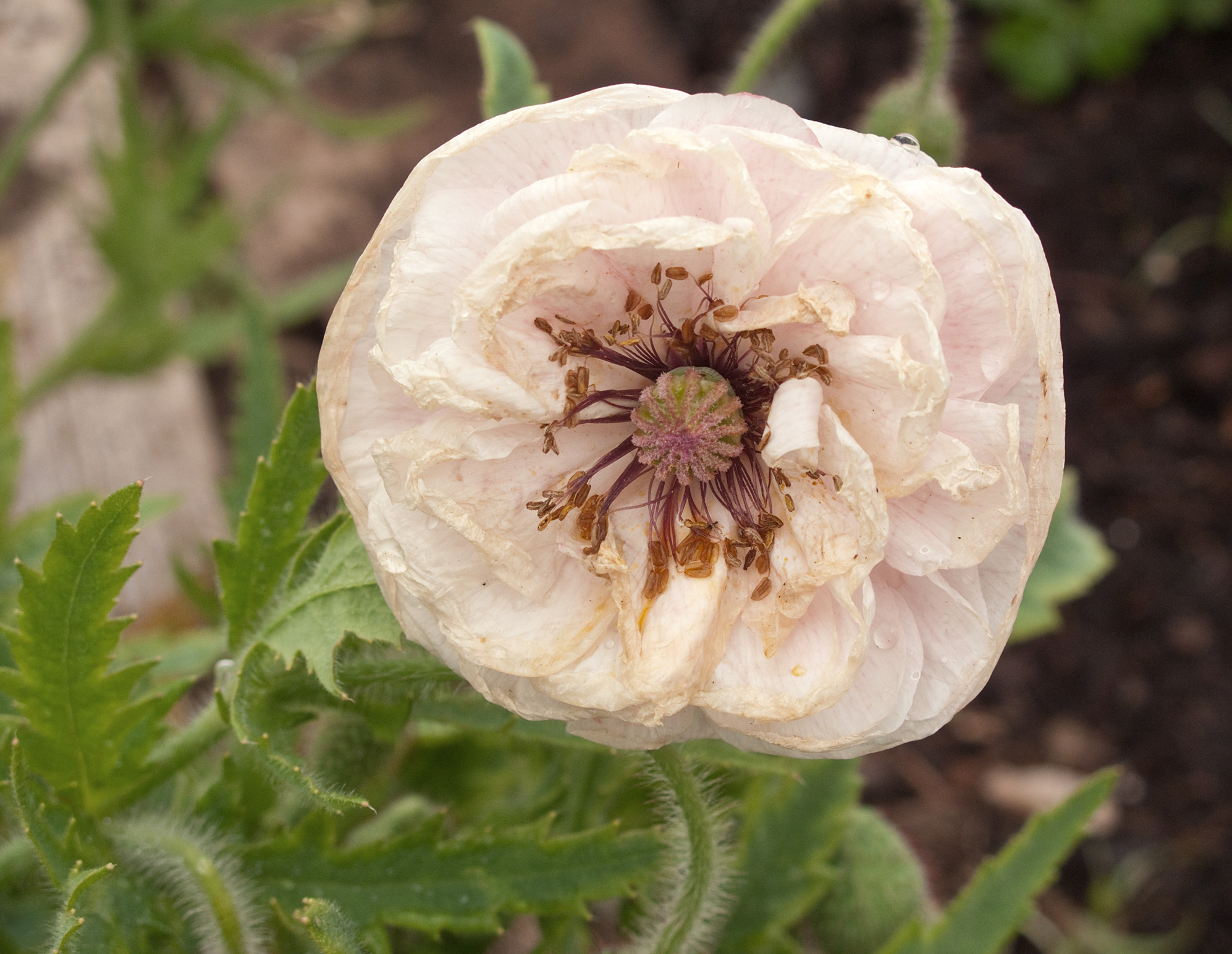
Shirley poppy

== Genetics of Shirley poppies ==
The striking example of deviation from a wild type under artificial selection provided by the Shirley poppy attracted the attention of pioneer geneticists and biometricians. The biometrician Karl Pearson used the Shirley poppy to study his ideas of homotyposis, which he defined as “the quantitative degree of resemblance to be found on the average between the like parts of organisms”. However Pearson's work on Shirley poppy was ridiculed by the pioneer geneticist William Bateson for ignoring the recently discovered analytical methods of Mendelian genetics. Bateson wrote: "Misconception of the nature and significance of intermediates has deprived the work of the biometrical school of scientific value as a contribution to the study of heredity. This is well seen in the case of the colours of the Shirley Poppies, one of the subjects with reference to which copious statistics have been amassed and published". The rancorous debate between genetics and biometrics, in which the Shirley poppy became embroiled, was only resolved through the work of Ronald Fisher who showed that the two schools of thought were actually compatible.

== Cultivation ==
Sir Cedric Morris created another form such as 'Mother of Pearl'. Later 'Cedric Morris', 'Fairy Wings' and 'Angels' Choir' were found These are taller-growing semi-doubles and doubles, as well as 'Shirley Double Mixed'. They can grow to between 18in and 2 ft tall, on lightish soil in sun or light shade. They grow quickly from seeds scattered in April.

== Culture ==
The Mayor of Croydon’s has as his staff of office a silver mace, on which the head is decorated with the 'Shirley poppy'. In 1935 there was a public house called ‘The Shirley Poppy’ pub, although it has been converted into a burger outlet.
