= Picotee =

Type of flowers of two different colors

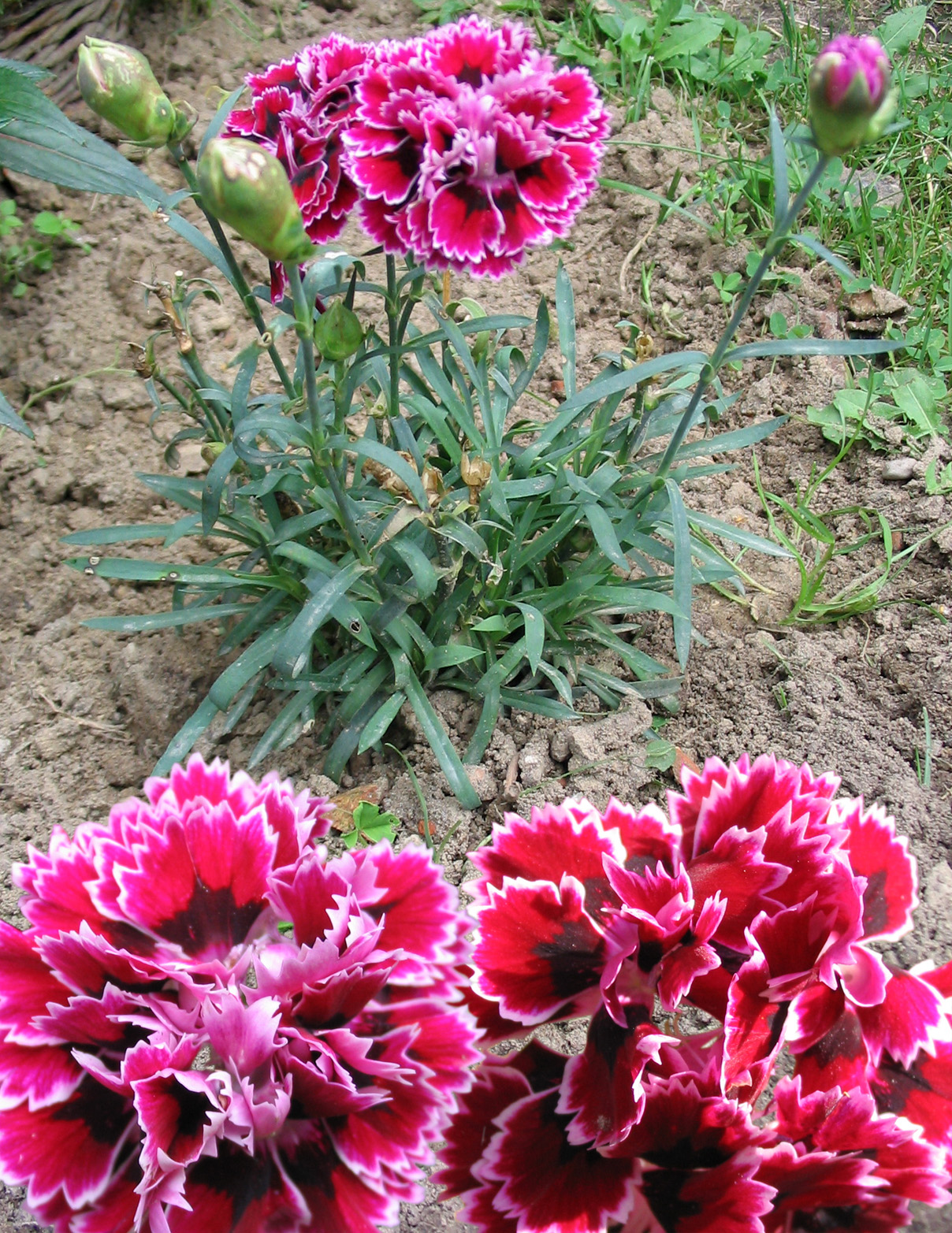
Picotee edges on flowers

Picotee describes flowers whose edges are of a different color than the flowers' base color. The word originates from the French picoté, meaning 'marked with points'. Picotee flowers can have a variety of patterning styles, such as darker petal margins than interior regions, or petal margins which are lighter. Similarly, the size of the margin coloring can vary from large regions to thin "lace" stripes along the edge of the petal. The transition between colors can be stark or blended.

Picotee flowers are coveted in ornamental varieties. These varieties have been documented since the early 18th century, with the word first being defined in the English language in 1727. Common ornamental flowers with picotee include tulips, daylilies, carnations, amaryllis, peonies, and begonias. Picotee patterns are also observed in wild plant species.

The mechanism underlying picotee pattern formation often involves different gene expression patterns of pigment biosynthesis or degrading enzymes. This results in either higher accumulation of pigment molecules in certain parts of the flower, creating a dark pigmented area, or conversely increased breakdown of these pigments will result in a lighter color. The differential expression of these enzymes can be due to regulation by transcription factors or small RNAs. In some cases, transposable element activity results in colored sectors or patches in flowers described as sectorial picotee.

== Examples ==
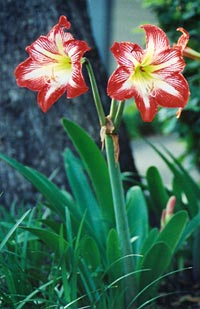
Hippeastrum

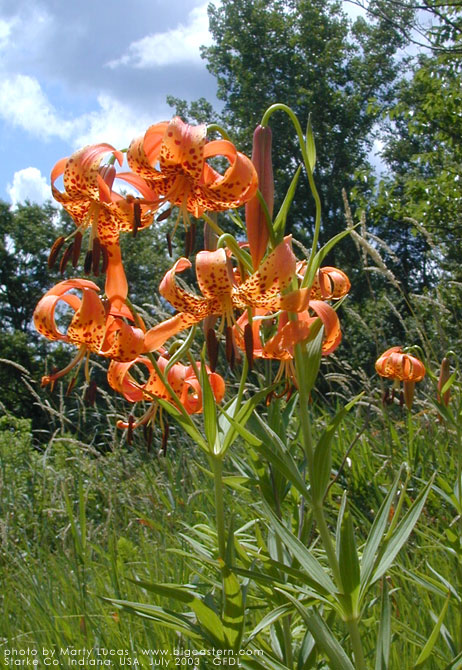
Lilium

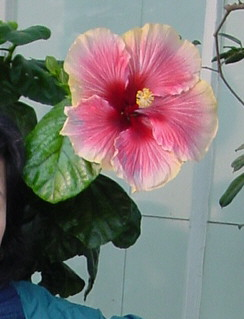
Chinese hibiscus

Castilleja

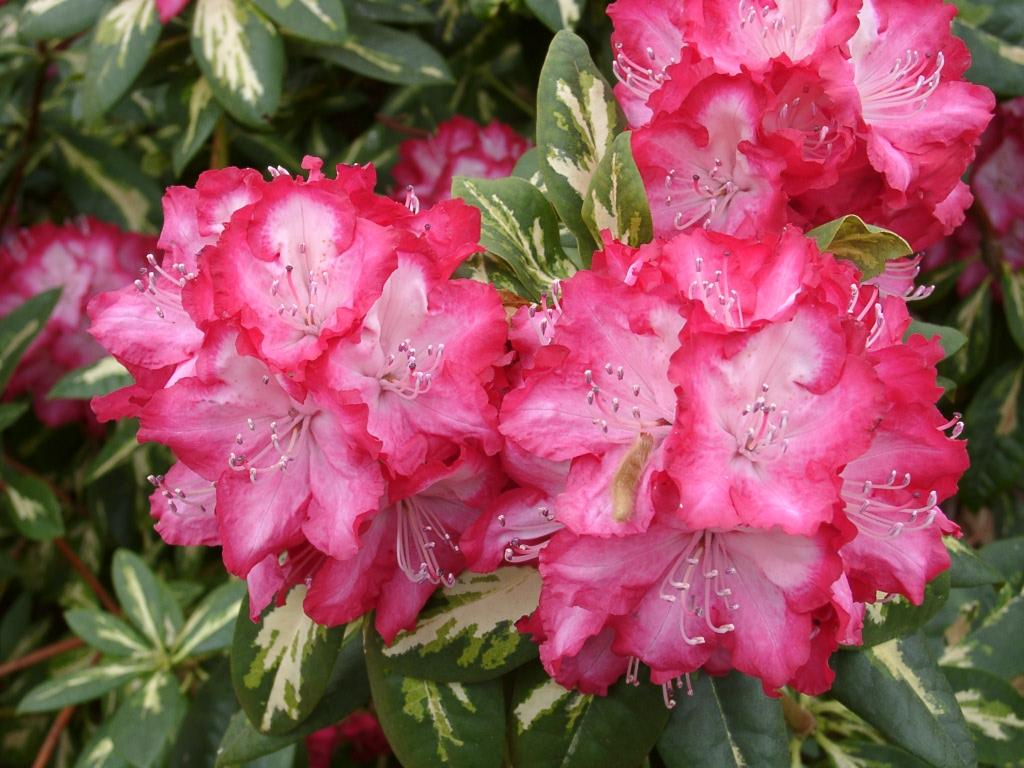
Rhododendron 'President Roosevelt'

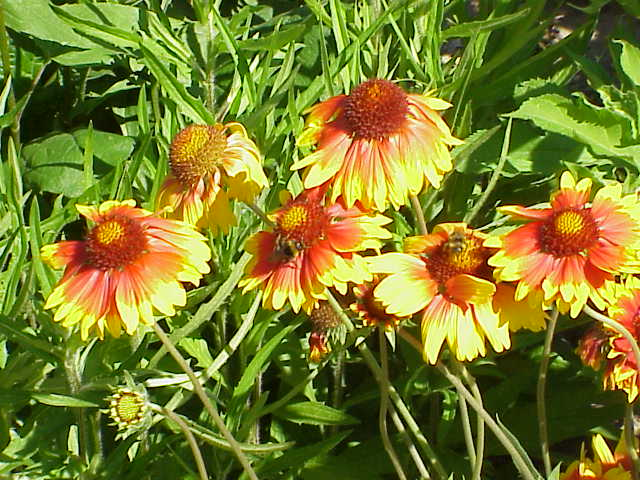
Gaillardia
