= Spring Park, Croydon =

Coordinates: 51.375745°N 0.031049°W

Spring Park
- Location within Greater London
- London borough: Bromley; Croydon
- Ceremonial county: Greater London
- Region: London
- Country: England
- Sovereign state: United Kingdom
- Post town: CROYDON
- Postcode district: CR0
- Dialling code: 020
- Police: Metropolitan
- Fire: London
- Ambulance: London
- UK Parliament: Croydon East; Beckenham and Penge
- London Assembly: Bexley and Bromley; Croydon and Sutton

Spring Park is a small area in London, England. It is within the London Borough of Bromley and the London Borough of Croydon, straddling the traditional Kent-Surrey border along The Beck. Spring Park is located north of Addington, west of West Wickham and south of Monks Orchard and Shirley.

== History ==
The area was historically known as Cold Harbour. Settlement began in the area in the 1830s at the instigation of the MP John Temple Leader, who employed the agricultural innovator Hewitt Davis to turn what was barren heathland into productive farmland. Large scale residential building began in the 1920s–1930s. The Shrublands council estate was constructed after the Second World War on compulsorily purchased land from the golf course.

The area contains a small row of shops at the junction of Bridle Road and Broom Road. The Goat pub, which closed in 2017 following an attack on a local asylum seeker, re-opened in 2019 as The Apple Tree.

== Notable residents ==
- Joshua Buatsi – boxer, grew up on the Shrublands estate.

== Gallery ==
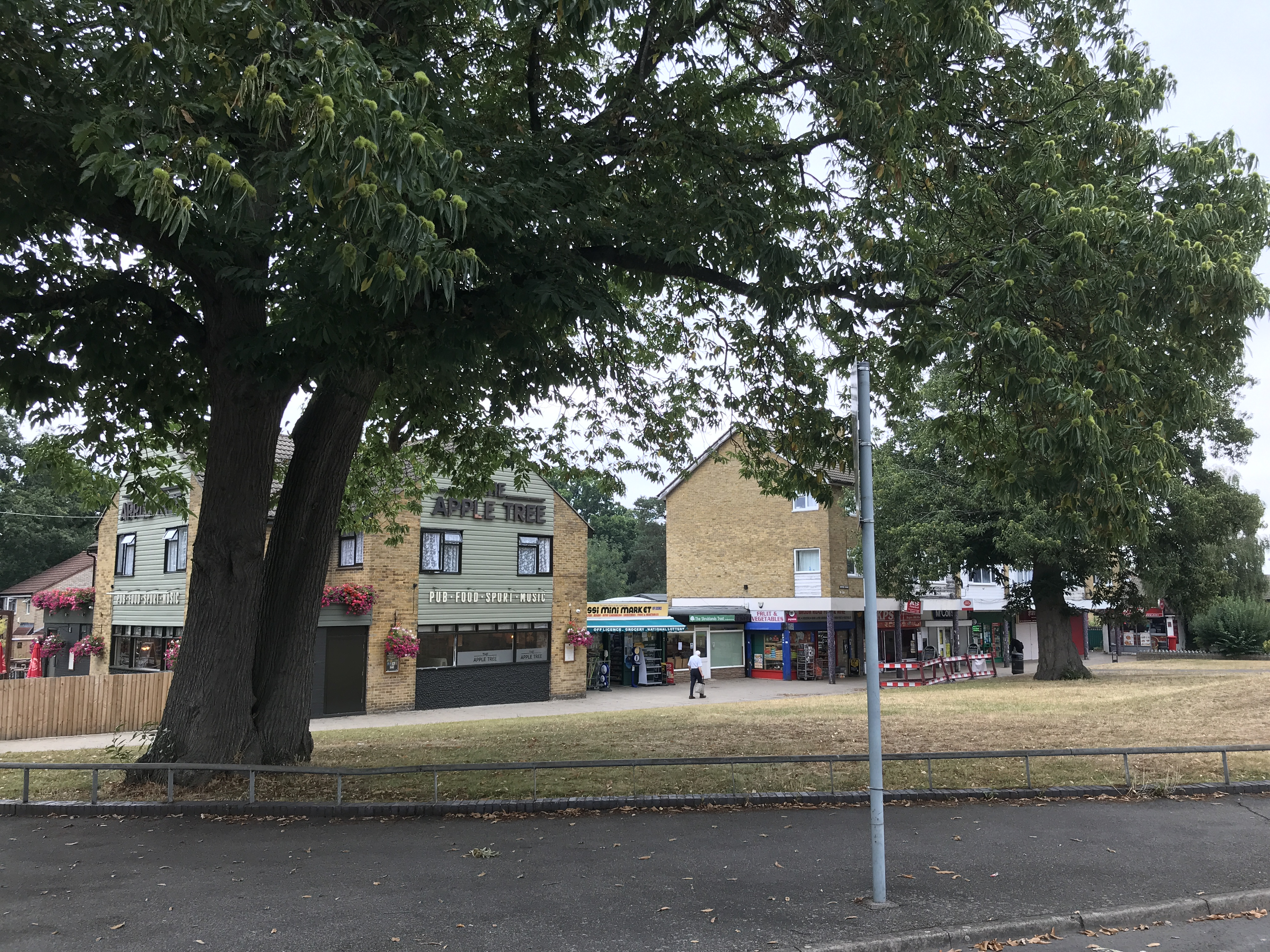
The Apple Tree pub, with Broom Road shops

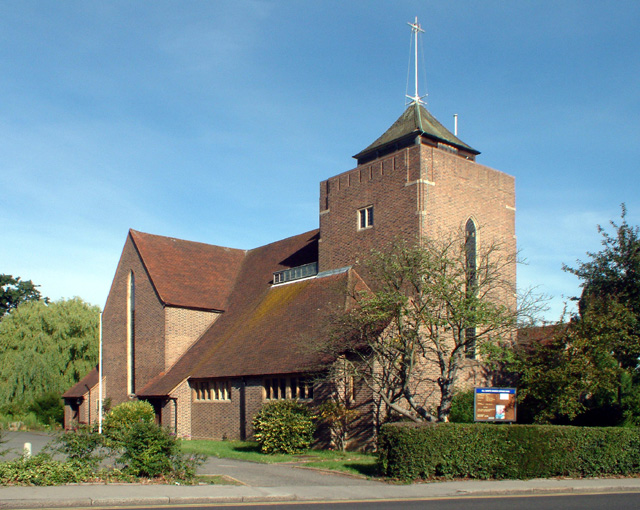
All Saints Church on Bridle Road was built in 1955–6 by William Curtis Green and is a Grade II listed building.

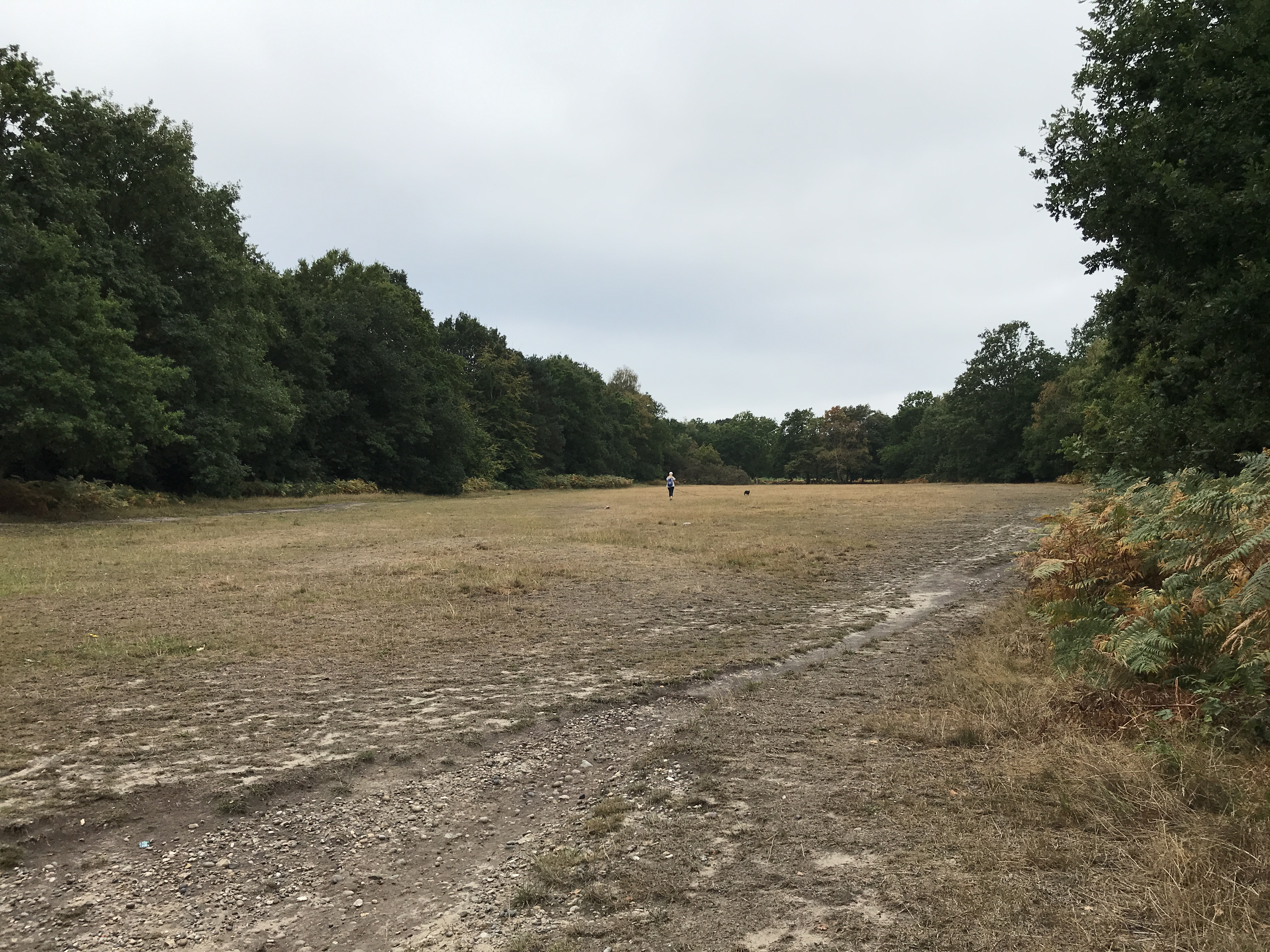
Clearing in the woods that border the Shrublands estate

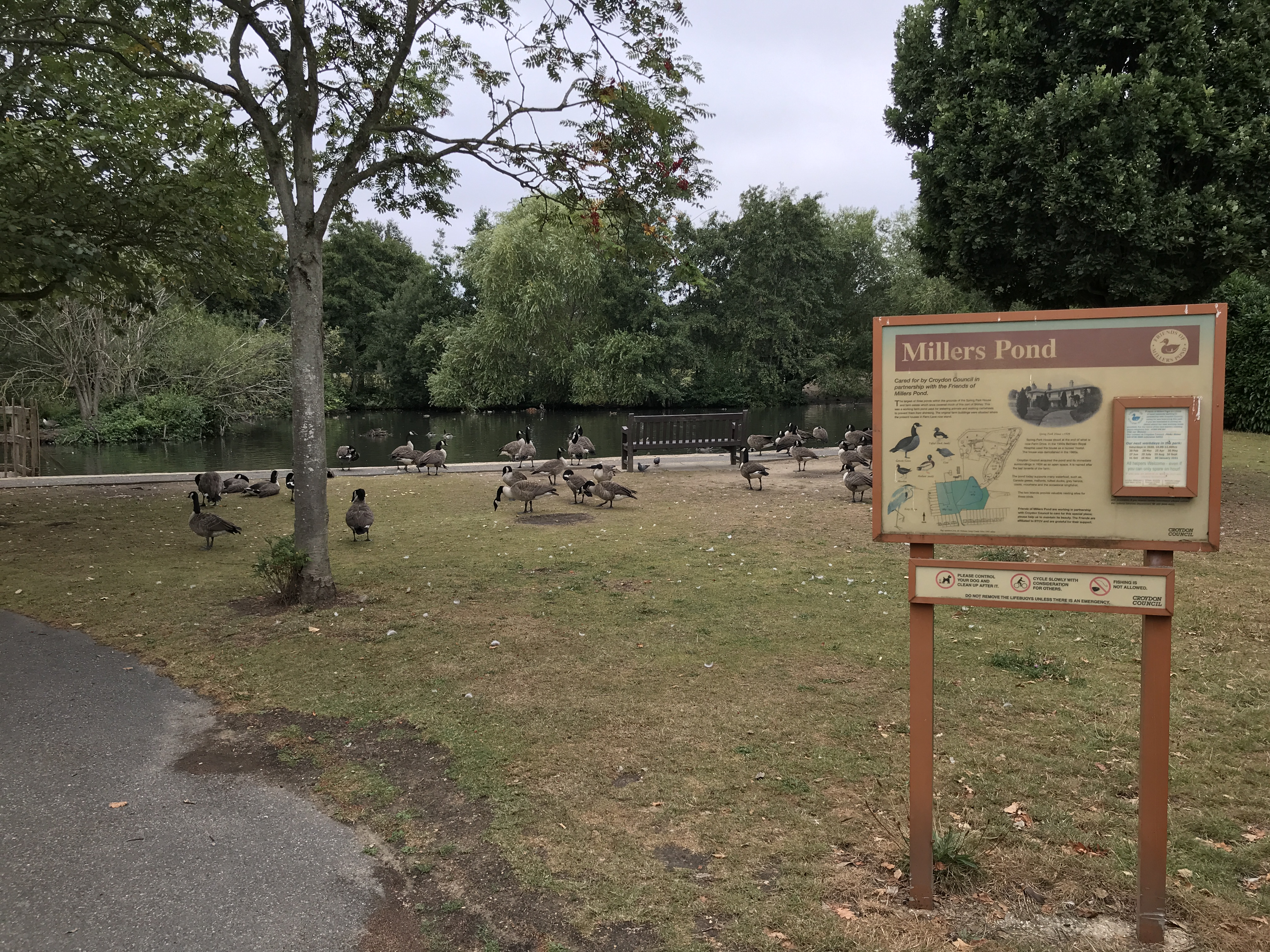
Millers Pond, originally part of Spring Park Farm
