= Millers Pond =

Public park in Croydon, UK

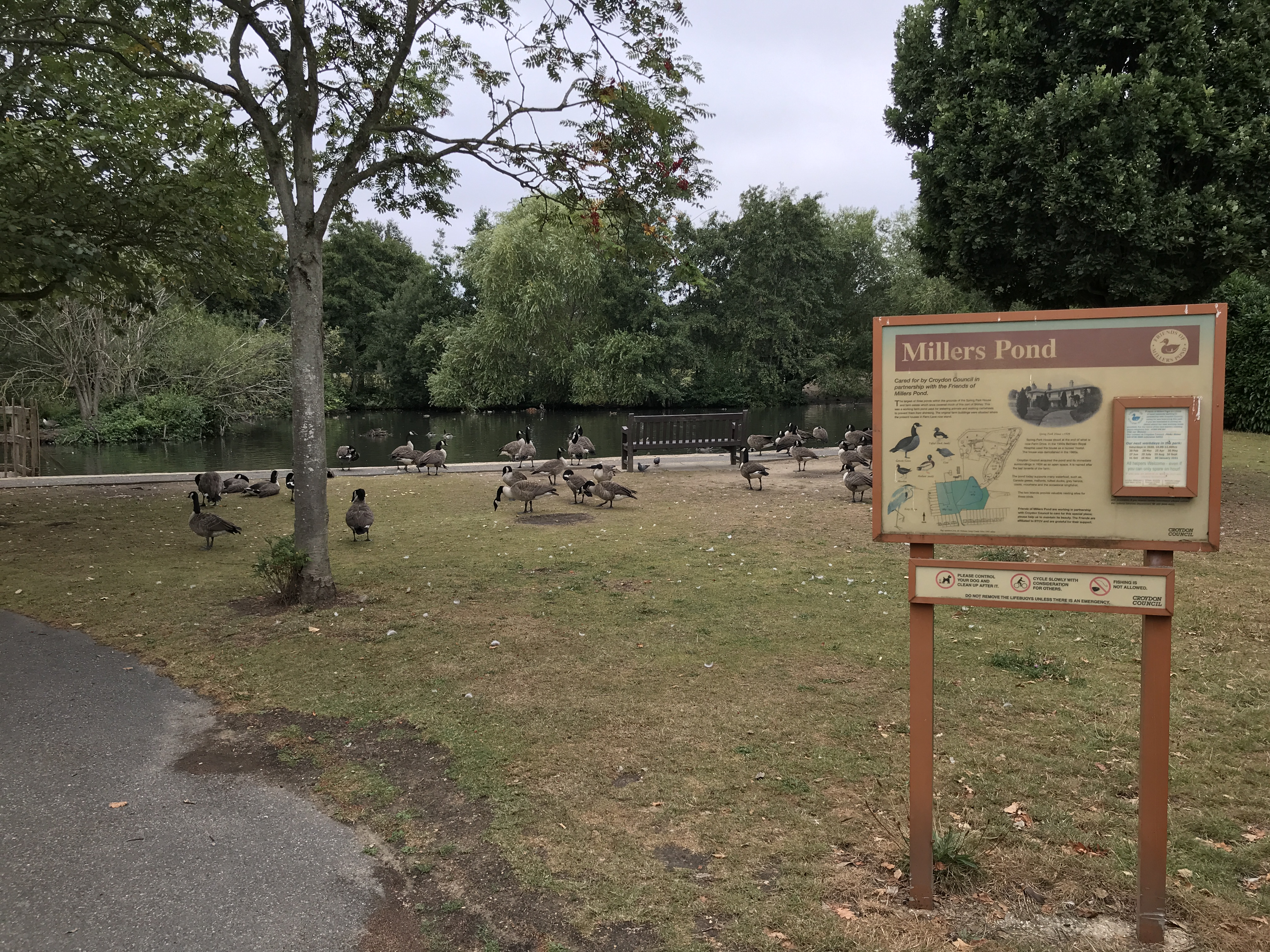
- Millers Pond as viewed from the eastern entrance off Worcester Close, August 2020

- Location within Greater London Location within England
- Interactive map of Millers Pond
- Type: Urban park
- Location: London, England
- OS grid: TQ 369 656
- Coordinates: 51°22′23″N 0°02′04″W
- Area: 4 acres (1.62 ha)
- Elevation: 75 metres (246 ft)
- Established: 1934
- Etymology: Miller family of Spring Park
- Manager: Croydon Council (in partnership with Friends of Millers Pond)
- Status: Open year-round
- Awards: Green Flag Award
- Public transit: Bus: 194, 198 (also 119, 356); Rail: West Wickham
- Facilities: Ornamental pond, toilets
- Website: Friends of Millers Pond

Millers Pond is a small park in the Spring Park area of the London Borough of Croydon, England.

== Description ==
Covering an area of some 4 acres (1.62 ha), Millers Pond includes a duck pond and a green area with trees and flower beds that includes tables and benches. It is surrounded by residential housing and is bounded to the south by Shirley Way (where the main entrance is located) and to the west by The Lees, with additional access onto Worcester Close to the east and Farm Lane (off Bennetts Way) to the north.

The pond features a number of timber structures around its perimeter, including a viewing platform, a dipping platform, and a boardwalk. The larger of the pond's two islands has a duck platform. The park includes toilet facilities.

Millers Pond is a Green Flag Award winner.

== History ==
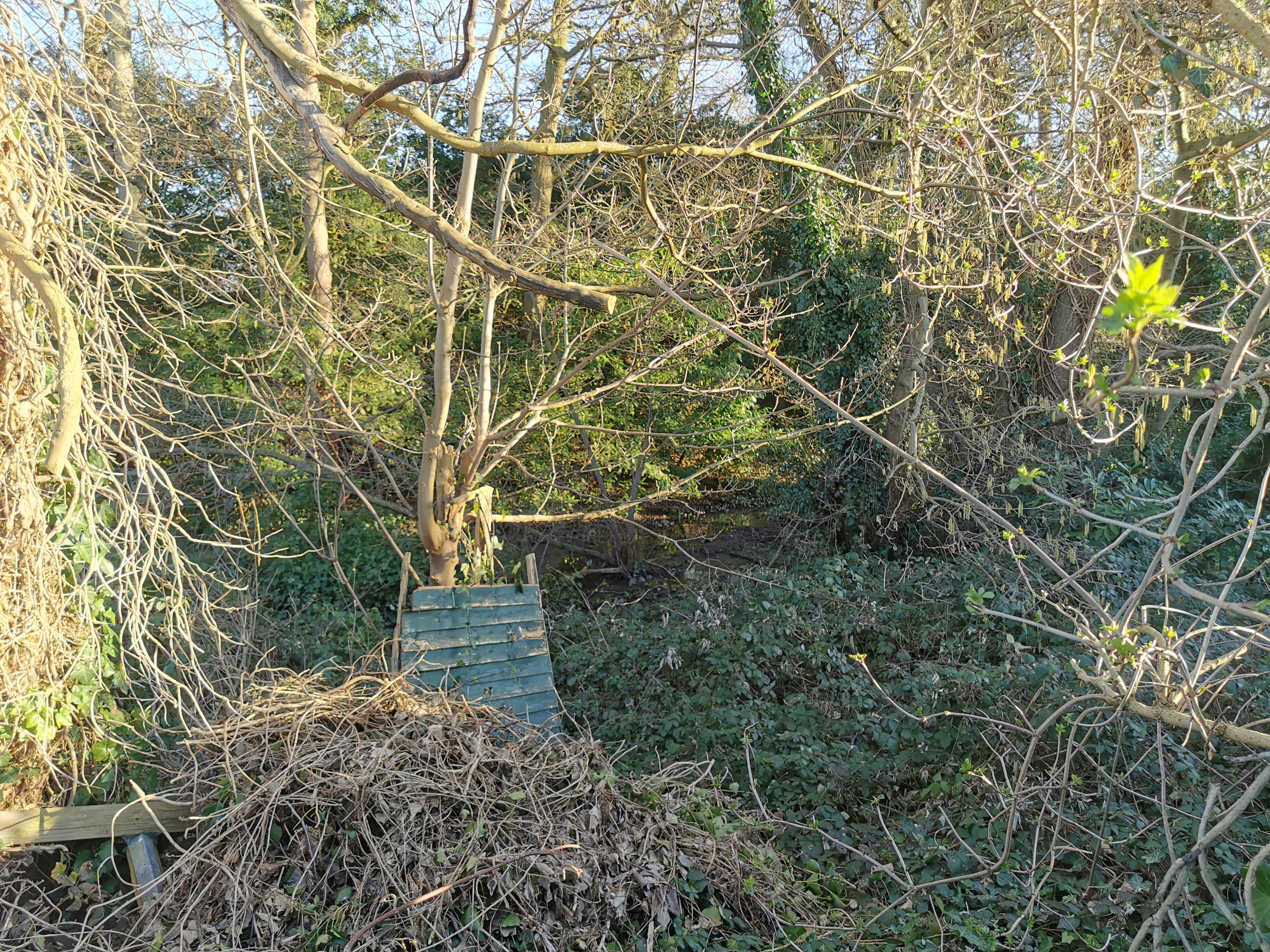
Site of the smallest of the three original ponds of Spring Park Farm, February 2021

Millers Pond was originally part of Spring Park Farm until its acquisition by Croydon Council in 1934. The pond itself is the largest of three that originally existed on the site. Farm Lane now runs where the farm buildings stood; the two smaller ponds were subsequently developed. Millers Pond derives its name from the last family to work on Spring Park Farm. The ponds of Spring Park Farm were once fed by a stream that ran around three sides of Temple Avenue Copse (51°22′14″N 00°02′15″W), a 4-acre (1.62 ha) area of mixed woodland to the southwest.

The rapid development of the area surrounding Spring Park in the first half of the 20th century can be seen in successive Ordnance Survey maps:

- Six inches to the mile, England and Wales: Kent XV (includes: Croydon St John the Baptist) – surveyed 1868; published 1871
- Six inches to the mile, England and Wales: Surrey XIV.SE (includes: Beckenham; Croydon St John the Baptist) – revised 1894–1895; published 1898
- 25 inches to the mile, England and Wales: Surrey XIV.12 (Beckenham; Croydon St John the Baptist) – revised 1911; published 1912
- 25 inches to the mile, England and Wales: Surrey XIV.12 (Beckenham; Croydon St John the Baptist) – revised 1934; published 1935
- 25 inches to the mile, England and Wales: Surrey XIV.12 (Beckenham; Croydon St John the Baptist) – revised 1942; published 1947

When Spring Park House was put up for auction in July 1957, its 5 acres (2.0 ha) of grounds were described as follows:

The lawns slope gradually away from the House to the south, with rhododendron and azalea bushes, to the Ornamental Lakes, Tennis Lawn and small Meadow. The boundaries are all well screened by matured trees and amongst several fine specimens are various cypress, chestnut and elm, a mulberry, a quince and one of the largest girth oak trees in the country.

Millers Pond is managed by Croydon Council in partnership with Friends of Millers Pond, a volunteer group of local residents formed in 1998 to represent the users of the park and monitor proposed changes.

== Wildlife ==
Species of wildfowl commonly seen in the pond include mallards, Canada geese, coots, and moorhens. Occasional visitors include greylag geese, Egyptian geese, bean geese, Muscovy ducks, tufted ducks, mute swans, herons, cormorants, and even mandarin ducks. Feral parakeets and various gulls also commonly visit the park. The pond hosts terrapins and carp up to 2 feet (61 cm) long. No fishing is allowed in the park and dogs must be kept on leads.

Millers Pond and its two adjacent ponds to the north (which are not publicly accessible) are notably home to a diverse range of amphibians, including frogs, toads, and both smooth and palmate newts (the latter a rare species in London).

Millers Pond and the two adjacent ponds are collectively designated as a nature conservation area of 1.38 hectares (3.4 acres); they are listed under the name Spring Park Ponds as a Borough Grade II site by Greenspace Information for Greater London (GiGL), the environmental record centre for Greater London. According to GiGL, the ponds "are of value simply due to the shortage of wetland habitats on the dry foothills of the North Downs".

== Gallery ==
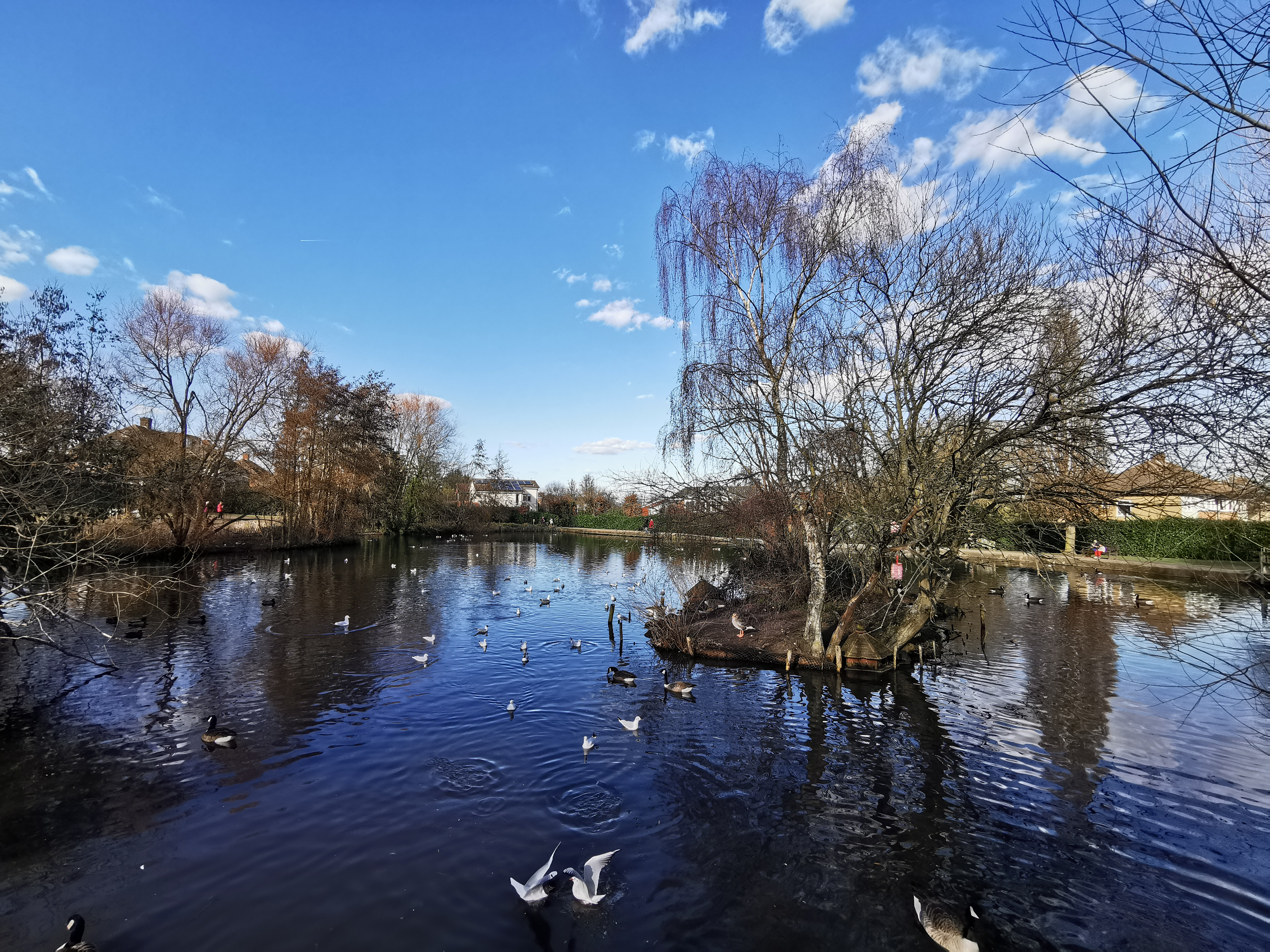
View towards the northern end with the smaller of the pond's two islands on the right

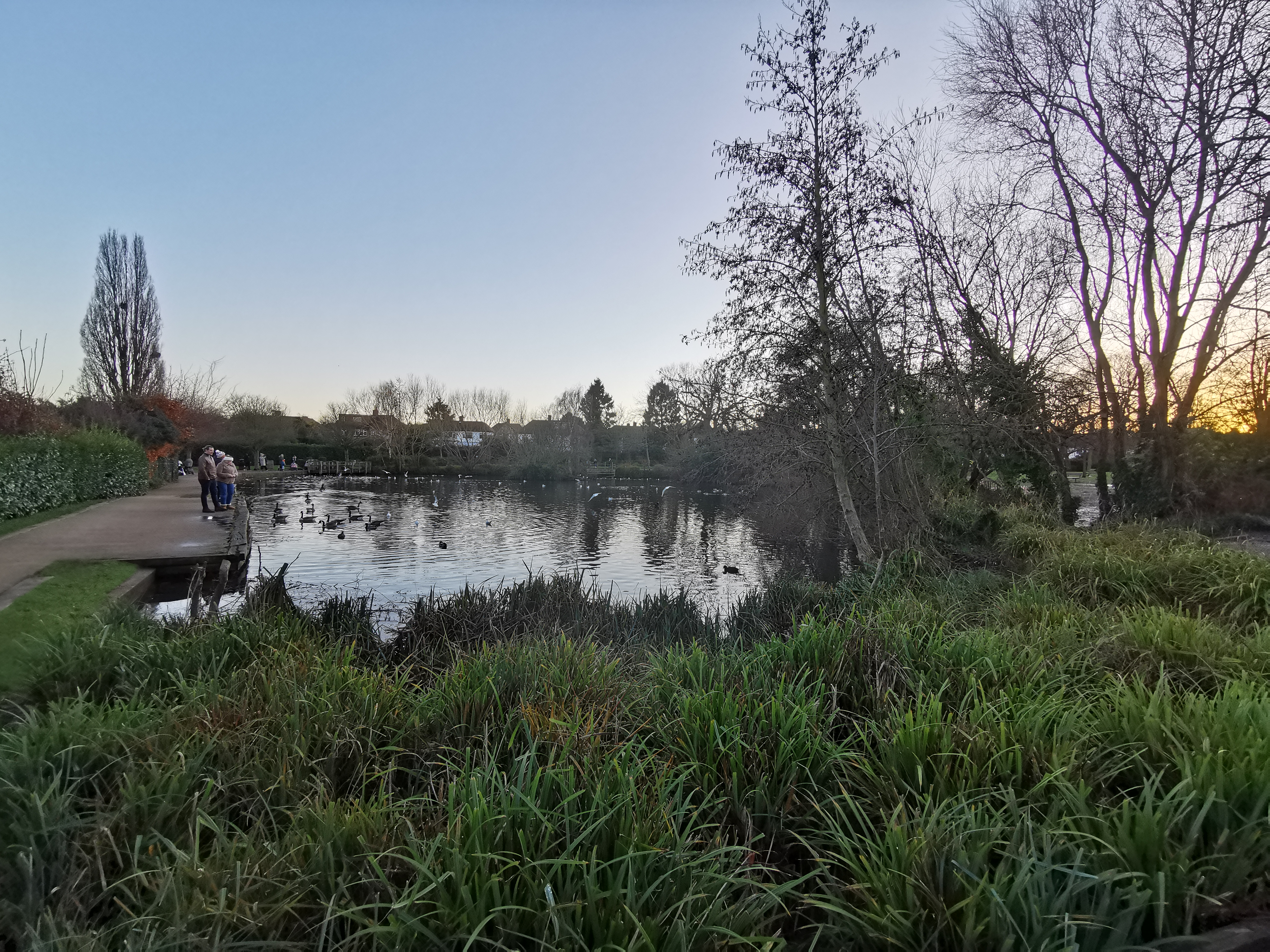
View from the boardwalk in the northeastern corner with reeds in the foreground

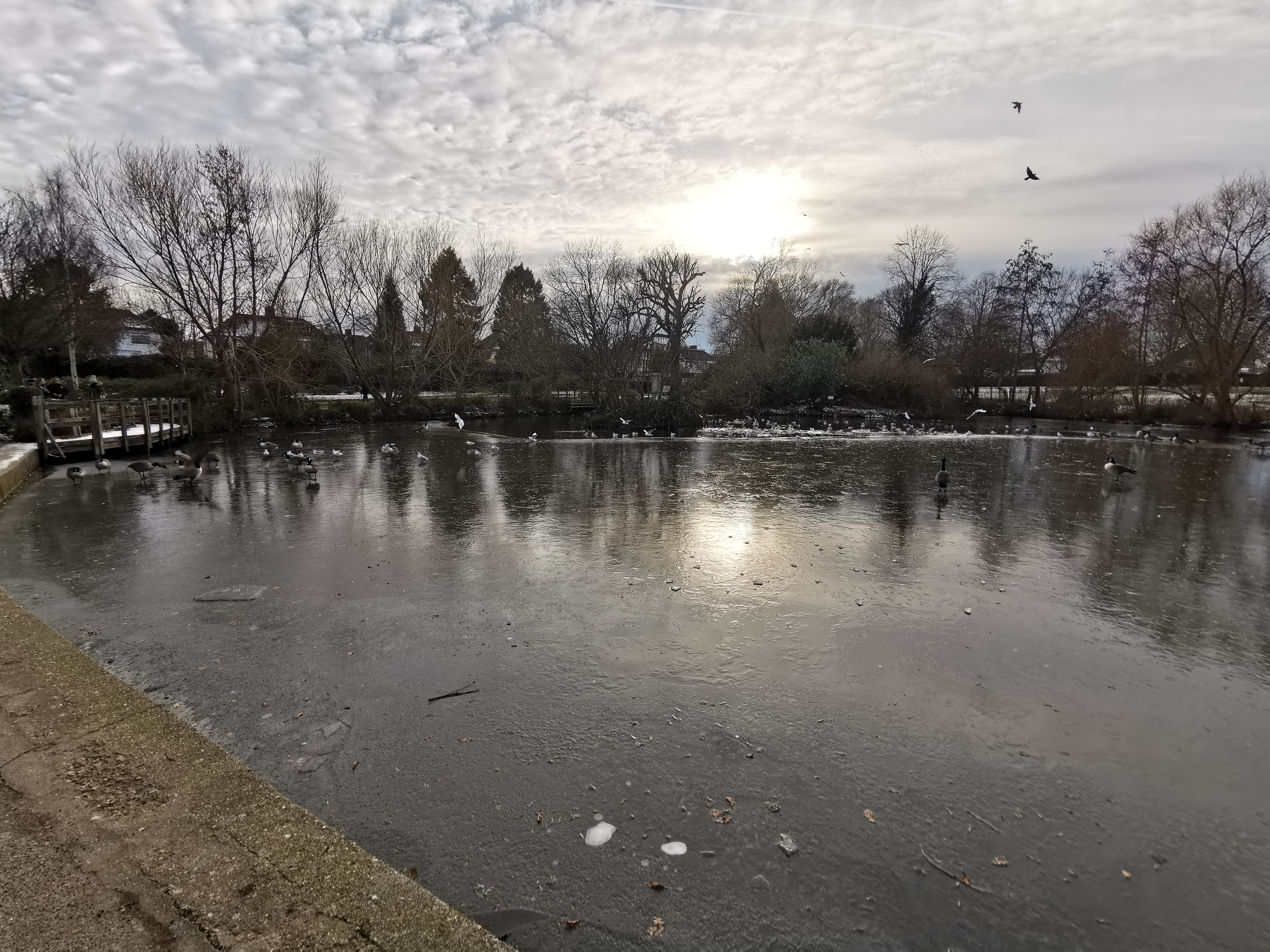
Pond partially frozen over following the "Beast from the East II" of February 2021

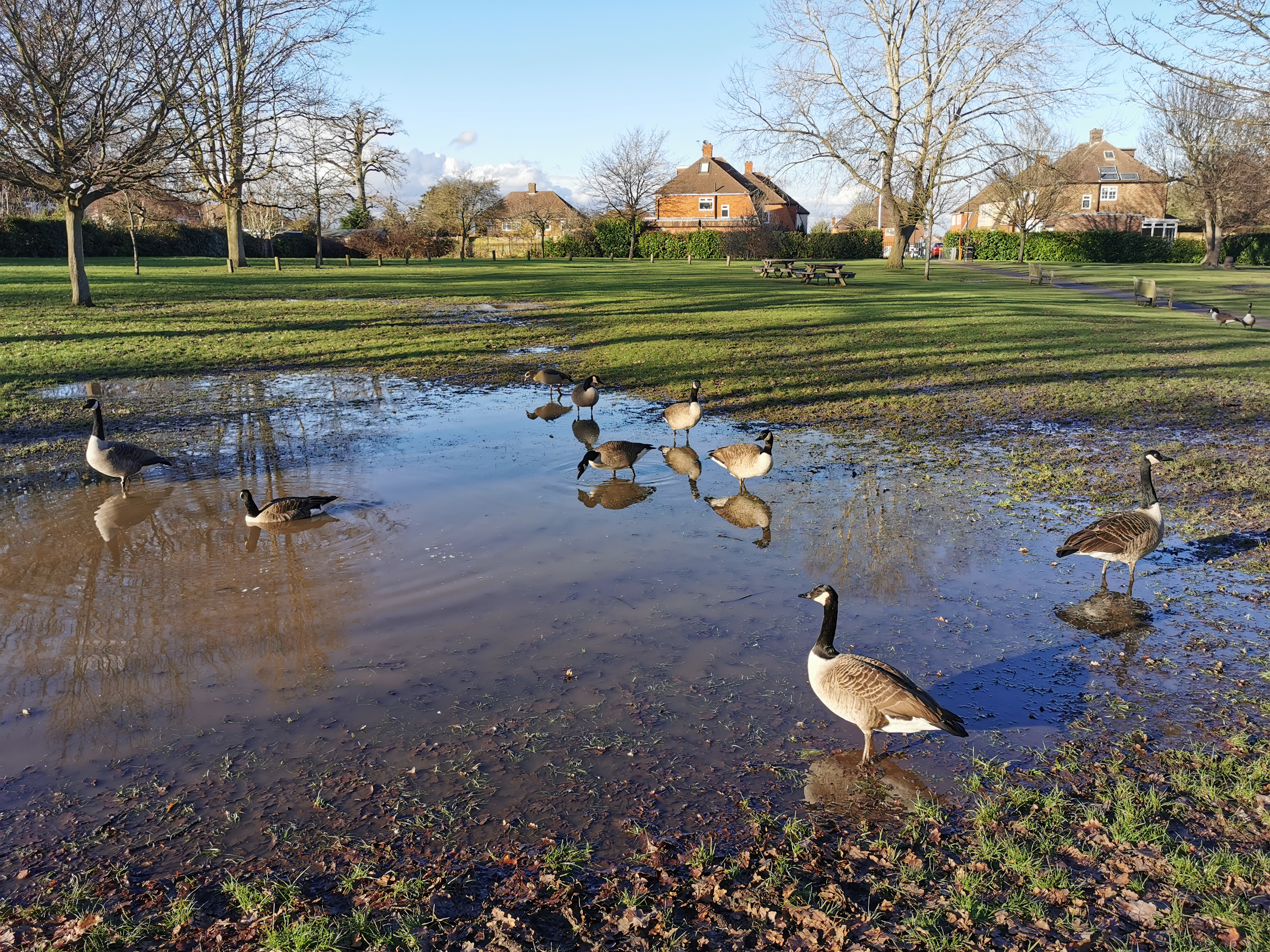
Main grassy area west of the pond looking towards the northern exit onto Farm Lane

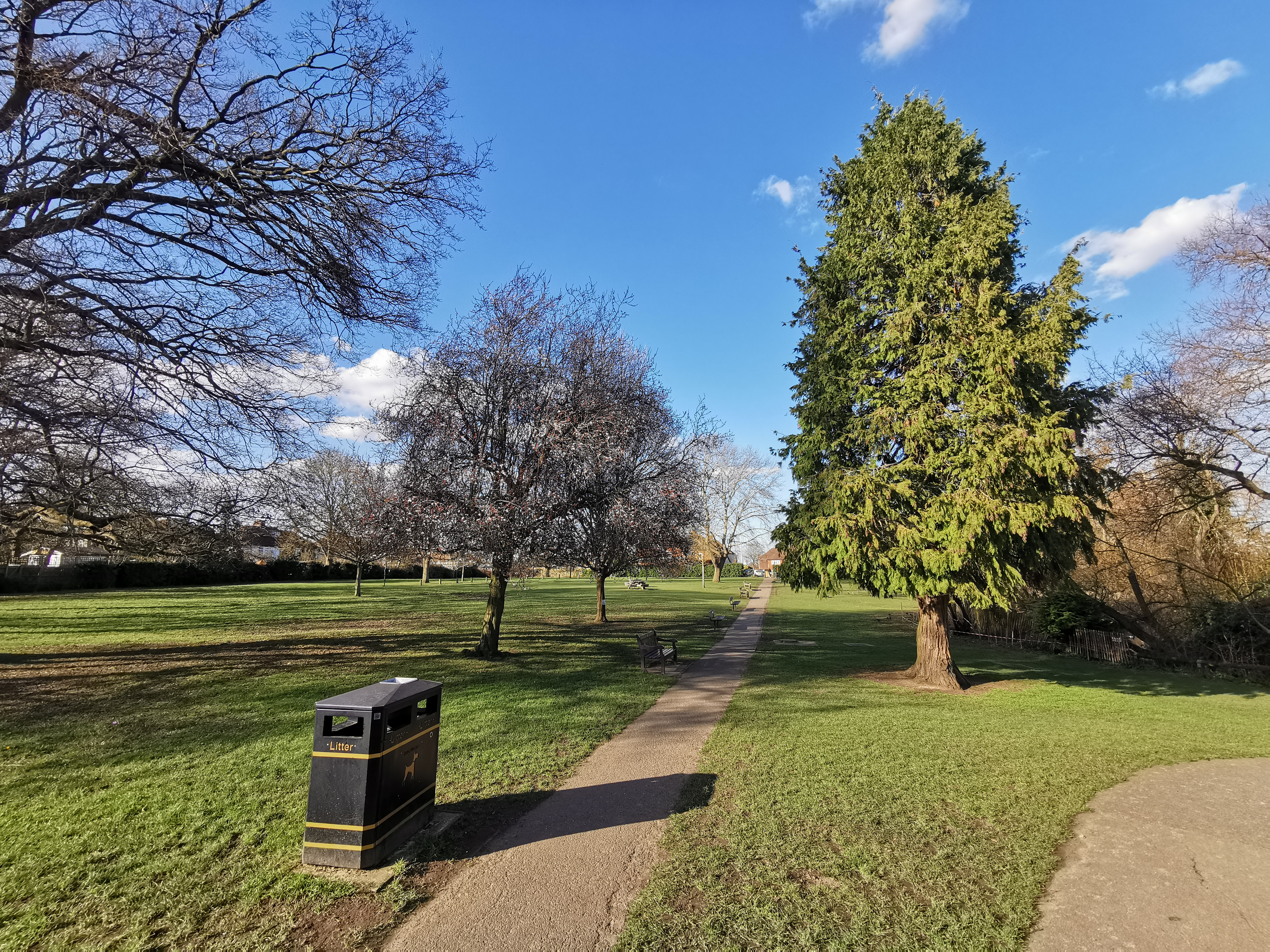
Green area west of the pond, as viewed from the main entrance off Shirley Way

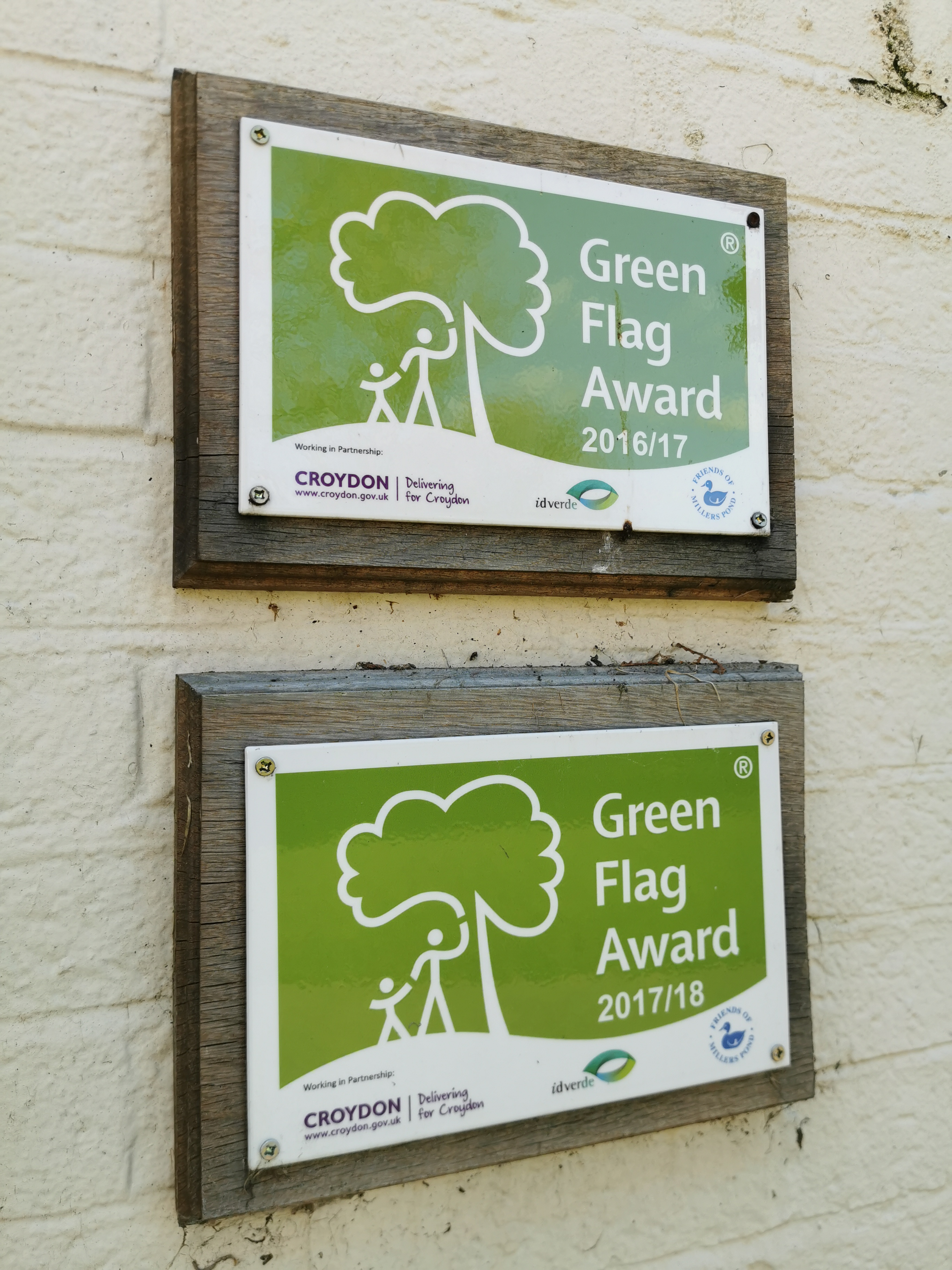
Green Flag Awards for 2016/17 and 2017/18

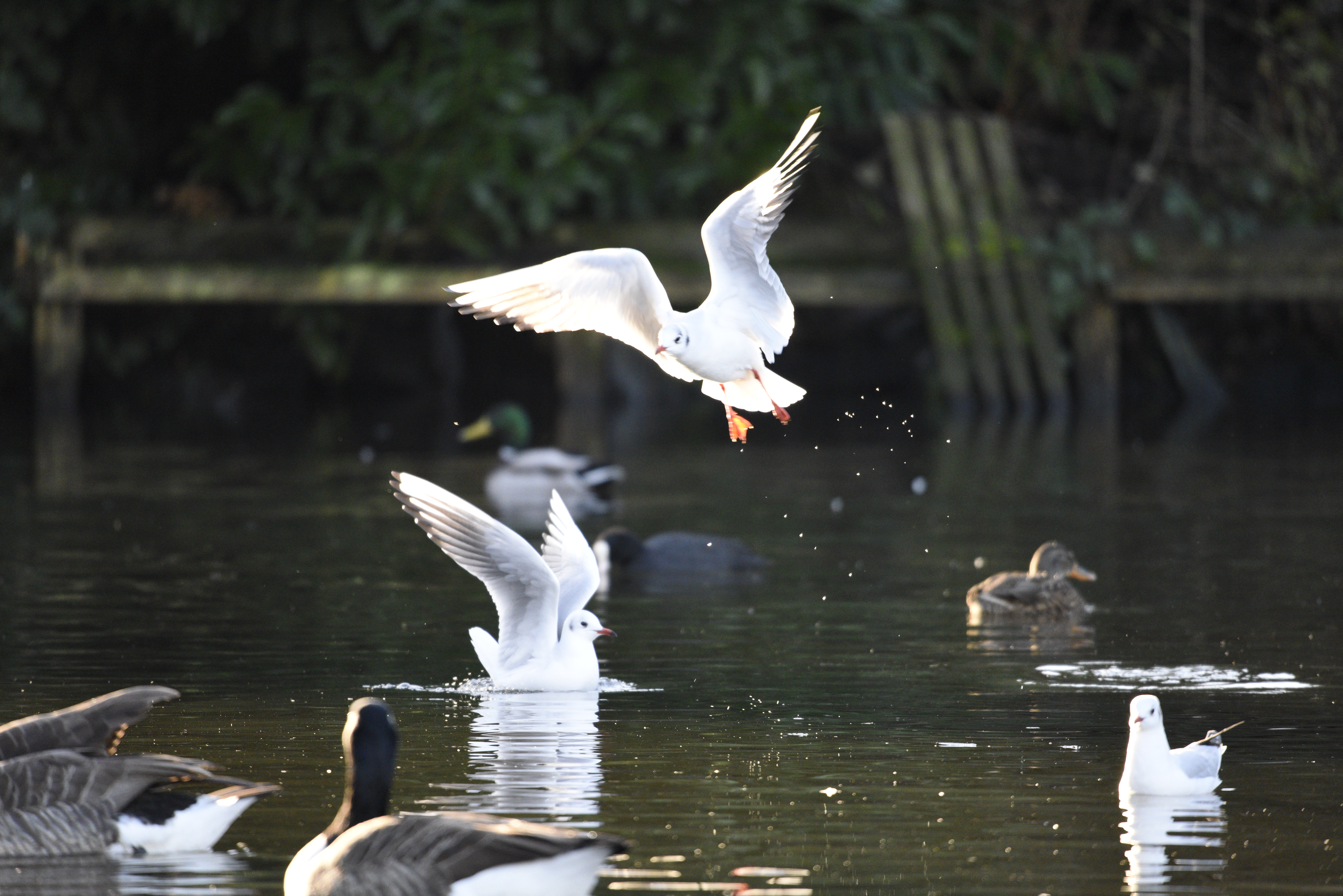
Gulls, mallards, Canada geese, and a coot
