= William Wilks =

British horticulturalist and clergyman

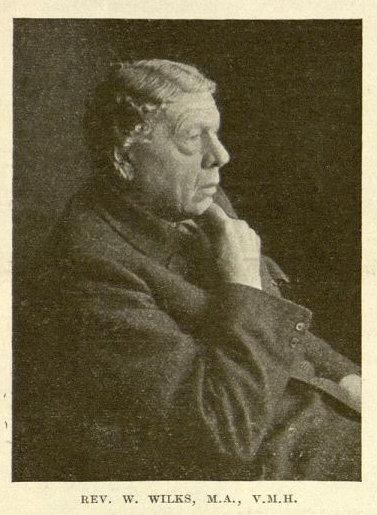

Reverend William Wilks (1843–1923) was a notable British horticulturalist and clergyman. He served as secretary of the Royal Horticultural Society from 1888 to 1919 and as editor of its journal, he was instrumental in getting the work of Gregor Mendel translated and published in English for the first time in 1901. This translation of Mendel's 1865 paper was made by Charles Thomas Druery with the involvement of William Bateson.

== Details ==
Following education at Oxford University, William Wilks served as Curate in the parish of Croydon. In 1879 he became the incumbent of the parish of Shirley.

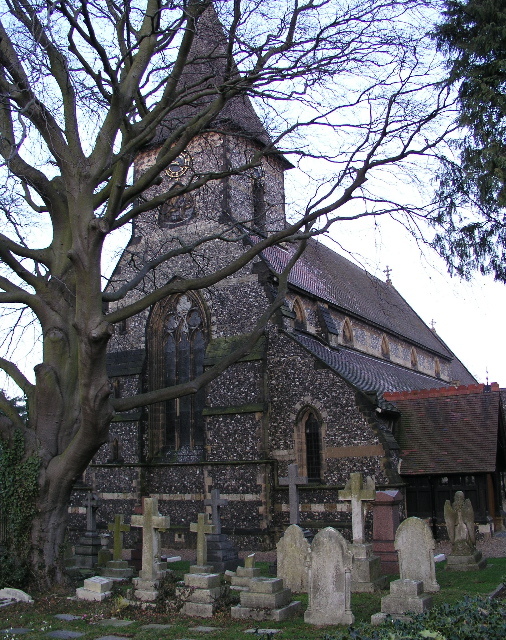
St John’s Church in Shirley, Croydon, where William Wilks was the incumbent from 1879

Wilks attained some fame as a horticulturalist and was awarded the Victoria Medal of Honour by the Royal Horticultural Society for his work. He also served as one of the most distinguished Secretaries of the Royal Horticultural Society, and the ornate wrought-iron gates at the Society's garden at Wisley commemorate him and his flower.

== The Shirley poppy ==
Wilks was extremely interested in the phenomenon of hybridization. As secretary of the RHS, he organized several conferences on hybridization. It was in the third conference that Wilks organized that Bateson coined the word "genetics". Wilks' most famous horticultural work concerned the breeding of the Shirley poppy. Wilks noticed an unusual poppy in a corner of his garden ("abutting on the fields"). This was a minor variant of the wild poppy, Papaver rhoeas, in which the petals were bordered by a strip of white. From this slight variation, by patient crossing and selection, he bred the varied and ornamental "Shirley poppies".
