= Shirley, London =

Area of south London, England

Coordinates: 51.3813°N 0.0543°W

Shirley
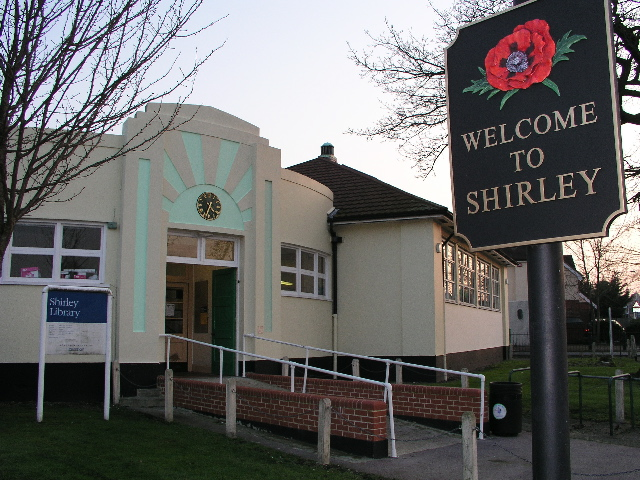
- Shirley Library

- Location within Greater London
- Population: 14,296 (ward, 2011)
- OS grid reference: TQ361658
  - Charing Cross: 10 mi (16 km) NNW
- London borough: Croydon
- Ceremonial county: Greater London
- Region: London
- Country: England
- Sovereign state: United Kingdom
- Post town: CROYDON
- Postcode district: CR0
- Dialling code: 020
- Police: Metropolitan
- Fire: London
- Ambulance: London
- UK Parliament: Croydon East
- London Assembly: Croydon and Sutton

Shirley is an area of south London, England, within the London Borough of Croydon. It lies north of Spring Park and Addington, east of Addiscombe, south of Monks Orchard and west of West Wickham, and 10 miles south-southeast of Charing Cross. Prior to the creation of Greater London in 1965, Shirley was in the administrative county of Surrey.

The Shirley area is split into Shirley proper (centred on Wickham Road), Shirley Oaks (to the north) and Upper Shirley (to the west); the suburbs of Monks Orchard and Spring Park are sometimes also considered to be sub-districts of Shirley.

== History ==
The name Shirley, first recorded in 1314, is thought to mean "shire clearing", referring to its position adjacent to the traditional Kent-Surrey border, though it may instead mean "bright clearing". It was long a small hamlet, with a large mansion (Shirley House) being built here in 1721; this was purchased by the businessman and member of parliament, John Maberley, in the mid-1800s. Around this period the population was growing, with more housing being built. St John's Church was built in 1856 to serve the needs of the growing community, replacing a smaller chapel dating from 1835.

Shirley House was converted into the Shirley Park Hotel in 1912. In the 1930s. House building in the area rapidly expanded, largely consisting of suburban-style semi-detached houses, with the Monks Orchard estate also being built in this period. However some land escaped the building boom; Shirley Park Hotel was bought by the Whitgift Foundation in 1965 to become Trinity School in a new building constructed on the site.

Neighbouring the Trinity School grounds is Shirley Park Golf Course. To the south of Shirley are large areas of woodland, including Addington Hills and Threehalfpenny Wood. Parks and open spaces are dotted across the area, including Miller's Pond in Spring Park. Central Shirley (along Wickham Road) contains a library, several shops and restaurants and two pubs - The Crown and the Shirley Inn.

== Shirley Oaks ==
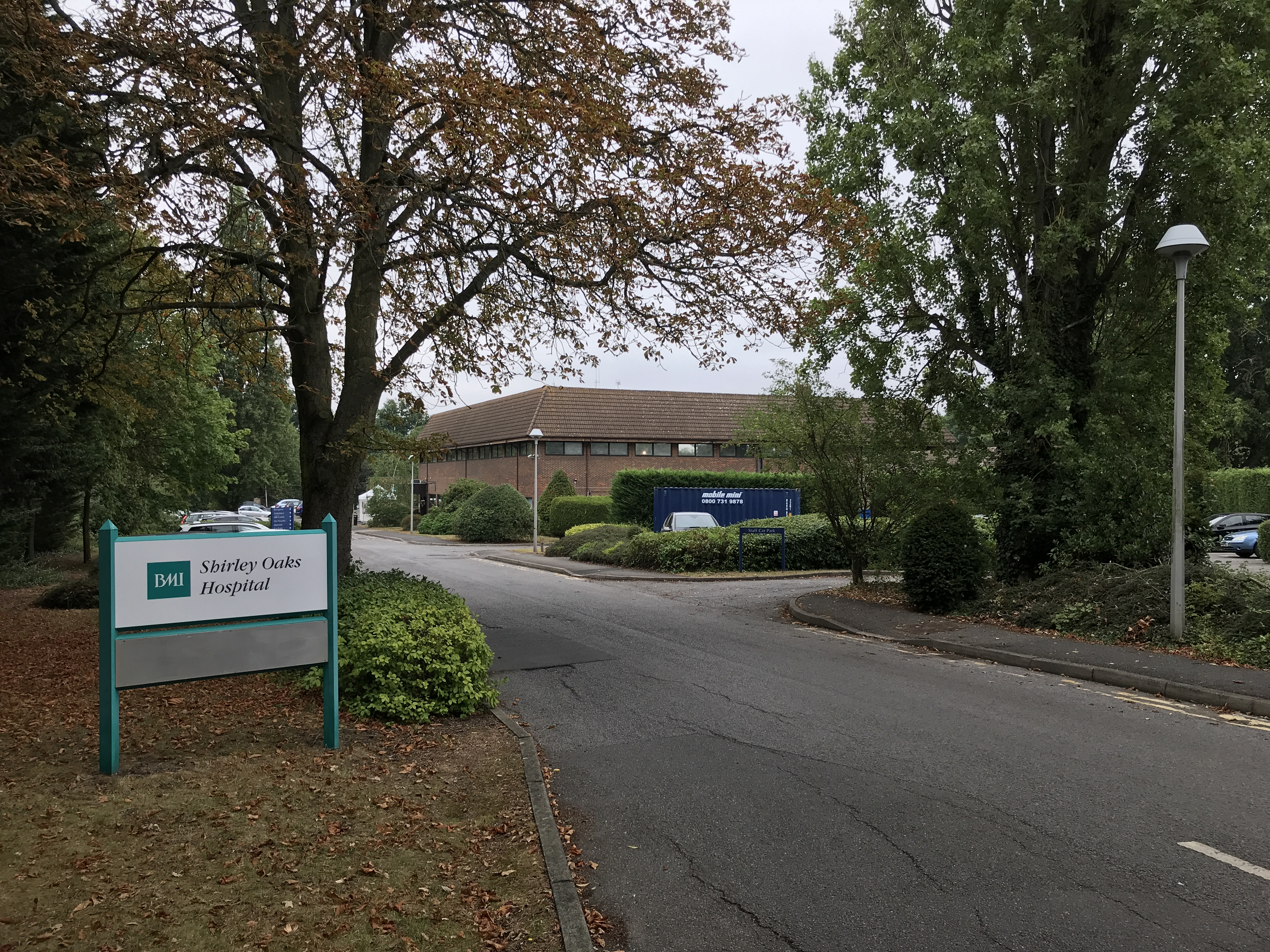
Shirley Oaks Hospital, built on the site of the former Children's Home

Shirley Oaks is situated north of central Shirley, abutting Monks Orchard. The land here was traditionally the property of the Archbishop of Canterbury. The area gets its name from Oaks Farm, which lay here circa 1800. The area began to be developed in the early 20th century, with the opening of the Shirley Oaks Children's Home in 1903. Following the closure of the Home in 1982, the site was demolished and replaced with modern housing by Heron Homes. Part of the site was set aside for Shirley Oaks Hospital, a private healthcare centre which opened in 1986.

=== Shirley Oaks Children's Home ===
The Shirley Oaks Children's Home opened in 1903 and was run by the London Borough of Lambeth until its closure in 1982. It was the largest in the country. The children's home consisted of 38 cottages on an 80 acres (32 ha) site; it contained its own school. In 2014 allegations of abuse emerged, and the Shirley Oaks Survivors Association (SOSA) was set up. Between then and 2020, 1,760 people have described suffering sexual, physical and racial abuse while at the home. Children were "drugged, tortured and sexually assaulted." The Independent Inquiry into Child Sexual Abuse "heard that despite widespread mistreatment of children, the authority (Lambeth Council) failed to investigate any allegations at the time."

The Metropolitan Police inquiry, Operation Midland, which examined all the borough's children's homes, concluded at least 35 men and women had abused children over a 20-year period. SOSA believes that over a 60-year period, over 120 abusers were involved.

To compensate victims of the abuse at Shirley Oaks (and also Lambeth Children's Home), Lambeth Council has set up a Redress Scheme open until January 2022. The scheme is assisted by child abuse lawyers Ann Olivarius and Jeff Anderson of AO Advocates. As of January 2020, £30.7 million has been paid directly to victims.

== Upper Shirley ==
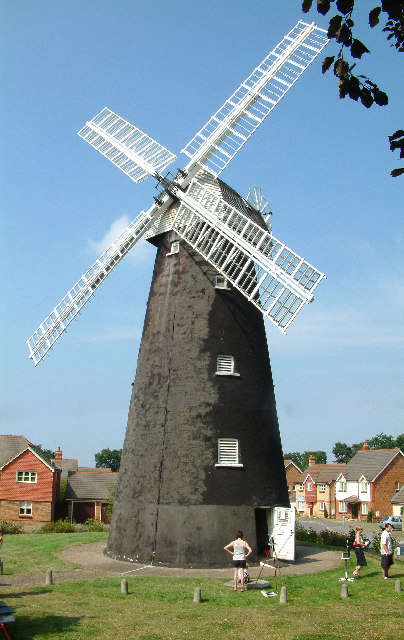
The Shirley Windmill

Upper Shirley is situated to the south-west of Shirley proper and is centred on the junction of Upper Shirley Road and Oaks Road, adjacent to the Addington Hills and Shirley Park and Addington golf courses. The settlement is thought to have originated in the mid-18th century, originally under the name "Badger's Hole". The area was home to a brewery in the mid-18th century. In 1865, the Surprise pub opened. There was another pub in the area – The Sandrock – which was located at the junction of Upper Shirley Road with Sandpits Road, which closed in 2018. The area is largely affluent, especially along Bishops Walk.

=== Shirley Windmill ===
Upper Shirley's most prominent landmark is the tower mill, which was built by Richard Alwen to replace the first mill on the site (built by his grandfather William Alwen in 1808) after it burnt down in 1854. By 1893, Alfred Rayson, the owner, was forced to abandon the mill as unviable. After closure the mill was allowed to deteriorate, being struck by lightning in 1899 and again in 1906.

In 1951, the mill and land were acquired by the Croydon Corporation. The mill was threatened with demolition when the new John Ruskin School was built but it was protected by its Grade II listed status and strong public interest. The school, now the John Ruskin College, later left the site and housing was built around the mill.

In August 1996, it was announced that the London Borough of Croydon was to receive a grant of £218,100 from the Heritage Lottery Fund for the mill. The grant money has helped restore the mill to working order and open it to the public.

Shirley Windmill is open to the public on the first Sunday of each month June to October open in May on National Mills weekend (Sunday) and usually open for the annual Open House Weekend (Sunday) in September.

== Local schools ==
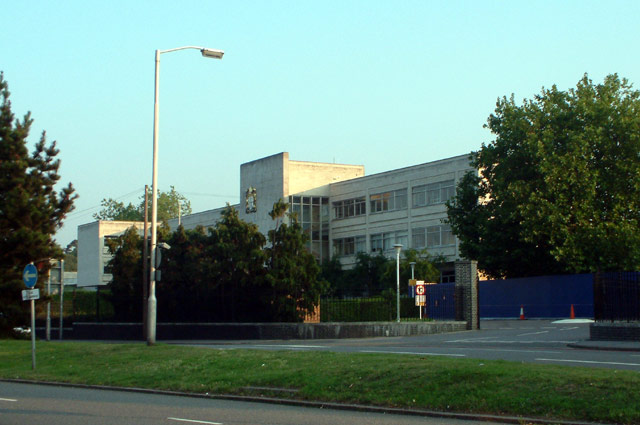
Trinity School of John Whitgift

=== Primary schools ===
- Forest Academy
- Harris Primary Academy Benson
- Monks Orchard Primary School
- Orchard Way Primary School
- St John's Church of England Primary School

=== Secondary schools ===
- Coloma Convent Girls' School
- Orchard Park High School
- Shirley High School
- Trinity School of John Whitgift

== Notable residents ==
- John Maberly (1770–1839), Member of Parliament and owner of Shirley Park.
- William Wilks (1843–1923), Vicar of Shirley, developed the Shirley poppy, a common garden variety of the plant.
- George Pilkington Mills (1867–1945), noted cyclist.
- Ronnie Corbett (1930–2016), comedian, lived in Shirley for many years and died at Shirley Oaks Hospital.
- John Surtees (1934–2017), world champion motor racing driver and motor cycle rider, grew up in Shirley.
- Tom Wright (born 1957), architect, designed the Burj Al Arab in Dubai.
- Ian Wright (born 1963), footballer, formerly lived on Bishop's Walk.
- Ben Haenow (born 1985), singer and X Factor winner, grew up in Shirley.

== Gallery ==
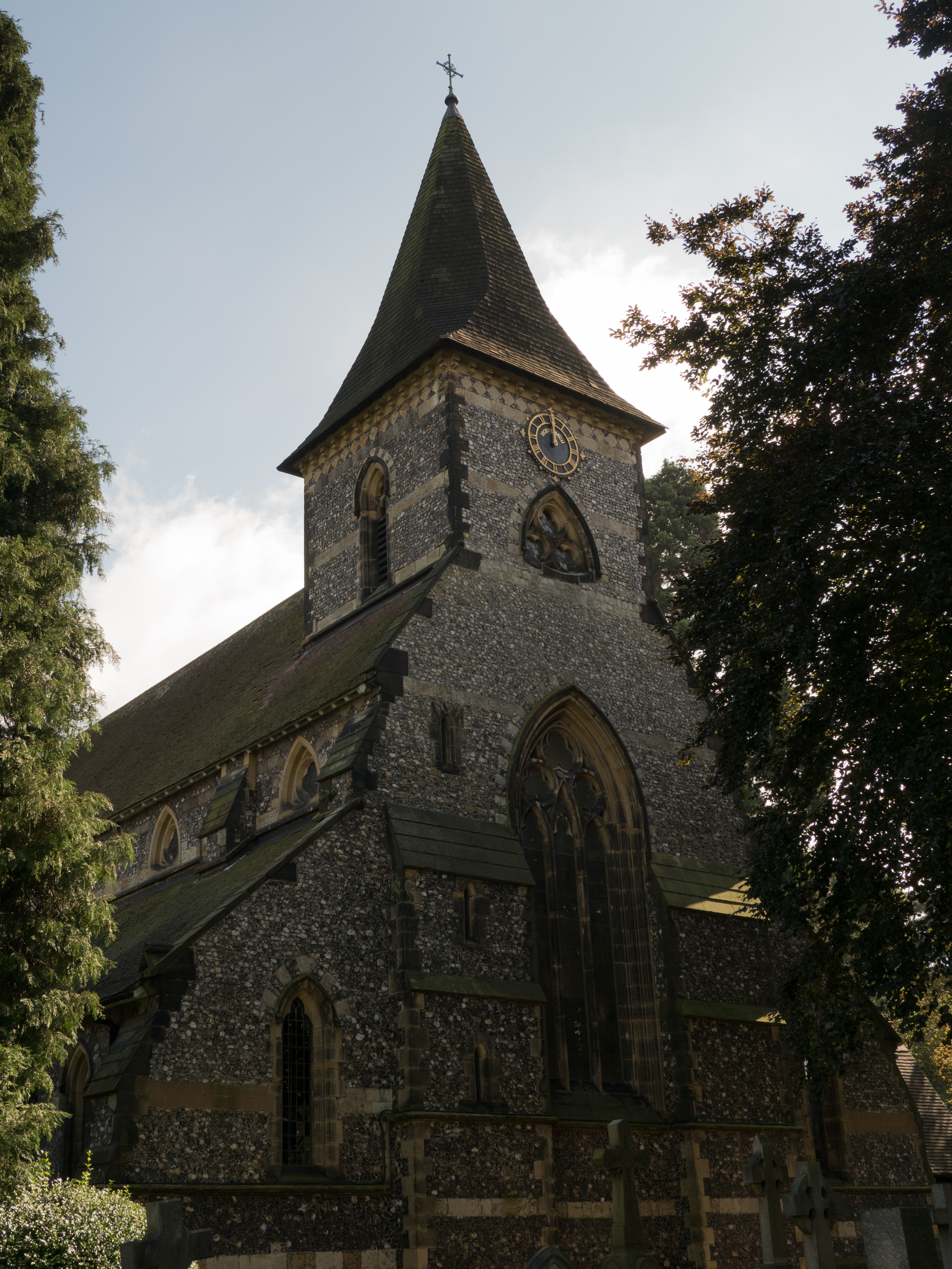
St John's Church, Shirley

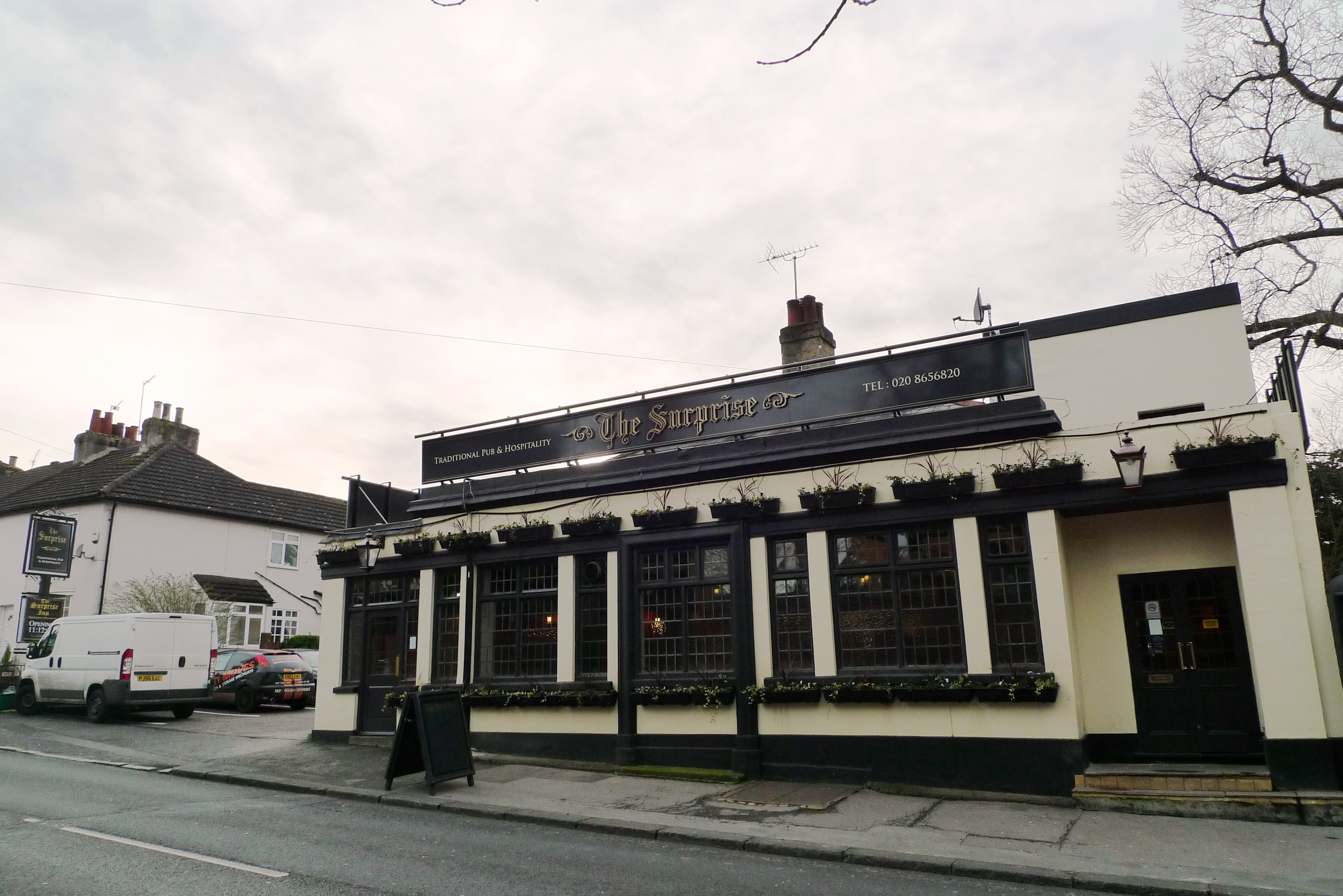
The Surprise Inn, Upper Shirley

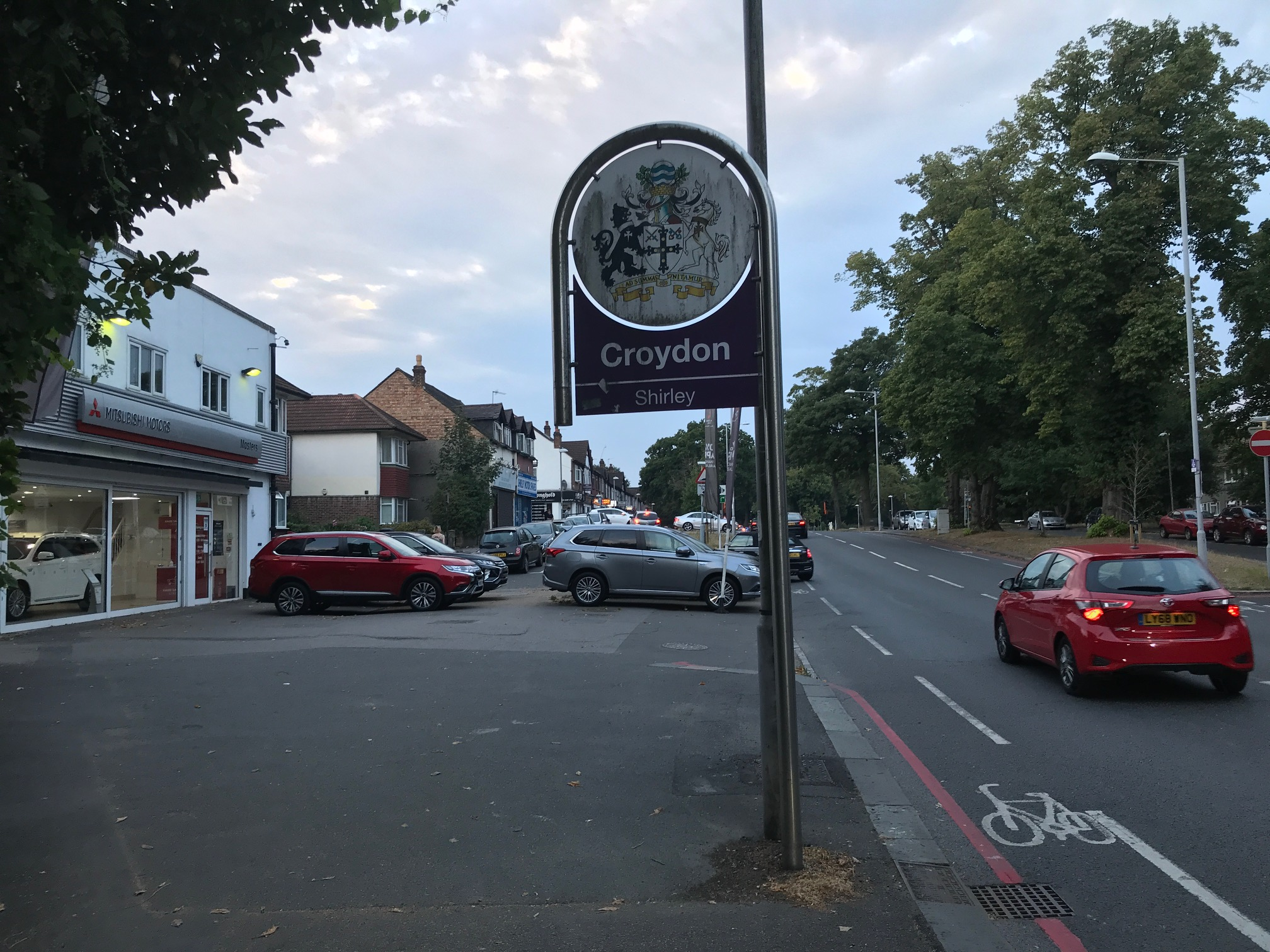
Shops on the eastern end of Wickham Road

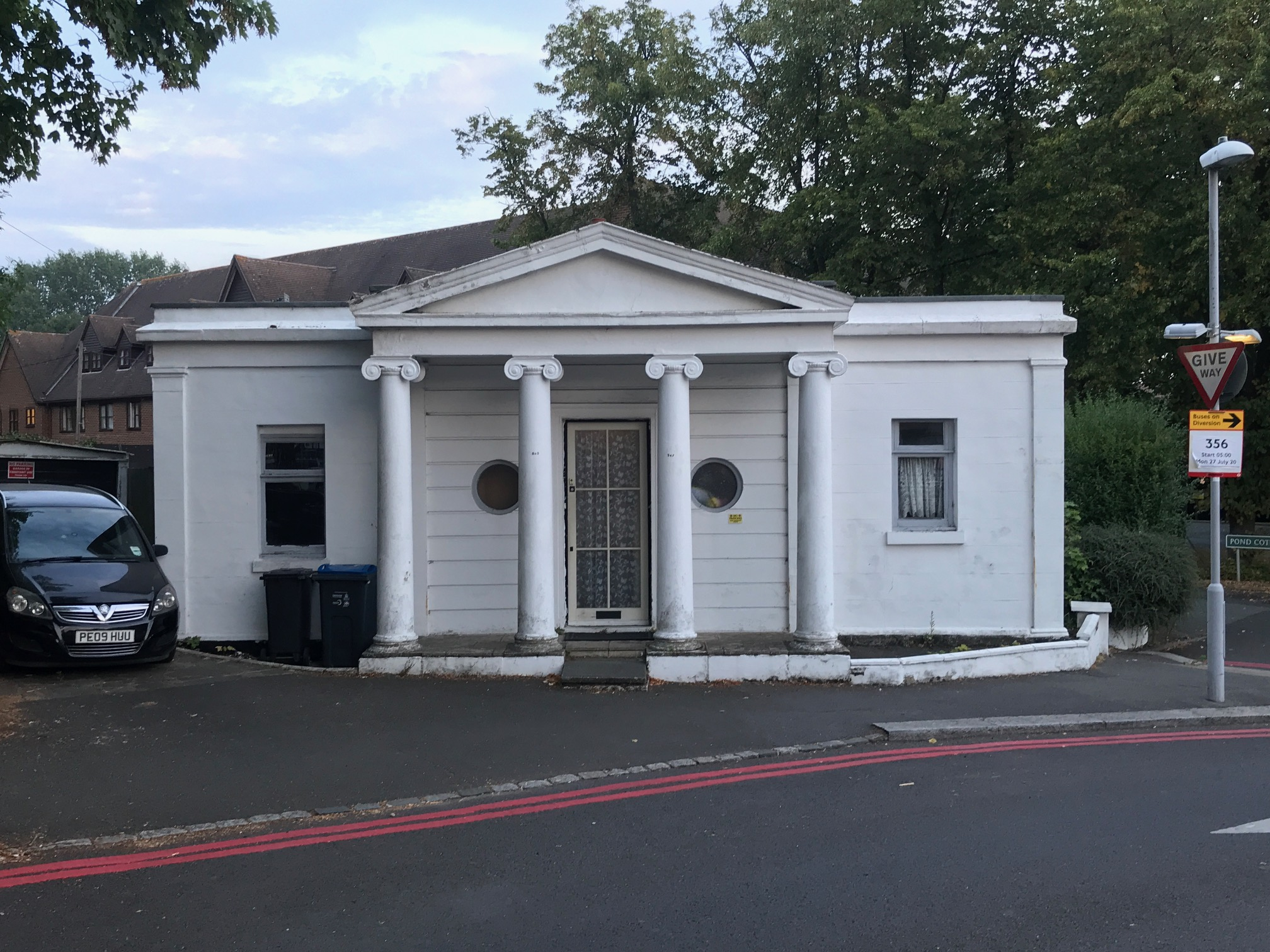
The White Lodge, a grade II listed building dating to 1840

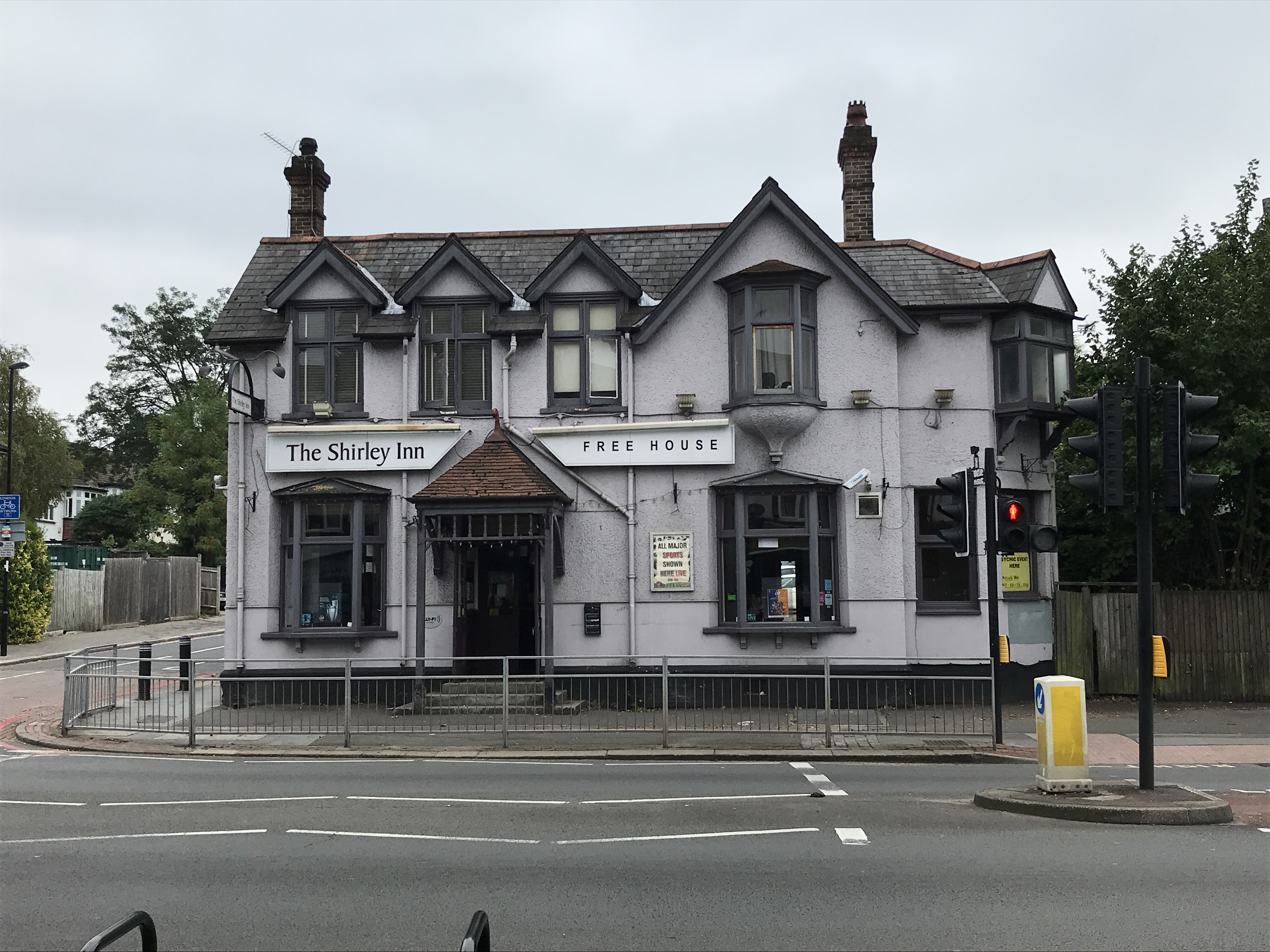
The Shirley Inn pub

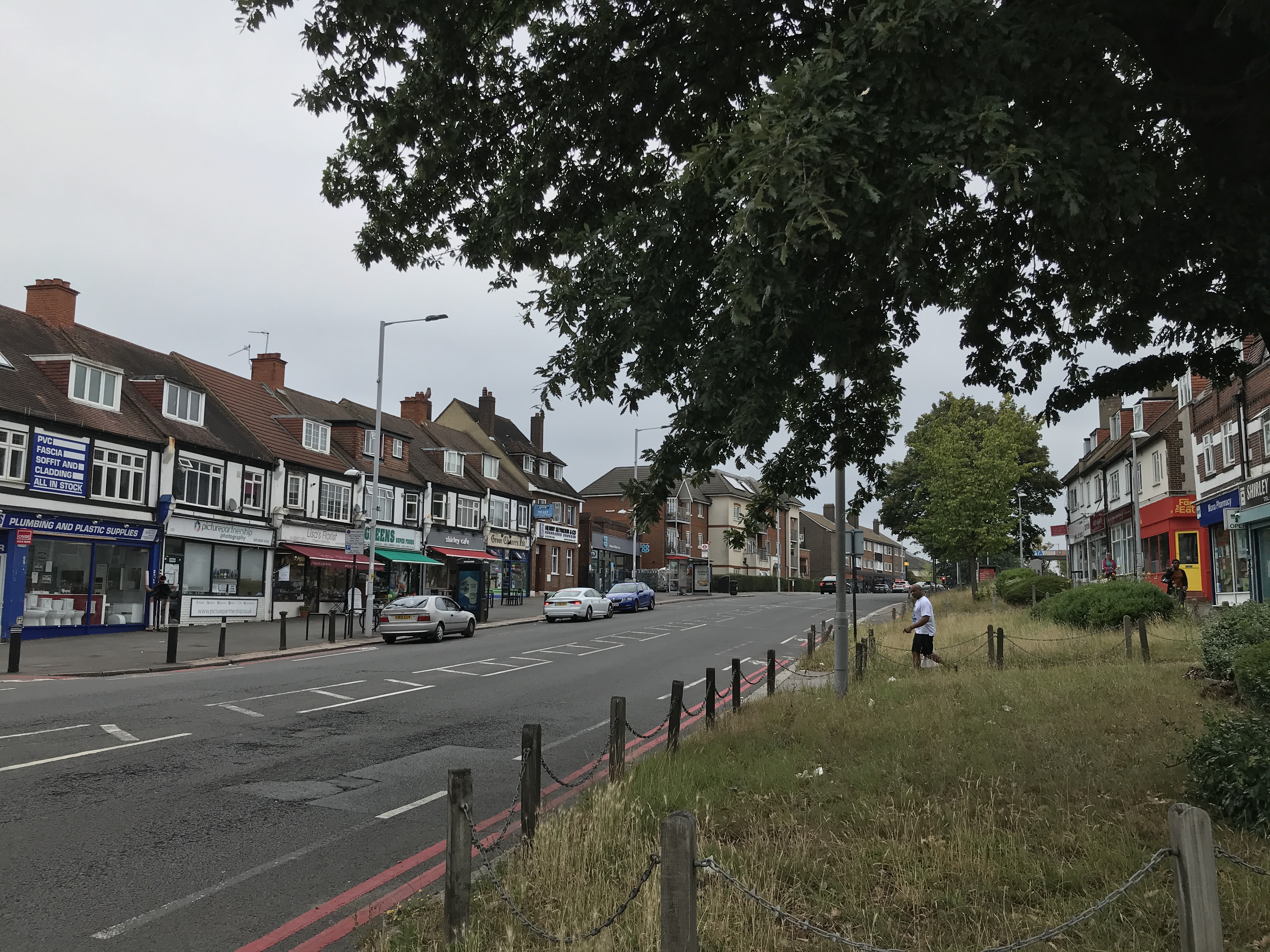
Shops at the western end of Wickham Road
