= Orchard Park High School, Croydon =

Orchard Park High School
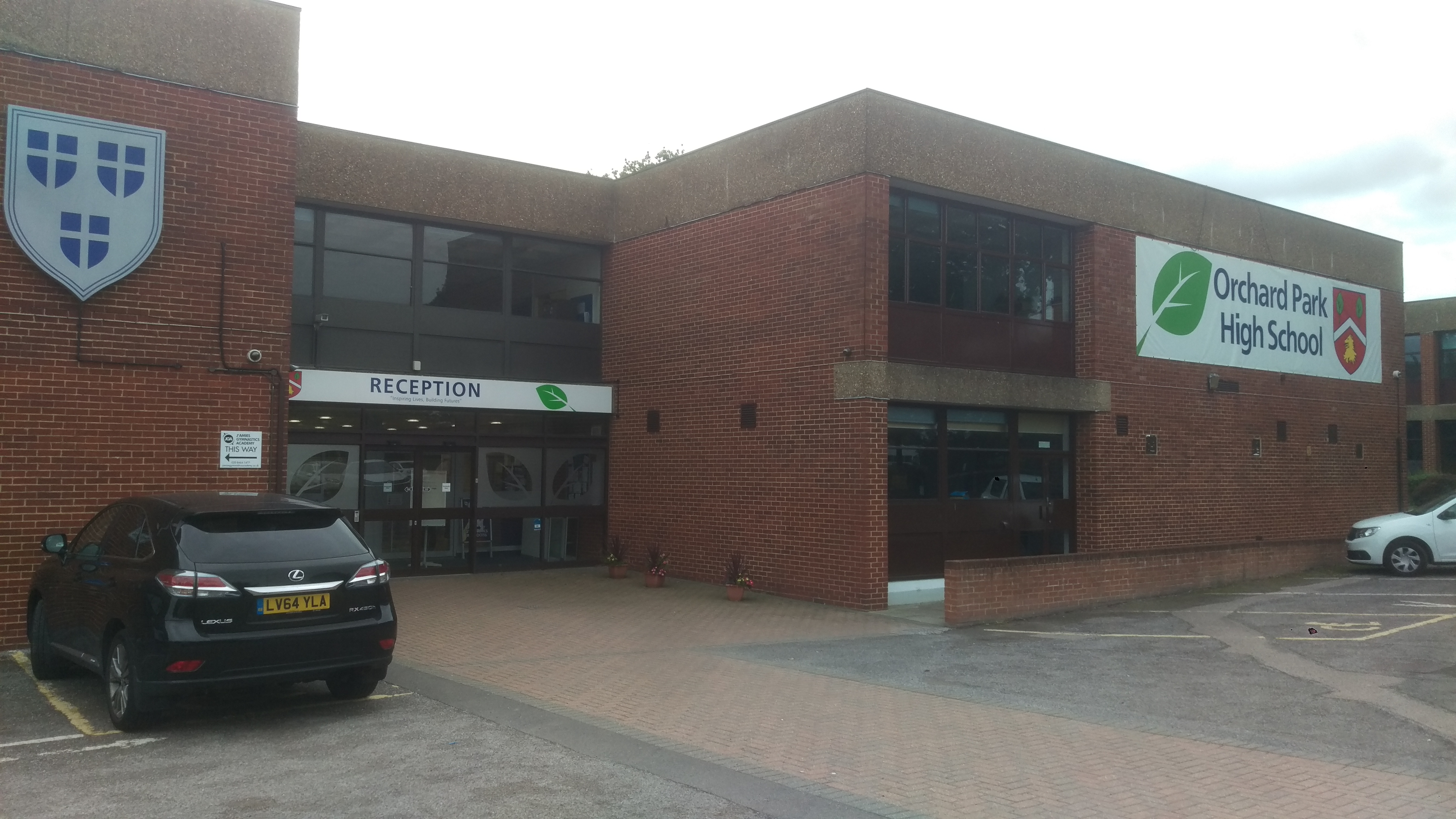

Location
- Orchard Way, Shirley; Croydon, Greater London, CR0 7NJ; England
- Coordinates: 51°23′01″N 00°02′20″W

Information
- Former name: Edenham High School
- Type: Academy
- Motto: The Best Chance of Success
- Local authority: Croydon London Borough Council
- Trust: Greenshaw Learning Trust
- Department for Education URN: 142040 Tables
- Ofsted: Reports
- Head teacher: Carly Moran
- Gender: Mixed
- Age range: 11–16
- Enrolment: 641 (2025)
- Capacity: 650
- Houses: Sir David Attenborough, Stephen Hawking, Rosa Parks, Marcus Rashford, Malala Yousafzai
- Website: www.orchardparkhigh.co.uk

Orchard Park High School (formerly Edenham High School) is an 11–16 mixed, secondary school with academy status in Shirley, Croydon, Greater London, England. It was formerly a foundation school and became an academy in September 2015. It adopted its present name in September 2017 and is part of the Greenshaw Learning Trust.

== History ==
Orchard Park High School was formerly a foundation school known as Edenham High School. It was Croydon's last remaining local authority secondary school, until it became an academy as part of the Greenshaw Learning Trust in September 2015. It changed its name to Orchard Park High School with a new badge and uniform in September 2017. The changes represent its location in the Monks Orchard community and the heritage of the school site, with elements of the previous landowners family crests used.

== Notable alumni ==
Edenham High School

- Ben Haenow, singer
- Joshua Buatsi, professional boxer
- Feroz Abbasi, former Guantanamo Bay detainee

== Notable staff ==
- Gavin McGowan, former PE teacher
