= Rhododendron 'President Roosevelt' =

Plant cultivar

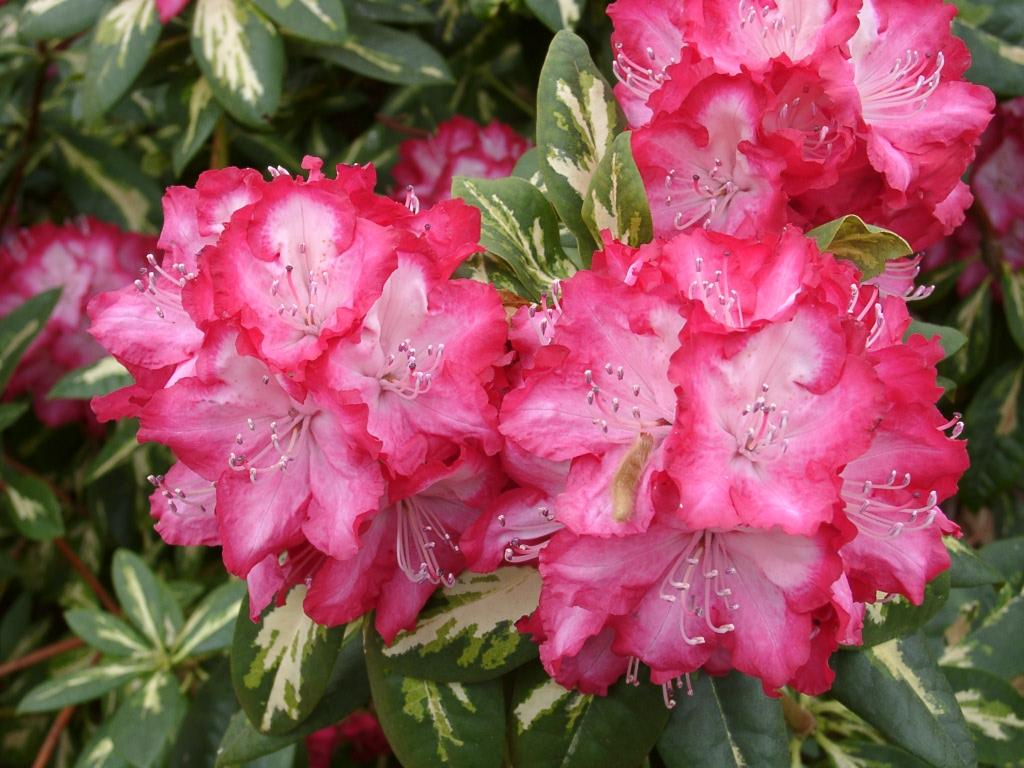
- Hybrid parentage: Rhododendron hybrid Parents unknown
- Cultivar: 'President Roosevelt'
- Origin: Netherlands, 1920s

Rhododendron 'President Roosevelt' is a popular cultivar of Rhododendron with striking variegated leaves and trusses of bright red flowers that fade to white in the centre. It is named after the 26th president of the United States, Theodore Roosevelt. Height 150–180 cm.
