= List of active Thames sailing barges =

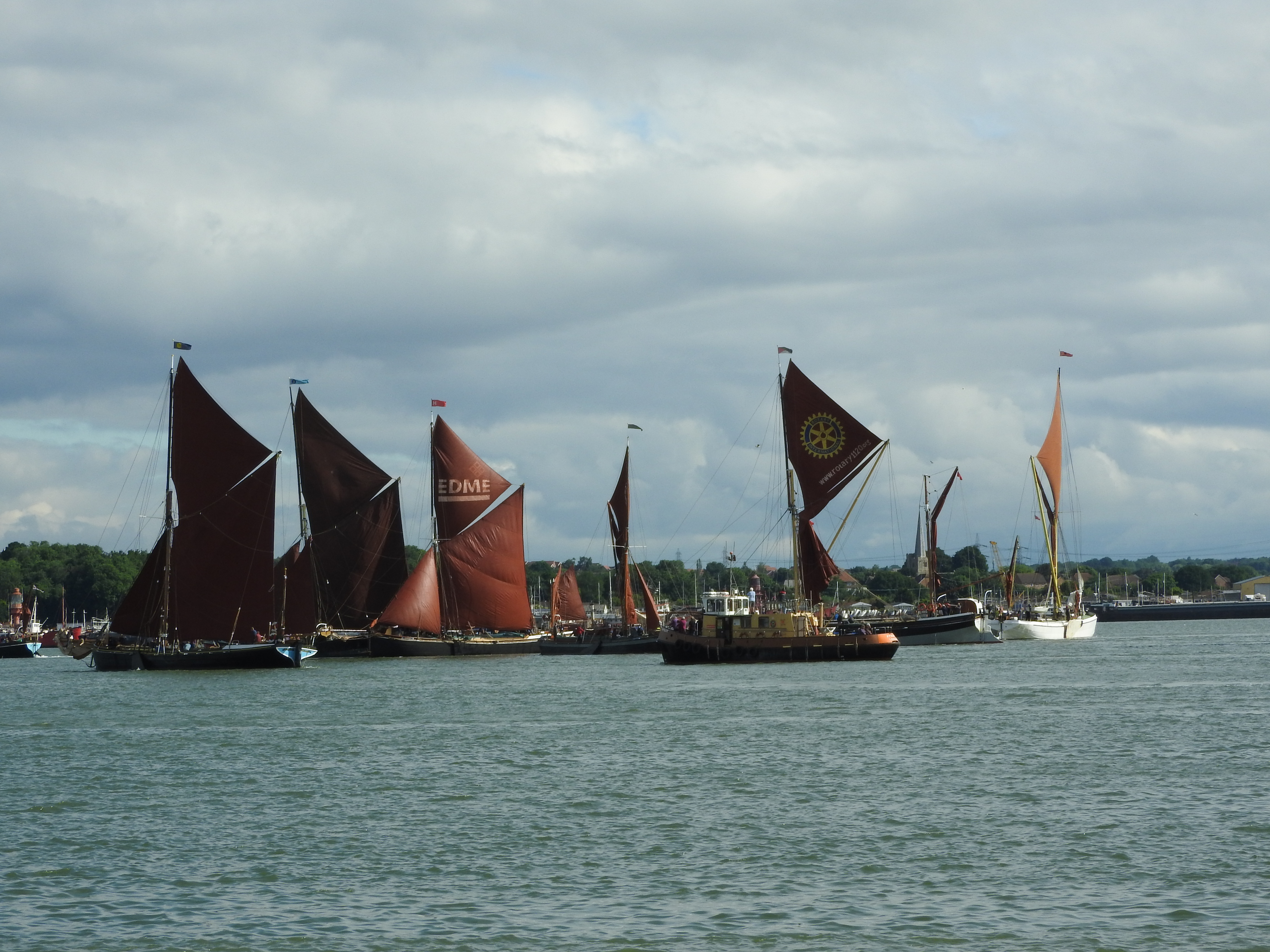
Five barges on the Medway June 2017

A Thames sailing barge is a type of commercial sailing boat once common on the River Thames in London. The flat-bottomed barges with a shallow draught and leeboards, were perfectly adapted to the Thames Estuary, with its shallow waters and narrow tributary rivers. The larger barges were seaworthy vessels, and were the largest sailing vessel to be handled by just two men.

The average size was about 120 tons and they carried 4,200 square feet (390 m^{2}) of canvas sail in six working sails. The mainsail was loose-footed and set up with a sprit, and was brailed to the mast when not needed. It is sheeted to a horse, as are the foresails so need no attention when going about. The topsail was the main working sail in heavy weather, the upper reaches of the rivers and constricted harbours. It is controlled from the deck by halliards, in-hauls and sheets. The mizzen boom is sheeted down to the rudder- assisting the helm. The masts are mounted in tabernacles so they can be lowered to shoot bridges with little loss of headway. The bowsprit where fitted could be 'topped' where space was limited.

== List of Thames barges sailing in the 110th Medway match 2018 ==
- Adieu (1929)
- Ardwina (1908)
- Edith May (1906)
- Edme (1898)
- Ironsides (1900)
- Kitty (1895)
- Lady of the Lea (1931)
- Marjorie (1902)
- Mirosa (1892)
- Niagara (1898)
- Pudge (1922)
- Reminder (1929)
- Xylonite (1926)

== List of Thames barges on the National Historic Ships list ==
- Atrato:(1898):
- Convoy:(1900): not active
- Dawn:(1897) :
- Decima:(1899)
- Dinah:(1887) :
- Edith May:(1906) :
- Fertile: (1935):
- Fraternity:(1902) : not active
- Greta:(1892) : National Historic Fleet
- Hydrogen:(1906) :
- Lady Jean:(1926) :
- Lady Daphne:(1923) :
- May:(1891) : National Historic Fleet
- Nellie:(1901) :
- Olive May:(1920) : not active
- Orinoco:(1895) :
- Phoenician:(1922) : not active
- Scone:(1919) :
- Seagull ll:(1901) : National Historic Fleet
- Tollesbury:(1901):
- Vicunia:(1912) : not active
- Westmoreland: (1900) :
- Wilfred:(1926) :

== List of Thames barges illustrated by images on Commons ==
A

- Adieu (1929)
- Alice (1954)
- Ardwina (1908)

B

- Beric (1896)

C

- Cabby (1928)
- Cambria (1906)
- Celtic (1903)
- Centaur (Essex)(1895)
- Centaur (Rochester)(1898)
- Cygnet (1881)

D

- Decima (1899)

E

- Edith May (1906)
- Edme (1898)
- Ethel Ada (1903)

G

- George Smeed (1882)
- Gladys (1901)
- Greta (1892)

H

- Henry (1904)
- Hydrogen (1906)

I

- Ironsides (1900)
- Kitty (1895)

L

- Lady Daphne (1923)
- Lady of the Lea (1931)

M

- Maria Hope
- Marjorie (1902)
- Melissa (1899)
- Mirosa (1892)

N

- Niagara (1898)

P

- Pamlinda
- Pudge (1922)

R

- Raybel (1920)
- Repertor (1924)

S

- Sherwin
- Spartan (1895)

T

- Thalatta (1906)
- Thistle (1895)

V

- Vigilant (1904)

W

- Whippet of London 1905)
- Will (1925)
- William and Ann
- Wyvenhoe (1898)

X

- Xylonite (1926)

== List of Thames barges sailing built in 2019 ==
- Blue Mermaid (2019)

Snark (2016-9)

== See also ==
- Hibernia (1906)
