= SB Cambria =

Preserved spritsail barge

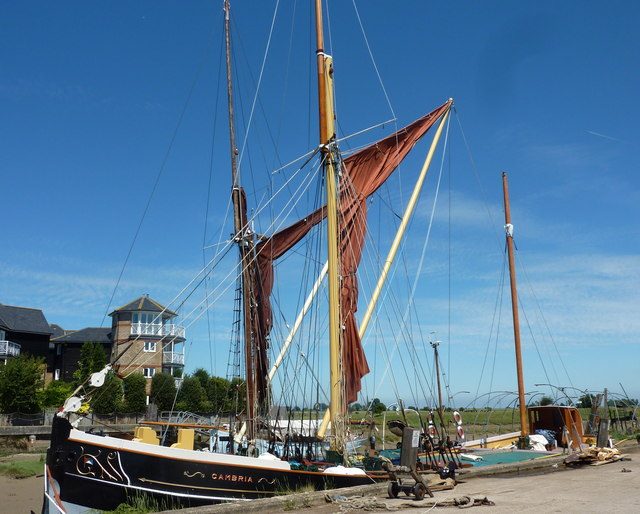
- Cambria at Standard Quay in Faversham

History

United Kingdom
- Name: Cambria
- Owner: Cambria Trust
- Operator: Cambria Trust
- Ordered: Frederick T Eberhardt (Everard Shipbuilders), Greenhithe
- Builder: William Eberhardt
- Commissioned: 1906
- Decommissioned: 1970
- Identification: Official Number 120676
- Status: Museum barge open to the public, used for young person sail training.

General characteristics
- Length: 90.95 ft (27.72 m)
- Beam: 22 ft (6.7 m)
- Draught: 7.75 ft (2.36 m)
- Propulsion: Sail
- Sail plan: mainsail, topsail, mizzen, foresail, jib
- Speed: 9 knots (17 km/h) maximum speed
- Capacity: 109 tonnes

SB Cambria is a preserved spritsail Thames sailing barge now used for sail training. She was the last barge to trade entirely under sail, and took her last cargo in 1970. She is now restored and owned and operated by the Cambria Trust, a registered charity under English law.

Cambria is a sister to the spritsail SB Hibernia which was lost off the coast of Norfolk on the evening of 9/10 November 1937. There have been four barges named the Cambria.

== History ==
There have been four barges named the Cambria.

- There was this barge, Cambria, Everard's 109 ton, 1906 Greenhithe built barge, 120676, which was registered in London.
- The 58 ton Cambria 068609 was built in 1877 in Brightlingsea and registered in Colchester.
- The Goldsmith barge, Cambria, 110043, was 67 tons, built in Southampton in 1899 and registered in London. It was sold to the London and Rochester Trading Company. She was a sister ship to the Decima.
- Then there was 1902 Papendrecht built 117 ton barge, Cambria, which was also eventually owned by Goldsmith had the number 115873. She was also registered in London.

Shipwright Frederick T Eberhardt had sent his sons as apprentices to Fellowes of Great Yarmouth. When they returned as journeymen he set them to work building a barge each, William to build the Cambria and Frederick the Hibernia. William built Cambria for £1895, whilst her sister barge cost £1905. She was also slightly faster than Hibernia and she came second in the coasting class in the Thames and Medway matches in 1906. "Brusher" Milton was her first skipper. He recounted one event, when she arrived in Dover, an hour ahead of a steamer which she had overtaken on her way up the channel from the Solent. "We were doing nine knots", quoted on the steamer, "and we couldn't hold you".

She was the last Thames sailing barge, to trade entirely under sail, and was owned by Captain A. W. (Bob) Roberts. Roberts sailed Cambria for more than twenty years, and gained a reputation for hard sailing and fast passages in other Everard barges.

Cambria's last mate was Dick Durham from Leigh-on-Sea, Essex, with whom Bob carried the last freight under sail alone: 100 tons of cattle cake from Tilbury Dock to Ipswich in October 1970. Dick wrote Bob Roberts' biography: The Last Sailorman.

Bob Roberts sold Cambria to the Maritime Trust in 1971, for display at St Katharine Docks in London. But she was not looked after very well and in 1987, the Maritime Trust was disbanded. It was agreed that the barge was moved to the Dolphin Sailing Barge Museum at Sittingbourne and in 1996 she was sold to the Cambria Trust for £1.

On 6 September 2007, Cambria came to Standard Quay in Faversham for restoration and rebuilding after the Barge Museum was damaged in a fire.

Her funded restoration cost a £1.4 million with help from the National Lottery.

She was re-launched into the Faversham Creek on 23 March 2011. She then underwent sea trials and then re-fitting to prepare her for use in supporting local schools and social outreach programmes.

She won the coasting class in the 2011 Thames sailing barge match.

In 2012, the 82nd Thames Sailing Barge Match took place. Cambria won again and Edith May came fifth, behind Thalatta, Lady of the Lea and Pudge. Prizes were presented by Richard Horlock and special guest Griff Rhys Jones.

In 2013 another Thames Barge Match took place. Cambria came 1st in the Coasting class.
