= Decima =

Decima can refer to:

- Decima gallery, a London-based arts organisation
- Decima (game engine), a proprietary game engine by Guerrilla Games
- Decima (mythology), a goddess in Roman mythology and one of the Parcae (Fates)
- Decima Research, a Canadian polling company
- Decima, the Roman equivalent of Lachesis, one of the Fates
- Décima, a type of poetry with ten stanzas, rooted in Spanish literature
- Décima, the one-tenth tithe in Spain that is traditionally donated to a religious institution, the tithe itself called diezmo in Spanish
- Dejima, a foreign trading post off the coast of Nagasaki, Japan, during the 16th to 19th century
- SB Decima, a Thames barge built in 1899
- The Decimas, a race of fictional creatures in the British science-fiction television series Blake's 7
- Decima Flottiglia MAS, an Italian flotilla, with commando frogman unit, of the Regia Marina (Italian Royal Navy) created during the Fascist regime
- Decima Technologies, an international Private Intelligence Agency featured on the show Person of Interest.
