= SB Edme =

English barge (1898)

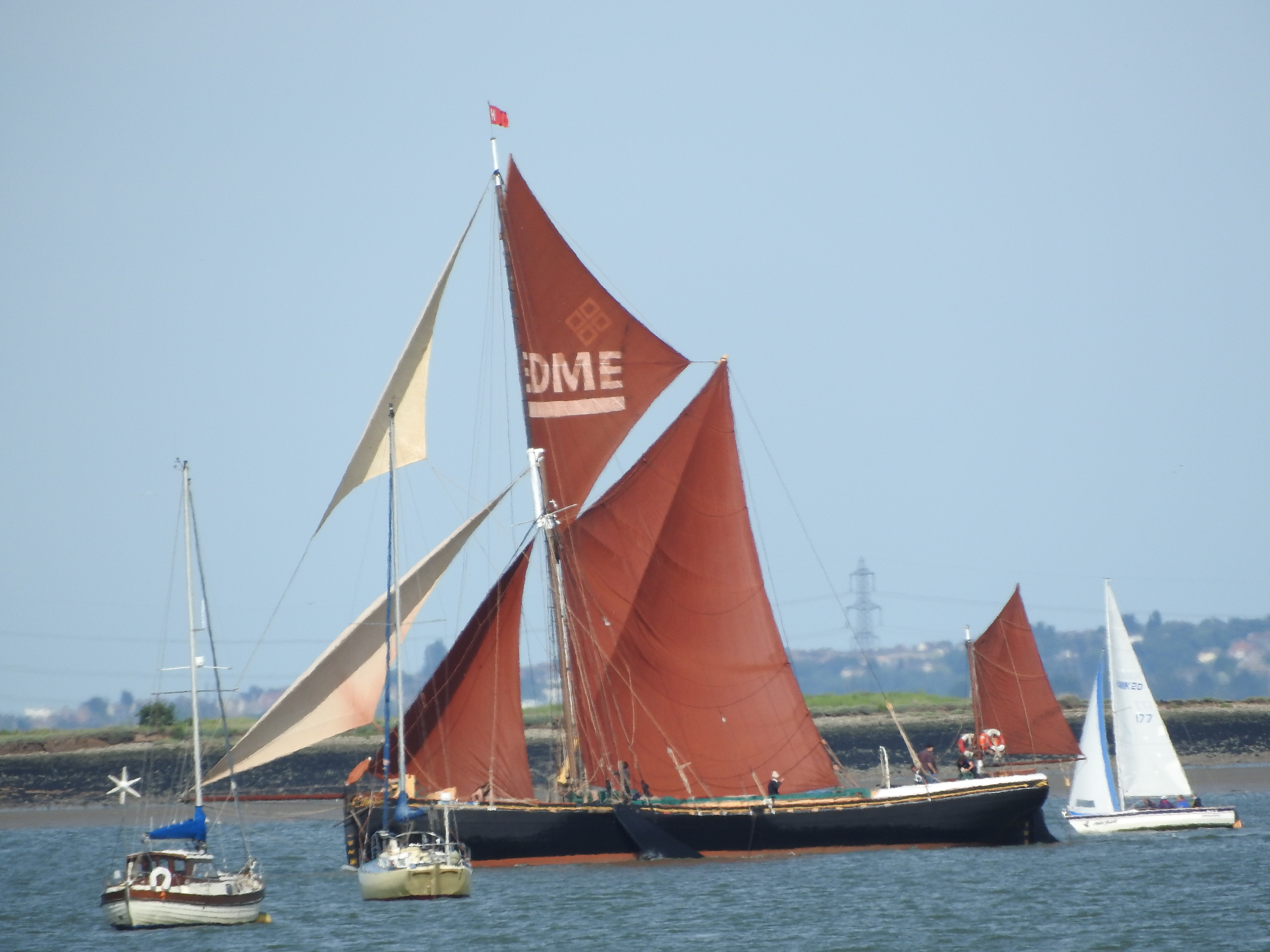
- Edme off Gillingham

History

United Kingdom
- Name: Edme after Malting's Co product, English Diastatic Malt Extract (EDME)
- Owner: Horlock family of Mistley; Ian Danskin (1971-1989)
- Builder: John and Herbert Cann of Bathside, Gashouse Creek, Harwich
- Launched: 1898
- Identification: United Kingdom Official Number 105425

General characteristics
- Class & type: Thames barge
- Tonnage: 50 GRT
- Length: 80 feet (24.38 m)
- Beam: 17.25 feet (5.26 m)
- Draught: 2.8 feet (0.85 m)
- Propulsion: Sails
- Sail plan: Spritsail
- Notes: Website=http://www.edmebarge.com

Edme is a Thames barge which was built in 1898 for the Horlocks of Mistley. She was registered in Harwich. She is one of two barges sailing today that have no auxiliary engine.

== Description ==
EDME is 80 feet 0 inches (24.38 m) long, with a beam of 17.25 feet (5.26 m) and a draught of 2.8 feet (0.85 m). She is assessed at 50 GRT.

== History ==
She was built of wood at Harwich in 1898 by Cann for F.W.Horlock. The United Kingdom Official Number 105425 was allocated. She sailed commercially until 1939 carrying malt and acid. During the 1939-1945 she served in Harwich Harbour as an anchor point for barrage balloons. In 1946 she was derigged and used as a timber lighter in Heybridge Basin. She then became a houseboat.

From 1971 there was a lengthy restoration by Ian Danskin at Maldon, Essex before she was bought by the Harman-Harrison Consortium, taken to St Osyth in 1992 and rerigged as bowsprit barge. She is now owned by EDME Consortium, and based at St Osyth. In 2013 she obtained a grant towards the cost of replacing a chine. Along with the SB Mirosa she still has no engine.

She raced in 2017 in the Thames and Medway sailing barge matches. She is notable for her shallow draught.

== See also ==
- List of active Thames sailing barges
