= SB Kitty (1895) =

Wooden Thames sailing barge

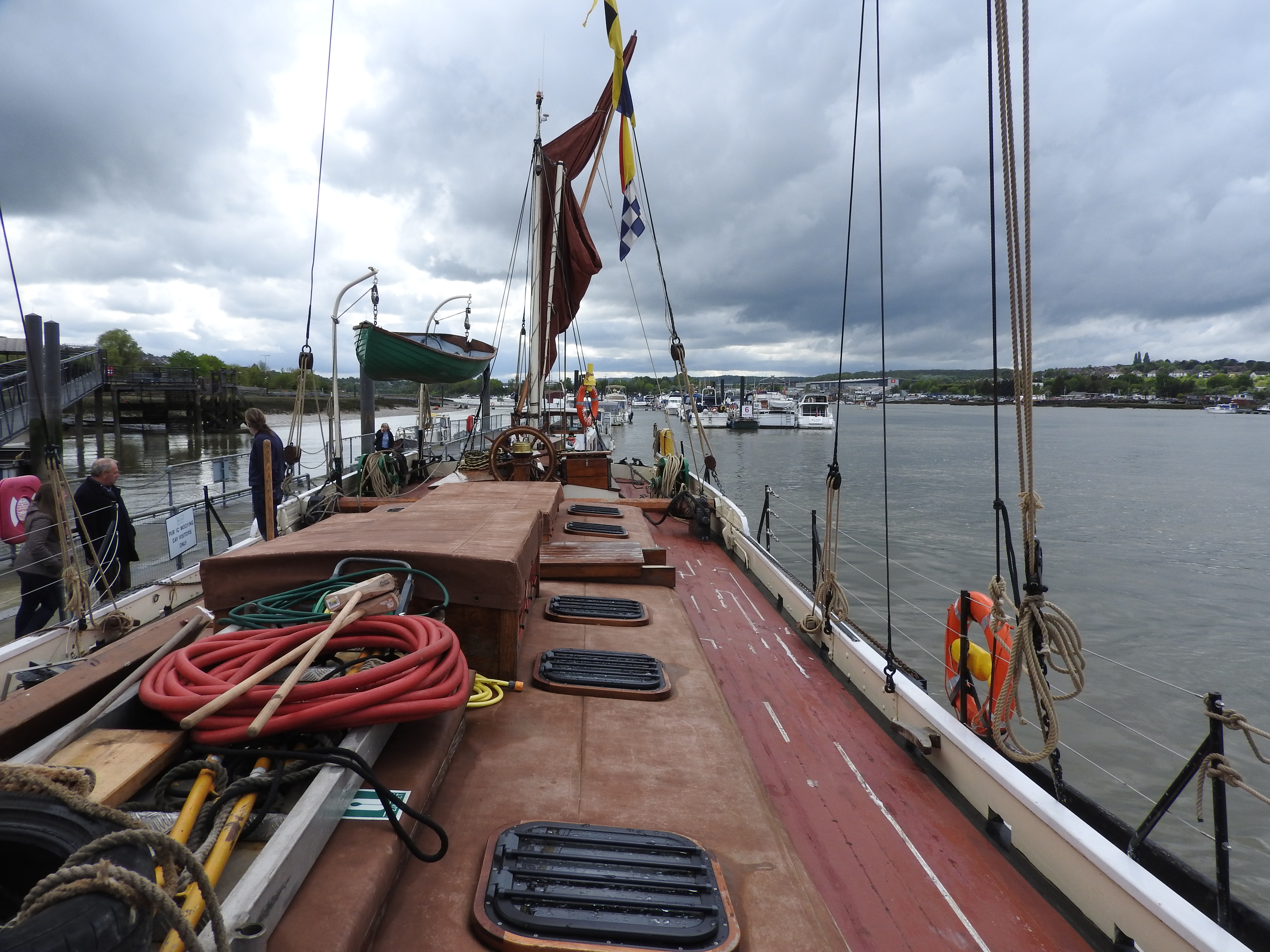
- Kitty alongside in Rochester 2017

History

United Kingdom
- Name: Kitty
- Owner: Horatio ('Raish') Horlock and three co-owners (1895-1933); Francis and Gilders (1933-1951); London and Rochester Trading Company (1951-1955); Brown & Co, of Chelmsford (1955-1961); Maldon Yacht & Barge Charter Co Ltd,(1964-1976); Patrick Keen (1985-1988); Top-sail Charters, Cooks Yard (-date)
- Builder: John and Herbert Cann, of Gashouse Creek, Harwich.
- Launched: April 1895
- Identification: Official Number 105418
- Fate: Charter yacht

General characteristics
- Class & type: Thames barge
- Tonnage: 65 GRT
- Length: 82.13 feet (25.03 m)
- Beam: 19.38 feet (5.91 m)
- Draught: 6.59 feet (2.01 m)
- Propulsion: Sails
- Sail plan: Spritsail bowsprit
- Notes: Website: http://www.top-sail.co.uk/the-barges/kitty/

Kitty is a wooden Thames sailing barge in the bowsprit class of 65 tons. She was built in Harwich in 1895. She is No. 209 on the National Historic Ships Register.

== Construction ==
There were two branches of the Horlocks family operating from Mistley. The business was grain- bringing imported Canadian grain from London to the flour mills in Essex. Horatio ('Raish') Horlock and three co-owners ordered the Kitty, he however had most of the shares

Thames barges were built for strength: Kitty was known for her speed. They had flat bottoms to allow them to be easily beached or lie on the river mud, and were rigged to allow them to be operated by two men and possibly a lad. They were built in bargeyards adjacent to a river or creek on bargeblocks- a series of trestles raised about a metre from the compacted ground, that allowed working access above and below.

The Kitty is 82.13 feet (25.03 m) long and 19.38 feet (5.91 m) broad. She is almost identical in size and layout to the well documented Kathleen. She has a double-skinned hull of oak frames and 4 inches (10 cm) oak floors, with 3-inch (1.5 inches (3.8 cm) doubled) and solid 4 inches (10 cm) pitch pine planking. Her keelson is a 70 feet (21.34 m) long piece of 16 inches (41 cm) square pine, while the Kathleen used metal.

== History ==
Kitty was built for transporting grain from London and Ipswich, but could also ship timber, malt, flour, bricks, grit and general cargoes. She was generally an estuary barge not working the East Coast or the channel.

In the First World War she transported coke and stores to Calais and Boulogne for the army then reverted to the London river and the Essex coast. She was sold in 1933 to Francis and Gilders Ltd, of Colchester, who in March 1951 merged with the London and Rochester Trading Company. She traded solely under sail until July 1955. During this period in 1949 she was involved in an accident in the Surrey Commercial Docks when her deck cargo shifted and she took a sudden list and lost it colliding with the motor coaster Grampian Coast. Though this damaged her stem, it was patched up and was sold. She then was derigged and worked as a timber lighter for Brown & Co, of Chelmsford, on the Blackwater.

Francis & Gilders, Ltd. barges in 1949
Name	Built	Year	Tons	Official no.	Notes
Alaric of London	Sandwich	1901	73	105560	ex- Shamrock
British Empire of Colchester	Brightlingsea	1899	50	109616	
Centaur of Harwich	Harwich	1895	60	99460	
Clara of London	Sittingbourne	1896	60	105829	
Colonia of Harwich	Sandwich	1897	62	105422	
Dawn of Maldon	Maldon	1897	54	105902	
Ethel Ada of Ipswich	Ipswich	1897	48	109202	
Falconet of Rochester	Strood	1899	49	110951	
George Smeed of Rochester	Murston; Murston	1882; 1922	64	84430	Rebuilt
Kitty of Harwich	Harwich	1895	65	105408	
Lady Helen of London	Rochester	1900	57	112762	
Leslie West of London	Gravesend	1898	50	104941	
Mirosa of Maldon	Maldon	1892	49	96485	ex- Ready
Saltcote Belle of Maldon	Maldon	1895	49	96490	
Varuna of London	East Greenwich	1907	59	125614	

In 1964 John Fairbrother, trading as Maldon Yacht & Barge Charter Co Ltd, bought and was re-rigged and refurbished as a twelve berth charter vessel. He raced her in the revived barge matches. She took a first in the 1974 Pin Mill class B, and in the 1975 Medway bowsprit class. Then she was bought in 1976 by David Anderson who de-rigged her and used her as floating restaurant at Hayling Island. In April 1985 she was bought was Patrick Keen of Portsmouth who re-rigged her and installed a Perkins six-cylinder diesel engine and she became a charter yacht again: now named My Kitty. In 1988 ownership passed to Microwave Exhibitions and Publishers Ltd. and in 1990 she was bought by Roger Marriott, and was renamed Kitty. She was based on the Solent and used for charter work.

In 2003 she had a new mainsail cut by James Lawrence, of Brightlingsea and she was refitted at Maldon in 2006. She has eight berths, and is licensed to take 46 passengers (plus four crew) to sea. In September 2007 she relocated to Maldon.

== Gallery ==
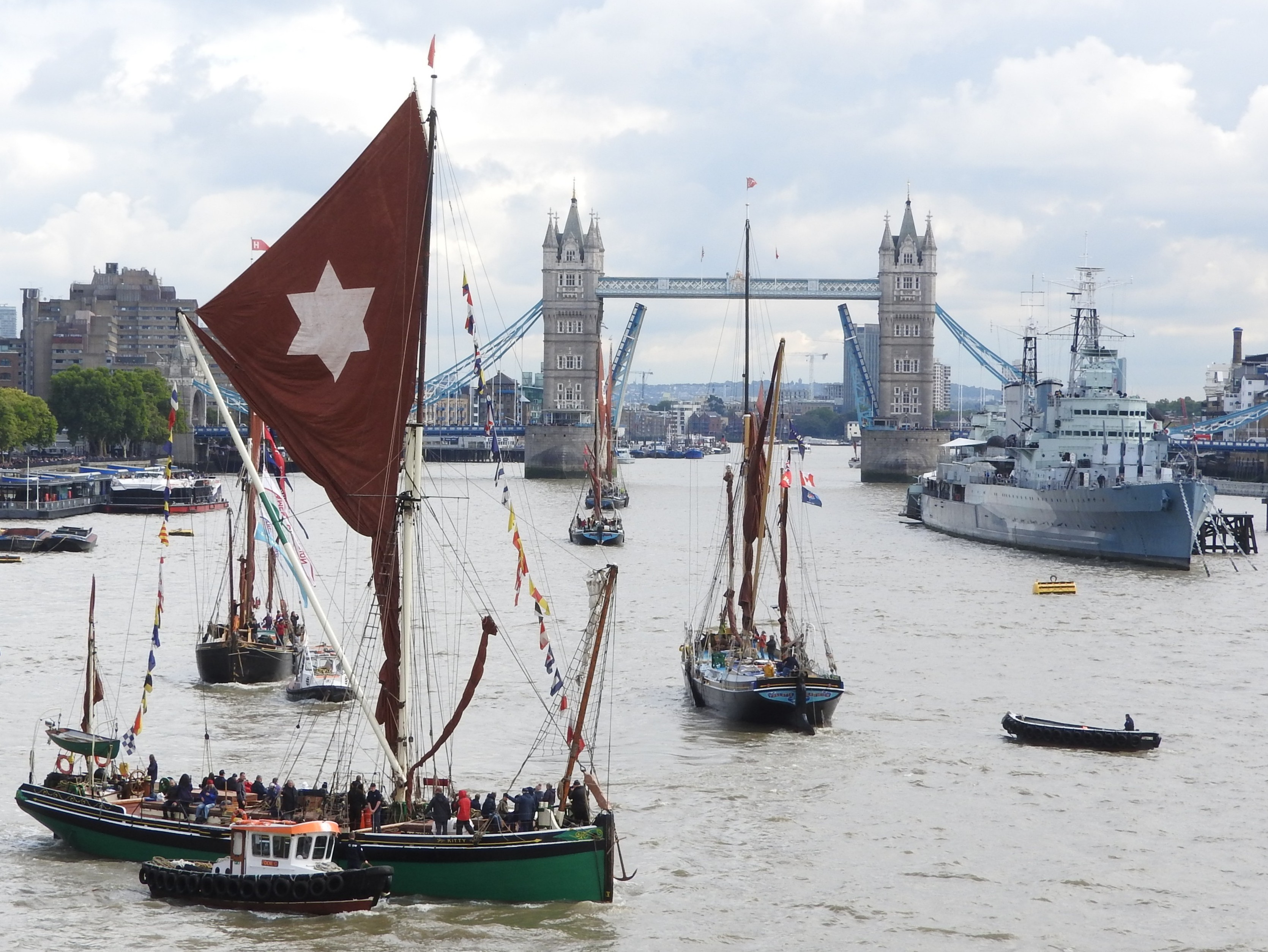
Kitty in the 2017 parade of sail

== See also ==
- List of active Thames sailing barges
