= SB Ardwina =

Wooden Thames barge, built 1909

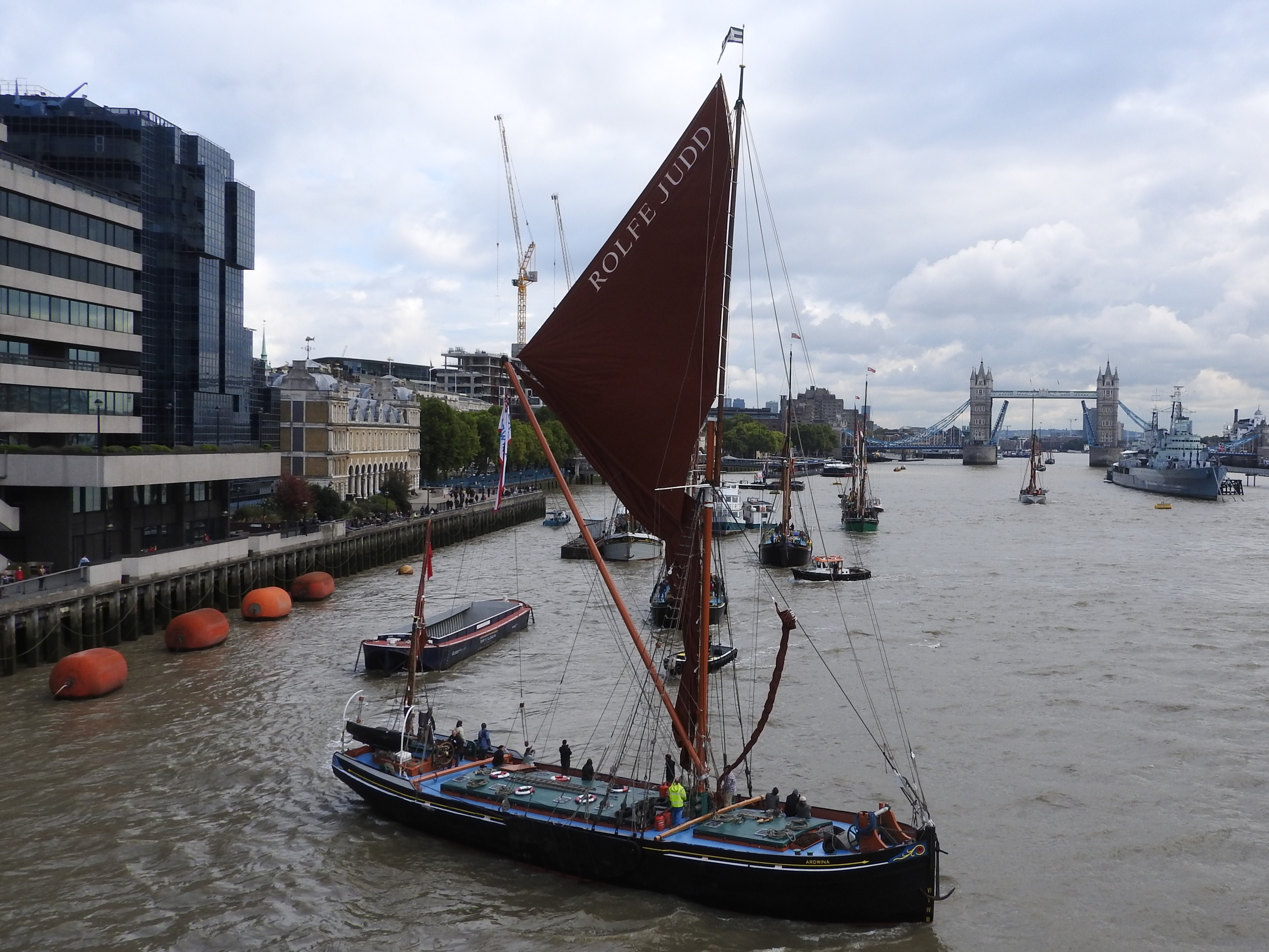
- Ardwina upstream of Tower Bridge, London. 2017

History

United Kingdom
- Name: Ardwina (1909-2018)
- Owner: E.J. & W.Goldsmith of Grays (1909-1938); Metcalf Motor Coasters(1938-1950); Daniels (1950-1959); Brian Herve (1959-1961); G.Newman of Maldon (1961-1966); J.Hunt & R. Hogben (1966-1971); J. Hunt (1971); Porter.; Rolfe-Judd (1980-2018)
- Builder: W.H. Orvis, Ipswich
- Launched: 1909
- Identification: United Kingdom Official Number 129016
- Status: Yacht barge

General characteristics
- Class & type: Thames barge
- Tonnage: 66 GRT
- Length: 85 feet (25.91 m)
- Beam: 21.1 feet (6.43 m)
- Draught: 6.4 feet (1.95 m)
- Propulsion: Sails
- Sail plan: Spritsail
- Notes: Rebuilt 1982. Last barge built at Ipswich. Based St Katharine Docks; Website=Rolfe-Judd

Ardwina was the last wooden Thames barge to be built in Ipswich. This was in 1909. She was registered in London. She worked commercially until 1956. She was laid up after a collision and restored as a yacht conversion. She is still sailing in 2018, based at St Katharine Docks, and regularly passes under Tower Bridge.

== Description ==
Ardwina is 85 feet (25.91 m) long, 21.1 feet (6.43 m) wide and has a draught of 6.4 feet (1.95 m). She was built of wood by W.H.Orvis of Ipswich for E.J. & W.Goldsmith of Grays; she is assessed at 66 GRT.

== History ==
The Ardwina sailed for many years out of Grays, working for Goldsmith's. She ran on one occasion from Grays to Calais in 10¼ hours. On another occasion she was demasted in the channel, the crew were taken off and she was put on tow. The tow rope broke twice and she drifted in the shipping lanes for four days before she was captured and towed to harbour by a French motor coaster. Following a further accident in the Thames she was bought and converted into a barge yacht.

== See also ==
- List of active Thames sailing barges

== Bibliography ==
- Carr, Frank (1951). Sailing Barges (Revised ed.). Peter Davies Ltd.
- Benham, Hervey; Kershaw, Philip; Finch, Roger (1986). Down tops'l: the story of the East Coast sailing-barges (3rd ed.). London: Harrap. ISBN 0-245-54487-9.
- March, Edgar (1948). Spritsail barges of Thames and Medway. London: Percival Marshal.
- Walsh, Richard (1986). Kathleen: the biography of a sailing barge. Lavenham: Terence Dalton. ISBN 0-86138-046-0.
