= SB Ironsides =

Thames barge

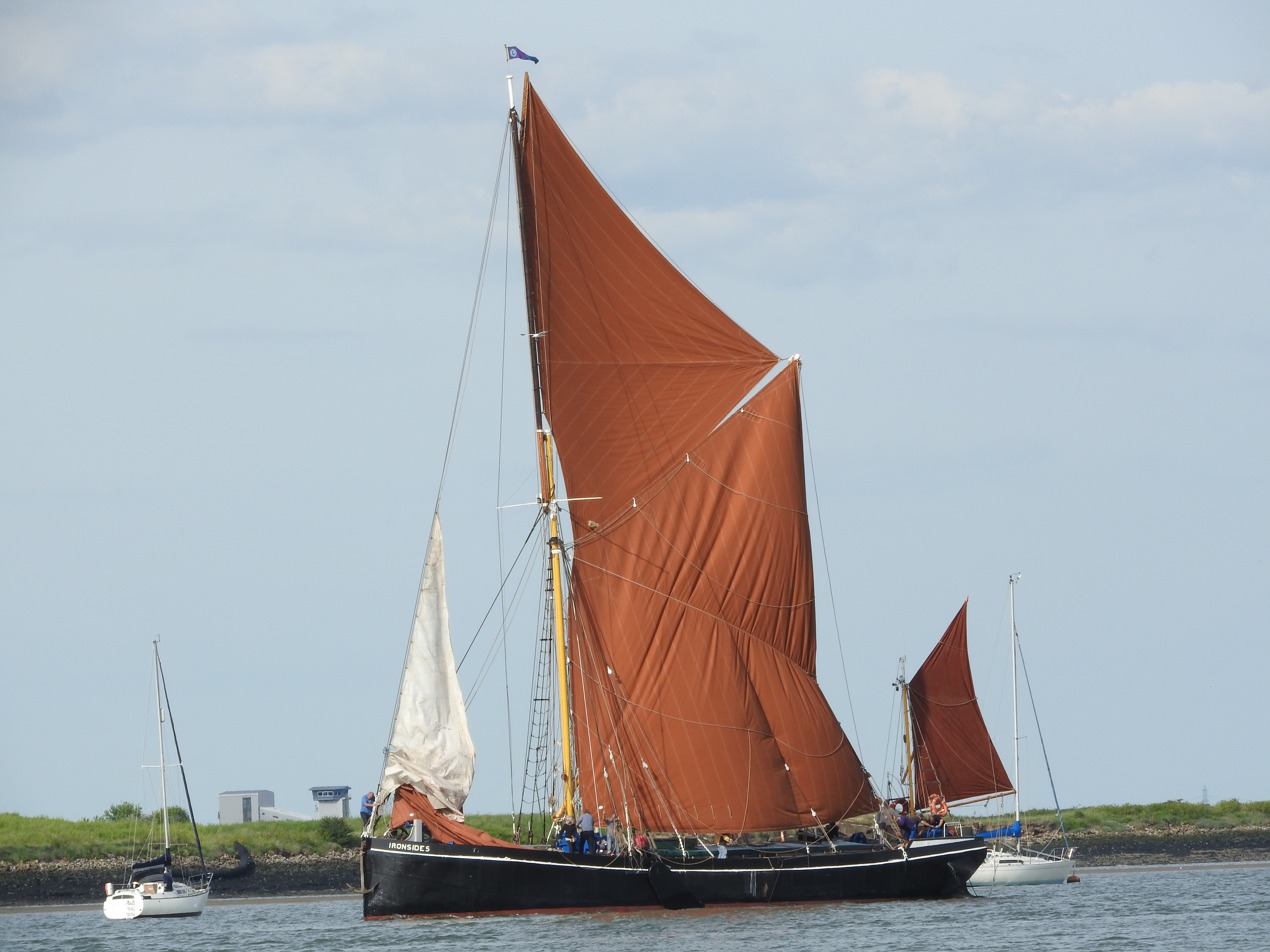
- Ironsides in Gillingham 2017

History

United Kingdom
- Owner: APCM Associated Portland Cement (1900-1928); London and Rochester Trading Company (1928-1967); Maurice O'Gill; Alan Reeky 1967
- Builder: Clarke & Stanfield, Grays, Essex
- Launched: May 1900
- Identification: United Kingdom Official Number 112271

General characteristics
- Class & type: Thames barge
- Tonnage: 78 GRT
- Length: 84 feet (25.60 m)
- Beam: 20.3 feet (6.19 m)
- Draught: 6.4 feet (1.95 m)
- Propulsion: Sails
- Sail plan: Spritsail
- Notes: Website=https://ironsidessailingbarge.co.uk/

Ironsides is an iron-hulled Thames barge which was built in 1900 for APCM. She was registered in London. A 60 hp auxiliary engine was fitted in 1939.

== Description ==
Ironsides is 84 feet (25.60 m) long, with a beam of 20.3 feet (6.19 m) and a draught of 6.4 feet (1.95 m)

== History ==
Ironsides was built by Clarke & Stanfield, Grays, Essex in 1900 for the Associated Portland Cement and carried stone from Portland to London under sail alone. In 1928 she was sold to the London and Rochester Trading Company, who with 120 barges were the second largest barge owner in the country. Currently (2018) Ironsides is based in Faversham off the Swale estuary. She does passenger charters along the Thames Estuary and the London River from Aldeburgh in Suffolk to Whitstable on the North Kent Coast. She sails from Maldon, Pin Mill, Chatham and London.

== See also ==
- List of active Thames sailing barges
