= SB Mirosa =

Historical British sailing vessel

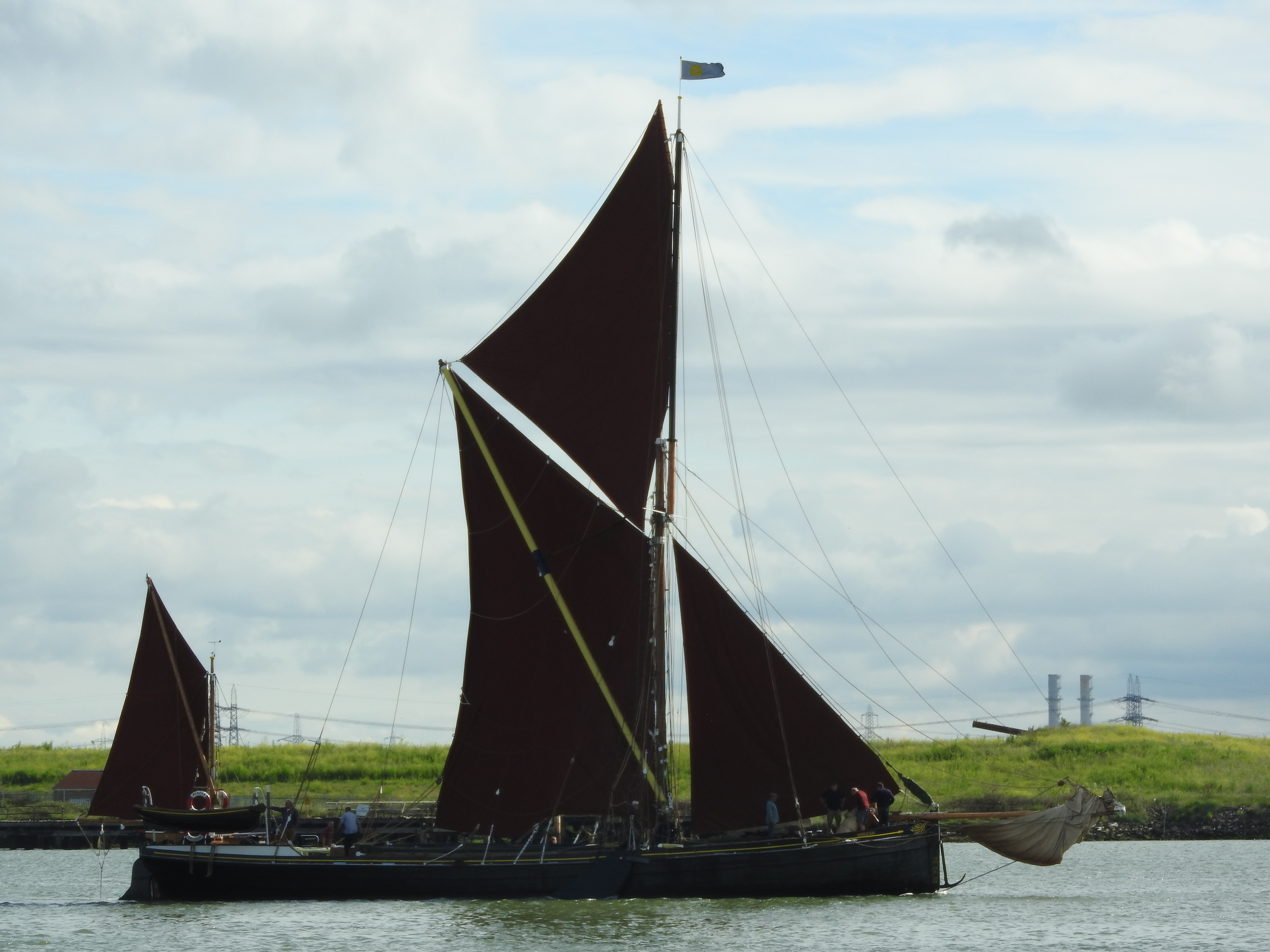
- Mirosa in 2017 Gillingham

History

United Kingdom
- Name: Ready (1892-1947); Mirosa (1947-to date)
- Owner: John Gutteridge, of Vauxhall, London; Francis & Gilders, Colchester
- Builder: John Howard, of Maldon
- Launched: 28 June 1892
- Identification: United Kingdom Official Number 096485
- Status: Based at Faversham

General characteristics
- Class & type: Thames barge
- Tonnage: 49 GRT
- Length: 82 feet 11 inches (25.27 m)
- Beam: 20 feet 9 inches (6.32 m)
- Draught: 3 feet 6 inches (1.07 m)
- Propulsion: Sails
- Sail plan: Spritsail
- Notes: Website=https://thamesbarge.org.uk/

Mirosa is a Thames barge which was built in 1892. From 1892 until 1947, she sailed under the name Ready when the name was sold to Trinity House for a lightship support vessel. Under her new name, she traded until 1955. Mirosa has never had an engine.

== Description ==
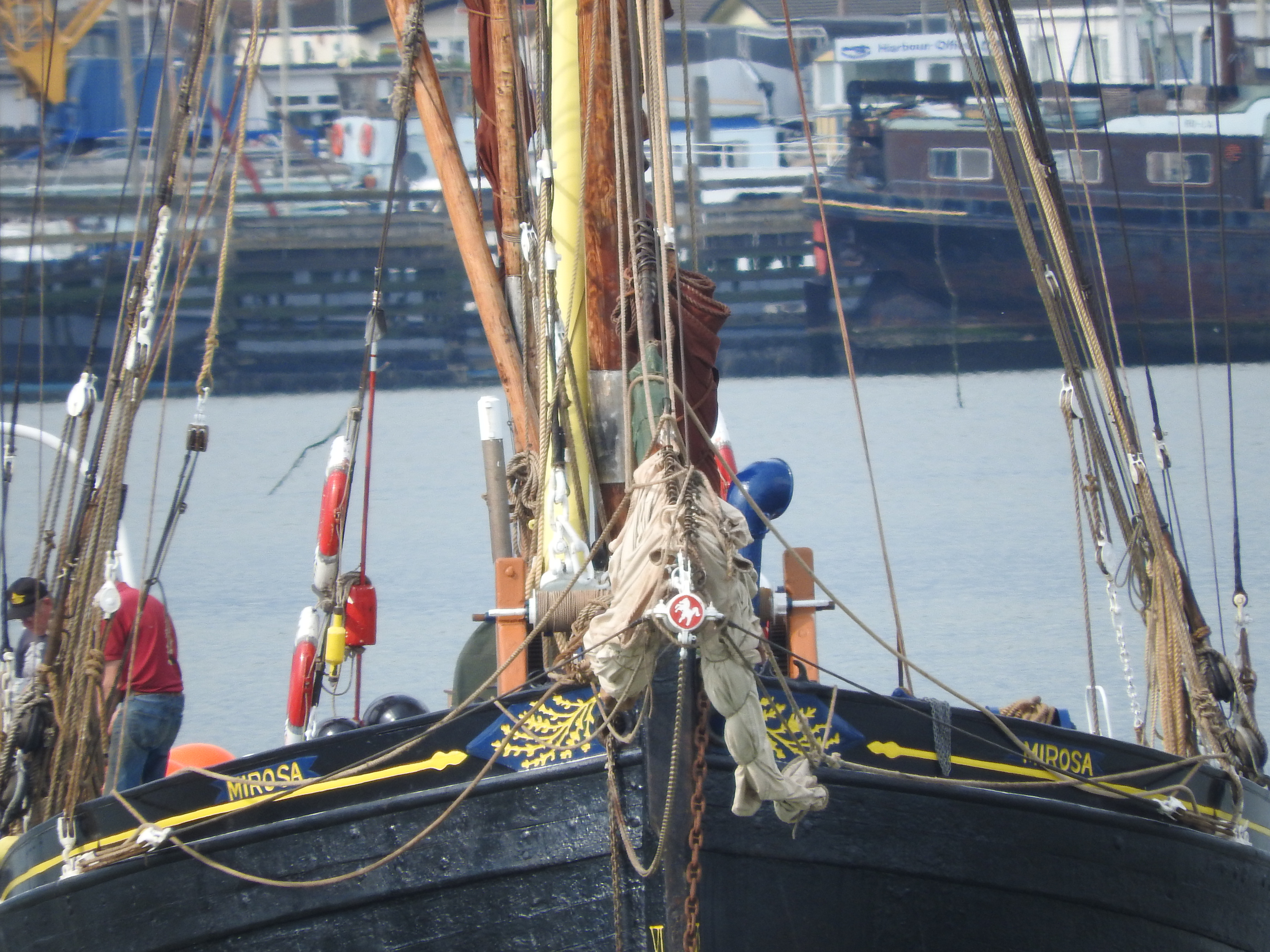
Mirosaś traditional rigging

Mirosa is one of the few remaining spritsail barges never to have had an engine fitted. Her owners claim she is now the most original of the active barges. She has a full set of flax sails, manilla running rigging, and a full set of sweeps (oars), and still has wooden masts. Mirosa is 82 feet (24.99 m) long, with a beam of 20 feet 9 inches (6.32 m) and a draught of 3 feet 6 inches (1.07 m). She was built with a bowsprit, this was removed but was reinstated in 1976. Her keel and chine planks are of elm, with pitch pine planks on the bottom and two-inch oak sides. This was later doubled over with pitch pine when was 30 or 40 years old. The shallow shape of her hull is typical of barges built by John Howard, of Maldon. She is assessed at 49 GRT.

== History ==
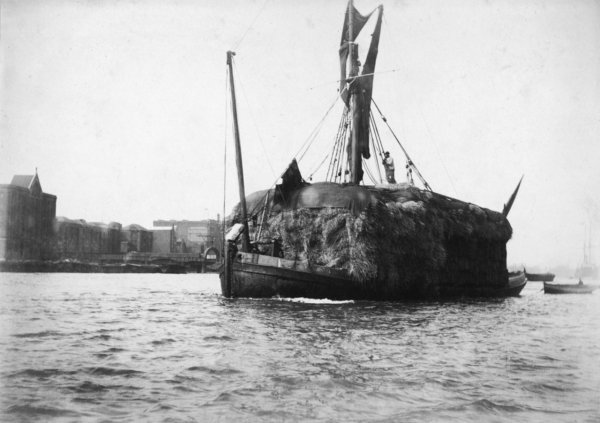
The hay barge Unity

She was built by of Maldon and launched on 28 June 1892 as the Ready for John Gutteridge, of Vauxhall, London. She was a stackie, barge that sailed carrying a large amount of hay and straw on its deck. These were needed to feed the city's horses. She travelled with her mainsail furled to a special series of reef points, from Essex and Suffolk to London, then returned with horse manure for the farms. The skipper steered by rudder from on top of the stack, while the mate kept watch from deck level. This trade declined and ceased with the use of motor vehicles after World War I in 1918.

She transferred cargo and went into timber, which like the hay was stacked metres high on the deck. She was bought by W W Keeble and then in the 1930s to Francis and Gilders, of Colchester, for whom she carried general cargoes, working out of Maldon and Colchester. She was skippered by 'Billy' Austin, then after the Second World War the Brightlingsea sailmaker Jim Lawrence was her skipper. In 1947 the owners sold her original name, Ready to Trinity House for use on a new lightship tender and she was renamed Mirosa. In 1954 was entered into and won the staysail class of the Thames and Medway barge matches. In 1955 she was sold to Brown and Son, of Chelmsford, and de-rigged for use as a timber lighter in the Heybridge Basin. The coasters importing timber anchored off Osea Island, being too large to enter the lock. When the lock was altered this trade disappeared.

In 1964 she was re-rigged- this time as a bowsprit barge to race, this was done by Dilberry Clark and Bill Percy. She was sold in 1967 to Alan Walker who used her as a live-in barge, but also raced with her, with Jimmy Diddams as skipper. In 1970 Carrie Spencer bought her and started racing her again in 1970. Peter Dodds, bought her in 1976 and based her at Iron Wharf, Faversham, where he lives aboard her. He refitted her extensively, and sails her to the Humber down to the Isle of Wight. She takes part in all of the barge matches.

== See also ==
- List of active Thames sailing barges
