= SB Lady of the Lea =

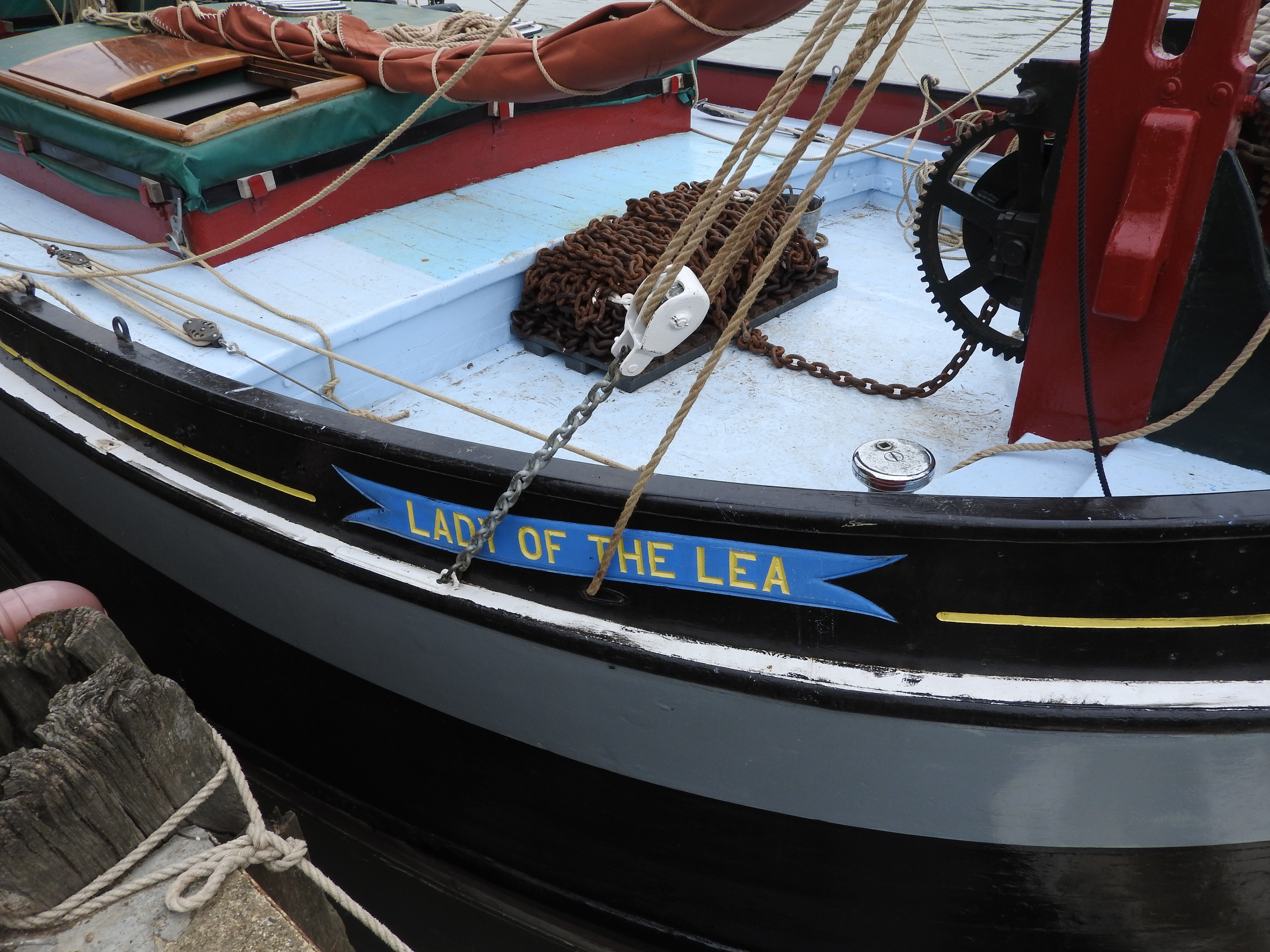
- Thames barge 'Lady of the Lea' moored at Faversham

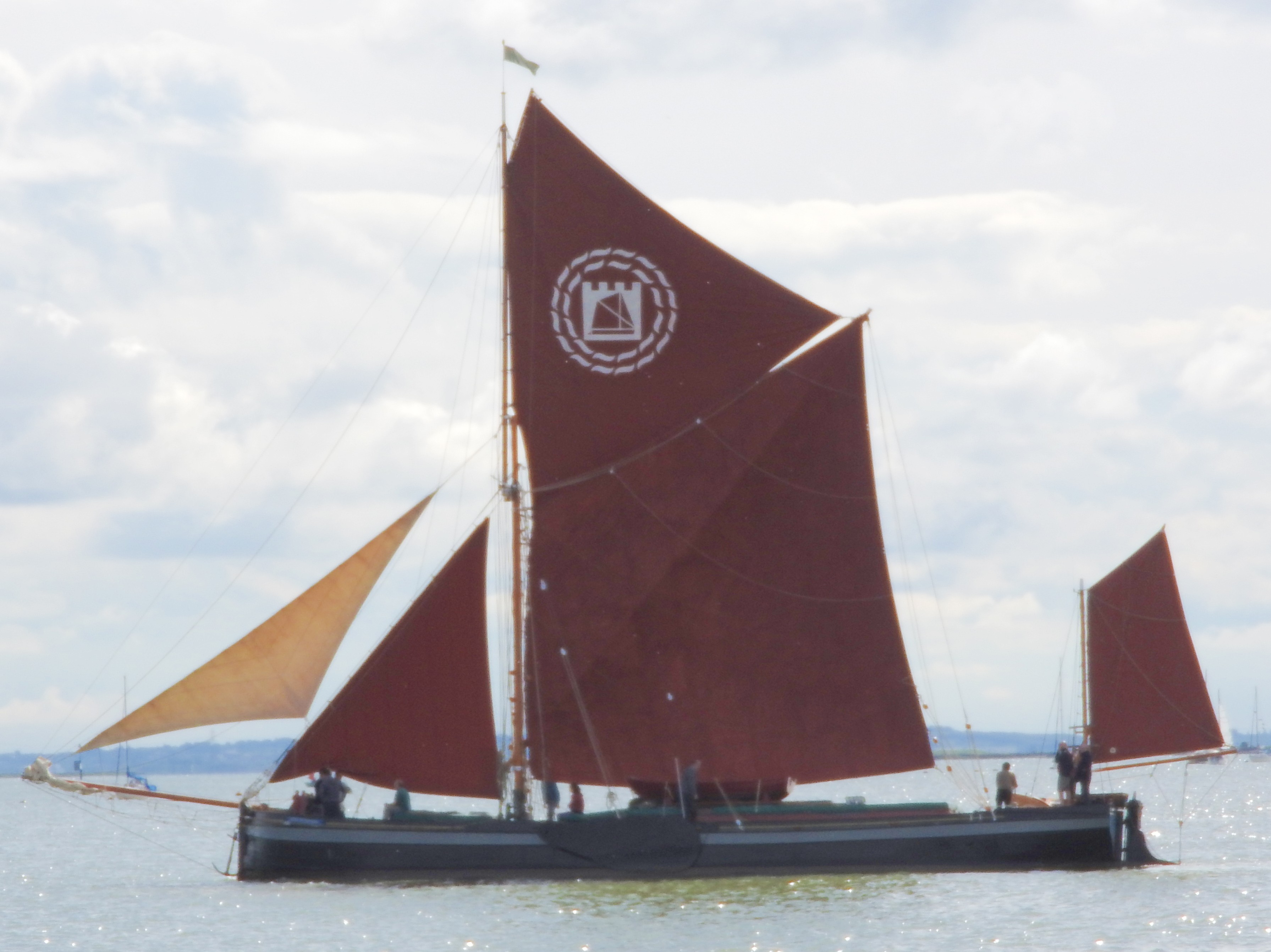
- Thames barge 'Lady of the Lea' under sail on the Medway

History

United Kingdom
- Name: Lady of the Lea
- Owner: 1931-1946 War Department 1946-c1953 W Aslett, Sittingbourne from c1953 Ivor R Cantle, Tring by 1980 Brian Pain, Faversham
- Builder: Hyam and Oliver (H. A. Oliver and Sons), Albion Wharf, Rotherhithe
- Commissioned: 1931
- Identification: British Official Number 722956
- Status: in service

General characteristics
- Tonnage: 34 GRT
- Length: 71.93 ft (21.92 m)
- Beam: 12.98 ft (3.96 m)
- Depth: 3.97 feet (1.21 metres)
- Propulsion: Sail and horse-drawn (engined since 1943)
- Sail plan: jib, foresail, topsail and mainsail on the mainmast, and a mizzen sail on mizzen mast

Lady of the Lea is a spritsail Thames sailing barge, the last such barge to be built in England. She was built in 1931 to carry explosives from Waltham Abbey Royal Gunpowder Mills on the River Lea to Woolwich Arsenal on the River Thames. The barge was later sold and rebuilt. She currently operates as a private yacht and competes in Thames sailing barge matches.

== Description ==
The barge Lady of the Lea was built of wood in Rotherhithe in 1931 by boat-builders Hyam & Oliver (who operated well into the 1960s) for the War Department, following the original plans of canal barges from a century earlier. She was built small enough to pass under the low bridges of the River Lea and Bow Creek in London and was originally tiller steered and stumpy rigged, without top mast or topsail. The bottom was built of pine (doubled up) and the sides of oak and elm with copper fastenings and brass knees. Unusually, the sails were white and not the normal russet colour (of other Thames barges). Her original tonnage and dimensions are not known.

After rebuilding in the 1980s she is now 71.9 ft (21.9 m) long, 13.0 ft (4.0 m) wide and 4.0 ft (1.2 m) deep and measures 34 GT. She now has a wheel and was in the staysail class of sailing barge. Her current sails are a jib, foresail, mainsail and topsail on the mainmast, and a mizzen sail on the mizzen-mast aft. Initially engined in 1943, she has been powered since 1980 by a Ford diesel. more recently the barge has been fitted with a bowsprit.

== War Department service ==
Lady of the Lea was completed by Hyam & Oliver in 1931 by four men taking six months at a cost of £1,500. Along with her earlier sister King Edward VII, she replaced older barges engaged in the carriage of explosives from the Waltham Abbey Royal Gunpowder Mills to Woolwich Arsenal. Lady of the Lea could carry up to 500 barrels of explosives in the main hold, principally cordite and RDX. The barge travelled from Waltham Abbey, down the River Lea, to Bow Creek and then via the River Thames to the Royal Arsenal. As that involved both canal, narrow river and open river navigation, the barges were equipped for both horse towing and sail operation. The Waltham Abbey vessels had a crew consisting of a master and three men, who wore blue serge uniforms with brass buttons, provided free of charge. A model display can be seen at the Royal Gunpowder Mills at Waltham Abbey showing Lady of the Lea at work on the canals, and a model of the barge is in the London Canal Museum.

All the Waltham Abbey barges were of wood and without mechanical propulsion, to reduce risk of explosion. In 1943 all the production of cordite and RDX was transferred away from Royal Gunpowder Factory, and Lady of the Lea was fitted with a petrol engine by the Royal Navy. After the end of World War II she was withdrawn from service and sold in 1946 by the Small Craft Disposal Board.

== Civilian life ==
In 1946, Lady of the Lea was sold to William Aslett and moored in the Milton Creek at Crown Quay in Sittingbourne. In the early 1950s she was sold to Ivor Cantle, moved to Cow Roast, near Tring and converted to a houseboat.

The barge was subsequently sold to Brian Pain and largely rebuilt between 1980 and 1990, including doubling the bottom and lower hull, re-rigging as a Thames sailing barge and fitting a new Ford diesel engine. She is used as a private yacht and for charters, carries the logo of Rochester Independent College, founded as Rochester Tutors by Brian Pain, on her topsail. Lady of the Lea is now based at Standard Quay in Faversham and races regularly in the Thames barge races.

In 2009 she featured in Episode 4 of the BBC One series "Rivers", in which Griff Rhys Jones retold the history of the powder barges of the River Lea.

== Thames barge races ==
Since 2003 Lady of the Lea has competed in Thames barge races. Her best overall positions in the annual championship matches have been:

- 2009 1st place
- 2012 2nd behind Edith May
- 2013 equal 3rd
- 2015 equal 2nd in the Coasting Class
