= Edith May (barge) =

Historic British sailing vessel

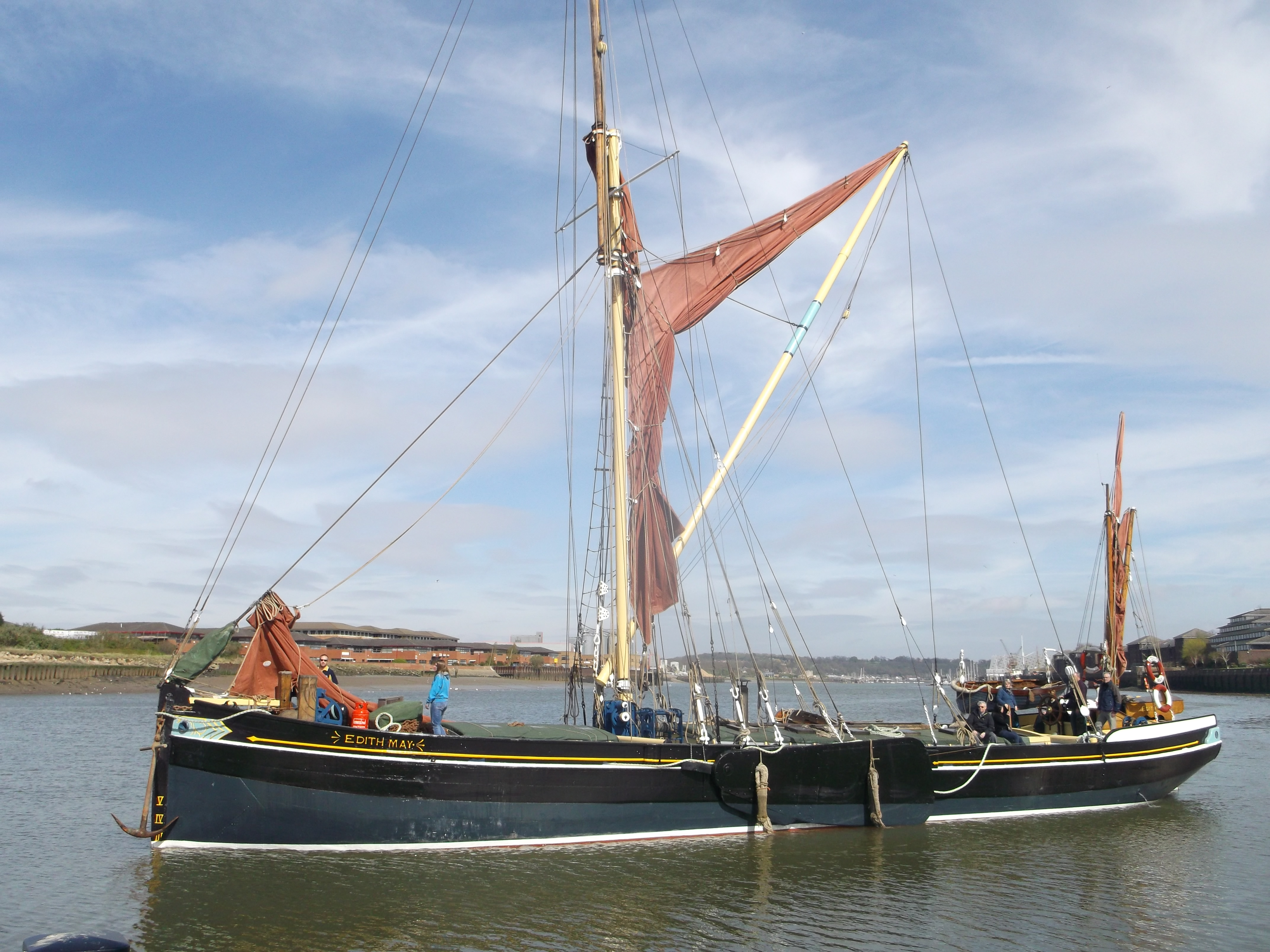
- Edith May on the River Medway near Chatham

History

United Kingdom
- Name: Edith May
- Owner: William Barrett
- Operator: William Barrett
- Builder: John and Herbert Cann (Harwich)
- Commissioned: 1906
- Decommissioned: 1952
- Status: Private use and private charter ship

General characteristics
- Tonnage: 125
- Length: 86 ft (26 m)
- Beam: 20.75 ft (6.32 m)
- Height: 0 ft (0 m) to top of mainmast
- Draught: 4 ft (1.2 m) distance between the waterline and the bottom of the hull (keel)
- Propulsion: Sail and diesel engine
- Speed: 0 knots (0 km/h) maximum speed
- Range: 0 nautical miles (0 km)
- Notes: Built of constructed of Pitch Pine on Oak; Website:http://edithmaybargecharter.co.uk/

Edith May is a wooden Thames sailing barge built in Harwich, Essex, in 1906. She was used to carry various cargoes (mainly grain) until 1952, when a diesel engine was fitted, after which she was used in various Thames Sailing Barge matches, winning several. She was a museum ship for a time, and was restored in 2010 to offer charter trips on the River Medway. Her winter moorings are at Lower Halstow, where she opens during the weekend as a tearoom.

== History ==
The Thames sailing barge Edith May was built for her original owners, William Barrett of 153 Mornington Road, Leytonstone, Essex and her first skipper was Captain Howard. She was then sold to Alfred Sully (also known as G.F. Sully based in London), who managed the barge from just after the First World War. They owned many Thames sailing barges at that time, with Edith May the smallest barge. The barge continued in the ownership of Sully's throughout her working life, carrying cereal products, wheat, barley etc. between East Anglia and London. Her largest cargo was 133 tons of wheat (from Manitoba, Canada), but more typically she would carry around 120 tons.

In 1952 an auxiliary engine was fitted (a Ford diesel engine of 120 hp).

In 1953, she won the Thames Barge Sailing match under the skippership of Chubb Horlock. It was believed to be the Coronation Match of that year.

In September 1957, she was converted into a motor barge at Colchester.

Then Vernon Harvey bought the barge from trade and she was re-rigged with the gear from the famous racing barge, Veronica when her career ended in 1963. Regarded as a latter day racing Queen, the Edith May dominated the Sailing Barge Matches of the 1960s, 1970s and early 1980s and to this day her reputation is still revered amongst bargemen.

After 1961, she was re-rigged by Jack Spitty (an Essex-born barge skipper) for the owner.

In January 1961, she operated as a motor barge, skippered by Bob Childs, a local bargeman. Bob in his retirement, wrote the book Rochester Barges.

In 1971, Jack Spitty (aged 79) also won the Blackwater Sailing barge race.

She was sold and moved to Liverpool during the 1980s (to become a museum ship) before returning to Maldon in 1987.Sea Breezes Publications August 2011. To operate as a charter barge.

She sat in St Katharine Docks, London (while owned by Roger Angus), for several years and was not maintained very well. Then on 7 October 1999 she was bought by Geoff Gransden who moved her to Lower Halstow on the River Medway.

== Current usage ==
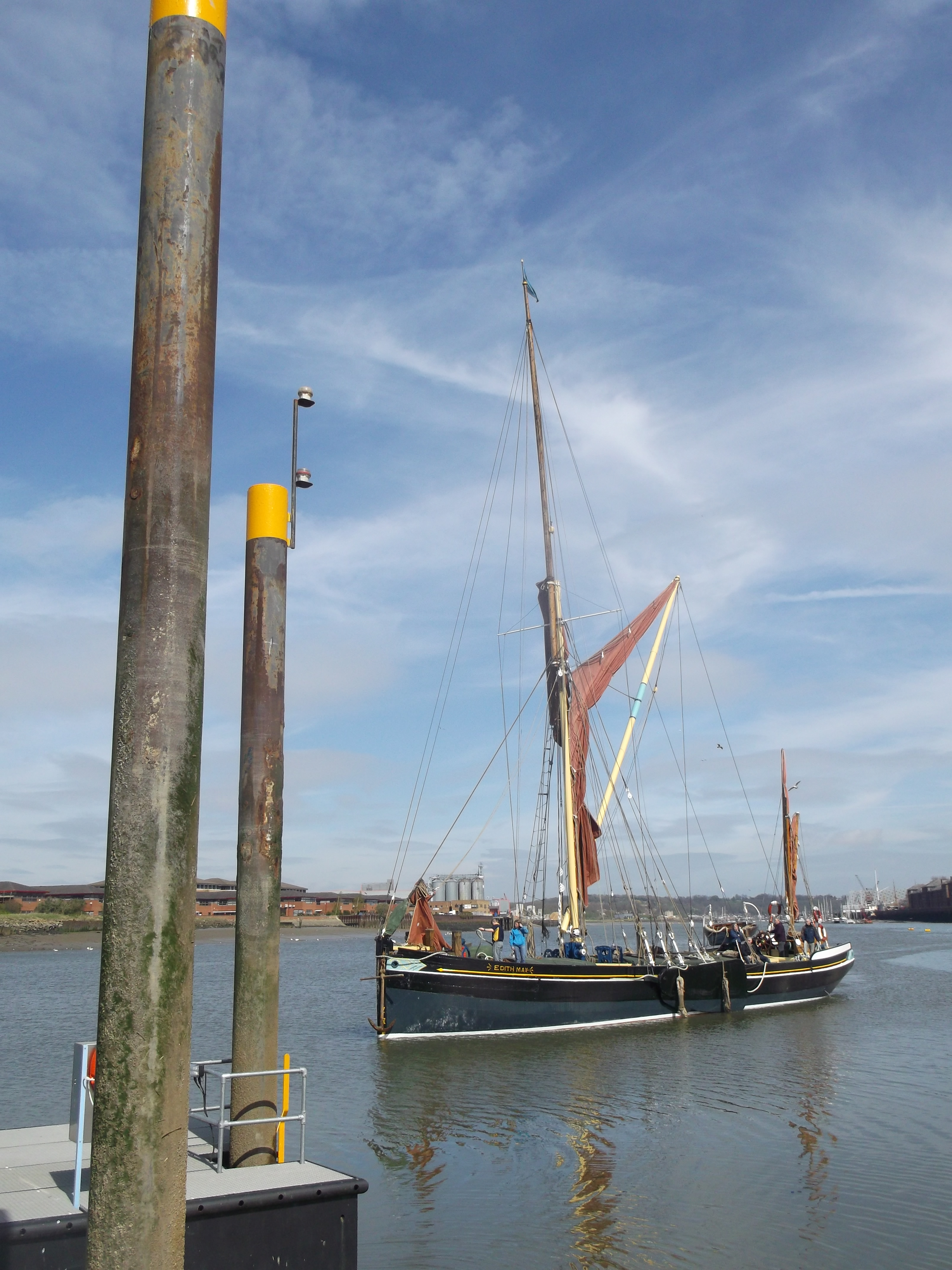
Edith May coming toward Sun Pier Chatham

In September 2009, a sail maker began measuring up for new sails.

On 21 November 2009, she was open to the public for an exhibition of local artists (from the Medway area). She then opened to the public every weekend after that date.

In January 2010, she was award a sustainability grant of £1500 for her sails, which was made from the Strategic Development Fund of National Historic Ships.

She held a launch party on Saturday 10 July 2010.

In 2010, she attended the Rochester Sweeps and Charles Dickens Festivals.

In 2011 she was featured in Yachting Monthly, under the title 'An Essex girl back in the groove'.

In April 2012, she became the Flagship of the Year 2012 and awarded £1,000 from the Strategic Development Fund of National Historic Ships UK.

Martyn Heighton,(Director, National Historic Ships UK) was quoted

II am delighted that in the year of the Diamond Jubilee Pageant the status of Flagship has been awarded to a vessel specifically designed to trade on the river Thames.

In September 2012, the 82nd Thames Sailing Barge Match took place. Cambria won and Edith May came fifth behind Thalatta, Lady of the Lea and Pudge.

The Edith May team were delighted to receive the Flagship award from National Historic Ships at their presentation ceremony aboard HMS Belfast on Wednesday 24 October 2012. The Princess Royal handed out the certificate, complimenting the barge on a very busy season.

In 2013 another Thames Barge Match took place. Edith May battled among nine other barges in various classes, coming second in the Champion staysail class.

She sails from Rochester, Chatham, Queenborough and Lower Halstow (which is also her Winter mooring point). Since 2007, the Edith May has hosted a popular weekend tea-room.

== Media ==
In 1966, Jack Spitty became the Skipper in several matches. Anglia Television produced a programme about Jack Spitty and his barge Edith May as part of the Bygones series.

In April 2012, Edith May was selected for Avenue of Sail in the Queen's Diamond Jubilee Pageant on 3 June 2012. According to Guinness World Records, this was the largest ever parade of boats, surpassing the previous record of 327 vessels.

In 2016, Lower Halstow creek and the Barge is featured in the Wonder Woman film, pretending to be a location in Belgium.

== Gallery ==
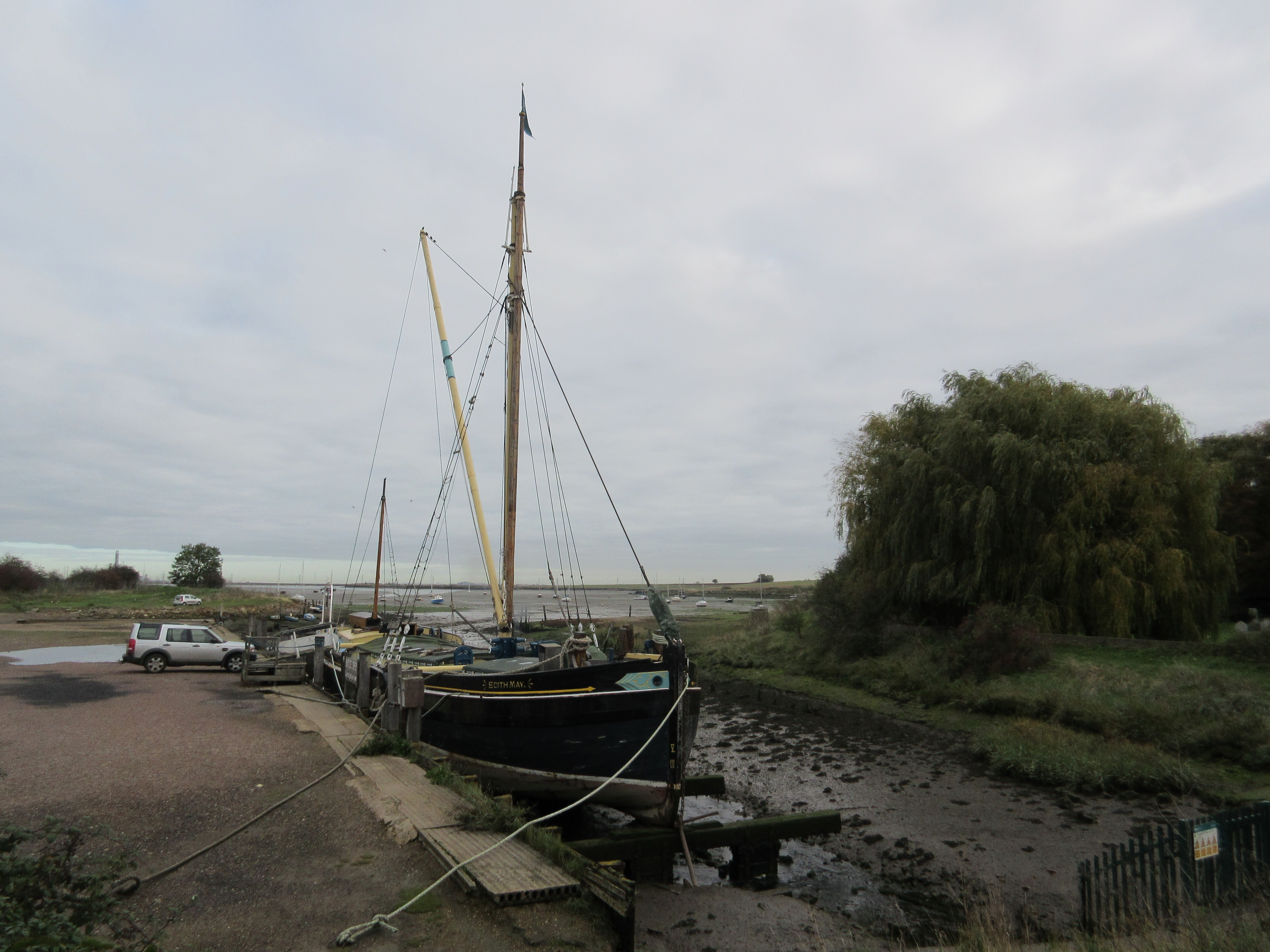
Edith May sailing Barge moored at Lower Halstow, for the winter period.

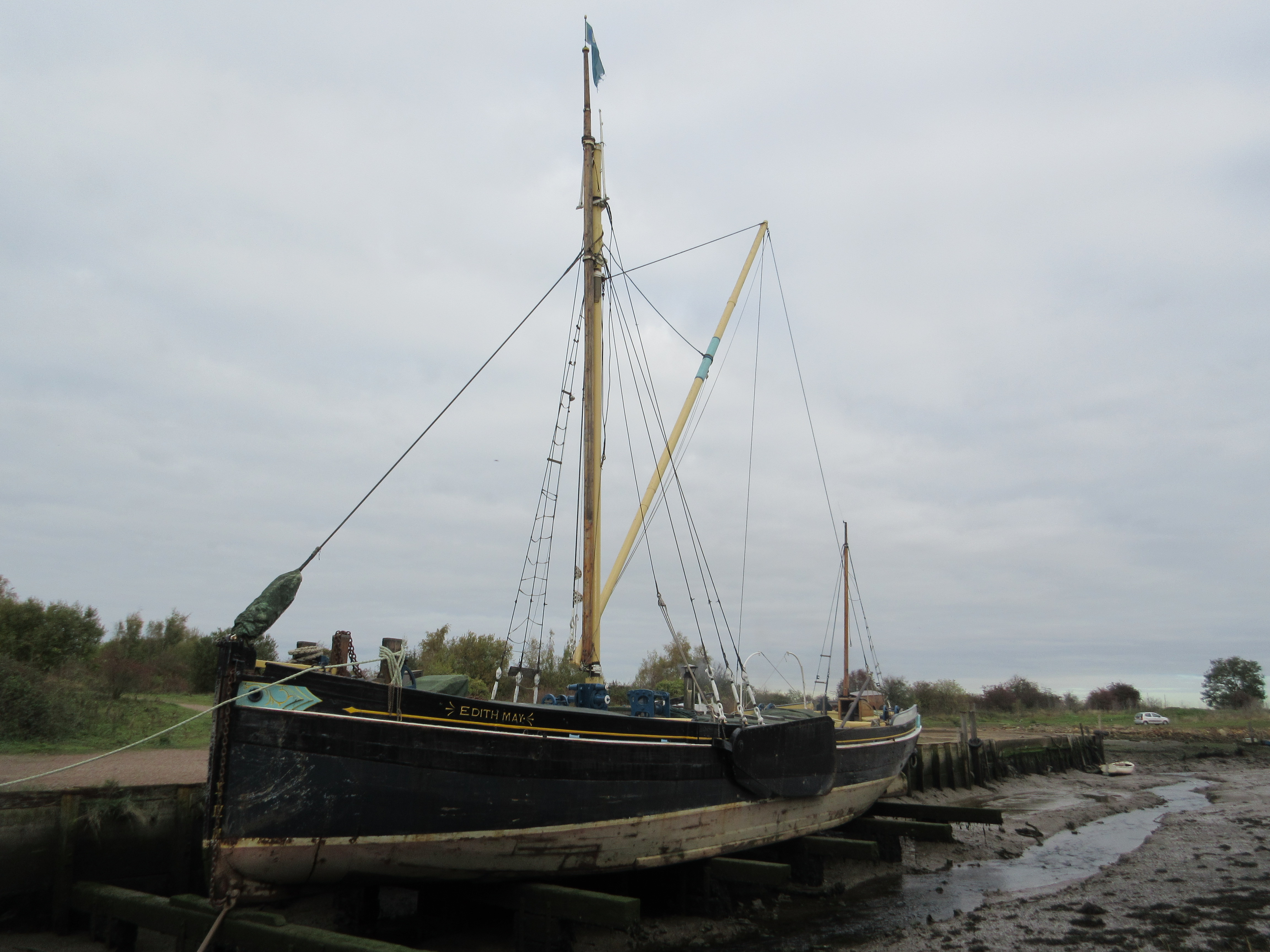
Edith May sailing Barge at Lower Halstow at low tide.

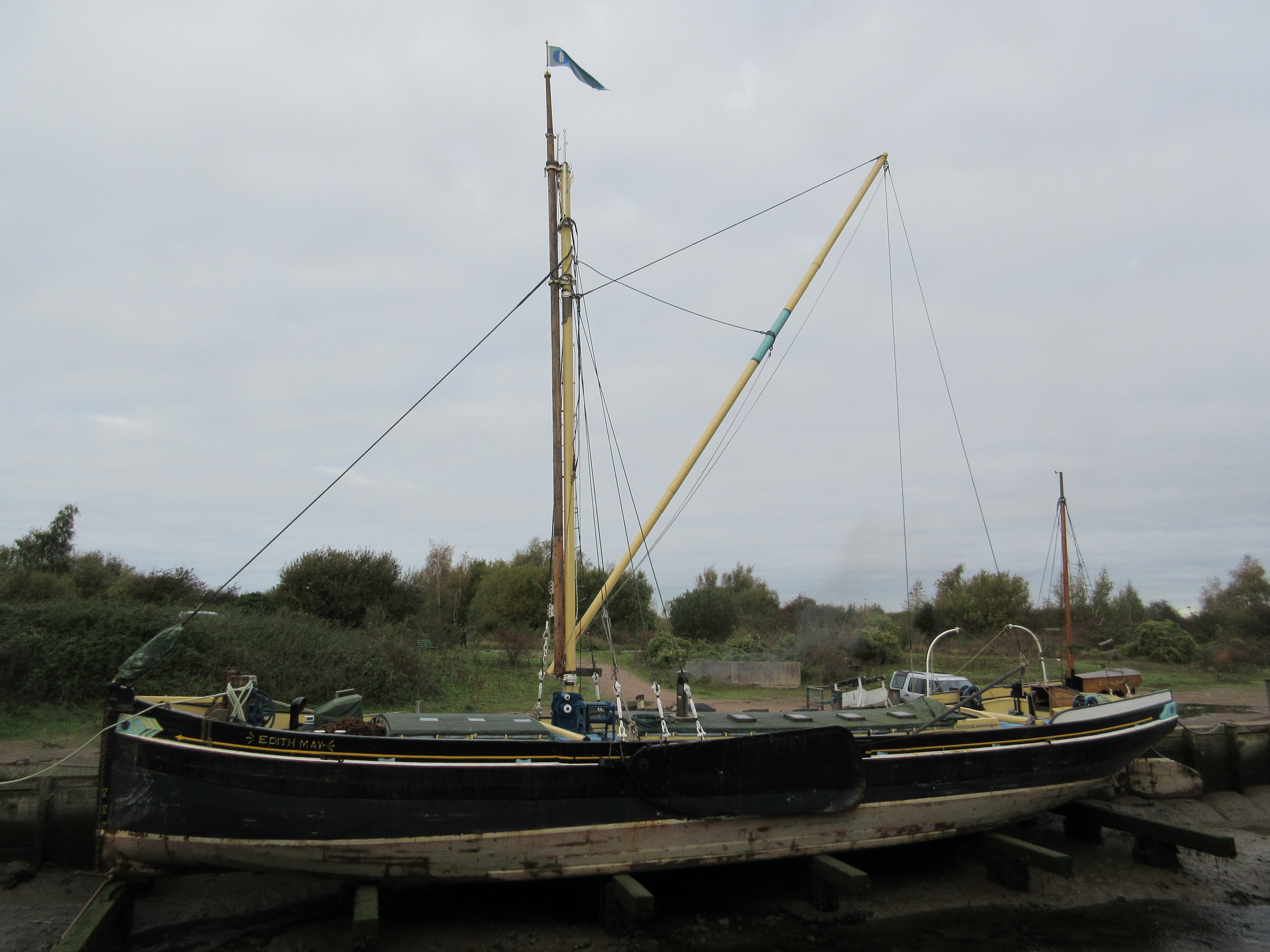
Edith May sailing Barge at Lower Halstow at low tide.

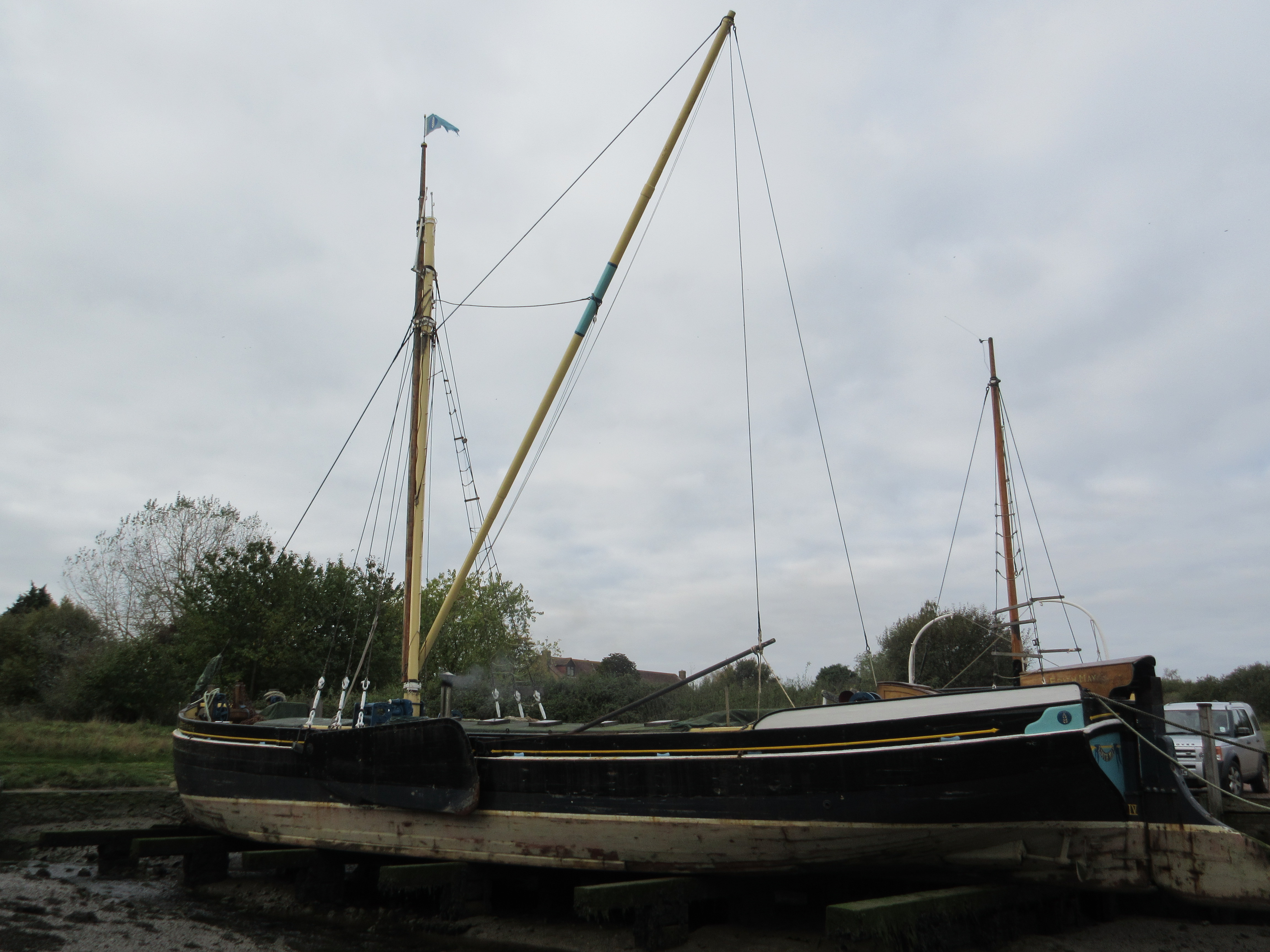
Edith May sailing Barge at Lower Halstow at low tide.

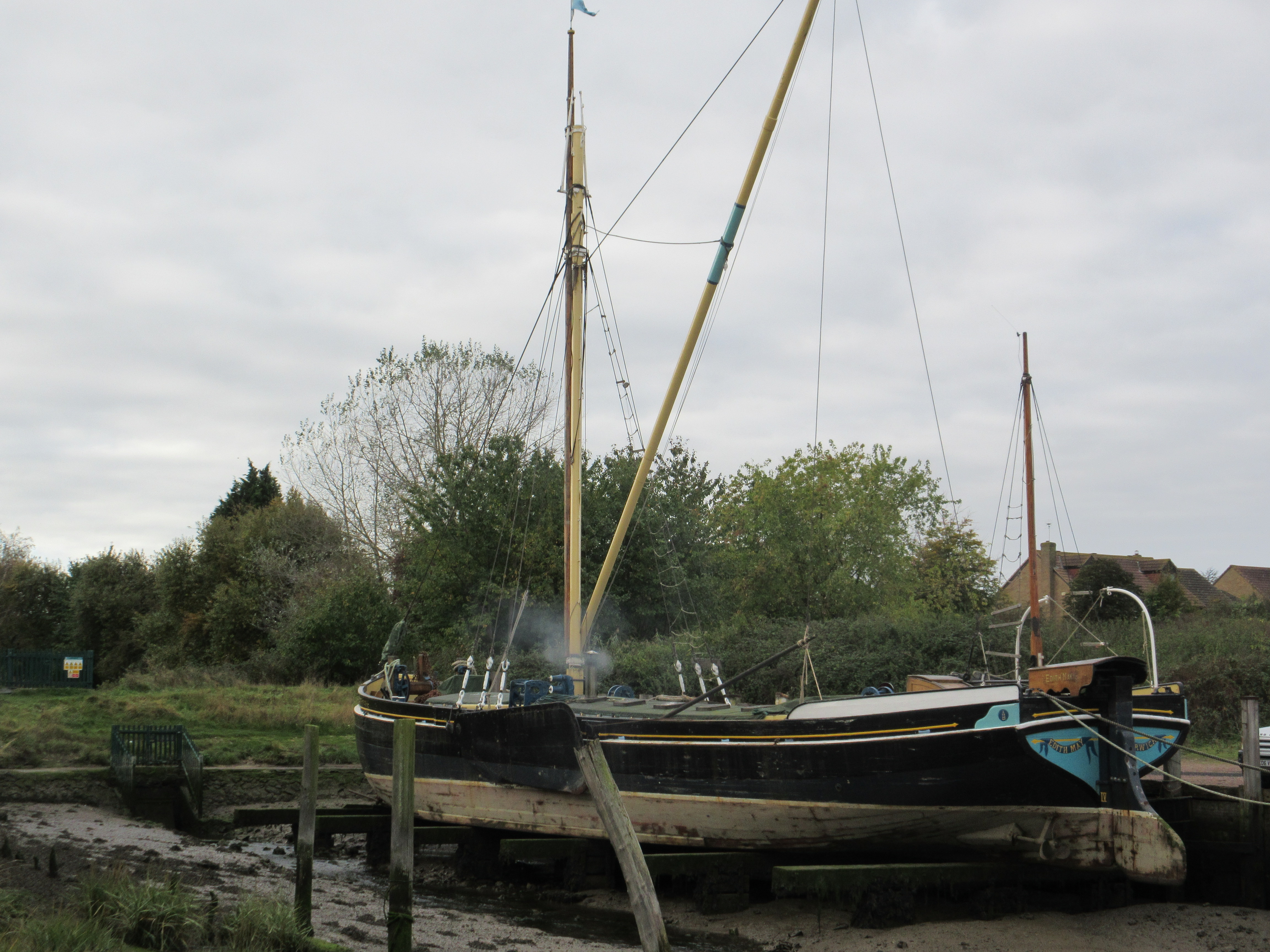
Edith May sailing Barge at Lower Halstow at low tide.

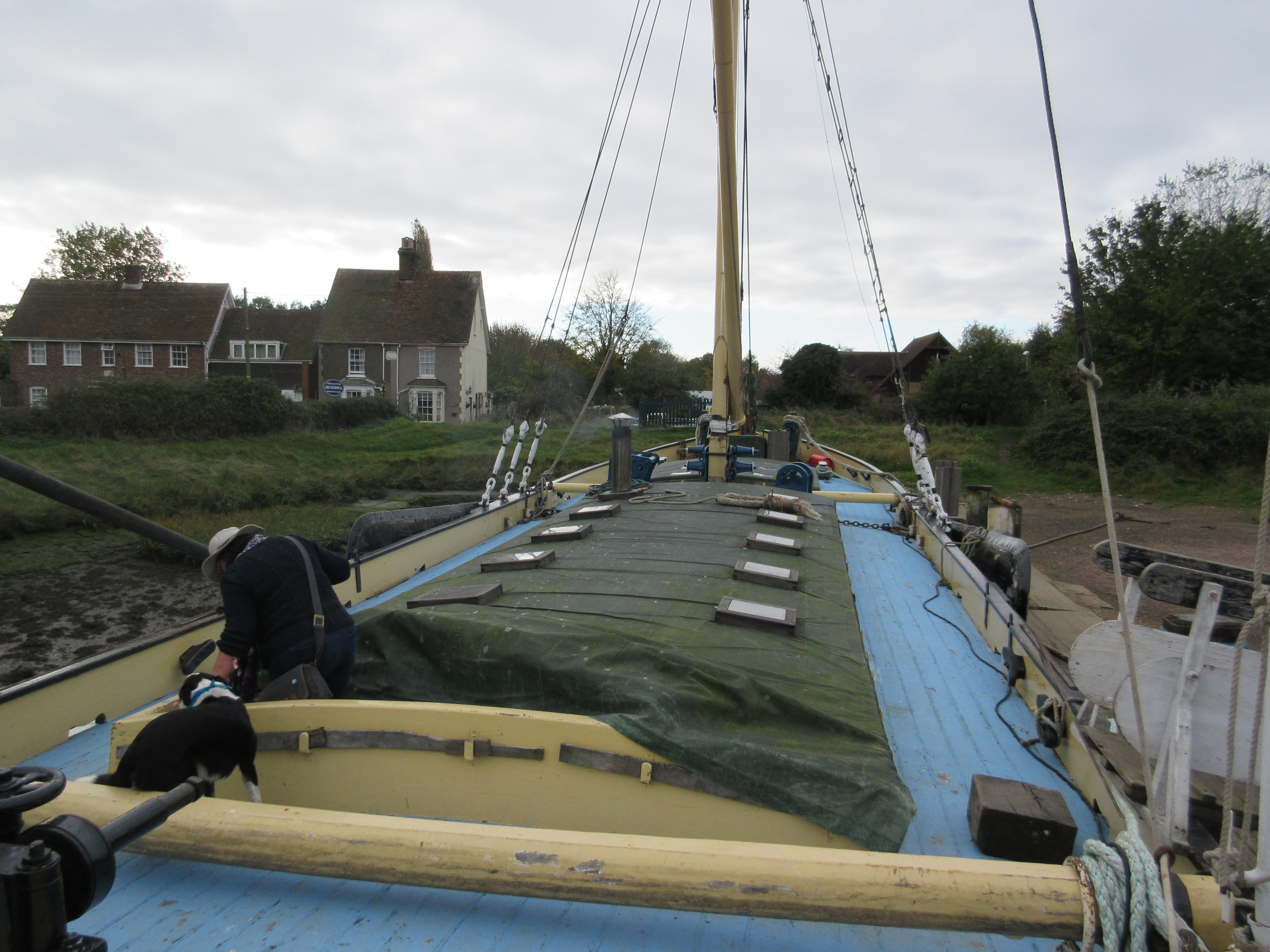
Deck of the Sailing Barge, with Lower Halstow Church in the background.

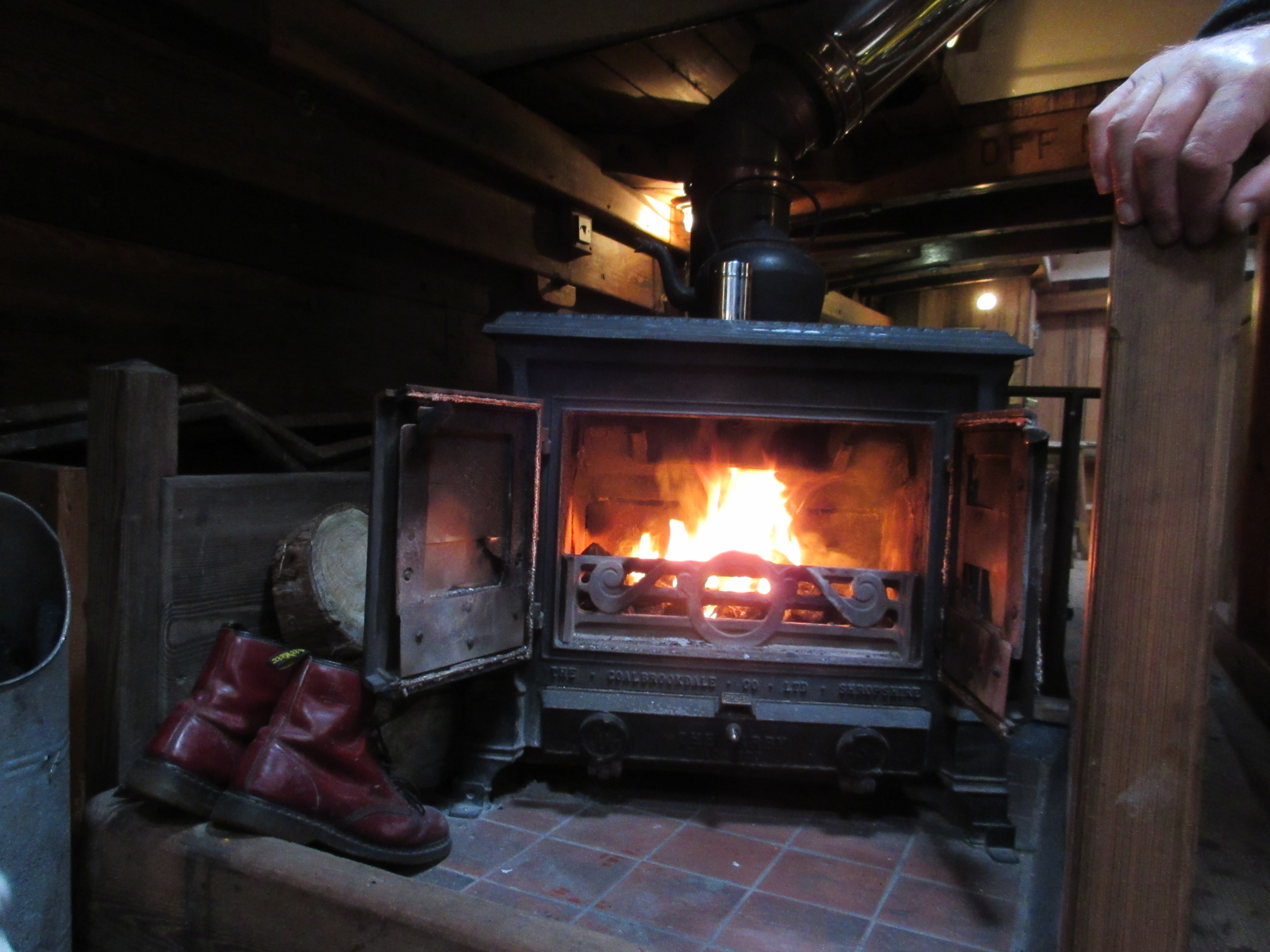
This coal burning stove heats the barge and water.

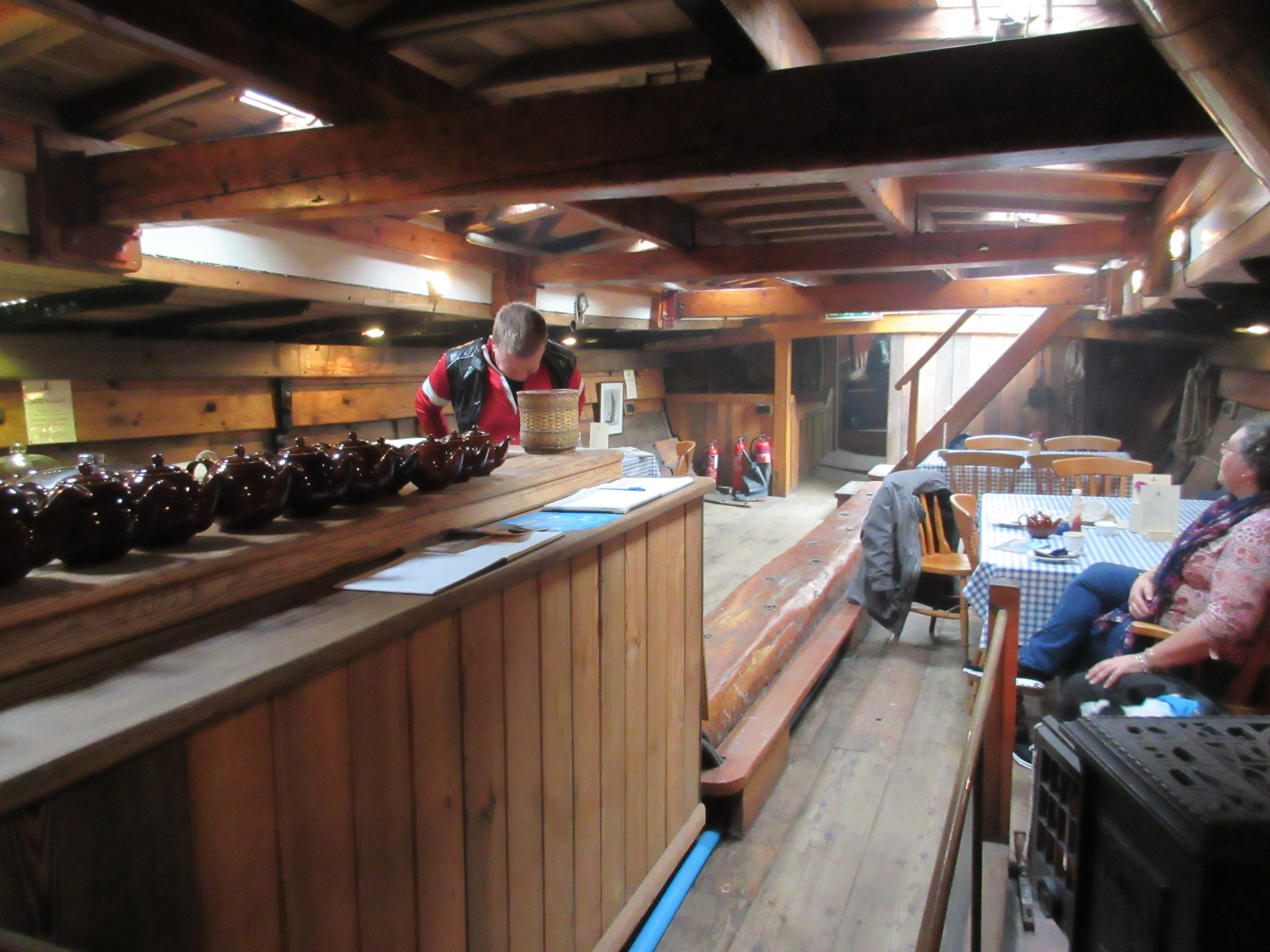
During the winter period, the barge is opened up on the weekends, for people to have tea and coffee on board.

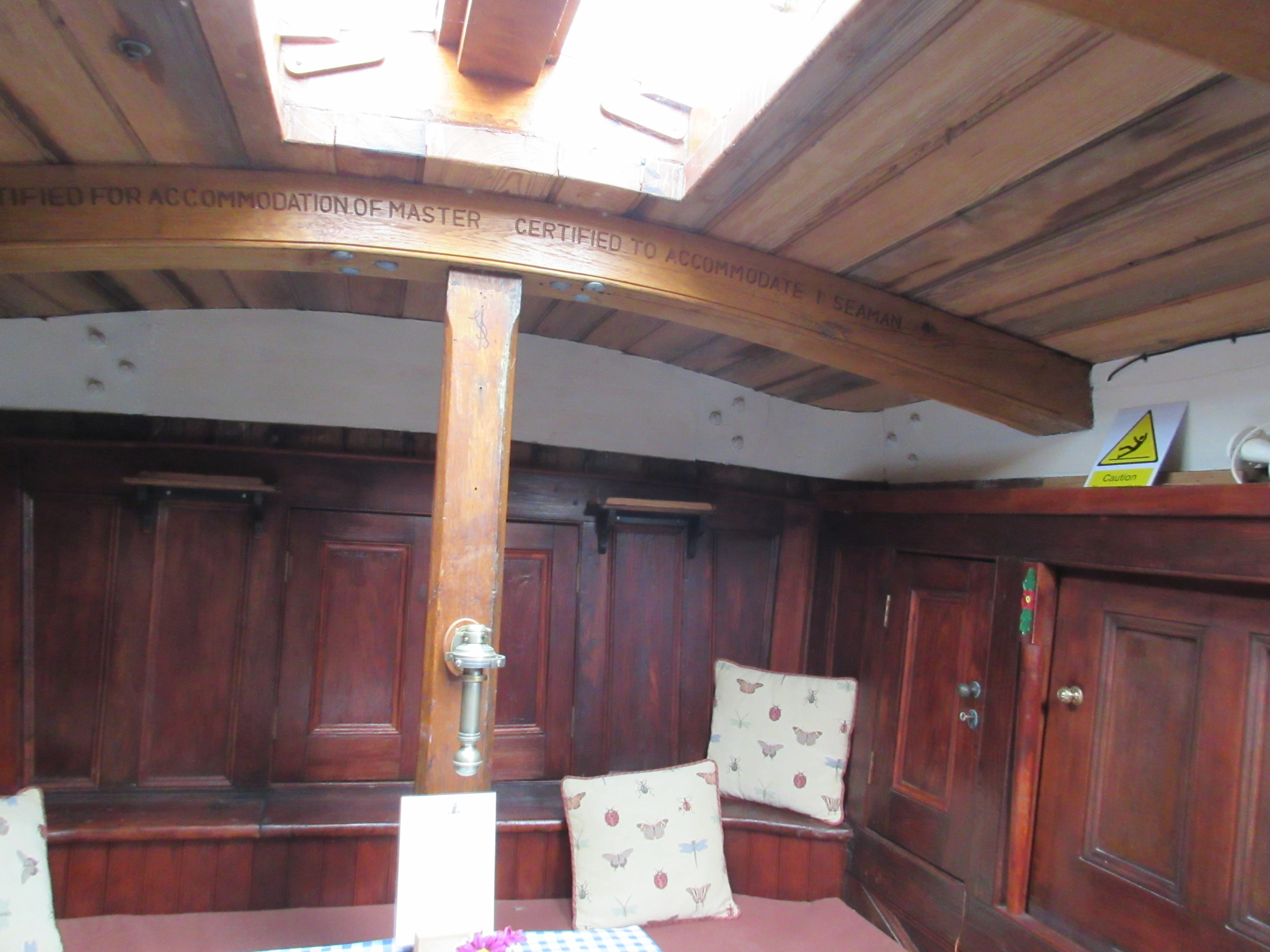
The front cabin with timber paneling.

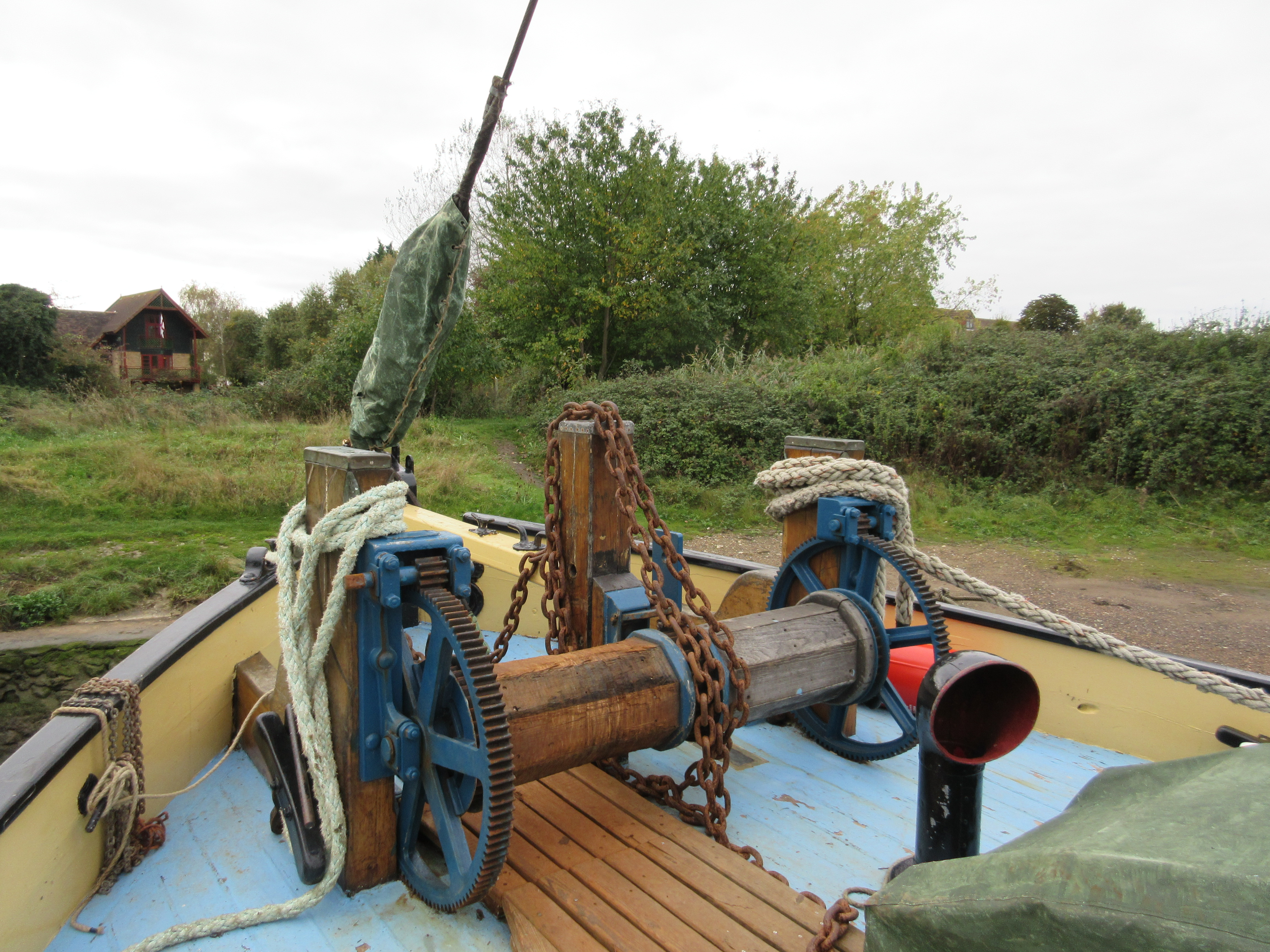
The anchor chain winch.

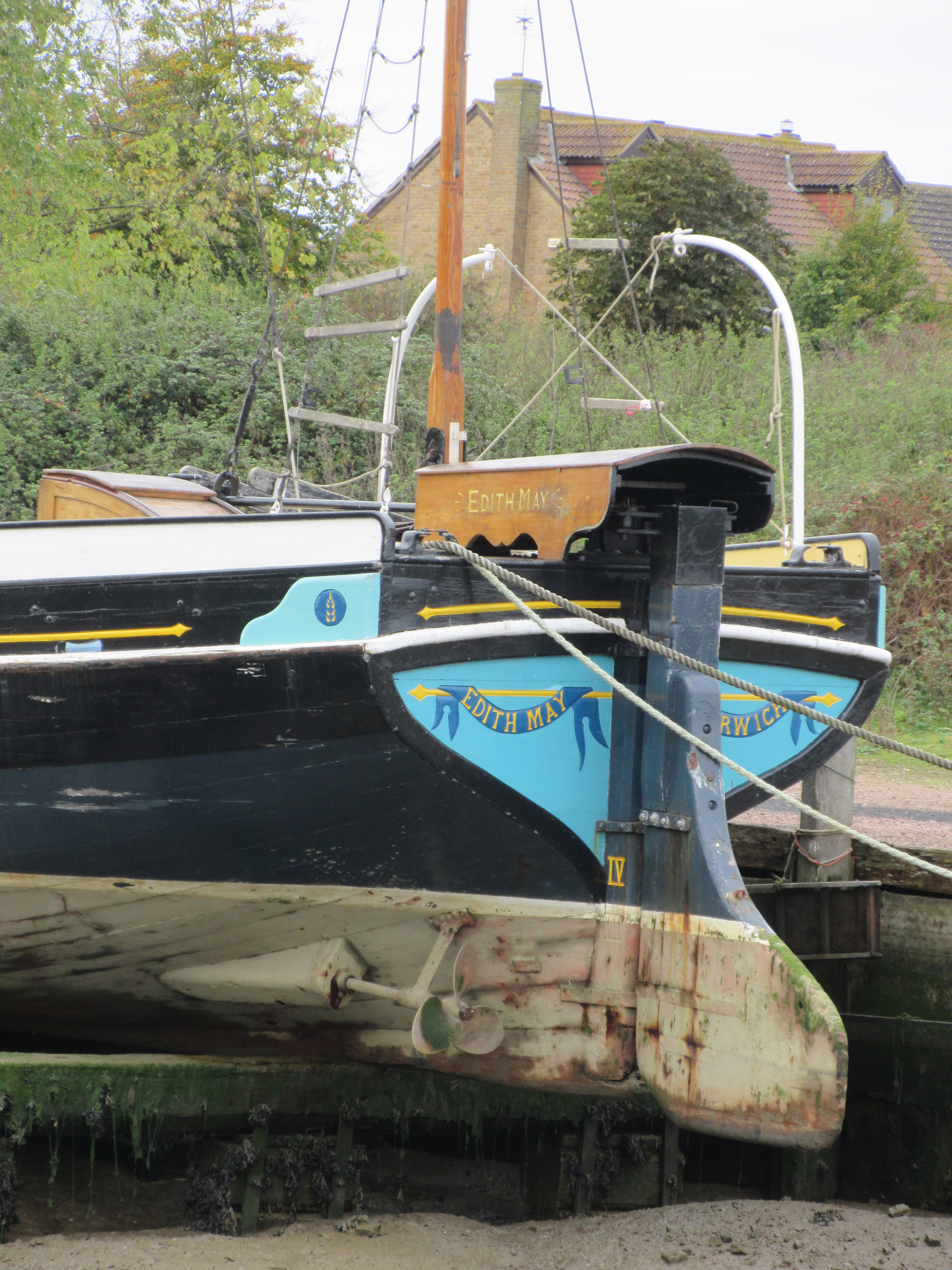
The rear (or stern of the barge).

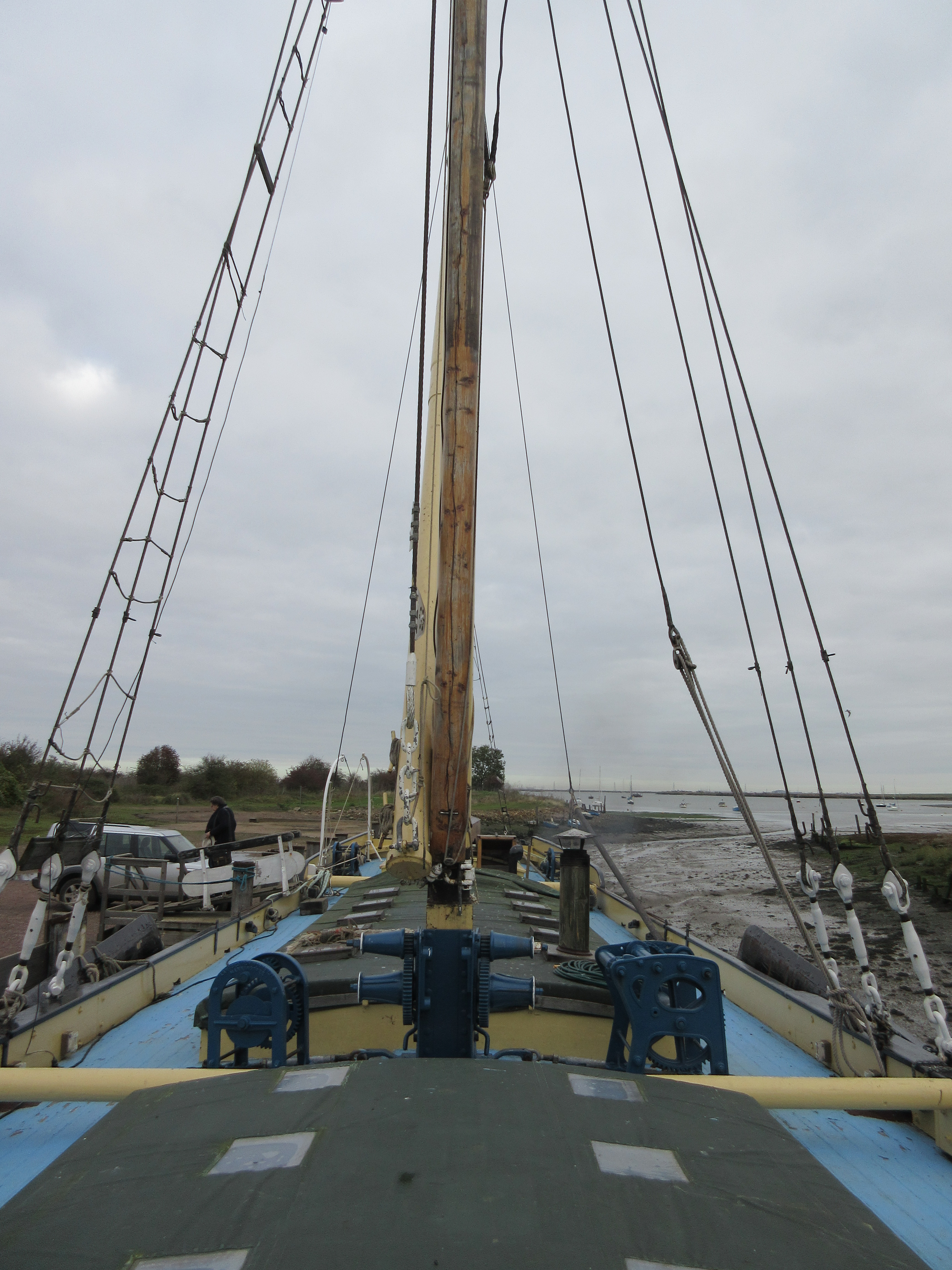
The deck of the barge looking out towards the River Medway.

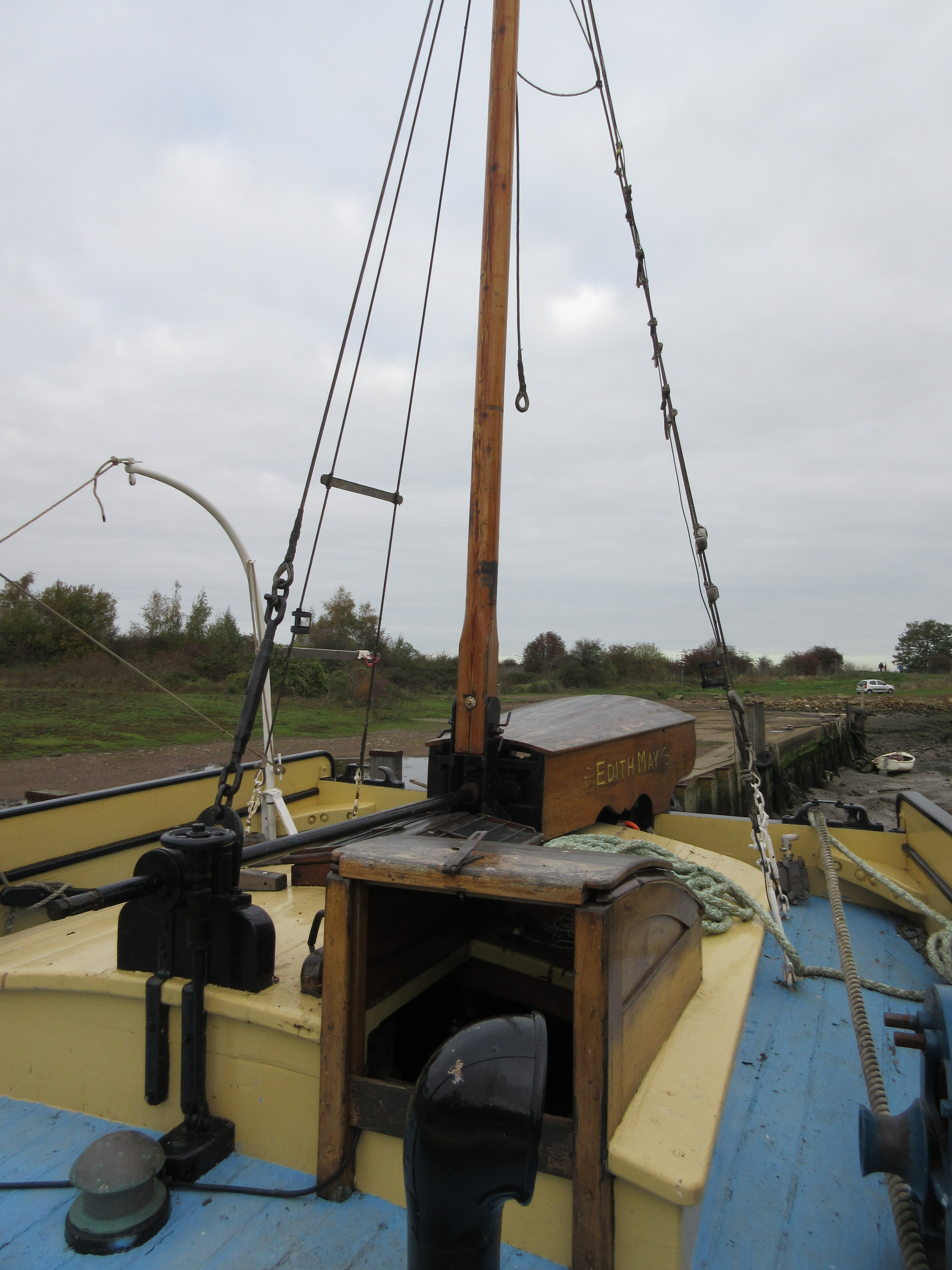
Barge deck.

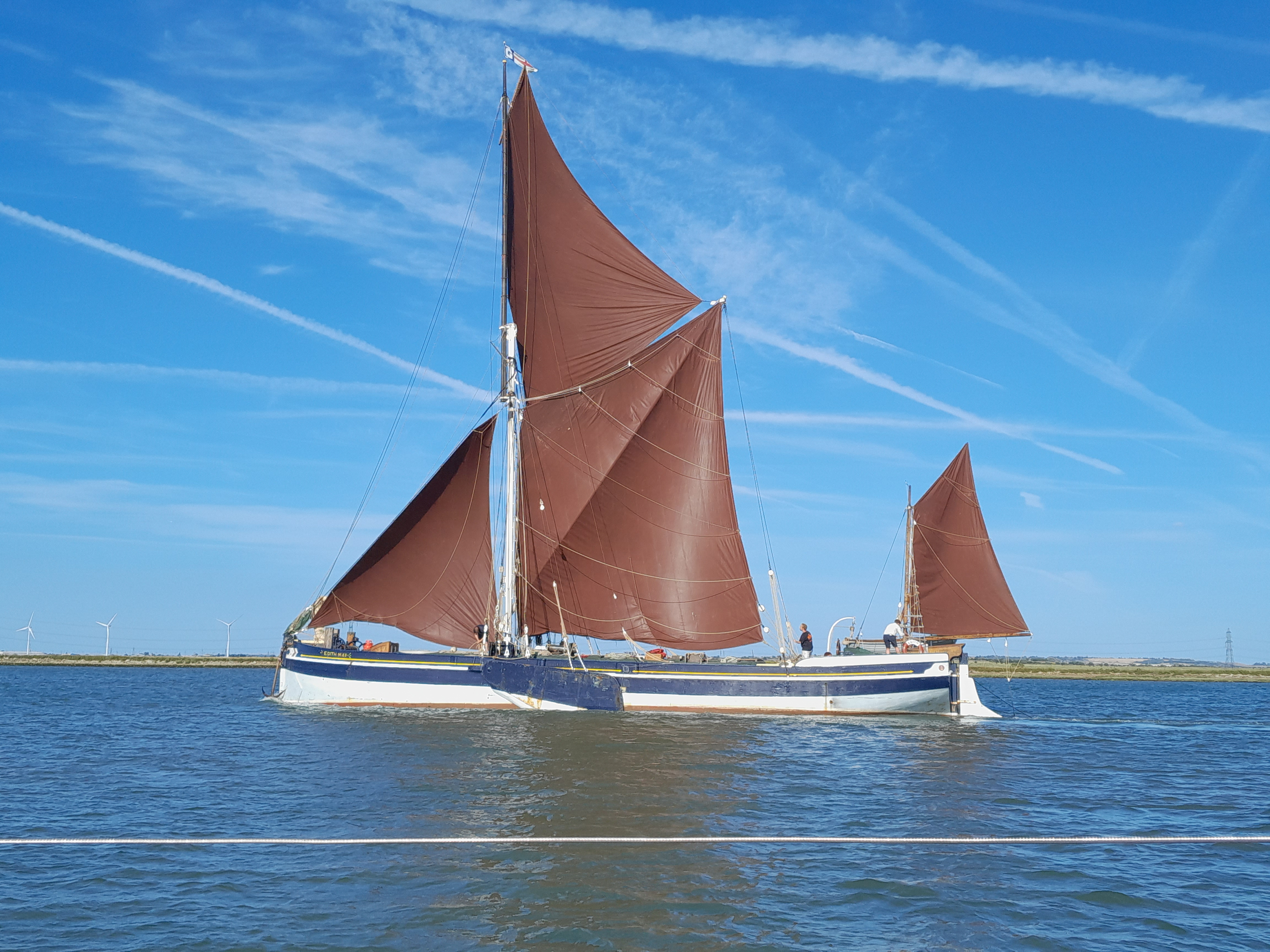
Under Sail
