= SB Decima =

Thames sailing barge

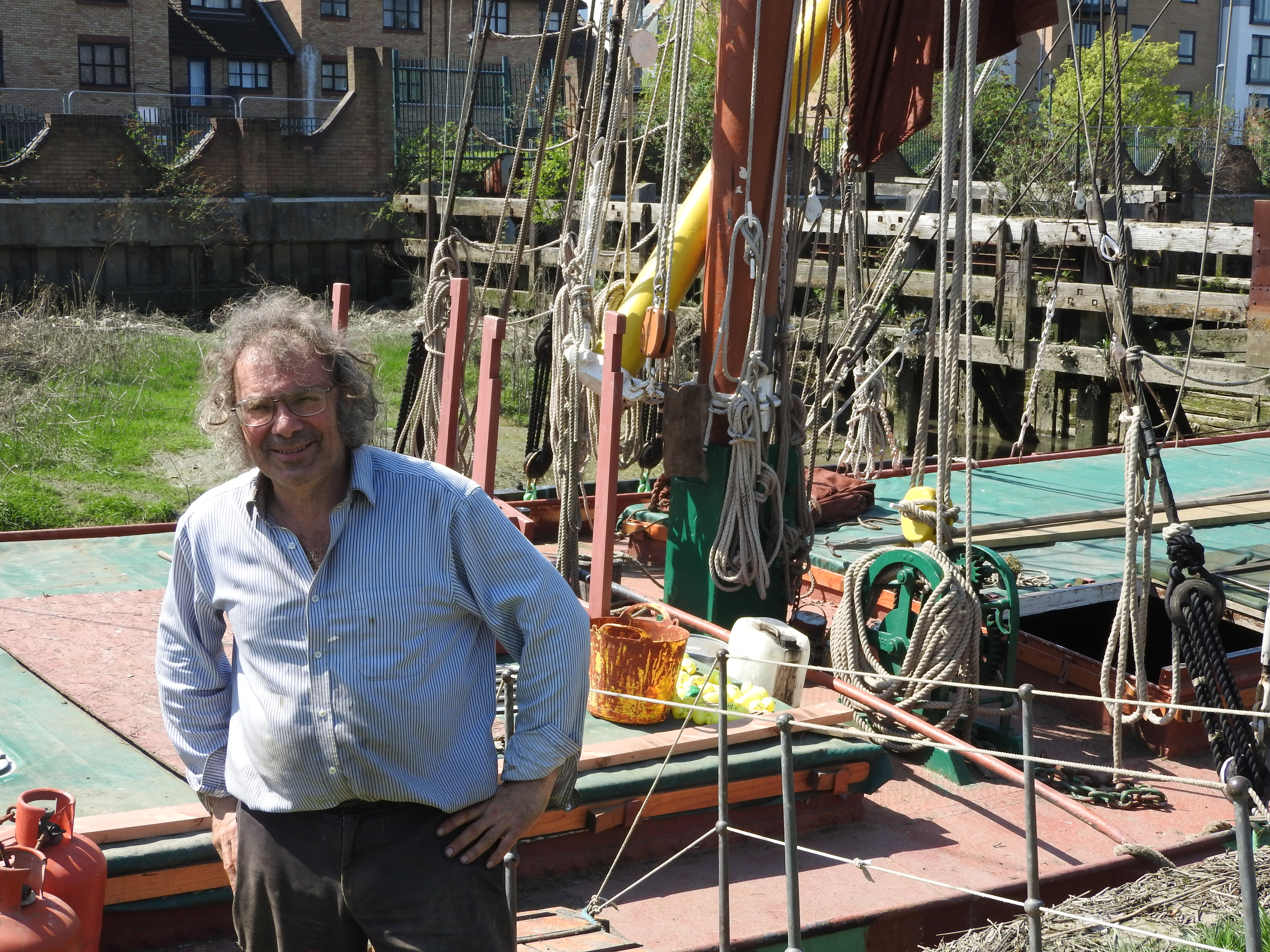
- David Leal and the SB Decima at Dartford Lock 2018

History

United Kingdom
- Name: Decima
- Owner: E. J. Goldsmith of Grays (1899-1949); Rayfield's of Gravesend (1949-1960s); Greenhithe Lighterage Co, (Tester Bros) motor barge (1960s-1977); Berty (Dennis) Wildish, auxiliary barge (1977-1996); Jeremy Taunton, houseboat, Faversham (1996-2003); Tim Goldsack (2003-2016); David Leal (2016- )
- Ordered: 1897
- Builder: F. G. Fay & Co, Southampton, England
- Launched: 1899
- Identification: Official Number 110055; National historic ship 1984
- Status: Sailing

General characteristics
- Class & type: Thames sailing barge
- Tons burthen: 67
- Length: 85 ft (26 m)
- Beam: 19.6 ft (6.0 m)
- Draught: 3 ft (0.91 m)approx
- Propulsion: Sail (1899-1949)
- Sail plan: sprit mainsail, topsail, mizzen
- Complement: 2

SB Decima is a steel Thames sailing barge constructed in Southampton in 1899 by J.G. Fay and Co, Southampton for E. J. Goldsmith of Grays, Essex. She is back under sail and resident on the River Darent in Dartford, Kent. She is a notable "Historic Ship".

== History ==
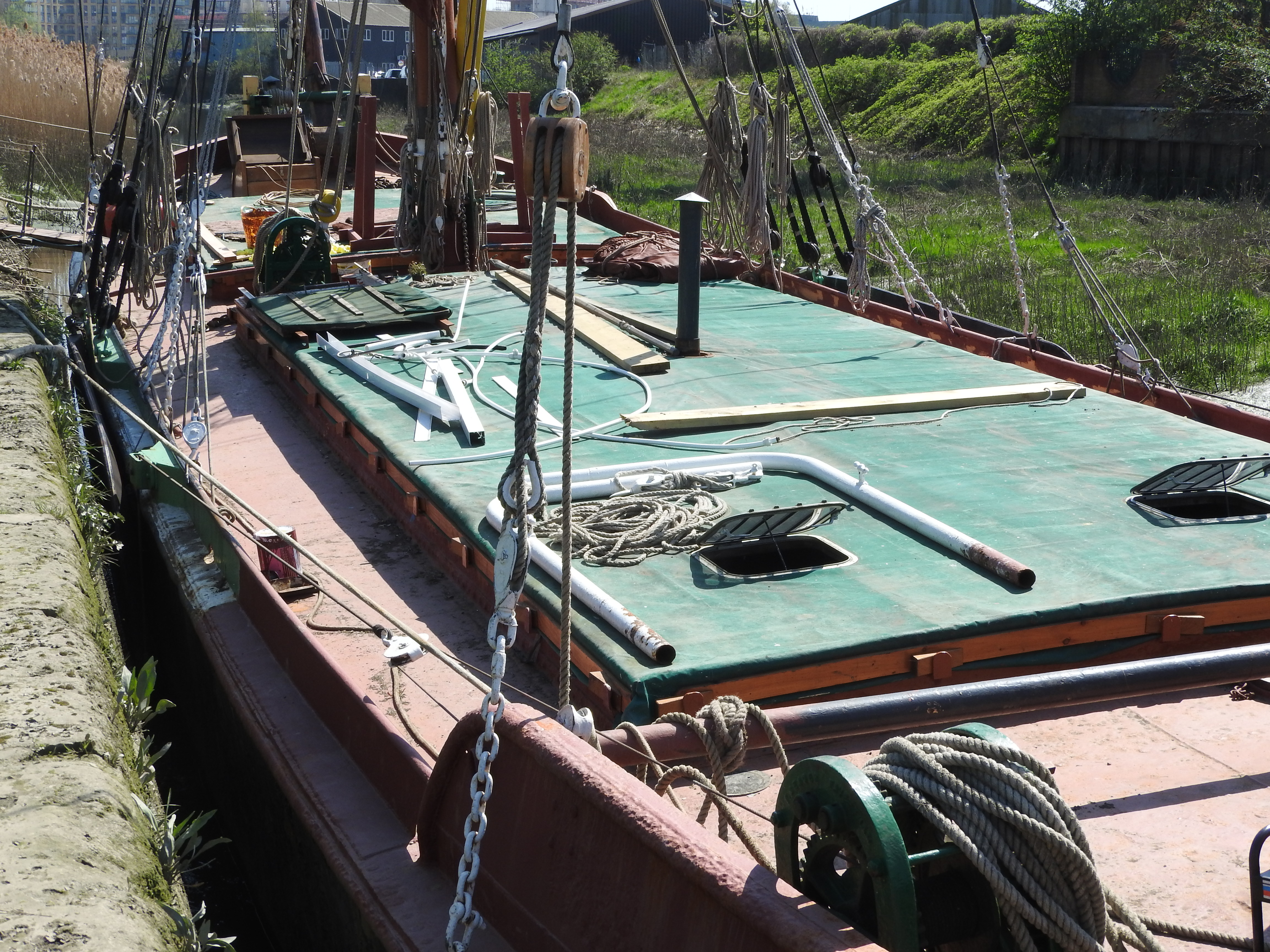

The ubiquitous Thames sailing barge had evolved over a century from the small swim-headed wooden river lighter, to the efficient river and estuary vessel with a rounded bow and stem post, that would take cargoes of up to 200 tons and regularly race to test design changes. The farmer sailed vessel used on short runs on the upper reaches of the London River had been eclipsed by the hoy companies running mixed cargoes from Margate and Ipswich to the west of London, and indeed doing occasional coastal work as far as the Tyne and the Lizard.

These companies owned not one but many of the wooden barges and were commissioning barges made of iron and steel. One of the largest of these companies was Goldsmiths of Grays in Essex, a company that owned 147 barges in 1905s against the fleet of 120 run by the London and Rochester Trading Company in the 1930s. A.P.C.M. was a collection of the fleets of cement firms and they had over 300.

In 1898 they commissioned twenty-two 160 tonners 'iron-pots' from Braby in Deptford and Fay and Co in Southampton. Braby barges had square chines which enhanced their windward performance at the expense of off the wind, all the Fay barges were all built to a similar design with rounded chines. The rounded chine led to dismal performance to windward and a heavy dependency on the leeboards. The SB Decima was built to this design by Fay and Co.

Barges built by Fay and Co in Southampton
Name	Official No.	Tons	Year	Built	Registered
ASTRILD	110162	69	1899	Southampton	London
BRITON	109988	80	1898	Southampton	London
CALLUNA	110043	64	1898	Southampton	London
CAMBRIA	110043	68	1899	Southampton	London
CARINA	110044	64	1898	Southampton	London
CIRCE	110147	68	1899	Southampton	London
DECIMA	110055	67	1899	Southampton	London
ESTEREL	110200	67	1899	Southampton	London
GLORIA	109991	57	1898	Southampton	London
GRECIAN	110011	80	1898	Southampton	London
LORNA	110042	64	1898	Southampton	London
MELISSA	110078	67	1899	Southampton	London
NAMARA	110079	67	1899	Southampton	London
NORMAN	109989	82/79	1898	Southampton	London
SAXON	110010	80/74	1898	Southampton	London
SCOT	110008	80	1898	Southampton	London
SCOTIA	110198	69	1899	Southampton	London
SENTA	110161	69	1899	Southampton	London
SIESTA	110083	67	1899	Southampton	London
SPARTAN	109990	67/82	1898	Southampton	London
SPERANZA	110054	67	1899	Southampton	London
TROJAN	109987	79	1898	Southampton	London
VARUNA	110124	69	1899	Southampton	London
VIROCCA	110123	69	1899	Southampton	London
YAMPA	110125	69	1899	Southampton	London
YARANA	110126	69	1899	Southampton	London

As a steel ship, skippers could push her hard without fear of busting the caulking, but the ironpots were built for steady not spectacular progress. At sea they could be recognised by an undersized topsail. The barges were 'seekers' but the skippers, as Goldsmith's employers they had less freedom on which cargoes to accept and the route, that was done by the office. Goldsmith were described by Benham as ´the Pickfords of the North Sea'.

She was involved in the great 70-mile-an-hour gale of 23 November 1938 when nine barges sought assistance from lifeboats along the Suffolk coast. The lifeboat took off her crew, and she made her own way to safety on a beach in Holland. She was sunk herself in 1940 when a deck cargo of timber broke free off Southend pier. She was recovered and resumed trading.

She was sold in 1949, and became a motor barge. Her rigging was stripped away and she continued trading. She took her last cargo in 1977: scrap metal to Queenborough.

=== Restoration ===
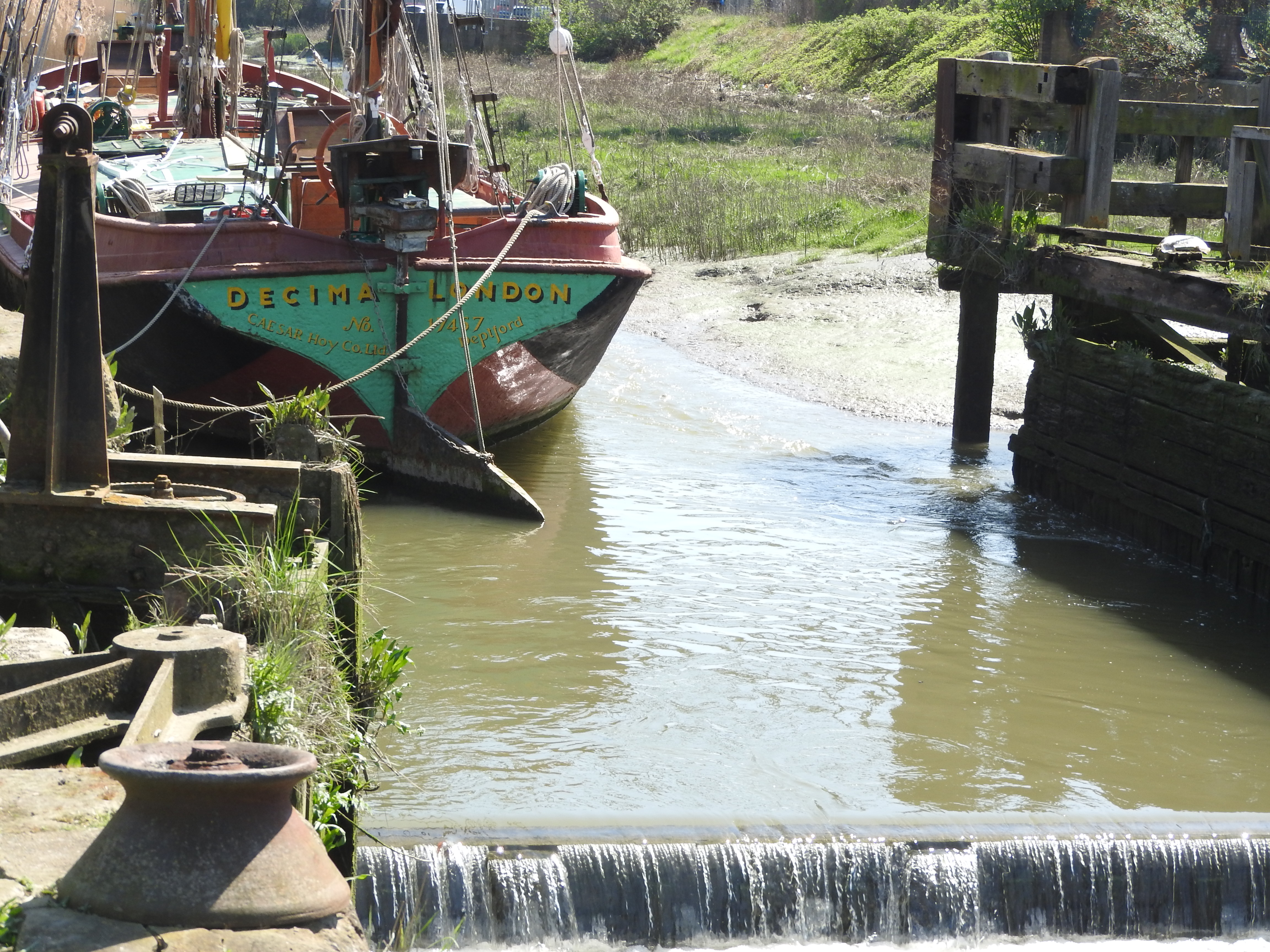
The Decima at the highest navigable wharf on the River Darent

Out of trade she was first sold to her last skipper, Beefy Wildish who re-rigged her as a charter barge with sails and motor. In 1999 she was sold to Jeremy Taunton for use as a houseboat. The well-known sailing barge restorer and shipwright Tim Goldsack, bought Decima in 2003. He completed a major restoration. She was gutted and a substantial number of the hull and deck plates were replaced. She was given a new set of rigging and good second-hand sails. A new Gardner 6LXB engine was fitted. She was sailing again in 2004.

Decima was sponsored by the jam maker, Wilkin & Sons of Tiptree, Essex in 2010, and their logo was displayed prominently on the topsail.

She was sold by Tim Goldsack to David Leal in 2016.

In 2018 she passed along the Dartford Creek to above Dartford lock.

== Rig and construction ==
The sails on a typical Thames sailing barge from 1900

The hull of a keel-less Thames barge was always a compromise between the cargo carrying capacity, and her sailing properties. Swim-head lighters could pack in the grain, but not sail competitively in rough water, let alone in lower reaches of the river, or on the estuary. Decima was built to work the estuary and do runs along and across the English Channel and the North Sea, she was built to an established specification and a design decision was made that should have a rounded chine and put greater use to her leeboards. Her hull was constructed of steel and was 85 feet (26 m) long, and 20 feet 6 inches (6.25 m) wide.

Thames barges could be rigged in many ways, and in her life she has been rigged with a loosefooted sprit-sail twice, in between acting as a motor barge. An indication of the original spars and sails can be surmised from E H March's detailed measurement of the SB Kathleen, a wooden barge doing similar work that was launched 3 years later. This is supported by a 1909 dated sailplan in Goldfinch's of Whitstable sailbook. In contrast, we have some details of the Jewish, that was built in 1899 in Barking then renamed as the HKD (official number 110075). She was a 65-ton, 88 feet (27 m) by 21 feet (6.4 m) vessel.

=== Spars ===
On the Kathleen, the mainmast was 35 feet (11 m) heel to hounds, 40 feet (12 m) heel to head, the topmast was 39 feet 6 inches (12.04 m) to hounds, 44 feet (13 m) to cap with a 9 feet (2.7 m) headstick. The sprit was 17 feet (5.2 m). The mizzen was 24 feet (7.3 m) with a 40 feet (12 m) sprit, and a 14 feet (4.3 m) boom. Her bowsprit was 22 feet 6 inches (6.86 m) with 18 feet (5.5 m) outboard.

On the HKD, the mainmast was 38 feet 6 inches (11.73 m) heel to hounds, 46 feet 6 inches (14.17 m) heel to head, the topmast was 40 feet (12 m) heel to hounds, 4 feet 6 inches (1.37 m) pole with a 10 feet (3.0 m) headstick. The sprit was 58 feet (18 m). The mizzen was 17 feet (5.2 m) with a 26 feet (7.9 m) sprit, and a 15 feet (4.6 m) boom. Her bowsprit was 26 feet (7.9 m) outboard.

=== Sails ===
On the Kathleen, the mainsail was 27 feet 3 inches (8.31 m) (weather), by 34 feet 6 inches (10.52 m)(head) with a lee of 49 feet 0 inches (14.94 m) and a of foot 35 feet 6 inches (10.82 m), giving a sail area of 285 square yards (238 m^{2}).

The topsail was 34 feet (10 m) (weather), with a lee of 34 feet (10 m) and a of foot 31 feet (9.4 m), giving a sail area of 128 square yards (107 m^{2}).

The foresail was 31 feet (9.4 m) (weather), with a lee of 30 feet (9.1 m) and a of foot 26 feet (7.9 m), giving a sail area of 91 1/2 square yards (76.5 m^{2}).

The jib was 42 feet (13 m) (weather), with a lee of 28 feet (8.5 m) and a foot of 18 feet 4 inches (5.59 m). Her jib topsails were 48 feet (15 m) (weather), with a lee of 33 feet (10 m) and a foot of 21 feet (6.4 m), giving a sail area of 55 square yards (46 m^{2}), and a lighter set with 56 feet (17 m) (weather), with a lee of 38 feet (12 m) and a of foot 24 feet 6 inches (7.47 m), giving a sail area of 72 square yards (60 m^{2}).

Her mizzen was 13 feet 6 inches (4.11 m) (weather), by 12 feet 0 inches (3.66 m)(head) with a lee of 23 feet 6 inches (7.16 m) and a of foot 13 feet 6 inches (4.11 m) giving a sail area of 41 1/2 square yards (34.7 m^{2}).

On the HKD the sail measurements were roughly similar. She carried 713 square yards (596 m^{2}) of canvas in total.

The sails on a Thames barge are red ochre in colour. The sailcloth is of flax, and to be kept in a supple and waterproof condition it must be dressed. Importantly, the flax must not dry out or will chafe against the rigging or against the rails when not in use. The sailmaker's exact formula is a closely guarded secret, and sailormen believe that some dressings are faster than others. It is based on red-ochre (protects against UV) suspended in a mixture of fish oils, linseed oil, seawater and horse urine. The HKD required 32 imperial gallons (150 L) of sail dressing annually.

== See also ==
- Thalatta
- Will (Thames barge)
