= Flyboat =

European light vessel of Dutch origin

The flyboat (also spelled fly-boat or fly boat) was a European light vessel of Dutch origin developed primarily as a mercantile cargo carrier, although many served as warships in an auxiliary role because of their agility. These vessels could displace between 70 and 200 tons, and were used in the late 16th and early 17th centuries. The name was subsequently applied to a number of disparate vessels which achieved high speeds or endurance. At the beginning of the 17th century, they were replaced by the fluyt, which in England was also known as a fly-boat.

== Origin ==
The name "flyboat" is derived from Dutch vlieboot, a boat with a shallow enough draught to be able to navigate a shallow vlie or river estuary, such as the Vlie. Armed flyboats were used by the naval forces of the Dutch rebels, the Watergeuzen, in the beginning of the Eighty Years' War, and comprised the Dutch contribution to the English Armada. The type resembled a small carrack and had two or at most three masts, a high board, and a dozen iron cannons. Small, inexpensive, and manoeuvrable, it was ideal for privateering activities in the European coastal waters, and was soon imitated by privateers or pirates of other nations. The Dutch navy, and their enemies, the Dunkirkers, at first extensively employed flyboats. In 1588, the army of Alexander Farnese was blocked in Dunkirk by a fleet of 30 Dutch flyboats commanded by Lieutenant Admiral Justin of Nassau, preventing him from joining the Spanish Armada to invade England.

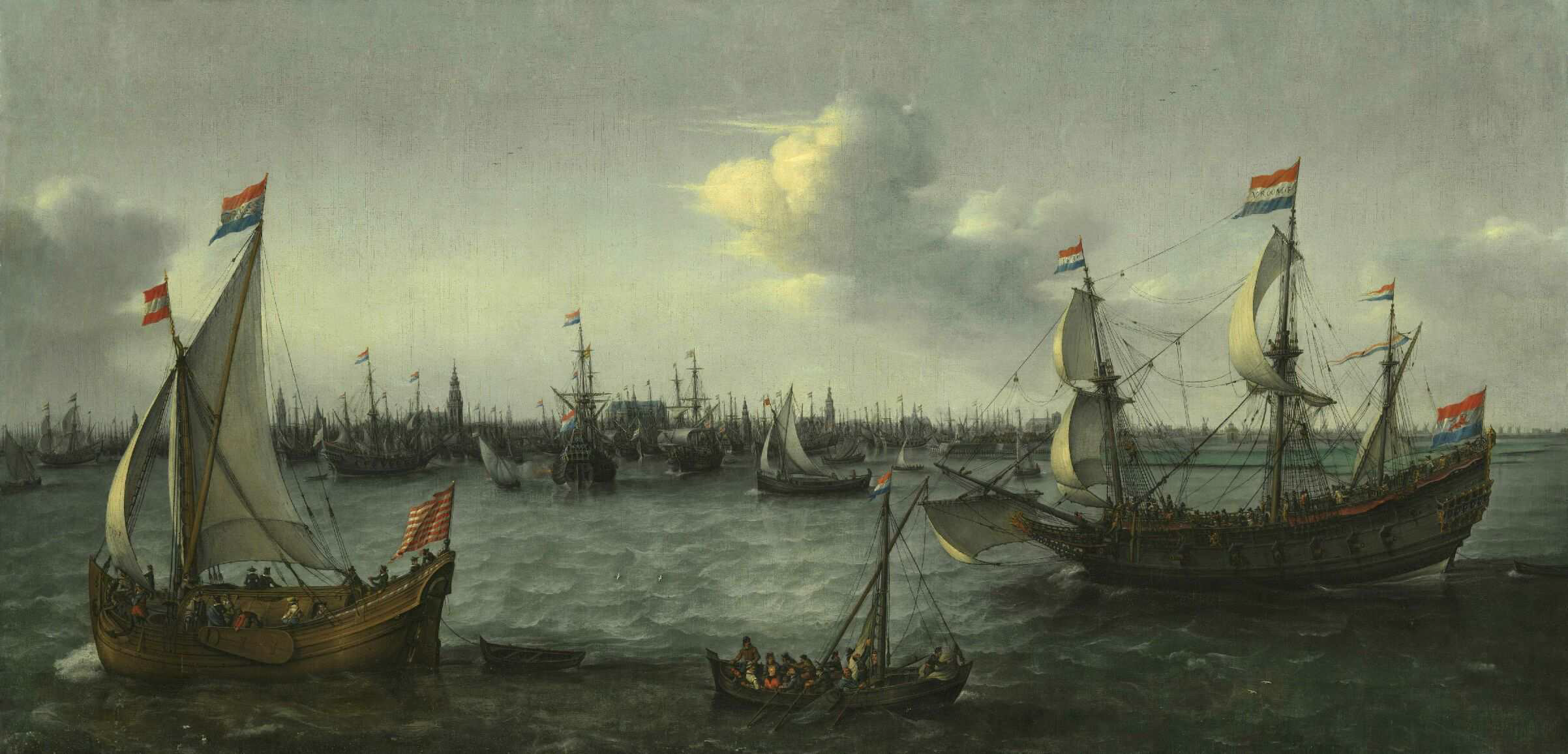
The Harbour in Amsterdam (1630) by Hendrick Cornelisz Vroom; Vlieboot (Flyboat) on the left, Galleon on the right

In the early 17th century, the warship type became obsolete by the invention by the Dunkirkers of the frigate, then a small galleon type, although flyboats continued to be adapted in wartime for naval use until the 1670s. However, civilian Dutch vlieboten continued to be built and evolved during the 18th century into much larger cromsters (kromstevens), then flat coastal cargo ships up to 1200 tons. At the same time, the term flyboat was used for a swift fishing vessel on the Atlantic. In the 19th century, the term was used in England for canal boats, resembling small Dutch cromsters.

== Other types of flyboat ==
=== 12th-century galleys ===
What might be seen as a prototype of the flyboat was the fleet of war galleys that were developed by Richard the Lionheart in the 12th century. They were similar to Viking longship design and were created for fast movement and riverine warfare, and were stationed from Portsmouth to Rouen to Les Andelys and other points along the Seine.

=== UK canal boats ===
==== Planing vessels ====
An "express boat" service was started on the Glasgow, Paisley and Ardrossan Canal in 1830. One of its employees, William Houston, was guiding an empty horse-drawn boat when the horse took fright and bolted. Expecting the horse soon to tire, he hung on, but was amazed when the boat rose up onto its bow wave and shot off along the canal at high speed. Mr Houston was canny enough to realise the potential, and soon travellers were being hauled along the canals at high speed in an early example of planing.

This canal—11 miles without locks into the centre of Glasgow—was an ideal situation for this venture. Once the boat was planing, the wash that damaged the canal banks largely disappeared, and by 1835, flat iron boats up to 65 feet made 323,290 passenger trips at 10 mph in a year. Services were established on the Forth and Clyde and on the Shropshire Union Canal flyboats with single horse-pulled, 22-ton loads at 10 mph as late as 1847. They were also called "swift boats" or "gig boats".

Occurring a year after the opening of the Liverpool and Manchester Railway, this development sparked enormous interest in the canal world. Books were published by Sir William Armstrong Fairburn and Sir John Benjamin Macneill. The latter records experiments on the Paddington Canal in London attended by Thomas Telford and Charles Babbage. They hoped that steamboats running on the canals would be able to attain these high speeds, thus fighting off the threat of the railways.

A series of experiments conducted by the young John Scott Russell, for which he eventually received the gold medal of the Royal Society of Edinburgh and initiated research in solitons, demonstrated that the phenomenon could only be achieved in very shallow canals, and that steamboats needed very different conditions.

Flyboats pulled by one or more horses continued to be used in Britain and Ireland for a number of years, and even in America, but ultimately the railway proved the winner.

High-speed running of this kind is no longer permitted on UK canals, with a blanket speed limit of four miles per hour in the modern, leisure-dominated era.

==== Canal carrying-company flyboats: long-distance overnight services ====
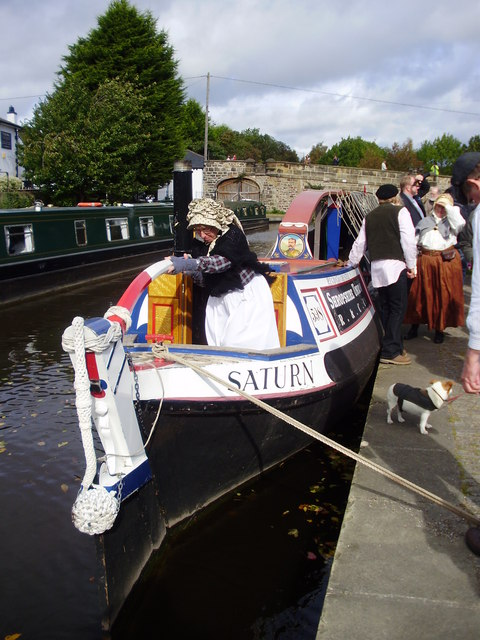
Saturn, a restored 1906 fly-boat

A fly-boat is also a narrowboat which works all day and all night (24/7) on the English canal system without mooring. All-male professional crews, chosen for their skill and experience, slept in different watches at night and day to keep progress as fast as possible. They became common around 1834 and later attempted to emulate the railways by running to timetables so that deliveries could be assured. Some of these boats were operated by railway companies, as a method of providing services into rival railway territory.

The design of the hull lines was finer and more streamlined than other narrowboats, limiting cargo capacity but increasing top speed. Being operated by the canal owners, these express services had priority over all other traffic when encountering congestion such as at locks. Time-sensitive cargoes such as cheese and other valuable produce paid a premium for the fast delivery, which survived until the outbreak of World War I.

One 1906 fly-boat from the Shropshire Union Canal, Saturn, survives in preservation today and is used for historical trips and education.
