= The Surrender of Breda =

Painting by Diego Velazquez

- La rendición de Breda, Las lanzas (Spanish)
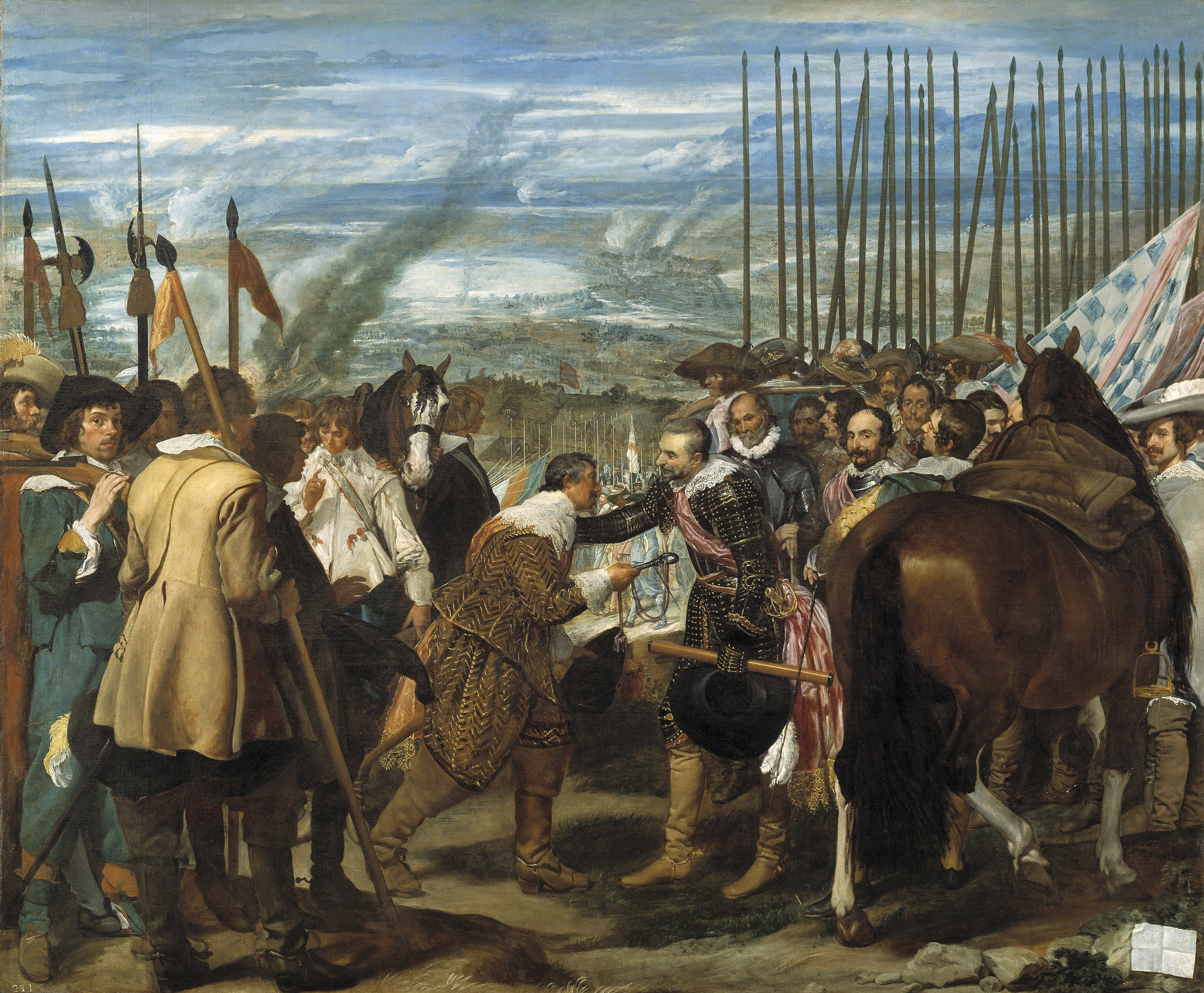
- Artist: Diego Velázquez
- Year: 1634–1635
- Type: Oil on canvas
- Dimensions: 307 cm × 367 cm (121 in × 144 in)
- Location: Museo del Prado, Madrid, Spain

La rendición de Breda (English: The Surrender of Breda, also known as Las lanzas – The Lances) is a painting by the Spanish Golden Age painter Diego Velázquez. He painted it during the years 1634 and 1635, inspired by his visit to Italy with Ambrogio Spinola, the Genoese-born Spanish general who conquered Breda on June 5, 1625. The painting depicts the exchange of the key of Breda from the Dutch to the Spanish.

It is considered one of Velázquez's best works. Velázquez composed The Surrender of Breda into two halves, which included the Dutch leader Justinus van Nassau and the Spanish Genoese general Spinola. Jan Morris has called it "one of the most Spanish of all pictures".

== Background ==
The Surrender of Breda depicts a military victory, the 1624 Siege of Breda, during the Eighty Years War. This war began due to a revolt against Philip II of Spain by the Seventeen Provinces, which today includes the Netherlands, Belgium and Luxembourg, led by William of Orange, which led to the independence of the seven northern provinces, called the United Provinces (of the Netherlands), referred in history as the Dutch Republic. The southern provinces, including Flanders, Luxembourg and the others, were restored to Spanish rule due to the military and political talent of the Duke of Parma, especially at the Siege of Antwerp (1584–1585). Hence, these provinces became known as the Spanish Netherlands.

Velázquez captured the end of the battle, as he also differentiated the two sides: the Dutch and the Spanish. The painting presents the Spanish as a strong force, while including both sides of the battle and depicting facial expressions of fatigue that reflect the reality of war.

The painting was commissioned by Philip IV of Spain between 1630 and 1635 for the palace of Buen Retiro along the eastern city limits of Madrid. The painting was intended to glorify the military accomplishments and acquisition by the Spanish, uplifting Philip IV. At the time, Spain was in economic decline. The Surrender of Breda was displayed in the Hall of Realms with nineteen other paintings.

The decoration of the Hall of Realms was directed by the Spanish minister, Gaspar de Guzmán, Count-Duke of Olivares. Velazquez was requested to paint relating to the subject of horse riding, one battle scene, and The Surrender of Breda. This work completed by Velazquez represents the most significant and undaunted painting in the Hall of Realms, as well as one of Velazquez's best works. Through the hundreds of paintings that Guzmán made use of, The Surrender of Breda would become the most important piece in the Hall of Realms.

== Description ==
=== Composition ===
Velázquez addresses the details of many individuals by painting the setting across two halves, and the battle takes place in the background. The surrender portion of the scene takes place in the foreground, with the leading individuals placed clearly in the center. The focus of the composition is in the foreground, where the exchange of the keys is shown in the very front, and in the background, the smoky sky shows evidence of destruction and death.

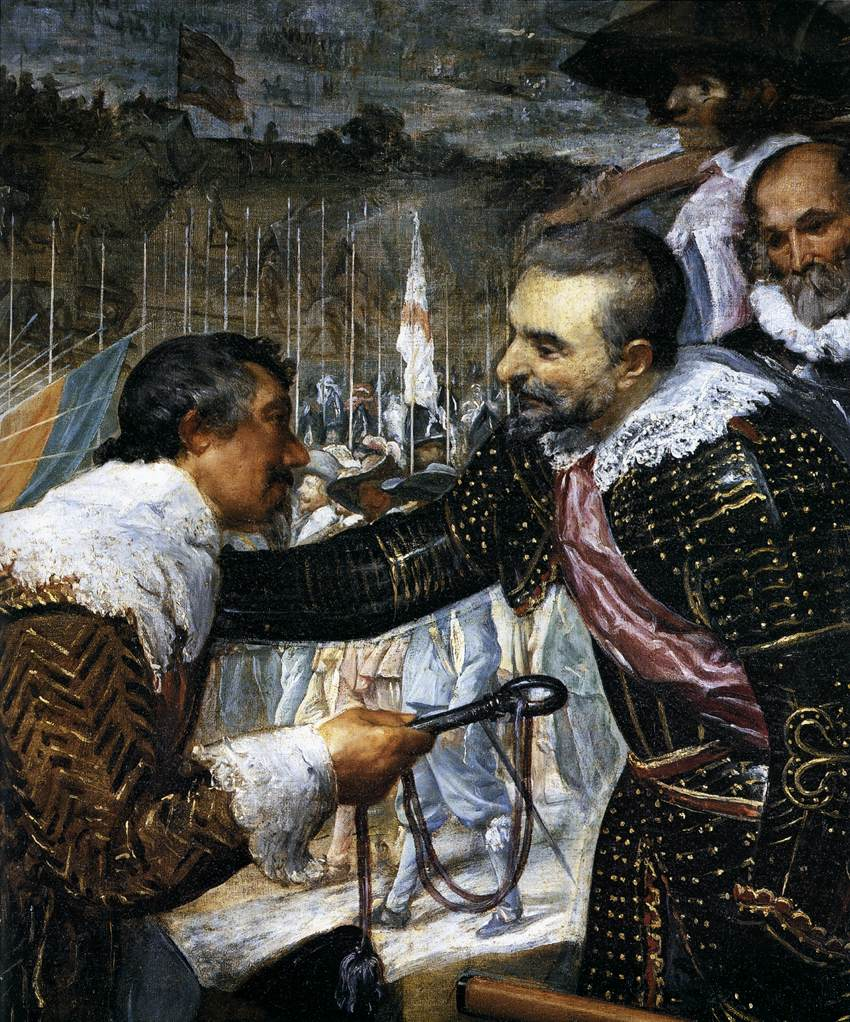
Exchange of the key to Spain

The painting depicts many Spanish soldiers in comparison to the fewer number of Dutch soldiers, and the Dutch weapons appear to have been either destroyed, thrown away or even surrendered as a result of their performance of the battle. In contrast, the victorious Spaniards stand before a mass of upright lances on the right side of the composition. José Ortega y Gasset described these lances as "the backbone of the entire picture and largely responsible for the impression of calm permeating this essentially lively scene." Velázquez used effective perception and aerial techniques that support The Surrender of Breda as one of his finest works.

=== Color ===
The painting's relatively light tonality and bright colors reveal the influence of Venetian painting. There is no use of violent reds or bright blues; rather, calm brown colors with dark shadows in the foreground are used. Also, there is believed to be a connection between Velázquez's use of color, as he had taken a trip to Italy to study Renaissance art. In addition to the color techniques he became equipped to, Velázquez also gained improved skills with space, perspective and light.

=== Subject matter ===
At the center of the composition, Justinus van Nassau is seen surrendering and handing over the key of the city to Spinola and Spain. Spinola, the Genoese general, commanded the Spanish tercios, which included pikemen, swordsmen, and musketeers as displayed in the painting.

=== Painting materials ===
An in-depth analysis and investigation was conducted to examine the painting around 1989 in Museo Prado. The analysis found that Velázquez used many of the same pigments that he had used in other paintings. These pigments included lead white with calcite, azurite mixed with small amounts of charcoal black, ochres, and vermilion. The painting was produced on canvas that is sized 307 cm × 367 cm (121 in × 144 in)

== Reception ==
The response to Velazquez's artwork was grand at the very least, with the critical reaction being that The Surrender of Breda was the most impressive Spanish works of art. Also, the artwork solidified Velazquez's effort as the most superb depiction of Spanish Baroque, provided that Baroque art was closely connected to humanity and how people should be seen and represented.

== Influence ==
One of Velázquez's contemporaries, Peter Paul Rubens, has been cited to be an inspiration for the work connected to The Surrender of Breda. Despite differences in style between the two Baroque artists, Rubens' prior works such as The Reconciliation of Esau and Jacob, produced in 1624, has resemblance in terms of its composition and philosophical concepts. More commonly, Velázquez's piece has been tied to Rubens' Meeting of King Ferdinand of Hungary and Cardinal, completed in 1635. The possibility of influence on Rubens' later work has been argued, as both Velazquez and Rubens completed their work around the same time. More likely, both artists produced very similar work in addition to having such a close relationship. Velázquez's work also seems to have been inspired by his trip to Italy with Spinola.

== Historical accuracy ==
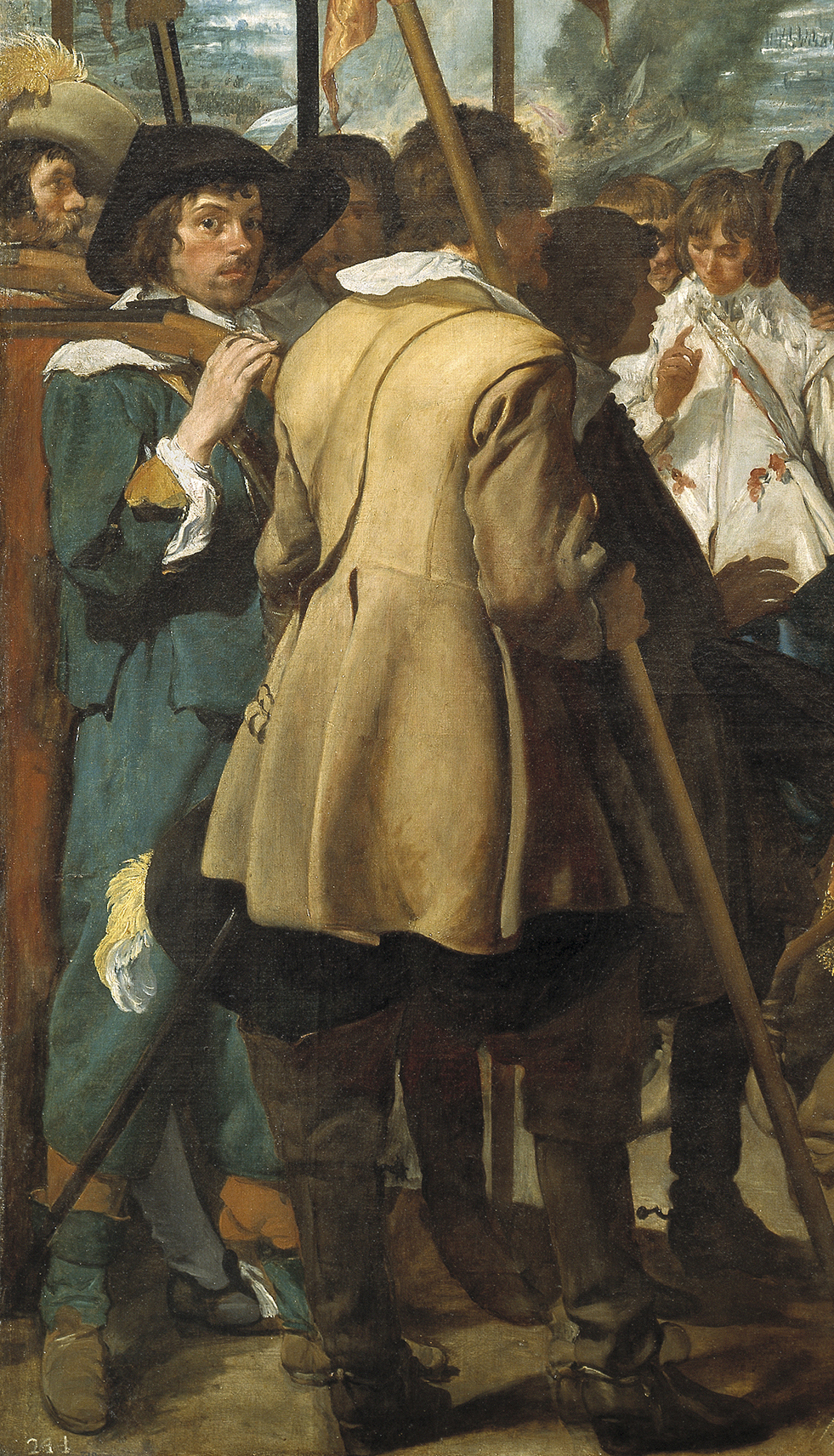
Detail from the painting

The painting illustrates the exchange of keys that occurred three days after the capitulation between Spain and the Netherlands was signed on June 5, 1625. Hence, the focus of the painting is not on the battle itself but rather the reconciliation. At the center of the painting, literally and figuratively, is the key given to Ambrogio Spinola by Justin of Nassau. Thie painting is notable for its static and sentimental qualities, as Velázquez left out the blood and gore that would normally be linked to the violence of such battles.

According to the statement made by eye-witnesses, both [Spinola and Nassau] had dismounted and Spinola awaited the arrival of Justin surrounded by a “crown” of princes and officers of high birth. The governor then presented himself with his family, kinsfolk and distinguished students of the military academy, who had been shut up in the place during the siege. Spinola greeted and embraced his vanquished opponent with a kindly expression and still more kindly words, in which praised the courage and endurance of the protracted defense.

One of Spinola's flags in the painting

The extraordinary respect and dignity that Spinola demonstrated towards the Dutch Army is praised through The Surrender of Breda. Spinola “had forbidden his troops to jeer at, or otherwise abuse the vanquished Dutch, and, according to a contemporary report, he himself saluted Justin.” The painting demonstrates the glimpses of humanity that can be exposed as a result of the war and commends Spinola's consideration for Nassau and the Dutch Army.

Velázquez's relationship with Spinola makes The Surrender of Breda especially historically accurate. The depiction of Spinola is undoubtedly accurate, and Spinola's memory of the battle contributed to the perspective with which Velázquez composed the painting. Velázquez “desired in his modest way to raise a monument to one of the most humane captains of the day, by giving permanence to his true figure in a manner of which he alone had the secret.”

Nevertheless, Velázquez made one remarkable mistake. Probably following Spinola's description, he painted the Dutch Prince's Flag (Prinsenvlag), which is dipped on the painting behind Justinus van Nassau's head to salute the victorious Spaniards, as horizontal tricolour of blue, red and white (from the top down). In fact, the color scheme was orange, white, blue (some years later, orange was replaced by red).

== In popular culture ==
The motion picture Alatriste, a 2006 Spanish epic historical fiction war film directed by Agustín Díaz Yanes, contains a scene showing the surrender of Breda as the basis for the painting.

== See also ==
- List of works by Diego Velázquez

== Sources ==
- Justi, Carl. Diego Velázquez and his Times. London: H. Grevel & Co., 1889.
- López-Rey, José. Velázquez’ Work and World. Greenwich, CT: New York Graphic Society, 1968.
- Morris, James. Spain. London: Faber & Faber, 1964.
- Museo Nacional del Prado, "The Surrender of Breda, or The Lances" (accessed July 3, 2009).
- Ortega y Gasset, José. Velazquez. New York: Random House, 1953. OCLC 989292513.
- White, John Manchip. Diego Velazquez: Painter and Courtier. Chicago: Rand McNally & Company, 1969.
