= Jan van Ravesteyn =

Dutch painter

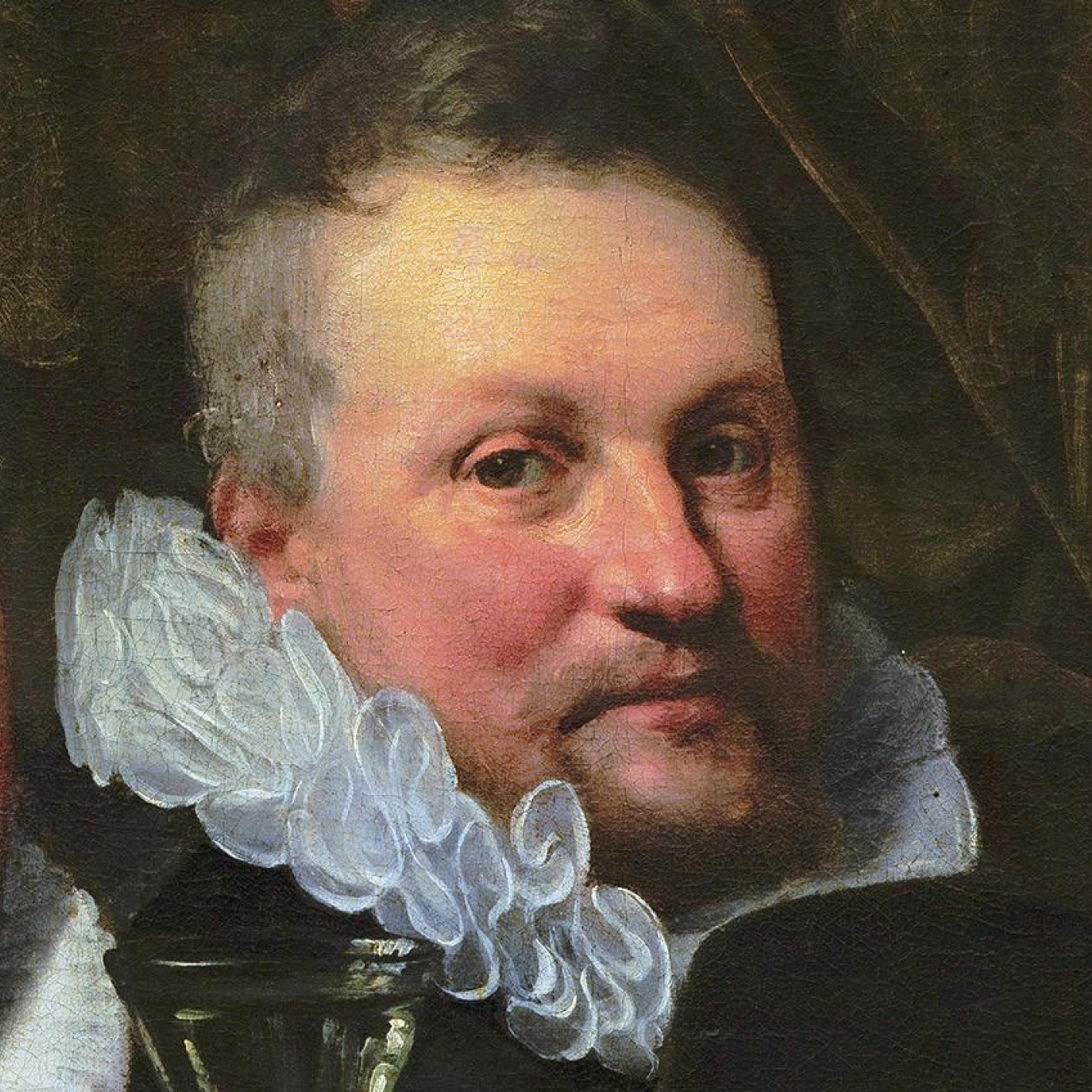
- Self-portrait (1618)
- Born: Jan van Ravesteyn c. 1572; The Hague, Seventeen Provinces
- Died: 1657 (aged 84–85); The Hague, Dutch Republic
- Known for: Painting
- Movement: Baroque

Jan Anthoniszoon (abbr. Anthonisz.) van Ravesteyn (c. 1572 – buried 21 June 1657) was a successful portrait painter to the Dutch court in The Hague.

== Biography ==
Van Ravesteyn was born in The Hague. It is unknown who taught him how to paint, but he was a follower of the Delft portrait painter Michiel Jansz van Mierevelt. Van Ravesteyn is mentioned there in the city archives 1597. From 1598 until his death he lived in the Hague, where in 1598 he became a member of the Guild of St. Luke of the Hague. In 1604 he married Anna Arentsz van Berendrecht and in the same year he was mentioned as a good painter by Karel van Mander (though his earliest dated works are from 1611). In 1608 he bought a house on the Molstraat and in 1628 he moved in the Molstraat. In 1640 his wife was buried and in the same year his daughter Marie married one of his pupils, the painter Adriaen Hanneman. In 1654 he moved to the Nobelstraat next to the house of his daughter. In 1656 he left the guild with a group of dissatisfied painter friends and was one of the founders of the Confrerie Pictura. He was a Catholic and his name occurs often as a witness in the records of the church in the Molstraat, such as for the marriage of his daughter Agnes in 1641 with Willem van Culemborgh. His portrait was painted by Sir Anthony van Dyck and he produced Schutterstuk works. His workshop produced many portraits for the royal house of Nassau and he competed with Miereveld for several commissions.

Van Ravesteyn was in turn, the teacher of Dirck Abrahamsz., Leendert Barthouts, Johannes Harmensz. Borsman, Aelbert Dircksz. Coeppier, Pieter Craen, Jacob Dirksz. van den Enden, Fransise de Goltz, Adriaen Hanneman, Barent Jansz., Thomas Ouwater, Clement Ram, Jan Rassenbourch, Frederick Sonnius, Dirck Verlaer, Jan Pous Voet and Pauwels Willemsz.

== Works ==
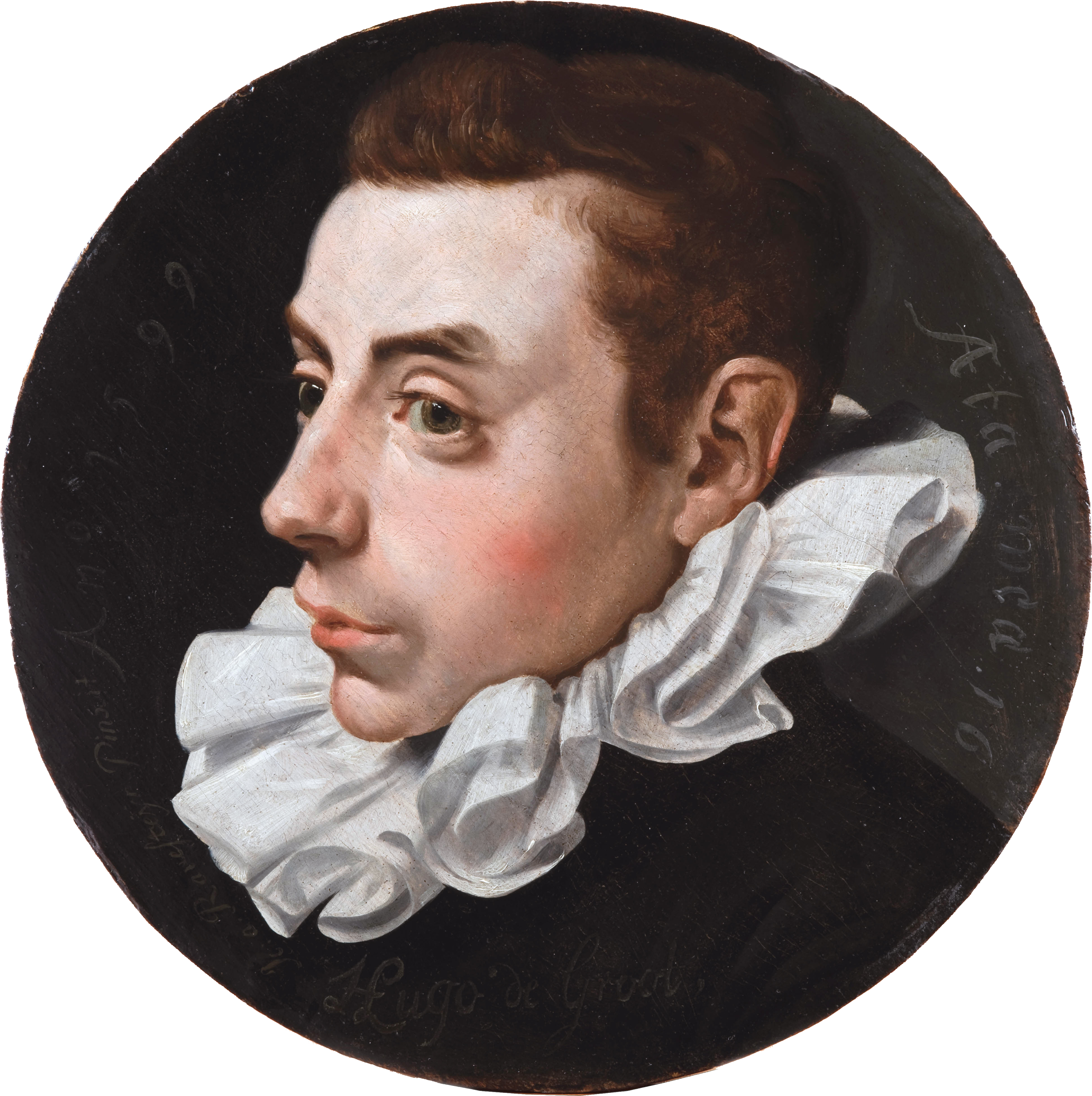
Hugo Grotius at the age of sixteen (1599)

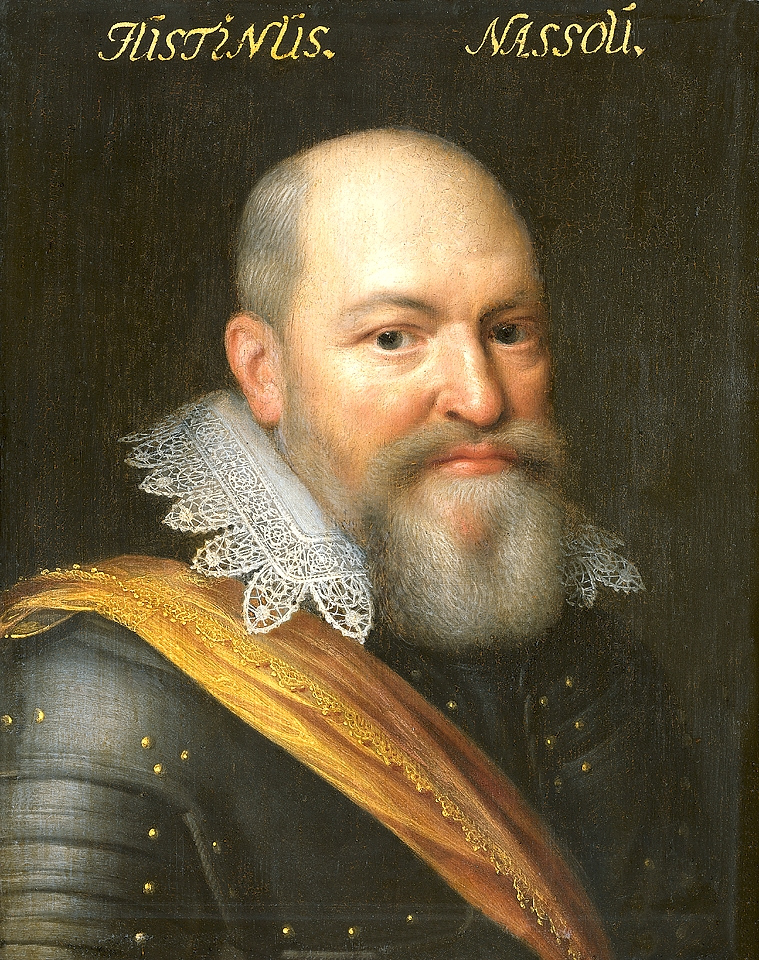
Portrait of Justinus of Nassau

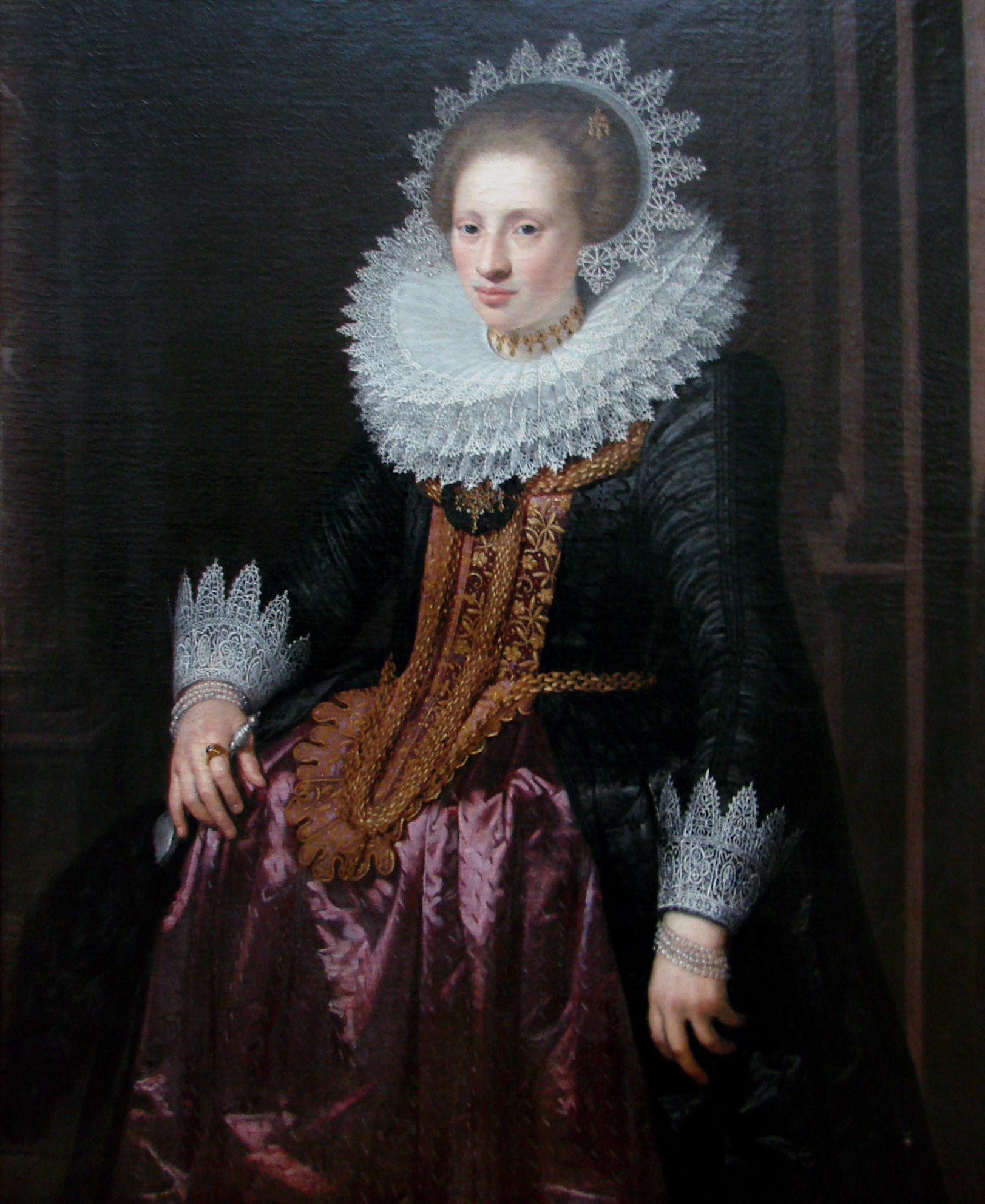
Portrait of a Woman (1620)

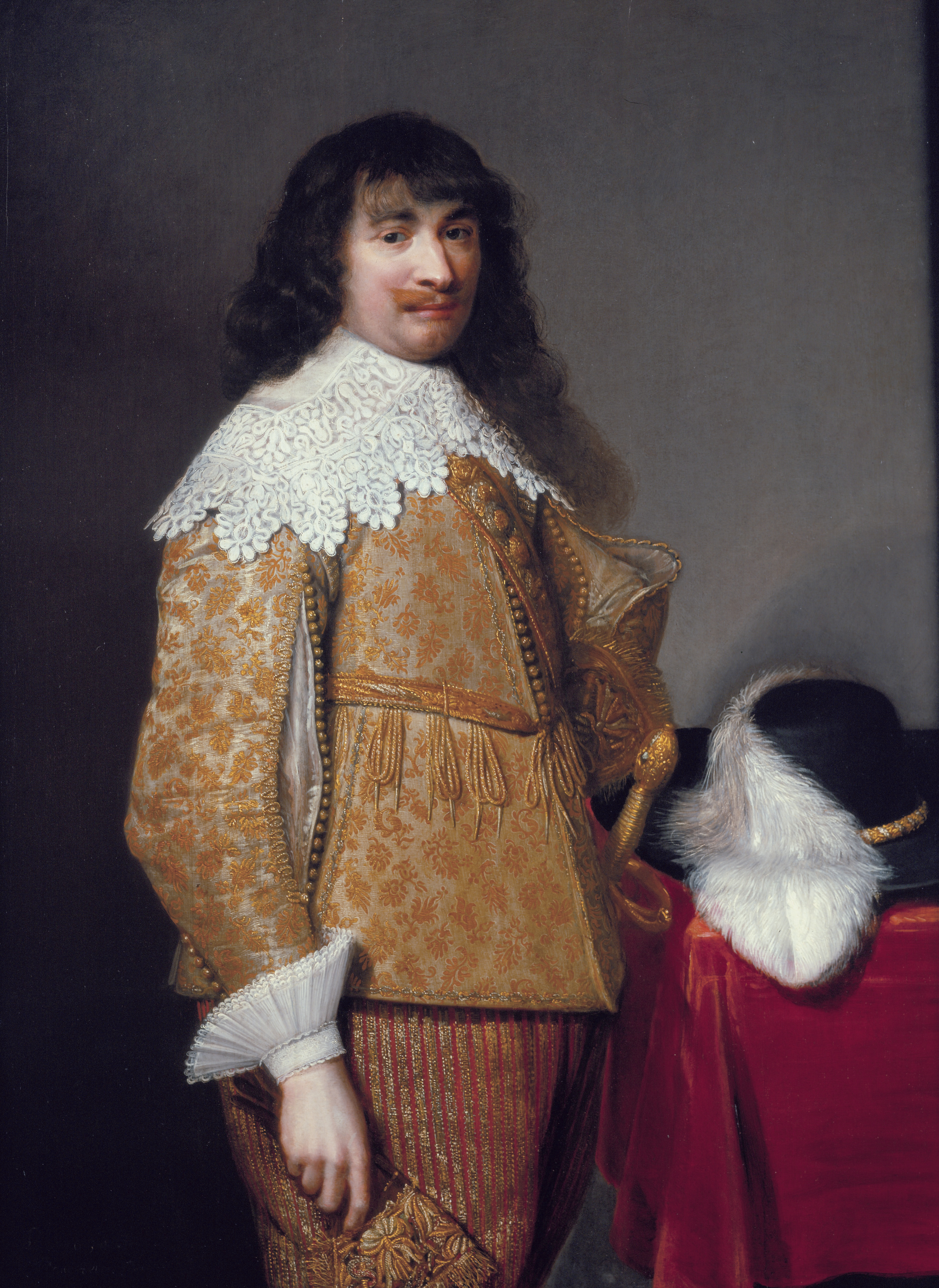
An unknown officer (1634)

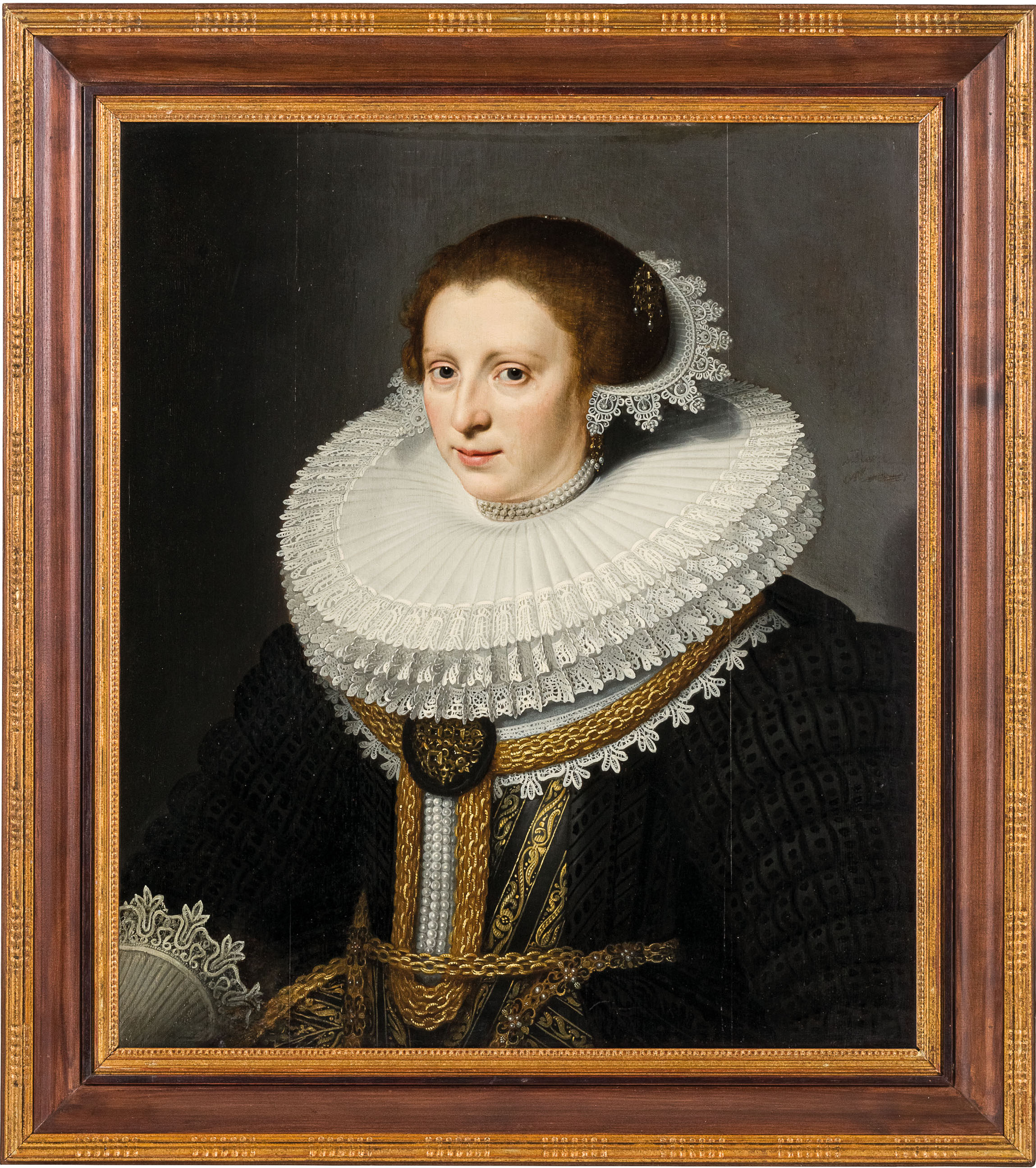
Portrait of a lady (1635)
