= Spritsail =

Type of sail

Spritsail: Edges: Luff Head Leech Foot Corners: Tack Throat Peak Clew

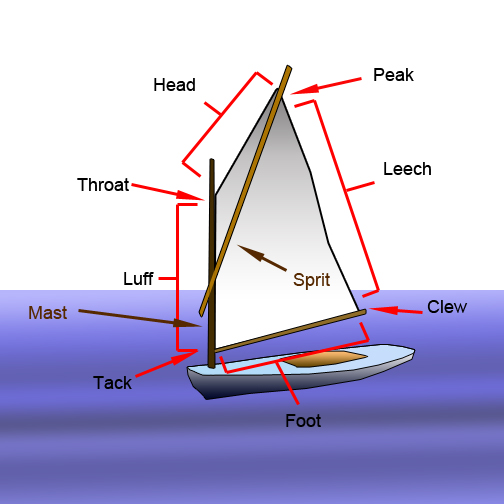
Diagram of a four-cornered spritsail

The spritsail is a four-sided, fore-and-aft sail that is supported at its highest points by the mast and a diagonally running spar known as the sprit. The foot of the sail can be stretched by a boom or held loose-footed just by its sheets. A spritsail has four corners: the throat, peak, clew, and tack. The Spritsail can also be used to describe a rig that uses a spritsail.

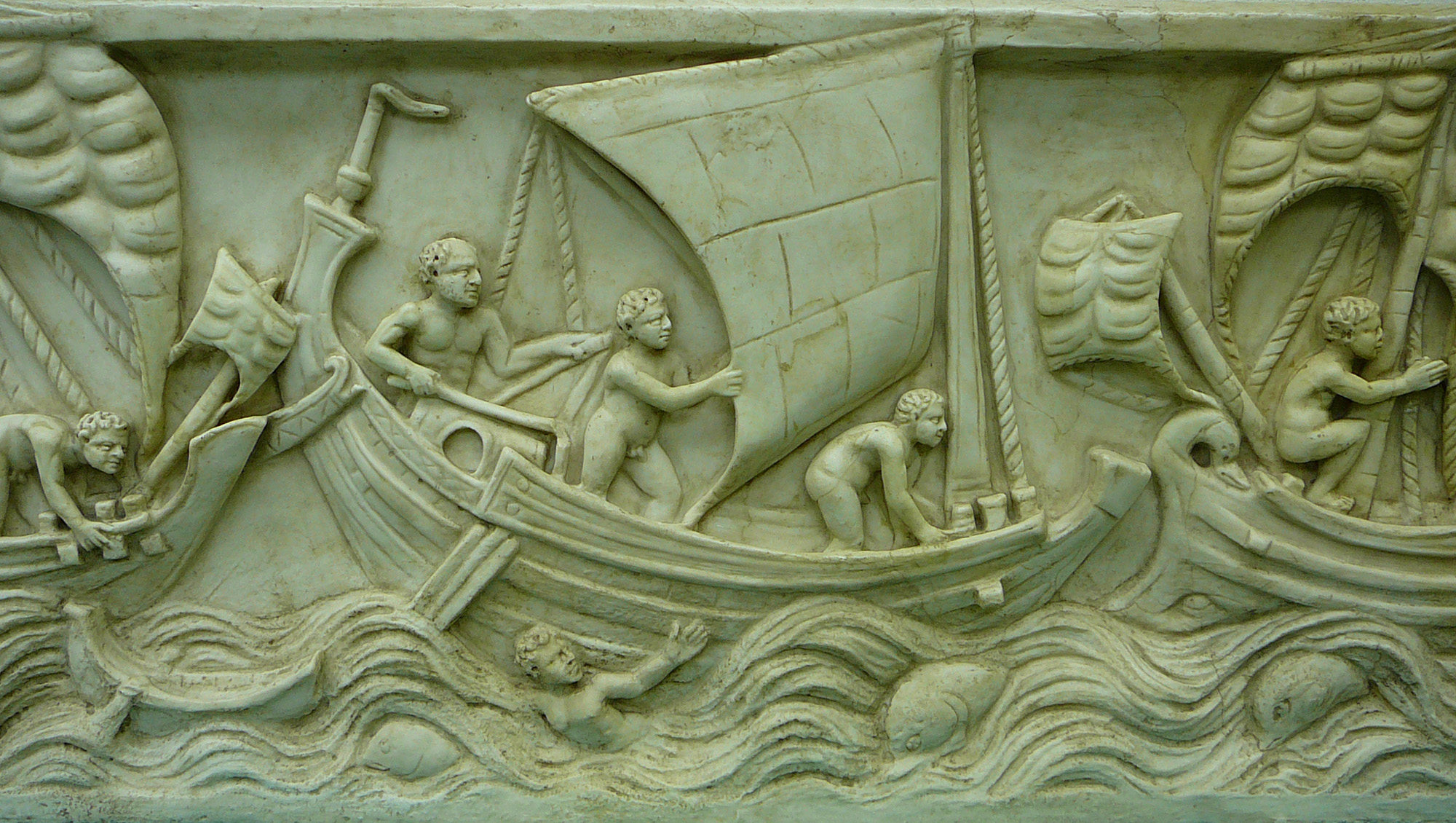
Spritsails appeared in the 2nd century BC in the Aegean Sea on small Greek craft. Here a spritsail used on a Roman merchant ship (3rd century AD).

Historically, spritsails were the first European fore-and-aft rigs, appearing in Greco-Roman navigation in the 2nd century BC.

== The rig ==
The luff of the sail is bound to the mast, but unlike the gaff rig where the head is bound to a spar, this rig supports the leech of the sail by means of a diagonal spar or spars named a sprit (/spriːt/ ). The forward end of the sprit spar is attached to the mast, with the after end of the sprit spar attached to the peak. The sprit is steadied and controlled from the deck by a pair of wire vangs (/wæŋ/ WANG) attached to the peak of the sail. It is said to be the ancestor of the common gaff rig that evolved in 16th-century Holland. The foot of the sail may be bent to a boom, or be loose-footed and just controlled by its sheets.

== Barges ==
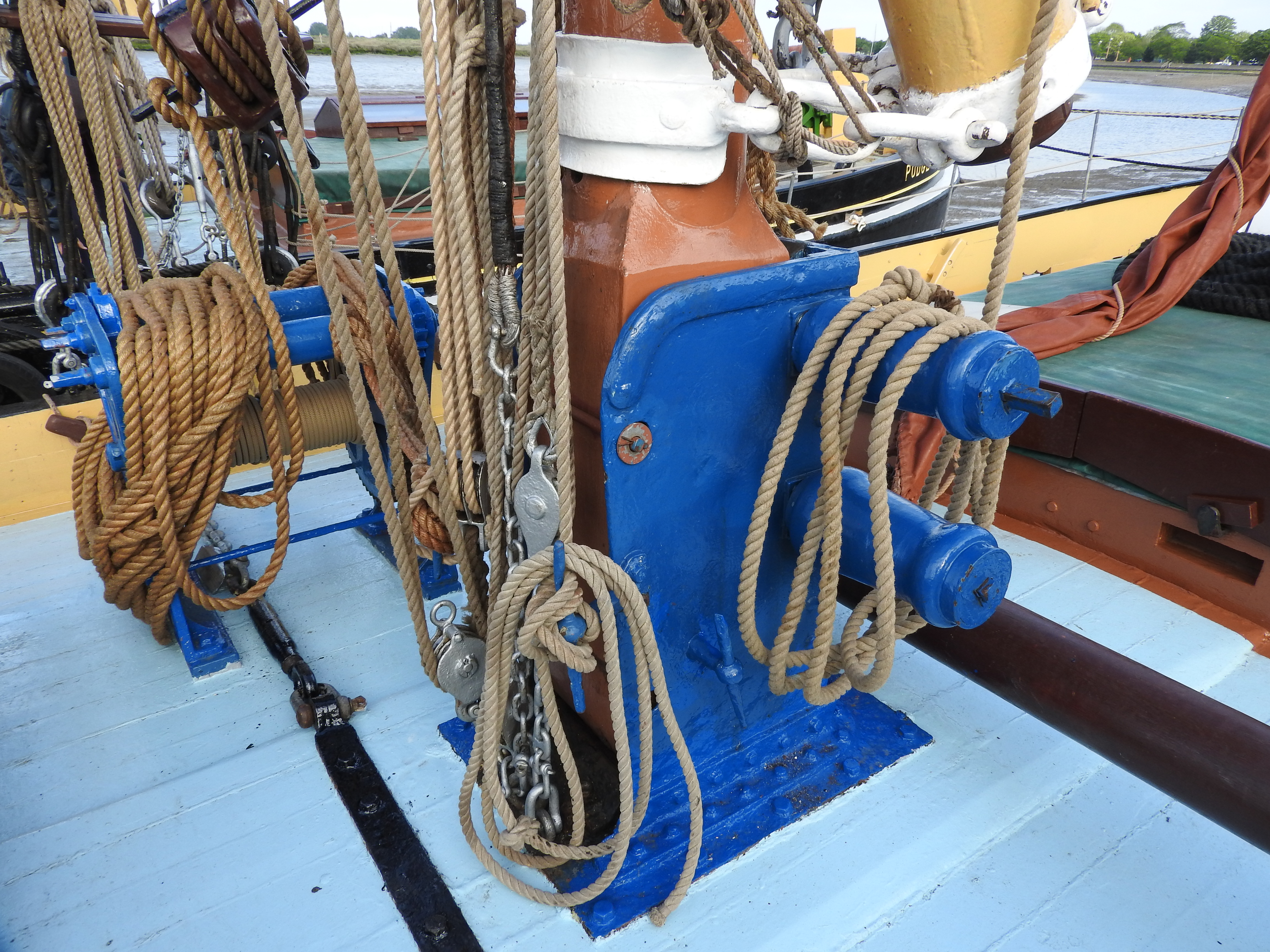
Mast case (tabernacle) on SB Centaur

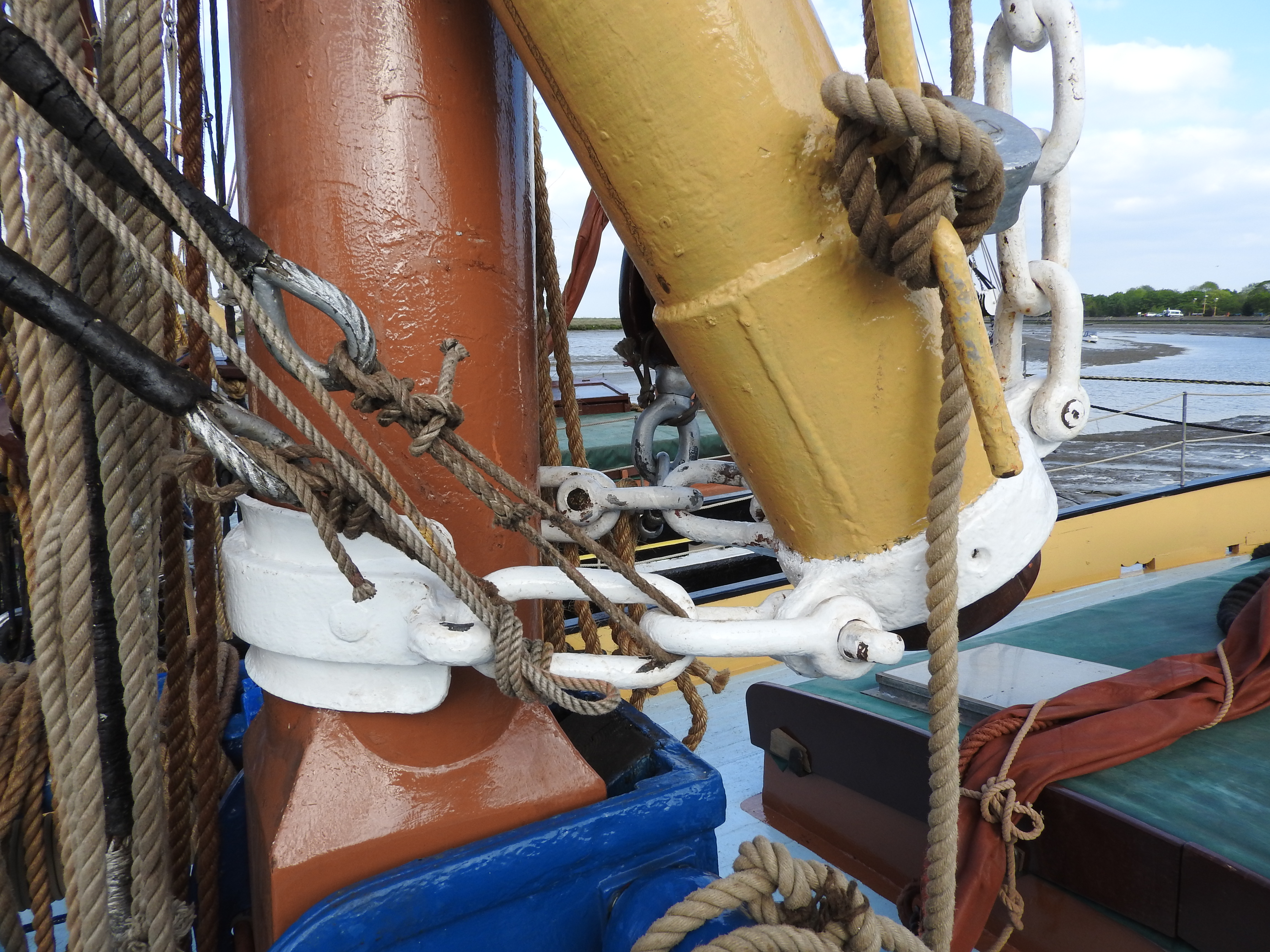
Muzzle on SB Centaur

The spritsail was best known from its use in the Thames sailing barge, which employs two similarly sized spars to form the framework for the sail area. In a barge, the mast is stepped vertically in a mast case or tabernacle, whilst the sprit is suspended by chain stanliffs (standing lifts) from the hounds at the mast head at an angle of about 30° from vertical, with sprit to the starboard side of the mast. The heel of the sprit is secured to the mast, by the muzzle, which allows the sprit the freedom to move laterally, nearly as far to each side as the shrouds. This enables the vessel to reach and run. The instability caused by allowing such a weighty spar to extend too far away from the vessel's centreline, however, had to be borne in mind when designing hull and rigging. The peak of the sail is permanently attached to the head of the sprit, which is steadied by two sets of vangs.

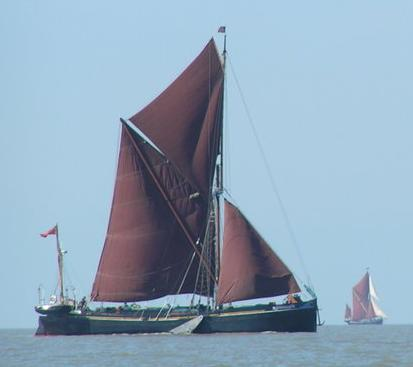
Thames sailing barges. The barge in the distance has all sail set, mainsail (the spritsail), topsail, foresail, topmast staysail and mizzen.

The spritsail rig was normally used without a boom. (The latter was usually found on fore-and-aft rigged vessels to keep the mainsail in an aerodynamically efficient shape.) Such loose-footed sails can also be found on gaff-rigged Norfolk wherries and the bawley class of vessel. The spritsail was a feature of the Cromster where the ability to furl the foot of the sail and raise the sheets, made gunnery much more readily possible. The sail could still be controlled using the vangs.

In a commercial vessel, the rig has the advantage of allowing a high stack of deck cargo and freeing the cargo hatch of obstructions when loading and unloading. The entire sail can be quickly brailed to the mast. The overriding advantage is safety in open water. Barges are unballasted and, if overpressed, will heel excessively and must be pulled to wind. The sheet will be eased and the aft end of a boom could drag in the water making the rudder ineffective and a capsize inevitable. The sheet of loose footed boomless barge is just released and control is regained. The boom does not project outboard so that the vessel can pass through a narrow gap between moored vessels. Loose footed sails suffer from sail twist which reduces their aerodynamic efficiency when sailing off the wind, which usually is not a commercial issue. It can be an advantage in light air. The vangs control the head of the sail which can be set so as to make use of the air above the wind-shadow of moored ships, warehouses and so on.

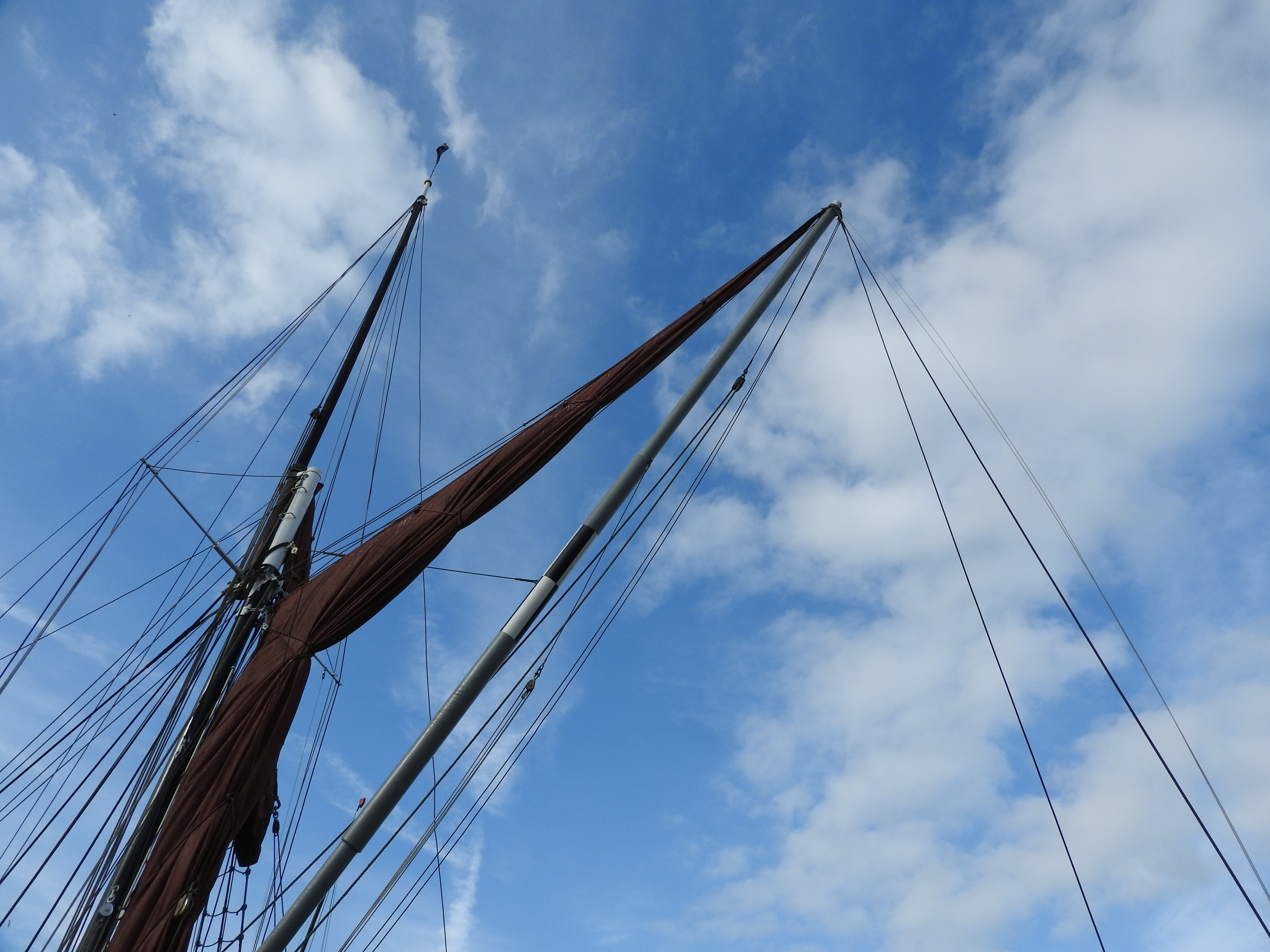
Mainsail fully brailed and stowed on SB Xylonite. The head of the diagonal sprit is steadied by the vangs.

This fine control of the sail without need for the crew to leave the deck, is achieved by brailing up. Rather than lowering the mainsail, it is gathered up against its own luff and head by means of lines called brails. This technique is an effective way of stowing the mainsail and gives fine control over the power obtained from the sail. In narrow channels, and in the lee of tall buildings the mainsail and mizzen are brailed and the bowsprit topped up, and she sails on topsail and foresail alone. A gaff rig was far more suitable for heavy weather and long sea passages, but when a gaff rigged vessel drops the mainsail, the topsail cannot be used. The gaff, attached to the mainsail, is required aloft to set the topsail.

However, the sprit rig means that the sail is stowed aloft and unreachable from the deck. It also means that the sail cannot easily be covered when it is stowed, and thus protected from the elements. But in any case, the crews of working vessels did not trouble with such dainty ways. In keeping with the general philosophy of working boats, all sails would therefore be traditionally treated with red oxide and other substances.

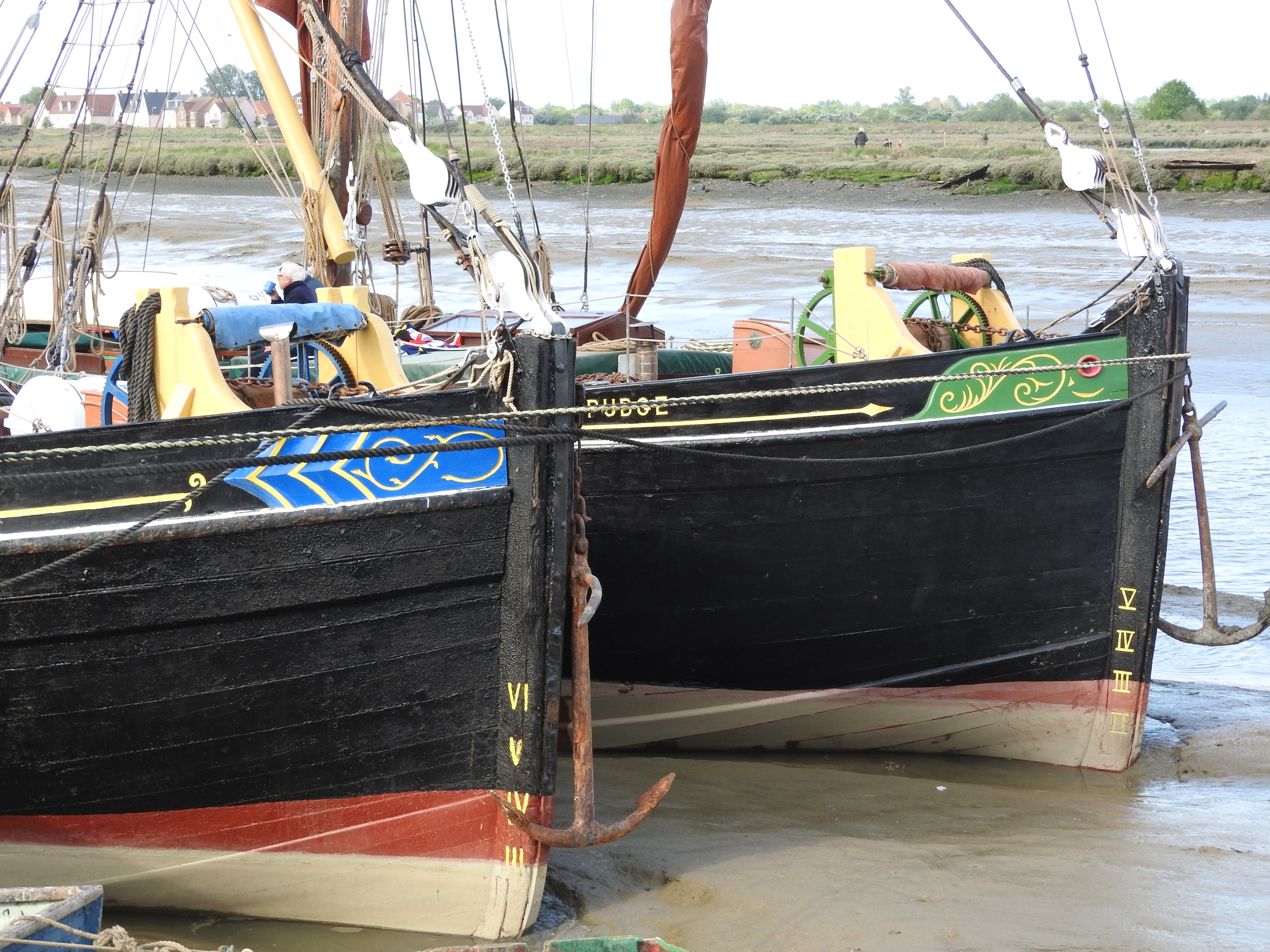
Foot of the forestay and windlasses on SB Pudge and SB Centaur

The problem of the inaccessibility of gear was met in the Thames barge by stepping the mast in a tabernacle and using a windlass on the foredeck to strike the whole lot, mast, sprit, sails and rigging. The crew could sail under a low bridge such as at Aylesford or Rochester without losing steerage way. The windlass is below the tack of the foresail and the tackle at the foot of the forestay. In striking the gear, the foresail tack tackle had to be cast off. With the bridge cleared, the skipper and an extra man (the huffler) used the windlass to raise the mast.

== Dinghies ==
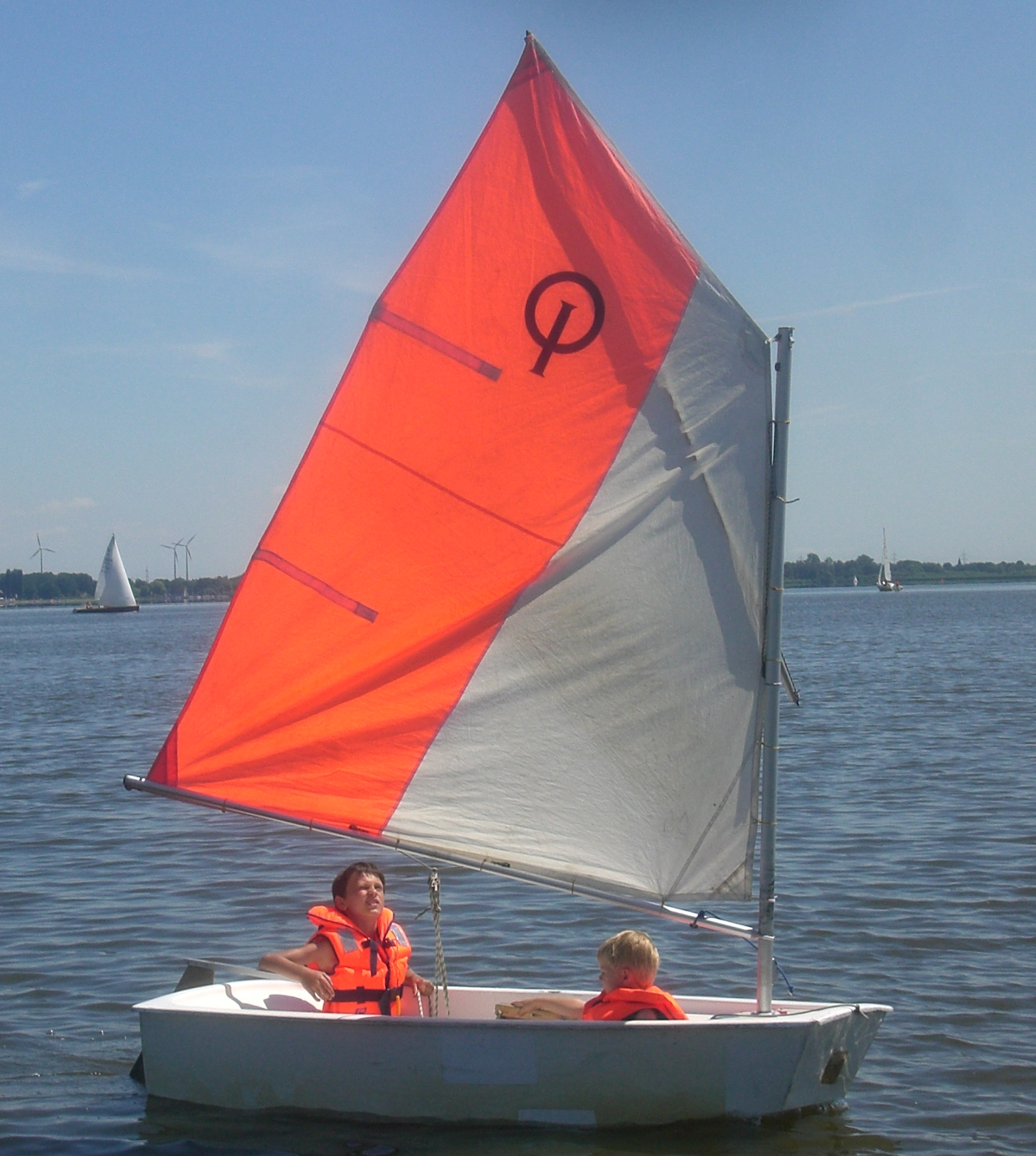
Leisure sailing on an Optimist

Modern use of the spritsail has also become more common through its use in the Optimist (dinghy)—this uses a boomed spritsail—in the case of which the sprit is tensioned by a snotter arrangement. This much simpler implementation sees the sprit anchored higher on the mast than on barges.

=== Leg of mutton spritsail ===
This is a sprit rig that uses a triangular sail, the luff is bent to the mast, and the one spar, the sprit-boom attaches to the clew of the sail. The fore end of the boom is tensioned (pulled tight to the mast) by use of a snotter chord. It is a precursor of the wishbone rig first popularised by windsurfers. On a Bolger 59 (square foot) rig, there is a 14'3" luff, 13'7" leech and 9'0" foot.

== Local boats ==
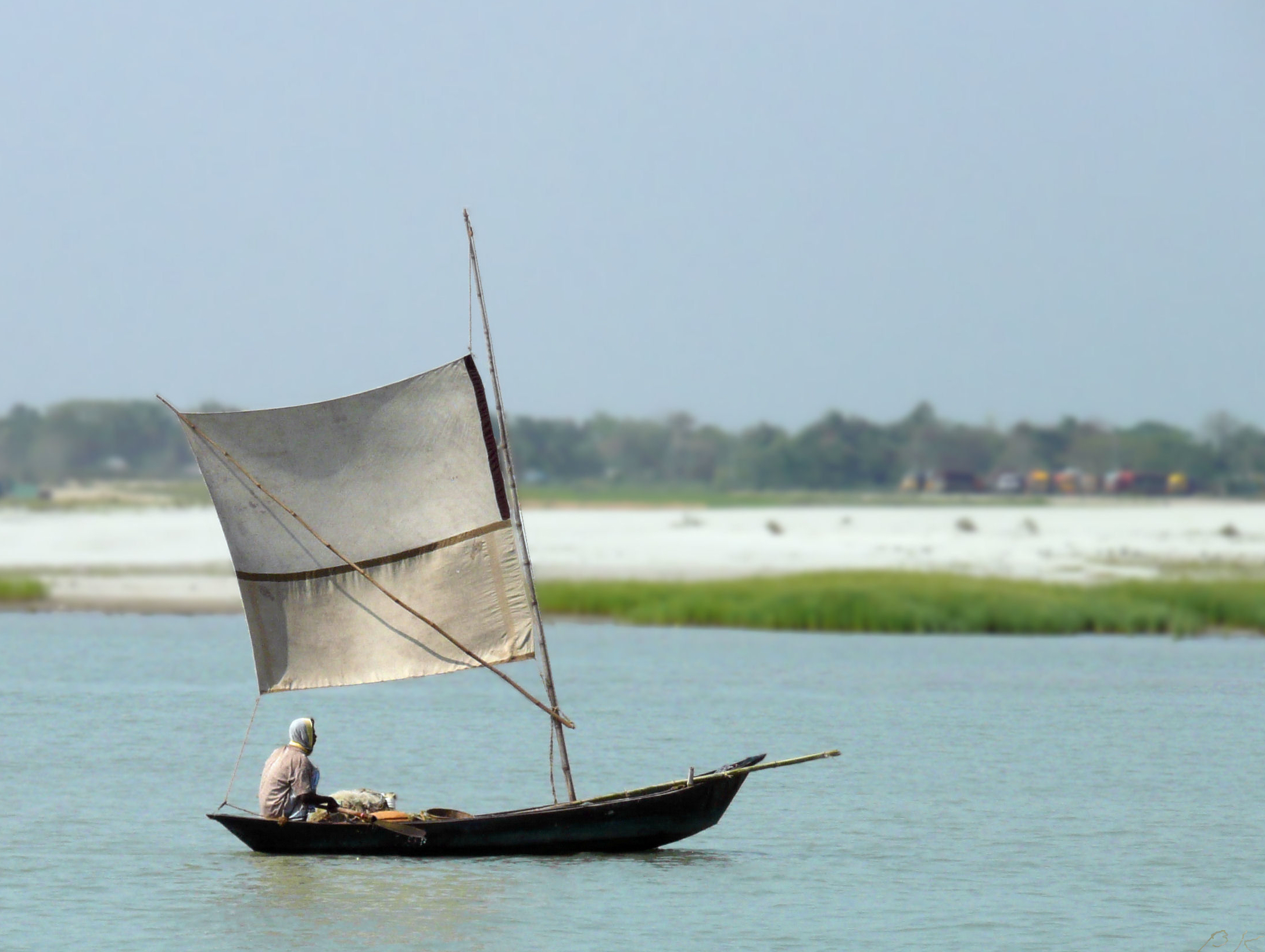
Boat on Padma River, Bangladesh

The spritsail is also commonly used in a fore-and-aft rig (along with a staysail) on local traditional wooden boats of the west coast of Norway, most notably the faering variant of the Oselvar. Traditionally, up until the second half of the 1800s, these boats used to be rigged with a square rig.

== See also ==
- Crab claw sail
- Oselvar
