= Justinus van Nassau =

Dutch army commander (1559–1631)

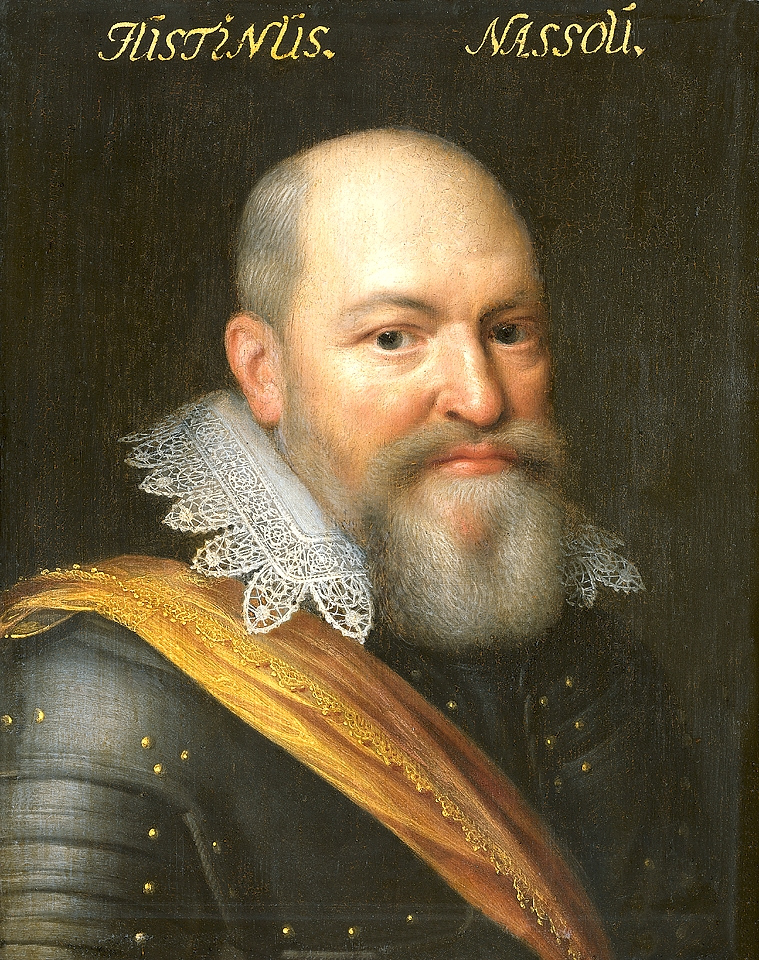
- Portrait of Justinus of Nassau by Jan Antonisz. van Ravesteyn
- Born: 1559
- Died: 1631 (aged 71–72); Leiden, Holland, Dutch Republic
- Resting place: Hooglandse Kerk, Leiden, Netherlands
- Spouse: Anna van Mérode
- Children: Willem Maurits van Nassau; Louise Henriëtte van Nassau; Philips van Nassau
- Parents: William the Silent; Eva Elincx

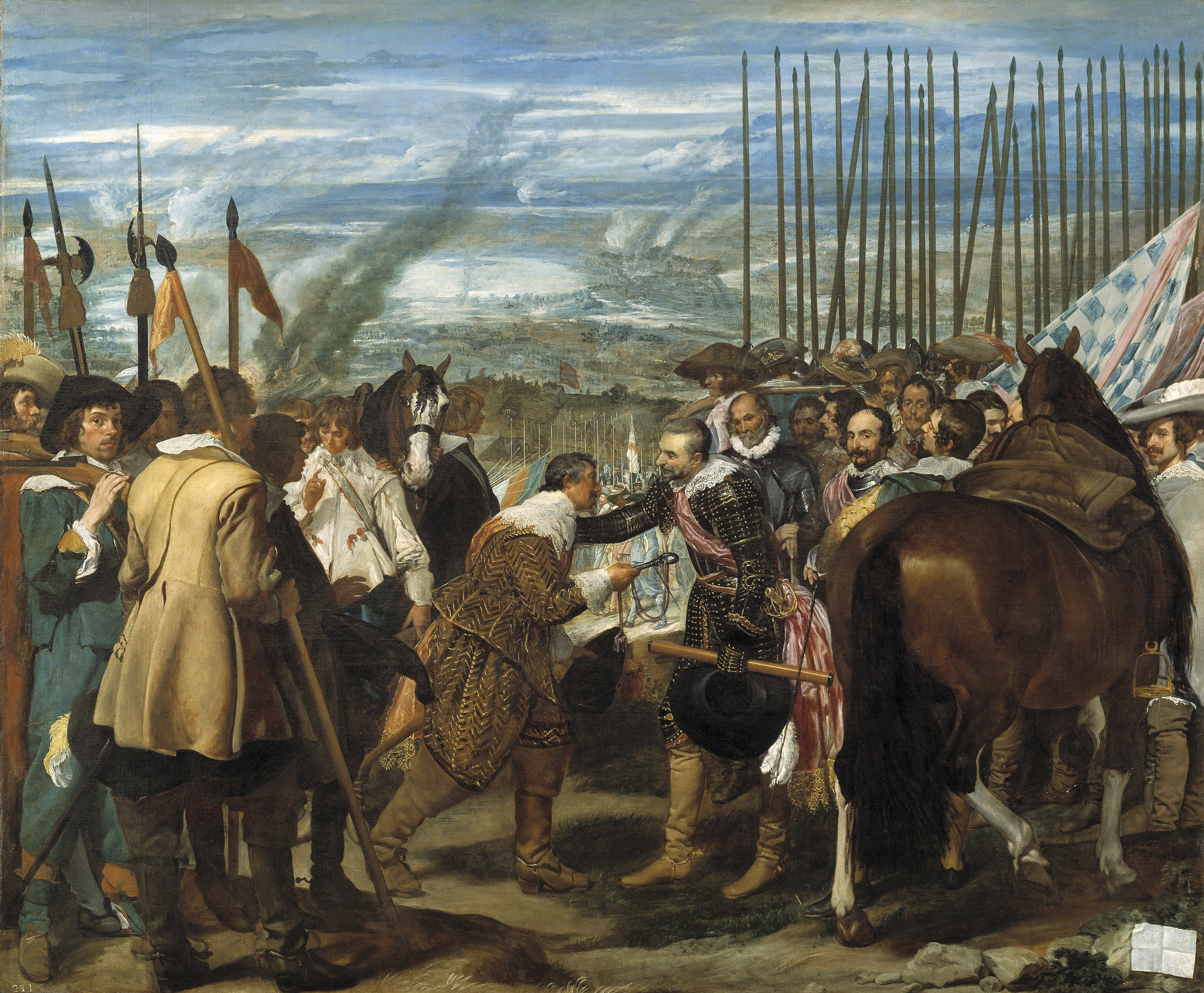
The Surrender of Breda by Diego Velázquez. Justinus of Nassau hands over the keys of the city to Ambrogio Spinola.

Justinus van Nassau (1559–1631) was the only extramarital child of William the Silent. He was a Dutch army commander known for his role in the defeat of the Spanish Armada, his leadership of the forces in Breda during the siege of 1624, and the depiction of his surrender in the painting by Diego Velázquez, The Surrender of Breda.

His mother was Eva Elincx, William's mistress between his first and second marriages. William of Orange recognized Justinus and raised him with his other children.

Justinus studied in Leiden and became Lieutenant-Colonel on 17 May 1583. On 28 February 1585 he became lieutenant-admiral of Zeeland, and fought in 1588 against the Spanish Armada, capturing two galleons.

From 1601 until 1625 he was governor of Breda. In 1625 he had to surrender Breda to the Spanish general Ambrogio Spinola after a siege of 11 months. Justinus was allowed to leave for Leiden.

== Issue ==
On 4 December 1597 he married Anne, Baronesse de Mérode (9 January 1567 – Leiden, 8 October 1634) and had three children.

- Willem Maurits van Nassau (June 1603 – d. 1638 in Leiden), married Maria van Aerssen van Sommelsdijk and had issue:
  - Justinus, no issue.
  - Justina van Nassau (March 1635 – c. 1676), married George van Cats ter Coulster (1632–1676) and had issue:
    - Willem Maurits van Cats, (c. 1670 – December 1743).
  - Anna van Nassau (c. 1638 – The Hague, 1721), married Willem Adriaan Count van Horn Batenburg and had issue.
- Louise Henriëtte van Nassau (1604 – between 1637 and 1645), no issue.
- Philips van Nassau (1605 – somewhere between 1672 and 1676), married and had issue.

He and his wife were buried in the Hooglandse Kerk in Leiden.

The following arms are recorded for Justinus, based on those of his father William the Silent.

Arms of Justinus van Nassau.

== Family tree ==
Family tree of the House of Nassau-Grimhuizen

William I "the Silent" (1533–1584), Prince of Orange 1544, Stadholder of Holland, Zealand & Utrecht	Eva Elincx
Justinus van Nassau (1559–1631); Admiral & General, Governor of Breda 1601–1625	Anne, Baronesse de Mérode (1567–1634)
William (1603–1638) jonker van Nassau, heer van Grimhuizen	Louise Henriëtte van Nassau (1604 – bet 1637/45) married Henry Philip Herbert lt. col. in Dutch Army, 1 son, Philips Henry Herbert (1634–1657)	Philips van Nassau (1605 – between 1672/1676) jonker van Nassau, heer van Grimhuizen, Hoekelom en Wijchen
Justinus II van Nassau (1633–1658); Jonker van Nassau heer van Grimhuizen	Justina van Nassau (1635–1721) married George van Cats (1632 – na 1676) heer van Cats, Coulster en Schagen	Anna Justina van Nassau (1638–1721) married Willem Adriaan II van Horne graaf van Horne, baron van Kessel en heer van Batenburg	Philips van Nassau died young	Anna Margaretha van Nassau (1634–1676) married (1) Diederik Schenk van Nydeggen heer van Blijenbeek, Afferden en Grubbenvorst married (2) Johan Gerard van Oostrum heer van Moersbergen, Cattenbroek en Zeist, col in Dutch Army, 2 daughters.
