= Snotter =

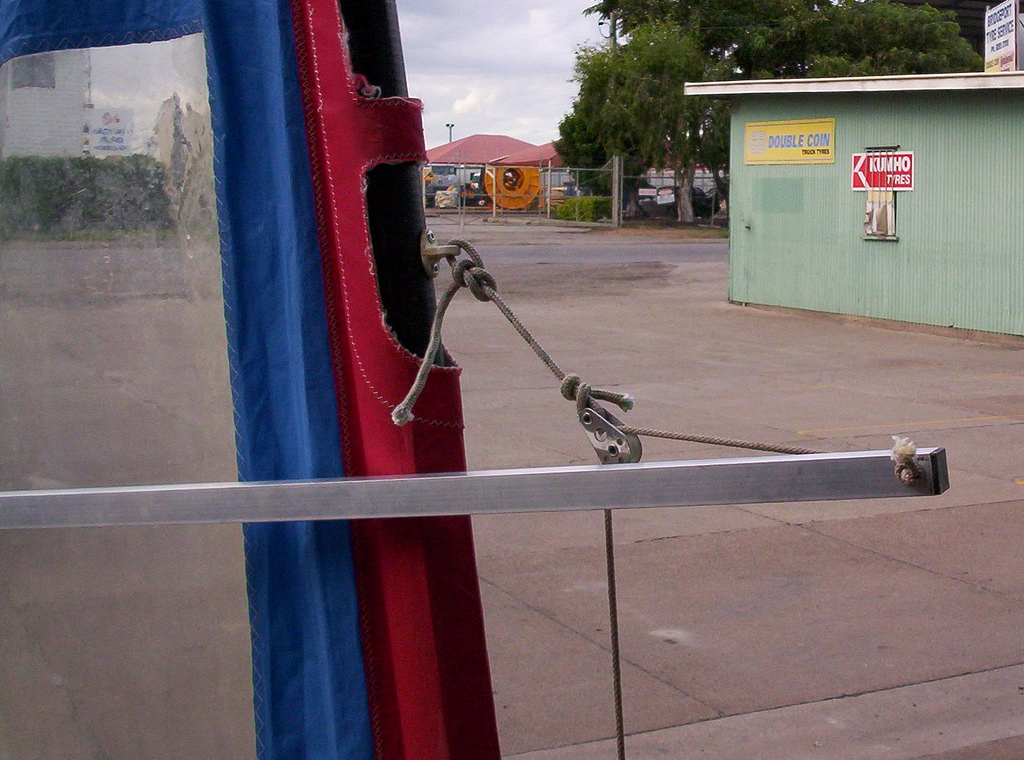
Snotter

A snotter is a rope or tackle used in sailing to tension the sprit on a spritsail, or a sprit boom on a sprit-boomed sail by pulling the lower end towards the mast. It is also used in a junk rig.

There are a great many variations on the snotter arrangement, and some more fastidious authors have referred to it as a snouter or snorter.

The origin of the nautical term is obscure. Hauling on the snotter sets the tension in the spar and thus governs how the sail is set.

On very small boats, typically with a single boomless spritsail, the snotter is a rope with eyes spliced into it, and is merely hooked into the fore end of the sprit and then jammed up the mast to force the upper end of the sprit into a pocket in the sail.

== Spritsail ==
There are boomed spritsails, loose-footed spritsails and boomless spritsails.

== Sprit Booms ==
The most common sprit-boom is found on a sprit-boomed leg-of-mutton sail. Sprit booms have been combined with a leech spar called a club; they have been used on foresails, like the jib. Some sailors have used a sprit boom on the standing lug sail.
