= Crommesteven =

Type of small warship

The Crommesteven or cromsteven, often as crompster, cromster or crumster (from crom = bent, concave; steven = stem) was a type of small warship used by the Dutch Republic and later by the British fleets during the sixteenth and seventeenth centuries. It was designed for work inshore on the shoal Netherlands coast and was a ketch, spritsail rigged on the main, and lateen on the small mizzen.

As a class of vessel, it was represented in England by the hoy. When Queen Elizabeth I died in 1603, her navy was reported to consist of 31 great ships, including galleons and crompsters, though crommestevens were considerably smaller than galleons.

For its size, it was heavily armed and capable of influencing events ashore, in which respect it played a part in the Spanish Armada campaign of 1588.

== Bibliography ==
- Marquardt, Karl Heinz (1992). "The Fore and Aft Rigged Ship". In Gardiner, Robert (ed.). The Line of Battle: The Sailing Warship 1650–1840. Conway's History of the Ship. Conway Maritime Press. pp. 63–84. ISBN 0-85177-954-9.
