= The Reconciliation of Esau and Jacob =

1624 painting by Peter Paul Rubens

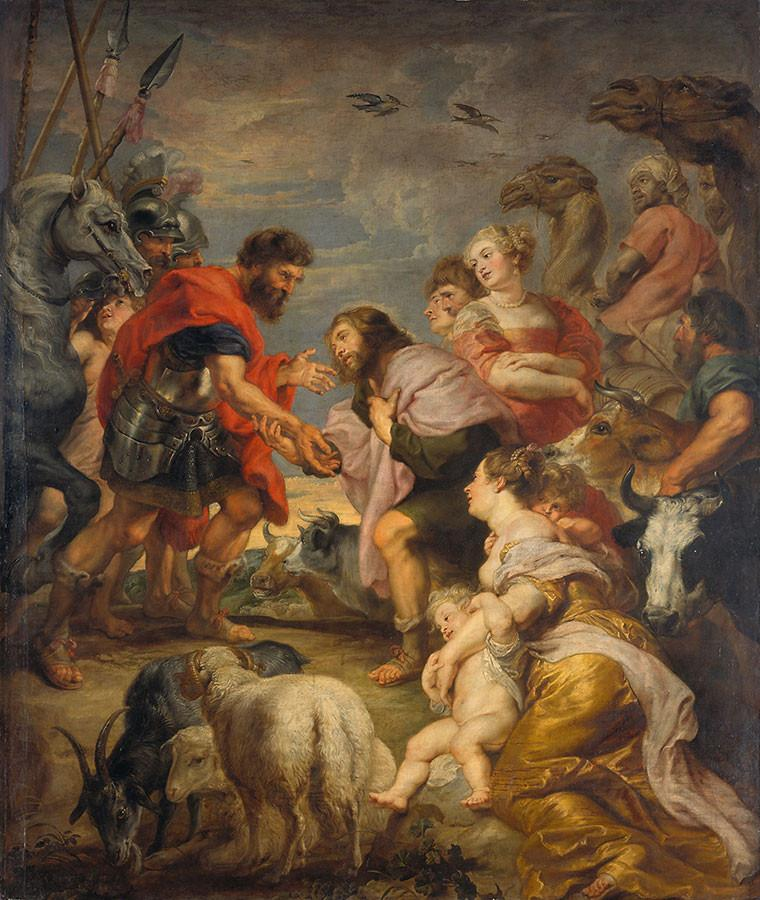
The Reconciliation of Esau and Jacob (1624) by Rubens

The Reconciliation of Esau and Jacob is a 1624 painting by Peter Paul Rubens. Originally in the Spanish royal collection, it was sent to Germany by Maria Anna of Neuburg (wife of Charles II of Spain) to her brother Johann Wilhelm. It is now in the Staatsgalerie Schleissheim near Munich.

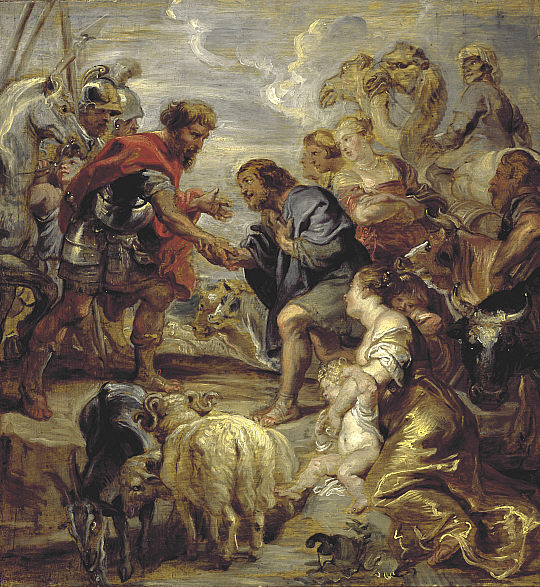
Study for the painting (National Gallery of Scotland)

== History ==
It shows the biblical story of meeting between Jacob and Esau. It was the model for a painting by Abraham Willemsen.

This painting was featured in Willem van Haecht's Gallery of Cornelis van der Geest with Joseph and Potiphar's wife, 1630s.

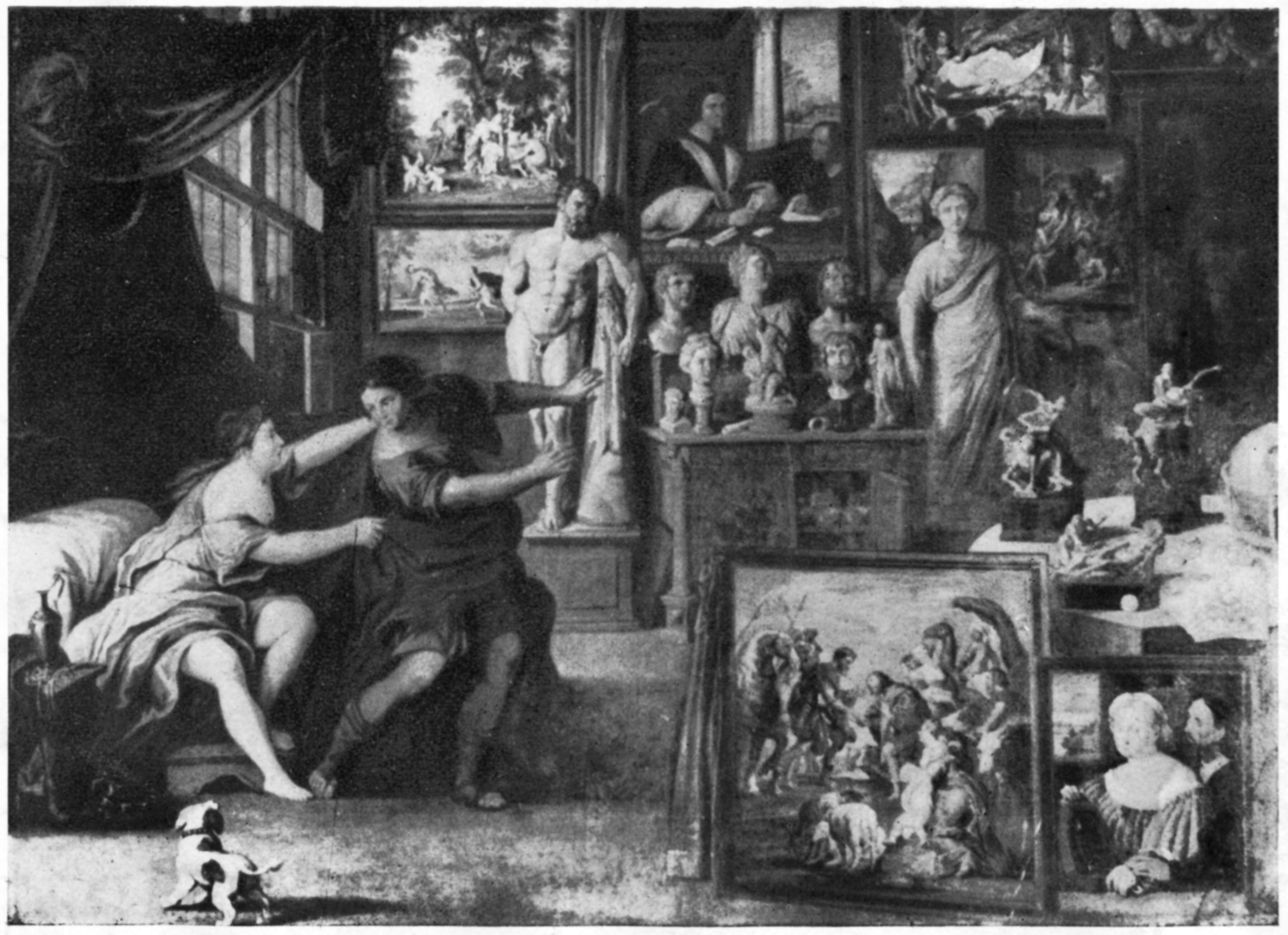
Gallery of Cornelis van der Geest with Joseph and Potiphar's wife, whereabouts unknown
