= Thames Sailing Barge Match =

The Thames Sailing Barge Match is the second oldest sailing race in the world, beaten only by the America's Cup. It starts off Stanford-le-Hope and finishes off the Three Daws public house in Gravesend on the London River (River Thames) and is open to spritsail rigged Thames sailing barges, it uses the same course and rules as were used in the first match in 1863.

== The first matches ==
The swim-headed barge ( the swimmie) was convenient for river work, slow to windward, fast off the wind but performing abysmally in heavy weather in the seaway. In the 1840s the swim head gave way to the rounded bow that was soon replaced by a straight stem (the stemmie). Competition from the railways was causing barge builders to experiment.

"The Golden Dustman", William Henry Dodd, organised the first race in 1863, giving cash prizes for the first barges in the stumpie and topsail classes. The second race in 1864 attracted 40 barges. Of the 16 stumpies and the 22 topsail barges entering in 1865, six were still in service in 1931. They sailed from Erith to The Nore and back in 5hr 47min and 5hr 14min. The Stumpies commonly raced at this time with a bowsprit. The owner of the leading 1867 stumpies, Lee, painted Invicta, the white horse of Kent on his black mainsails

The races were to induce the barge owners to improve the standard of equipment, and raise the status of the crews.

The public chartered special steamers to watch matches, and soon after, barge owners were commissioning barges with racing lines.

== Thames Barge Match 22 August 2015 ==
Started from Mucking No. 3 buoy, Lower Hope Reach, River Thames heading to South West Barrow buoy, returning to the finish off Gravesend. The course sailed was shortened to Sea Reach No.3 North Buoy as the outer mark

=== Results ===
Coasting Class
1st: Lady of the Lea
2nd: Lady Daphne (corrected time due to time penalty for crossing the start line early)
3rd: Cambria
4th: Centaur

Champion Staysail Class
1st: Niagara (by 2 seconds!)
2nd: Reminder
3rd: Edith May
4th: Repertor

Champion Bowsprit Class

1st: Adieu
2nd: Marjorie

Additional awards
Master making Fastest Start : Iolo Brooks, Adieu
Master of the Fastest Barge to the Mark: Richard Titchener, Reminder
Master of the Fastest Barge over the Course: Iolo Brooks, Adieu
Master of the First Barge Home: Robert Deards, Niagara
Master exhibiting the Best Seamanship during the Match: Geoff Gransden, Edith May
Master exhibiting the Best Seamanship in rounding the Mark: Robert Deards, Niagara
Best Performing Mainsheetman: Ray Payne, Reminder
Most valued Crewmember: Steve Burgess, Marjorie
For Achievement of a Young Crewmember (under 16): twins Jack and Peter Devonshire, Marjorie

== Other matches ==
There are nine barge matches a year, and for example in 2018 :

- Medway 9 June 2018 based at Queenborough
- Pin Mill 23 June 2018
- Blackwater 7 July 2018
- Thames 21 July 2018
- Swale 4 August 2018
- Southend Barge Match for 2018 has been cancelled
- Colne 15 September 2018

== Sources ==
- Carr, Frank (1951). Sailing Barges (Revised ed.). Peter Davies Ltd.
- March, Edgar J (1948). Spritsail barges of the Thames and Medway. London: Percival Marshall.
