= Bradfield, Essex =

Village and Parish in Essex, England

Coordinates: 51.9345°N 1.1249°E

Bradfield
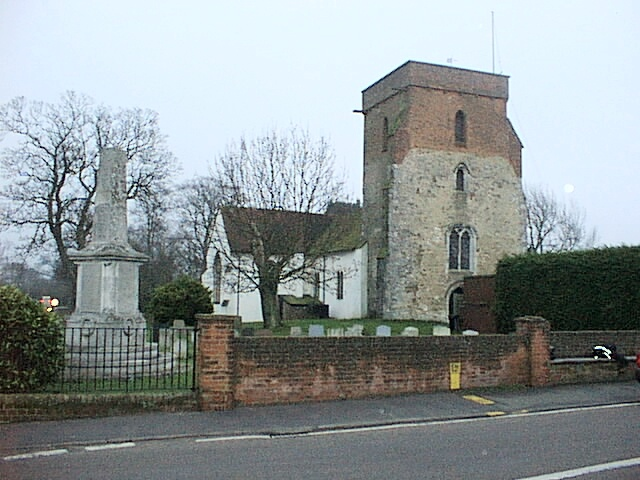
- Bradfield Church

- Location within Essex
- Population: 1,253 (Parish, 2021)
- OS grid reference: TM144308
- District: Tendring
- Shire county: Essex
- Region: East
- Country: England
- Sovereign state: United Kingdom
- Post town: Manningtree
- Postcode district: CO11
- Dialling code: 01206; 01255
- Police: Essex
- Fire: Essex
- Ambulance: East of England
- UK Parliament: Harwich and North Essex

Bradfield is a village and civil parish near Manningtree in Essex, England. It is located about 9 miles (14 km) west of Harwich in the north-east of Essex on the River Stour. It is on the B1352 road between Manningtree and Harwich, a former coaching route. Within the parish, Bradfield and the hamlet of Bradfield Heath form a "complex and substantial linear settlement", as described by Tendring District Council in 2006. At the 2021 census the parish had a population of 1,253.

== History ==
There are signs of people living in the parish area since the Neolithic era. A polished Neolithic stone axe head was found on Bradfield Heath in 1955, while other tools were found by local archaeologist Samuel Hazzledine Warren. Finds dating from the Bronze Age include a macehead, crop marks and ring ditches that suggest occupation. Although no Roman settlement has been found, occupation in the area has been evidenced by a beehive quern-stone, and pieces of Roman brick and tile within the fabric of St. Lawrence's church.

The village is of Anglo-Saxon origin, and was in the ownership of Aluric Camp (alternatively spelt Aelfric Kemp) at time of the Norman Conquest in 1066. The village at that time was called Bradefelda, which was Old English for "Broad Stretch of Open Land", but has alternatively been named Bradefeld, Bradefeld by Manytre, Bradefeud and Bradeford. There was a further hamlet called Manestuna (later called Maneston which means hamlet), the site of modern-day Jacques Hall, which was held by Alfelmus before the conquest. By the time of the Domesday Book of 1086, the village had transferred to two owners, Roger of Raismes and Roger of Poitou, via the manors of Bradfield and Manestuna, and had 22 households, putting it within the largest 40% of settlements recorded. The village may have been closer to the manor at Nether Hall or the church and have been dispersed in nature.

The oldest building in the village is the tower of St. Lawrence's church: parts of this date from the 12th century. The misalignment of the tower with the nave leads experts to believe the tower was added to an earlier Anglo-Saxon church on the site. In 1312, Bradfield Hall manor passed to William Franke, who in 1320 received a Royal Charter to hold a market in the village, but by 1848 the market was no longer operational. The hall passed to the Raynsford family by marriage in 1397, and in 1482 Sir John Raynsford was born there. The Hall was rebuilt by the Raynsfords in 1500 and was visited by Henry VIII in 1548, but by 1568 the Hall had come under the ownership of the Grimston family. Sir Harbottle Grimston, 1st Baronet was born at the Hall in 1569. Bradfield Heath, to the west of the church, was one of the heathlands that marked the northerly border of the medieval Royal Forest of Essex and this was still shown on Chapman and André's 1777 Map of Essex as being open land. During the 19th century, the heath had started to be enclosed, and houses were scattered around the former heathland, marking the start of the creation of the hamlet. However, in the late 18th century during after the declaration of war by Napoleonic France, a military camp was set up on the heath.

Mistley, Thorpe and Walton Railway Act 1863
- Act of Parliament
- Parliament of the United Kingdom
- Long title: An Act for making a Railway from the Great Eastern Railway at Mistley to Walton-on-the-Naze in the County of Essex; and for other Purposes.
- Citation: 26 & 27 Vict. c. clxxviii

Dates
- Royal assent: 21 July 1863

Text of statute as originally enacted

In 1854, Bradfield railway station opened on the Mayflower Line, with just two through platforms. It had no sidings for working local goods traffic, which was the normal scenario in rural East Anglia. Ten years later, there was an accident at Bradfield, in which the engine left the track and dragged the carriages down the embankment. A year earlier, in 1863, local businessman Robert Free of Mistley put forward plans to Parliament to build a new railway, the Mistley, Thorpe and Walton Railway, which would have gone though the parish at Bradfield. The project was authorised when the Mistley, Thorpe and Walton Railway Act 1863 (26 & 27 Vict. c. clxxviii), but had failed by 1869. The only remaining structure on the planned line is a bridge, on the Mistley/Bradfield parish boundary. The station itself closed in 1956.

The parish was part of Tendring Hundred, and from 1834, part of the Tendring poor law union. In 1808 it gained a Wesleyan Methodist chapel, while in 1840 it gained a Primitive Methodist chapel. By 1901, the village and the heath were connected by new properties built along The Street, and in 1919 Sir Harris Dunning of Jacques Hall had demolished the former Plough Inn pub to build the village's war memorial. In 1955, the Bradfield Hall built by the Raynsford family was demolished. Until recently, the parish was served by two pubs; however in January 2025 the Stranglers Home closed, while in May 2025, the parish's other pub, The Village Maid, was put up for sale.

== Geology ==
The bedrock geology in the area has been mapped by the British Geological Survey (BGS) as clays, silts and sands of the Thames Group, formed in estuarine or marine environments during the Palaeogene period. The soil is similar to the fine loam of East Norfolk, but is much stiffer and harder to manage. The soil is acidic, and survival of bone is poor, but other archaeological material has been preserved, such as flint artefacts, ceramics, building materials and metal.

== Governance ==
=== Parliamentary seat ===
Bradfield comes under the Harwich and North Essex Parliamentary constituency, which Bernard Jenkin of the Conservative Party has held since its creation in 2010.

Prior to being in the Harwich and North Essex Parliamentary constituency, Bradfield parish sat within the following constituencies:

Constituency name	Years of operation	Reference
Essex	1290–1832	
North Essex	1832–1868	
East Essex	1868–1918	
Harwich	1918–1997	
North Essex	1997–2010	

=== Local government ===
Bradfield sits within the non-metropolitan county of Essex, governed by Essex County Council; and the non-Metropolitan district of Tendring, which is governed by Tendring District Council. The village was until 2024 in the Tendring district ward of Bradfield, Wrabness and Wix. However, in 2019, Bradfield became part of the new Stour Valley ward.

The lowest level of local government is provided by Bradfield parish council.

== Demographics ==
=== Population ===
The population of the parish has been recorded at official Census points as:

Census	Population	Source
2001	1,094	
2011	1,112	
2021	1,253	

=== Ethnicity ===
At the 2021 census, the parish population was recorded as having the following breakdown of ethnicity:

Ethnicity background	% of population - Bradfield	% of population - U.K.
Asian, Asian British or Asian Welsh	0.2	9.6
Black, Black British, Black Welsh, Caribbean or African	0.5	4.2
Mixed or Multiple ethnic groups	1.2	3.0
White	98.1	81.0
Other ethnic groups	0.0	2.2

=== Age Groups ===
The population of 1,253 at the 2021 census fell into the following age groups:

Age group	% of population	
Age group	Bradfield	Whole of UK (for comparison)
0-4	2.8	5.4
5-9	4.1	5.9
10-14	5.9	6.1
15-19	5.7	5.8
20-24	4.3	6.0
25-29	2.5	6.5
30-34	2.4	7.0
35-39	4.4	6.8
40-44	5.0	6.5
45-49	7.0	6.1
50-54	6.5	6.8
55-59	8.8	6.7
60-64	8.0	5.9
65-69	7.6	4.9
70-74	9.0	4.7
75-79	7.3	4.0
80-84	3.8	2.5
85 and over	4.8	2.5

=== Economics and Education ===
The employment activity within the parish was recorded at the 2021 census as:

Employment status	% of population - Bradfield	% of population - U.K.
Employed	50.4	57.4
Unemployed	2.8	3.5
Economically inactive	46.8	39.1

In the 2021 census it was recorded that the working population in the parish completed the following hours per week:

Hours per week	% of population - Bradfield	% of population - U.K.
Part-time - 15 hours or less worked	14.1	10.3
Part-time - 16 to 30 hours worked	20.5	19.5
Full-time - 31 to 48 hours worked	53.1	59.1
Full-time - 49 or more hours worked	12.4	11.1

For those who did work, the breakdown at the 2021 census of the distance people travelled to work or worked from home was:

Distance travelled to work	% of population - Bradfield	% of population - U.K.
Works mainly from home	34.6	31.5
Less than 10 km	14.8	35.4
10 km to less than 30 km	26.1	14.4
30 km and over	7.6	4.3
Other	17.0	14.5

At the 2021 census, those of the parish population over the age of 16 had the following qualifications:

Level of qualifications	% of population - Bradfield	% of population - U.K.
No qualifications	18.2	18.1
Level 1, 2 or 3 qualifications	43.0	39.9
Apprenticeship	6.5	5.3
Level 4 qualifications and above	29.5	33.9
Other qualifications	2.8	2.8

== Economy ==
Bradfield had been primarily an agricultural economy. In the census of 1801, it was shown that of the 582 inhabitants of the parish, 474 of them were involved in agriculture with only 80 people recorded as working in manufacturing or handicraft. The parish was once home to two windmills, while there was a steam mill at Bradwell Hall. Agricultural trade was moved by wharf set up on the River Stour, while evidence of a decoy at Jacques Hall indicates that there was also wild fowling in the parish. Since 2006, the parish has been grouped together with Manningtree, Wix and Mistley as part of Tendring District Council's Employment studies. The 2006 study showed that the largest employment sectors within the area were Health & Social Care and Transport and Communications. The parish is served by a post office which includes a convenience store.

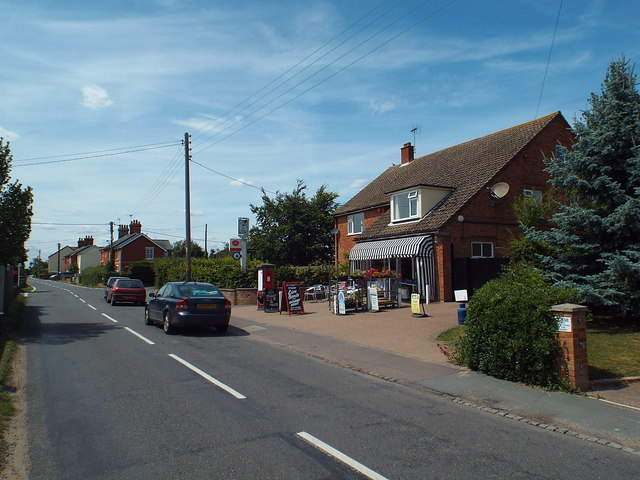
The Post Office and store

== Services ==
=== Education ===
The village has a primary school, Bradfield Primary School in Heath Road.

=== Health ===
The village does not have a doctors surgery and its nearest hospital with an emergency department is Colchester Hospital, while other services are offered at Fryatt Memorial Hospital in Harwich.

=== Police & Fire Brigade ===
Essex Police is the local constabulary, with the parish coming under the Harwich and Manningtree neighbourhood team, with the nearest stations at Clacton-on-Sea or Colchester. The nearest fire station is at Manningtree and is an on-call service provided by Essex County Fire and Rescue Service.

=== Recreation ===
The parish has a recreation ground and allotments run by a charity, while there is also a Village Hall.

== Buildings and structures ==
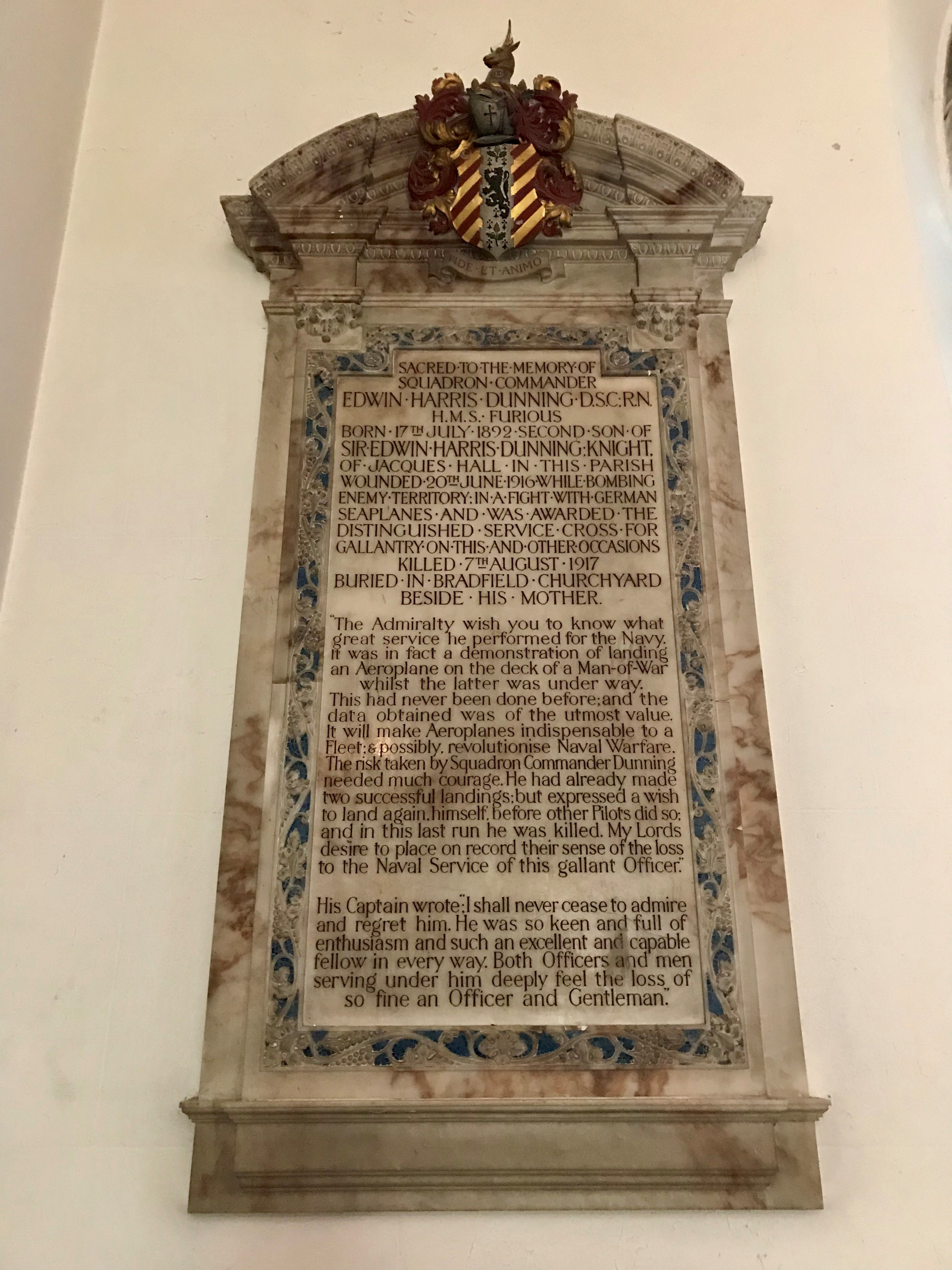
Dunning memorial plaque at St. Lawrence church in Bradfield, Essex

Bradfield parish has seventeen buildings and structures that are listed on the National Heritage List for England. An area around St. Lawrence church is a local designated conservation area.

St. Lawrence Church is the oldest building the parish. The building is grade II listed with the earliest parts of the structure dating from the 12th century. Within the building, one of the windows commemorates Edwin Harris Dunning, the first pilot to land an aircraft on a moving ship, while there is a further memorial within the north transept. His grave lies in the churchyard, next to his parents. The church also has a monument in the chantry to the Agassiz family, while there are tablets in memorial to members of both the Grimston and Unfreville families.

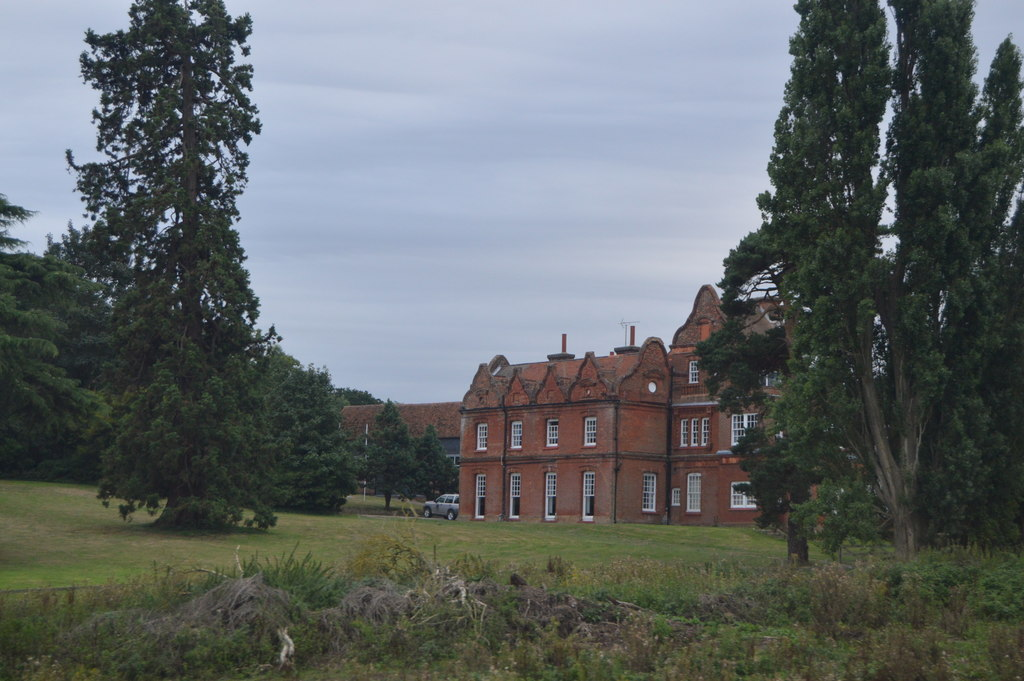
Jacques Hall

Jacques Hall is a 19th-century house, rebuilt on the site of a previous hall in red brick with Dutch Gables. The property was converted to a special school in 1988 but closed down in 2011. In 2014, planning permission was refused to turn Jacques Hall into a house of multiple occupancy by Tendring District Council.

=== Listed buildings and structures ===
Title	List entry number	Date first listed	Grade listing	Description	National grid reference	Reference
Acacia House	1253957	18 May 1979	II	17th century, possibly earlier, timber framed and plastered house	TM 14386 30838	
Church of St Lawrence	1261530	17 November 1966	II	Church with 12th, 14th, 15th and 16th century construction that was renovated during the 19th century	TM 14444 30785	
Crinkle Crankle Wall, 40m South of St Lawrence Church	1254074	30 November 1987	II	18th century wall that was formerly part of a walled garden	TM 14442 30728	
Elderberry Cottages	1254093	5 January 1979	II	Pair of 18th or 19th century Red brick cottages	TM 14407 30728	
Hope Cottages	1261482	30 November 1987	II	Pair of 18th/19th century timber framed brick faced cottages	TM 14181 30087	
House 150yrds South of Mill Lane Adjacent to Mill Cottage	1261481	30 November 1987	II	18th century timber framed and brick faced house	TM 14357 30481	
K6 Telephone Kiosk	1240632	14 November 1991	II	A K6 telephone box	TM 14392 30778	
Lavender Cottage	1254095	30 November 1987	II	17th or 18th century timber framed and plastered cottage	TM 13568 29796	
Maltings Cottage	1254094	30 November 1987	II	18th or 19th century Red brick cottage	TM 14351 30480	
Milepost on North Eastern Verge	1253955	30 November 1987	II	19th century cast iron mile post covering an 18th-century milestone	TM 14394 30815	
Mill House	1261529	30 November 1987	II	18th century, although possibly earlier red brick house	TM 14086 30644	
Milestone Cottage	1253956	7 November 1979	II	17th century, possibly earlier, timber framed and plastered cottage	TM 14402 30822	
Nether Hall	1253953	30 November 1987	II	18th century, though possibly earlier, Gault Brick hall	TM 13973 31611	
Squires Cottage	1253958	30 November 1987	II	18th/19th century timber framed and weatherboarded cottage	TM 14406 30775	
The Brambles	1254112	30 November 1987	II	17th/18th century timber framed and rough rendered	TM 14250 30163	
Walkers	1254096	30 November 1987	II	17th or 18th century, though possibly earlier, timber framed and plastered cottage	TM 14089 30063	
Willow Way	1253954	10 October 1980	II	17th century timber framed plastered cottage	TM 14206 29768	

== Notable people ==
- Sir John Raynsford (1482 – 1559), politician, MP for Colchester and High Sheriff of Essex and Hertfordshire for 1537–38.
- Sir Harbottle Grimston, 1st Baronet (c. 1569 – 1648), politician, MP for Harwich, Knight of the shire for Essex and High Sheriff of Essex.
- Sir Harbottle Grimston, 2nd Baronet (1603–1685), politician, Speaker of the House in 1660.
- Squadron Commander Edwin Harris Dunning (1892–1917), first pilot to land an aircraft on a moving ship. Lived at Jacques Hall prior to joining the navy. Buried at St. Lawrence church with his mother.
