= John Hody =

Member of the Parliament of England

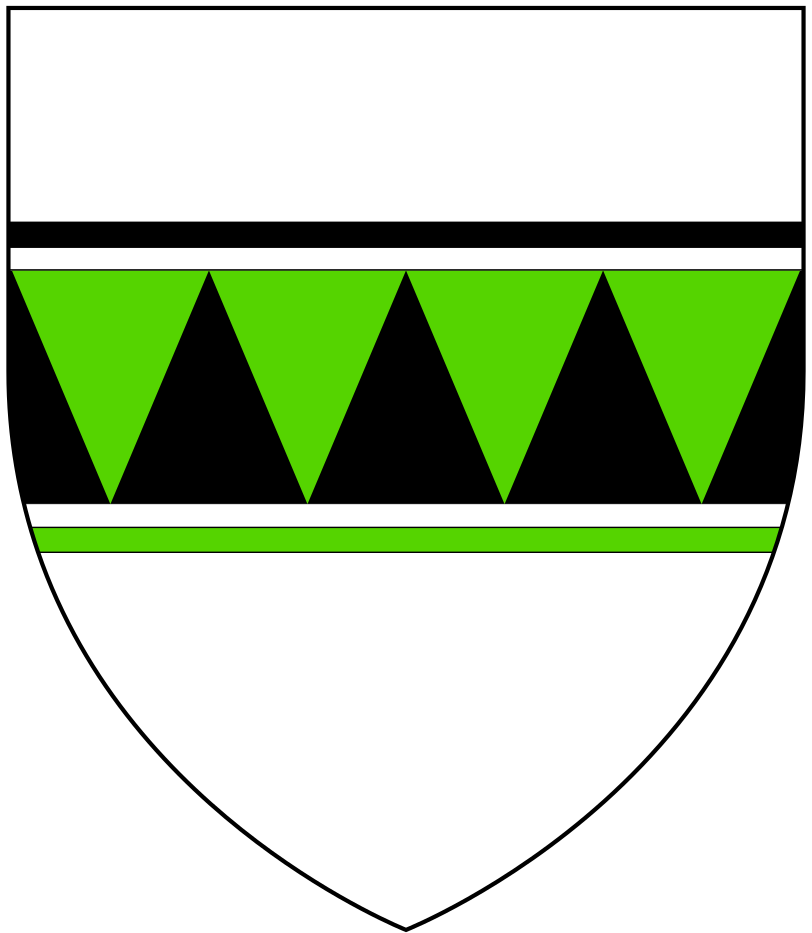
Arms of Hody (alias Huddy, Huddie, etc.) of Stowell, Somerset: Argent, a fess per fess indented vert and sable between two cotises counterchanged of the fess

Sir John Hody (died 24 december 1441) of Stowell in Somerset and of Pilsdon in Dorset, was Chief Justice of the King's Bench.

== Origins ==
He was the son of Thomas Hody (d. 1442), lord of the manor of Kington Magna in Dorset, Escheator of Dorset in 1419/20. John's mother was Margaret Cole, daughter and heiress of John Cole of Nitheway in the parish of Brixham in Devon, which thus became the birthplace of his children. John's elder brother was Alexander Hody (died 16 May 1461), a strong supporter of the House of Lancaster during the Wars of the Roses who was attainted in the first year of the reign of King Edward IV for his adherence to the deposed King Henry VI.

Hody was descended from a family of considerable antiquity, though of no great note, in Devon. Jordan de Hode held lands in Hode in the thirteenth century; Richard de Hody was the king's escheator of that county in 1353/54 and 1357/58, and the same office was filled by William Hody in 1400/01.

== Career ==
He was educated as a lawyer and is frequently mentioned in the Year Books from 1424/25. Although there is no record of his summons to take the degree of the coif, there is very little doubt that he was by 1435/36 a serjeant-at-law, as his name appears on the list of those called upon to contribute towards the equipment of the army against France in 1435/36. Certainly, he had attained that rank before July 1439.

He was elected a Member of Parliament for Shaftesbury in 1421 and again in 1422, 1423, 1425 and 1427. In 1431 he was elected as a Member of Parliament for the prestigious county seat Dorset and in 1433, 1435 and 1437 for the county seat of Somerset. Clearly he was held in high esteem by the House of Commons which during his last tenure selected him to notify the House of Lords of the election of a new Speaker of the House of Commons in the place of John Tyrell, who was incapacitated by infirmity.

On the death of Sir John Juyn in 1440 he was appointed Chief Justice of the King's Bench, by patent dated 13 April 1440, which office he held for almost two years, his successor, Sir John Fortescue, being appointed on 25 January 1442. His judicial career was probably terminated by his death, as his will is dated 17 December 1441, although the date of its probate is not recorded.

== Judicial reputation ==
Notwithstanding the short period during which he presided in the court, he is stated by Prince (d. 1723) to have won golden opinions by his integrity and firmness in the administration of justice. Sir Edward Coke mentions him amongst the "famous and expert sages of the law" from the decisions of whom Lyttelton had "great furtherance in composing his Institutes of the Laws of England."

== Marriage and children ==
He married Elizabeth Jewe (d. 1473), daughter and heiress of John Jewel (d. 1415/16) of Whitfield in the parish of Wiveliscombe in Somerset, by his wife Alice de Pillesden, daughter and heiress of John de Pillesden, of Pilsdon in Somerset. Elizabeth survived her husband and remarried to Robert Capps, Sheriff of Somerset and Sheriff of Dorset in 1445/46. By his wife he had five sons and several daughters, including:

- John Hody, eldest son and heir, seated at Stowell and Nitheway, where his posterity remained for many generations.
- William Hody (pre-1441 – died 1524), 2nd son, Attorney General for England and Wales and Chief Baron of the Exchequer under King Henry VII. He founded his own branch of the Hody family seated at Pilsdon until the 18th century.
- Joan Hody, wife of Sir Nicholas Latimer (d. 1505) of Duntish in the parish of Buckland Newton, Dorset, son and heir of John Latimer and heir male of the body of William Latimer, 4th Baron Latimer (1330–1381). Without male children. A heraldic shield representing this marriage survives in Fonthill Abbey, Wiltshire, showing the arms of Latimer impaling Hody (Argent, a fess per fess indented or and sable between two double copies of the last).

== Landholdings ==
His early success as an apprentice-at-law brought him the means with which to purchase two parts of the manor of Wydecombe in the 1420s and the whole of the manor of Stowell in Somerset, purchased in 1427 from Reynold Molyns, son of Reynold Molyns (d. 1385). In 1435 he purchased the manor of Wootton Glanville and in 1439 Long Critchell in Dorset. He was seated at his own estate at Stowell and after his marriage also at Pilsdon in Dorset, which came to him, together with the manor of Whitfield in the parish of Wiveliscombe, in Somerset, and other property in both counties, by his marriage to the heiress Elizabeth Jewe.

== Death and burial ==
He died before New Year's Day in 1441/42. His will dated 17 December 1441, by which it appears that his father survived him, directs his body to be buried in the Church of St Mary, Woolavington, in Somerset, near the body of "Magister Johannes Hody", his uncle. By a large amount of silver plate and other articles which he gave in legacies, some idea may be formed of the domestic economy of a Chief Justice of England at this period. He made a bequest to the chantry priests of Woolavington Church "for the love that he had to hit for their he began his first learning".

In about 1880 during restoration work, a square stone was discovered on the floor of the church beneath the tower, on which is sculpted the monogram "JH". This is believed to be connected to Hody's former monument as the vault in which he and his uncle are believed to have been buried lies under the tower and west end of the church.
