= William Hody =

Member of the Parliament of England

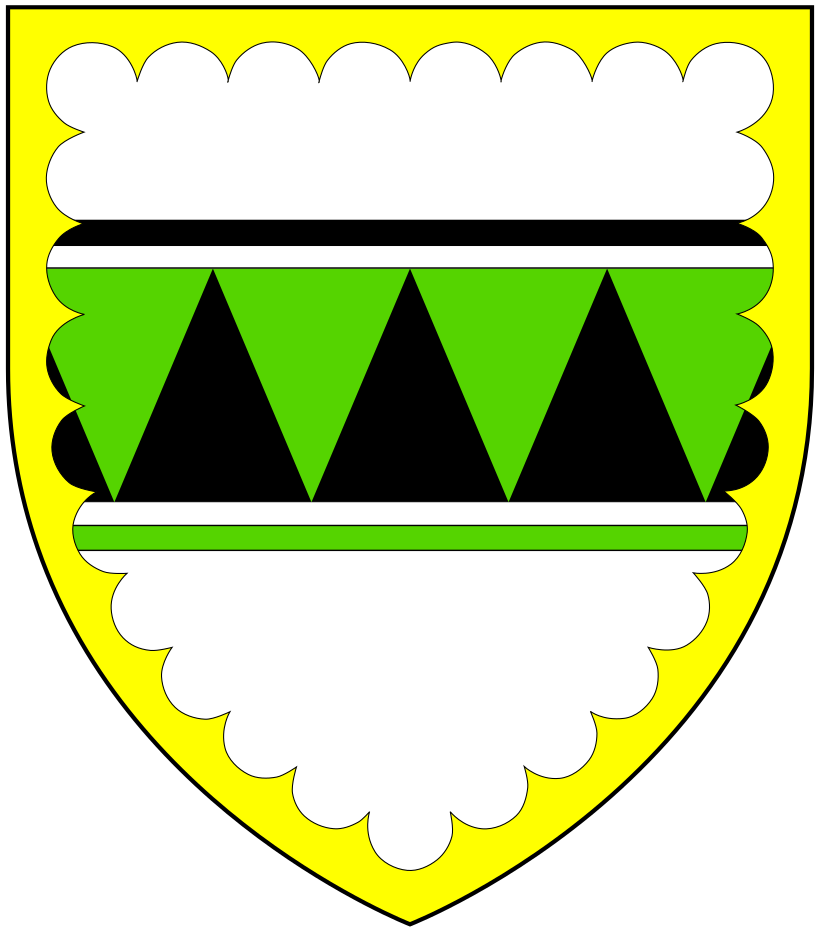
Arms of Hody of Pilsdon: Argent, a fess per fess indented vert and sable between two cotises counterchanged of the fess a bordure engrailed (or?), as seen on the monumental brass in Haccombe Church, Devon, of his granddaughter Mary Hody (d.1589), wife of Thomas Carew (d.1586) of Haccombe

Sir William Hody (born before 1441, died 1524) of Pilsdon in Dorset, was an English lawyer, judge and politician who served as Attorney General for England and Wales and Chief Baron of the Exchequer under King Henry VII.

== Origins ==
He was born before 1441, the second son of Sir John Hody (d. 1441), Chief Justice of the King's Bench. His sister, Elisabeth Hody, married Sir Robert Strode of Parnham House, Dorset which they re-built from 1522.

== Career ==
He was a Member of Parliament for Totnes in 1472, and for Bridgwater in 1483. His name is first mentioned in the year-books in 1476. He procured a reversal of the attainder of his uncle, Sir Alexander Hody (of Bowre, Somerset), who had been attainted at Edward IV's accession for adherence to the House of Lancaster during the wars of the Roses.

In 1485, shortly after the accession of King Henry VII, Hody became Attorney General for England and Wales. On 29 October 1486 he was appointed Chief Baron of the Exchequer. He retired as a judge in 1522.

== Marriage and children ==
William Hody married (1st) Eleanor Malet, daughter of Sir Baldwin Malet of 'Corypool' (now Curry Mallet) in Somerset, Solicitor General to King Henry VIII, who was the second son of Thomas Malet (died 1502) by his wife Joan Wadham, daughter of Sir William Wadham. By his wife he had two sons and two daughters:

- Reignold Hody, eldest son;
- William Hody of Pilsdon, 2nd son, who married twice: (1st) to Margery Keyne, daughter and heiress of Anthony Keyne, of Kent, by whom he had three sons: Richard, John and William; He married (2nd) Anne Strode, daughter of John Strode, of Chalmington, Dorset, by whom he had a daughter Mary Hody (d.19 November 1588), wife of Sir Thomas Carew (1518-1586) of Haccombe in Devon. The separate monumental brasses of Mary Hody and her husband survive in Haccombe Church. Mary's brass shows the arms of Carew impaling Hody and is inscribed in Latin as follows:

Hic jacet Maria Carew uxor Thomae Carew de Haccombe, Arm(igeri) & filia Will(elmi) Huddye de com(itatu) Dorset, Arm(igeri), quae obiit 19 die Nov(embris) A(nno) D(omini) 1588 ("Here lies Mary Carew, wife of Thomas Carew of Haccombe, Esquire, and a daughter of William Huddye from the county of Dorset, who died on the 19th day of November in the year of our Lord 158

- Joan Hody, wife of Sir Richard Warre (died 1601) of Hestercombe;
- Eme Hody, wife of Lawrence Wadham, a son of Nicholas Wadham of Merryfield, Ilton in Somerset and of Edge, Branscombe in Devon.

Other children not listed above:

- Agnes Hody (other variations include Huddye). second wife of Robert Cary. Issue: William Cary who married Joan Herle. Issue: William Cary of Ladford who married Jane Goch (other alias Gove, Gough), Robert Cary (born 1533) who married Christian Dennis and Agnes Cary.

== Death ==
Hody died on 18 June 1524.

== Notes ==
Attribution

This article incorporates text from a publication now in the public domain: Lee, Sidney, ed. (1891). "Hody, William". Dictionary of National Biography. Vol. 27. London: Smith, Elder & Co.

Legal offices
Preceded by Humphrey Starkey	Lord Chief Baron of the Exchequer; 1486–1513	Succeeded by John Scot
Preceded by Morgan Kidwelly	Attorney General; 1485–1486	Succeeded by James Hobart
