= Xylonite =

Xylonite may refer to:

- Xylonite (plastic), an 1870s brand name for thermoplastic celluloid
- SB Xylonite, a Thames barge built in 1926
