= Humphrey Starkey =

British judge

Sir Humphrey Starkey SL (died 1486) was a British justice.

He studied at Inner Temple and was made Recorder of London in 1471. In 1478 he was made a Serjeant-at-Law, allowing him to practice in the Court of Common Pleas. He served briefly as Lord Chief Baron of the Exchequer in 1483 but was moved later that year, becoming Fourth Justice of the Court of Common Pleas and dying in office in 1486.

He had previously married Isabella, who outlived him but died in 1496; their four daughters split his estate Wouldham between them. His daughter Anne Starkey (d. 26 December 1488) married firstly John Writtle, esquire, and secondly Sir John Raynsford (died 1521) and they were the parents of Sir John Raynsford the politician.

== Notes ==
Legal offices
| Preceded by Sir William of Nottingham | Lord Chief Baron of the Exchequer; 1483 | Succeeded by William Hody |
| Preceded by Unknown | Fourth Justice of the Common Pleas; 1483–1486 | Succeeded by William Calow |
