= William Calow =

William Calow (died 1487) was an English justice. He was educated at Middle Temple and was made a Serjeant-at-Law in 1479. On 31 January 1487 he became Fourth Justice of the Court of Common Pleas, but died later that year.

Legal offices
Preceded by Humfrey Starky	Fourth Justice of the Common Pleas; 1487	Succeeded by William Danvers
