= Blue Mermaid =

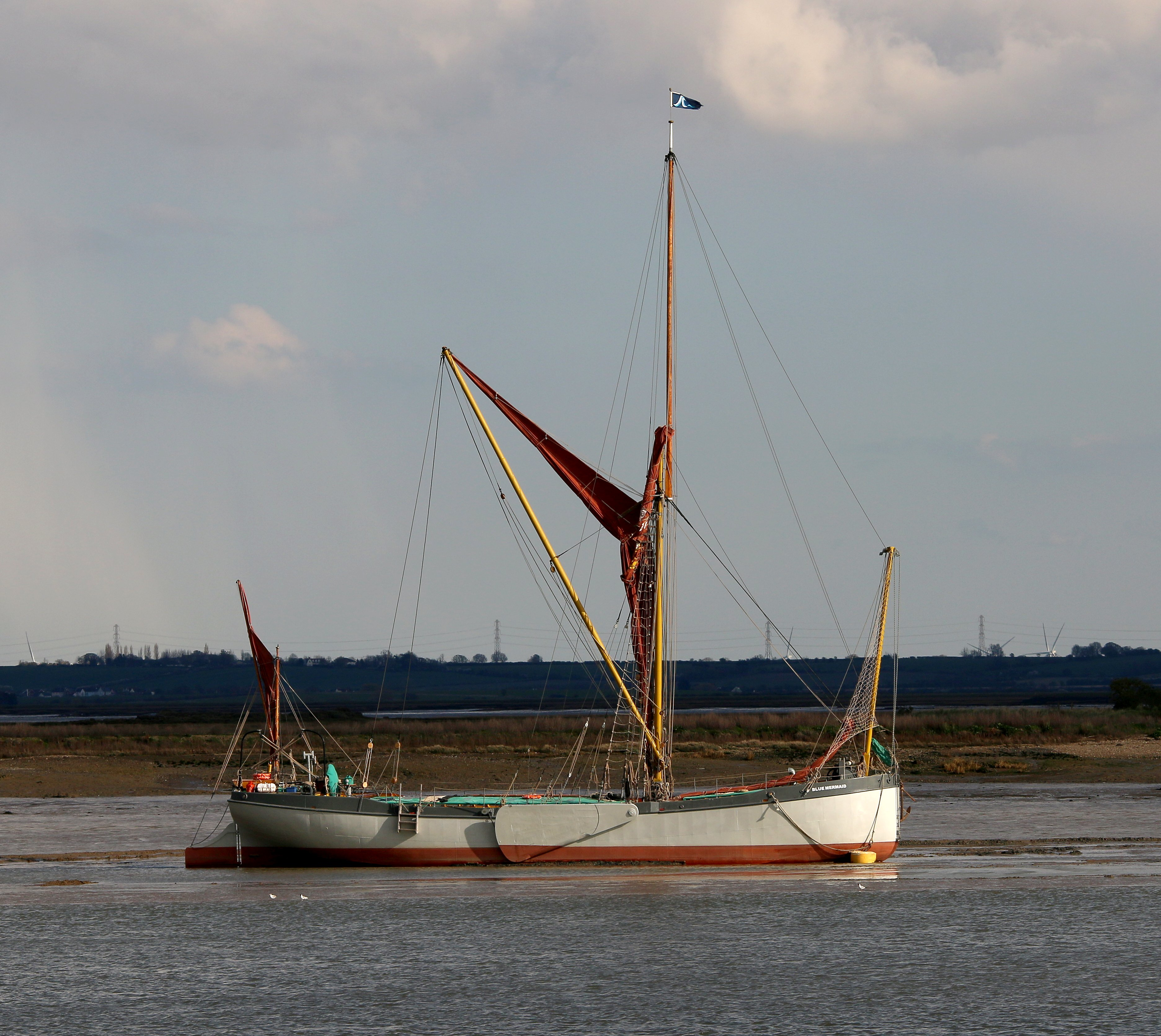
- Blue Mermaid after 2019 rebuild

General characteristics
- Type: Thames barge
- Length: 87.84 feet (26.77 m)
- Propulsion: Sails
- Sail plan: Spritsail with bowsprit

Blue Mermaid is a replica steel-hulled Thames sailing barge constructed between 2015 and 2019. She was built specifically to operate under sail and does not carry an engine. She is a replica of an older vessel of the same name, built in 1930 but sunk by enemy action during the Second World War.

== Blue Mermaid (2015) ==
Blue Mermaid was built to carry cargo, and in 2023 she received permission from the Maritime and Coastguard Agency to carry cargoes of up to 110 tonnes, on the Thames and along the North Sea coast between Lowestoft and Sandwich. In 1900 there were around 4,000 such barges, each with a crew of two and using just the wind and the tide, but she is the first sailing barge built for trade in Britain since 1930 and the first since the 1970s to be authorised as a commercial cargo carrier.

Blue Mermaid is 87 feet (27 m) long and has a hold that can carry 84 pallettes or 150 short tons (140 t) of loose cargo. She has a couple of cabins aft for skipper and mate and bunks forward for five or six more crew. The hold can also be used for accommodation when it is empty.

Blue Mermaid was built at Toms shipyard in Polruan, near Fowey in Cornwall, and launched from there as a bare hull on 28 May 2016. The vessel was towed around the coast to Maldon where she was fitted out at the Downs Road Boatyard. She will operate out of the Heybridge Basin.

Blue Mermaid belongs to the Maldon-based charity Sea Change Sailing Trust who have many years of experience taking all kinds of people sailing. Richard Titchener with his partner Hilary Halajko, runs both the barge and Sea Change Sailing Trust. They are also involved in training young people for a hands-on career in Maritime Heritage, supplying crew with heritage sail experience, essential for looking after and sailing the aging fleet of Britain's historic vessels.

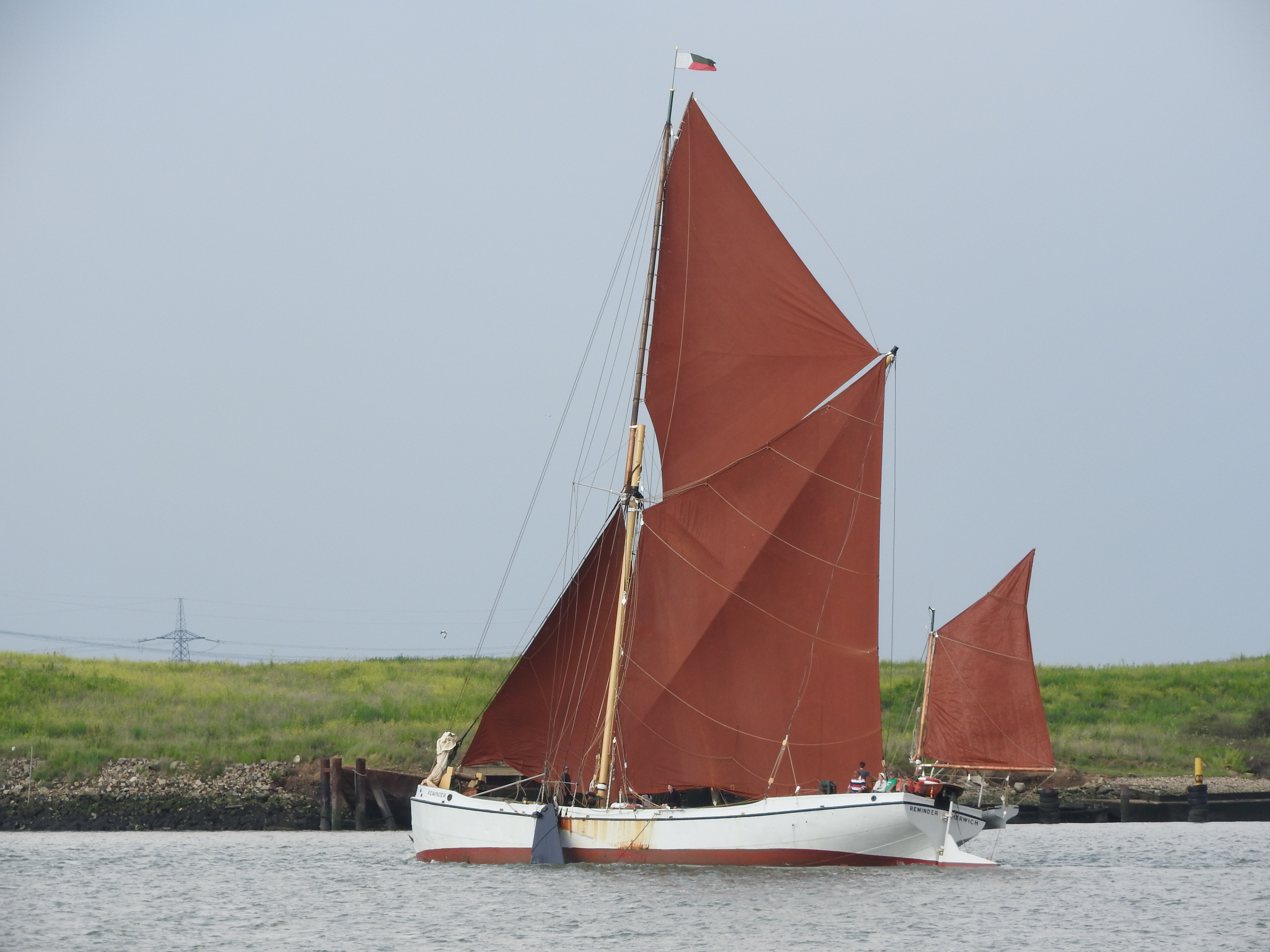
- Reminder (sister ship) from Gillingham Pier

History

United Kingdom
- Name: Blue Mermaid(1930–1942)
- Owner: F W Horlock, Mistley
- Builder: Mistley Shipping Company
- Launched: 1930
- Fate: Destroyed through enemy action

General characteristics
- Type: Thames barge
- Tonnage: 108 GRT
- Length: 87.84 feet (26.77 m)
- Beam: 19.38 feet (5.91 m)
- Draught: 6.49 feet (1.98 m)
- Propulsion: Sails
- Sail plan: Spritsail with bowsprit

== Blue Mermaid (1930) ==
Blue Mermaid was one of seven Thames barges built between 1925 and 1930 for F W Horlock, Mistley.

In 1924 the Horlocks commissioned seven new steel Thames barges, of which Blue Mermaid was the sixth. Six of these 'seven sisters' are still afloat: Blue Mermaid was lost to a mine in World War II. They were built at Mistley.

The Horlocks steel barges - the seven sisters
Name	Active	Built	Tons	Official no.	Current owner
Repertor	Yes	1924	69	145404	David Pollock
Portlight	No	1925	68	145405	Landbreach Ltd
Xylonite	Yes	1926	68	145408	Tim Kent
Reminder	Yes	1929	79	161033	Topsail Charters Ltd
Adieu	Yes	1929	79	161035	Iolo Brooks
Blue Mermaid	No	1930	79	161038	(destroyed)
Resourceful	No	1930	77	161039	I & R Stubbs
Ref	As of 2016				
