= SB Xylonite =

Thames barge built in 1926

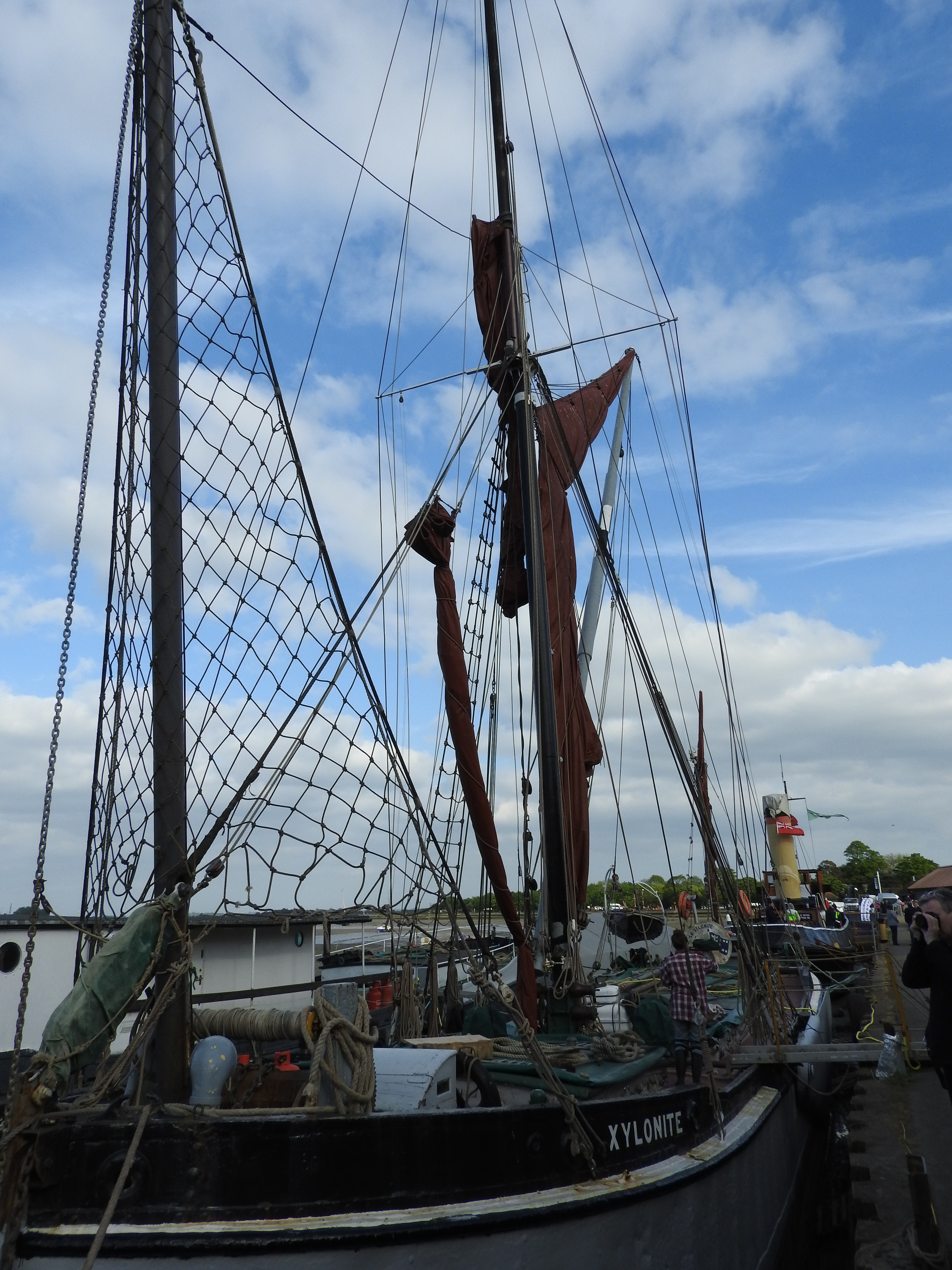
- Xylonite at Maldon, 2017

History

United Kingdom
- Name: Proposed name BX (1926-26); Name Xylonite(1926-)
- Owner: F W Horlock, Mistley
- Builder: Mistley Shipping Company
- Launched: 1926
- Identification: Historic Ships Register Certificate 236; United Kingdom Official Number 145408
- Status: Sailing

General characteristics
- Class & type: Thames barge
- Tonnage: 68 GRT
- Length: 86.95 feet (26.50 m)
- Beam: 18.49 feet (5.64 m)
- Draught: 2.98 feet (0.91 m)
- Propulsion: Sails (Gardner 85hp 5 cylinder (5LW) aux.)
- Sail plan: Spritsail with bowsprit
- Notes: Website:

Xylonite is one of seven Thames barges built between 1925 and 1930 for F W Horlock, Mistley. She was sold by the Horlocks in 1958 and cut down to a motor barge in 1958. Xylonite was re-rigged in the 1970s by Tim Eliff and replated on the 1980s. She has been used for sail training since 1983.

== Description ==
Xylonite is 86.95 feet (26.50 m) long, with a beam of 18.49 feet (5.64 m) and a draught of 2.98 feet (0.91 m). She is assessed at 68 GRT. She is built of steel, and while lacking the romance of a wooden ship, she has a greater cargo carrying capacity, and is lighter and cheaper to operate. The name Xylonite derives from the original 1869 name for celluloid.

== History ==
In 1924 the Horlocks commissioned seven new steel Thames barges, of which Xylonite was the third. Six of these 'seven sisters' are still afloat: Blue Mermaid was lost to a mine in World War 2. They were built at Mistley.

The Horlocks steel barges- the seven sisters
Name	Active	Built	Tons	Official no.	Current owner
Repertor	Yes	1924	69	145404	David Pollock
Portlight	No	1925	68	145405	Landbreach Ltd
Xylonite	Yes	1926	68	145408	Chris Palmer
Reminder	Yes	1929	79	161033	Topsail Charters Ltd
Adieu	Yes	1929	79	161035	Iolo Brooks
Blue Mermaid	No	1930	79	161038	(destroyed)
Resourceful	No	1930	77	161039	I & R Stubbs
Ref	As of 2016				

Xylonite was built in 1926 and delivered to Frederick William Horlock,(F.W. Horlock) who owned her for the first ten years. On 30 October 1936 Xylonite was sold to Marcus Frederick Horlock and Walter Richard Horlock. And on 31 October 1938 she was registered to M.F. Horlock and Company Ltd. Horlocks barges sailed under a blue burgee blazoned with a white maltese cross.

She was sold in August 1958 to The Greenhithe Lighterage Company Ltd and the Tester family. She was cut down to a motor barge, with all rigging removed and a new wheelhouse. The rear hold was modified to take a diesel engine. She carried cargo until June 1977.

From 1977 to 1984 she was owned by Tim and Brigid Eliff. They restored her to sail and rerigged her and she was run as a charter barge from the alongside the Prospect of Whitby pub in Wapping. She was chartered to Hoseasons, and carried purple coloured Duradon sails. The topmast was made from steel and would often buckle.

For the next twenty-two years, from 1984 to 2007 she was run by the Cirdan Trust, who used her to give sailing experiences to underprivileged children. This trust was run by Bill Broad, an Anglican churchman, his wife Daphne and John Corder Belfrage. The barge skipper Rebecca Polden and her partner bought her next, and did some serious restoration work and sold her on in summer 2011. They used her as a houseboat at Maylandsea.

Tim Kent, a London-based photographer operated her between 2011 and 2016 on the Medway and the London River.

She is currently owned by Chris Palmer and based in Pin Mill

The United Kingdom Official Number was 145408

A replica of the Blue Mermaid is being constructed, and she was launched 28 May 2016 for the Sea-Change Sailing Trust. She will operate out of the Heybridge Basin.

== Media ==
- Dunkirk (2017 film) had a role.
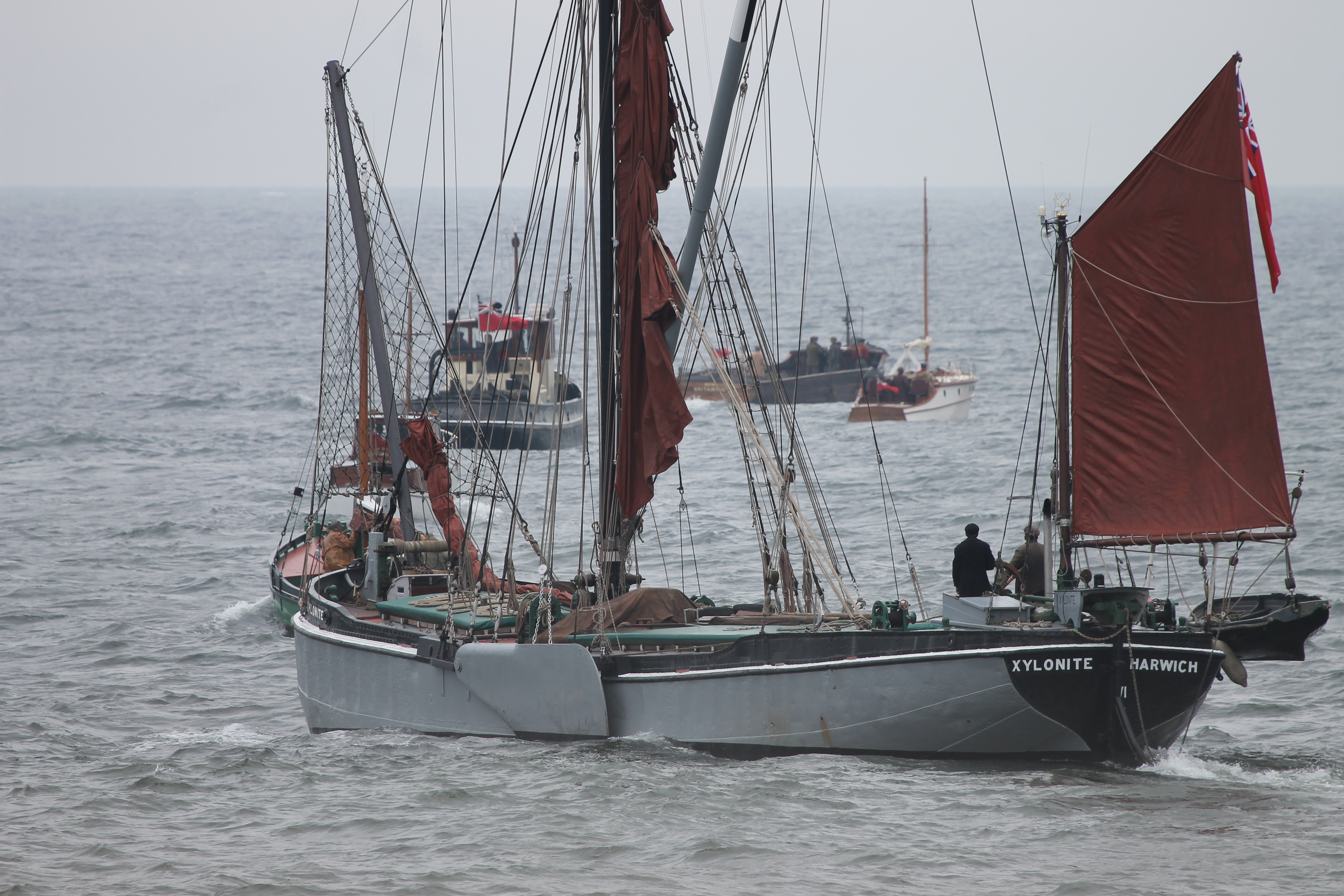
  Xylonite filming
