= Bradfield railway station =

Disused railway station in England

Coordinates: 51.93995°N 1.11112°E

Bradfield
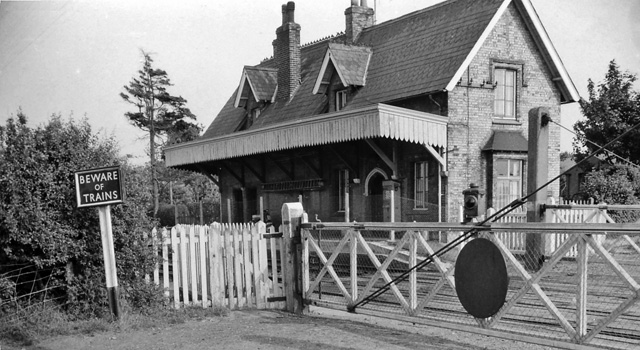
- Bradfield station in June 1963

General information
- Location: Bradfield, Tendring; England
- Platforms: 2

Other information
- Status: Disused

History
- Original company: Eastern Union Railway; Eastern Counties Railway
- Pre-grouping: Great Eastern Railway
- Post-grouping: London and North Eastern Railway

Key dates
- 15 August 1854: Opened
- 2 July 1956: Closed
Location

Bradfield railway station served the village of Bradfield in Essex. It was on the Manningtree to Harwich branch line, which is today known as The Mayflower Line. It closed in 1956. Consisting of just two through platforms it had no sidings for working local goods traffic, which was the normal scenario in rural East Anglia. The station buildings on the up platform were particularly splendid for a very small station and were captured by the well known and popular transport artist Malcolm Root FGRA. The facilities on the down platform were very modest by comparison. The station had a very restricted catchment area and with a local population of just 730 in 1901 and 811 in 1961, passenger numbers were always very limited. A level crossing at the west end of the station was controlled by a signal box on the up side with just 12 levers.

Preceding station	Historical railways	Following station
Mistley; Line and station open	Eastern Region of British Railways; Mayflower line	Priory Halt; Line open, station closed
