= SB Marjorie =

English sailing barge

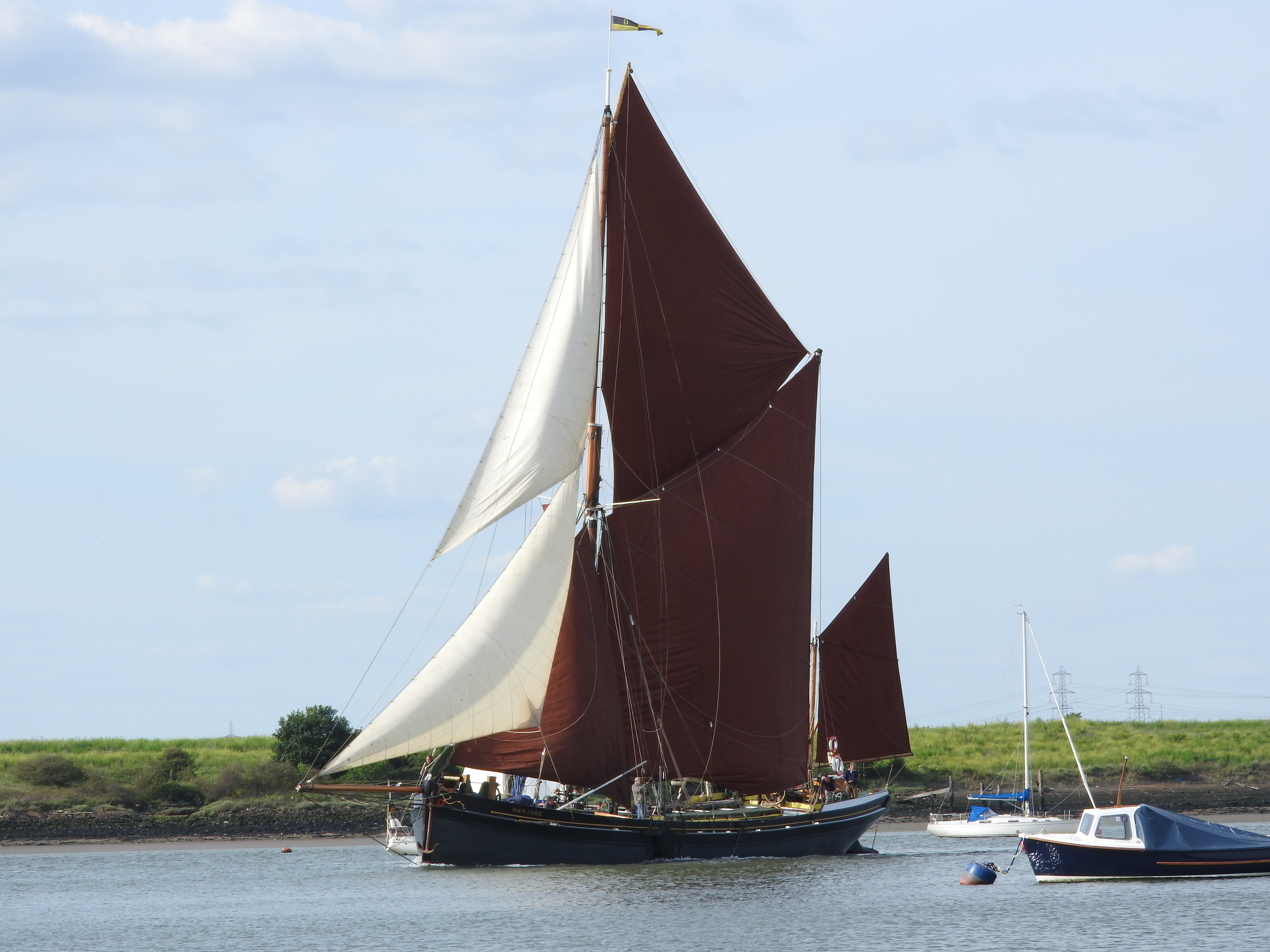
- Marjorie in the 2017 Medway Barge Race

History

United Kingdom
- Name: Marjorie
- Owner: R. & W. Paul Ltd; A. J. O'Shea; Albert Groom; London Docklands Development Corporation (L.D.D.C); Simon Devonshire
- Builder: R. & W. Paul Ltd, Ipswich
- Launched: 1898
- Identification: UK Official Number 113753
- Status: In service

General characteristics
- Class & type: Thames barge
- Tonnage: 73 GRT; 56 NRT
- Length: 84.1 feet (25.63 m)
- Beam: 19.3 feet (5.88 m)
- Draught: 3.0 feet (0.91 m)
- Depth: 6.2 feet (1.89 m)
- Propulsion: Sail
- Sail plan: Spritsail

Sailing barge Marjorie is a 73 gross ton wooden spritsail sailing barge, built by R. & W. Paul Ltd. at Ipswich, Suffolk, England in 1902 for their own account. She was used to carry grain and other cargoes on the River Thames, its estuary and to coastal ports.

In 1960, after fifty two years of trading under sail for the same owner, Marjorie was retired and then sold for ongoing operation as a historic vessel, classed as a yacht. She remains active as at 2025.

Thames barge sail names taken from Underhills measurements

== See also ==
- Thames Sailing Barge Match
