= Edwin Harris Dunning =

Royal Navy officer and aviator (1892–1917)

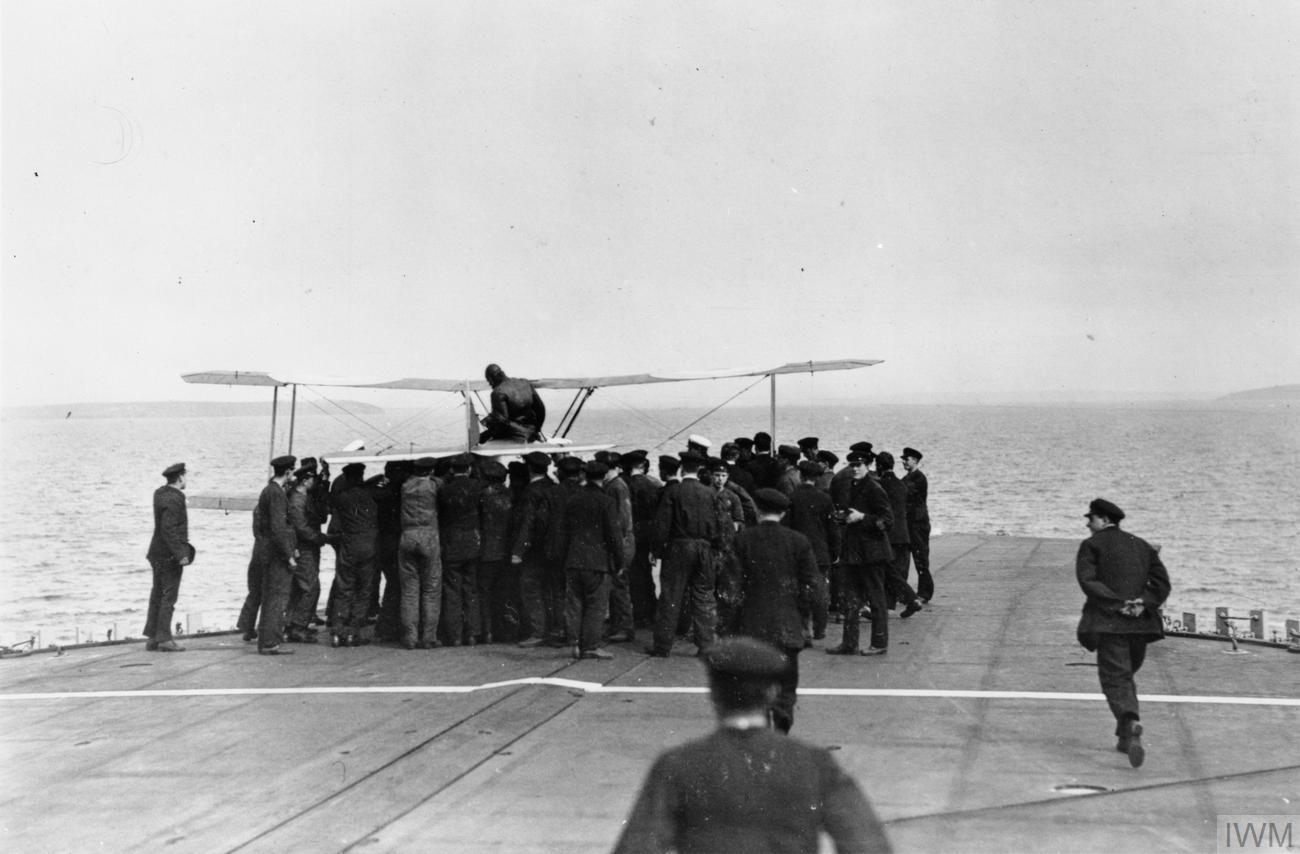
- Dunning is congratulated after landing on HMS Furious in his Sopwith Pup on 2 August 1917
- Born: 17 July 1892; South Africa
- Died: 7 August 1917 (aged 25); Scapa Flow, Orkney
- Burial place: Bradfield, Essex
- Military career
- Allegiance: United Kingdom
- Branch: Royal Naval Air Service
- Service years: at least 1916–1917
- Rank: Squadron Commander
- Conflicts: World War I
- Awards: Distinguished Service Cross

Squadron Commander Edwin Harris Dunning, DSC (17 July 1892 – 7 August 1917), of the British Royal Naval Air Service, was the first pilot to land an aircraft on a moving ship.

== Early life ==
Dunning was born in South Africa on 17 July 1892, the second child of Sir Edwin Harris Dunning of Jacques Hall, Bradfield, Essex. He was educated at Royal Naval Colleges at Osborne and Dartmouth.

== First landing on a moving ship ==
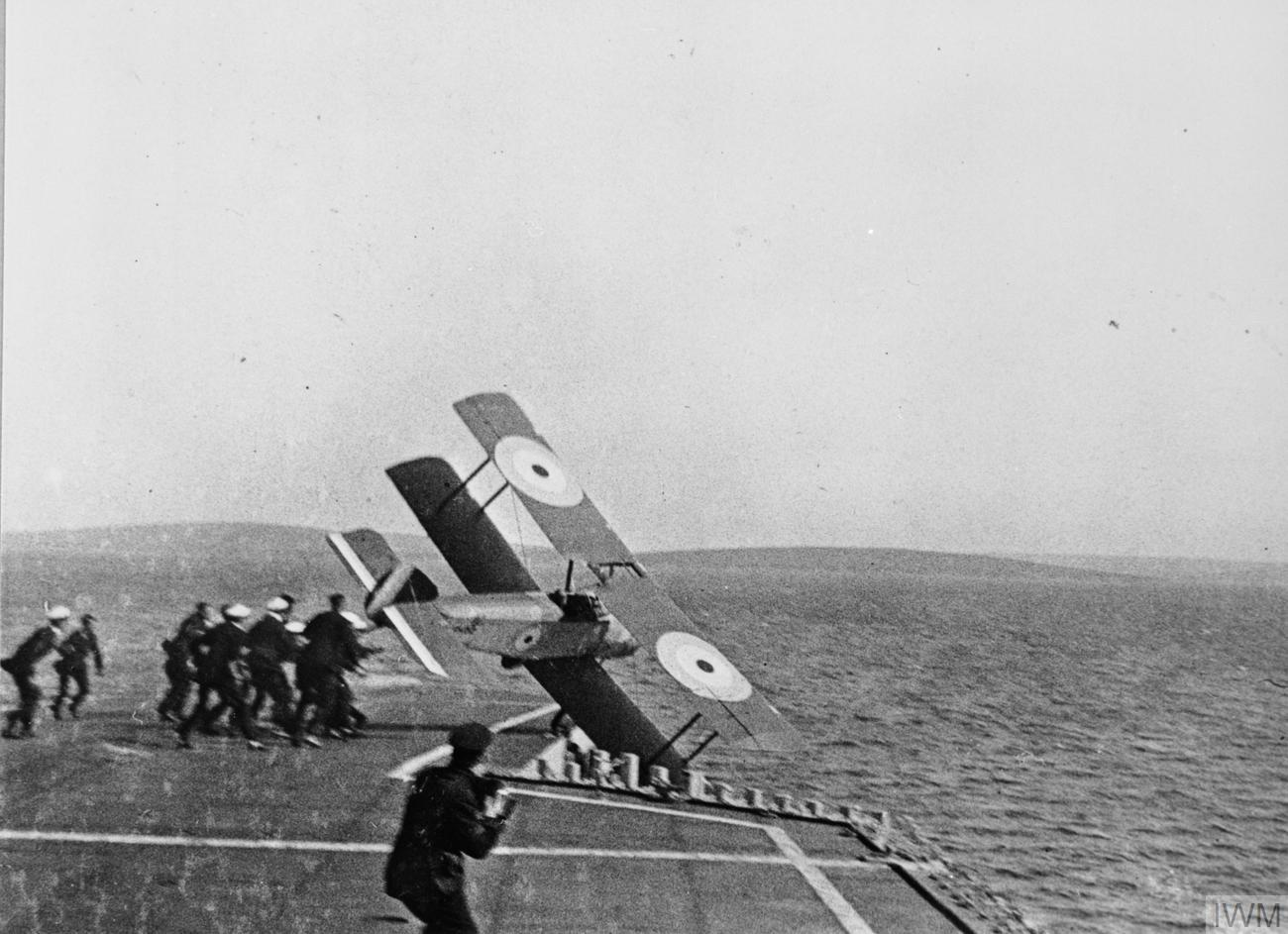
Dunning's Sopwith Pup veering off the flight deck of HMS Furious during his fatal attempt to land on the carrier while underway, August 7, 1917

Dunning landed his Sopwith Pup on HMS Furious in Scapa Flow, Orkney on 2 August 1917. With the ship steaming at 26 knots into a 21 knot wind, his speed over the deck was a few miles per hour. After flying to the left of the bridge and funnel, he steered his plane to the right until it slid over the deck, before cutting the engine, letting it drop onto the ship's deck.

He was killed five days later, during his third landing attempt of the day, when an updraft caught his port wing, throwing his plane overboard. Knocked unconscious, he drowned in the cockpit.

He is buried at St Lawrence's Church, Bradfield, between his parents. A plaque in the church states:

The Admiralty wish you to know what great service he performed for the Navy. It was in fact a demonstration of landing an Aeroplane on the deck of a Man-of-War whilst the latter was under way. This had never been done before;and the data obtained was of the utmost value. It will make Aeroplanes indispensable to a fleet;& possibly, revolutionise Naval Warfare. The risk taken by Squadron Commander Dunning needed much courage. He had already made two successful landings; but expressed a wish to land again himself, before other pilots did so; and in this last run he was killed. My Lords desire to place on record their sense of the loss to the Naval Service of this gallant Officer.

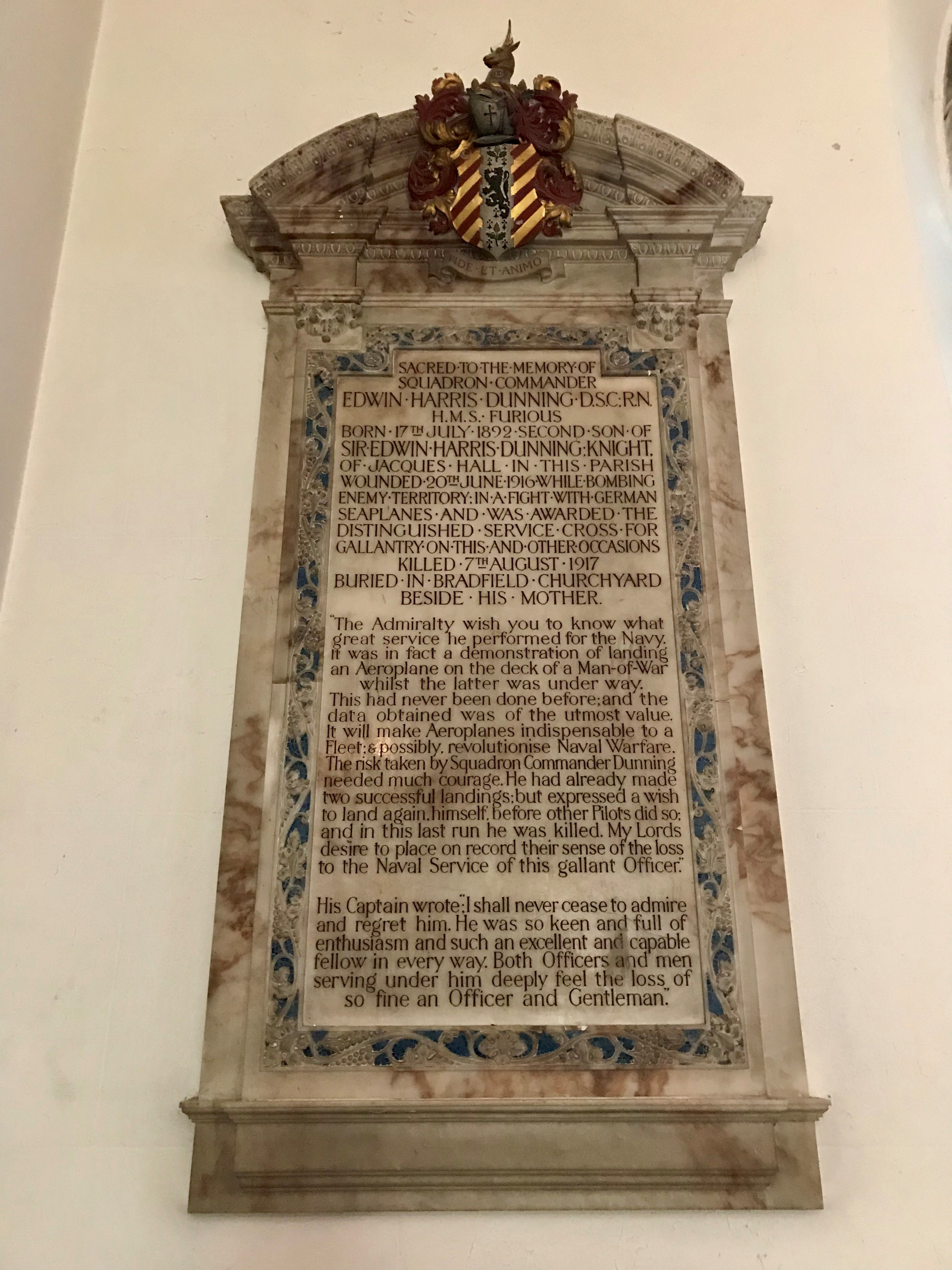
Dunning memorial plaque at St. Lawrence church in Bradfield, Essex

In memory of Dunning, the Dunning Cup or Dunning Memorial Cup is given annually to the officer who is considered to have done most to further aviation in connection with the Fleet for the year in question. In the 1950s and 1960s it was awarded to Royal Air Force squadrons which achieved the highest standard on courses at the Joint Anti-Submarine School.

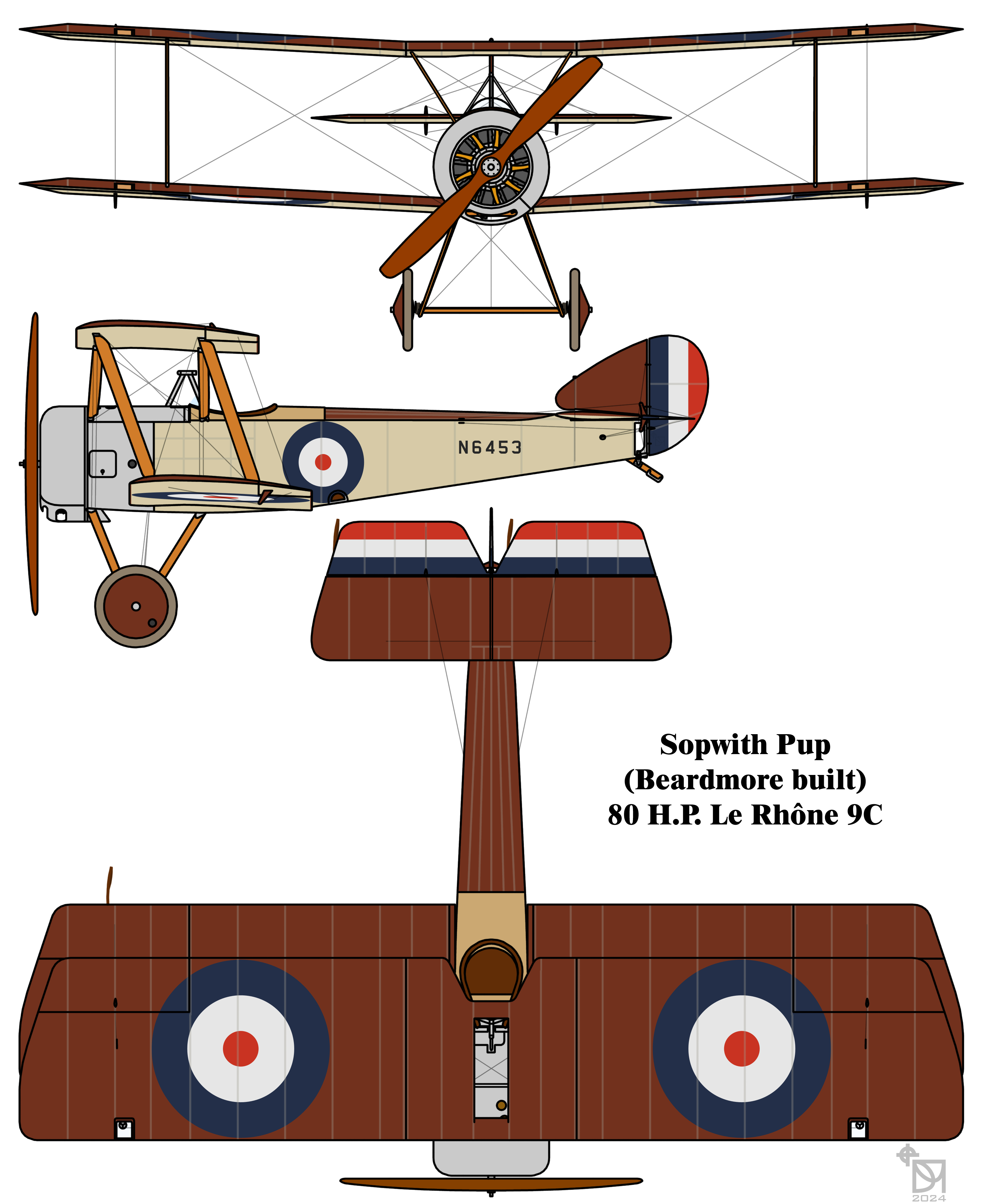
Colour drawing of the Beardmore-built Sopwith Pup N6453, flown by Sqn Cmdr Dunning for the first aircraft landing on an aircraft carrier, on 2 August 1917

== Honours and awards ==
- 14 March 1916 – Flight Lieutenant Edwin Harris Dunning, RNAS is awarded the Distinguished Service Cross- having "performed exceptionally good work as a seaplane flyer, making many long flights both for spotting and photographing."
- 14 March 1916 – mentioned in despatches for service at Gallipoli.
- 1 October 1917 – The following Officers and Men have been mentioned in despatches – Sqdrn. Cdr. Edwin Harris Dunning, DSC., RNAS (since killed).
