= SB Adieu =

Sailing vessel built in 1929

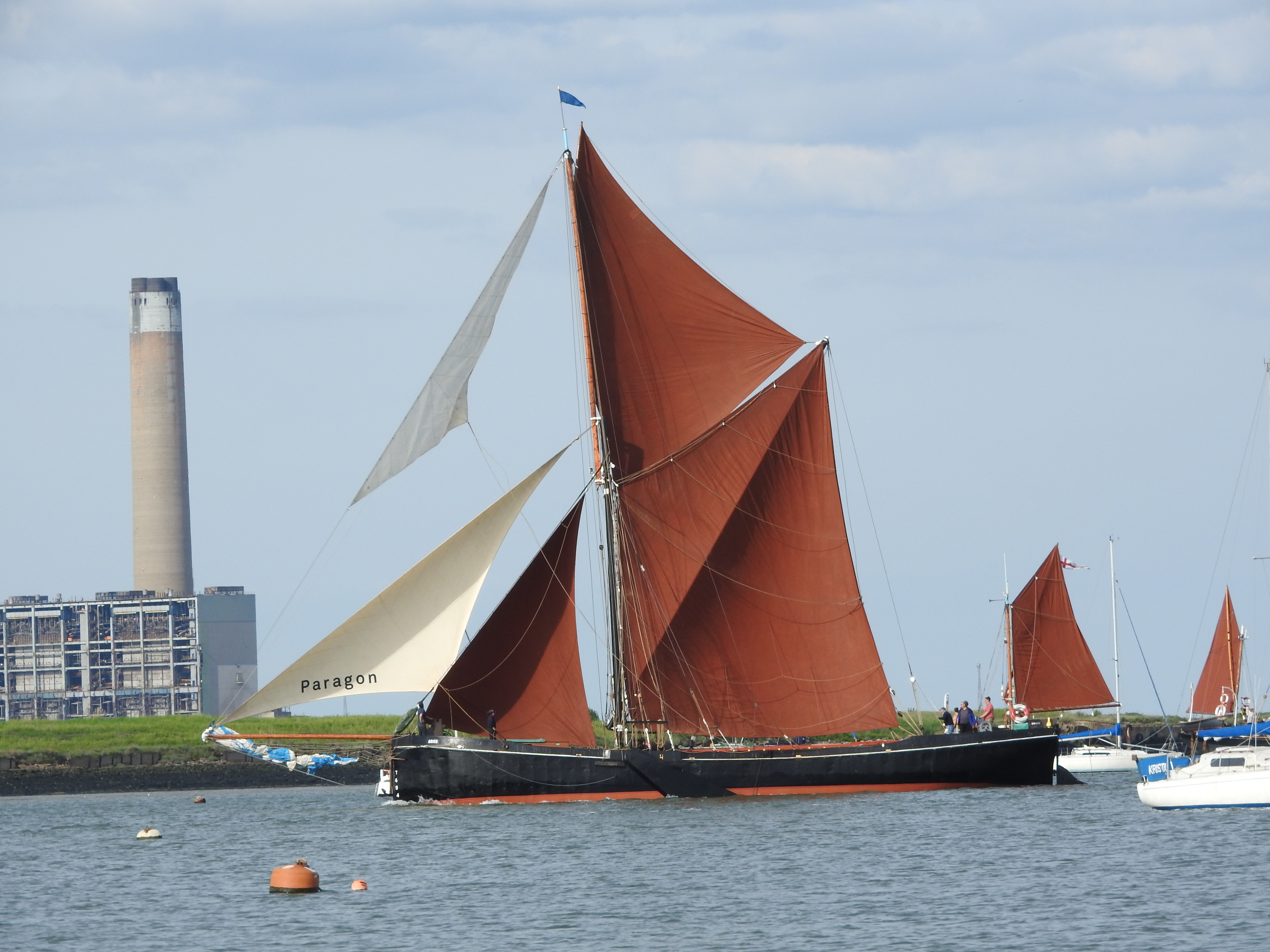
- Adieu from Gillingham Strand

History

United Kingdom
- Name: Adieu(1929-)
- Owner: F W Horlock, Mistley; Johnny Law
- Builder: Mistley Shipping Company
- Launched: 1929
- Identification: United Kingdom Official Number 161035
- Status: Private yacht

General characteristics
- Class & type: Thames barge
- Tonnage: 79 GRT
- Length: 87.84 feet (26.77 m)
- Beam: 19.38 feet (5.91 m)
- Draught: 6.49 feet (1.98 m)
- Propulsion: Sails
- Sail plan: Spritsail with bowsprit

Adieu is one of seven Thames barges built between 1925 and 1930 for F W Horlock, Mistley.

== History ==
In 1924 the Horlocks commissioned seven new steel Thames barges, of which Adieu was the fifth. Six of these 'seven sisters' are still afloat: Blue Mermaid was lost to a mine in World War 2. They were built at Mistley.

The Horlocks steel barges- the seven sisters
Name	Active	Built	Tons	Official no.	Current owner
Repertor	Yes	1924	69	145404	David Pollock
Portlight	No	1925	68	145405	Landbreach Ltd
Xylonite	Yes	1926	68	145408	Tim Kent
Reminder	Yes	1929	79	161033	Topsail Charters Ltd
Adieu	Yes	1929	79	161035	Johnny Law
Blue Mermaid	No	1930	79	161038	(destroyed)
Resourceful	No	1930	77	161039	I & R Stubbs
Ref	As of 2016				
