= John Raynsford =

16th-century English politician

Sir John Raynsford (by 1482 – 1559) was an English politician.

John Raynsford was the only son of Sir John Raynsford of Bradfield Hall, Essex, and his first wife, Anne Starkey (d. 26 December 1488), widow of John Writtle, esquire, and daughter and coheir of Sir Humphrey Starkey of Littlehall in Wouldham, Kent, Chief Baron of the Exchequer. After the death of Anne (née Starkey), Raynsford's father married Margaret Ilam, widow of Sir John Shaa, Lord Mayor of London, and daughter of Thomas Ilam (d. 1482) and Jane Verdon, by whom he had a daughter, Julian Raynsford, who married Sir William Waldegrave of Smallbridge, Suffolk.

Raynsford succeeded his father in 1521. He was a captain in the army in the French wars and was knighted on 1 July 1523 for his services. He served as a justice of the peace for Essex from 1523 to 1530 and from 1536 until his death and was appointed High Sheriff of Essex and Hertfordshire for 1537–38.

He was elected member of parliament (MP) for Colchester in 1529.

Raynsford married firstly Elizabeth or Isabel Knyvet, the daughter and heiress of Edward Knyvet of Suffolk, and secondly Winifred Pympe, the daughter and heiress of John Pympe of Nettlestead, Kent. He had no issue by either of his marriages.
