= Priory Halt railway station =

Disused railway station in Tendring, Essex

Priory Halt

General information
- Location: Tendring, Essex; England
- Coordinates: 51.938°N 1.1511°E
- Grid reference: TM167313
- Platforms: 2

Other information
- Status: Disused

History
- Original company: Great Eastern Railway
- Pre-grouping: Great Eastern Railway
- Post-grouping: LNER

Key dates
- 1 January 1920: Opened
- 1 February 1965: Closed
Location

Priory Halt railway station served the district of Tendring, Essex, England, from 1920 to 1965 on the Mayflower Line.

== History ==
The station opened on 1 January 1920 by the Great Eastern Railway. It was intended for admiralty use only and it was paid by them; there was an admiralty depot nearby. The station closed on 1 February 1965.

Preceding station	Historical railways	Following station
Bradfield; Line open, station closed	Great Eastern Railway; Mayflower Line	Wrabness; Line open, station open
