= SB Niagara =

English sailing barge

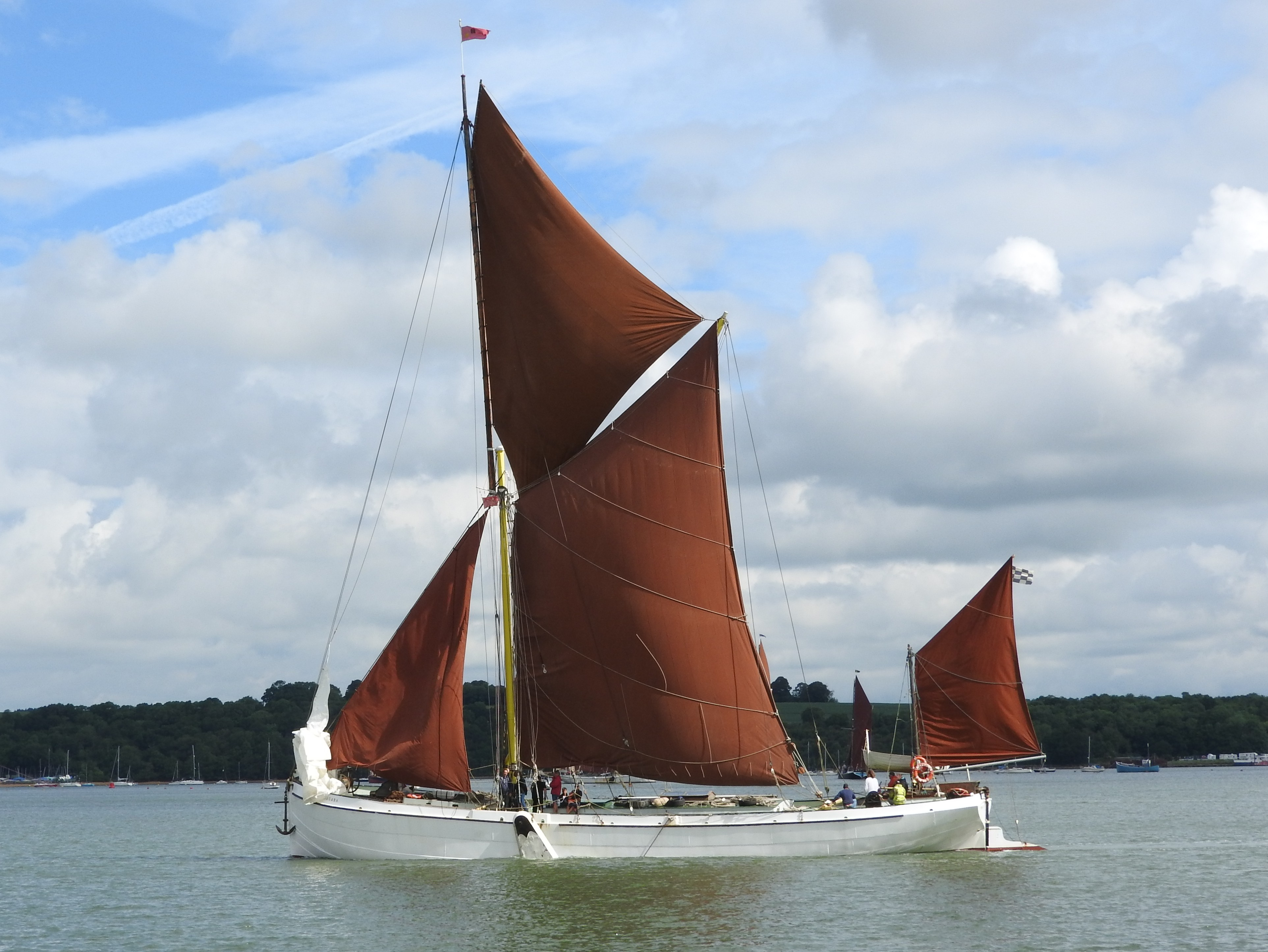
- Niagara competing in the 109th Medway Barge Sailing match, viewed from the shore at Gillingham Pier

History

United Kingdom
- Name: Niagara (1900–25)
- Owner: LRTC; Deptford Community Centre; Peter Sands
- Builder: Forrestt of Wivenhoe
- Launched: 1898
- Identification: UK official number 108373
- Status: Sailing
- Notes: Restored, and competed in the 2013 Thames Sailing Barge Match

General characteristics
- Class & type: Thames barge
- Tonnage: 79 GRT; Net 116
- Length: 86.7 feet (26.43 m)
- Beam: 20.6 feet (6.28 m)
- Draught: 6.7 feet (2.04 m)
- Propulsion: Sails, auxiliary motor fitted 1924
- Sail plan: Spritsail

SB Niagara is a 79-ton Thames sailing barge, built by Forrestt at Wivenhoe, Essex, England in 1898 for the London and Rochester Trading Company. She carried cargo on the lower Thames and the English Channel. An auxiliary motor was fitted in 1924.

Thames barge sail names taken from Underhills measurements
