= SB Repertor =

Thames barge built in 1924

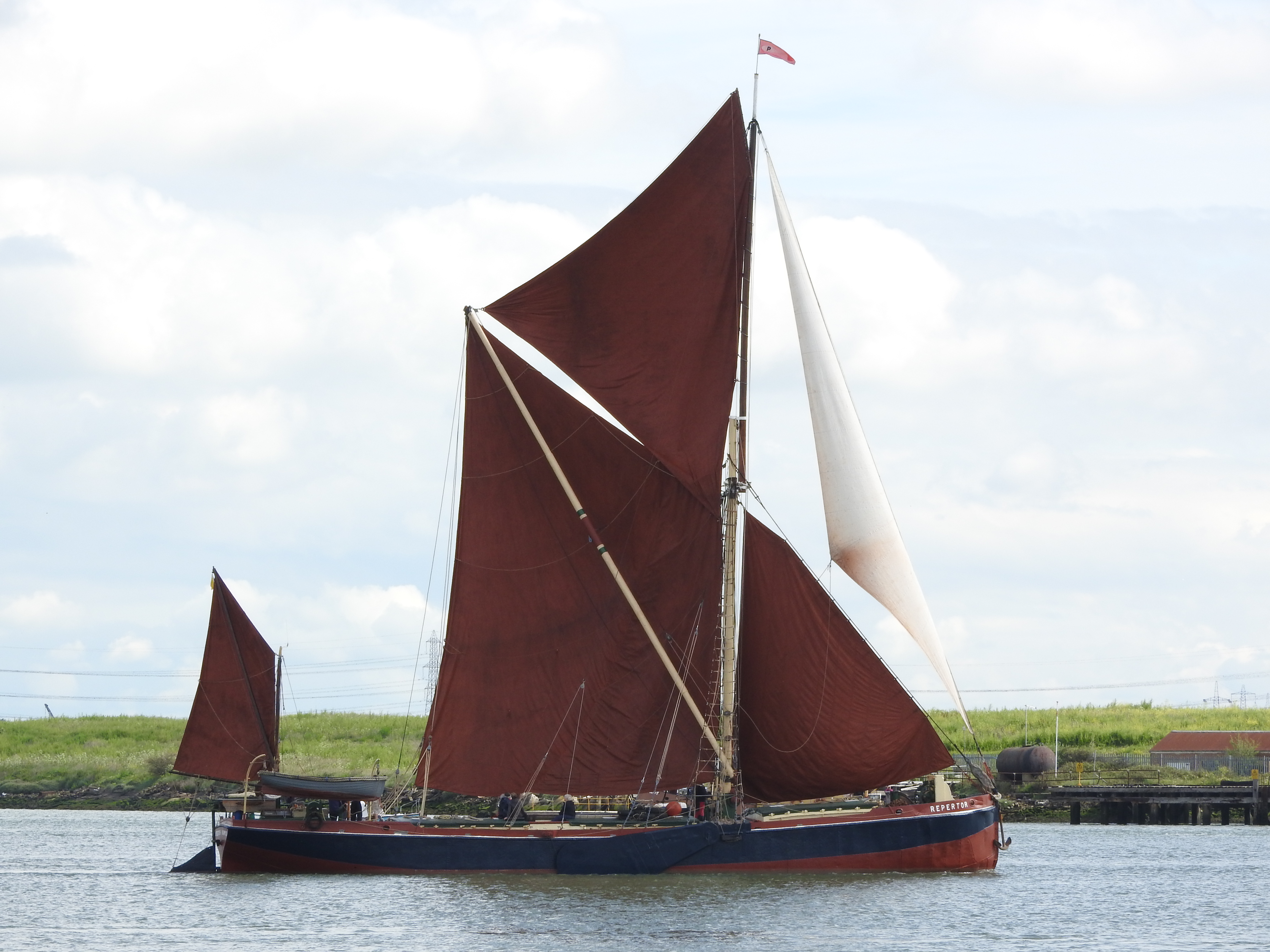
- Repertor from Gillingham Pier

History

United Kingdom
- Name: Repertor(1924-)
- Owner: F W Horlock, Mistley; David Pollock
- Builder: Mistley Shipping Company
- Launched: 1924
- Identification: United Kingdom Official Number 145404

General characteristics
- Class & type: Thames barge
- Tonnage: 108 GRT
- Length: 87.84 feet (26.77 m)
- Beam: 19.38 feet (5.91 m)
- Draught: 6.49 feet (1.98 m)
- Propulsion: Sails
- Sail plan: Spritsail
- Notes: Website: https://www.repertor.com/about

Repertor is one of seven Thames barges built between 1925 and 1930 for F W Horlock, Mistley.

== History ==
In 1924 the Horlocks commissioned seven new steel Thames barges, of which Repertor was the first. Six of these 'seven sisters' are still afloat: Blue Mermaid was lost to a mine in World War 2. They were built at Mistley.

The Horlocks steel barges- the seven sisters
Name	Active	Built	Tons	Official no.	Current owner
Repertor	Yes	1924	69	145404	David Pollock
Portlight	No	1925	68	145405	Landbreach Ltd
Xylonite	Yes	1926	68	145408	Tim Kent
Reminder	Yes	1929	79	161033	Topsail Charters Ltd
Adieu	Yes	1929	79	161035	Iolo Brooks
Blue Mermaid	No	1930	79	161038	(destroyed)
Resourceful	No	1930	77	161039	I & R Stubbs
Ref	As of 2016				
