= Mayflower line =

Railway branch line in Essex, England

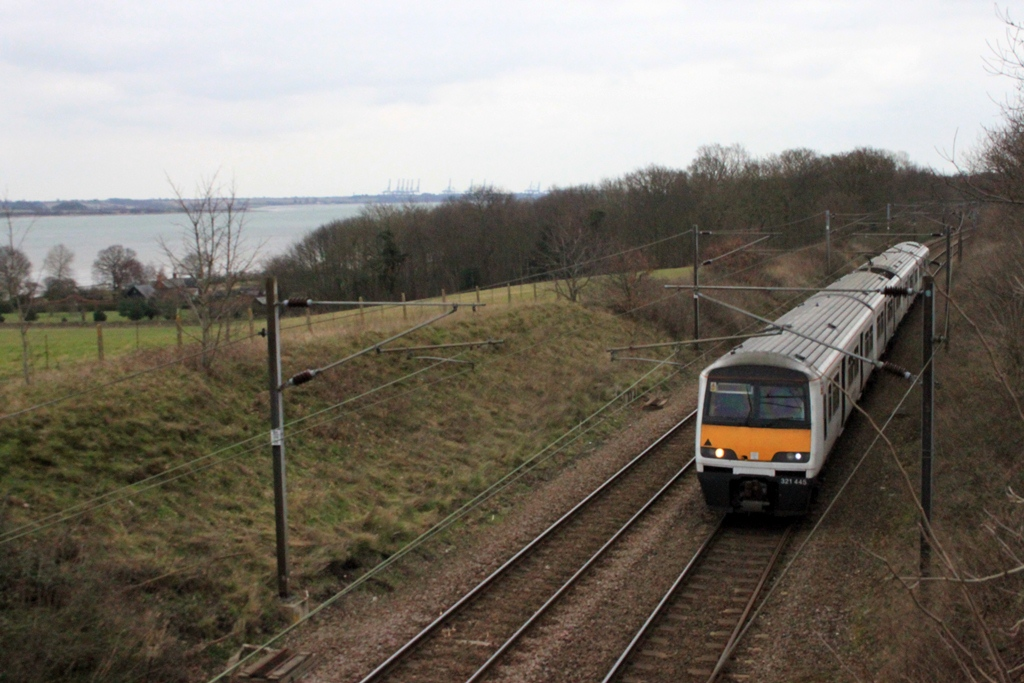
- A Class 321 train passes the River Stour near Wrabness

Overview
- Owner: Network Rail
- Locale: Essex
- Stations: 6

Service
- Type: Heavy rail
- Operator: Greater Anglia
- Rolling stock: Class 755, Class 720,

History
- Opened: 15 August 1854

Technical
- Line length: 11 miles 16 chains (18.02 km)
- Track gauge: 1,435 mm (4 ft 8 1/2 in) standard gauge
- Electrification: 25 kV AC OHLE
- Operating speed: 60 miles per hour (97 km/h)
Route map
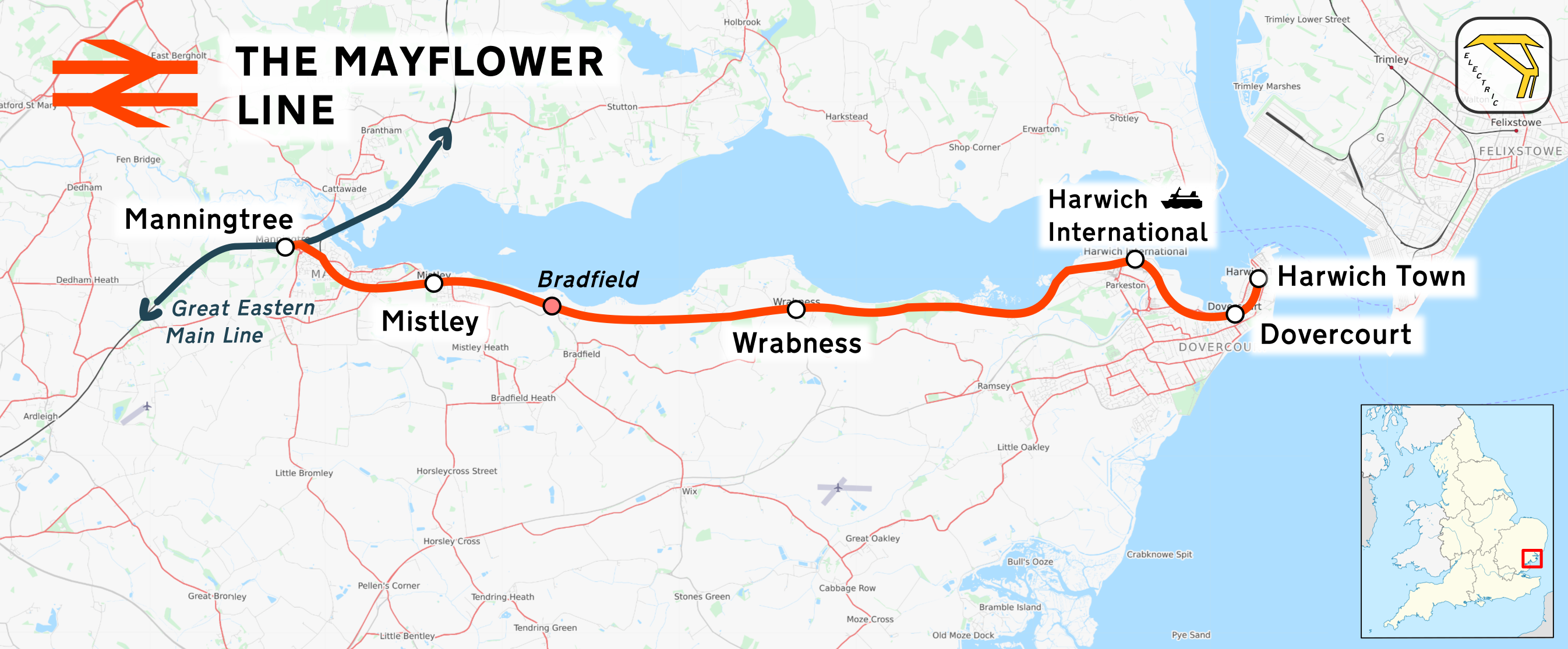
(Click to expand)

The Mayflower line is a railway branch line in the east of England that links Manningtree, on the Great Eastern Main Line, to Harwich Town. During peak times, many services connect to or from the main line and its London terminus at Liverpool Street. The Mayflower line has six stations, including the two termini, and is situated within the county of Essex.

The route is 11 miles 16 chains (18.02 km) in length from where it branches off the main line west of the town of Manningtree to its eastern terminus in Harwich. It is part of Network Rail Strategic Route 7, SRS 07.07, and is classified as a London and South East commuter line. The Engineer's Line Reference for the line is MAH.

As of December 2016, passenger services on the Mayflower line are operated by Greater Anglia, which also manages all of the stations. The typical service frequency is one train per hour in each direction. The timetabled journey time between Manningtree and Harwich Town is 22 minutes.

The Mayflower line takes its name from the Pilgrim ship Mayflower, which is believed to have been built in Harwich in the 16th century. Harwich was also home to the ship's captain and part-owner, Christopher Jones.

== History ==
The Eastern Counties Railway (ECR) had originally proposed plans to extend what is now the Great Eastern Main Line from Colchester to Harwich, although this was a cause for concern to the town of Ipswich, which was a rival port.

In 1846 a railway line from Manningtree to Harwich proposed by the Eastern Union Railway (EUR) was approved by the Railway Commissioners. In 1853 an agreement was reached between the companies, with the ECR taking over the working of the EUR from 1 January 1854. The single-line branch opened on 15 August 1854.

In 1862 the ECR and the EUR merged to form the Great Eastern Railway (GER).

The track was doubled in 1882 by the GER, and the Manningtree North Curve which allows direct running between Ipswich and Harwich was also added at that time.

In addition to Bradfield which has since closed, there was a halt stop called Priory Halt between Wrabness and Bradfield which serviced the adjacent War Department facility; the halt station closed in 1965. There was a relatively extensive system of sidings fed from a spur on the "down" (Harwich-bound) side which was controlled by a signal box which was in use from 1918 until 1966. Use of the halt was confined to Admiralty employees only during various periods.

The War Department also had a munitions dump in Copperas Woods between Wrabness and Parkeston served by a spur which was situated on the north (river) side of the line just west of the point where the original alignment of the track to Dovercourt and Harwich Town had been changed when Parkeston was built. This spur was controlled by a signal box, named Primrose Box, reflecting the profusion of primroses which grew lineside in the area.

In 1948 following nationalisation the line became part of British Railways Eastern Region.

By the late 1970s the cost of running the dated mechanical signalling systems north of Colchester was recognised and in 1978 a scheme for track rationalisation and re-signalling was submitted to the Department of Transport. This was followed by a proposal to electrify the Great Eastern Main Line and branch to Harwich in 1980. Electrification work was undertaken in the early – mid 1980s.

British Rail sectorised their operations in 1982. The Harwich branch was part of the London & South East Sector, which was renamed Network SouthEast in 1986.

On 14 April 1985 the first electric train consisting of two Class 308 electric multiple units (EMU) worked the line although the previous year another member of the class had been dragged from Ipswich to Parkeston and used for crew training. The following day a Class 86 locomotive visited the branch to test various sidings and crossings on the line. The full electric service was introduced on 12 May 1985 with InterCity Sector Class 86s working the Liverpool Street boat trains and EMUs working local services.

The line was given the marketing name the "Mayflower line" in September 1997, with a ceremony held at Mistley in the presence of local MP Ivan Henderson.

== Infrastructure ==
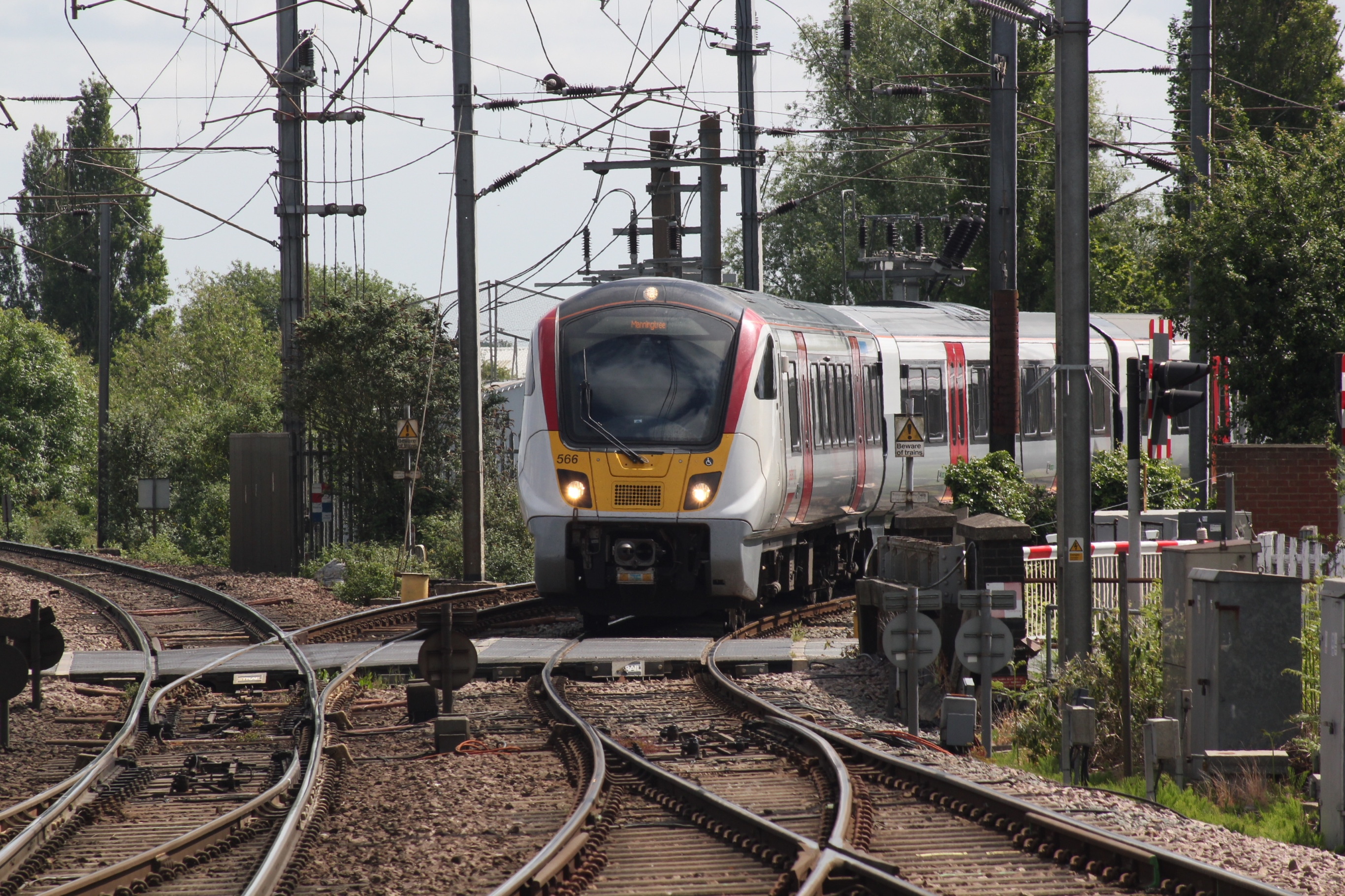
A Class 720 train leaving the Mayflower line at Manningtree South Junction

The line diverges from the Great Eastern Main Line at Manningtree and is double-track for passenger services as far as Harwich International, where connecting ferry services are available to Hook of Holland on Stena Line. Until 2014, Esbjerg was connected by DFDS which is now closed. Beyond Harwich International, the original second track remains in place as a through siding, but only the "up" (Manningtree-bound) line was electrified and that section to the eastern terminus Harwich Town is bidirectional.

East of Manningtree there is a triangular junction that enables trains operating to the port to reach the branch from both the north and south. The line is electrified at 25 kV AC using overhead wires and the maximum line speed is 60 mph (97 km/h).

The shortest platform is the "down" (Harwich-bound) platform at Wrabness, which is 90 yards (82 m) in length.

=== Stations ===
The following table summarises the line's six stations, their distance measured from London Liverpool Street, and estimated number of passenger entries/exits in 2018–19:

Station	Location	Local authority	Mileage	Patronage
Manningtree	Manningtree	District of Tendring	59 1/2	1,106,204
Mistley	Mistley	District of Tendring	61 1/4	75,366
Wrabness	Wrabness	District of Tendring	65	30,348
Harwich International	Harwich port and Parkeston	District of Tendring	69	110,944
Dovercourt	Dovercourt	District of Tendring	70 1/4	177,752
Harwich Town	Harwich	District of Tendring	70 3/4	151,076

== Battery trains ==
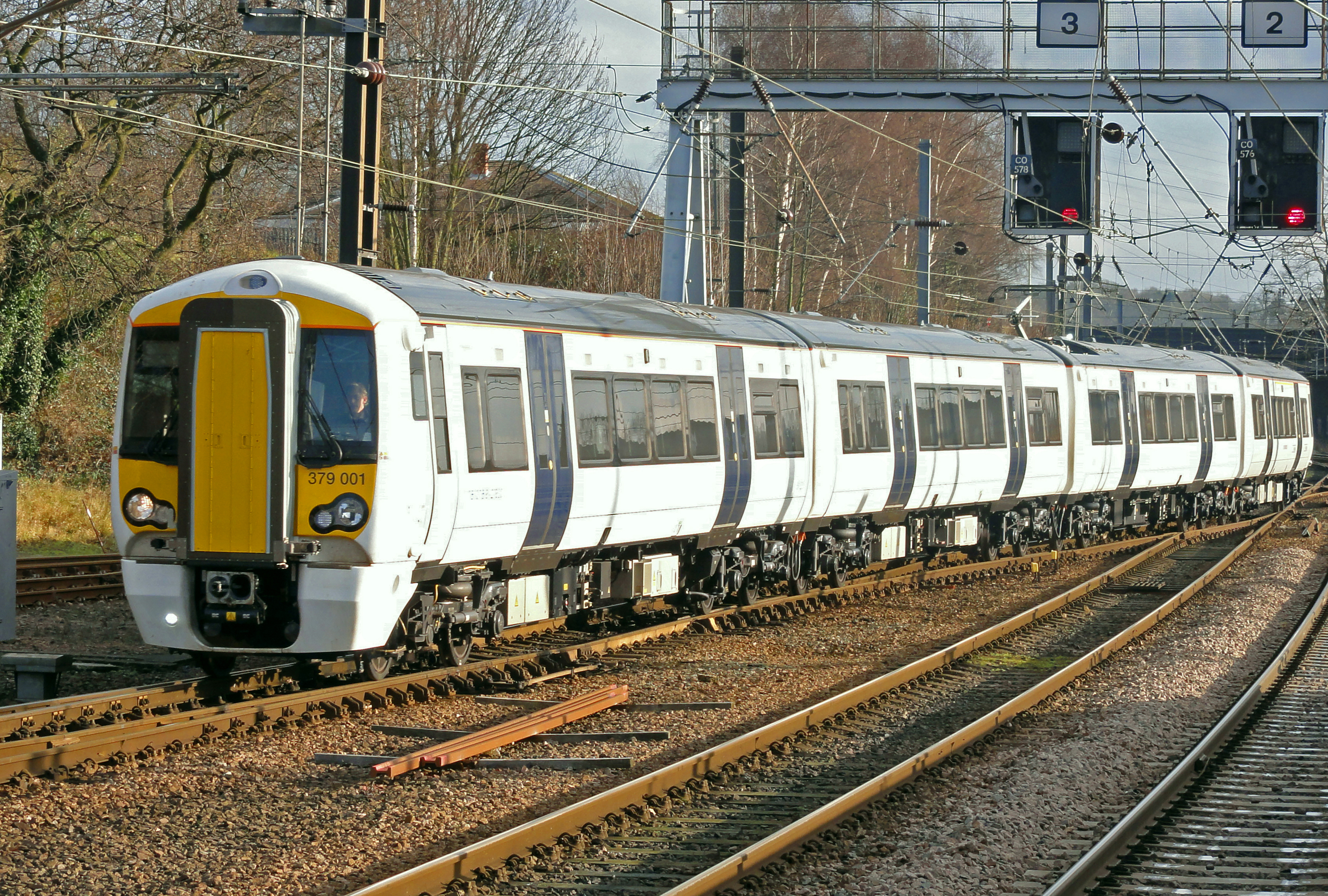
Test Electrostar train converted to run on batteries and overhead wires

In 2015, a trial of an electric overhead wire/battery train was undertaken on the line. A single Class 379 Electrostar began a passenger service after electric lithium batteries were installed. The train could travel up to 60 miles on energy stored in the batteries; it recharged the batteries via the overhead-wires when on electrified sections of the line, at stations and through brake regeneration. Network Rail refer to this prototype model and its possible future descendants as Independently Powered Electric Multiple Units (IPEMU).
