= Pilsdon =

Hamlet in Dorset, England

Coordinates: 50.7922°N 2.831°W

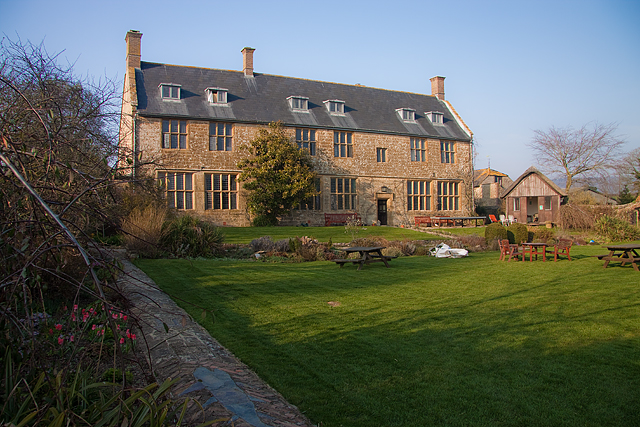
- Pilsdon Manor

- Location within Dorset
- Population: 50 (2013 estimate)
- OS grid reference: SY415995
- Unitary authority: Dorset
- Ceremonial county: Dorset
- Region: South West
- Country: England
- Sovereign state: United Kingdom
- UK Parliament: West Dorset

Pilsdon is a hamlet and civil parish in the Dorset unitary authority area of Dorset, England. Dorset County Council's 2013 mid-year estimate of the parish population is 50.

The Grade II* Pilsdon Manor House dates from the start of the 17th century. It was owned by the Wyndham family until 1958, when it became an Anglican religious community, similar in principle to the 17th-century Little Gidding community. The Pilsdon Community also has a branch at West Malling in Kent.
