= Mistley =

Village in Essex, England

Coordinates: 51.944°N 1.081°E

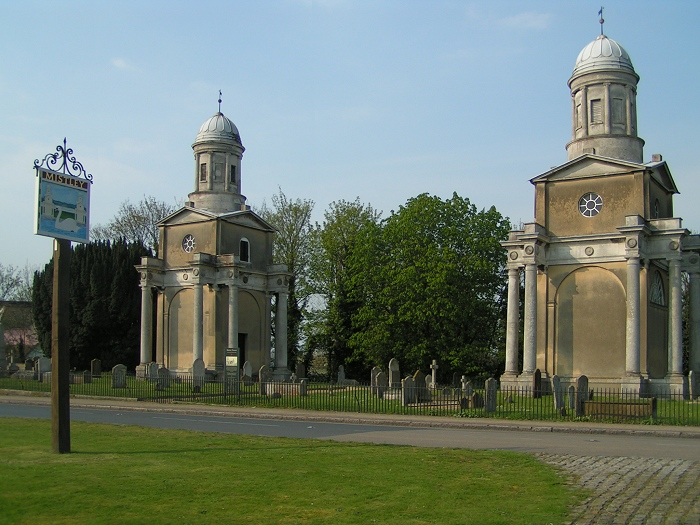
- Mistley Towers

- Location within Essex
- Population: 2,956 (Parish, 2021)
- OS grid reference: TM117318
- Civil parish: Mistley
- District: Tendring
- Shire county: Essex
- Region: East
- Country: England
- Sovereign state: United Kingdom
- Post town: Manningtree
- Postcode district: CO11
- Dialling code: 01206
- Police: Essex
- Fire: Essex
- Ambulance: East of England

Mistley is a village and civil parish in the Tendring district of northeast Essex, England. It is around 11 miles northeast of Colchester and is east of, and almost contiguous with, Manningtree. The parish consists of Mistley and New Mistley, both lying beside the Stour Estuary, Mistley Heath, about a mile to the south, and Horsley Cross at the southern end of the parish. The village is in the parliamentary constituency of Harwich and North Essex. The village has its own parish council. At the 2021 census the parish had a population of 2,956.

Mistley railway station serves Mistley on the Mayflower line.

Mistley is the location of one of five Cold War control rooms in Essex. Built in 1951, it was opened as a museum called the Secret Bunker in 1996 but closed in 2002.

== History ==
A Roman road leading from Mistley to the nearby provincial capital of Roman Britain at Camulodunum (modern Colchester) has led to the suggestion that there may have been a port in the vicinity of the modern village which served the town in the Roman period.

Mistley is the village where Matthew Hopkins (c.1620–1647), the Witchfinder General, was reputed to have lived, according to legend owning the Thorn Inn. He was buried a few hours after his death in the graveyard of the Church of St Mary. From 1920 to 1922, the Reverend Frank Buttle was rector of Mistley with Bradfield.

== Sport ==
The village is home to Mistley Cricket Club, which plays its home games in New Road, next to the church. Both Mistley Football and Rugby clubs play at Furze Hill.

== Mistley Quay ==
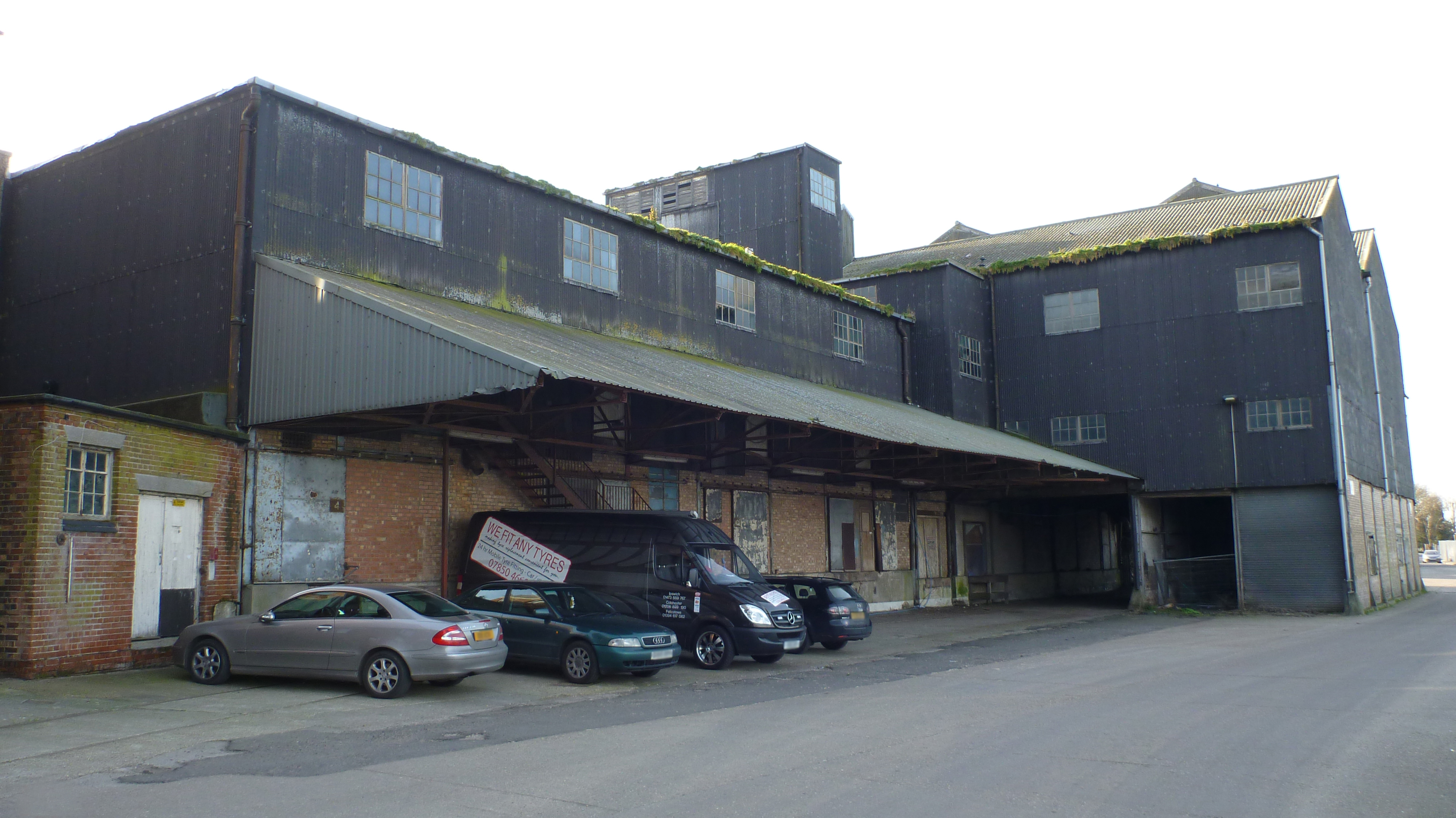
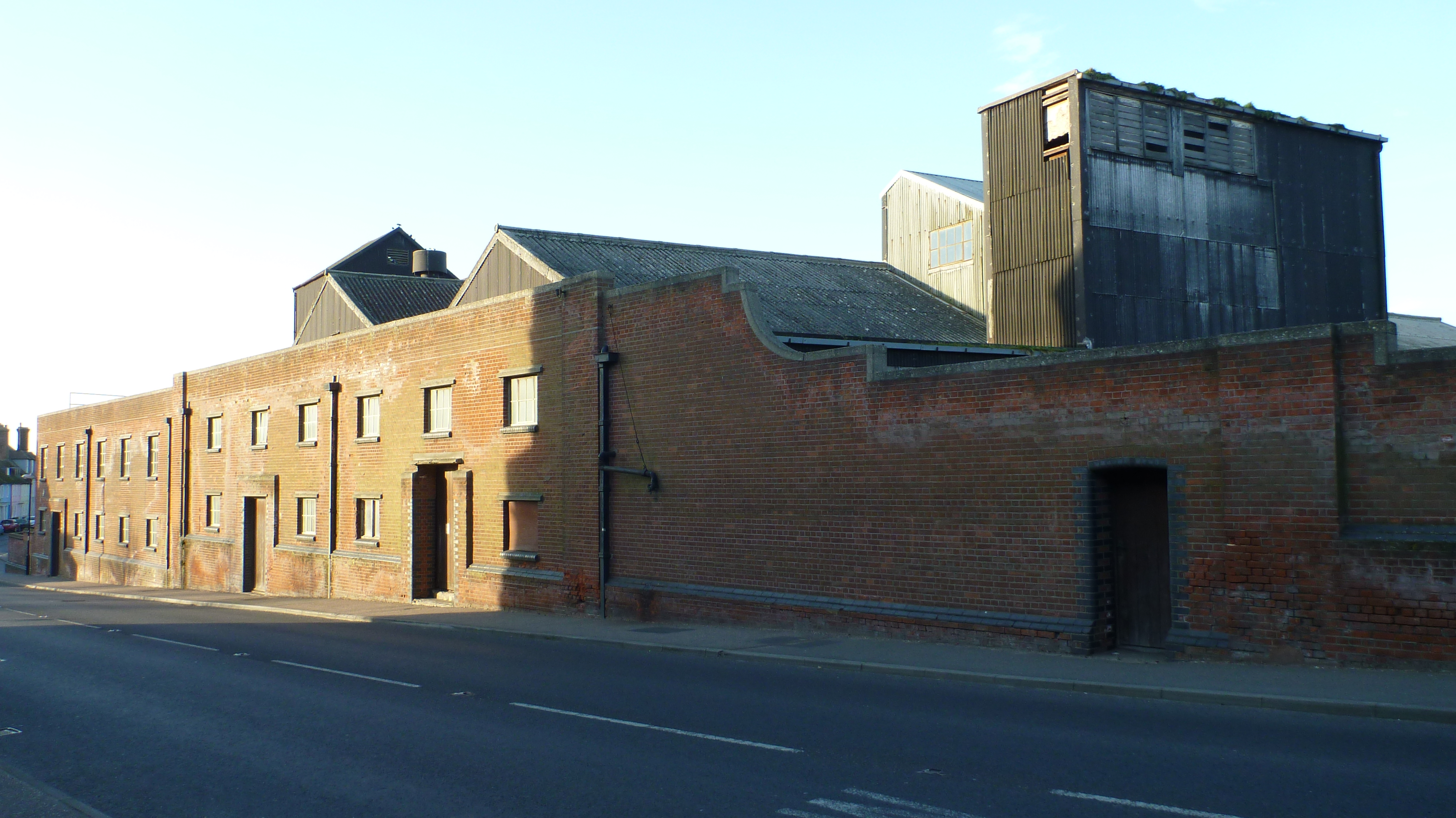
Thorn Quay Warehouse

The first quay was built around 1720, and trade went on from that quay up to Sudbury. Around 1770, the quay was enlarged by Richard Rigby and was known as Port of Mistley. Small-scale shipbuilding took place here, and a number of smaller warships were built for the Royal Navy at Mistleythorn during the 18th century.

At that time, the village of Mistley, then known as Mistleythorn, consisted of warehouses, a granary, a large malting office and new quays. There was also a medieval church, only the porch of which survives, and a new church that Rigby's father had built to the north of the village in 1735. When Rigby hatched a scheme to turn Mistley into a fashionable spa this plain, rectangular brick building was not in keeping with his grand plans. Rigby originally called in Robert Adam to design a saltwater bath by the river, but this plan was never carried out and instead the architect was put to work on the church in around 1776.

Adam's scheme was unusual in that it avoided the standard form of 18th-century parish church design, which consisted typically of a rectangle with a western tower or portico (or both) and perhaps an eastern chancel. Instead, by adding towers at the east and west ends and semi-circular porticoes on the north and south sides, Adam created a design that was symmetrical along both the long and short axes. This unusual arrangement was possibly influenced by the design of Roman tombs and the result was most unconventional. Mistley would certainly have stood out from other 18th-century churches.

Sadly for Rigby, his grand plans for the spa were unsuccessful. The main body of the church was demolished in 1870 when a new and larger church in the then fashionable Gothic Revival style was built nearby.

When the young French aristocrat Francois de La Rochefoucauld visited Mistley in 1784, he remarked on the trade of the port which he said was 'created entirely by Mr Rigby'. His tutor and companion, Maximilien de Lazowski, was more precise in his comments, saying that 'Newcastle ships bring coal which is either distributed by cart into Essex or Suffolk or carried on upriver by barge to Sudbury. The whole neighbourhood brings its corn here to be embarked or stored for the London markets and all the coastal ports. There are six ships at the quay – a fine sight.',

=== Recent history ===
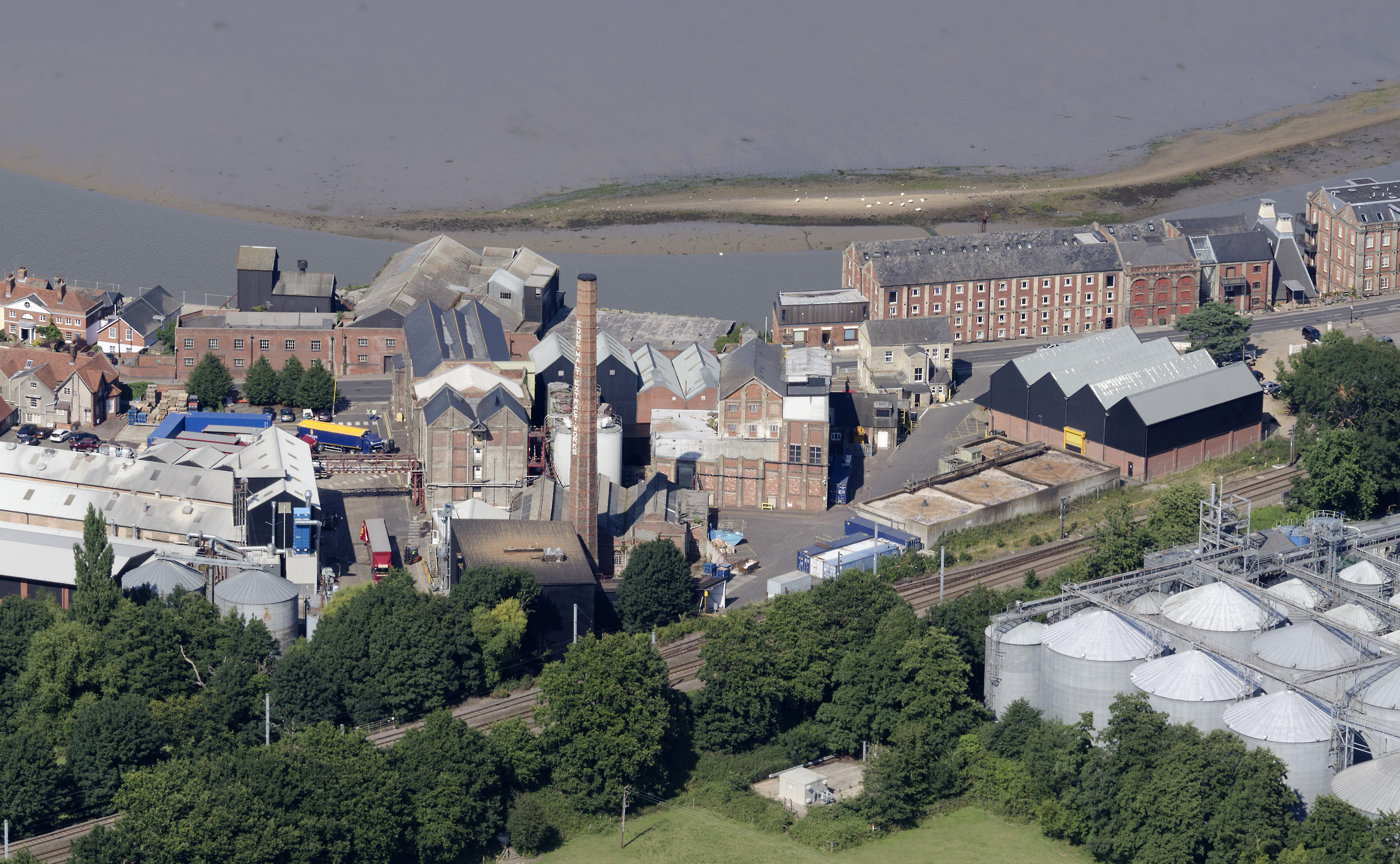
Aerial view

In September 2008, at the behest of the Health and Safety Executive, owners Trent Wharfage erected a safety fence along the quay. A protest group was formed to object to the fence, claiming that it ended 500 years of free access to the water. After locals raised £35,000 to pay for legal advice, a public enquiry was held, and Essex County Council ruled that the quay constituted a "village green". Locals hope this paves the way to the removal of the fence, on the grounds that it interferes with the public's enjoyment of the public space. As of May 2016, the decision was under appeal. In February 2021, the Supreme Court upheld the registration of the land as a village green.

Thorn Quay Warehouse, the main building of which dates from the 1950s, is the subject of a debate regarding its demolition. In November 2014, a High Court judge sided with the council, meaning that the planning permission for the demolition stood, and new homes could be built on the site.

== Notable people ==
The film director Terence Davies (1945–2023) lived in the village.
