= Pudge =

Pudge may refer to:

== People ==
- Carlton Fisk (born 1947), Hall-of-Fame Major League Baseball catcher
- Pudge Heffelfinger (1867–1954), considered the first recorded professional American football player
- Pudge MacKenzie (1909–1960), American National Hockey League player
- Iván Rodríguez (born 1971), Hall-of-Fame Major League Baseball catcher
- Pudge Wyman (1895–1961), American football player credited with several National Football League firsts, including the first touchdown

== Other uses ==
- SB Pudge the Thames sailing barge
