= SB Centaur =

British wooden Thames sailing barge

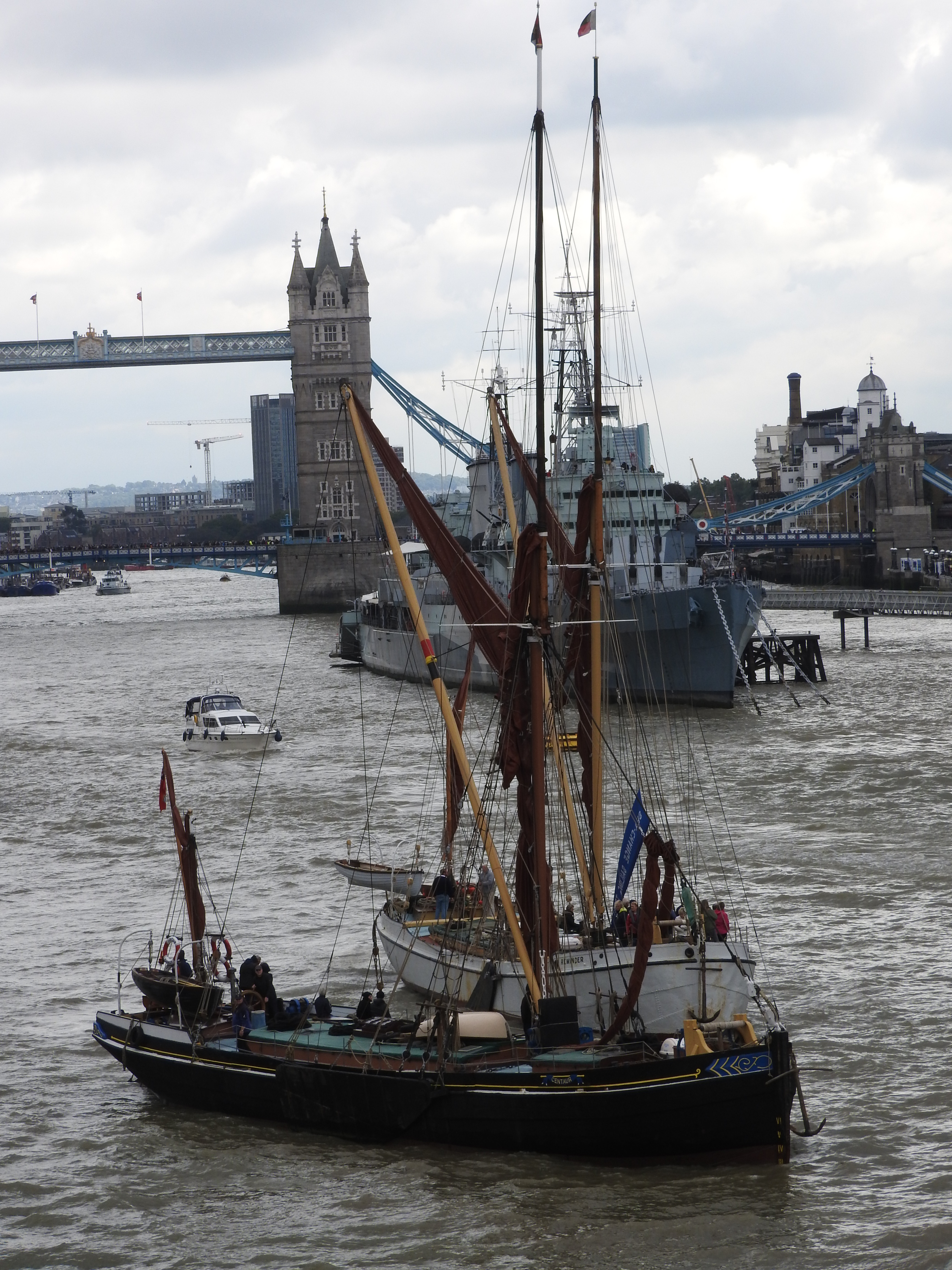
- Centaur at the Pool of London in 2017

History

United Kingdom
- Name: Centaur
- Owner: Charles Stone of Mistley (1895-1903); George Langley (1903-1906); William Rogers (1906-1911); Edward Hibbs of Brightlingsea (1911- ~1919); Ephrain “Chick” Cripps (~1919-1933); Francis & Gilders Ltd. of Colchester (1933-1951); London & Rochester Trading Company Ltd. (1951-1955); Brown & Son of Chelmsford (1955-1965); Richard Duke of Maldon (1965-1974); Thames Sailing Barge Trust, originally Thames Sailing Barge Club (1974-present)
- Builder: J & H Cann (Harwich)
- Commissioned: 1895
- Status: Private use and private charter ship
- Notes: 99460

General characteristics
- Tonnage: 61
- Length: 85.6 ft (26.1 m)
- Beam: 19.55 ft (5.96 m)
- Height: 80 ft (24 m) to top of topmast
- Draught: 6.2 ft (1.9 m) distance between the waterline and the bottom of the hull (keel)
- Propulsion: Sails and auxiliary diesel engine
- Notes: Wood

SB Centaur is a wooden Thames sailing barge, built in Harwich, Essex, England in 1895. She was used to carry various cargoes, mainly grain, for the next 60 years. During the First World War she carried food and coal to the French Channel ports. During the Second World War Centaur was damaged when sailing to assist with the Dunkirk Evacuation. She did war work for the duration of the conflict.

In 1945 she returned to the grain trade until 1955, when she was derigged. Between 1955 and 1966 she was used as a lighter until bought in 1966 by Richard Duke to re-rig as a charter barge. She was sold in 1973 to the charity Thames Barge Sailing Club (now the Thames Sailing Barge Trust). Restored between 1984 and 1993, and further in 2013, she now berths at Hythe Quay, Maldon.

== Description ==
Thames sailing barges were commercial sailing vessels once common on the River Thames in London. The flat-bottomed barges with a shallow draught and leeboards, were well adapted to the shallow, narrow waters of the Thames Estuary and East Anglia. The larger barges were seaworthy vessels, and were the largest sailing vessel to be handled by just two men. The average size was about 120 tons and they carried from 3,000–5,000 square feet (280–460 m^{2}) of canvas sail in six working sails. The mainsail was loose-footed and set up with a sprit, and was brailed to the mast when not needed. It was sheeted to a horse, as were the foresails, so needed no attention when going about (except that the foresail is held back by the mate when tacking to help the vessel come about). The topsail was usually the first sail on and last sail off, being fixed to the topmast by hoops. In the upper reaches of the rivers and constricted harbours it reached into clear air, to catch wind when the air was still at water level. When approaching a berth casting off the halliard would drop the topsail immediately, killing any forward motion. The mizzen boom was sheeted down to the long shallow rudder, which helped the vessels through the wind when tacking. The sails were made of flax; their rust colour came from the traditional waterproofing solution; a mixture of ochre, fish oil and urine. The masts were mounted in tabernacles so they could be lowered to pass under bridges without losing headway, with the anchor windlass used to lower and raise the gear via triple blocks. This took considerable effort and to aid in the process "hufflers" were often used; they would come on board to help with raising the gear (for a fee). The bowsprit, where fitted, could be "topped" – raised – where space was limited.

Sails on a Thames barge

The barges were wooden hulled, between 80–90 ft (24–27 m) long with a beam of around 20 ft (6.1 m). The hull form was flat-bottomed with a degree of flare to the sides and plumb ends. To prevent unwanted (sideways) passage to the lee, there was a massive pivoted, retractable, winch operated leeboard on each side. On the Centaur each weighed 1.5 long tons (1.5 t). The stern was a transom, fitted with a large rudder. The hull was mainly a hold with two small living areas in the bow and stern, and access was through two large hatchways, the smaller before the main mast and a much larger aperture behind. These barges required no ballast. No auxiliary power was used originally but many barges were fitted with engines in later years. When no wharf was available, the barge could use the ebbing tide to stand on the mud close to shore, and offload its cargo into carts. A barge with no topsail – or top mast – sailing stumpy-rigged required a smaller crew. With a shallow draught, they could penetrate deep into the back waters. Not needing ballast reduced their turn-round time. They could be berthed on a flat mud bank, against a camp-shed, on a barge bed or in a held tide dock.

In good conditions, sailing barges could attain speeds of over 12 knots (22 km/h; 14 mph), and their leeboards allowed them to be highly effective windward performers. The unusual spritsail rig allowed any combination of sails to be set: even the topsail on its own could be effective in some conditions.

=== Uses ===
Thames sailing barges were the heavy goods vehicles of their time, moving 150 long tons (170 short tons) of loose cargo at a time from outside the capital to the city. They brought in coal for the furnaces, bricks to construct mills and houses, and hay for the horses. Barges were used to transport rubbish from various cities out to the brickfields where it was used as fuel; it was only for the last mile of the trip to the brickfields that road transport had to be used. In 1900 there were over 2,000 privately owned Thames sailing barges in operation.

== History ==
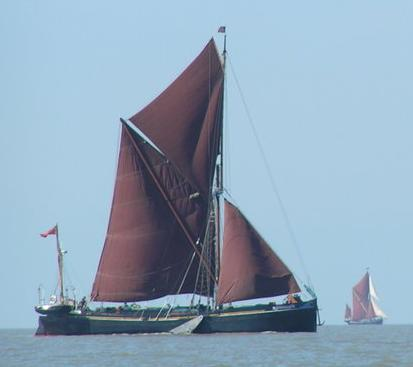
Thames sailing barges, with typical red-brown sails, in the East Swin (Note: East Swin is a deep channel to the east of Foulness Point, Essex: Admiralty Chart SC5606, April 2004)

=== Early life ===
SB Centaur, wood built, probably pitch pine on oak, was constructed for Charles Stone of Mistley to be used for the coastal trade. She was large compared with the average sailing barge and had a "generous sheer and shapely transom" making her more seaworthy. She was 85.6 ft (26.1 m) long, with a beam of 19.55 ft (5.96 m) and a draught of 6.2 ft (1.9 m). Her capacity was 61 long tons (68 short tons). When loaded she could have as little as 9 inches (23 cm) freeboard, and hurried loading meant that she frequently listed. Construction took six weeks and she was launched on 15 February 1895 by John and Herbert Cann at the Bathside yard, Gashouse Creek, Harwich. Her first master was James Stone, and she had a crew of two: a mate and a boy. There was another Thames sailing barge named Centaur, based in Rochester and built in 1899. She sank in 1930 after colliding with Aspbodel. Records referring to "SB Centaur" are not always clear as to which is meant.

In 1898 Centaur won the Harwich Barge Race. In 1899 an "SB Centaur", probably her Rochester-based namesake, won the Medway Barge Race, passing over the finishing line at Upnor 2 1/2 minutes ahead of second placed SB Giralda. The Mistley barges worked the ports of north east France, Belgium and the Netherlands, from most of the English ports between Southampton and Goole. There are records of her carrying wheat, hydrochloric acid, sugar, linseed oil and raw linseed. In April 1902 her steering gear was damaged while sailing from Shoreham and she was towed into Newhaven. In January 1905 she had to be towed into Portland. Both anchors were lost off the Netherlands in December 1906.

Her sailing qualities have been described as:

Centaur was a satisfying barge to sail. She went well to windward and was quite handy in narrow waters. Until the last year or two of her trading days, unlike today, she carried a bowsprit. As a result she was better balanced, needing very little helm. She sailed best on the sheet, with a freeish sprit. On the bowsprit, she could carry both a jib and a topmast staysail, but it was usual only to set the former. She-would carry full sail (i.e. without the staysail) in a Force 5 wind, although in associated sea conditions offshore the skipper would be looking for shelter if deep-laden. When reducing sail due to weather the jib came in first, followed by the topsail and then if necessary the first few cloths of the mainsail. A Force 6 wind was generally considered to be the overall limiting condition.

— Peter Thomson

=== World War I ===
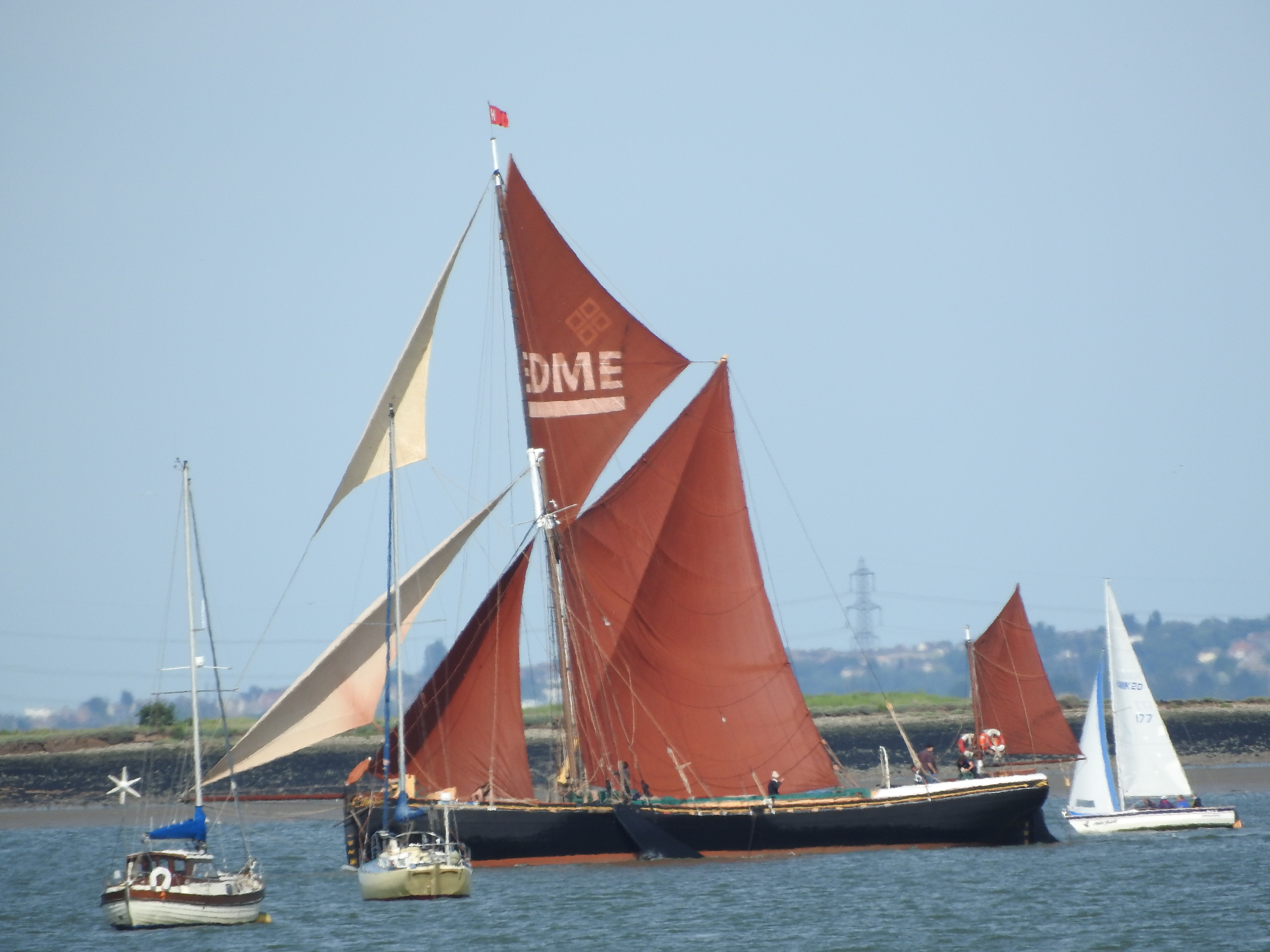
SB Edme, a similar barge to Centaur, under full sail (Note: The staysail and the jib are white, not red-brown, because they were stowed below deck and so did not require the ultra-violet protection provided by adding ochre to the waterproofing solution which results in the distinctive colour of the other sails.)

In the First World War, SB Centaur joined her sister barges taking foodstuffs and large quantities of coal, coke, and pitch to the French ports of Le Treport, Calais and Boulogne-sur-Mer. Commonly there were 180 barges discharging at Le Treport. They sailed over enemy mines due to their shallow draught, and were too small to attract enemy U-boats. These were profitable runs as carriage was charged at £6 a ton. On one crossing, the date is not recorded, in thick fog, the Centaur was struck amidships by a coastal motor boat (CMB), a small, motorised, military vessel, which mounted her deck and settled on her main hatch. Both boats were undamaged and the Centaur returned home and safely unloaded both the CMB and her cargo.

=== Inter-war years ===
After the war, Centaur resumed the coastal trade. She made a number of voyages to France and Belgium carrying pitch and coal. Ephraim Cripps was her skipper for twenty years and kept records of each voyage. Colchester was her main port from 1928 to 1930, and she worked the East Anglian coast. In 1933 she joined Francis and Gilders Ltd which managed a large fleet of sailing barges out of Colchester, transporting grain from Norfolk, Suffolk and Essex into London.

=== World War II ===
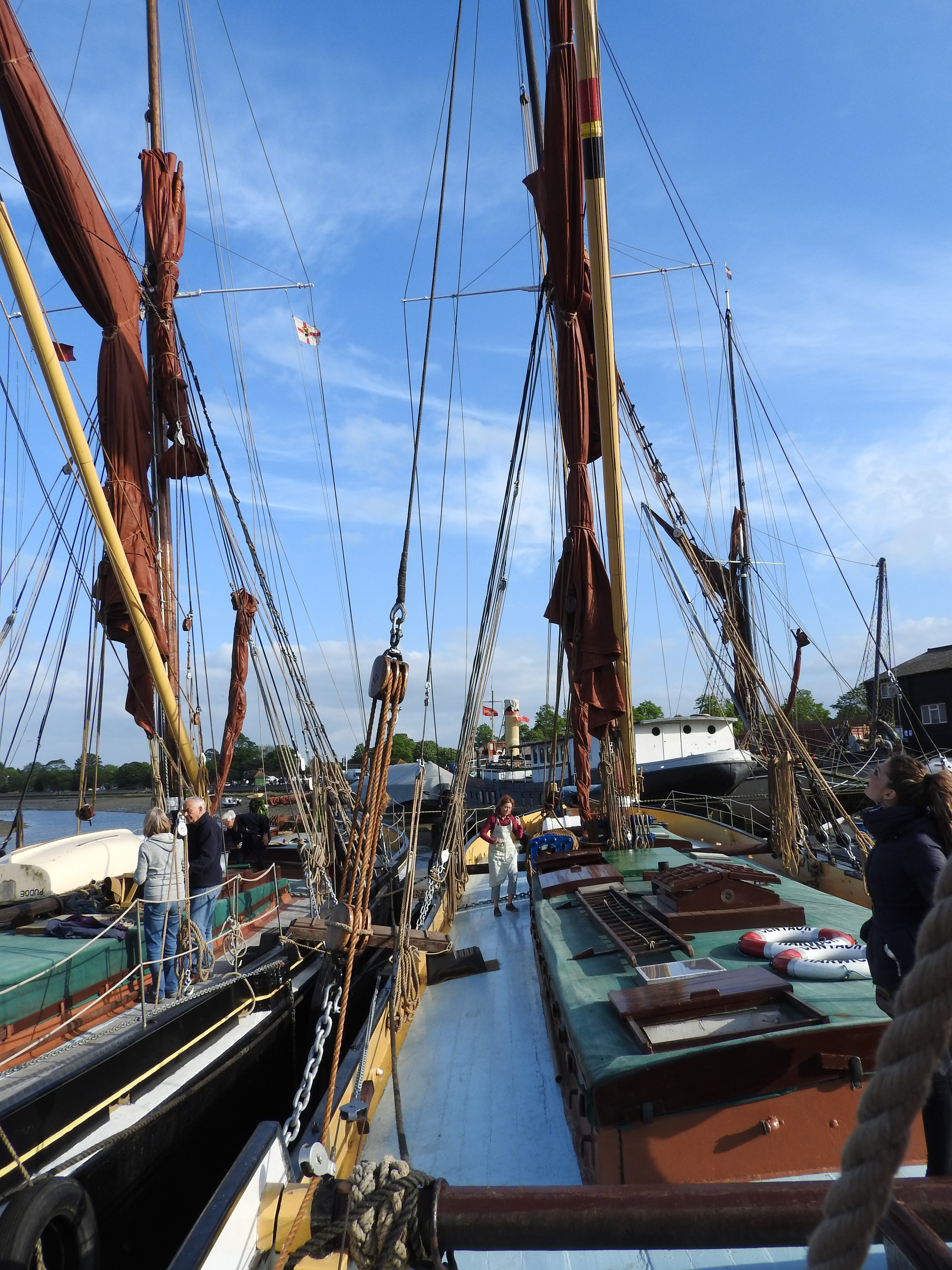
SB Centaur in 2017 at Hythe Quay, Maldon

The first major civilian maritime event of the Second World War was the Dunkirk evacuation where hundreds of small ships rescued allied soldiers from the beaches. Like many of the sailing barge fleet Centaur sailed down to the assembly point at Dover, where she collided with a tug and so was unable to make the crossing. The rest of the conflict was spent under government charter, carrying much the same cargos as she always had around the south and east coasts of England.

=== Post-war ===
After the war Centaur returned to working the grain trade. In January 1952, in force 6–7 winds with seas breaking across her hatches, her rudder broke and she was towed into Colne by the SB Saxon. Francis and Gilders Ltd were the last "seeker barges", barges that sought any cargo; the London and Rochester Trading Company merged with them in 1951. The new owners were intent on selling on these barges, and Centaur took her last cargo in 1955. During her last year in the carrying trade, as well as grain she transported timber, sugar beet, ballast, cement and oil drums. Centaur and the other three remaining working sailing barges, George Smeed, Kitty and Mirosa were deregistered and disposed of to Brown & Son of Chelmsford. There they were de-masted, de-registered and used as timber lighters. Between 1955 and 1966 she was used as a lighter to tranship timber from ships in the Blackwater estuary to canal lighters headed for Chelmsford.

In 1966 she was purchased by Richard Duke and re-rigged as a charter barge with four four-berth cabins. In 1968 she was class winner at the Blackwater Sailing Barge Match. She was sold in 1973 to the Thames Barge Sailing Club (now the Thames Sailing Barge Trust), a registered charity. She was restored between 1974 and 1993, with most frames and planks replaced and a new auxiliary motor, a Bedford six-cylinder truck engine fitted with a marine gearbox, installed. In 1993 she won the Inter-match Trophy. In 1995 the sacrificial planking was replaced in iroko and opeipi. In 2013 a Heritage Lottery Fund grant of £100,000 was obtained which contributed to further restoration work, including redoubling the bottom timbers. She now berths at Hythe Quay, Maldon and as of 2018 is available for charter during the summer months. She is still traditionally rigged, as she was in 1895, currently with 2,600 square feet (240 m^{2}) of sail.

== Owners ==
- 1895 - Charles Stone.
- c. 1900 - Dolly Rogers.
- 1911 - Ted Hibbs.
- 1915 - John Sawyer.
- 1933 - Francis & Gilders.
- 1951 - London and Rochester Trading Company.
- 1955 - Brown & Co.; derigged for use as a timber lighter.
- 1965 - Richard Duke Used as a charter barge.
- 1973 - Thames Barge Sailing Club, now the Thames Sailing Barge Trust.

The dates are when Centaur came into ownership of its various owners.

== See also ==
- SB Pudge
