= Claire Barratt =

Industrial archaeologist, steam engineer and television presenter

Claire Barratt (born 1974) is an English industrial archaeologist, steam engineer and television presenter.

== Career ==
Barratt studied civil engineering at the University of Portsmouth, and whilst doing so, became more interested in mechanical engineering.

On graduation she worked at the Chiltern Open Air Museum, the Royal Armouries and the British Engineerium, where she remains a consultant engineer. It was from here that her television career was launched when she appeared on Channel 4's Salvage Squad – a programme about restoring historical machinery – first as a participant, later as co-presenter. Whilst filming, she completed a master's degree in Conservation of Industrial Heritage and won the Association for Industrial Archaeology Student Fieldwork Award.

Presently a freelance consultant industrial archaeologist, Barratt has restored and run many different vehicles, and is currently restoring a watermill in Cornwall. She is a member of Subterranea Britannica, a society which studies and records man-made underground sites.

== Personal life ==
Barratt is married to a fellow car enthusiast and has two daughters.

== Filmography ==
- Salvage Squad, Channel 4, 2002–2004
- The History Detectives, BBC, 2007
- Rory McGrath's Best of British Engineering, Series Engineer, Discovery, 2006
- The Biggest Little Railway in the World, Channel 4, 2018
- Abandoned Places
