= Angele Aline =

French ship, launched 1921

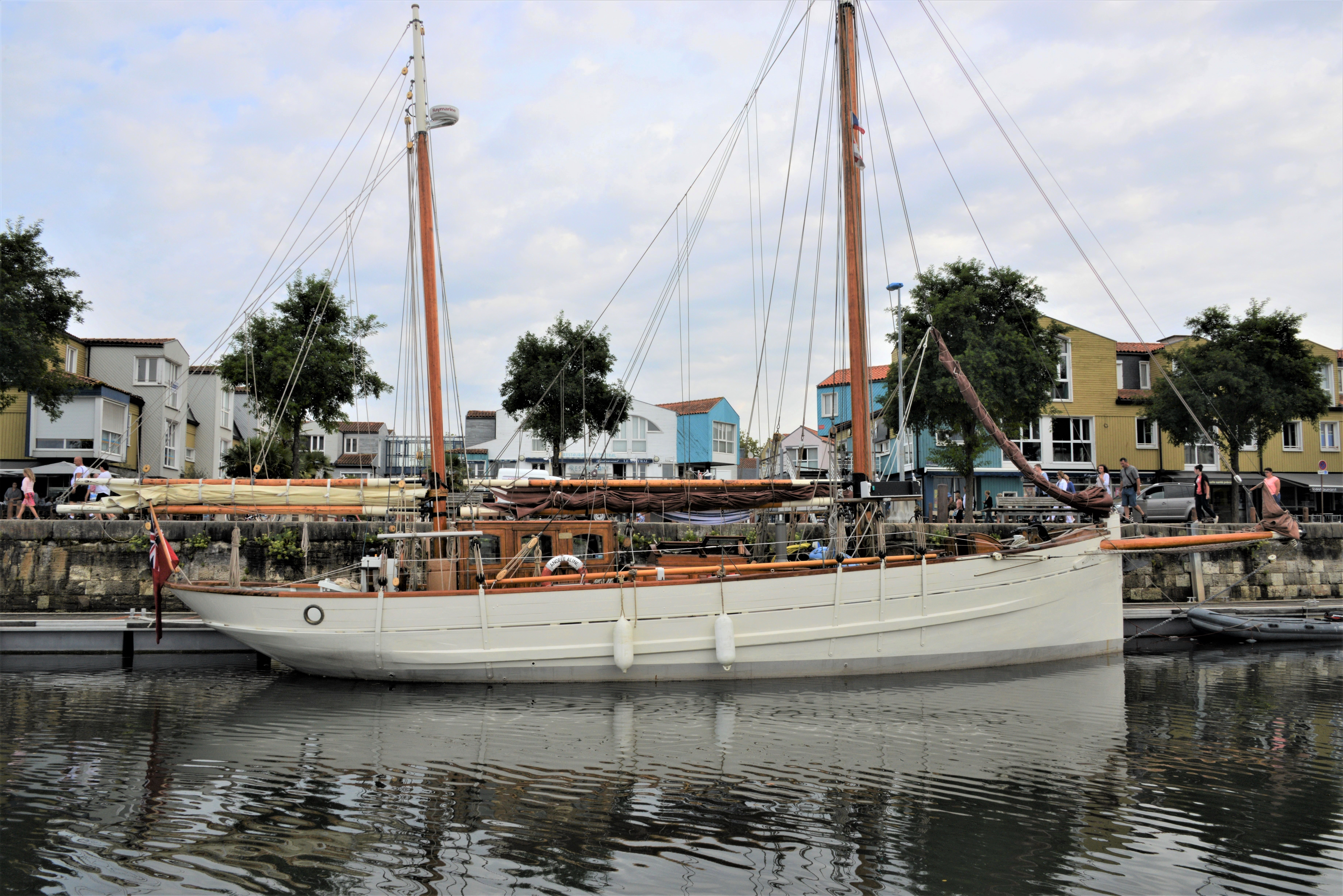
Angele Aline, in 2015

Angele Aline is a sailing trawler launched in Fécamp, France, on 3 November 1921.

The ship is one of the 700 little ships of Dunkirk, which took part in Operation Dynamo in 1940. In 2010, she took part in the 70th anniversary return to Dunkirk.
