= Massey Shaw =

Former London Fire Brigade fireboat

Coordinates: 51.501088°N 0.011559°W

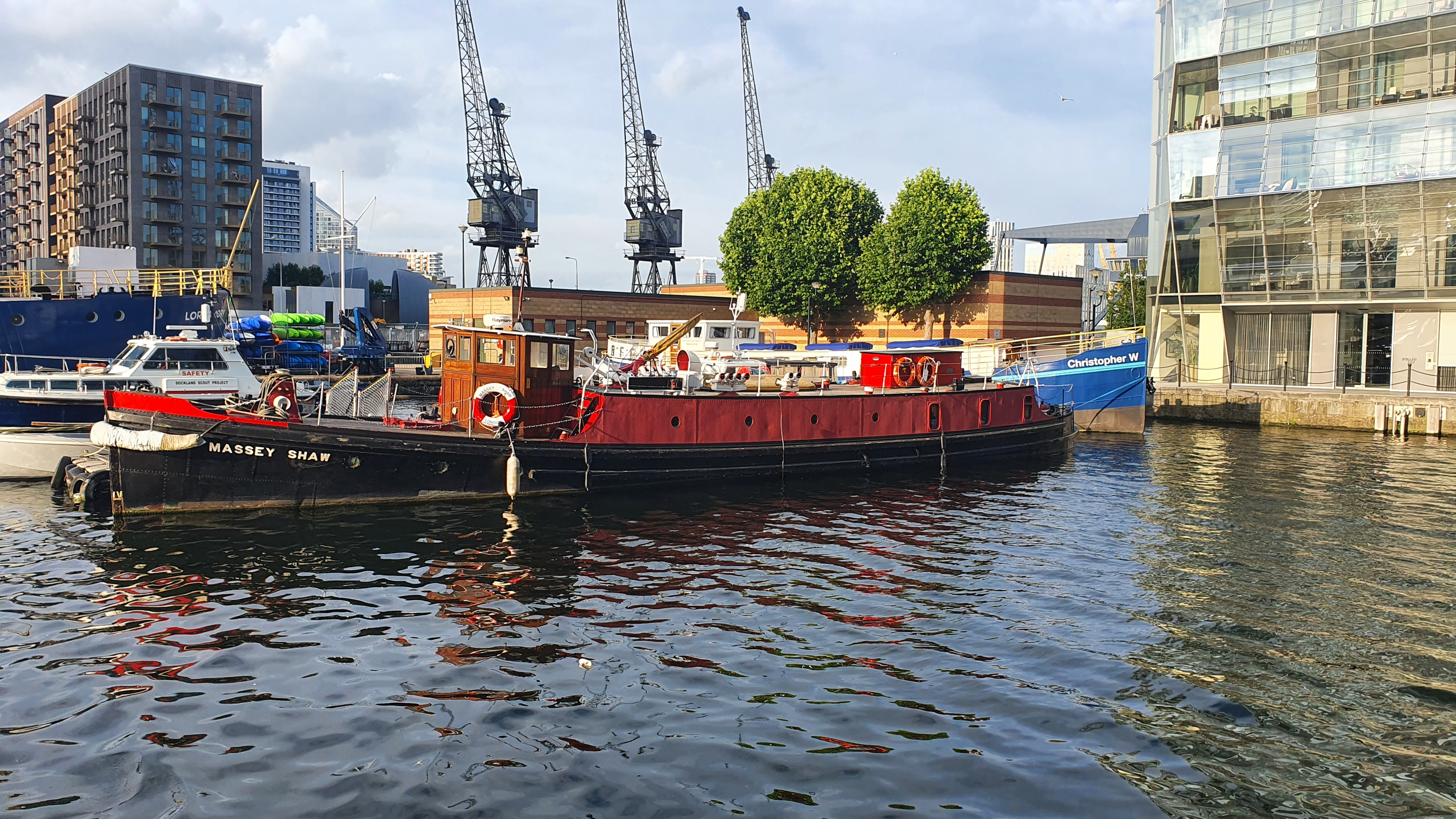
- Massey Shaw in South Dock, Isle of Dogs, London (July 2021)

History

United Kingdom
- Name: Massey Shaw
- Namesake: Eyre Massey Shaw
- Owner: The Massey Shaw and Marine Vessels Preservation Society Limited
- Operator: London Fire Brigade
- Builder: J. Samuel White, Cowes, Isle of Wight
- Cost: £18,000
- Launched: 1935
- In service: 1935
- Out of service: 1971
- Home port: London
- Status: Museum ship

General characteristics
- Type: Fire float
- Tonnage: 50.54 GT
- Length: 78 ft (24 m) o/a
- Beam: 13 ft 9 in (4.19 m)
- Draught: 3 ft 9 in (1.14 m)
- Decks: Teak
- Installed power: 1 × Russell Newbery 2-cylinder Type D2 diesel engine
- Propulsion: 2 × 165 bhp (123 kW) 8-cylinder Gleniffer DC8 diesel engines
- Speed: 12 knots (22 km/h; 14 mph)
- Capacity: 2 × Merryweather & Sons 4-stage 8-inch centrifugal fire pumps, each rated at 1,500 gallons (6,819 L) per minute; 1 × 3-inch (76 mm) fire monitor

Massey Shaw is a former London Fire Brigade fireboat, named after the first Chief Officer of the Metropolitan Fire Brigade, Captain Sir Eyre Massey Shaw. Built in 1935 and decommissioned in 1971, the vessel was restored in the early 21st century and is moored in London's West India Docks.

== Ship history ==
Massey Shaw was built in 1935 by the J. Samuel White company at Cowes, Isle of Wight. She was built to a London County Council design, and cost around £18,000 to build. The vessel was named after Eyre Massey Shaw, a former chief of the London Fire Brigade.

During the Second World War, Massey Shaw, along with a volunteer crew of firemen, formed part of the flotilla of small vessels which were sent to Dunkirk to help evacuate British troops from the beaches. Massey Shaw made three trips to the beaches and rescued over 500 troops, most by ferrying them to a larger ship standing offshore. She also rescued some 30 men from a French ship mined off Margate.

Massey Shaw served throughout the remainder of the War as a fireboat on the Thames. During the Blitz, the vessel pumped vast quantities of water from the Thames to fight fires all along the Thames waterfront.

She can be seen in the 1958 film 'Dunkirk' starring John Mills and Richard Attenborough. Massey Shaw remained in service as a Thames fireboat until 1971 when she was decommissioned. In 1980 Philip Wray, Dick Helyer, and several other concerned individuals found the Massey Shaw abandoned in St Katharine Docks. They founded "The Massey Shaw Fireboat Society" and began to lobby the Fire Authority to save this historic vessel, eventually being granted a 50-year lease.

=== Restoration ===
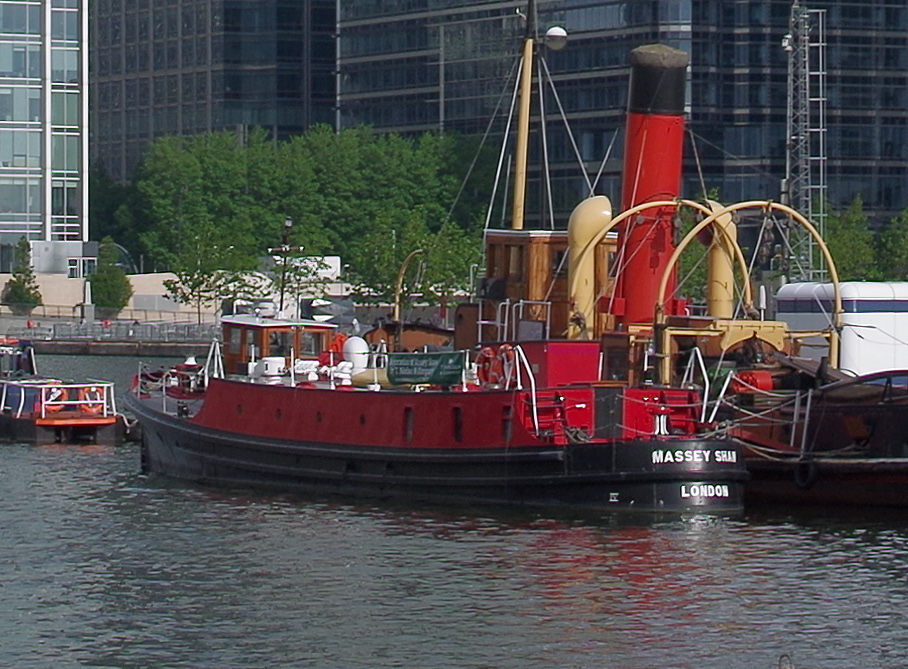
Massey Shaw, 2014

The historic vessel was saved from dereliction by a group of enthusiasts who restored her and a successful Heritage Lottery Grant in 2008. The vessel has been completely restored in Gloucester dock by a professional team of boat builders.

The society had planned to return Massey to the River Thames in May 2013 by sailing her around the south coast of the UK, stopping off at various ports on the way, including Cowes, Isle of Wight where the vessel was built in 1935. However, she returned to London by road in 2013 where final stages of the restoration were completed.

As of 2021, Massey Shaw is moored at the eastern end of the West India Docks South Dock on the Isle of Dogs in London.

== See also ==
- Salvage Squad, Massey Shaw's restoration was the subject of two episodes of this TV programme.
- Fireboat
