= Salvage Squad =

British television series

The Salvage Squad logo from Series 3

Salvage Squad is a British television programme, in which the "Salvage Squad" faced the challenge of restoring an item of classic machinery. The task was usually against a tight deadline, such as a public unveiling at a vehicle rally. In addition to vintage cars, lorries, railway engines, boats and aircraft, the challenges included the resurrection of a Hampshire water mill and a set of fairground gallopers.

The "Salvage Squad" comprised a presenter, either Lee Hurst or Suggs, and a team of restoration experts: Claire Barratt, Axel Cleghorn and Jerry Thurston. The team was also supplemented on each job by appropriate specialist craftsmen. The role of the presenter was mainly to narrate progress and to research the history of the item being restored, although they were sometimes roped into the restoration work itself.

The programmes included archive footage of similar machines in action, explanations of the characteristic technologies used, descriptions of the restoration techniques, and interviews with people historically associated with the items during their commercial life.

Produced by Wall to Wall, the three series of one-hour programmes were originally broadcast on Channel 4 during 2002, 2003 and 2004 and have since been re-broadcast on the Discovery Channel, the History Channel and Quest (TV channel).

== Series 1 ==
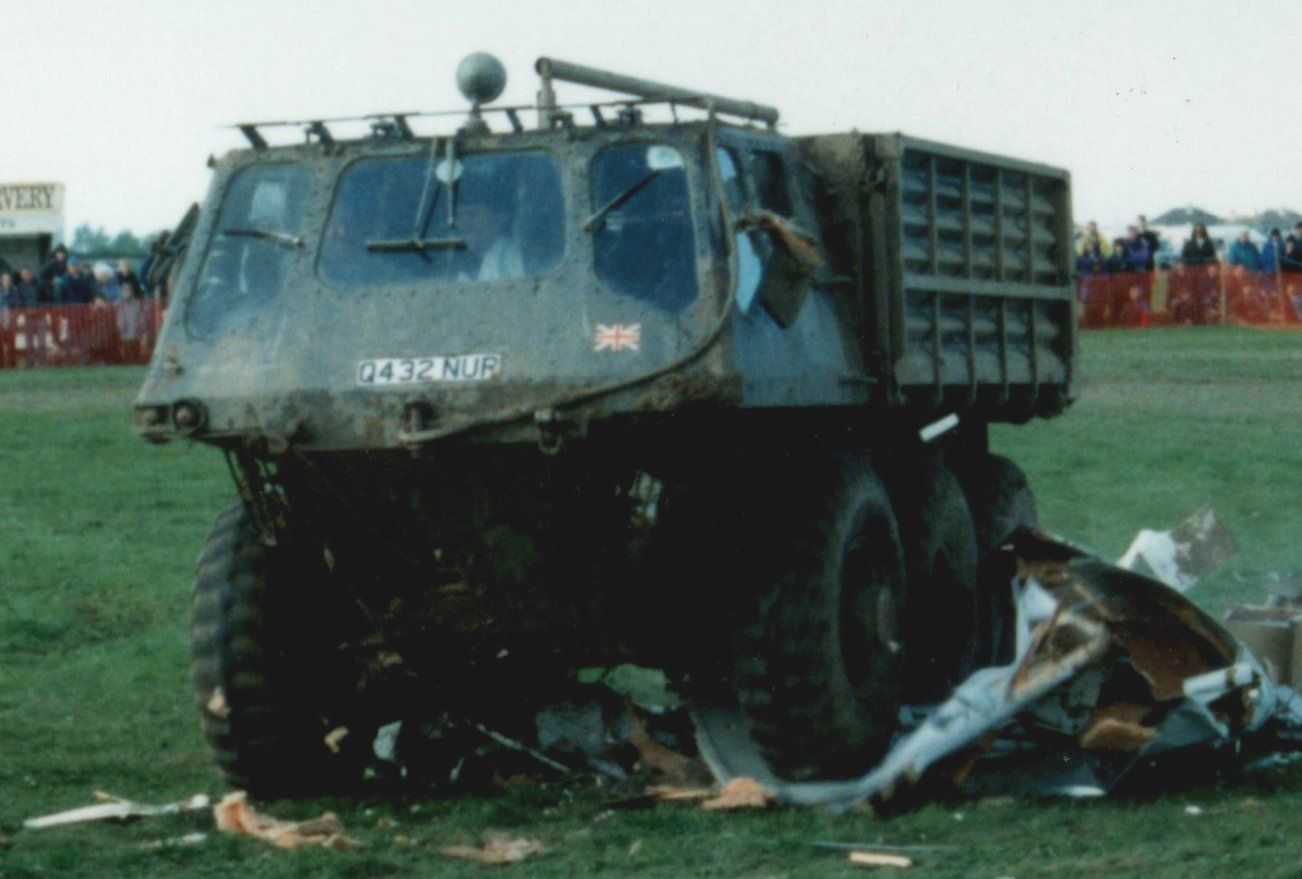
An Alvis Stalwart (FV620) amphibious military truck, like the one restored in Series 1.

First broadcast in 2002.

Salvage Squad: Lee Hurst, Claire Barratt, Axel Cleghorn, Jerry Thurston

1. Steamroller
2. Centurion Tank
3. Bristol 407
4. Gyroplane
5. Steamboat
6. Fire engine
7. Alvis Stalwart (FV620) or 'Stolly' (Restoration report)
  Amphibious military supply truck, dating from 1968.
  The main aim of this project was to restore the Stolly's amphibious capabilities. This involved seeking out a set of 'swimming gear' – routinely removed from these vehicles by the Army to save weight – and to install new seals on the huge cargo doors. The final test was to drive the vehicle down a slipway at 20 mph into a river, to see if it would float. Fortunately for all concerned, it did.
8. Racing car (Restoration report)
  Lola T142, Formula 5000, racing car dating from 1969: the winning car from the 1969 Madrid Grand Prix.
9. Thames sailing barge
10. de Havilland Gipsy Moth

== Series 2 ==
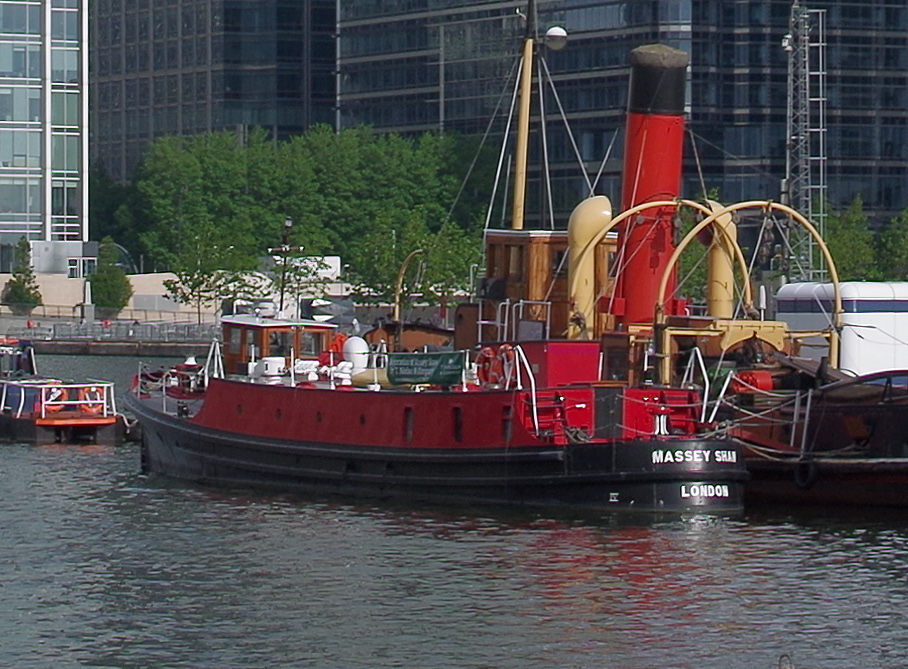
The Massey Shaw Fireboat

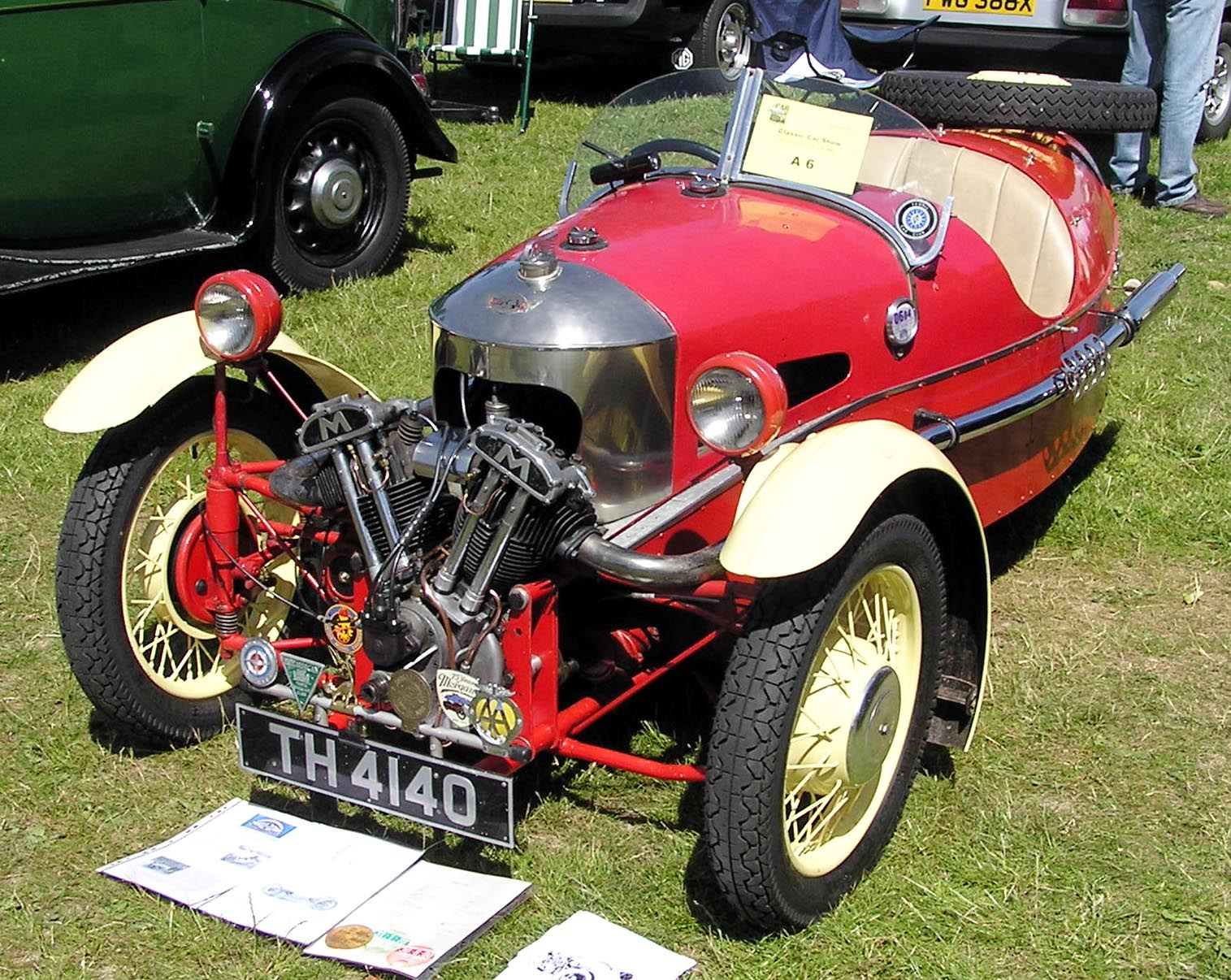
A Morgan Super Sports like the one featured in series 2

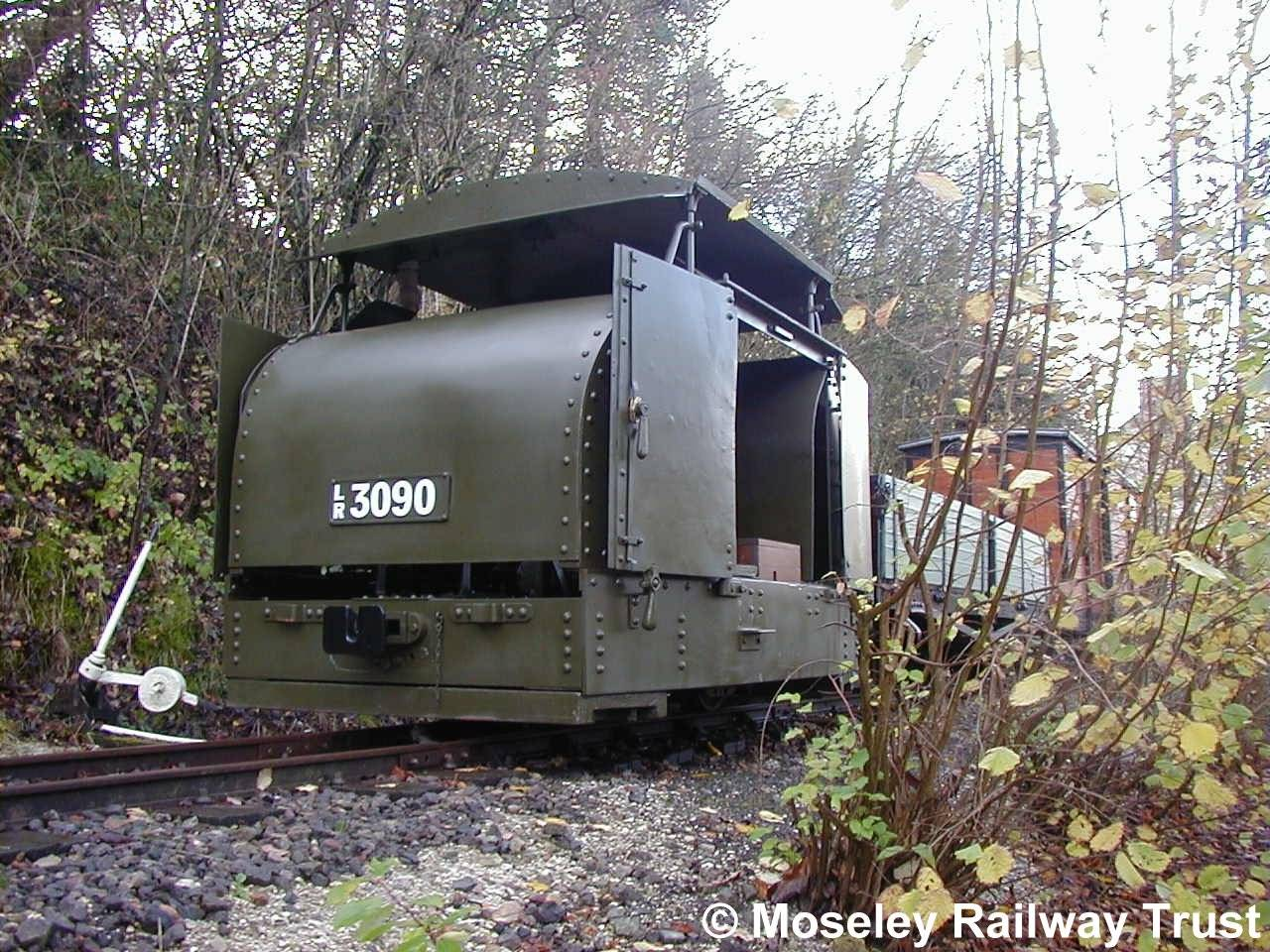
This photograph in France was taken during the Series 2 filming of the restoration of the First World War Armoured SImplex locomotive

First broadcast in 2003.

Salvage Squad: Suggs, Claire Barratt, Axel Cleghorn, Jerry Thurston

1. Watermill
2. Steam-powered gallopers (Restoration report)
  in the Victorian fairground at Blists Hill
3. Massey Shaw Fireboat
4. Shelvoke and Drewry 'PN' Revopak (extra-short wheelbase) dustcart (See: Preserved Shelvoke and Drewry Vehicles#SCY 786 X)
5. Simplex armoured narrow gauge railway locomotive
6. Steam car
7. Blackpool "Coronation" tram car no. 304 (Restoration report)
  This was a 'special' restoration, to celebrate the Queen's Golden Jubilee, and was one of the most ambitious. The aim was to restore the tram in time for its 50th birthday.
8. Morgan Super Sports car
9. Ruston-Bucyrus 10RB 'crane' – restored as a drag line excavator
10. Ploughing engine (or 'steam plough') "Margaret"(Restoration report)

== Series 3 ==
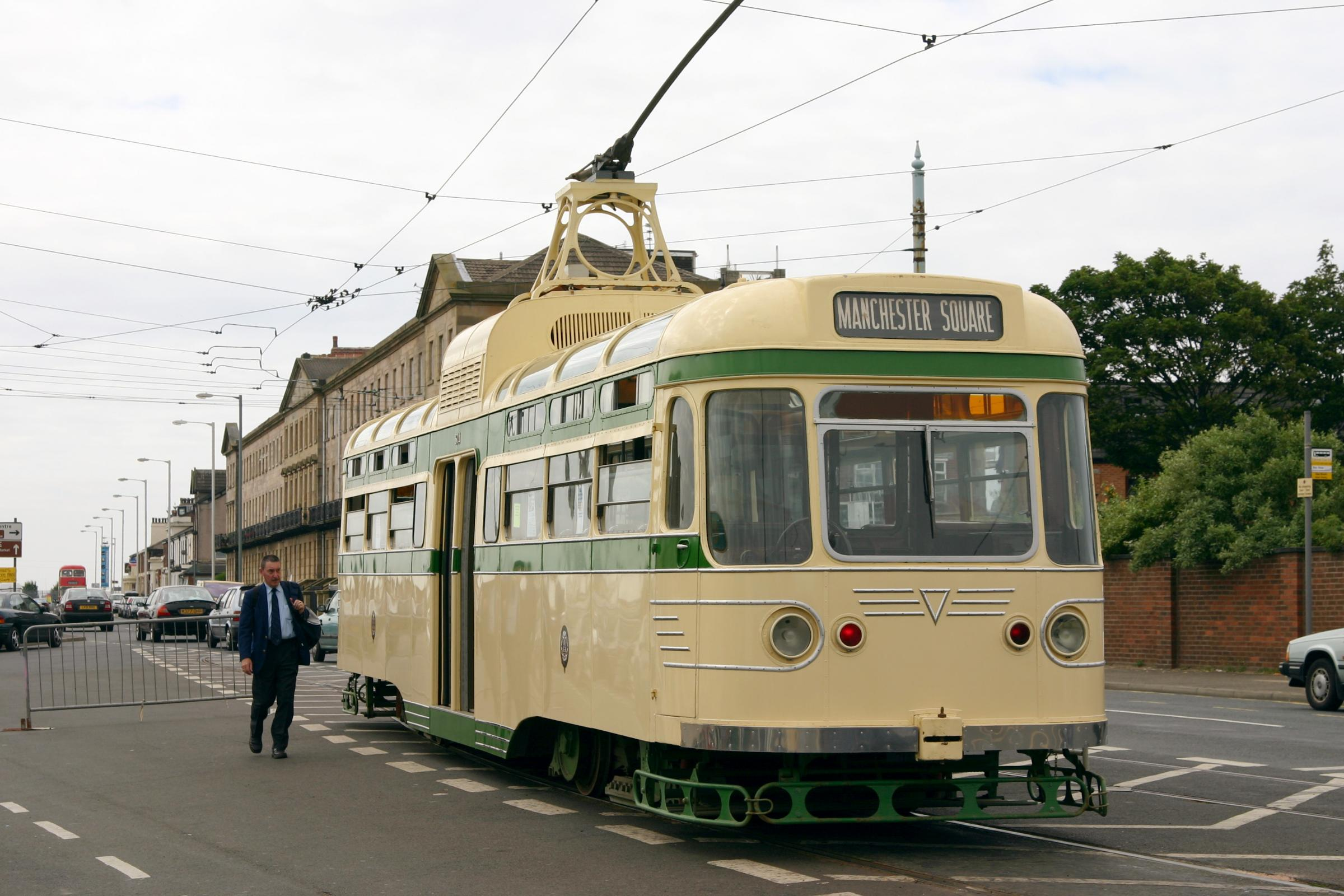
Series 2 & 3: "Coronation" tram number 304

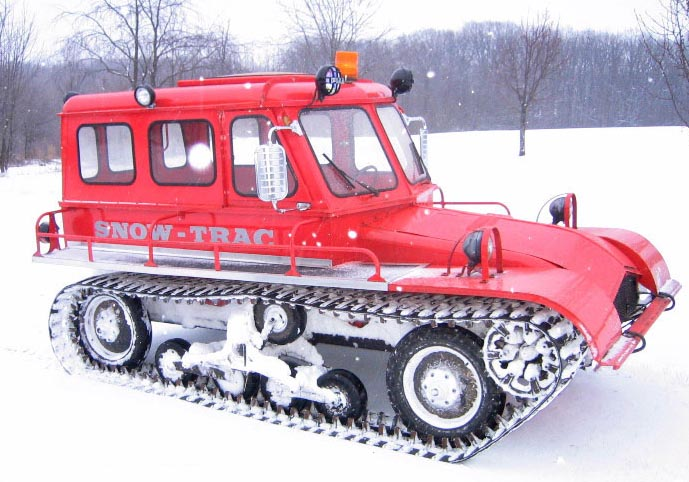
A Snow Trac, similar to this, was restored in Series 3.

First broadcast in 2004.

Salvage Squad: Suggs, Claire Barratt

This series had a distinctly different 'feel' to the first two. Rather than having a team of three to do the bulk of the restoration, this series featured just Claire coordinating the work undertaken by a number of specialist restorers, often herself having a go at some of the handiwork.

In addition to the usual ten restoration candidates, this series included two 're-visits' to projects from the second series that had not been entirely successful first time round.

1. Amphicar – (Restoration report) The Amphicar featured was not finished (the mechanical restoration was incomplete) and so the car was not used. It was sold in May 2011,http://www.amphicars.com/ac4sal.htm
2. Massey Harris 780 combine harvester
3. Scammell Scarab – (Restoration report)
4. Model T Ford
5. WW2 Biber submarine
6. 1936 Grafton steam crane
  located at Blists Hill Victorian Museum
7. Skima 12 hovercraft – (Restoration report)
8. 1931 Sentinel steam lorry
9. Snow Trac
10. M10 Tank Destroyer
11. Blackpool "Coronation" tram car no. 304 – revisited (Restoration report)
  The original restoration did not fully achieve the desired results. This programme showed the original restoration in an edited form, with the new content focussing on the re-engineering of the VAMBAC control unit.
12. Massey Shaw Fireboat – revisited: first visit was in Series 2
