= Tamzine =

1937 fishing boat

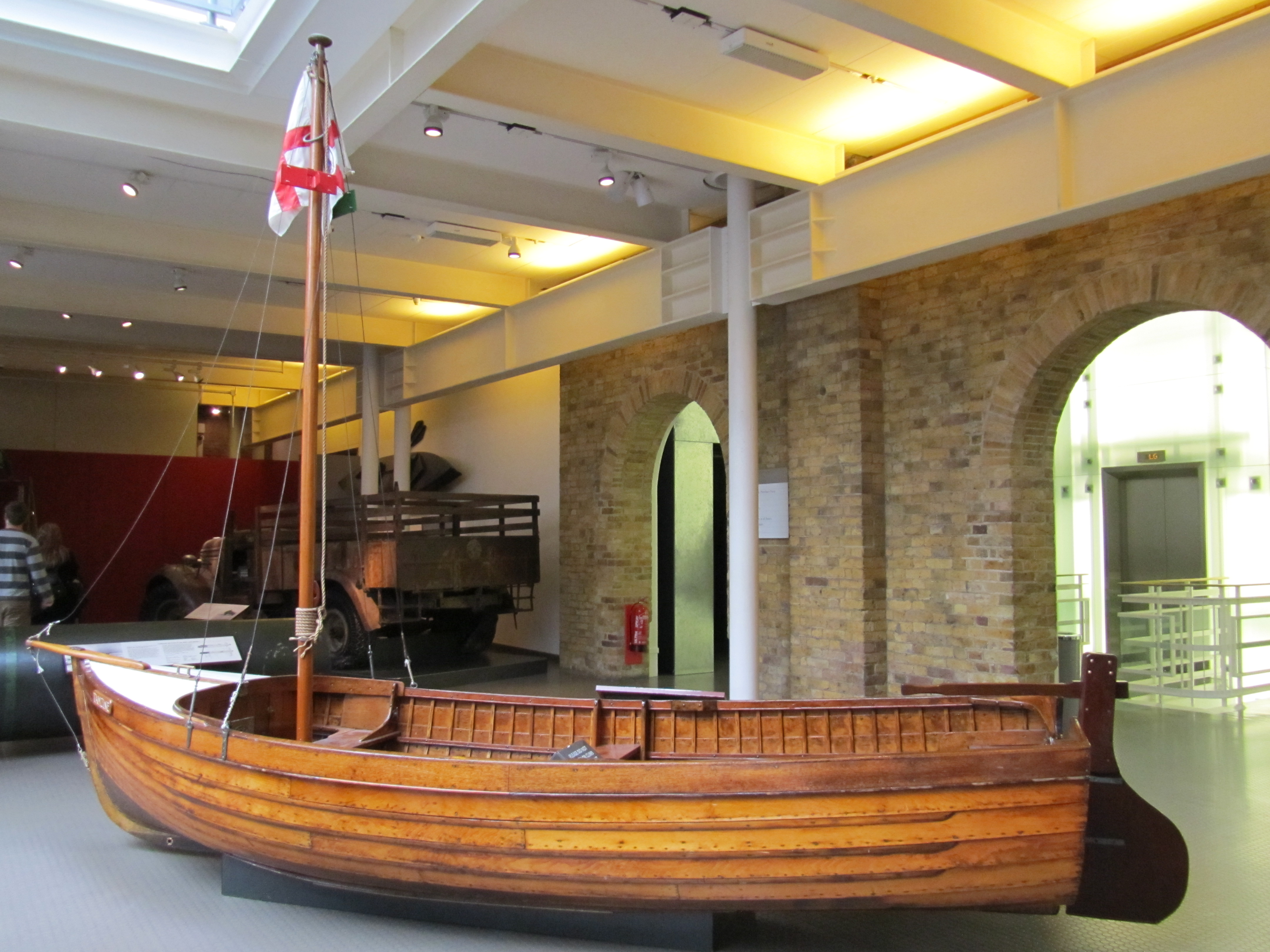
- Tamzine on display at IWM London, August 2012

History

United Kingdom
- Name: Tamzine
- Builder: Brockman & Titcombe, Margate
- Launched: 1937
- Homeport: Birchington-on-Sea
- Honours and awards: Dunkirk 1940
- Status: Preserved by Imperial War Museum
- Notes: Smallest known 'little ship' of Dunkirk

General characteristics
- Type: Open fishing boat
- Length: 14ft 7.5ins
- Beam: 5ft 1.5ins
- Draught: 1ft 6ins
- Propulsion: Outboard motor/sail

Tamzine is a historic fishing boat. Built by Brockman & Titcombe, of Margate in Kent, in south-east England, Tamzine is notable for having participated as a ''little ship' during the 1940 evacuation of the British Expeditionary Force from Dunkirk in northern France.

At 14.7 feet (4.5 m) in length Tamzine was the smallest vessel to take part in the evacuation. She is clinker-built of Canadian spruce and was constructed in 1937. In 1965 Tamzine participated in a twenty-fifth anniversary commemoration of the evacuation, repeating her Channel crossing. Her presence was recorded by the British newsreel Pathé News.

Tamzine was later acquired and preserved by the Imperial War Museum.

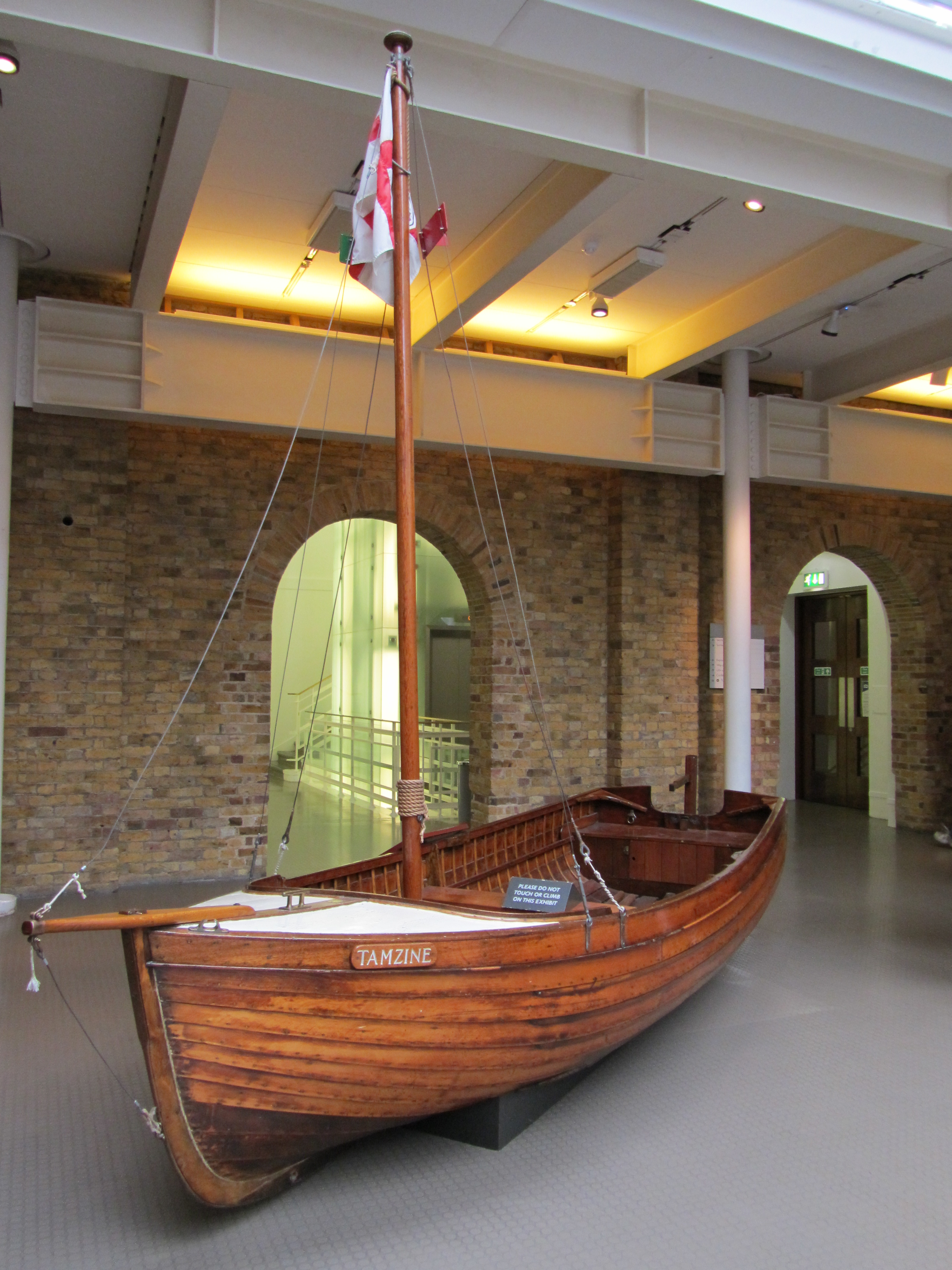
Bow view of Tamzine, showing nameplate
