= Little Ships of Dunkirk =

Boats in the 1940 Dunkirk evacuation

The Dunkirk Jack, flown only by civilian ships that participated in the Dunkirk evacuation

The Little Ships of Dunkirk consisted of over 800 naval and requisitioned vessels, and small, private boats, that sailed from Ramsgate in England to Dunkirk in northern France between 26 May and 4 June 1940 as part of Operation Dynamo, helping to rescue more than 336,000 British, French, and other Allied soldiers who were trapped on the beaches at Dunkirk during the Second World War.

== Overview ==
The situation of the troops, who had been cut off from their advance into France by a pincer movement from the German army, was regarded by the British prime minister Winston Churchill as the greatest military defeat for centuries; it appeared likely to cost Britain the war, as the majority of the British Expeditionary Force was trapped, leaving the country vulnerable to invasion by Germany. Because of the shallow waters, British destroyers were unable to approach the beaches, and soldiers had to wade out to the boats, many of them waiting hours in shoulder-deep water.

On 27 May 1940, the small-craft section of the British Ministry of Shipping telephoned boat builders around the coast, asking them to collect all boats with "shallow draught" that could navigate the shallow waters. Attention was directed to the pleasure boats, private yachts, and launches moored on the River Thames and along the south and east coasts. Some of them were taken with the owners' permission – and with the owners insisting they would sail them – while others were requisitioned by the government with no time for the owners to be contacted. The boats were checked to make sure they were seaworthy, fuelled, and taken to Ramsgate to set sail for Dunkirk. They were crewed by Royal Navy officers, ratings and experienced volunteers. Very few owners sailed their own vessels, apart from fishermen and one or two others.

When they reached France, some of the boats acted as shuttles between the beaches and the destroyers, ferrying soldiers to the warships. Others carried hundreds of soldiers each back to Ramsgate, England, protected by the Royal Air Force from the attacks of the Luftwaffe.

According to the Association of Dunkirk Little Ships, the term "Little Ship" applies to all craft that were originally privately owned and includes commercial vessels such as barges, fishing vessels, and pleasure steamers; the Association does include some ex-Service vessels, which are now privately owned, and ex-lifeboats.

== Notable vessels ==
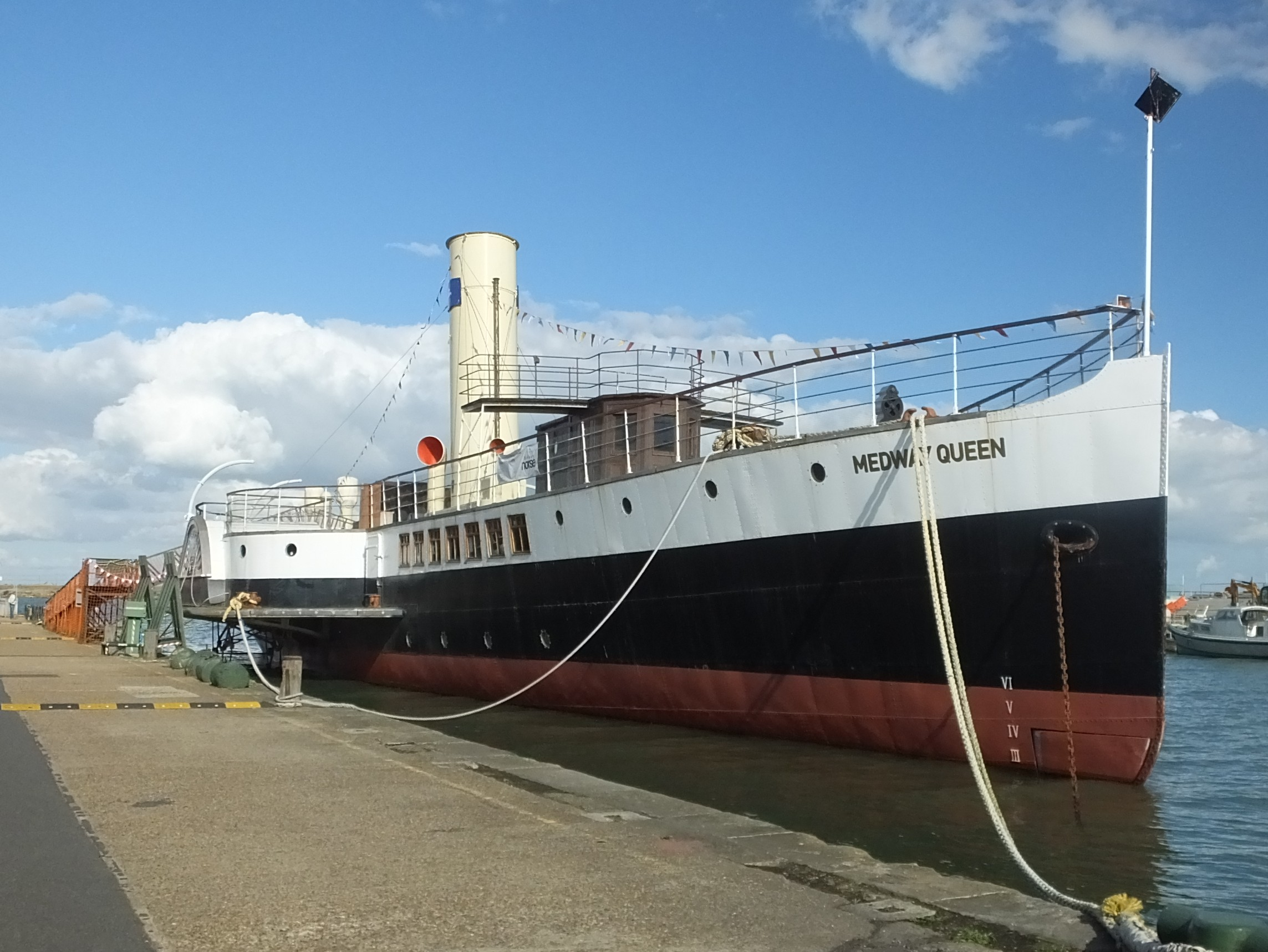
PS Medway Queen, 2016

- Royal Daffodil – Already in use for transporting troops on the 23 May. Requisitioned from the General Steam Navigation Company of London, evacuated 7,461 service personnel from Dunkirk in five trips between 28 May and 2 June, among them the French historian Marc Bloch, who served as a French army captain in the campaign. This was the largest number evacuated by a single passenger vessel in the operation. On 2 June, she was attacked by six German aircraft. A bomb dropped by one of them penetrated two of her decks and blew a hole below the water line, but she managed to limp back to port.
- Medway Queen – serving in the 10th Mine-sweeping Flotilla, the paddle steamer made the most (Note: some RN destroyers made as many or more trips) round trips – seven – rescuing 7,000 men and earning herself the nickname "Heroine of Dunkirk". Restored and rededicated in 2013, she can now be visited at Gillingham Pier in Kent.
- Massey Shaw – the London-based fireboat initially went to Dunkirk to help fight fires. It ended up making three trips across the channel rescuing over 500 troops, including 30 from the Emil de Champ, which had hit a mine.
- Sundowner – a motor yacht owned by Charles Lightoller, former second officer of the Titanic, was requisitioned by the Admiralty on 30 May. Lightoller insisted that, if anyone was going to take her to Dunkirk, it would be him and his eldest son, Roger, together with Sea Scout Gerald Ashcroft. The men transported 127 soldiers back to Ramsgate, reportedly packed together like sardines, almost capsizing when they reached the shore. As of 2024 she was under restoration with Michael Dennett Boat Builder.
- Bluebird of Chelsea – the yacht made two round trips to Kent, carrying hundreds of men.
- Tamzine – a fishing boat less than 15 feet (4.6 m) in length; the smallest boat to take part in the evacuation and now preserved by the Imperial War Museum.
- Marchioness – built in 1923, in 1989 she was involved in a collision with Bowbelle on the River Thames with the loss of 51 lives.
- Endeavour – one of six cockle boats in Leigh-on-Sea to go with their own crews to lift men from the beaches and the mole for transport to larger vessels. After restoration in 2001, she has been preserved by the Leigh-on-Sea Endeavour Trust and regularly returns to Dunkirk. She was one of the little ships to appear in Christopher Nolan's 2017 film Dunkirk.
- Firefly – a 26-ft wooden motor yacht, built in 1923 by Cole & Wiggins Ltd. of Leigh-on-Sea, Essex. In May 1940 Firefly was under the charge of Commander Bowen. Notable as one of the smaller vessels to have taken part in the evacuation and one of few to have an eyewitness account of her involvement, written by Corporal Denis Kinnell.
- Angele Aline, a French trawler

== RNLI lifeboats ==
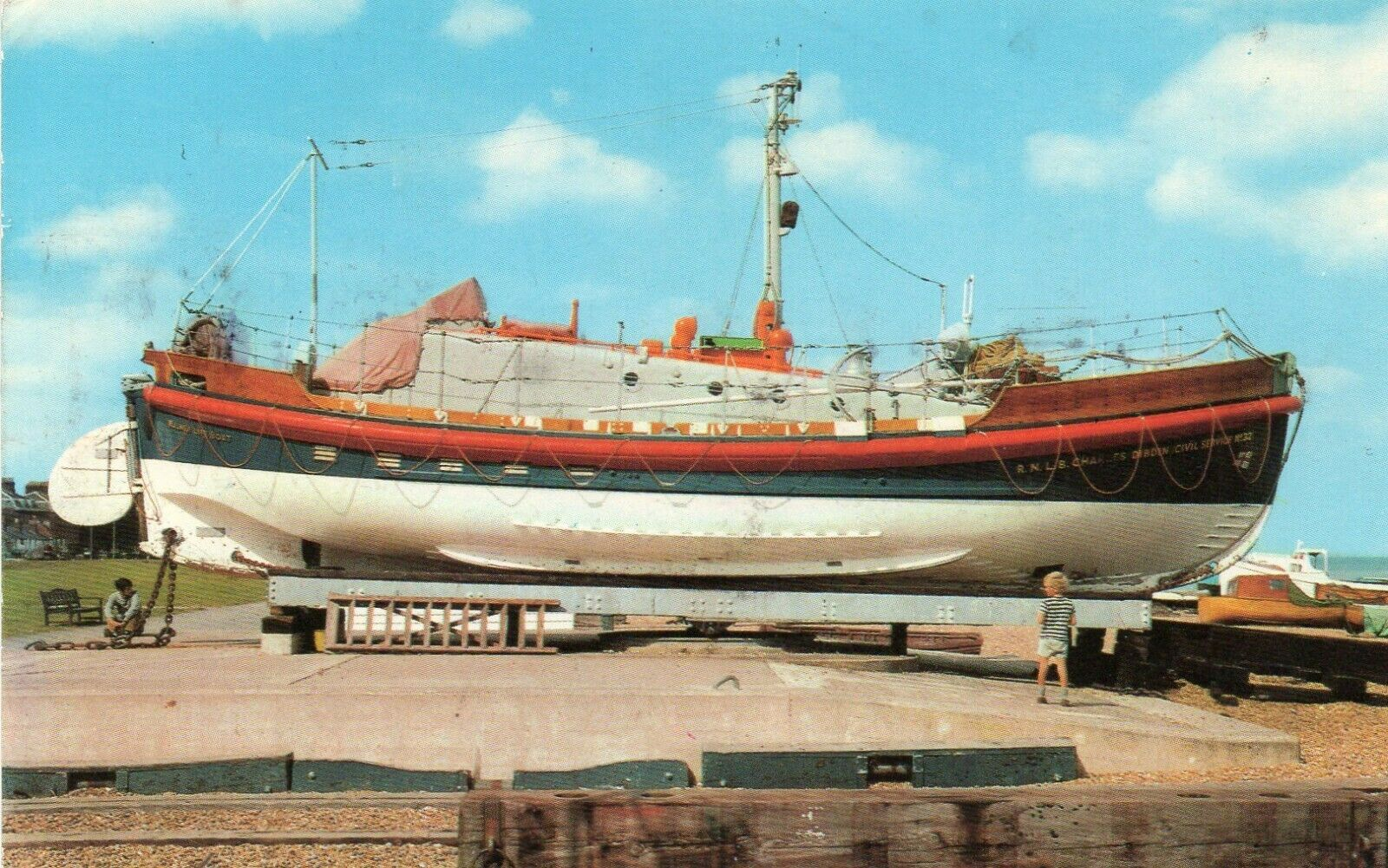
Walmer lifeboat Charles Dibdin

See also individual stations for more information in many cases.

- Abdy Beauclerk (ON 751), a Watson-class lifeboat from Aldeburgh Lifeboat Station No.1 Station.
- Cecil and Lilian Philpott (ON 730), a Watson-class lifeboat from Newhaven, Sussex. She evacuated 51 soldiers but was left high and dry on the beach for 4 hours until the next day when she resumed the evacuation.
- Charles Cooper Henderson (ON 761), a Beach-class lifeboat from Dungeness, Kent. The lifeboat was taken to Dunkirk with a crew of naval ratings. She got back to Dungeness but had sustained some damage.
- Charles Dibdin (Civil Service No. 2) (ON 762), a Beach-class lifeboat from Walmer, Kent.
- Cyril and Lilian Bishop (ON 740), a Self-righting-class lifeboat from Hastings, East Sussex.
- Edward Dresden (ON 707), a Watson-class lifeboat from Clacton-on-Sea. Worked along with E.M.E.D. (ON 705) in Dunkirk harbour. One of only a few boats taken to Dunkirk by her own crew.
- E.M.E.D. (ON 705), a Watson-class lifeboat from Walton and Frinton station. The lifeboat survived three enemy air attacks off Gravelines.
- Greater London (Civil Service No. 3) (ON 704), a Ramsgate-class lifeboat from Southend-on-Sea.
- Guide of Dunkirk (ON 826), a new and unnamed Watson-class lifeboat at the time of the evacuation.
- Herbert Sturmey (ON 664), a Self-righting-class lifeboat from Cadgwith.
- Jane Holland (ON 673), a Self-righting-class lifeboat from Eastbourne, East Sussex. She was holed when a Motor Torpedo Boat rammed her and her engine failed after being machine gunned by an aircraft. She was abandoned but later found adrift, towed back to Dover and repaired. She returned to service on 5 April 1941.
- Louise Stephens (ON 820), a Watson-class lifeboat from Gorleston and Great Yarmouth. She was taken to Dunkirk by a naval crew. She came back with a hole in her after endbox.
- Lucy Lavers (ON 832), a Liverpool-class lifeboat from Aldeburgh No: 2 station.
- Lord Southborough (Civil Service No. 1) (ON 688), a Watson-class lifeboat from Margate, Kent. After arriving on the beaches for a second time, she evacuated over 500 men to the destroyer HMS Icarus.
- Mary Scott (ON 691), a Norfolk and Suffolk-class lifeboat from Southwold. She was towed to Dunkirk by the paddle steamer Emperor of India together with two other small boats. Between them they took 160 men to their mother ship, then 50 to another transport vessel before her engine failed and could not be restarted. She was beached and abandoned at La Panne, east of Dunkirk. She eventually was refloated and returned to Southwold.
- Michael Stephens (ON 838), a 46' Watson-class lifeboat from Lowestoft. She worked inside the harbour in Dunkirk and was rammed twice by German MTBs (motor torpedo boats), but she returned to Dover under her own power.
- Prudential (ON 697), a Ramsgate-class lifeboat (a prototype) from Ramsgate. One of only a few boats taken to Dunkirk by her own crew, who collected 2,800 men from the beaches.
- Rosa Woodd and Phyliss Lunn (ON 758), a Watson-class lifeboat from Shoreham Harbour. She made three trips between Dover and Dunkirk.
- Thomas Kirk Wright (ON 811), a Surf-class lifeboat from Poole
- Viscountess Wakefield (ON 783), a Beach-class lifeboat from Hythe, Kent. She ran aground on the sands of La Panne, the only lifeboat to be sunk during the operation.

== Thames sailing barges ==
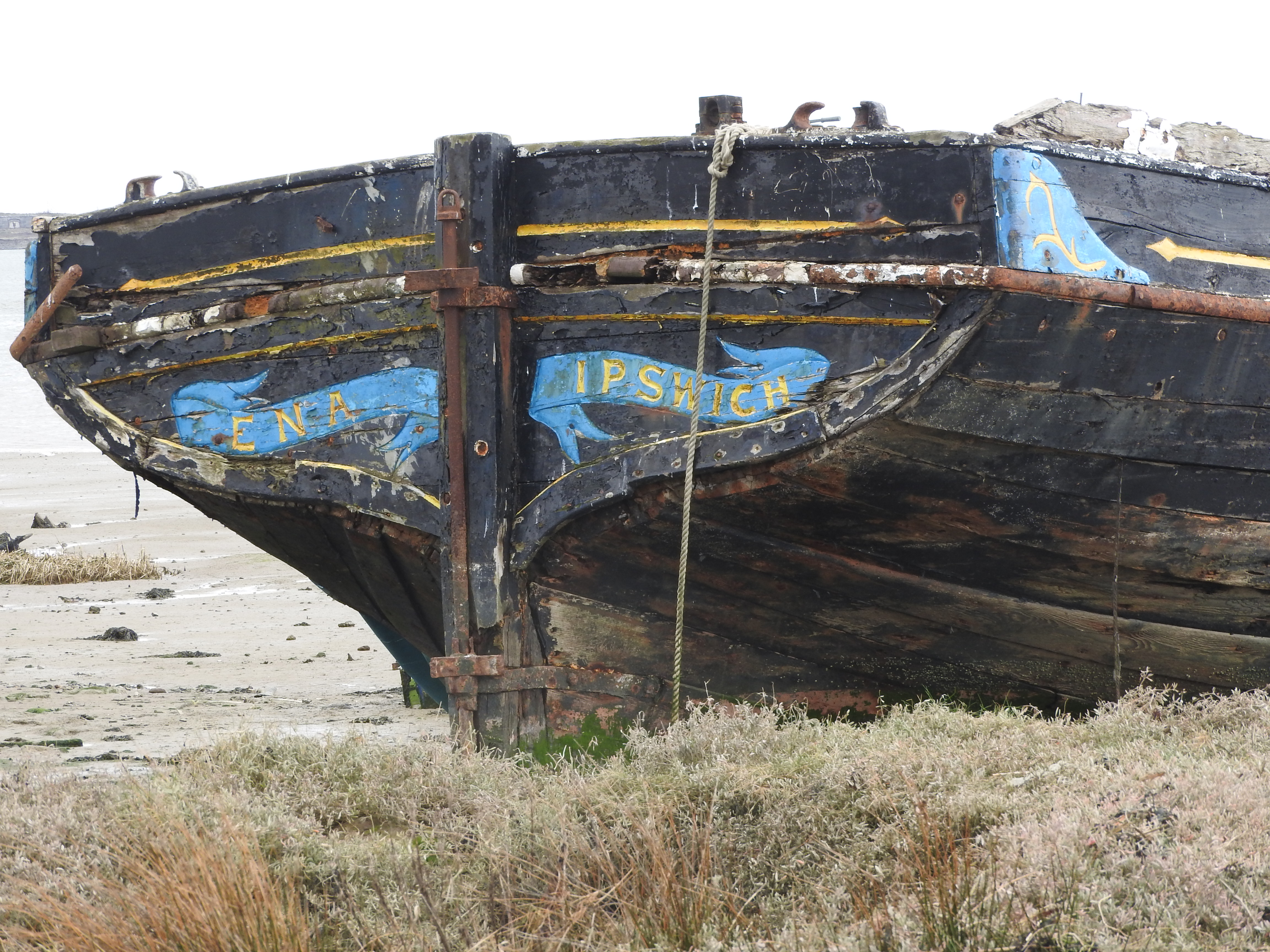
SB Ena lying in the mud at Hoo, 2018

Thirteen Thames sailing barges made the crossing, six from R & W Paul Ltd, grain and agricultural merchants of Harwich.

- Ena - On the Dunkirk beaches, her crew were ordered to abandon her. She was beached but then refloated by Lieutenant Colonel W. G. McKay and men of the 19th Field Regiment, Royal Artillery, and taken back to Ramsgate without assistance.
- Greta - Built in 1892, she is thought to be the oldest Little Ship still active.
- Pudge - Built in 1922 by London & Rochester Trading Co., she is one of only four of the Dunkirk Spritsail Barges which still survive.

== Dutch coasters ==
Thirty-nine Dutch coasters had escaped the occupation of the Netherlands by the Germans on 10 May 1940 and were asked by the Dutch shipping bureau in London or by the Royal Navy to assist. Approaching the beaches very closely due to their flat bottoms, they rescued 22,698 men.

The MV Rian, a 35-metre (115 ft) ship of 300 tons dwt built in 1934 in the province of Groningen, saved 2,542 men between 28 and 31 May 1940 under Captain D. Buining, the most men saved amongst the Dutch coasters. The vessel had already saved the crew of the British coaster SS Highwave on 30 January 1940. Other Dutch coasters that saved more than 1,000 men each were:

- MV Hondsrug: 1,455
- MV Patria: 1,400
- MV Hilda: 1,200
- MV Doggersbank: 1,200
- MV Horst: 1,150
- MV Twente: 1,139
- MV Friso: 1,002

Of these ships, seven were lost at Dunkirk or during the evacuation nearer the British coast.

== Belgian ships ==
The Belgian Army, commanded by King Leopold III, had surrendered to the Germans on 28 May. Numerous ships from the fishing fleet and small Corps de Marine were involved in Operation Dynamo. In total, 65 Belgian ships participated, including 54 fishing boats, four Corps de Marine units, four tugs, and two patrol vessels. The Belgian fishing fleet itself transported 4,300 British and French soldiers to the English coast.

Among the Belgian ships were Patrol vessel A5, Z25 De Ruyter and Belgian ship H75.

== Results ==
In nine days, 192,226 British and 139,000 French soldiers – more than 331,000 in total – were rescued by over 800 naval and requisitioned vessels, and small, private boats. The rescue operation turned a military disaster into a story of heroism which raised the morale of the British.

It was in describing the success of the operation to the House of Commons on 4 June 1940 that Churchill made his "we shall fight on the beaches" speech:

We shall go on to the end, we shall fight in France, we shall fight on the seas and oceans, we shall fight with growing confidence and growing strength in the air, we shall defend our Island, whatever the cost may be, we shall fight on the beaches, we shall fight on the landing grounds, we shall fight in the fields and in the streets, we shall fight in the hills; we shall never surrender ...

== Legacy ==
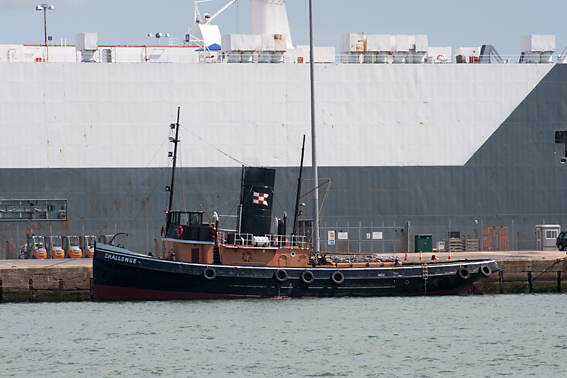
ST Challenge

The phrase "Dunkirk spirit" is still used to describe courage and solidarity in adversity.

The Association of Dunkirk Little Ships (ADLS) is an association for owners of Dunkirk Little Ships, founded in 1965. The Association organises a memorial crossing of Little Ships to Dunkirk every five years, escorted by the Royal Navy. Its flag is the St George's Cross defaced with the arms of Dunkirk. The 2020 Return was postponed with the hope that the fleet would cross instead in May 2021 but the ADLS had to cancel the visit due to the effect of the COVID-19 pandemic on the plans of the authorities in Dunkirk.

The Dunkirk Little Ships Restoration Trust is a registered charity established in 1993 to preserve and restore Dunkirk Little Ships. Its collection includes the steam tug ST Challenge, a vessel in the National Historic Fleet.

At least twelve actual Little Ships were used in the 2017 film Dunkirk.

One of the Little Ships, the Red Funnel paddle steamer Princess Elizabeth, is now owned by the City of Dunkirk and is permanently moored in the harbour as a floating conference centre.

== See also ==
- Battle of France
- Dunkirk evacuation
- National Historic Ships
- List of ships involved in the Dunkirk evacuation
- Little Ship Club
- The Snow Goose: A Story of Dunkirk novella by Paul Gallico
