= SB Pudge =

Wooden sailing barge, Dunkirk little ship

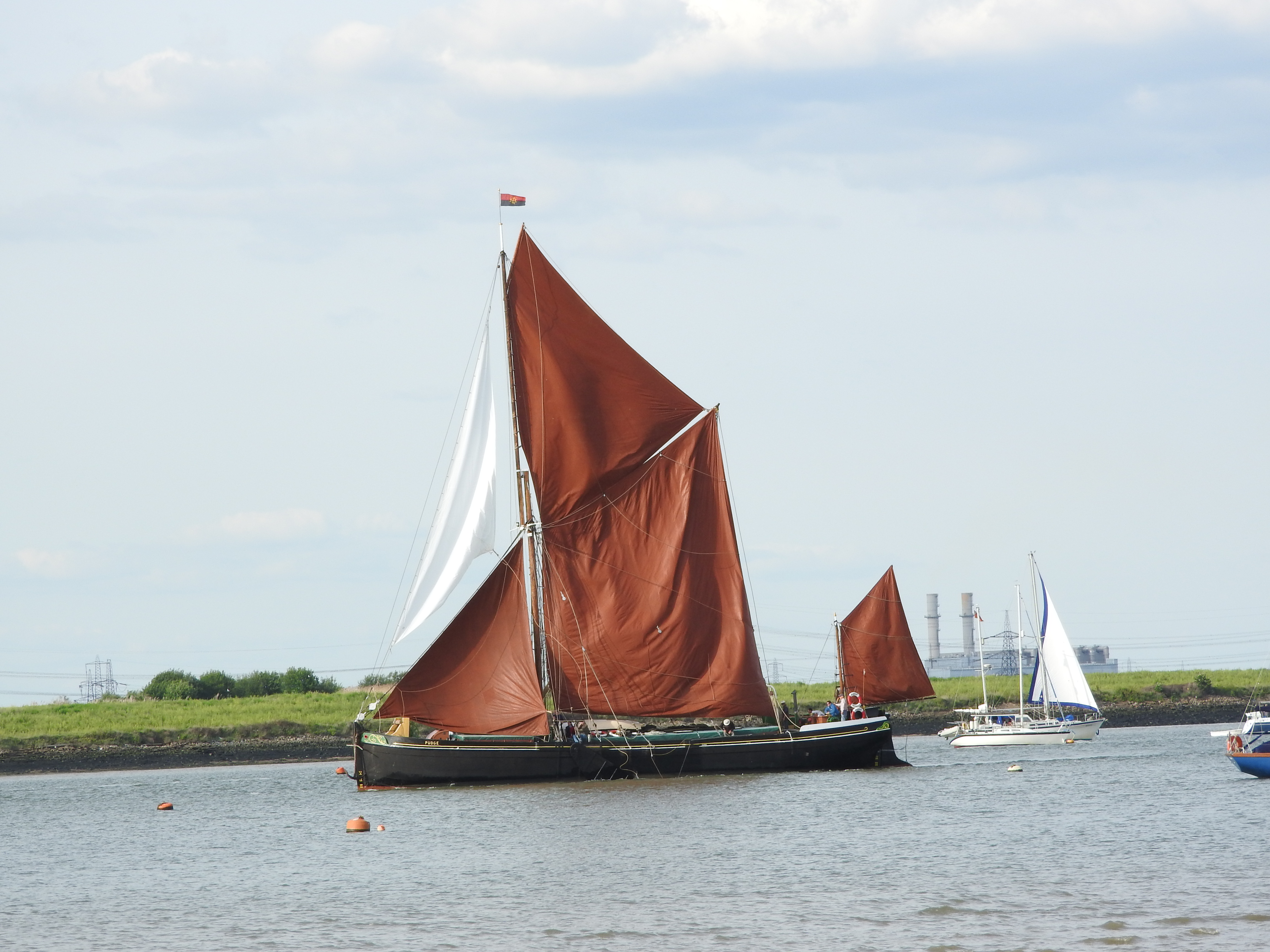
- Pudge on the Medway Estuary in 2017

History

United Kingdom
- Name: Pudge
- Owner: Thames Sailing Barge Trust
- Builder: London & Rochester Trading Co
- Commissioned: 1922
- Status: Private use and private charter ship

General characteristics
- Tonnage: 97
- Length: 92.5 ft (28.2 m)
- Beam: 22.5 ft (6.9 m)
- Height: 0 ft (0 m) to top of mainmast
- Draught: 3.5 ft (1.1 m) distance between the waterline and the bottom of the hull (keel)
- Propulsion: Spritsail and Kelvin 66hp diesel
- Notes: Pine on Oak

SB Pudge is a wooden Thames sailing barge, built in Rochester, Kent, England in 1922. Her hull was pitch pine on oak frame. She was originally spritsail rigged with bowsprit. An auxiliary oil engine made by The Bergius Co.Ltd of Glasgow was installed in 1932. She was used to carry various cargoes for the London & Rochester Trading Co until 1968, when she was bought out of trade by the Thames Sailing Barge Trust. Her last cargo was pineapple juice.

== History ==
Thames sailing barges were the heavy goods vehicles of their time, moving 150 tons of loose cargo at a time from outside the capital to the city. They brought in coal for the furnaces, bricks to construct mills and houses, and hay for the horses. Barges were used to transport rubbish from various cities out to the brickfields where it was used as fuel; it was only for the last mile of the trip to the brickfields that road transport had to be used. The spritsail rig has many advantages on rivers and in confined waters: maneuvering under topsail and mizzen catching the steadier wind clear of the wharf side buildings. Their flat-bottomed hulls allow them to ride over the shallow waters of the estuary and penetrate the creeks and higher reaches of the rivers of the south east. They could be berthed on a flat mud bank, against a camp-shed, on a barge bed or a held tide dock. Pudge carried general cargo:grain, cattle cake, fertilizer, etc..

=== Early life ===
By the 1880s, there were three types of sailing barges: stumpies, river barges and coasters. . She was launched on the 15 February 1895 by John and Herbert Cann at the Bathside yard, Gashouse Creek, Harwich. March relates that she was built specifically for the 1899 Medway Barge Race and that construction took six weeks. She won the race, passing over the finishing line at Upnor 2 1/2 minutes ahead of SB Giralda. The Mistley barges worked Dunkirk, Calais, Antwerp, Ostend, Alderney, Bruges and the Netherlands, from ports including Dover, Rochester, London, Lowestoft, Goole, Shoreham, Southampton and Newport.

=== Inter-war years ===
After the war, she resumed coastal trade. Ephraim Cripps was her skipper for twenty years and kept records of each voyage – Colchester was her main port from 1928 to 1930, and she worked the Essex and Suffolk coasts. In 1933 she joined the Colchester fleet of Francis and Gilders Ltd transporting grain between Norfolk, Suffolk and Essex, into London.

=== World War II ===
The first major civilian maritime event of the Second World War was the Dunkirk evacuation, in which hundreds of small ships rescued Allied soldiers from beaches in northern France. Like many of the sailing barge fleet, Pudge was requisitioned in May 1940 whilst in Tilbury, and sailed down to the assembly point at Dover. Under cover of darkness, the tug St. Fagan towed three barges, Pudge, Thyra and Lady Rosebery, to Dunkirk, and released them toward the beaches. St Fagan was hit by a mine, and she, Lady Rosebery and Doris were sunk. Pudge was lifted out of the water but "she came down the right way up". She took survivors on board and set off for England, picking up a tow from the tug Tanga on the way, to arrive safely back at Ramsgate.

=== 1988 Reconstruction ===
Hundred-year-old wooden boats need continuous maintenance. The planking and the flooring become soft, indicating a lack of strength, or even rot. Those components are easily replaced with other planks of pitch pine, though the wood in elements of the frame remains hidden, and requires stripping back to inspect and eventually replace. If the bow or the stern start to droop, the frame is suffering some problem, and the immediate thought is that it is rot. A loaded commercial barge would lie low in the water, and the water would support the structure and, in turn, the stresses caused by the standing rigging. A passenger-carrying barge would be subjected to greater stresses. The Pudge was displaying those symptoms. When the doubling was stripped back, many of the floors, and the port inner chine plank and the chine keelsons, were cracked or dislodged. These were 4-to-10-inch (100 to 250 mm) oak timbers, in some cases up to 35 feet (11 m) long. The damage was put down to two collisions, a sinking, a stranding, and the effect of the exploding mine at Dunkirk. Different woods were used in the reconstruction because timber of the original specification was no longer available.

== See also ==
- SB Centaur
- Coot Club
