= Szeged =

City in Hungary

- City with county rights
- Szeged Megyei Jogú Város
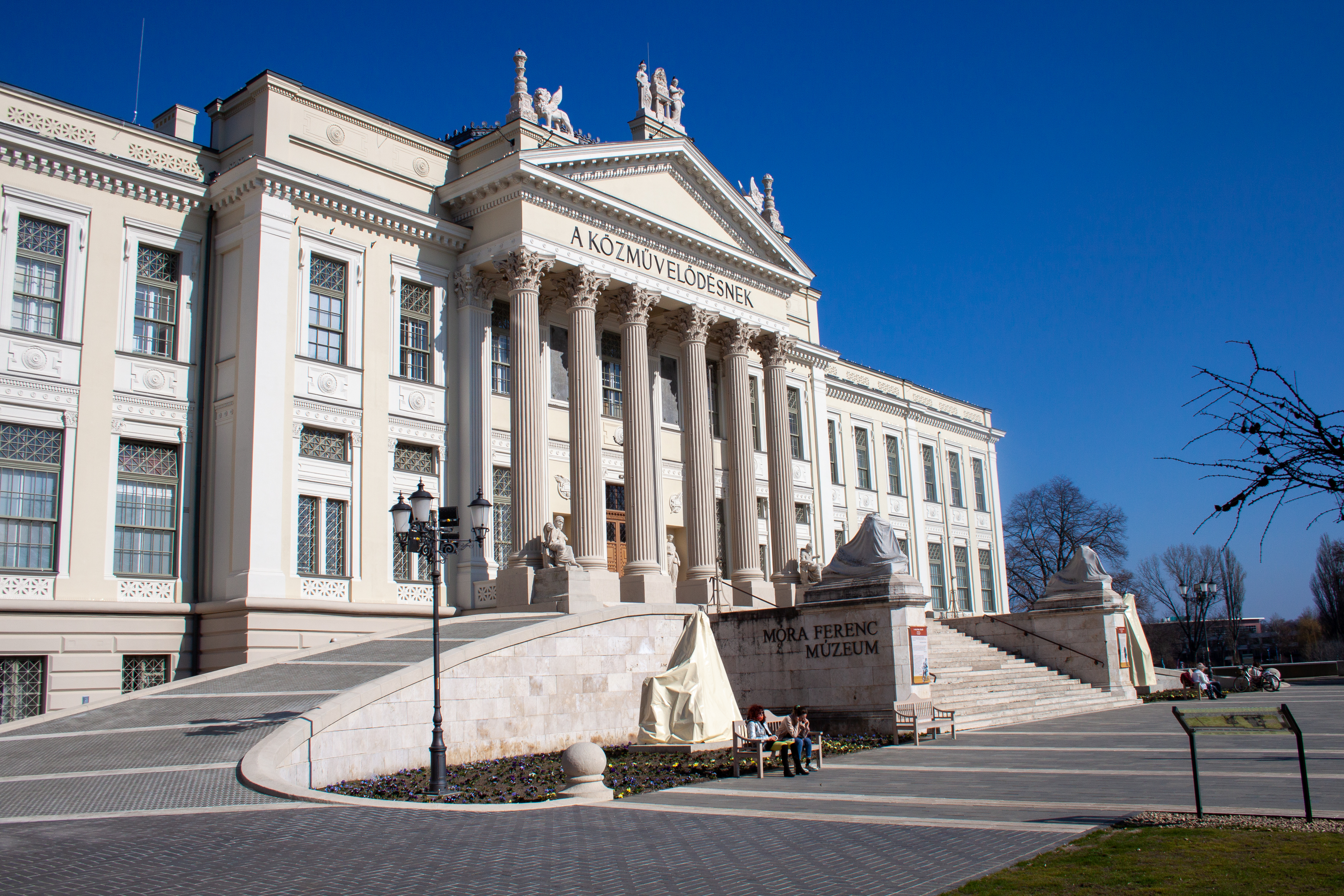
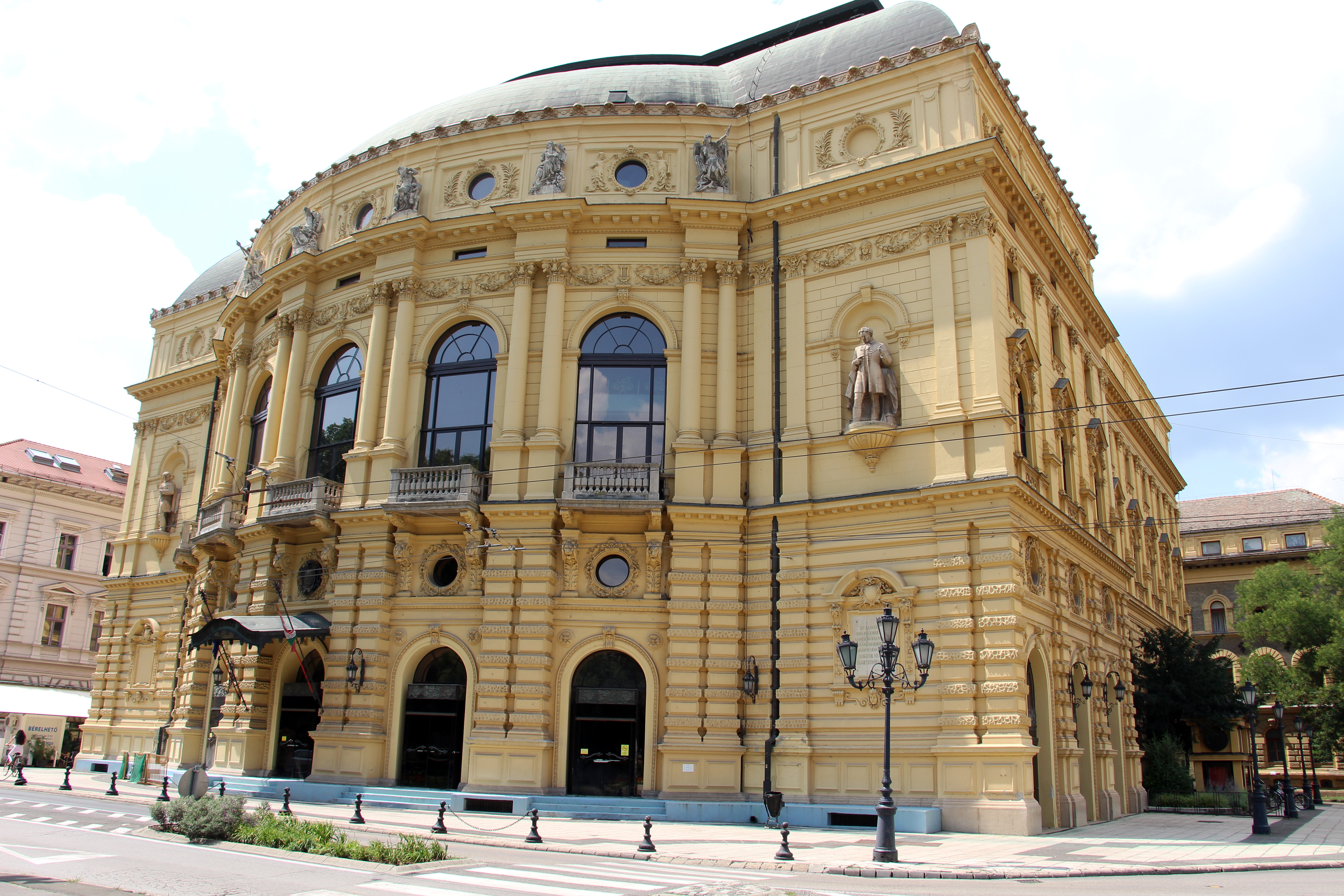
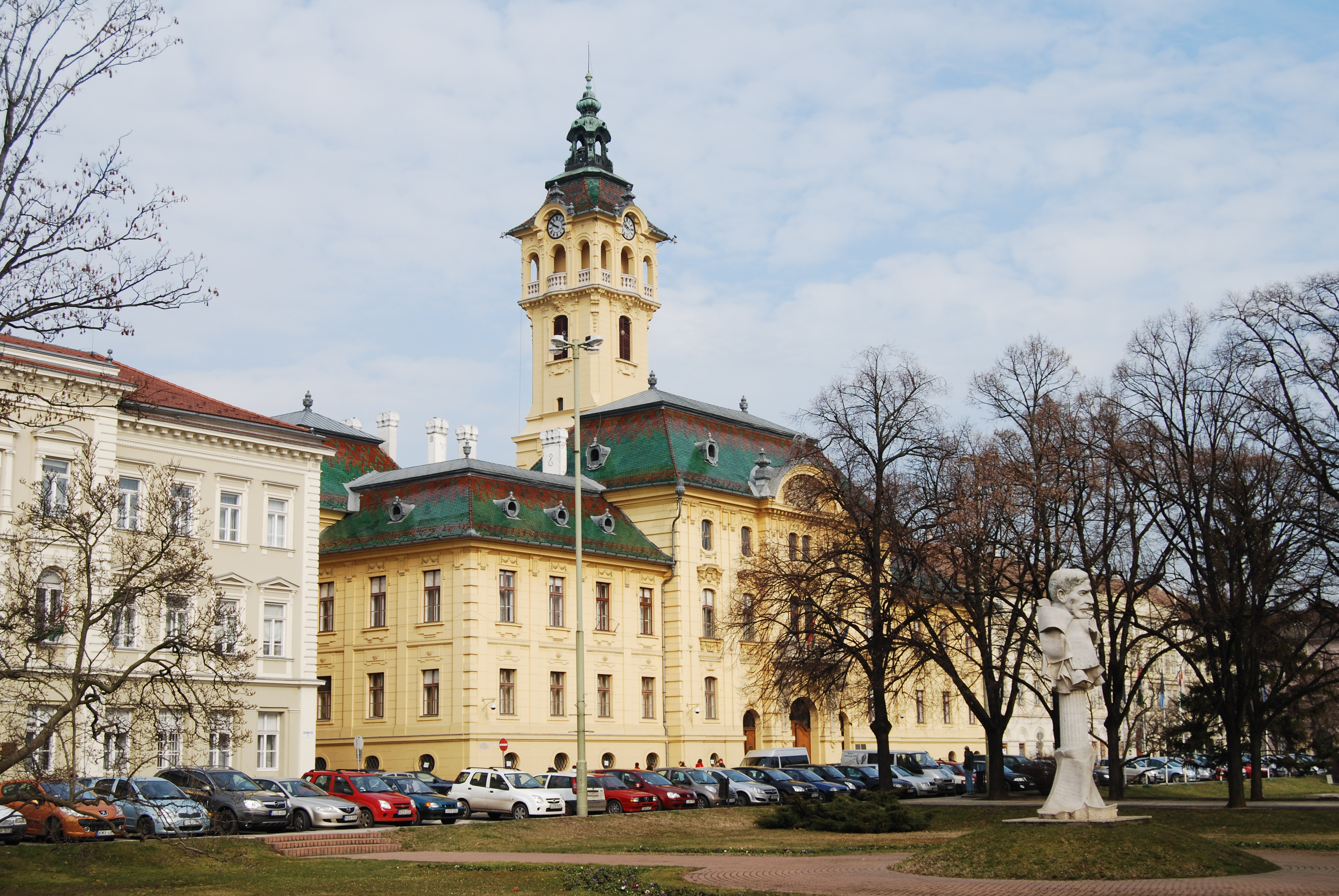
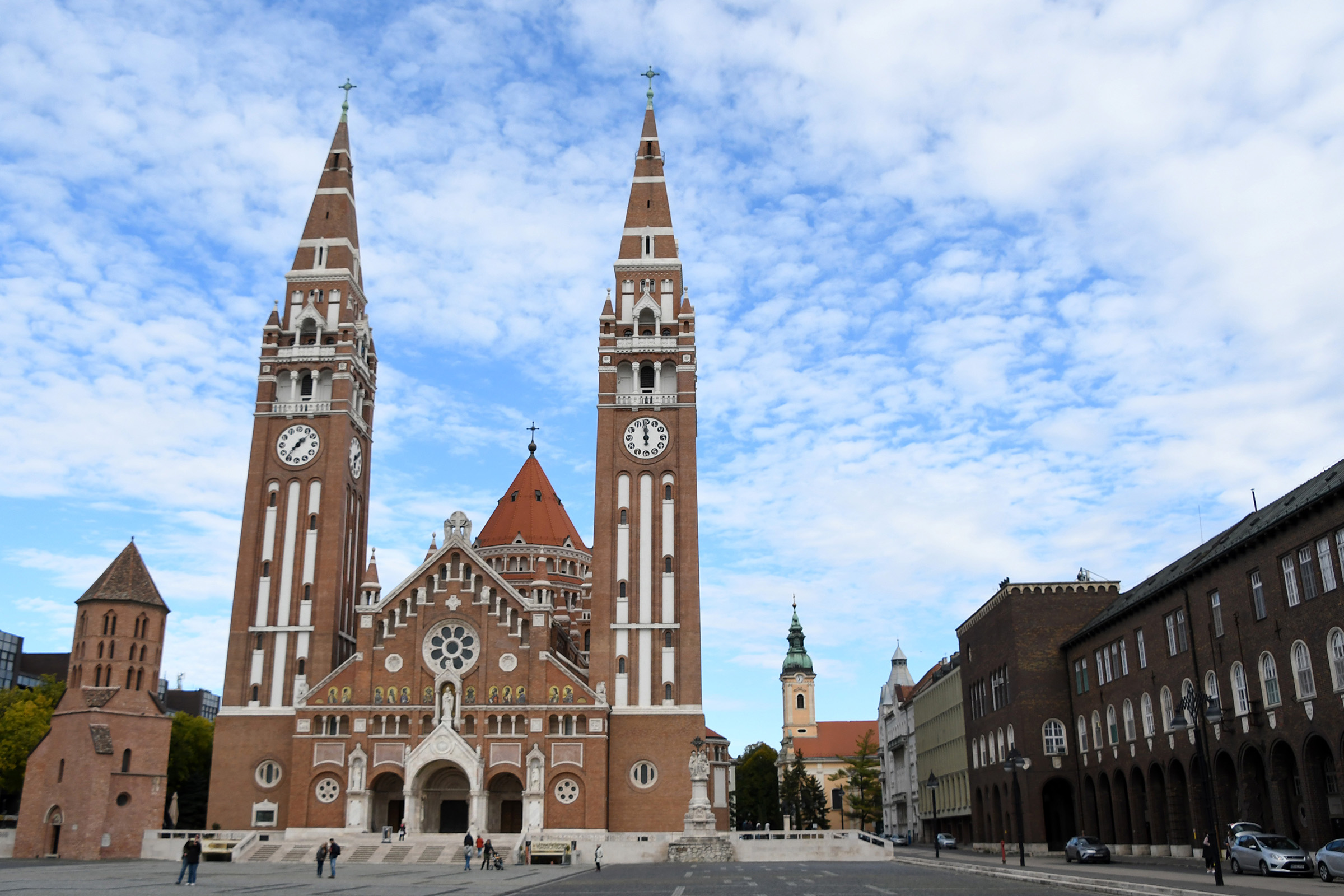
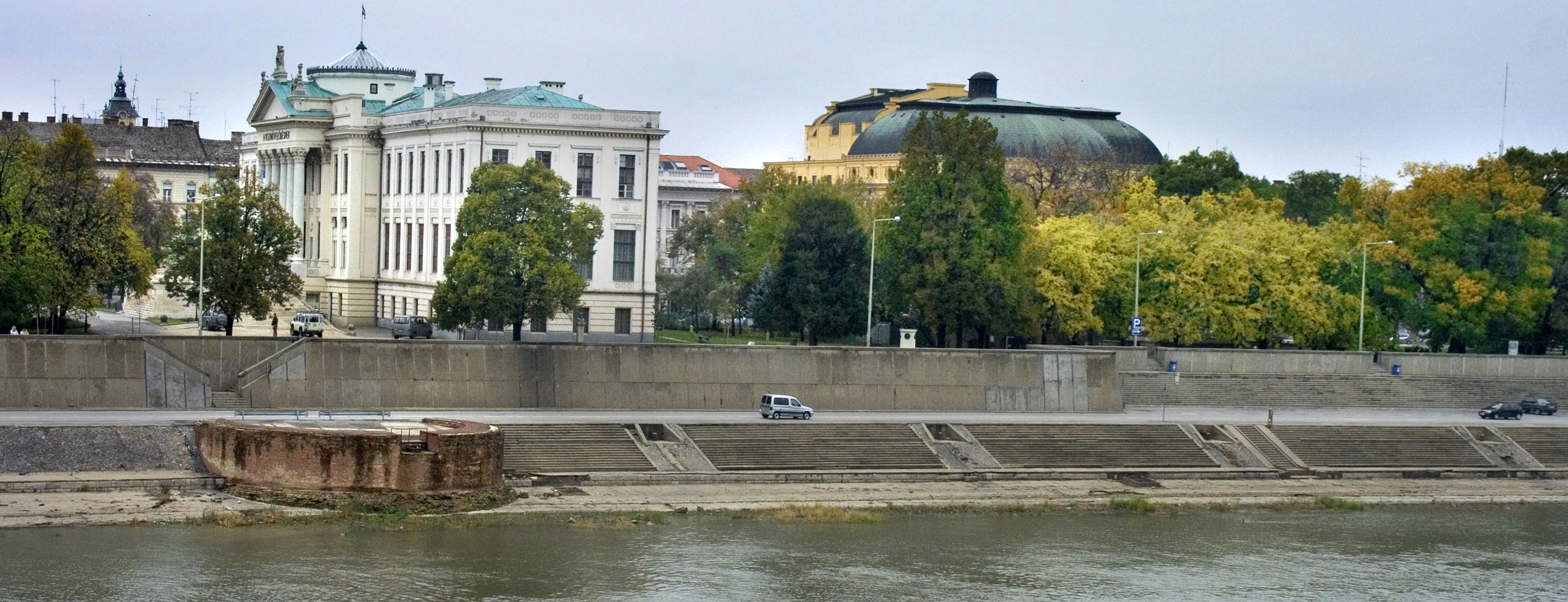
- Left to right: Ferenc Móra Museum; Szeged National Theater; City Hall; Szeged Csanad Cathedral; Tisza riverside view with the Ferenc Móra Museum and Szeged National Theater

- Flag Coat of arms Logo
- Nickname: City of Sunshine (Napfény városa)
- Location within Csongrád County Location within Hungary
- Coordinates: 46.255°N 20.145°E
- Country: Hungary
- Region: Southern Great Plain
- County: Csongrád-Csanád
- District: Szeged
- City status: 1498

Government
  - Mayor: László Botka (Összefogás Szegedért Egyesület)
  - Deputy mayor: List: Tamás Kovács (Independent); József Binszki (DK); Sándor Nagy (Momentum)
  - Town Notary: Éva Martonosi

Area
  - City with county rights: 280.84 km^{2} (108.43 sq mi)
  - Rank: 11th in Hungary
- Elevation: 76 m (249 ft)
- Highest elevation: 76.7 m (252 ft)
- Lowest elevation: 75.8 m (249 ft)

Population (2019)
  - City with county rights: 160,766
  - Rank: 3rd in Hungary
  - Density: 612.28/km^{2} (1,585.8/sq mi)
  - Urban: 239,025 (7th)
- Demonym: szegedi

Population by ethnicity
  - Hungarians: 83.9%
  - Romani: 0.9%
  - Germans: 0.9%
  - Serbs: 0.8%
  - Romanians: 0.3%
  - Slovaks: 0.2%
  - Other: 2.1%

Population by religion
  - Roman Catholic: 36.4%
  - Greek Catholic: 0.4%
  - Calvinists: 4.8%
  - Lutherans: 1.2%
  - Jews: 0.1%
  - Other: 2.4%
  - Non-religious: 23.4%
  - Unknown: 31.4%
- Time zone: UTC+01:00 (CET)
  - Summer (DST): UTC+02:00 (CEST)
- Postal code: 6700 to 6729, 6753, 6757, 6771, 6791
- Area code: (+36) 62
- Motorways: M5 Motorway; M43 Motorway
- NUTS 3 code: HU333
- Distance from Budapest: 162.8 km (101.2 mi) Northwest
- Airport: Szeged (LHUD)
- MPs: List: Sándor Szabó (Hungarian Socialist Party) Csongrád-Csanád County 1st constituency; Béla Mihálffy (Fidesz–KDNP) Csongrád-Csanád County 2nd constituency
- Website: szegedvaros.hu

Szeged (Note: /ˈsɛɡɛd/ SEG-ed, Hungarian: [ˈsɛɡɛd]; see also other alternative names) is the third largest city of Hungary, the largest city and regional centre of the Southern Great Plain and the county seat of Csongrád-Csanád county. The University of Szeged is one of the most distinguished universities in Hungary.

== Etymology ==
It is possible that the name Szeged is a mutated and truncated form of the final syllables of Partiscum, the name of a Roman colony founded in the 2nd century, on or near the site of modern Szeged. In Latin language contexts, Partiscum has long been assumed to be synonymous with Szeged. The Latin name is also the basis of the city's Greek name Παρτίσκον Partiskon.

However, Szeged might instead have originated (or been influenced by) an old Hungarian word for "corner" (szeg), pointing to the turn of the river Tisza that flows through the city. Others say it derives from the Hungarian word sziget which means "island". Others still contend that szeg means "dark blond" (sötétszőkés) – a reference to the color of the water where the rivers Tisza and Maros merge.

Szeged has a variety of names in languages other than Hungarian. These are usually formed by the addition of a suffix -in to the Hungarian name: Romanian: Seghedin; German: Szegedin or Segedin; Serbo-Croatian: Segedin/Сегедин; Italian: Seghedino; Latvian: Segeda; Lithuanian: Segedas; Polish: Segedyn; Slovak and Czech: Segedín; Turkish: Segedin.

== History ==
Szeged and its area have been inhabited since ancient times. Ptolemy mentions the oldest known name of the city: Partiscum (Ancient Greek: Πάρτισκον). It is possible that Attila, king of the Huns had his seat somewhere in this area. The name Szeged was first mentioned in 1183, in a document of King Béla III.

In the second century AD, there was a Roman trading post established on an island in the Tisza, and the foundations of the Szeged castle suggest that the structure may have been built over an even earlier fort. Today only one corner of the castle still remains standing.

During the Mongol invasion, the town was destroyed and its inhabitants fled to the nearby swamps, but they soon returned and rebuilt their town. In the 14th century, during the reign of Louis the Great, Szeged became the most important town of Southern Hungary, and – as the Ottoman military frontier got closer to Hungary – the strategic importance of Szeged grew. King Sigismund of Luxembourg had a city wall built. Szeged was raised to free royal town status in 1498.

Szeged was first pillaged by the Ottoman Army on 28 September 1526, but was occupied only in 1543, and became an administrative centre of the Ottoman Empire (see Ottoman Hungary) during the reign of Suleiman the Magnificent. The town was a sanjak centre first in Budin Eyaleti (1543–1596), after in Eğri Eyaleti. The town was taken from Ottoman rule on 23 October 1686, and regained the free royal town status in 1715. In 1719, Szeged received its coat of arms (still used today) from Charles III. During the next several years, Szeged grew and prospered. Piarist monks arrived in Szeged in 1719 and opened a new grammar school in 1721. Szeged also held scientific lectures and theatrical plays. These years brought not only prosperity but also enlightenment. Between 1728 and 1744, witch trials were frequent in the town, with the Szeged witch trials of 1728–29 perhaps being the largest. The witch trials were instigated by the authorities, who decided on this measure to remove the problem of the public complaints about the drought and its consequences of famine and epidemics by laying the responsibility on people among them, which had fraternized with the Devil. In 1720, the ethnic Hungarian population of the town numbered about 13000 to 16000, while the number of the Serb inhabitants was 1300.

The first printing press was established in 1801, and the old town hall and the civil hospital were built at the same time.

Szeged is known as the home of paprika, a spice made from dried, powdered capsicum fruits. Paprika arrived in Hungary in the second half of the 16th century as an ornamental plant. About 100 years later, the plant was cultivated as an herb, and paprika as we know it. Szeged is also famous for their szekelygulyas, a goulash made with pork, sauerkraut and sour cream. And also famous for their halászlé, fish soup made of carp and catfish.

The citizens of Szeged played an important part in the Hungarian Revolution of 1848. Lajos Kossuth delivered his famous speech here. Szeged was the last seat of the revolutionary government in July 1849. The Habsburg rulers punished the leaders of the town, but later Szeged began to prosper again; the railway reached it in 1854, and the town got its free royal town status back in 1860. Mark Pick's shop – the predecessor of today's Pick Szeged salami factory – was opened in 1869.

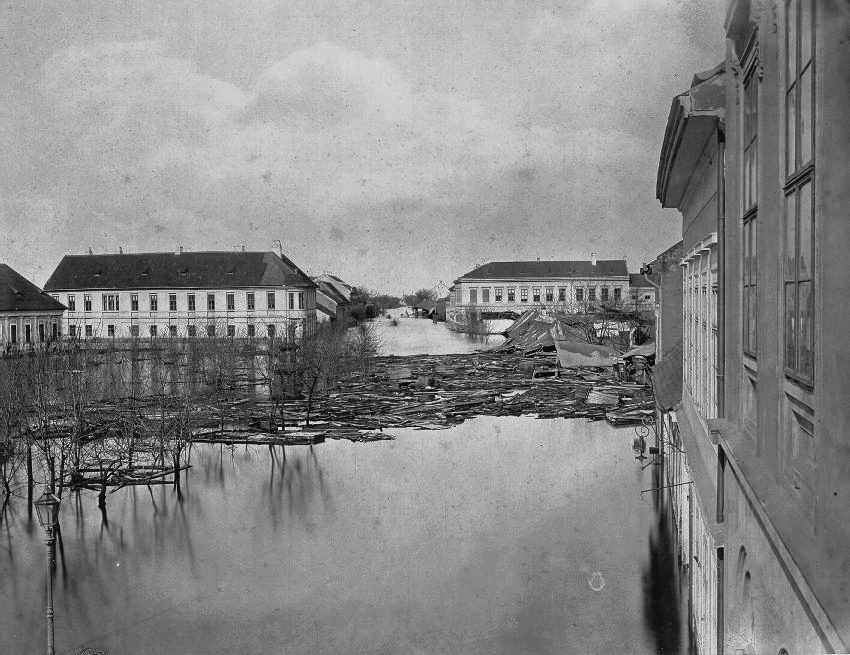
Szeged during the flood of 1879

Today the inner city of Szeged has wide avenues. This is mainly due to the great flood of 1879, which wiped away the whole town (only 265 of the 5723 houses remained and 165 people died). Emperor Franz Joseph visited the town and promised that "Szeged will be more beautiful than it used to be". He kept his promise, and during the next years a new, modern city emerged from the ruins, with palaces and wide streets.

=== 20th century ===
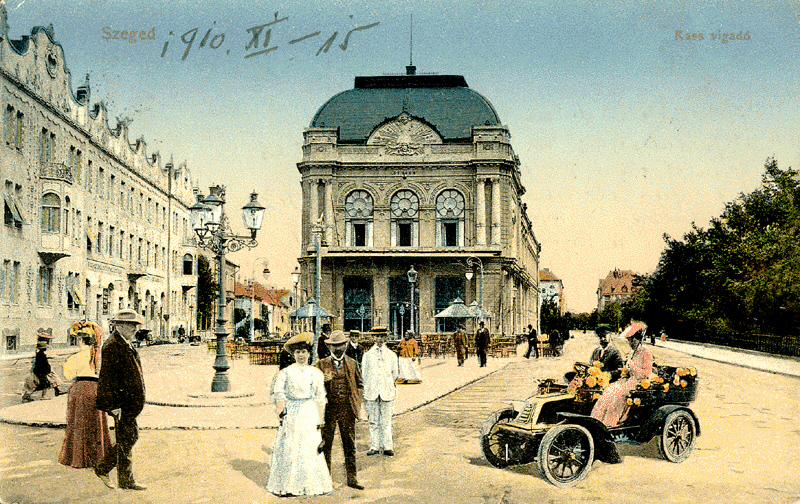
Early 20th-century postcard

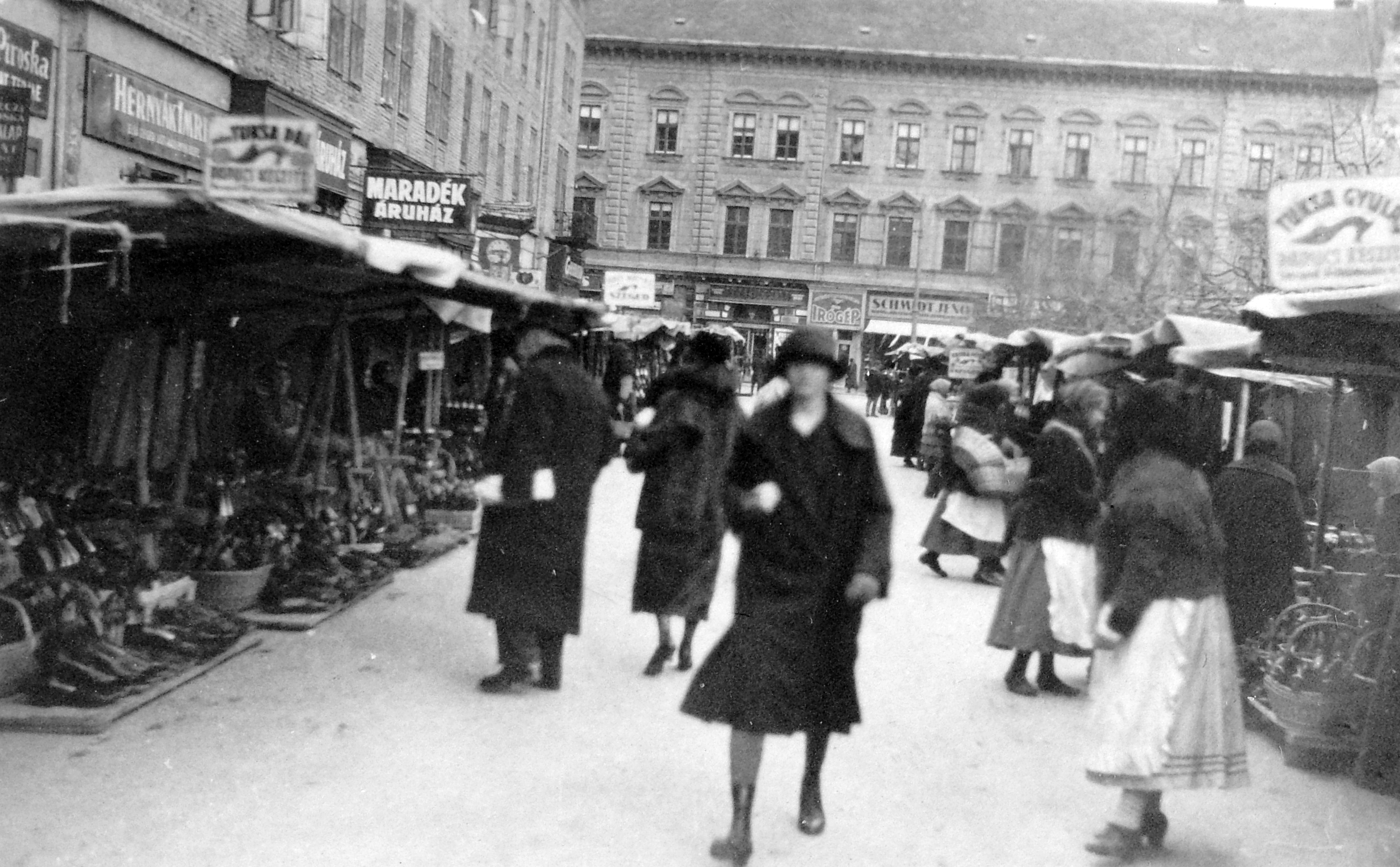
Shoppers in Szeged, 1929

After the First World War, Hungary lost its southern territories to Serbia, as a result Szeged became a city close to the border, and its importance lessened, but as it took over roles that formerly belonged to the now lost cities, it slowly recovered. Following the loss of Transylvania to Romania, the University of Kolozsvár (now Cluj-Napoca) moved to Szeged in 1921 (see University of Szeged). In 1923, Szeged took over the role of episcopal seat from Temesvár (now Timișoara, Romania). It was briefly occupied by the Romanian army during the Hungarian-Romanian War in 1919. It also became a center for right-wing forces which would install Miklós Horthy as the country's new leader after the overthrow of the Hungarian Soviet Republic. During the 1920s, the Jewish population of Szeged grew and reached its zenith.

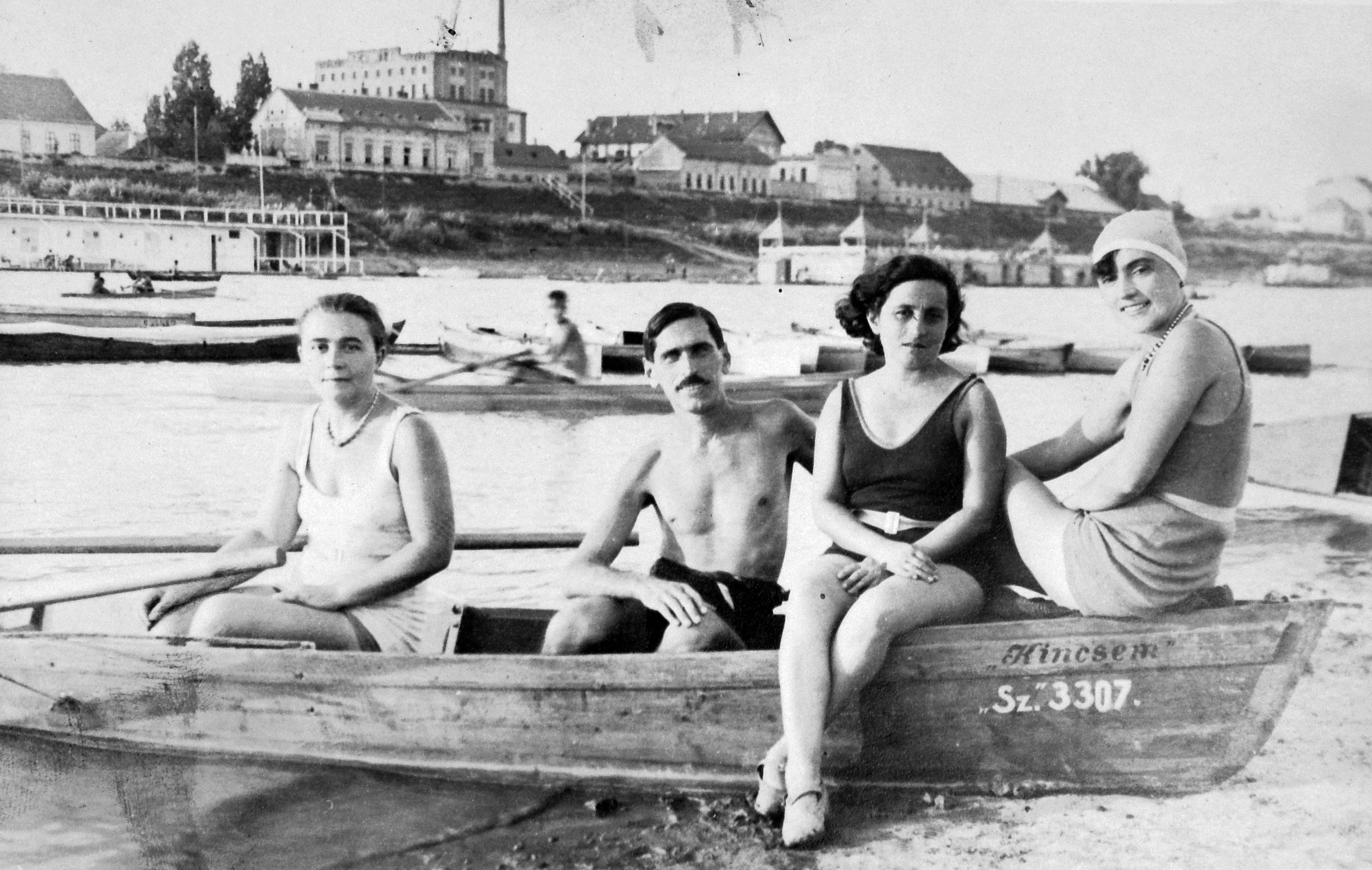
Swimmers at Szeged, 1939

Szeged suffered heavily during World War II. 6,000 inhabitants of the city were killed. In 1941, there were 4,161 Jews living in Szeged. After the March 19, 1944 German invasion, they were confined to a ghetto together with the Jews from surrounding villages. In June 1944, the ghetto was liquidated. The Nazis murdered the larger part of the 8,500 and some were forced into forced labor at the Strasshof concentration camp in Austria. Szeged was captured by Soviet troops of the 2nd Ukrainian Front on 11 October 1944 in the course of the Battle of Debrecen. During the communist era, Szeged became a centre of light industry and food industry. In 1965, oil was found near the city.

In 1962, Szeged became the county seat of Csongrád. Whole new districts were built, and many nearby villages (e.g. Tápé, Szőreg, Kiskundorozsma, Szentmihálytelek, Gyálarét) were annexed to the city in 1973 (as was a tendency during the Communist era).

Today's Szeged is an important university town and a tourist attraction.

The Szeged Symphony Orchestra (Szegedi Szimfonikus Zenekar) gives regular concerts at the Szegedi Nemzeti Színház.

== Geography ==
Szeged is situated near the southern border of Hungary, just to the south of the mouth of the Maros River, on both banks of the Tisza River, nearly in the centre of the Carpathian Basin. The Hungarian frontier with Serbia is just outside the town.

=== Climate ===
Szeged's climate is transitional between humid subtropical (Köppen Cfa) and humid continental (Köppen Dfa), with cold winters, hot summers, and fairly low precipitation. Due to the high hours of sunlight reported annually, Szeged is often called City of Sunshine (Napfény városa). On 23 July 2022, a maximum temperature of 40.1 °C (104.2 °F) was registered in Szeged.

Climate data for Szeged, 1991–2020
Month	Jan	Feb	Mar	Apr	May	Jun	Jul	Aug	Sep	Oct	Nov	Dec	Year
Record high °C (°F)	17.5 (63.5)	20.5 (68.9)	24.9 (76.8)	31.6 (88.9)	34.0 (93.2)	38.0 (100.4)	39.6 (103.3)	39.4 (102.9)	37.6 (99.7)	29.1 (84.4)	23.5 (74.3)	16.5 (61.7)	39.6 (103.3)
Mean daily maximum °C (°F)	3.4 (38.1)	6.3 (43.3)	12.1 (53.8)	18.5 (65.3)	23.2 (73.8)	26.9 (80.4)	28.9 (84.0)	29.4 (84.9)	23.8 (74.8)	17.7 (63.9)	10.6 (51.1)	4.1 (39.4)	17.1 (62.8)
Daily mean °C (°F)	−0.1 (31.8)	1.6 (34.9)	6.4 (43.5)	12.0 (53.6)	16.9 (62.4)	20.6 (69.1)	22.3 (72.1)	22.4 (72.3)	17.2 (63.0)	11.7 (53.1)	6.1 (43.0)	1.0 (33.8)	11.5 (52.7)
Mean daily minimum °C (°F)	−3.0 (26.6)	−2.3 (27.9)	1.3 (34.3)	6.1 (43.0)	10.9 (51.6)	14.3 (57.7)	15.7 (60.3)	15.8 (60.4)	11.4 (52.5)	6.7 (44.1)	2.5 (36.5)	−1.7 (28.9)	6.5 (43.7)
Record low °C (°F)	−25.1 (−13.2)	−23.1 (−9.6)	−19.6 (−3.3)	−6.8 (19.8)	0.9 (33.6)	3.9 (39.0)	6.2 (43.2)	7.5 (45.5)	1.0 (33.8)	−7.9 (17.8)	−11.9 (10.6)	−25.0 (−13.0)	−25.1 (−13.2)
Average precipitation mm (inches)	27.3 (1.07)	30.1 (1.19)	29.7 (1.17)	36.6 (1.44)	60.8 (2.39)	75.3 (2.96)	61.6 (2.43)	43.5 (1.71)	49.1 (1.93)	44.6 (1.76)	37.0 (1.46)	39.3 (1.55)	534.9 (21.06)
Average precipitation days (≥ 1.0 mm)	6.0	5.8	5.7	5.8	7.8	8.1	6.6	5.5	6.8	6.1	6.3	7.0	77.5
Average relative humidity (%)	86.9	80.2	69.9	64.9	67.0	68.4	65.9	64.6	70.0	76.5	83.3	87.9	73.8
Mean monthly sunshine hours	59	94	143	173	234	252	278	263	199	153	77	53	1,978
Source 1: NOAA
Source 2: WMO (sunshine 1981–2010)

== Education ==
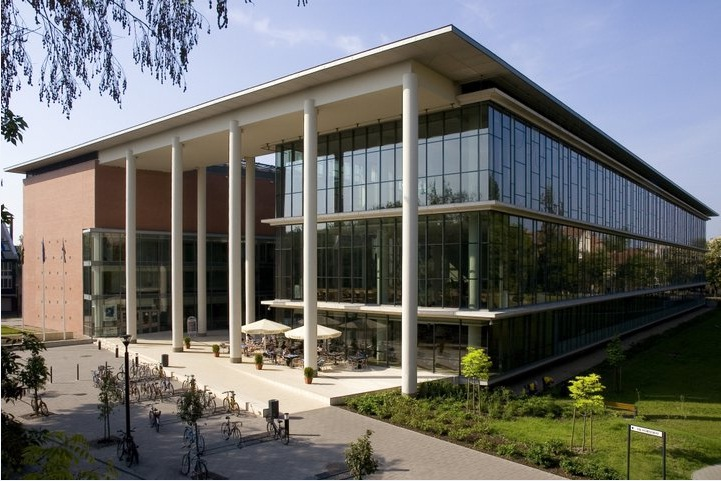
Attila József Study and Information Centre, the most recent building at University of Szeged

The city of Szeged has 62 kindergartens, 32 elementary schools and 18 high schools. The two most prominent high schools (Ságvári Endre Gyakorló Gimnázium and Radnóti Miklós Kísérleti Gimnázium) are in the top fifteen in the country.

Szeged is the higher education centre of the Southern Great Plain and has built quite a reputation for itself. Thousands of students study here, many of whom are foreigners. The University of Szeged is according to the number of students the second largest and the 4th oldest university of Hungary being established in 1581. Ranked as the top university of the country on Academic Ranking of World Universities – 2005, and in the top 100 in Europe, it offers several programs on different fields of study.

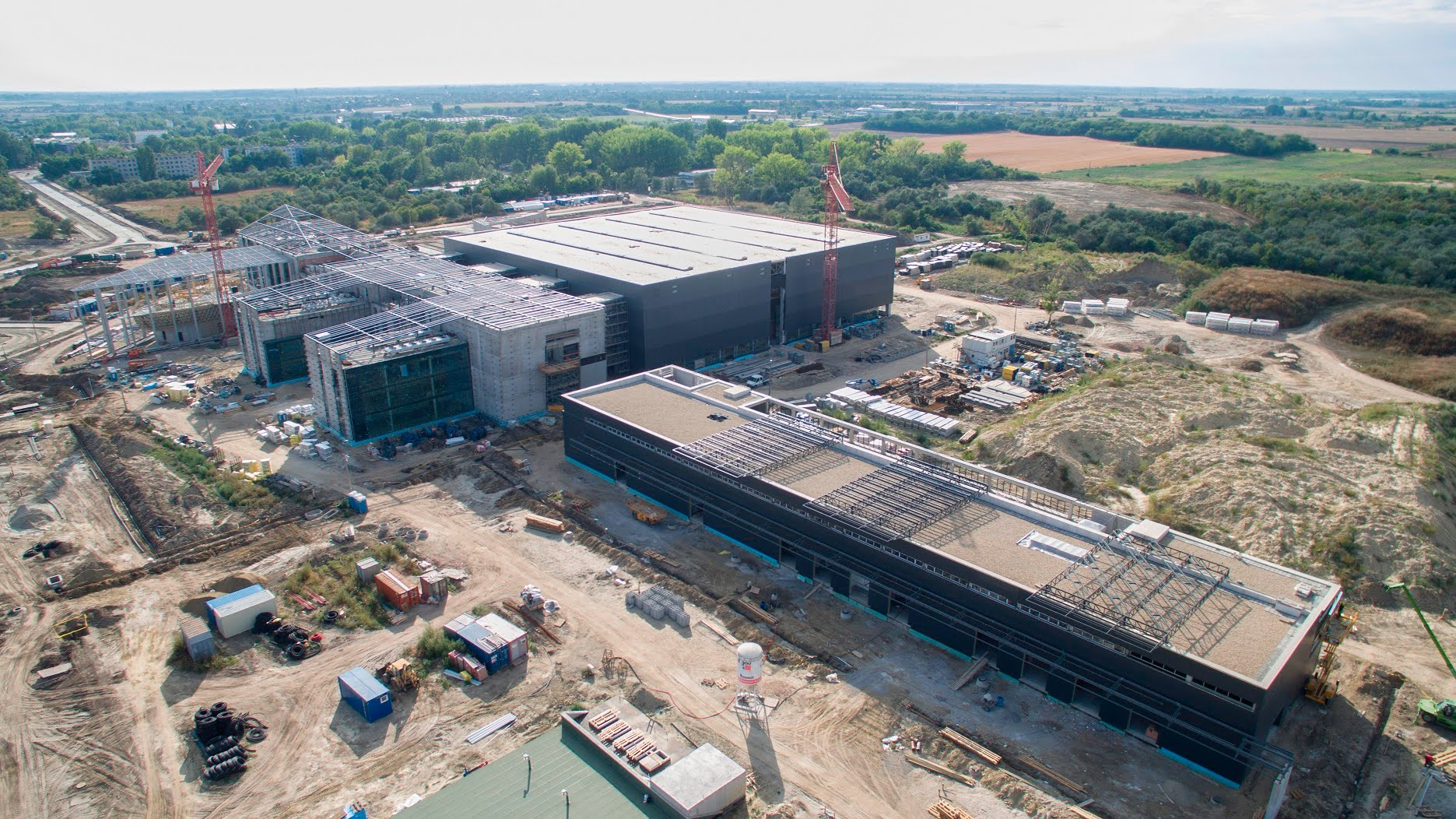
The ELI-ALPS research institute under construction in 2017

The Biological Research Centre of the Hungarian Academy of Sciences, which was built with the help of UNESCO funds, has been a source of research. Scientists at this laboratory were first in the world to produce artificial heredity material in the year 2000. The building has served as a home to many conferences.

The Szent-Györgyi Albert Agóra is a cultural scientific centre of Szeged which gives home to laboratories of the Biological Research Centre and to exhibitions of the John von Neumann Computer Society especially their IT historical exposition.

In 2018, the new scientific institution, the ELI Attosecond Light Pulse Source (ELI-ALPS) opened in Szeged establishing a unique facility which provides light sources within an extremely broad frequency range in the form of ultrashort pulses with high repetition rate which is needed for different kinds of physical experiments especially in the field of attosecond physics.

It is also one of the main options for medical students who come from all around Europe to study Medicine in their recognized international campus.

== Demographics ==
Historical population
Year	Pop.	±%
1870	56,901	—
1880	59,143	+3.9%
1890	68,924	+16.5%
1900	82,803	+20.1%
1910	96,063	+16.0%
1920	100,175	+4.3%
1930	108,448	+8.3%
1941	110,740	+2.1%
1949	104,867	−5.3%
1960	117,515	+12.1%
1970	145,312	+23.7%
1980	164,437	+13.2%
1990	169,930	+3.3%
2001	168,273	−1.0%
2011	168,048	−0.1%
2022	158,797	−5.5%

Ethnic groups (2001 census):

- Hungarians – 93.5%
- Romani – 0.7%
- Germans – 0.5%
- Serbs – 0.2%
- Romanians – 0.2%
- Croats – 0.1%
- Slovaks – 0.1%
- No answer (unknown) – 4.7%

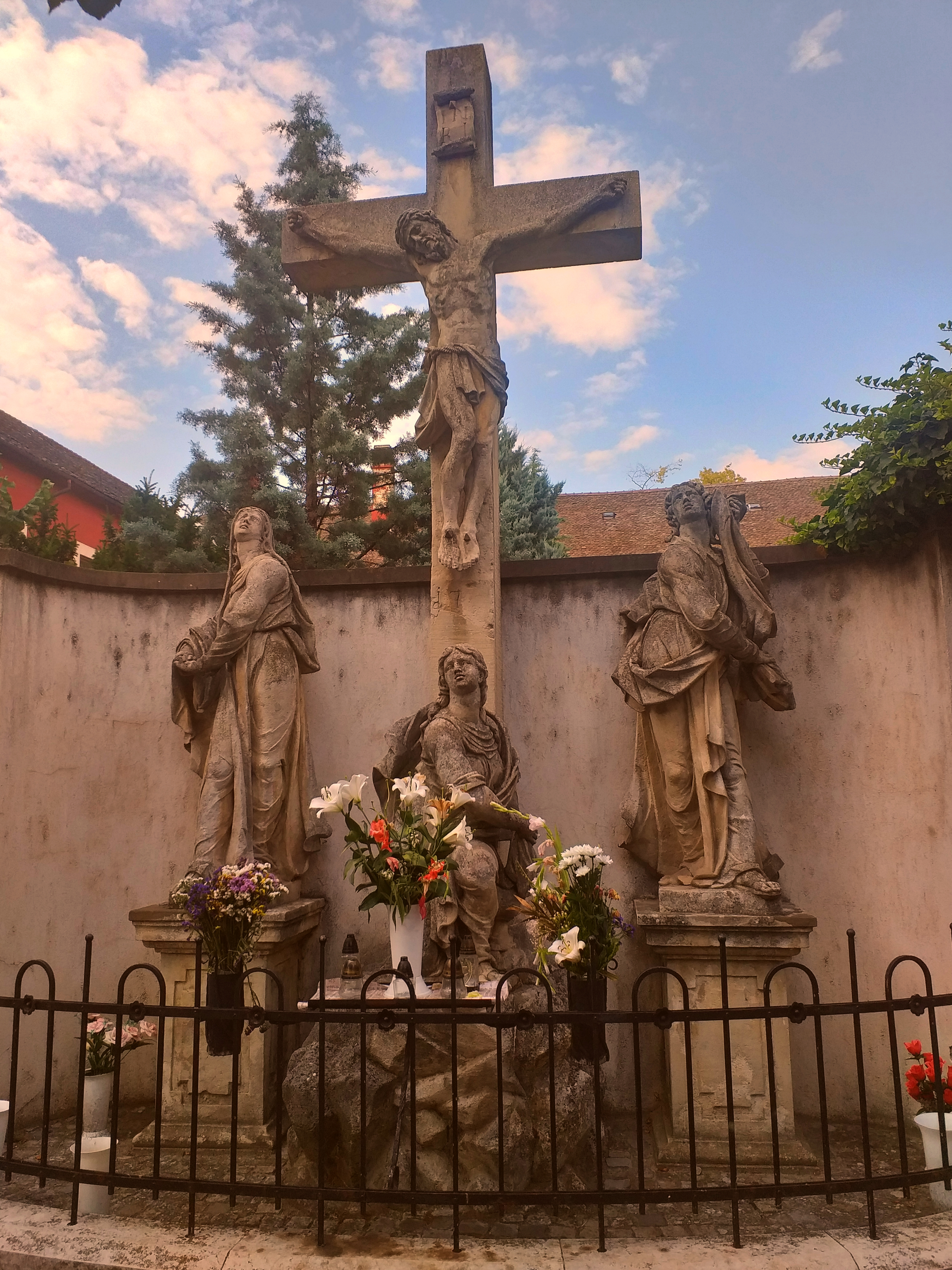
Crucifix in Szeged 'Felsőváros' (Upper Town), in the Munkácsy Street

== Religion ==
Religions (2001 census):

- Roman Catholic – 54.5%
- Calvinist – 6.7%
- Lutheran – 1.6%
- Greek Catholic – 0.6%
- Others (Christian) – 1.3%
- Others (non-Christian) – 0.4%
- Atheist – 21.8%
- No answer (unknown) – 13.1%

== Economy ==
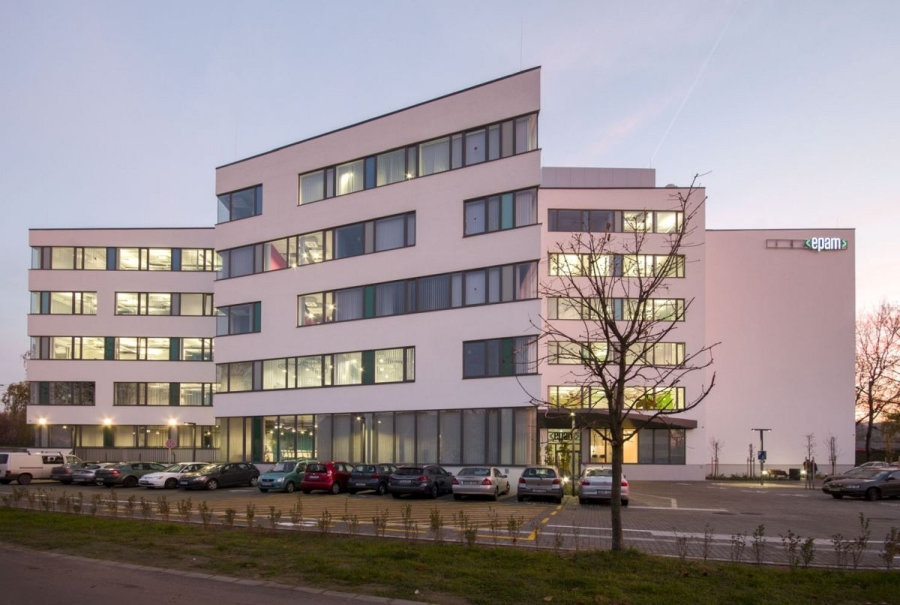
The new office building of the EPAM Systems, completed and opened in September 2017

Szeged is one of the centres of food industry in Hungary, especially known for its paprika and companies like Pick Szeged, Sole-Mizo, Bonafarm etc. Moreover, BYD Auto announced plans to begin manufacturing cars in Szeged by the second quarter of 2026.

Other notable companies having their headquarters in Szeged are AMSY International, RRE – Szeged, Optiwella, Generál Printing House, RotaPack, Sanex Pro, Agroplanta, Karotin, Florin, Quadrotex and Szeplast. Others, like ContiTech, Duna-Dráva Cement, Szatmári Malom and Europe Match, are not based in the city, but have production facilities there.

The Hangár Expo and Conference Centre provides space for international exhibitions and conferences.

=== Largest employers ===
#	Employer	# of Employees
1	University of Szeged	5,000 <
2	Pick Szeged	2,000–4,999
3	Sole-Mizo	1,000–1,999
4	Tisza-Volán	1,000–1,999
5	EDF-Démász	500–999
6	Suli-Host	500–999
7	Szegedi Közlekedési Társaság	500–999
8	Szegedi Szefo	500–999
9	Coop	300–499
10	Engie	300–499

Historical unemployment rate between 2000 and 2016
Year	Unemployment rate (%)
2000	5.17%
2001	4.83%
2002	4.22%
2003	4.32%
2004	4.67%
2005	5.01%
2006	4.89%
2007	4.25%
2008	4.60%
2009	4.91%
2010	6.26%
2011	6.50%
2012	6.42%
2013	6.89%
2014	4.17%
2015	4.42%
2016	4.14%

== Transport ==
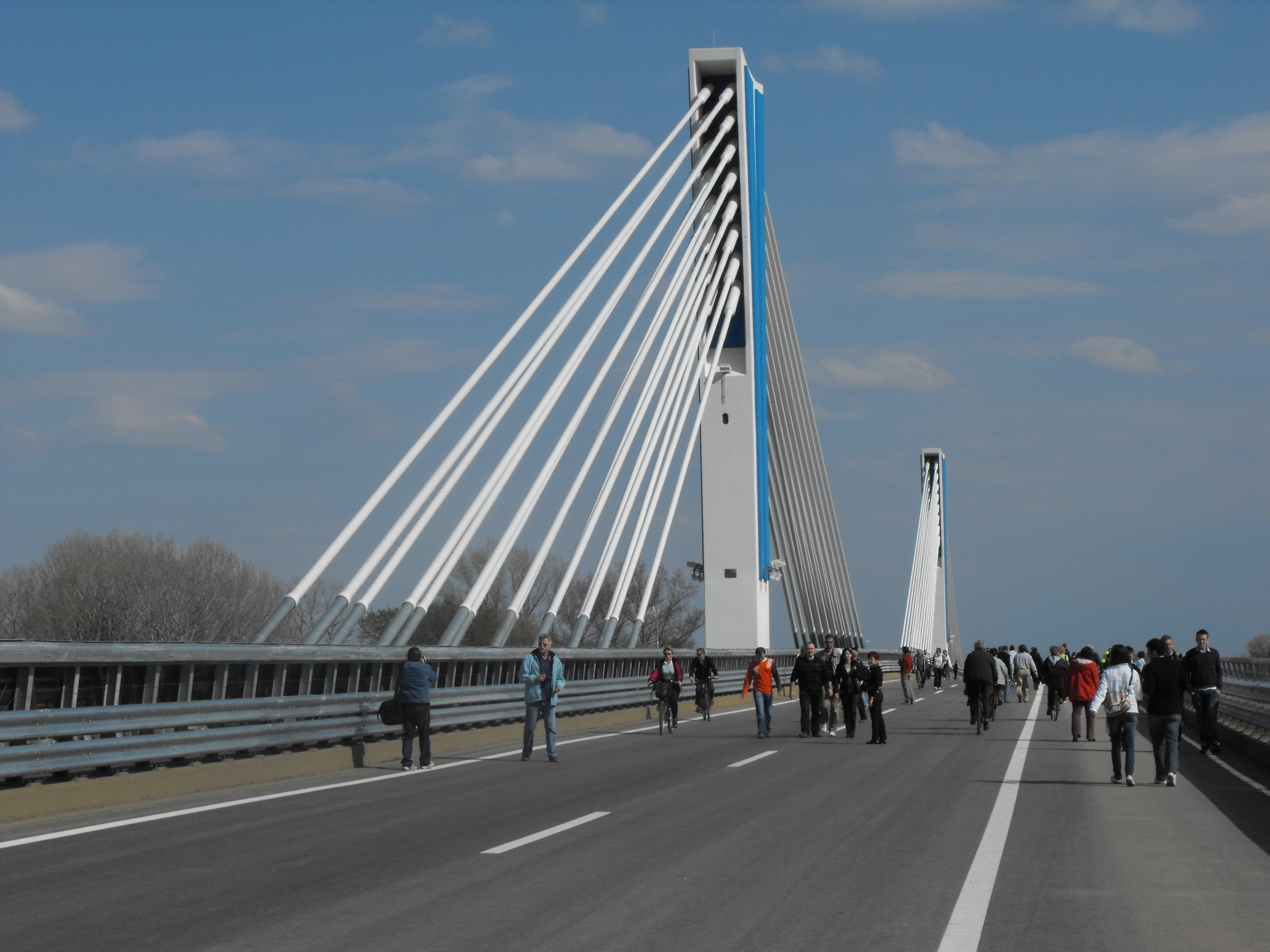
The Ferenc Móra Bridge on the M43 Motorway near Szeged

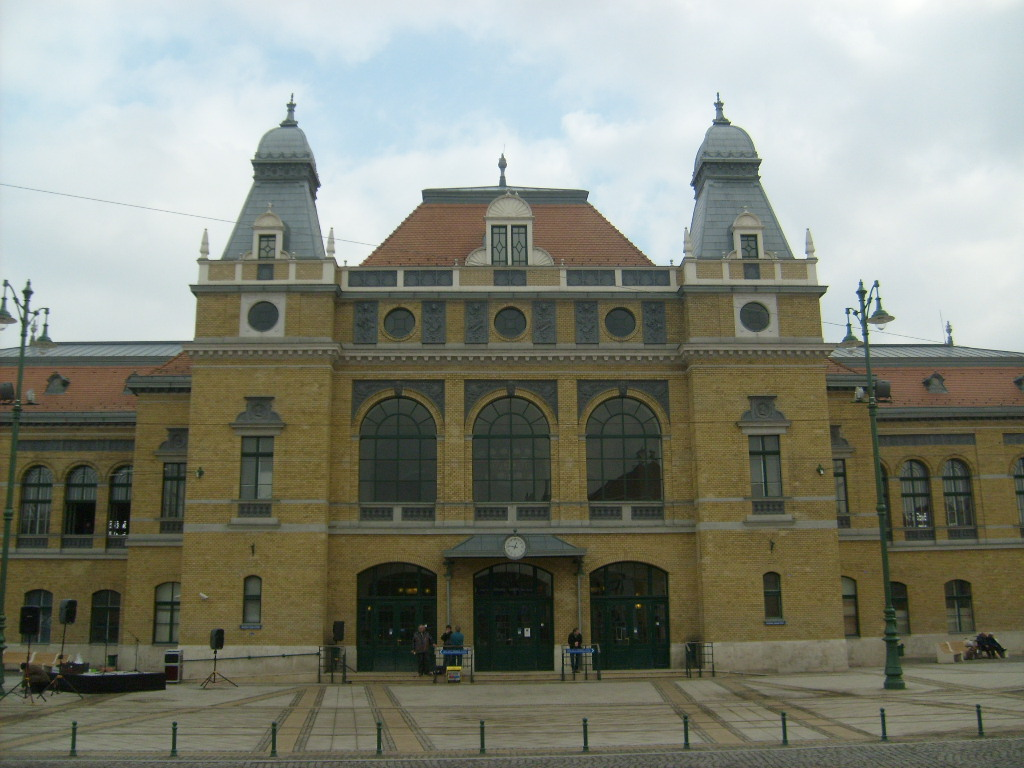
Szeged Railway Station

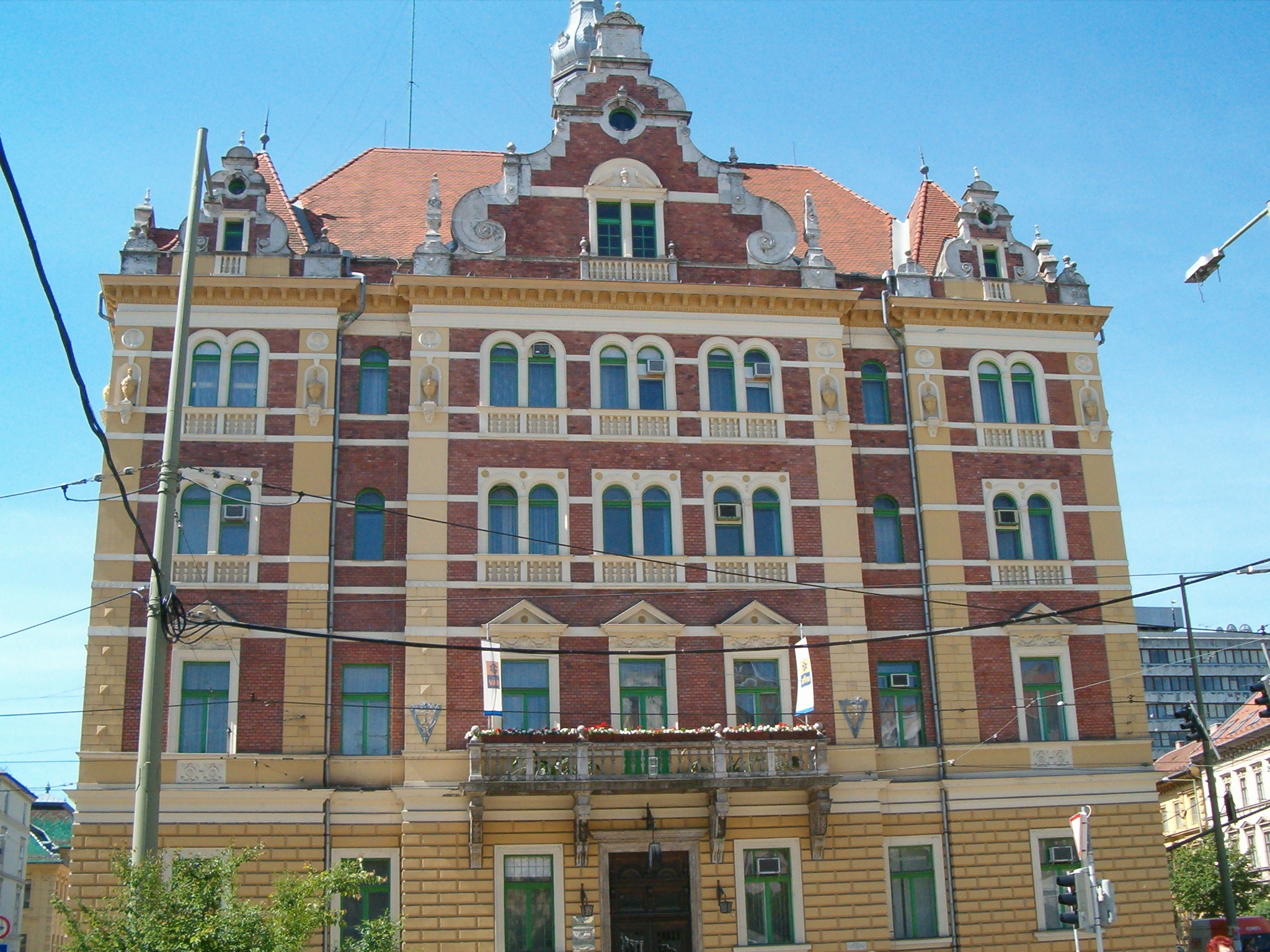
The Directorate of MÁV in Szeged (designed by Ferenc Pfaff in 1894)

Szeged is the most important transportation hub in the Southern Great Plain. Two motorways, M5 and M43, lie along the city border. Through the M5 Motorway Szeged is connected to Kecskemét, Kiskunfélegyháza and Budapest to the north and to Subotica, Novi Sad and Belgrade in Serbia to the south. The M43 Motorway – which splits from the M5 Motorway near Szeged – connects the city via Makó to Arad and Timișoara in Romania. In addition, there are other roads running from the city to Makó and Nagylak (main road 43), to Röszke (main road 5), to Kiskunfélegyháza (main road 5), to Ásotthalom and Baja (main road 55) and to Hódmezővásárhely, Orosháza and Békéscsaba (main road 47).

The Budapest-Szeged-rail line is an important rail connection, as well as the railway lines 121 (to Makó), 135 (to Hódmezővásárhely), 136 (to Röszke) and 140 (to Kiskunfélegyháza).

A tram-train system was constructed and inaugurated in November 2021, connecting Szeged with the neighbouring Hódmezővásárhely, thus creating the second most populous urban agglomeration in the country, after the capital. There was a proposal for its extension, even through the Serbian border, to Subotica.

The city is also a common stop for national and international long-distance buses.

=== Motorways ===
- M5
- M43

=== Railways ===
- 121 (to Makó)
- 135 (to Hódmezővásárhely)
- 136 (to Röszke)
- 140 (to Kiskunfélegyháza).

=== Airport ===
Szeged Airport is the international airport of Szeged.

=== Public transport ===
Public transport in Szeged is provided by Szeged Transport Ltd. (Hungarian: Szegedi Közlekdési Társaság or SZKT), owned by the municipal government, and Volánbusz, owned by the national government. Forming the backbone of SZKT's network are 5 tram lines and 6 trolleybus lines, which are supplemented by 38 bus lines. Hungarian State Railways operates regional and intercity trains, as well as international trains to Subotica.

== Sport ==
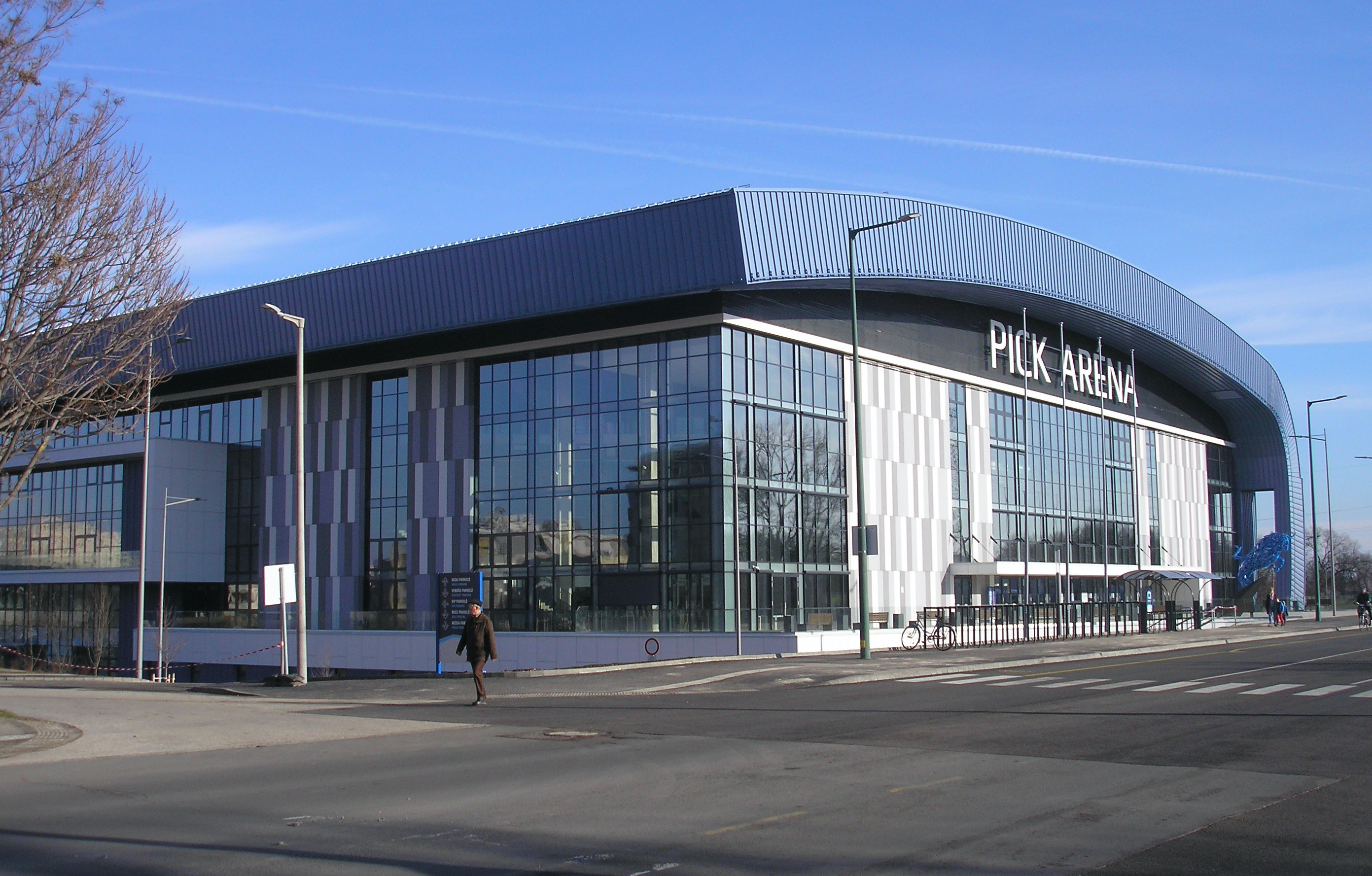
Pick Aréna, the city's main indoor hall, home venue of the SC Pick Szeged handball team

=== Handball ===
The most popular sport in the city is handball. The city has one well-known club the 2013–14 EHF Cup-winner SC Pick Szeged playing in the Nemzeti Bajnokság I. They play at the Pick Aréna, opened in 2021.

=== Association football ===
The second most popular sport is football in the city. Szeged had several clubs playing in the top level Hungarian league, the Nemzeti Bajnokság I. These are Szegedi AK, Szegedi Honvéd SE. The only currently operating club, Szeged 2011 play in the Nemzeti Bajnokság II.

- Szeged 2011, currently competing in the 2018–19 Nemzeti Bajnokság III
- Szegedi Egységes Oktatási Labdarúgó SC, currently competing in the 2018–19 Nemzeti Bajnokság III
- Szegedi VSE, currently competing in the Csongrád county championship
- Szegedi EAC, defunct
- Szegedi EOL SC, active
- Szegedi AK, defunct
- Szegedi Dózsa SC, defunct
- Szegedi Honvéd SE, defunct

=== Speedway ===
Motorcycle speedway has had a long association with the city. The first track was at the SZEAC athletics stadium (also known as the Felső Tisza-parti Stadion or Városi stadion), which was located where the Pick Aréna is today. The venue hosted finals of the Hungarian Individual Speedway Championship.

From 1978, the Volán speedway club moved to a new track built on Napos út at Béke telepi. This venue held important events, including qualifying rounds of the Speedway World Championship in 1983 and 1984 and a qualifying round of the Speedway World Team Cup in 1988 and 1990. The track closed, partly because of noise issues in a residential area, resulting in the speedway moving out of the city, 25 kilometres west, near to Mórahalom (46°10′14″N 19°54′49″E).

=== Basketball ===
The city has a basketball team, Szedeák, which completes in the Nemzeti Bajnokság I/A, part of FIBA Europe.

== Main sights ==
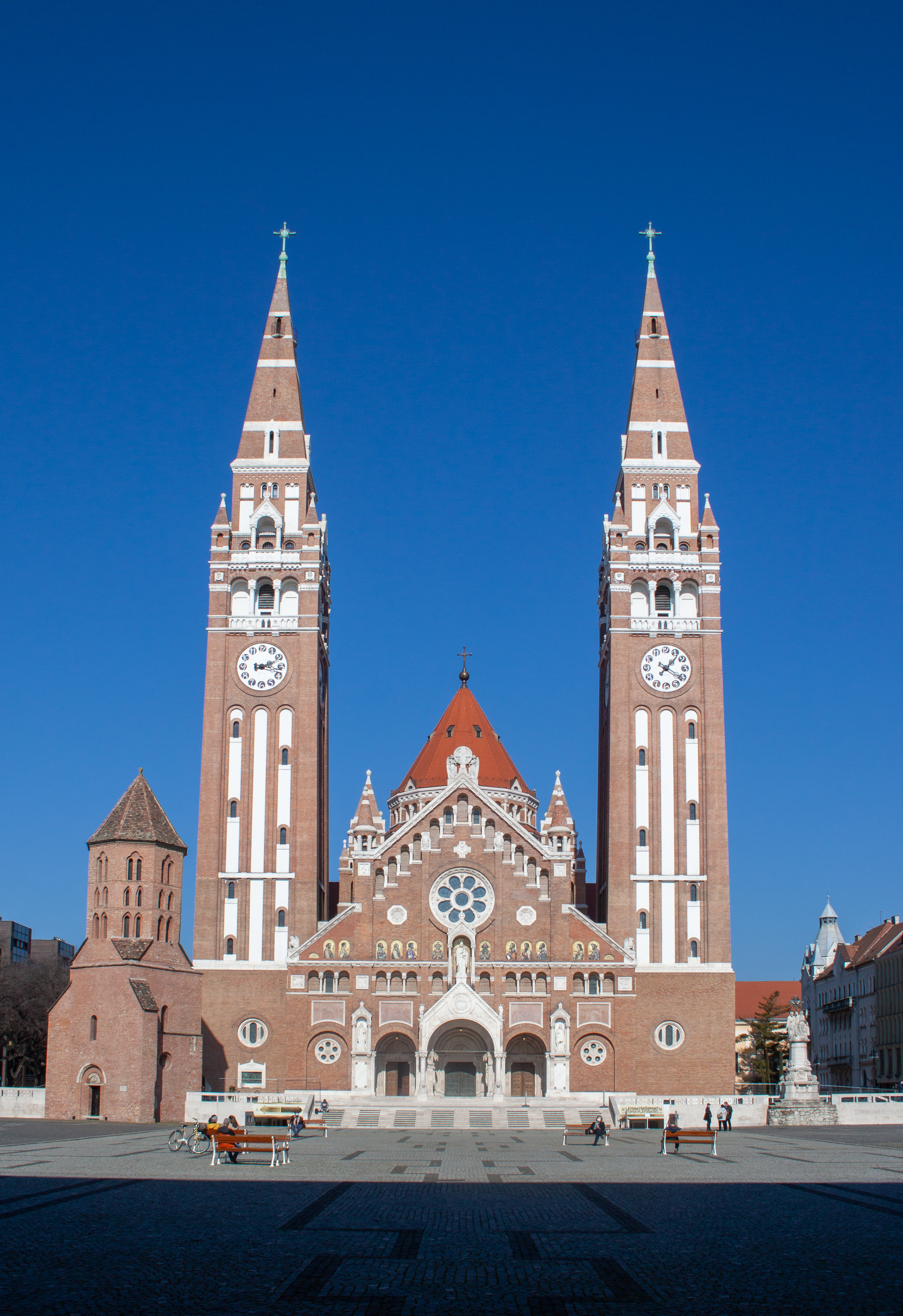
Votive Church (1930)

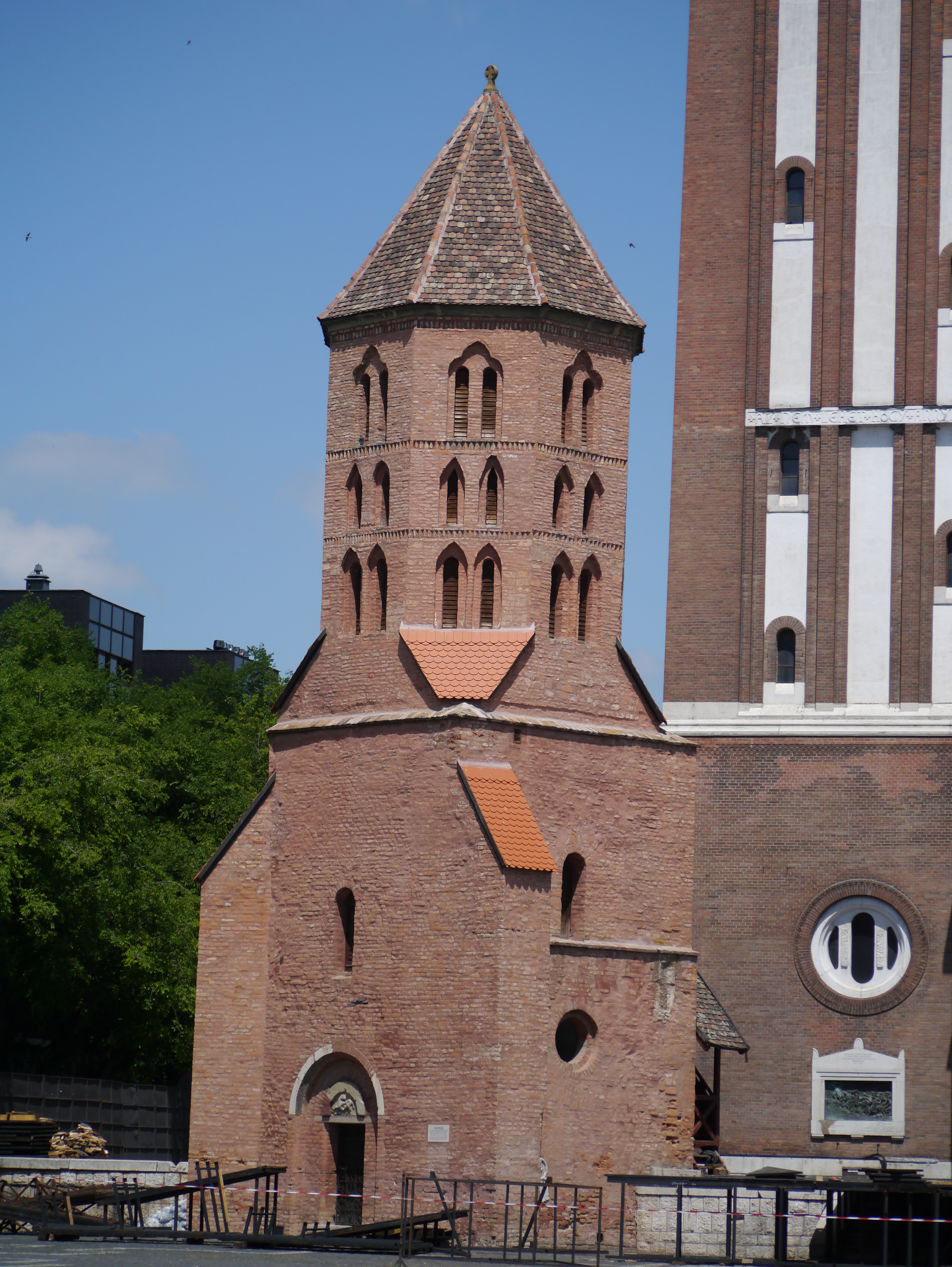
Dömötör Tower (11th century)

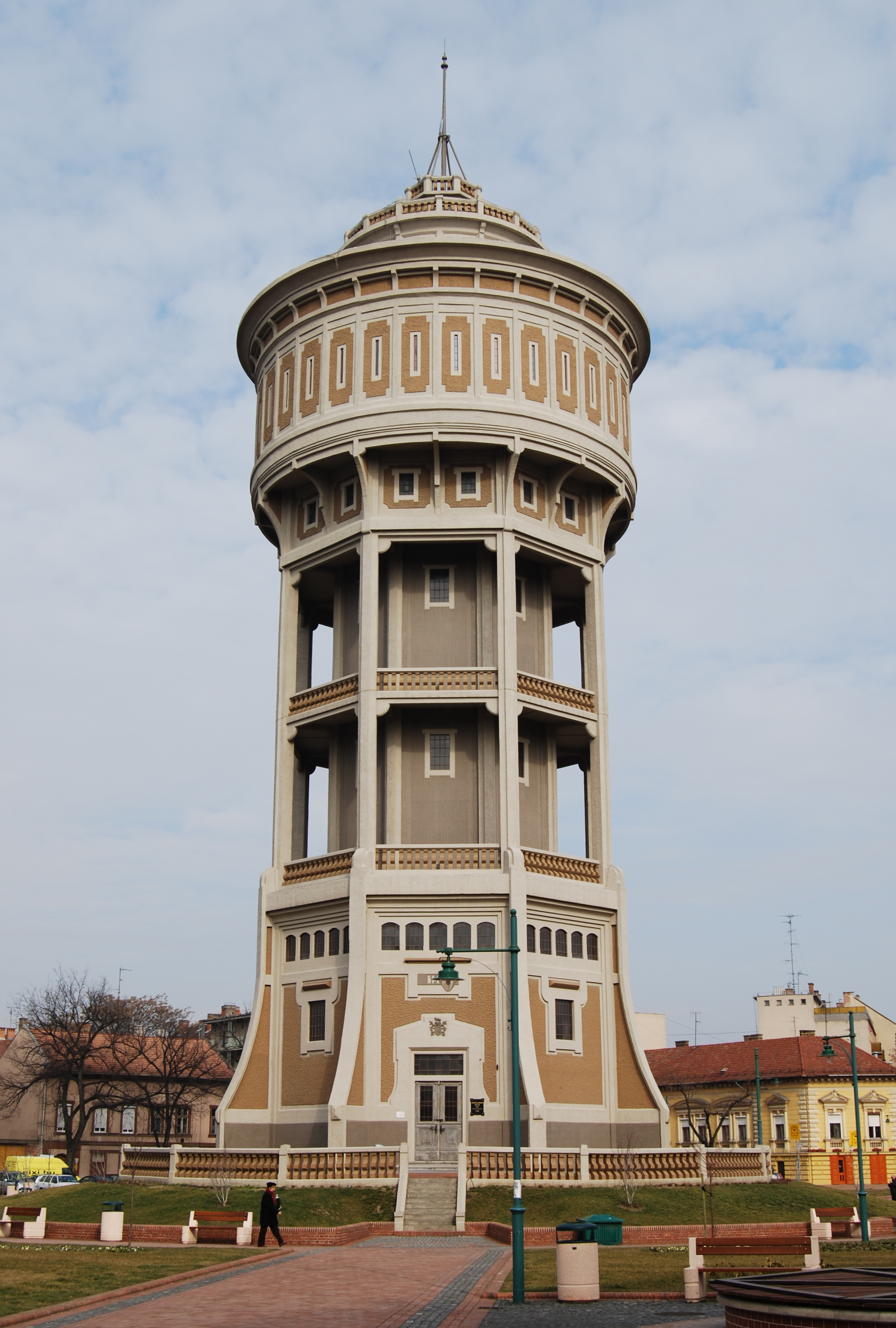
The Water Tower of Szent István Square (1904)

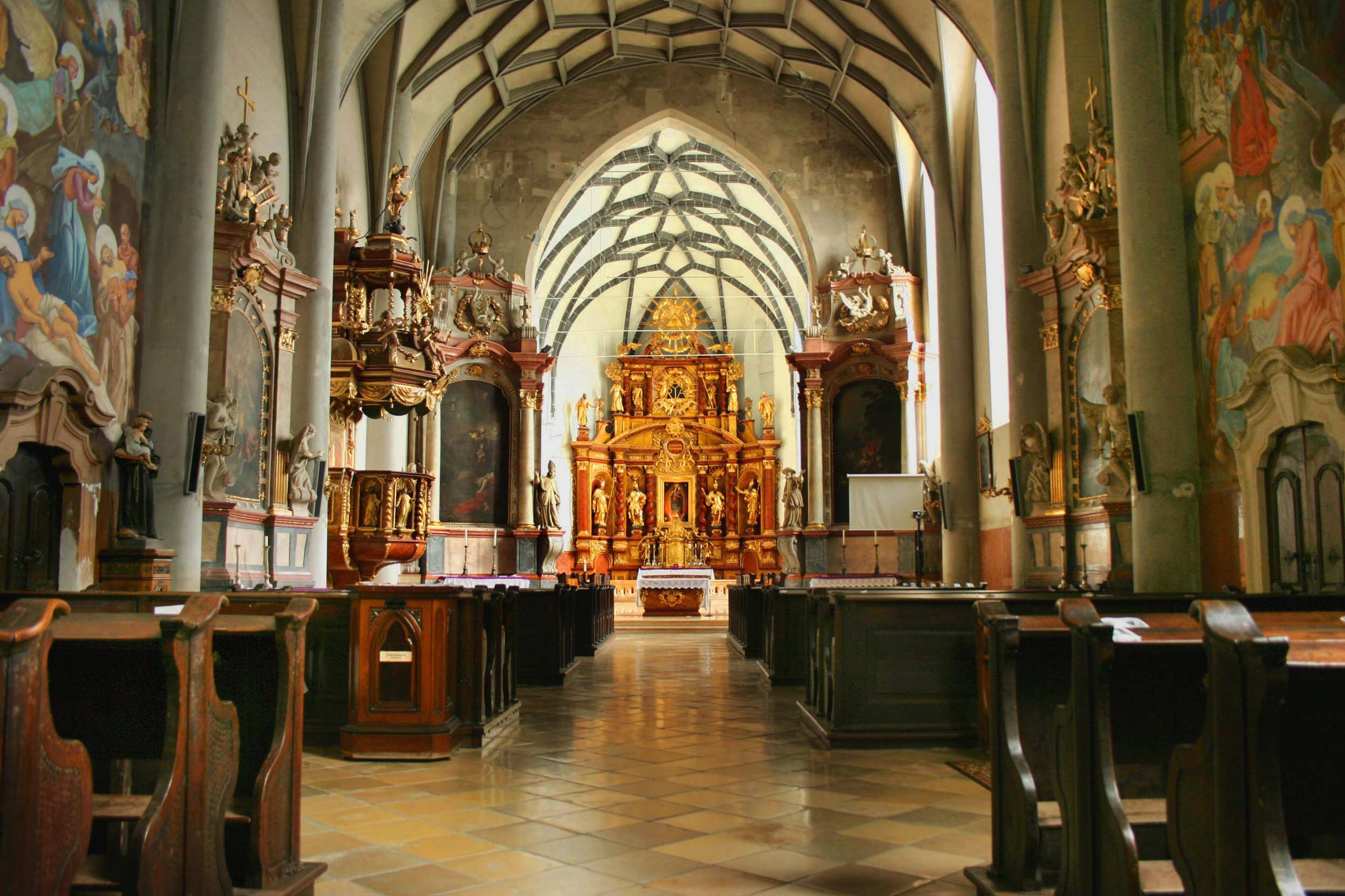
Church of Grey Friars (Gothic, 15th century)

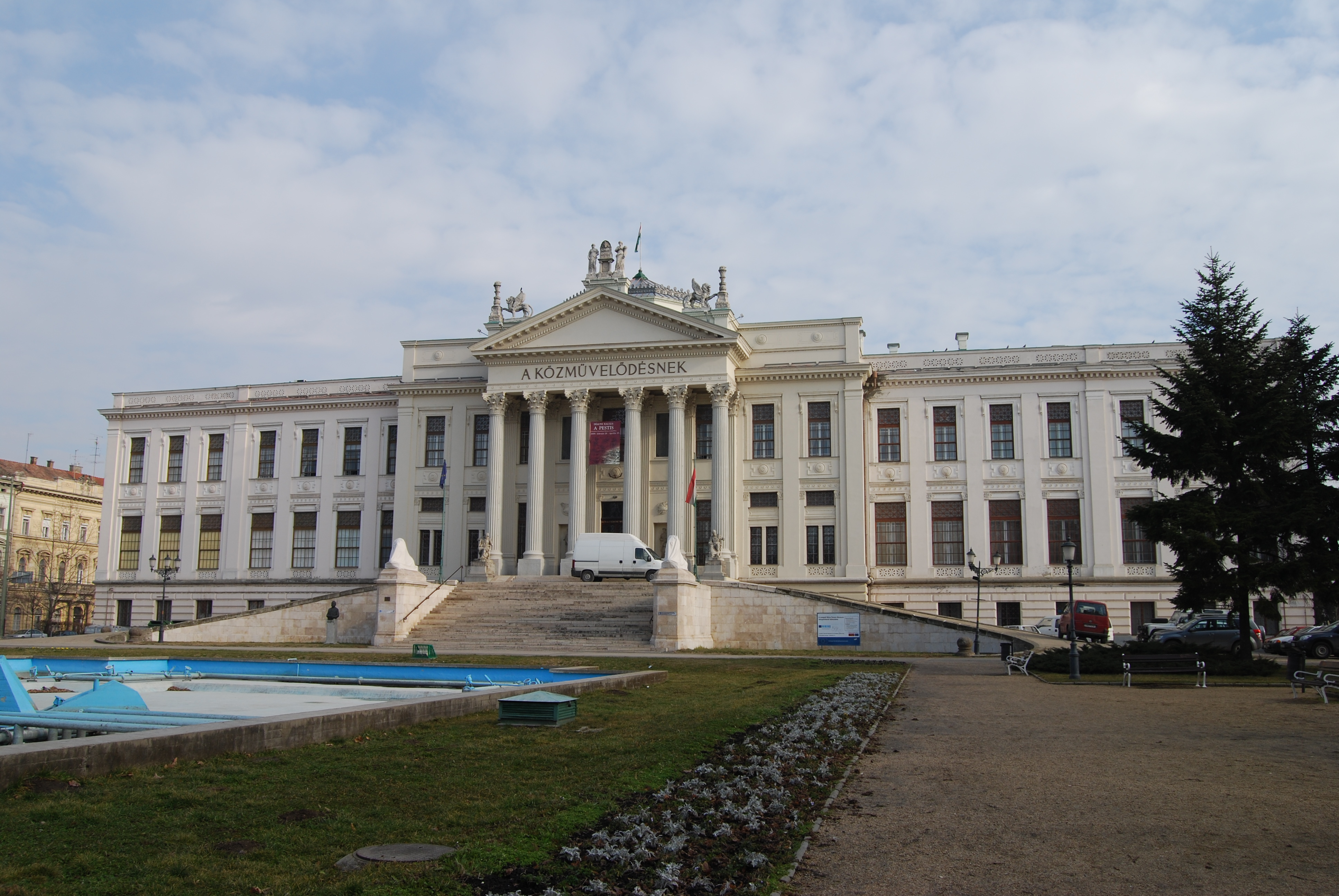
Ferenc Móra Museum (1896)

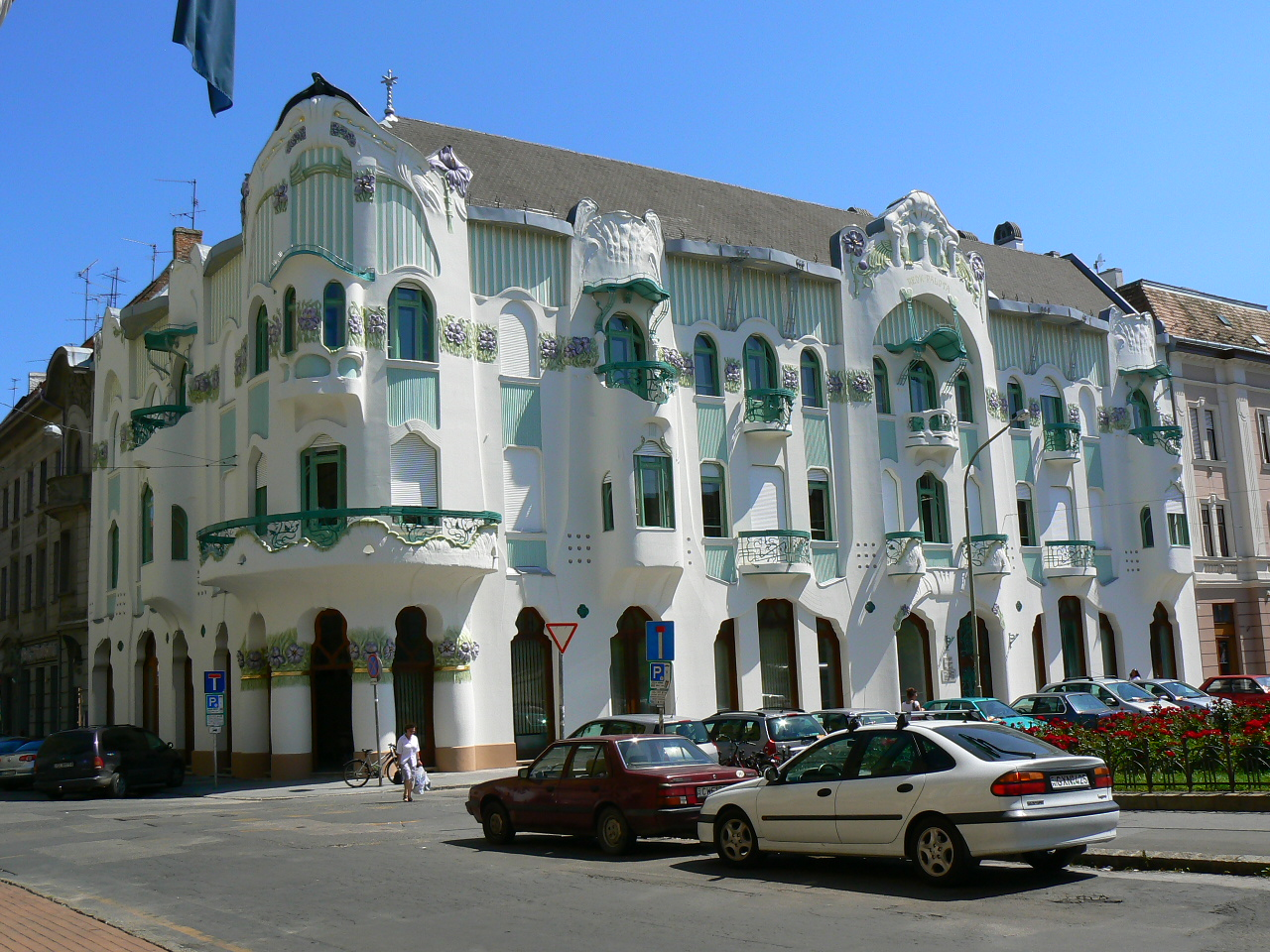
Reök palace (1907)

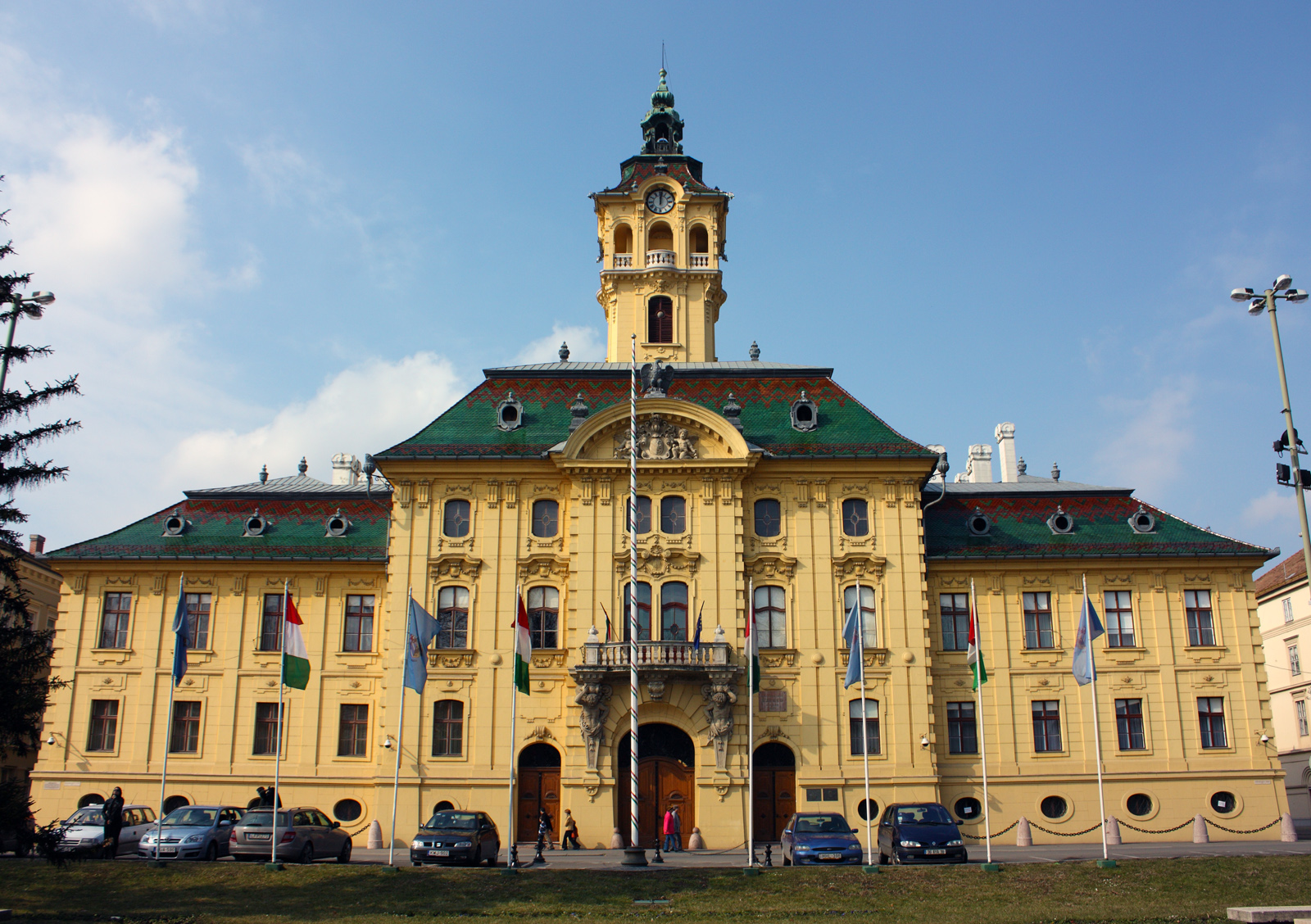
City Hall (1728, 1804, 1883)

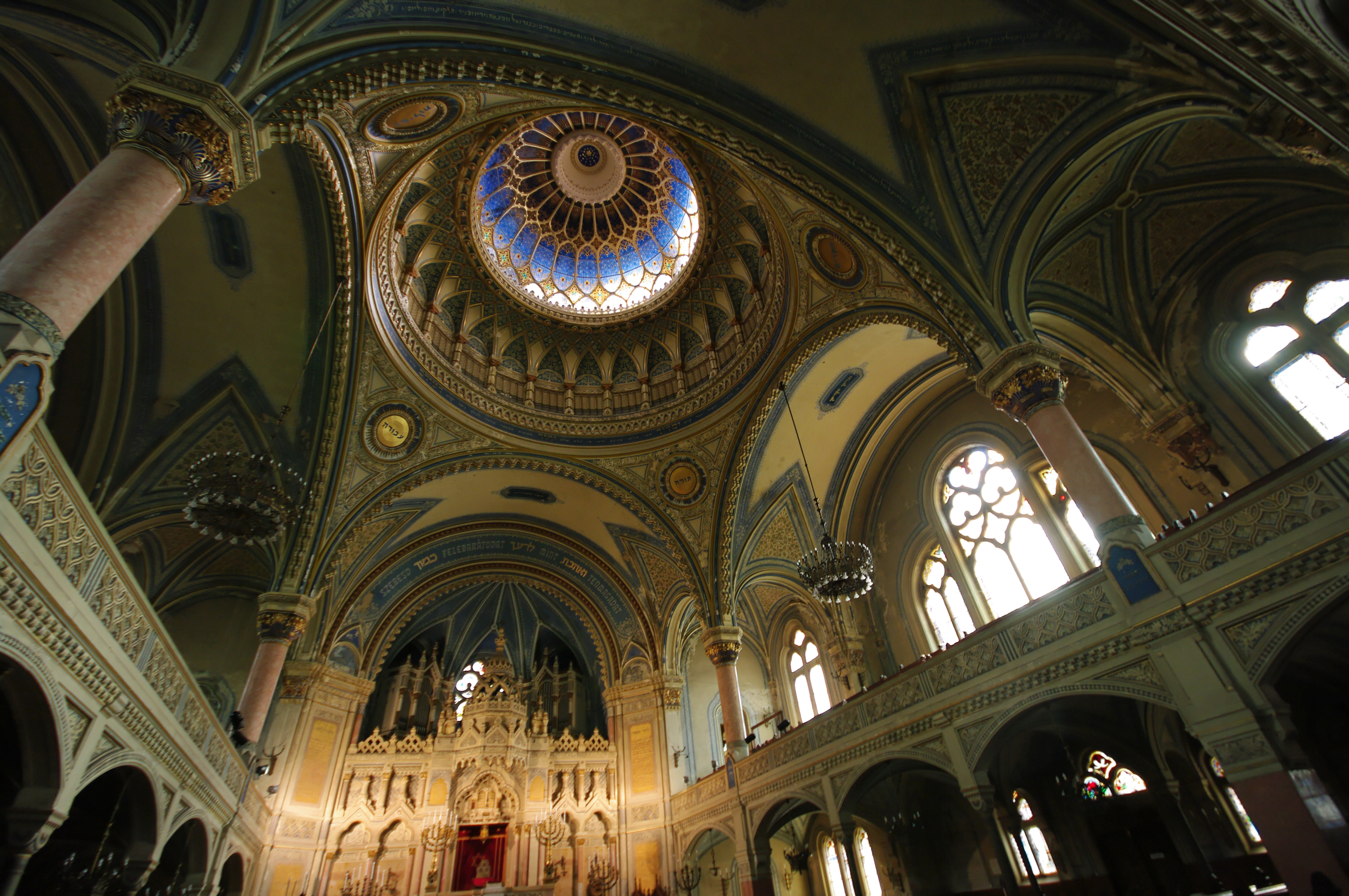
Szeged Synagogue

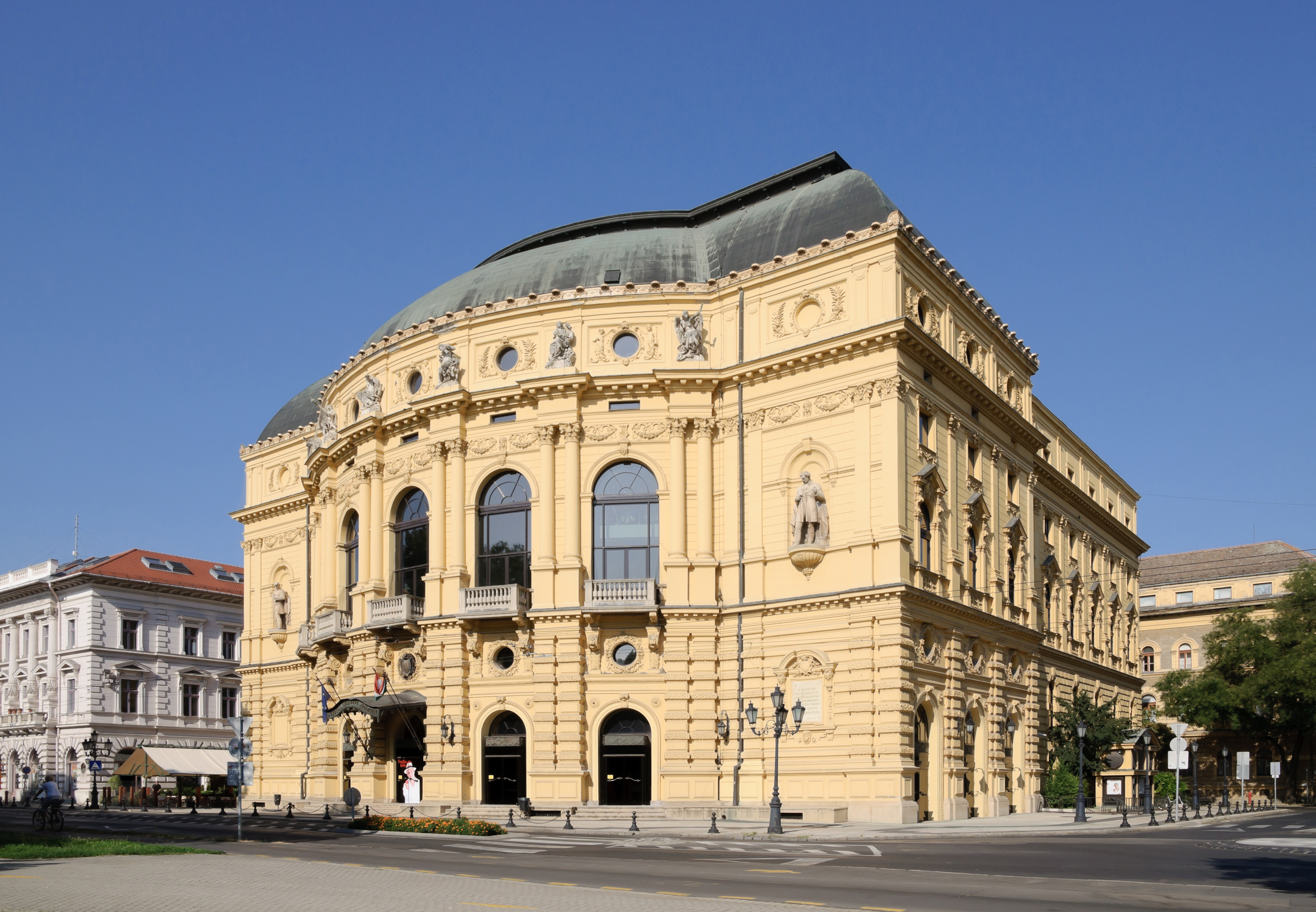
National Theatre of Szeged

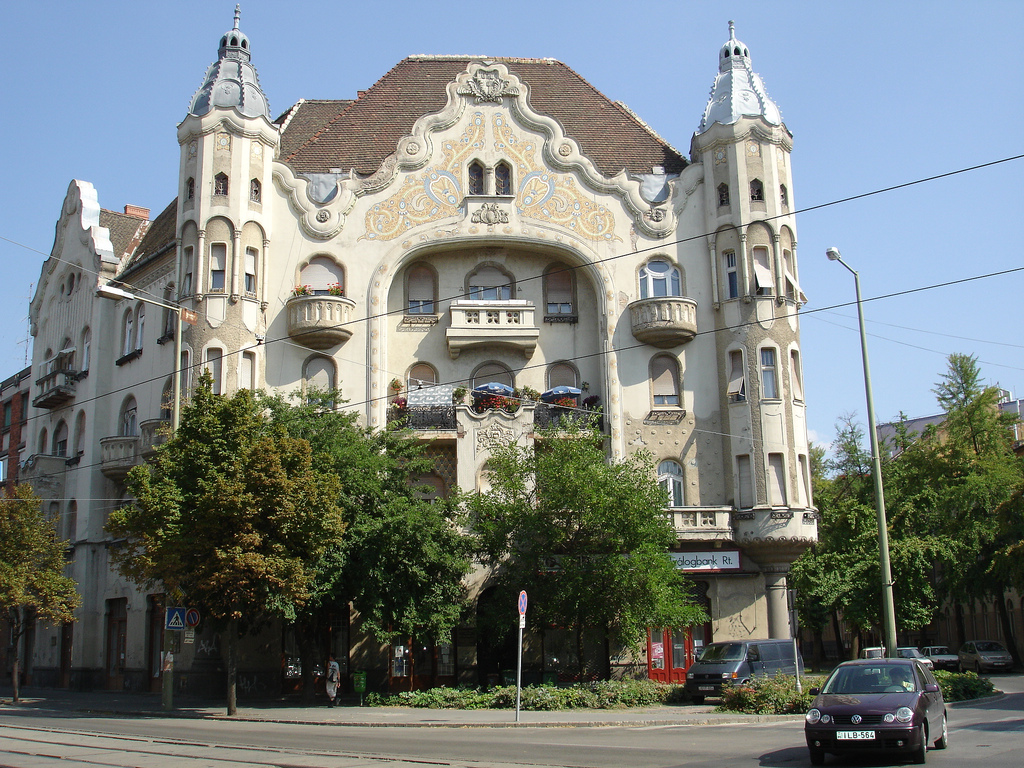
Gróf-palace (1913)

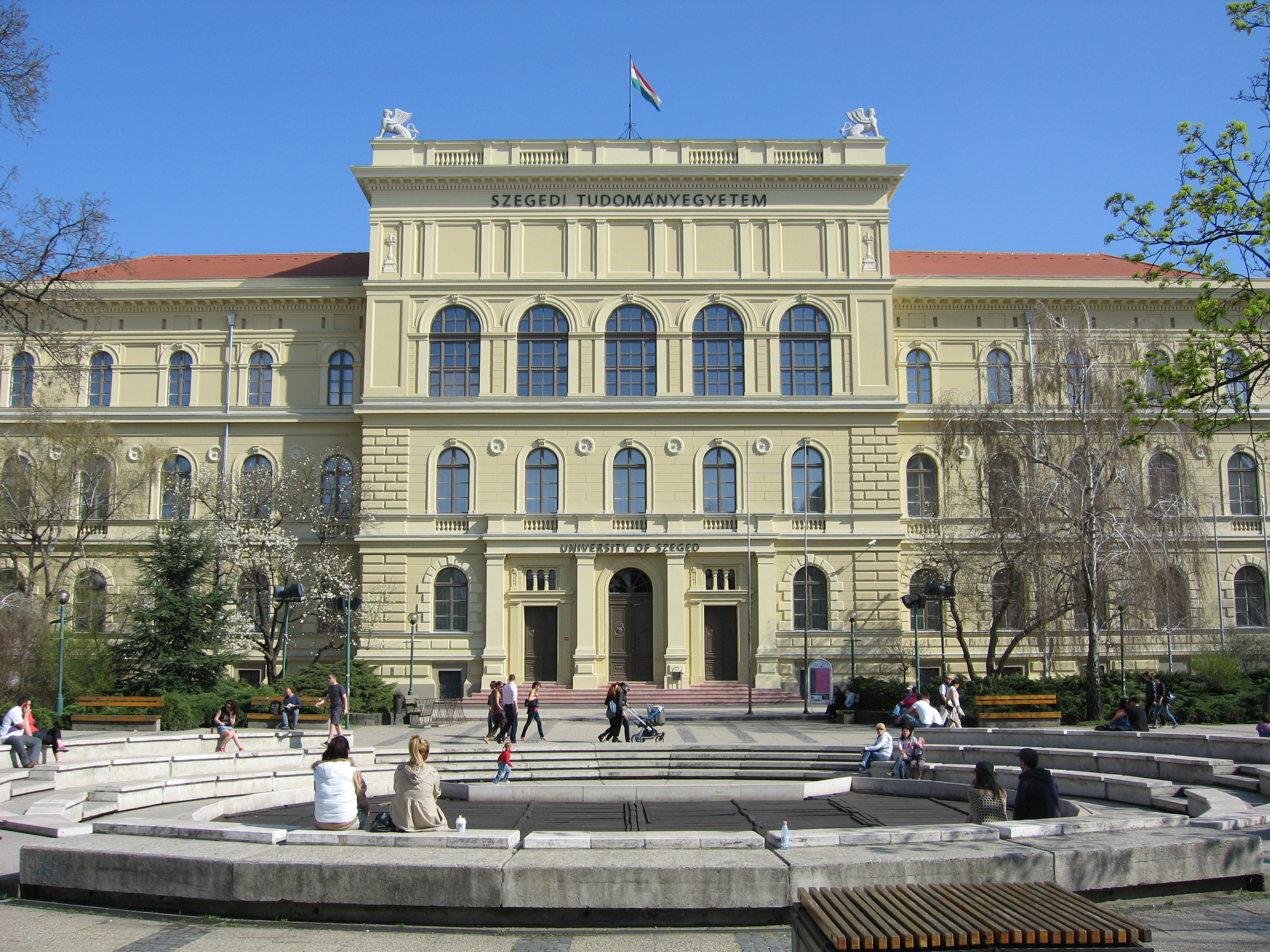
The Main Building of the University

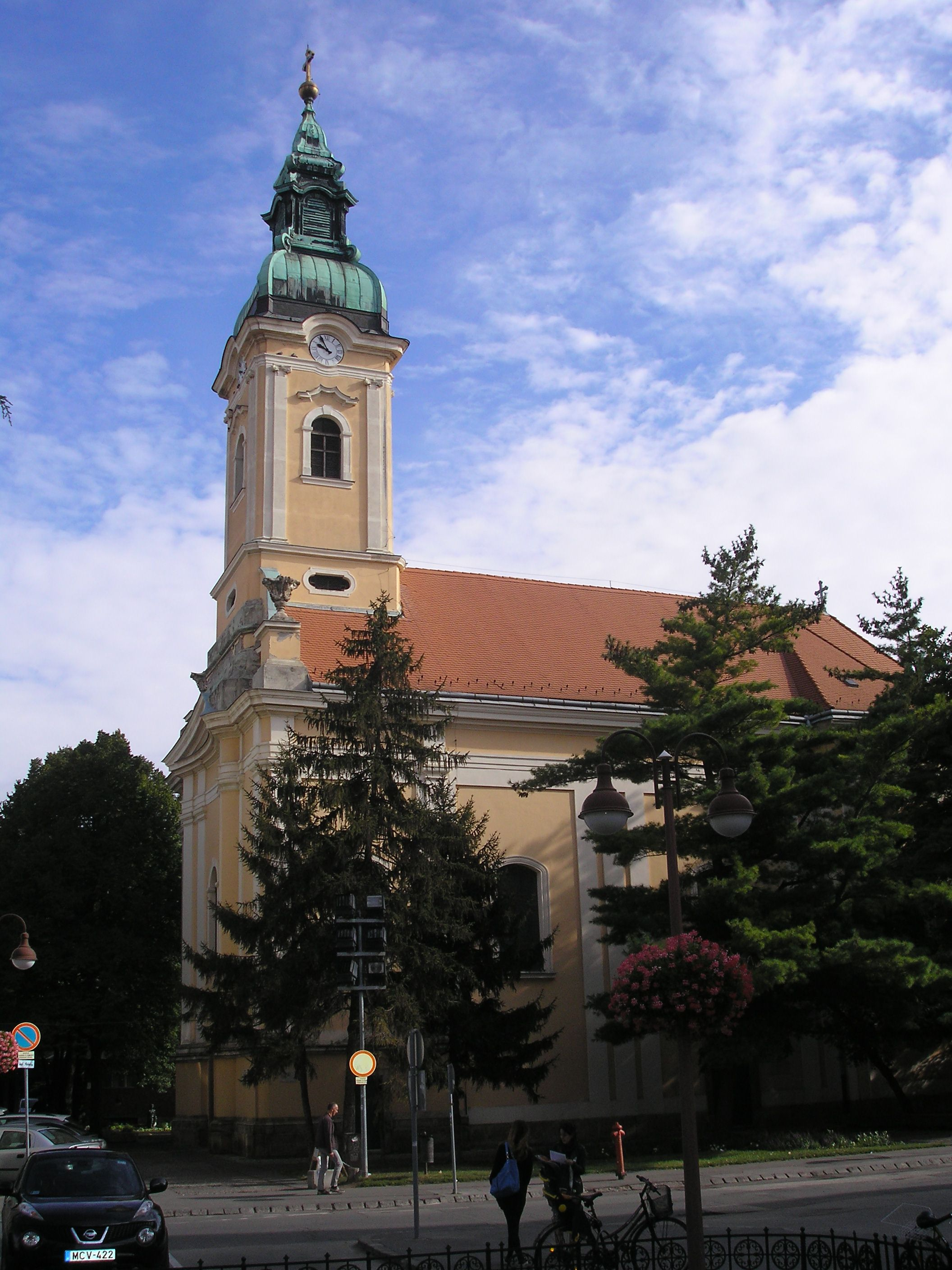
Saint Nicholas Serbian Orthodox Church (1781)

== Politics ==
The current mayor of Szeged is László Botka (Association for Szeged).

The local Municipal Assembly, elected at the 2024 local government elections, is made up of 28 members (1 Mayor, 19 Individual constituencies MEPs and 8 Compensation List MEPs) divided into political parties and alliances:

Party	Seats	Current Municipal Assembly
Association for Szeged (Note: Supported by MSZP-Momentum-DK-LMP-Jobbik.)	19	M
Fidesz-KDNP	7	
Hungarian Two-tailed Dog Party (MKKP)	2	

=== List of mayors ===
List of City Mayors from 1990:

Member	Party	Ideology	Term of office
Pál Lippai	Fidesz-SZDSZ	liberal	1990–1994
István Szalay	MSZP	socialist	1994–1998
László Bartha	Fidesz-FKgP-MDF	national conservative	1998–2002
László Botka	MSZP	socialist, liberal	2002–
László Botka	Independent		2002–

== Media ==
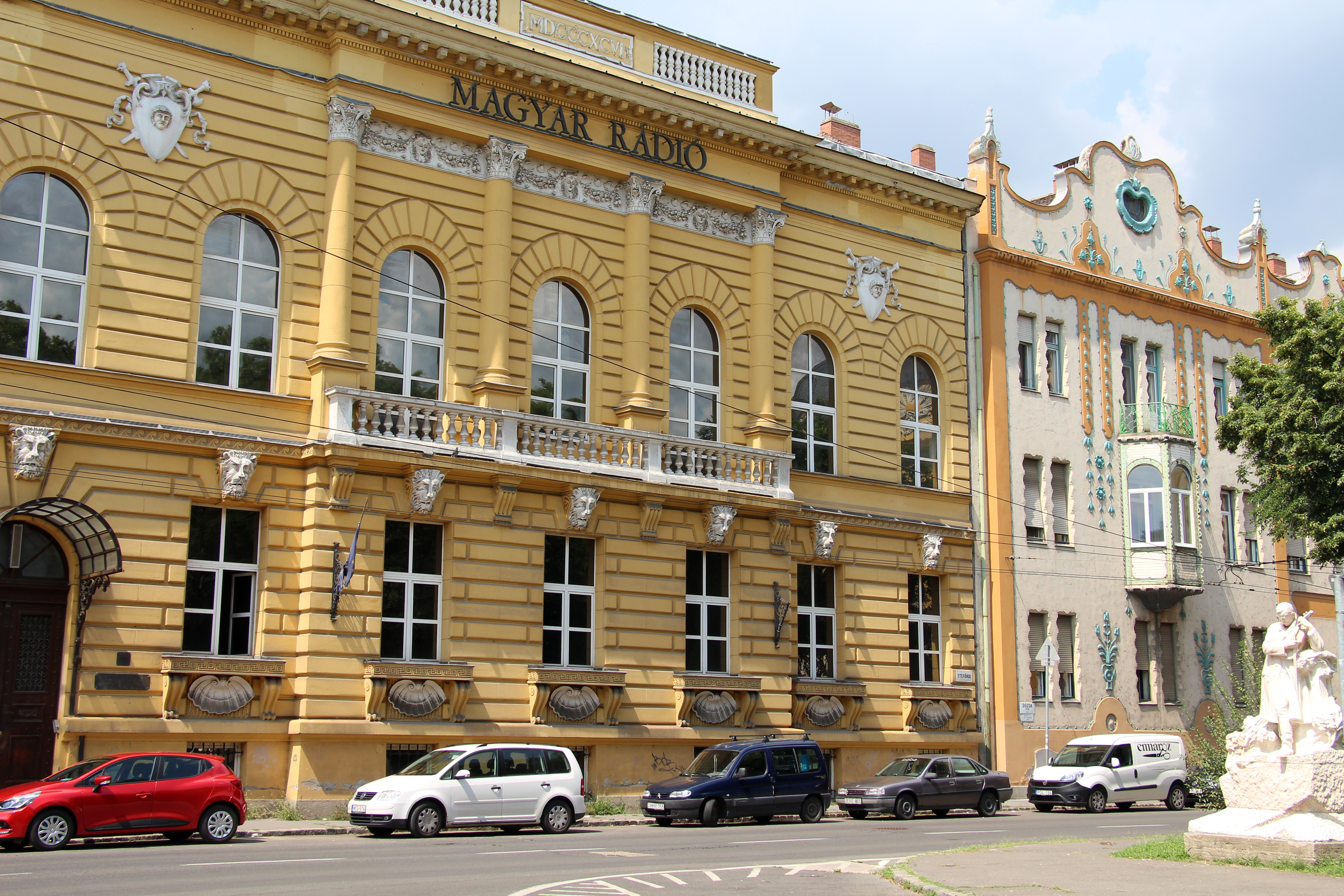
Hungarian Radio headquarters

The city offers a wide range of media – television and radio stations, and print and online newspapers.

=== TV stations ===
- Szeged TV
- Tarjáni Kábeltévé Stúdió
- TiszapART TV
- Telin Televízió

=== Radio stations ===
- "Rádió 88" FM 95,4MHz
- All in Party Radio
- Rádió Mi, 89,9MHz
- Lánchíd Rádió, FM 100,2MHz
- MR1 Kossuth Rádió, FM 90,3MHz
- MR2 Petőfi Rádió, 104,6MHz
- MR3 Bartók Rádió, 105,7MHz
- Dankó Rádió, 93,1MHz
- Rádió1, 87,9MHz

=== Daily newspapers and news portals ===
- Délmagyarország (delmagyar.hu)
- szeged.hu
- szegeder.hu
- szegedma.hu
- szeged365.hu
- szegedify.com

== Notable people ==
=== Born in Szeged ===
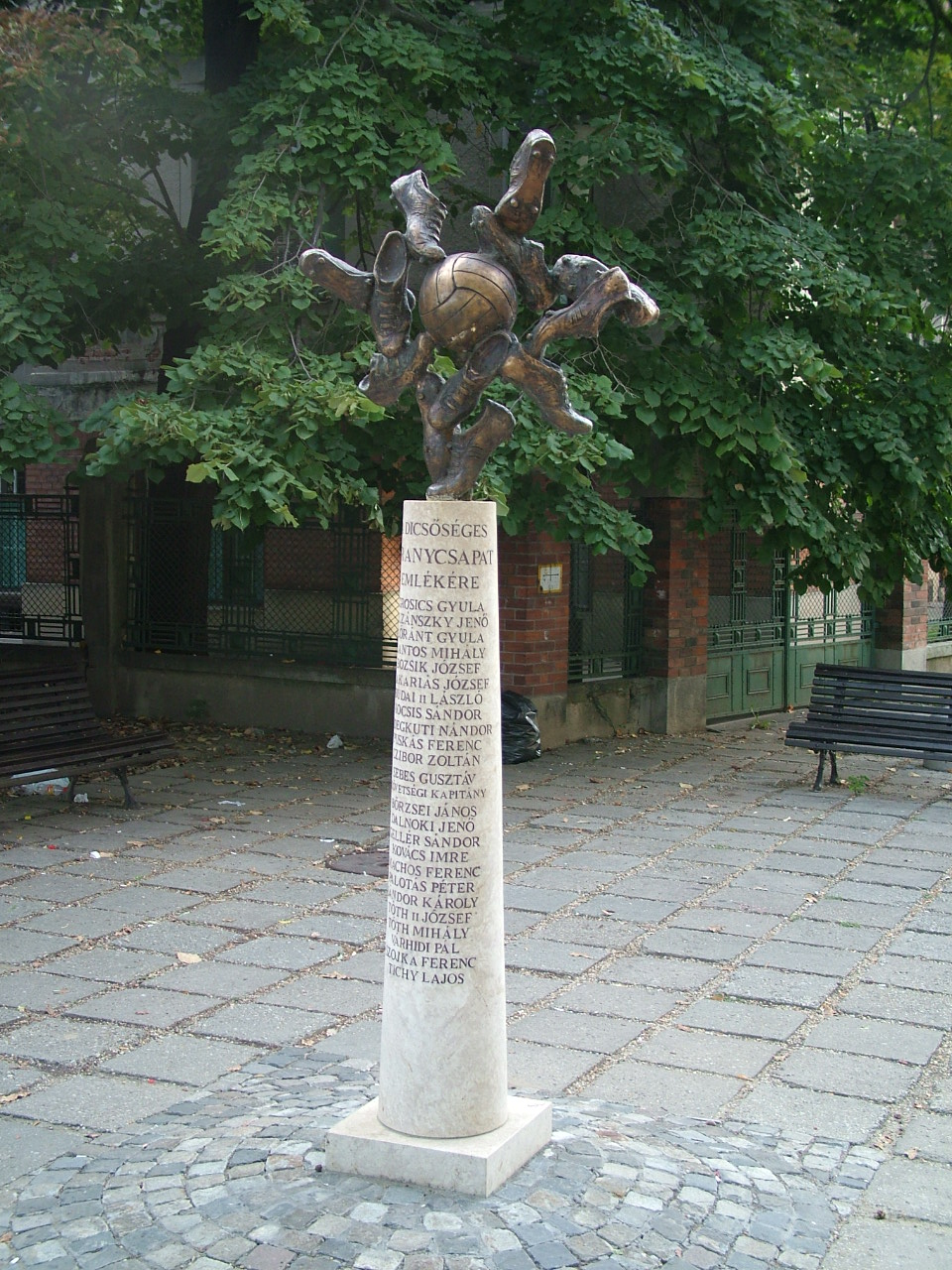
A memorial of the Golden Team, the legendary football team of Hungary

- László Ábrahám (1943–2025), lawyer
- Adrián Annus (1975), hammer thrower
- Gábor Agárdy (1922–2006), actor
- Miloš Babić (1904–1968), artist
- Béla Balázs (1884–1949), writer, poet, film critic
- Zsolt Becsey (1964), politician
- Joseph Csaky (1888–1971), sculptor
- Krisztián Cser (1977), opera singer, physicist
- Attila Czene (1974), Olympic champion medley swimmer
- János Csonka (1852–1939), engineer, co-inventor of the carburetor
- Mihály Erdélyi (1895–1979), operetta composer
- Sophie Evans (1976), adult movie star
- Ivan Fellegi (1935), Chief Statistician of Canada
- Rajmund Fodor (1976), Olympic champion water polo player
- Jenő Huszka (1875–1960), composer
- Éva Janikovszky (1926–2003), writer
- Ferenc Joachim (1882–1964), painter
- Gyula Juhász (1883–1937), poet
- Esther Jungreis, Orthodox Jewish outreach speaker
- Judith Karasz (1912–1977), photographer and Bauhaus graduate
- Györgyi Lang (1957–2023), actress and singer, member of the Hungarian music duo Pa-Dö-Dő.
- Attila Lőte (1934–2026), actor
- Moses Max Löw (1857–?), architect
- Géza Maróczy (1870–1951), chess grand master
- Anita Márton (1989), shot putter
- Tamás Molnár (1975), Olympic champion water polo player
- Nickolas Muray (born Miklós Mandl; 1892–1965), Hungarian-born American photographer and Olympic fencer
- Róbert Nagy (1967), speedway rider
- László Paskai (1927–2015), Archbishop of Esztergom
- Szilvia Peter Szabo (1982), singer
- Willy Pogany (1882–1955), illustrator
- György Sebők (1922–1999), pianist
- Julius Stahel (1825–1912), American Civil War general and diplomat
- Hanna Tetteh (1967), Foreign minister of the Republic of Ghana
- Péter Ágnes (1983), singer
- Olivér Várhelyi (1972), lawyer and diplomat
- Marianne Varnay (1898), architect https://architectuul.com/architect/marianne-varnay
- Attila Vajda (1983), Olympic champion canoer
- Vilmos Zsigmond (1930), cinematographer

=== Lived in Szeged ===
- Mihály Babits, poet, writer
- Lipót Fejér, mathematician
- Ferenc Fricsay, conductor
- Alfréd Haar, mathematician
- Attila József, poet
- László Kalmár, mathematician
- Katalin Karikó, Nobel prize winner biochemist
- Dezső Kosztolányi, poet, novelist
- Peter Leko, chess grandmaster
- Immanuel Löw, rabbi, Judaic scholar, politician
- Leopold Löw, rabbi, historian and Judaic scholar
- Kálmán Mikszáth, writer
- Ferenc Móra, writer, archaeologist
- Miklós Radnóti, poet
- Frigyes Riesz, mathematician
- Albert Szent-Györgyi, Nobel prize winner chemist and biologist
- Béla Szőkefalvi-Nagy, mathematician
- Philip Wodianer, communal worker
- Adele Zay (1848–1928), teacher and feminist

== International relations ==
=== Twin towns ===
Szeged is twinned with:

- Cambridge, United Kingdom (1987)
- Darmstadt, Germany (1990)
- Kotor, Montenegro (2001)
- Larnaca, Cyprus (1994)
- Liège, Belgium (2001)
- Łódź, Poland (2004)
- Nice, France (1969)
- Odesa, Ukraine (1957)
- Parma, Italy (1988)
- Pula, Croatia (2003)
- Rakhiv, Ukraine (1939, renewed 1997)
- Subotica, Serbia (1966, renewed 2004)
- Târgu Mureș, Romania (1997)
- Timișoara, Romania (1998)
- Toledo, Ohio, United States (1990)
- Turku, Finland (1971)
- Weinan, China (1999)

=== Partner cities ===
- Novi Sad, Serbia (2001)

== Gallery ==
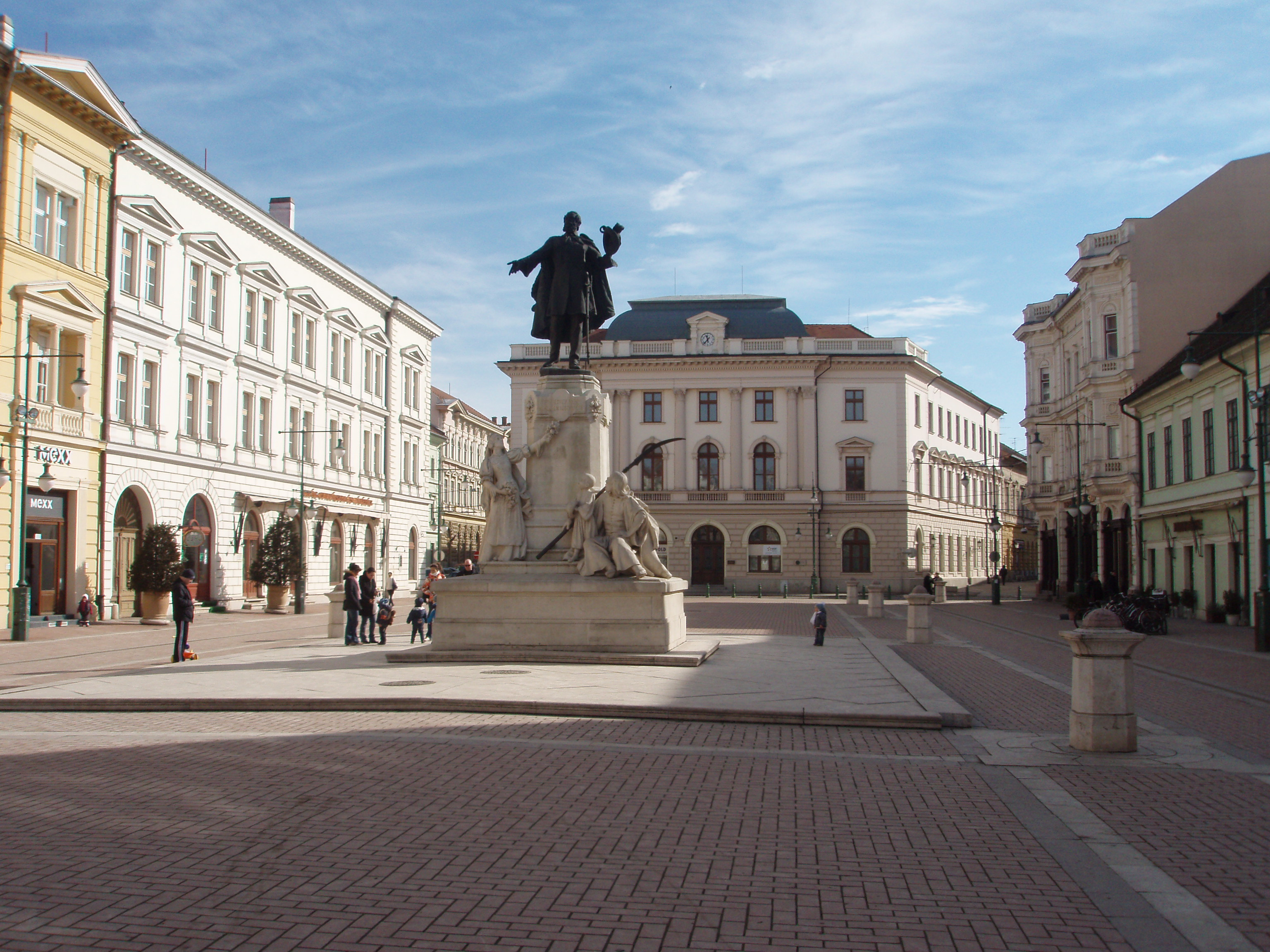
Klauzál Square

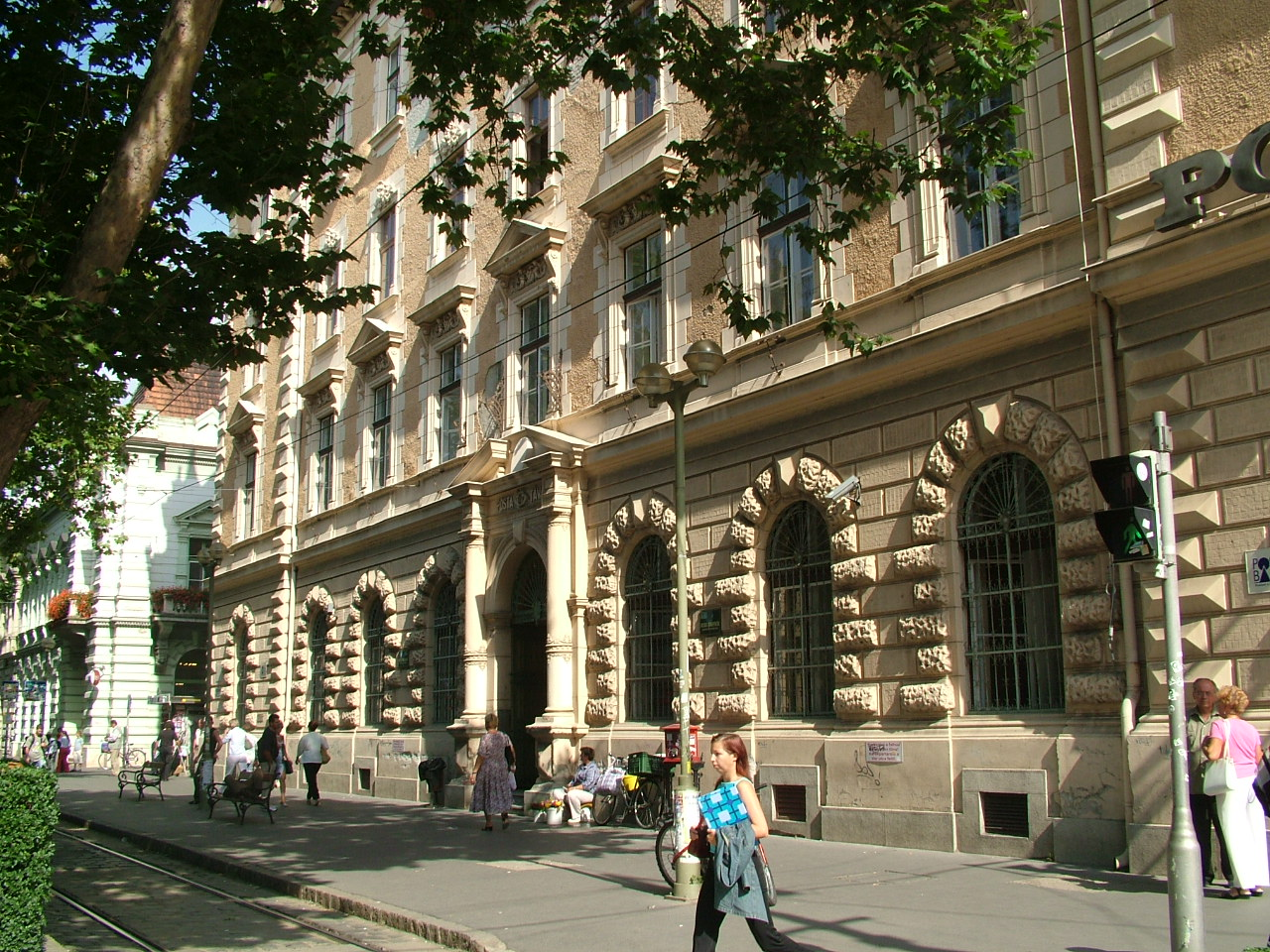
Postal Palace

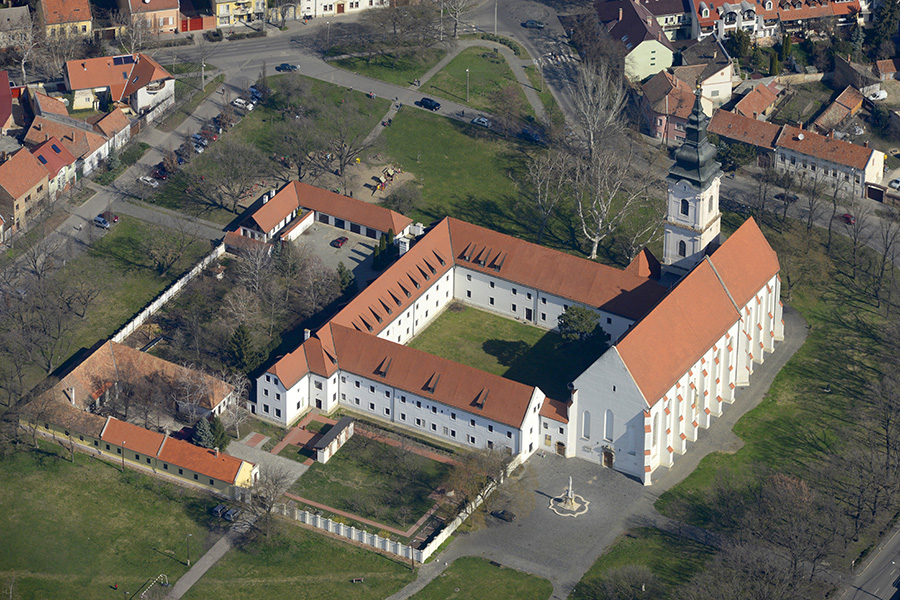
Franciscan monastery and church

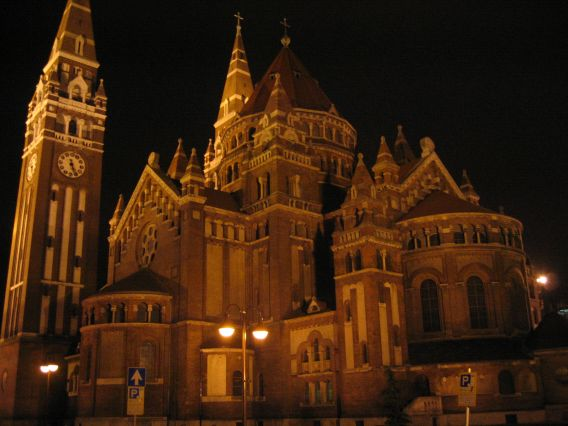
Votive Church at night

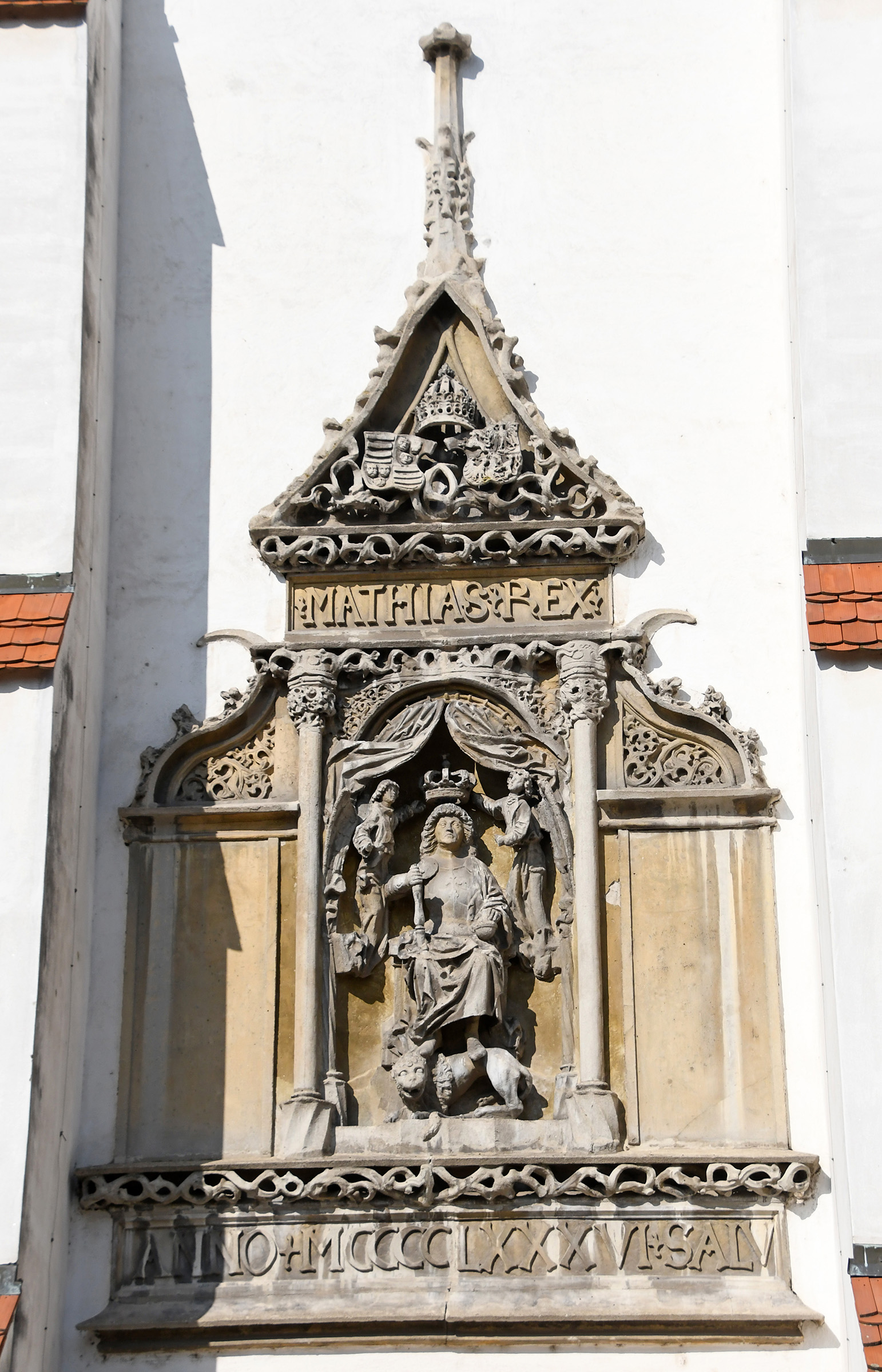
Relief of King Matthias Corvinus of Hungary

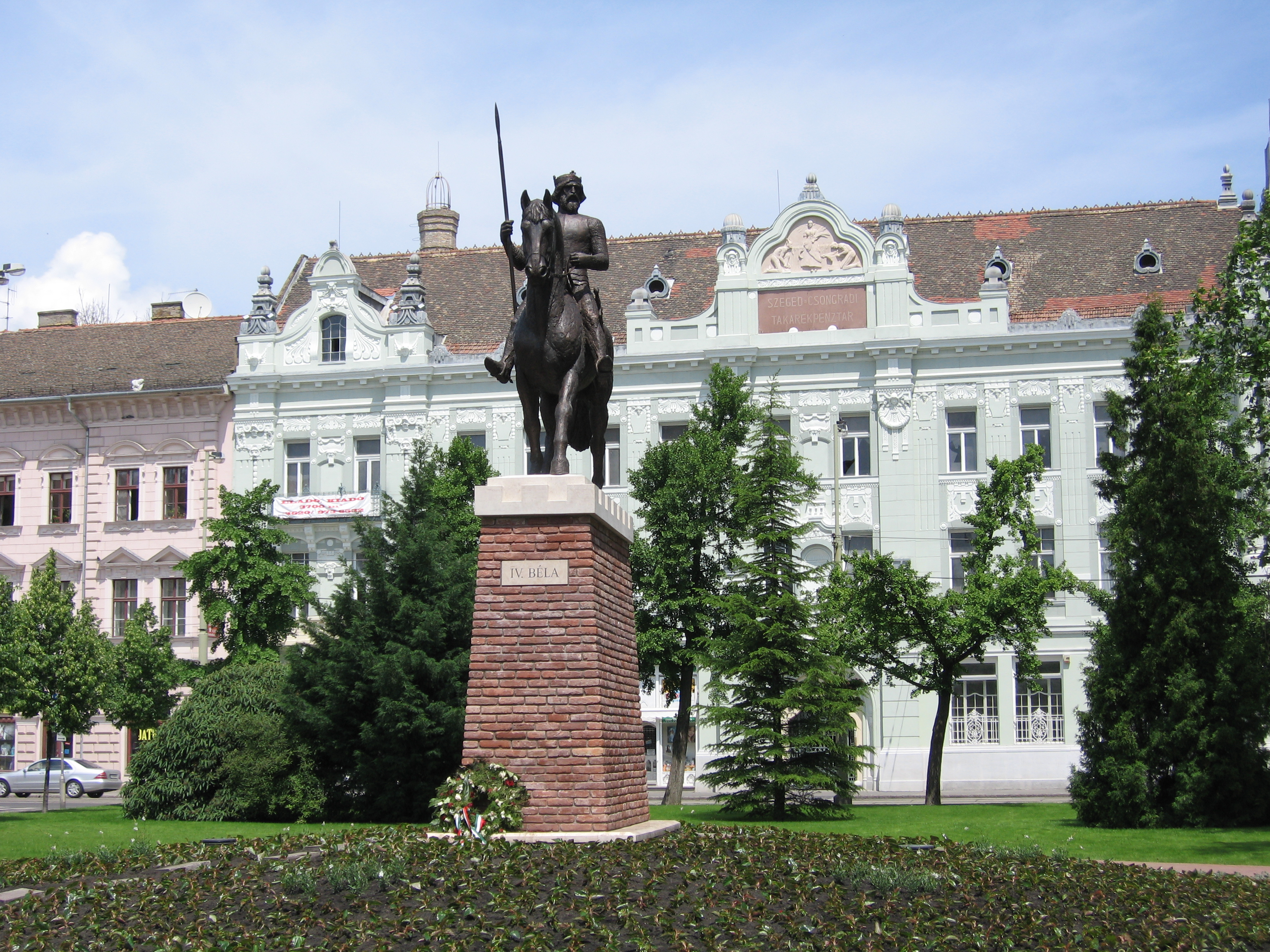
Statue of King Béla IV of Hungary

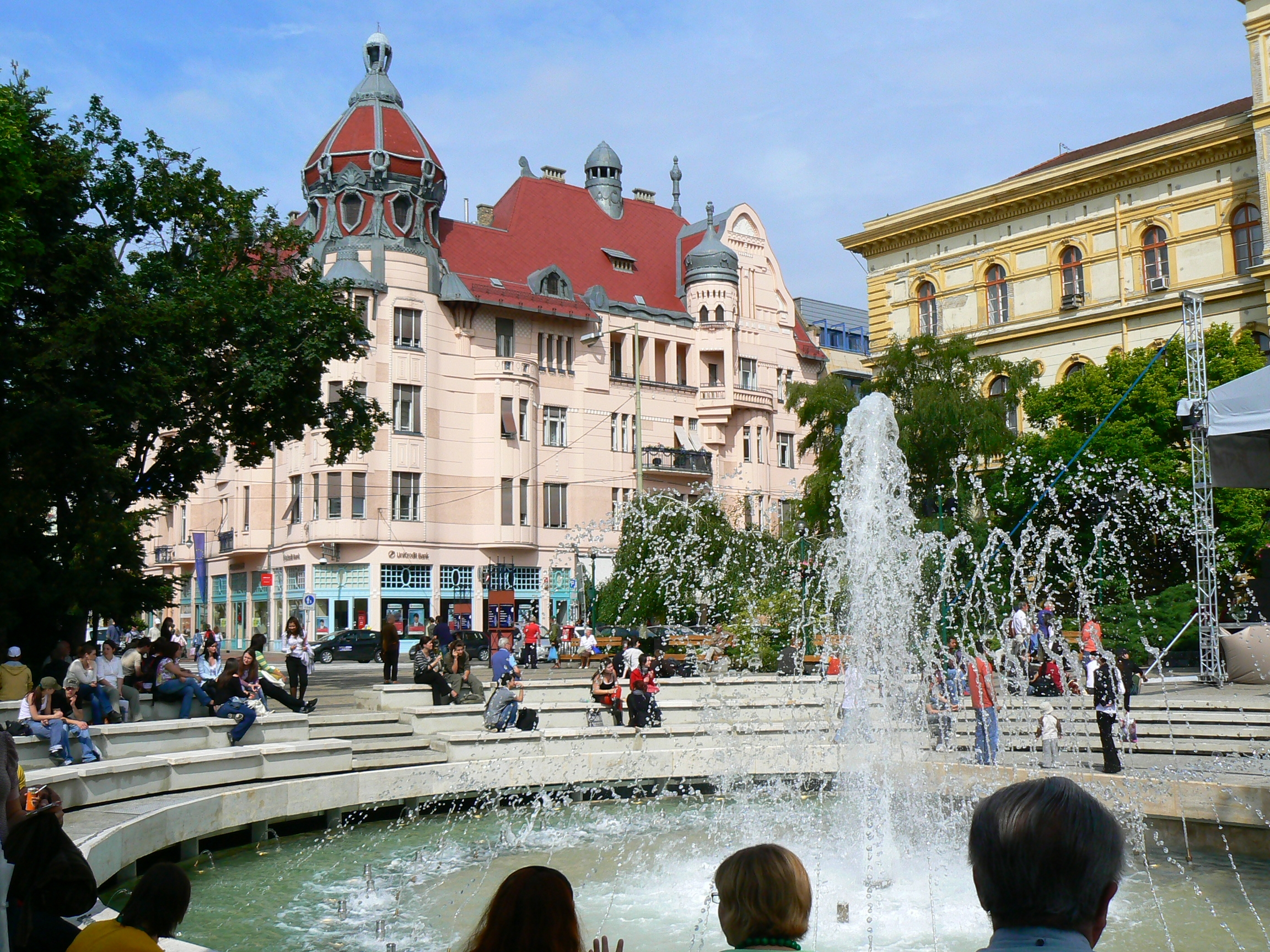
Unger–Mayer House (1911)

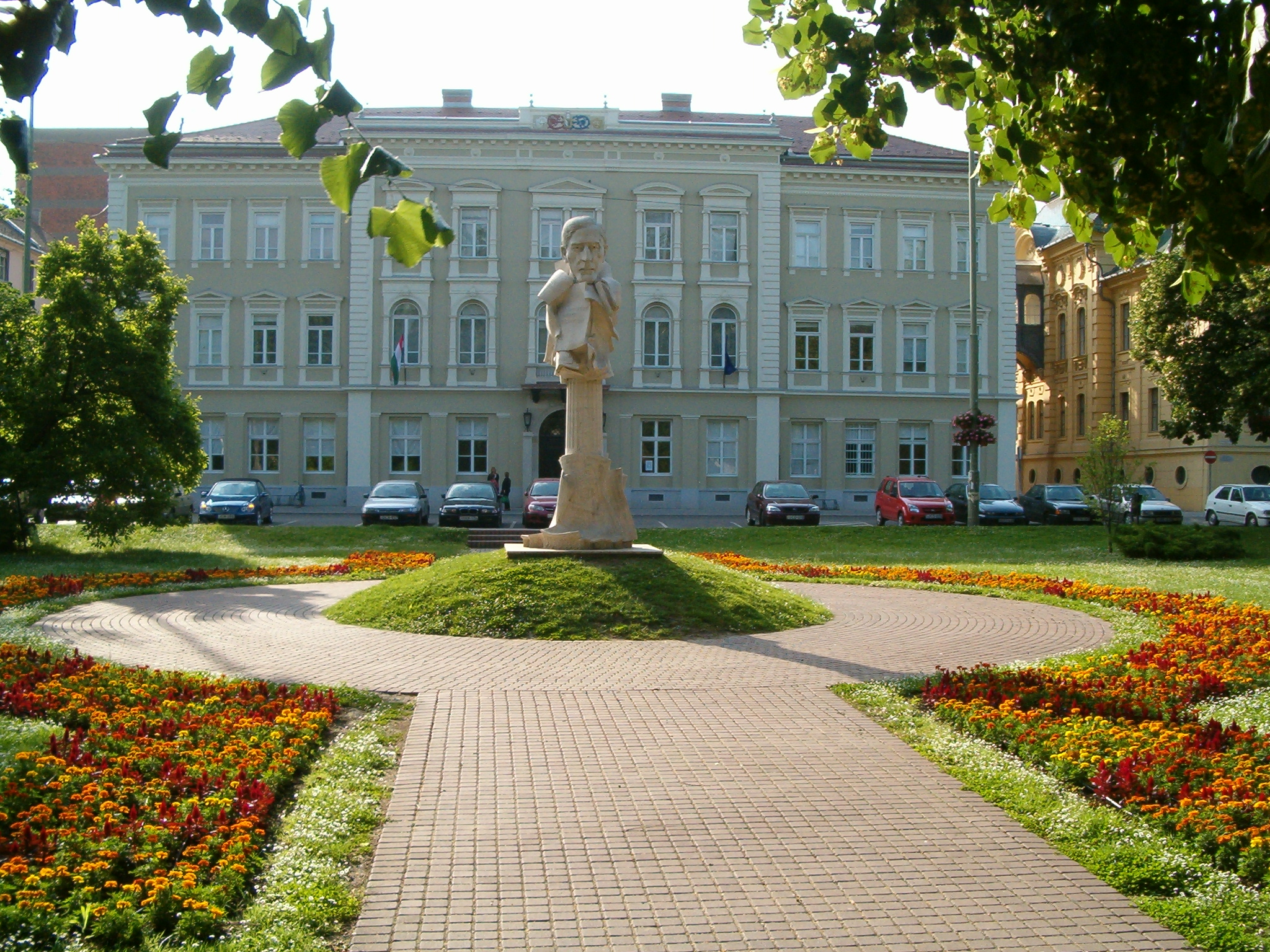
Statue of Kuno von Klebelsberg

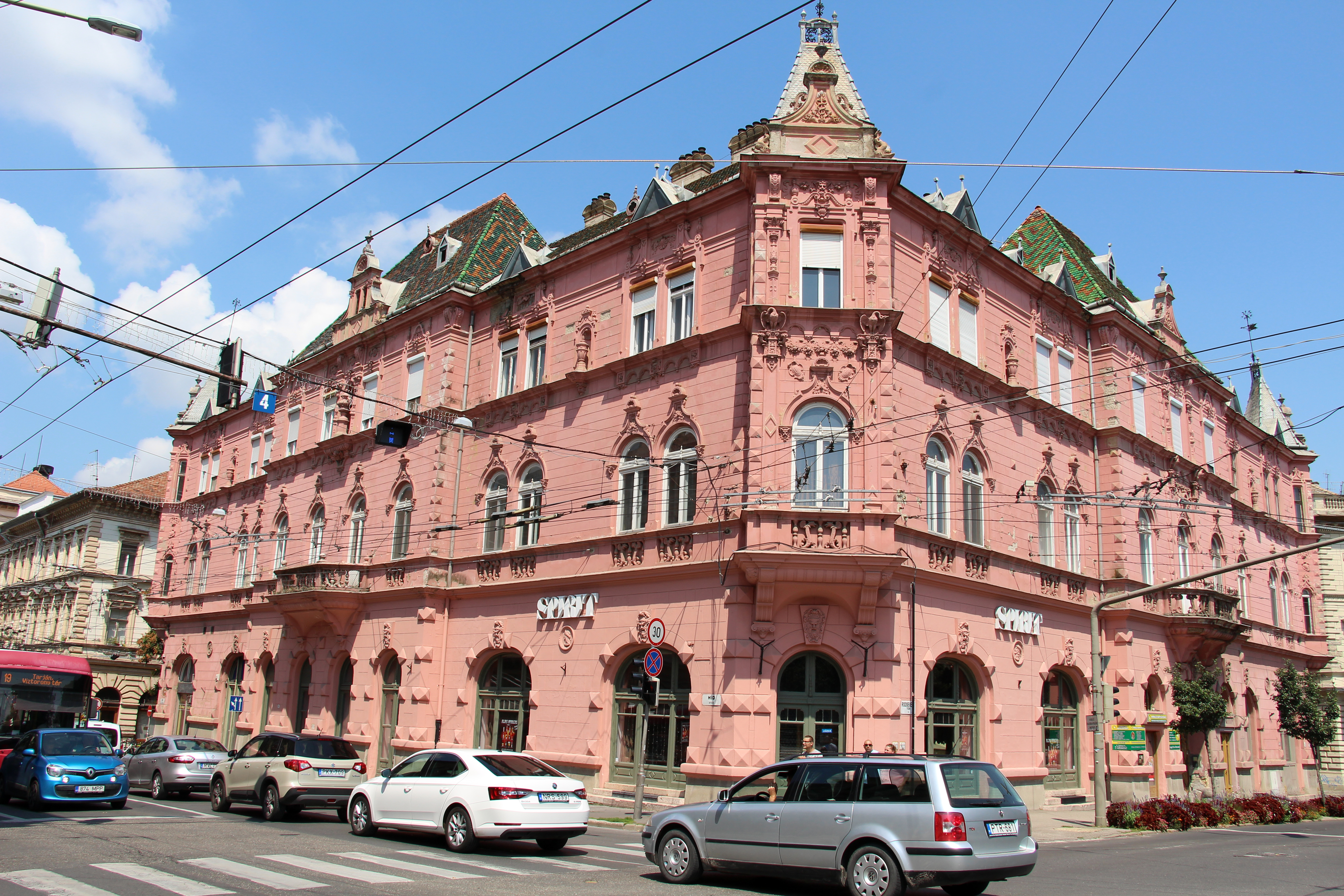
Art Nouveau architecture

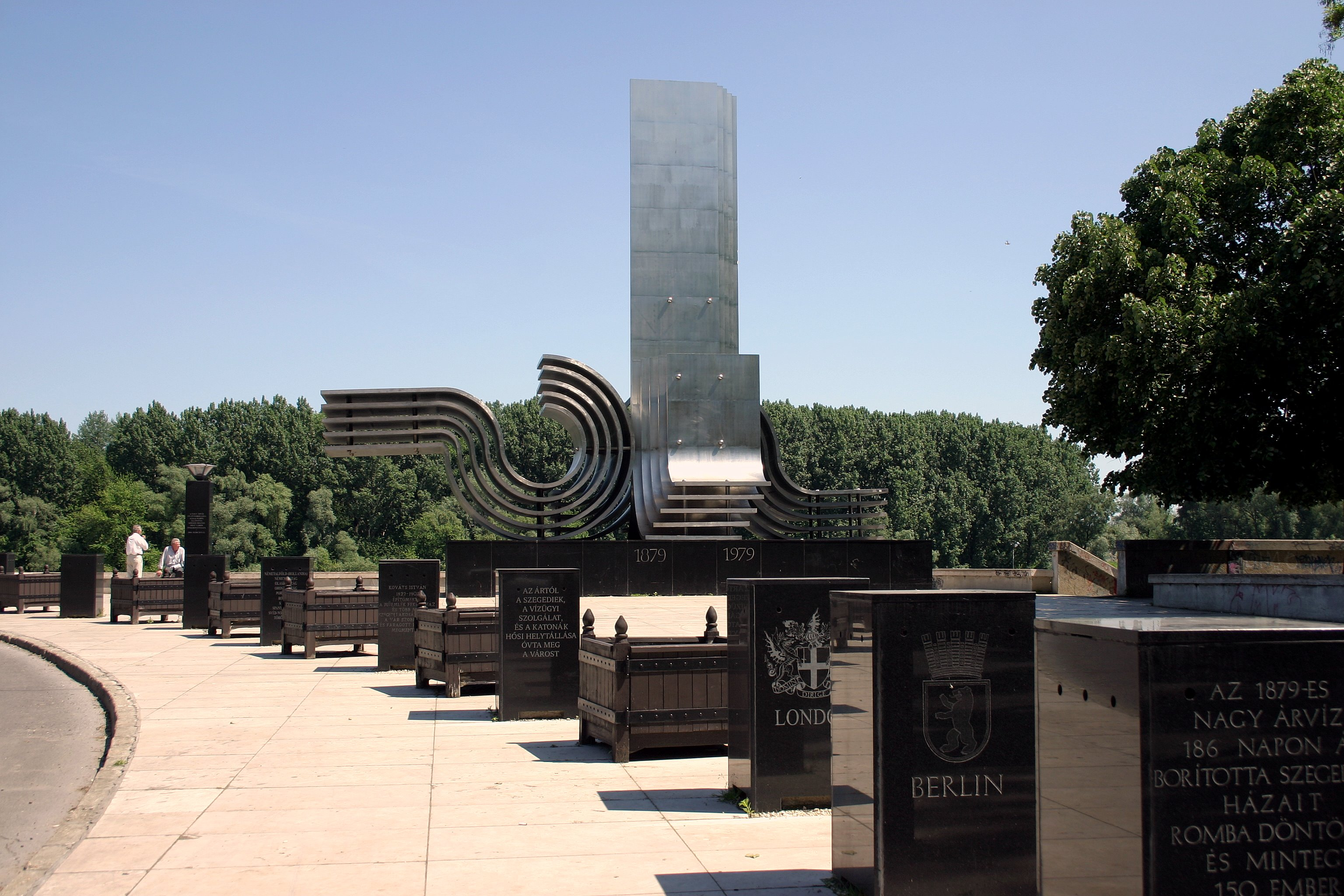
The Great Flood (1879) Statue

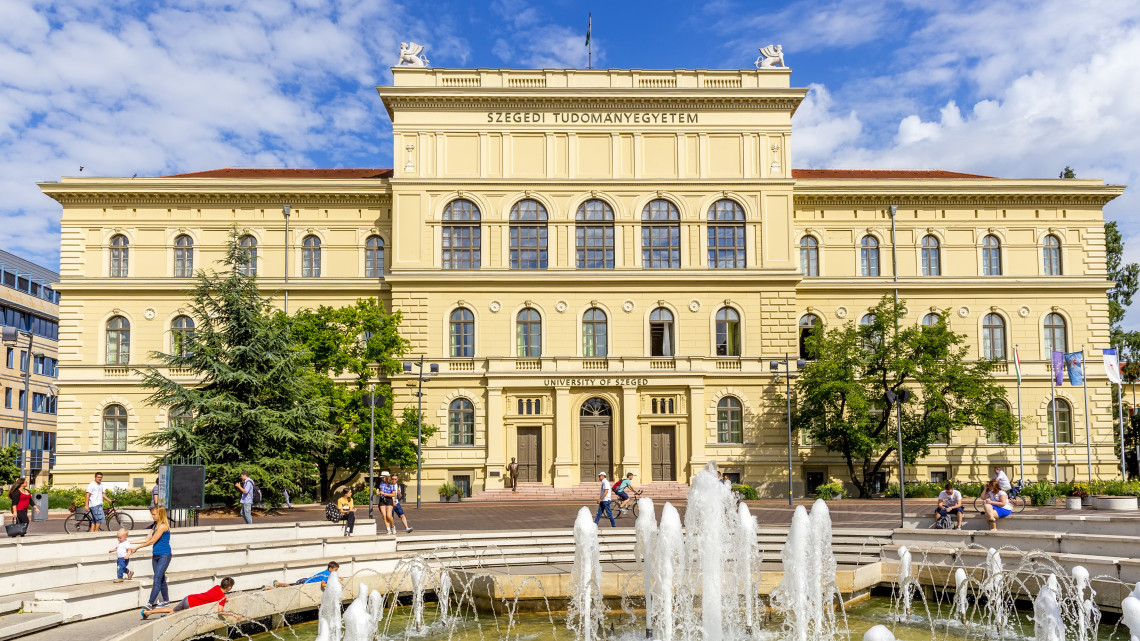
Rector's Building, University of Szeged

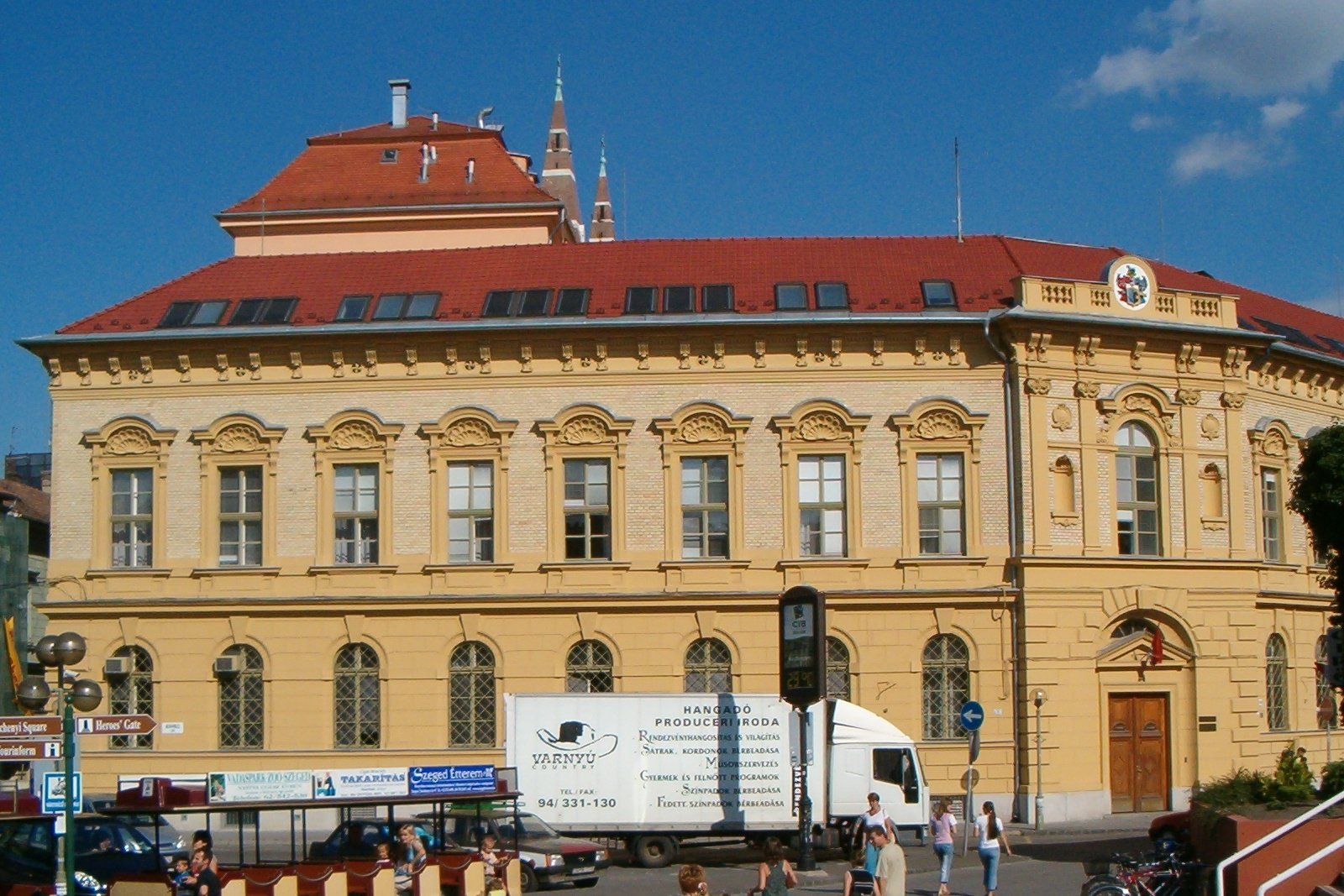
Institute of Informatics & IT Department, University of Szeged

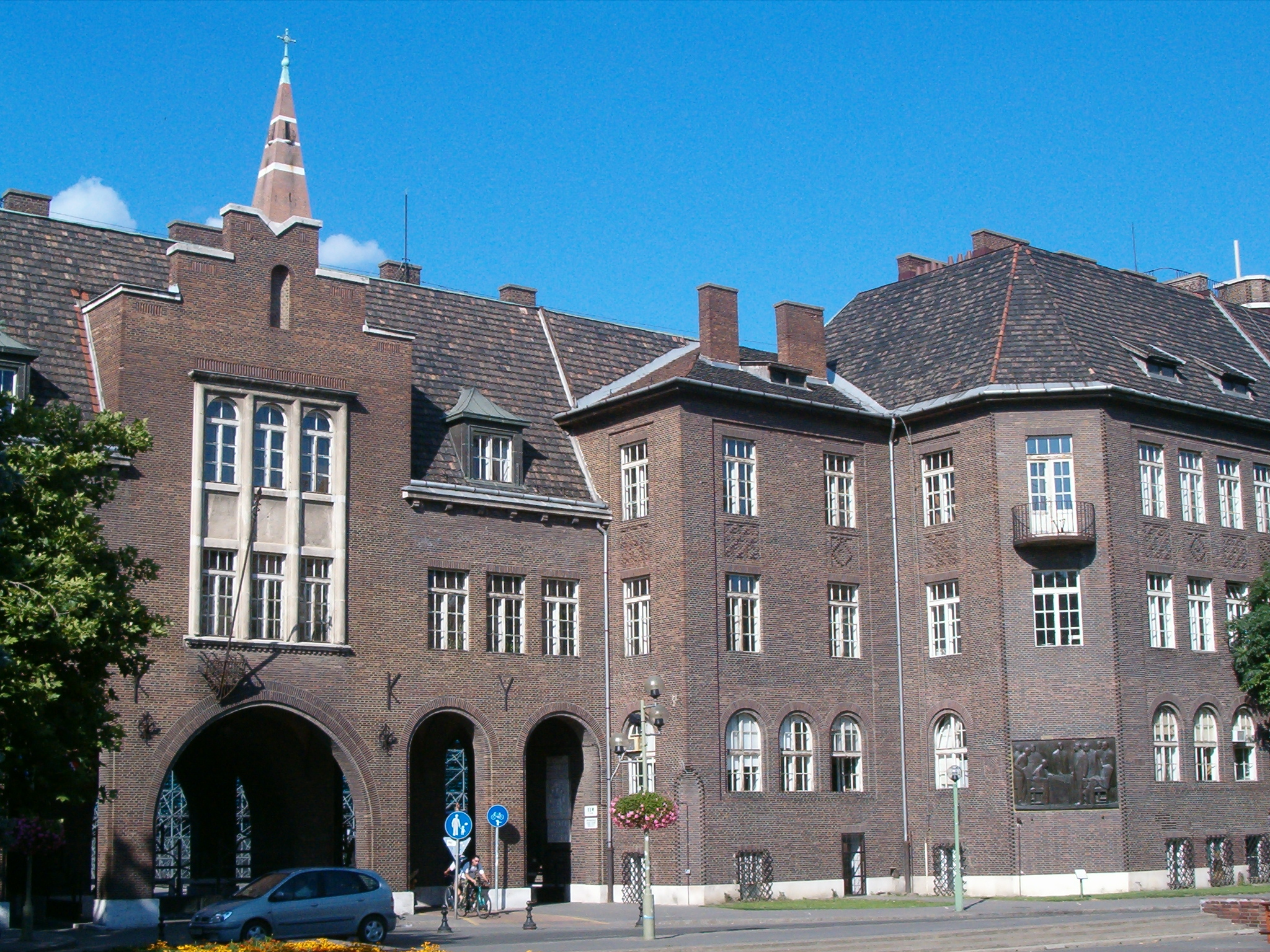
Faculty of Sciences (the chemistry building), University of Szeged

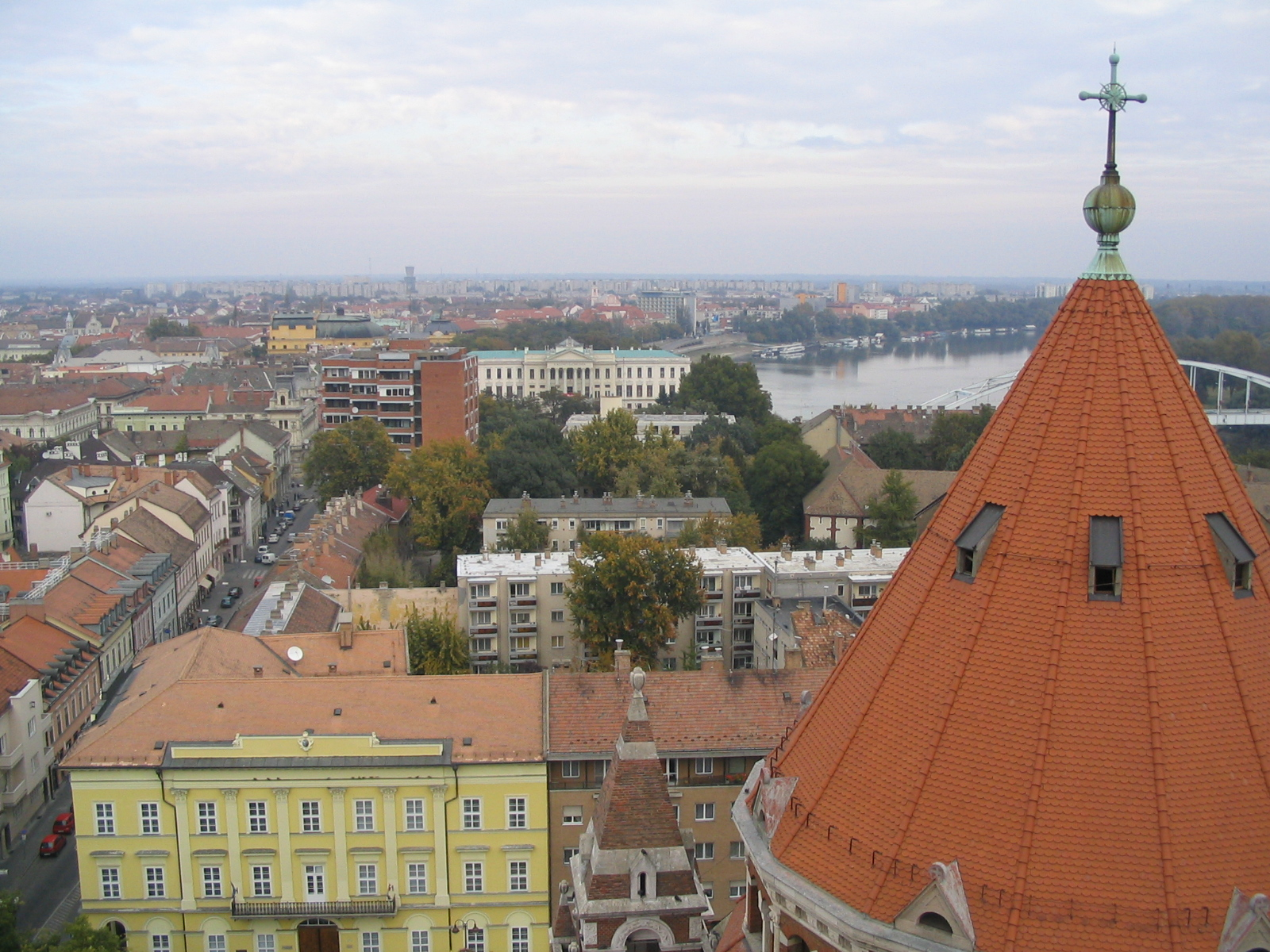
View from the Votive Church Dome

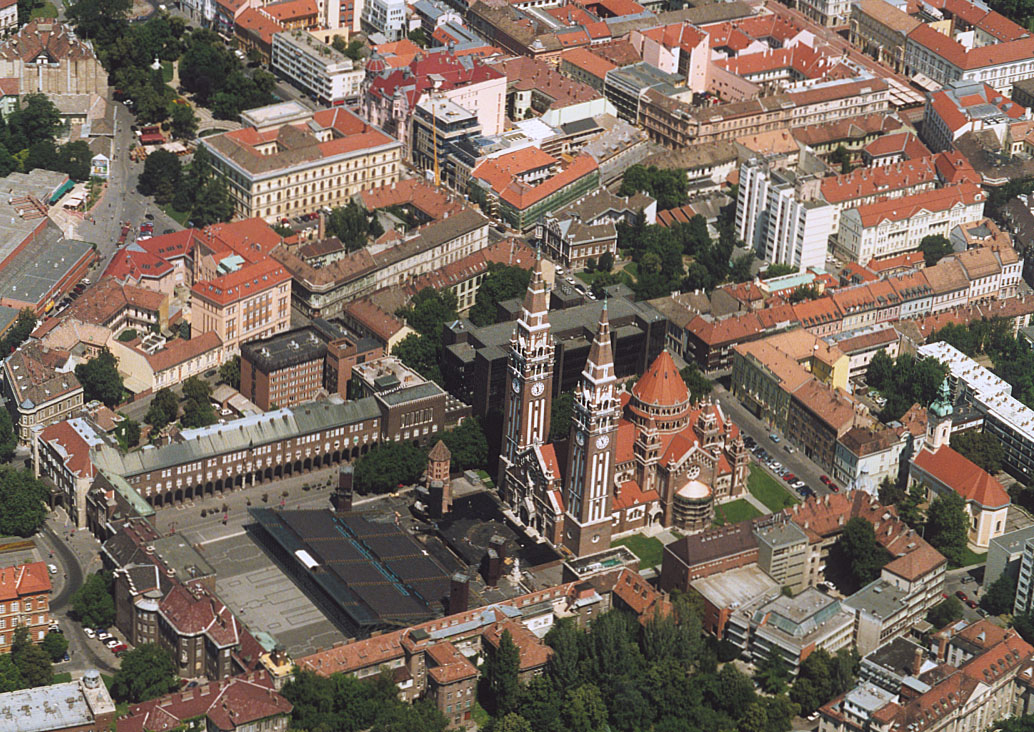
Aerial photography

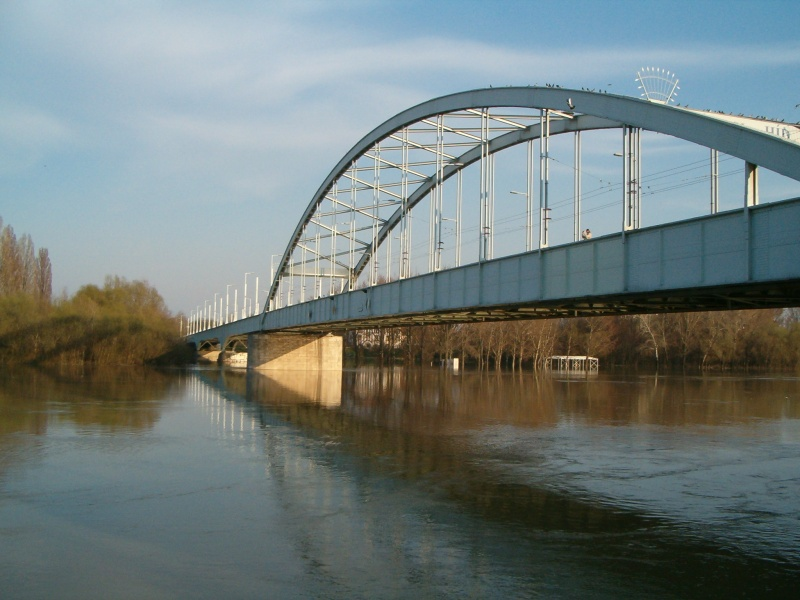
Belvárosi bridge on the Tisza river

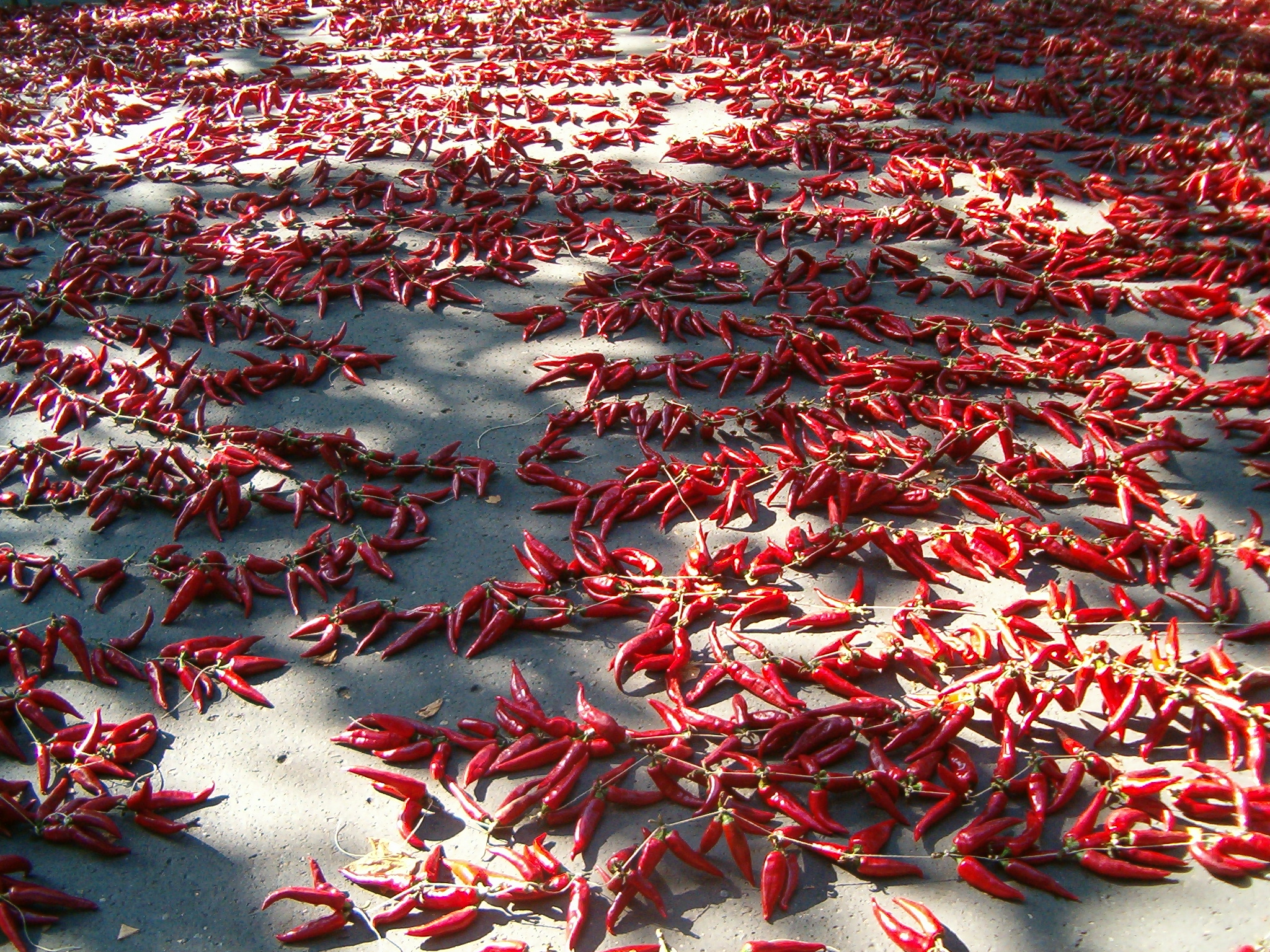
Capsicum fruits in Szeged

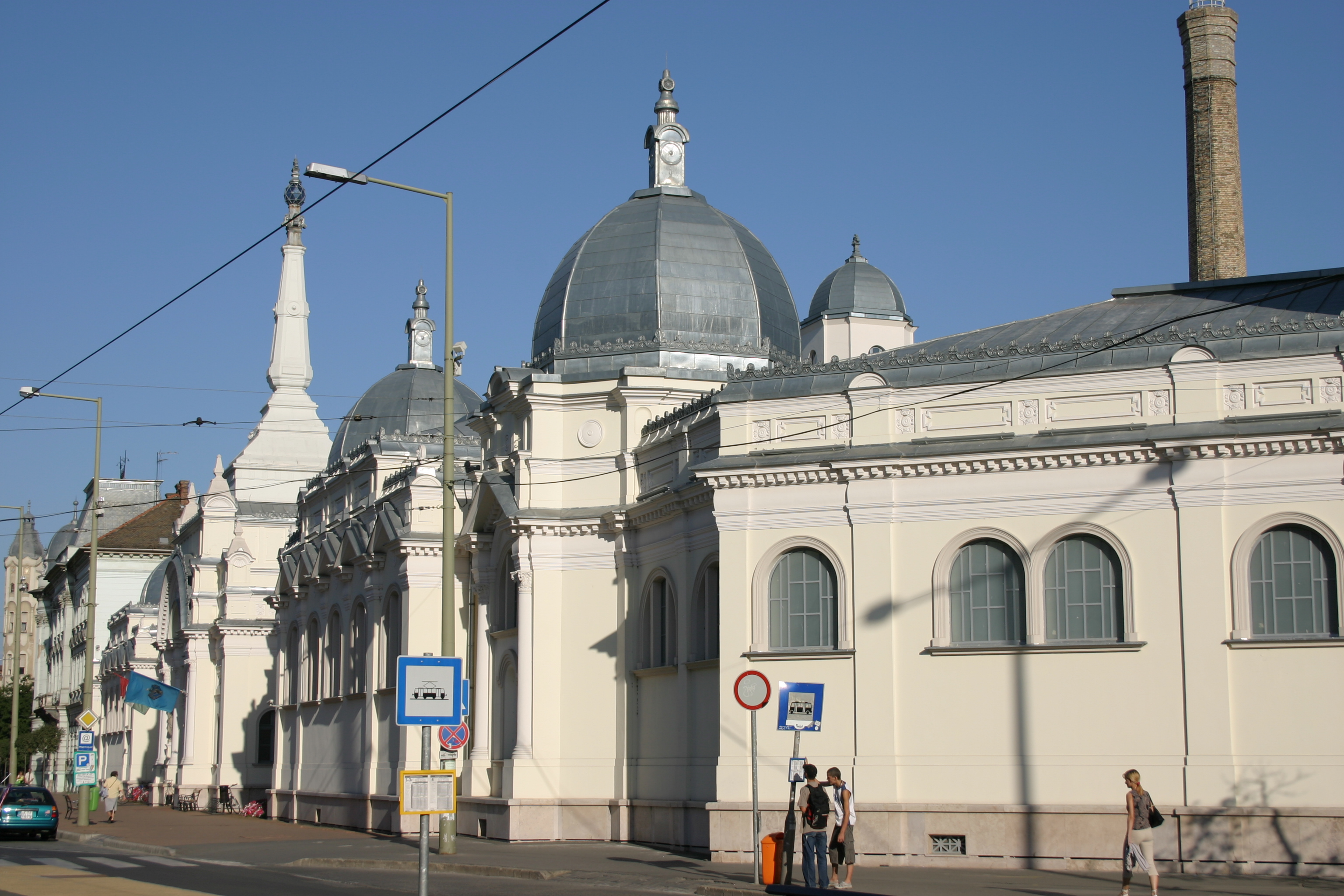
Anna Thermal-Bath

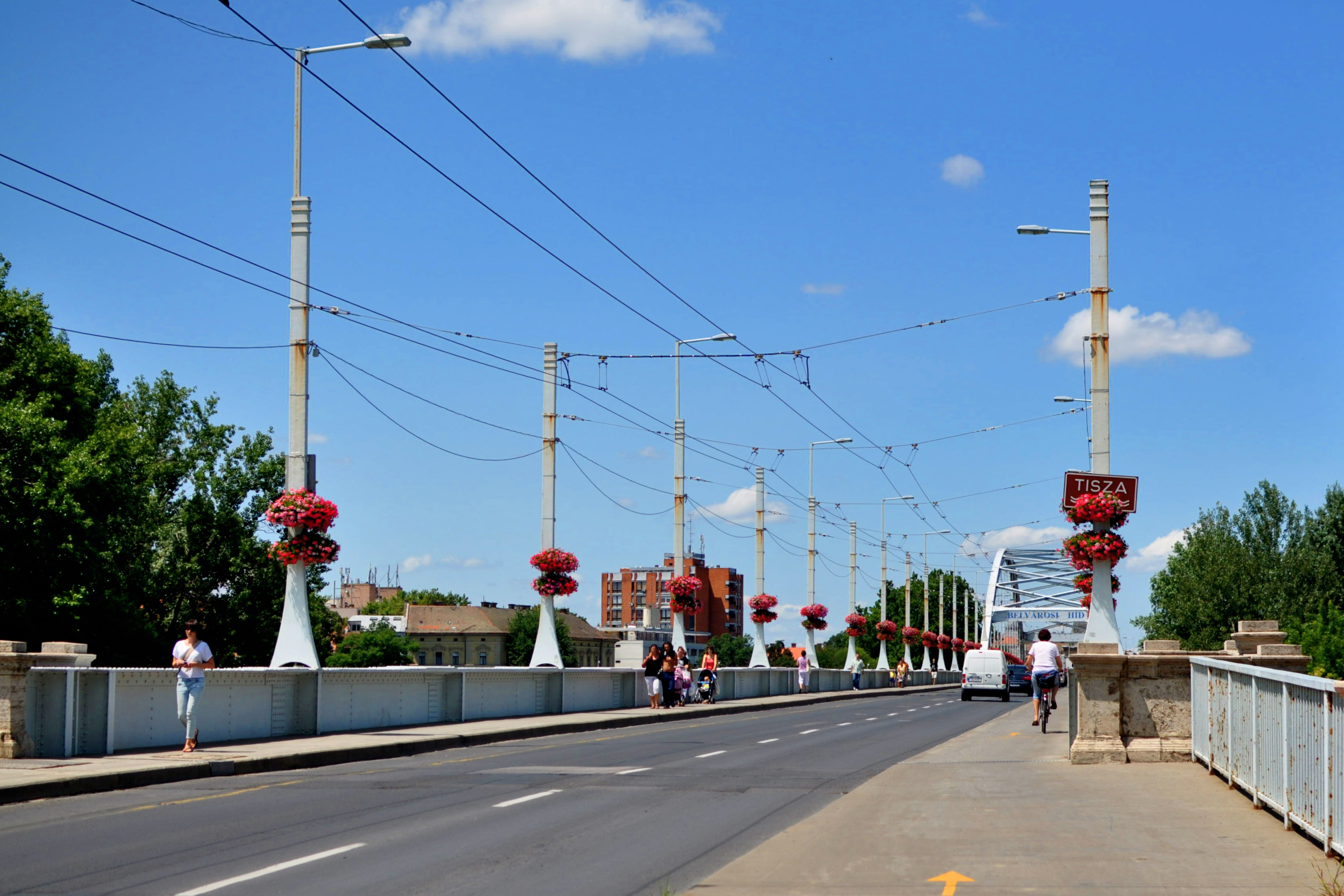
Szeged bridge on Tisza

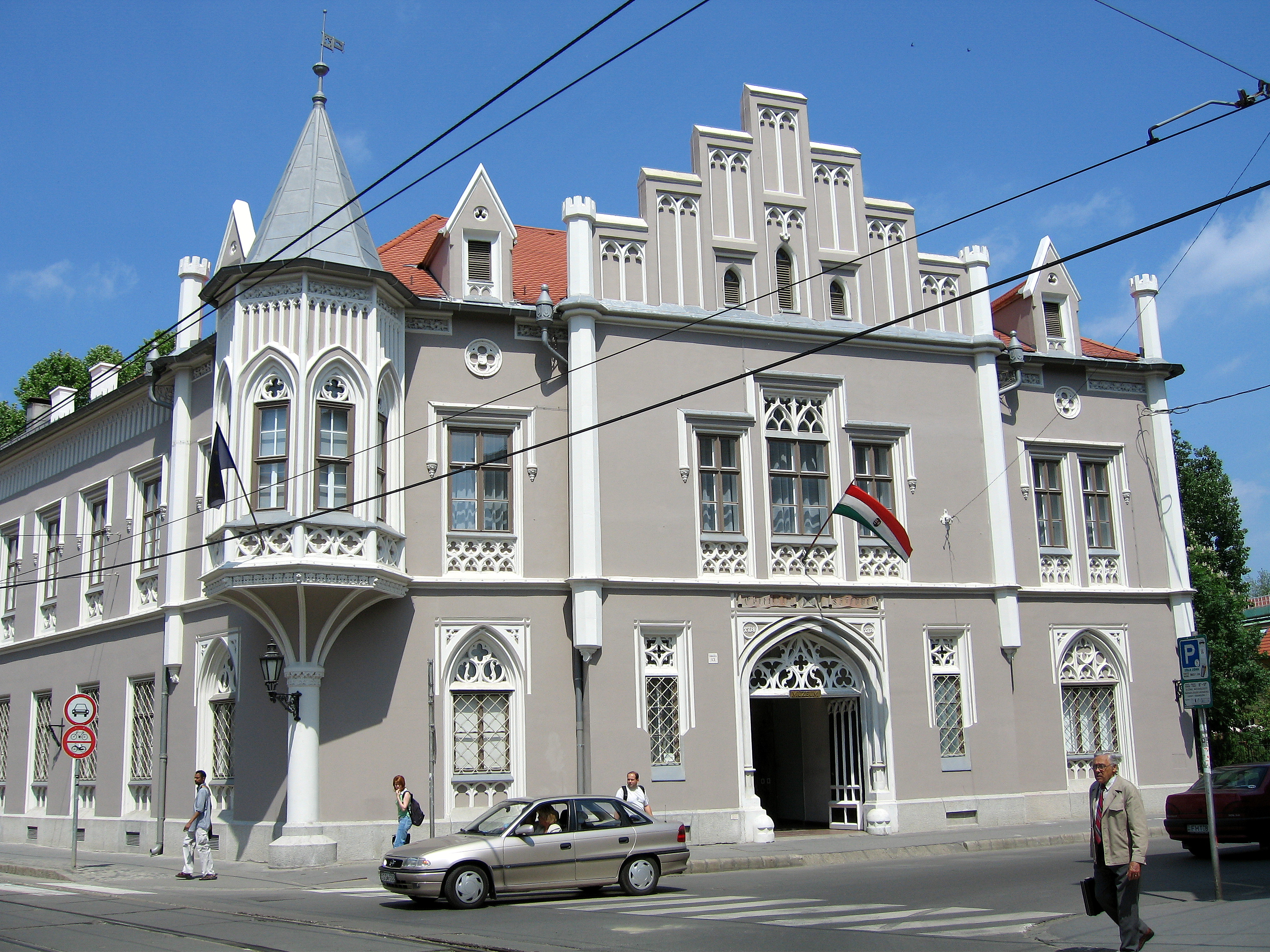
Fekete-house

== See also ==
- Public transport in Szeged
- Szeged Symphony Orchestra
- National Theatre of Szeged
