= Body shaming =

Discrimination based on appearance

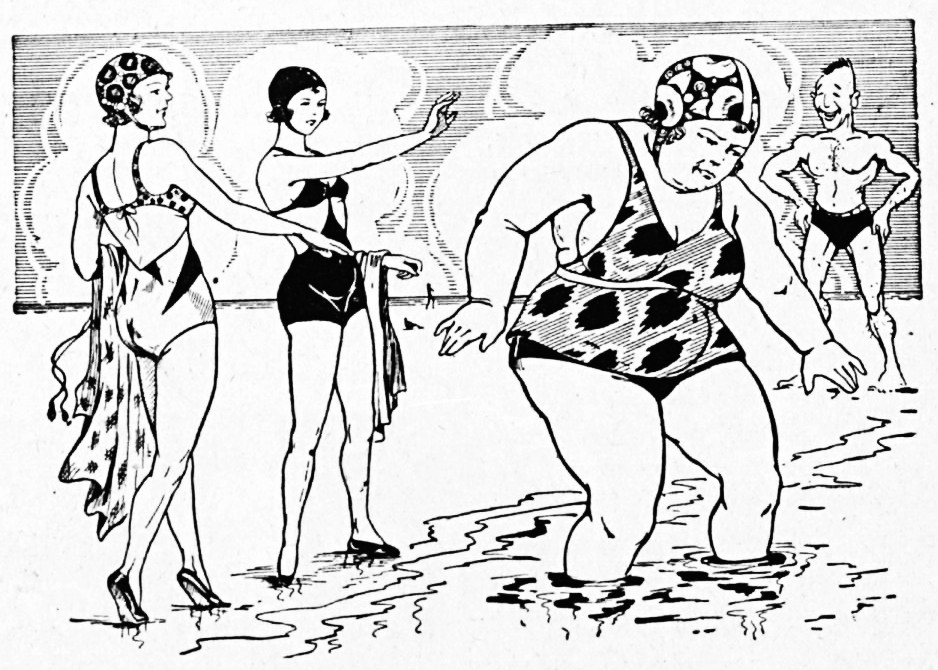
Bullying of an overweight woman depicted in a 1942 advertisement for a dietary supplement

Body shaming is the action or inaction of subjecting someone to humiliation and criticism for their bodily features. There are various types of body shaming, including but not limited to fat-shaming, shaming for thinness, height-shaming, shaming of hairiness (or lack thereof), of hair color, body shape, one's muscularity (or lack thereof), shaming of penis size or breast size, shaming of looks (facial features), shaming of skin color, shaming of lip size/shape, and in its broadest sense may even include shaming of tattoos and piercings, or diseases that leave a physical mark such as psoriasis.

Body shaming may take the form of bullying because of a person's physical disabilities or deformity.

In a study of children's film and books regarding messages about the importance of appearance, media targeted toward children were heavily saturated with messages emphasizing attractiveness as an important part of relationships and interpersonal interaction. Among the movies used in the study, two Disney movies contained the highest number of messages about personal beauty. This study also found 64% of the videos studied portrayed obese characters as unattractive, evil, cruel, and unfriendly, and more than half of the portrayals involved the consideration or consumption of food.

Some forms of body shaming have ancient origins in popular superstition, such as discrimination against people with red hair and stereotypes of people with blonde hair. Forms of discrimination may also differ significantly depending on age group. For example, tall preadolescents are sometimes depicted as awkward and can face derogatory pejorative terms such as "lanky", despite height being a typically valued characteristic among adults.

Sometimes body shaming can extend to a perception that one does not sufficiently display masculinity or femininity. For example, men with wide hips, prominent breasts, or lack of facial hair or height are sometimes shamed for appearing feminine. Similarly, women can be body shamed for appearing to have a man-bulge, or for having broad shoulders, physical traits that are typically associated with men. Extensive levels of body shaming can have negative emotional effects, including lowered self-esteem and the development of issues such as eating disorders, anxiety, body image disturbance, body dysmorphic disorder and depression. These depressive effects can worsen especially when people feel their body can not meet social criteria.
