= How to be a Redhead =

Website by Adrienne and Stephanie Vendetti

- Website type: Beauty site for redheads
- Available in: English
- Owners: Co-founders: Adrienne Vendetti; Stephanie Vendetti
- Website: howtobearedhead.com
- Commercial: yes
- Registration: Optional
- Launched: 11 January 2011; 15 years ago
- Current status: Active

How to be a Redhead is a website founded by redheaded American sisters Adrienne and Stephanie Vendetti in response to the ostracism they encountered in school and to serve the needs of other redheaded women.

== Background ==
Adrienne and Stephanie Vendetti were born natural redheads and grew up in Cranston, Rhode Island. As children they attended Holy Ghost School in Providence, as teenagers attended La Salle Academy, and eventually both earned business degrees from the University of Miami.

The sisters recall how they were the only redheaded students at their grade school and how starting in second or third grade, were subjected to bullying by other students. The unwanted attention was so great that Stephanie chose to dye her hair blonde in high school. As they grew up they had difficulty finding beauty products that met their needs. In mid-2010, and based upon an idea they had during high school, they planned the creation of a website intended as "a positive, supportive environment for redheads that also provided beauty and fashion advice."

"We wanted to create a place where redheads could go and feel beautiful... something we didn't have when we were teenagers. It can be tough being a redhead. It's almost like you're a minority because you look so different." – Stephanie Vendetti

The site launched on January 11, 2011, and became a full-time career for both. They had wished to work in the background, but they realized that more involvement was necessary on their parts because they knew "how to be redheads". Approximately eight months after launch, they became brand spokespersons for L'Oréal Paris, their first major sponsor and, as sponsor, L'Oréal brought their likenesses forward as brand representatives.

Understanding the difficulties in reaching a niche market, they turned to social media, and by September 2014, had 12,000 followers on Facebook, 9,000 followers on Twitter, 88,000 followers on Instagram, and 6,000 followers on Pinterest, with a YouTube channel in development. Rather than have advertising on their website, revenue is generated through sales of redhead-themed branded products, vendor-sponsored give-a-ways, and "Rock It Like A Redhead" events. With Adrienne focusing on business development, and Stephanie on social media, the website now "has 75,000 unique visitors and more than 200,000 unique page views per month."

Their first "Rock it Like a Redhead" event, a beauty and fashion event targeted at redheads only, was held in New York City on March 16, 2013.

== Reception ==
The website was invited to be part of the Glam.com/Bliss.com network, and was awarded in 2011 as "Best Beauty Blog" by Shape Magazine. It was reported by Lancashire Evening Post in July 2011 as being ranked as among "top 50 Beauty Blogs" in the United Kingdom by its being listed by EverydaySale.co.uk at number seven among professional beauty blogs.

== See also ==
- Discrimination against people with red hair
