= Redhead Day =

Annual Dutch summer festival

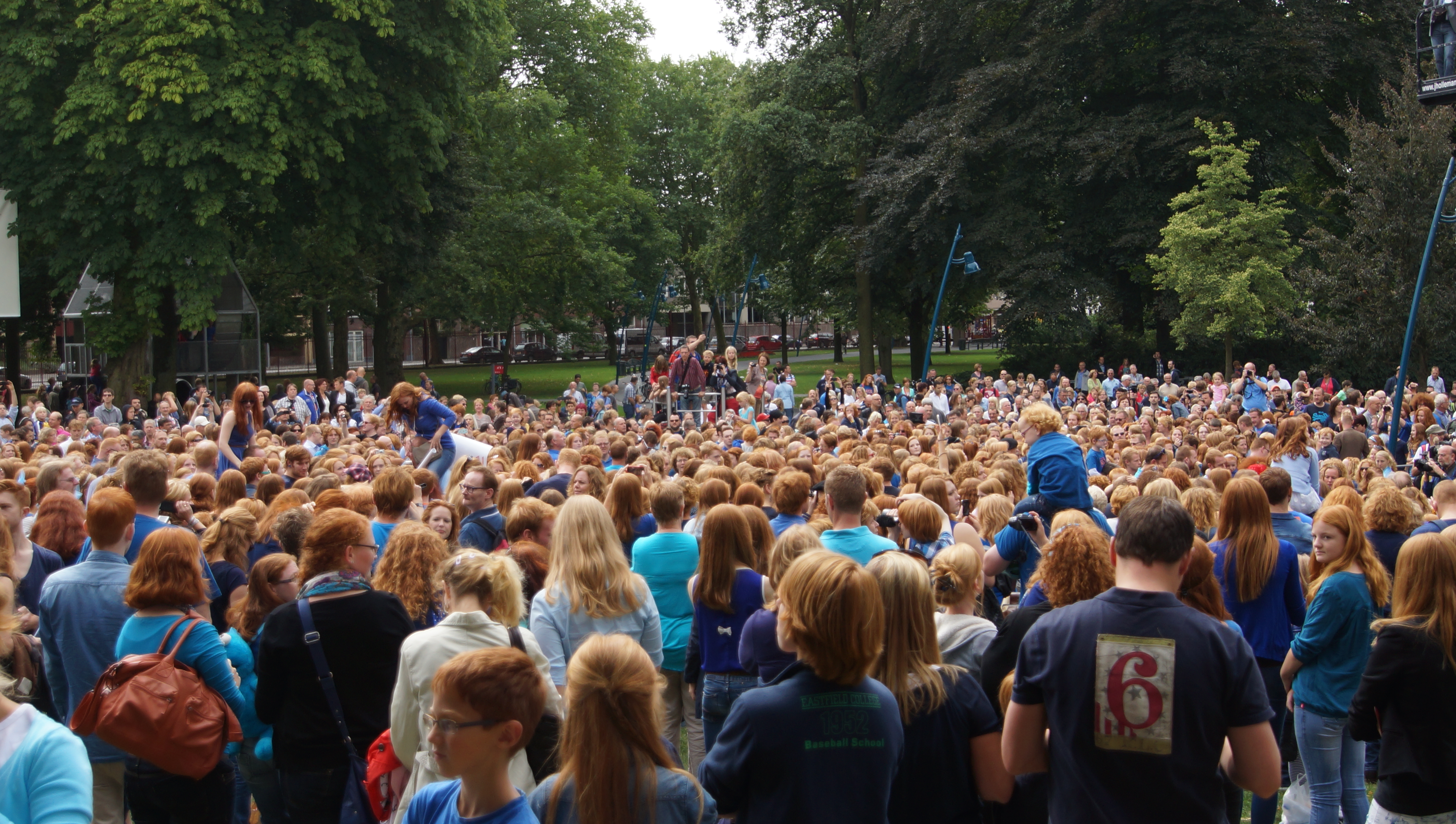
Redhead Day 2013

Redhead Day (Roodharigendag in Dutch) is the name of a Dutch summer festival that takes place each last weekend of August in the city of Tilburg. The festival started in 2005 in the small city Asten, and was held from 2007 up to 2018 in the city of Breda, in the Netherlands. The three-day festival is a gathering of tens of thousands of people in the city center of Tilburg, including many thousands of people with natural red hair, from more than 80 countries.

== Philosophy of the festival ==
The festival is based on three core values: connection, pride, and recognition. Each activity at the festival includes one or more of these values.

== Origins ==
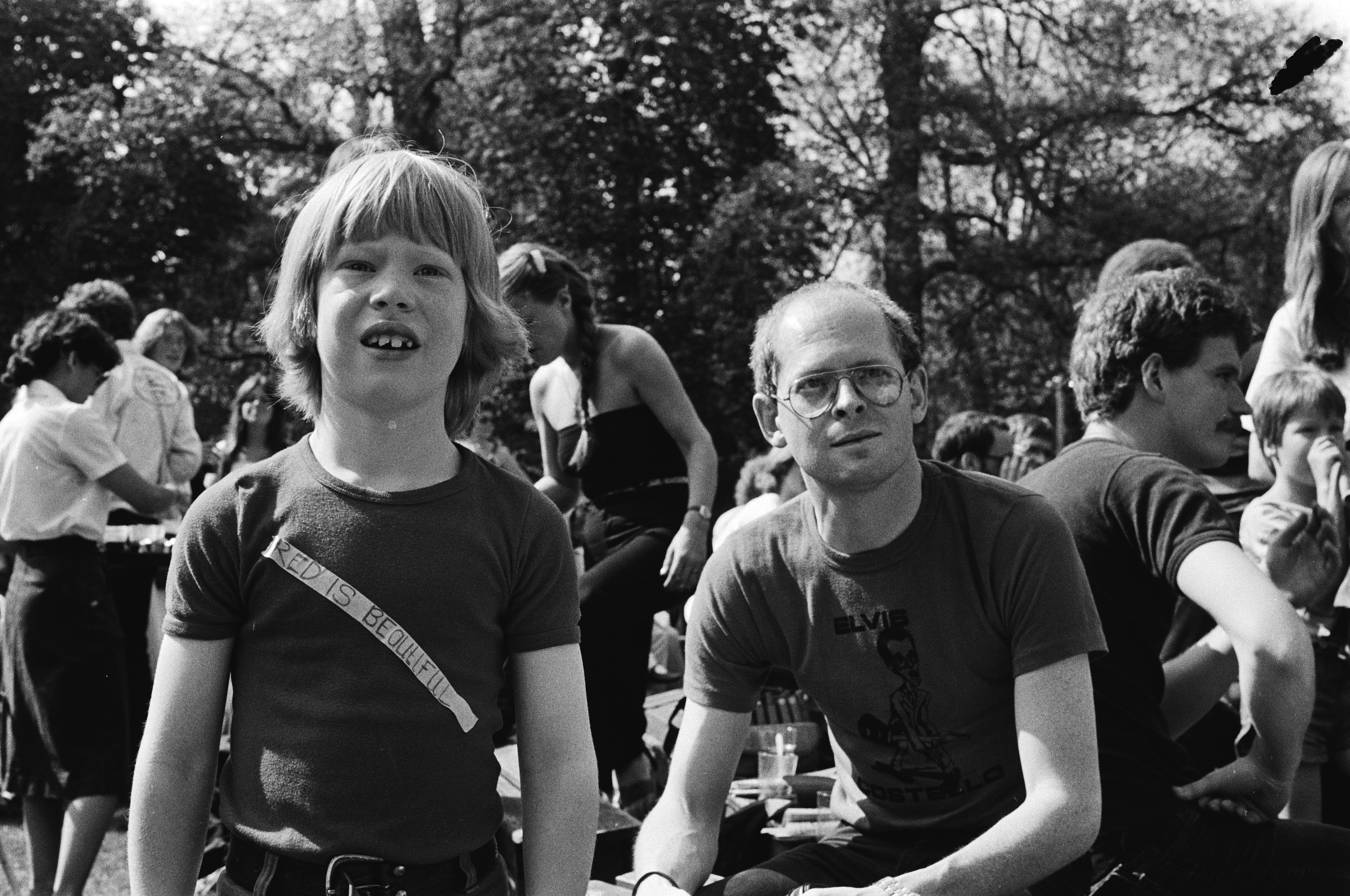
A redheaded child and his father at the VPRO gathering in 1979

In 1979, Dutch public broadcaster VPRO organized a 'redhead day' in Baarn, Utrecht. Hosted by Djoeke Veeninga, it was attended by hundreds of redheads.

== 2000s ==
=== 2005 ===
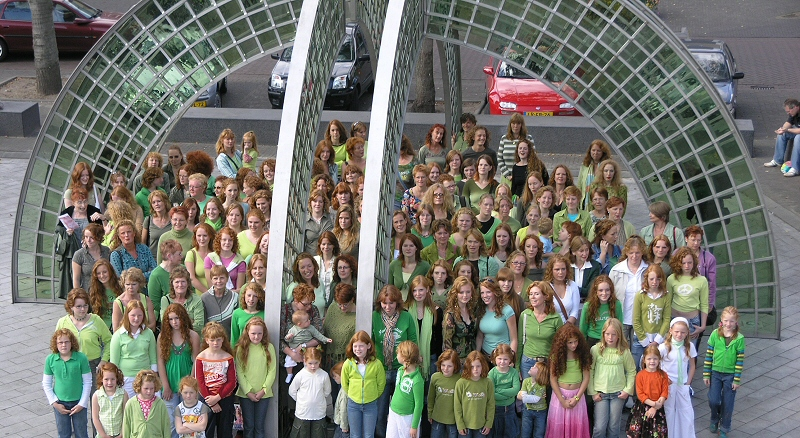
Many redheads together in mostly green clothing at the first Redheadday in 2005

The festival was started in 2005 unintentionally by the Dutch painter Bart Rouwenhorst in the small Dutch city of Asten. As a painter, he was inspired by artists like Dante Gabriel Rossetti and Gustav Klimt. Both of these artists created dramatic portraits of women, and both artists made famous paintings depicting redheaded women.

To follow in the footsteps of his favourite painters, Rouwenhorst planned an exhibition of fifteen new paintings of redheads. Finding models was problematic, since redheads are rare in the Netherlands where only two percent of the population has natural red hair. To find models, an advertisement was placed in a local newspaper. However, instead of 15, 150 models volunteered.

Not wanting to turn down so many potential models, Rouwenhorst decided to choose 14 models, organise a group photo shoot for remaining redheads, and have a lottery to decide by chance who would be the 15th and final model. Thus began the first Redheadday.

That year, the focus was on red-haired women only, since they were asked to volunteer to pose for the paintings. At the events in later years, the aim was to attract redheaded men as well as women, but still the sexes are not equally distributed. The first meeting attracted 150 natural redheads.

=== 2007 ===
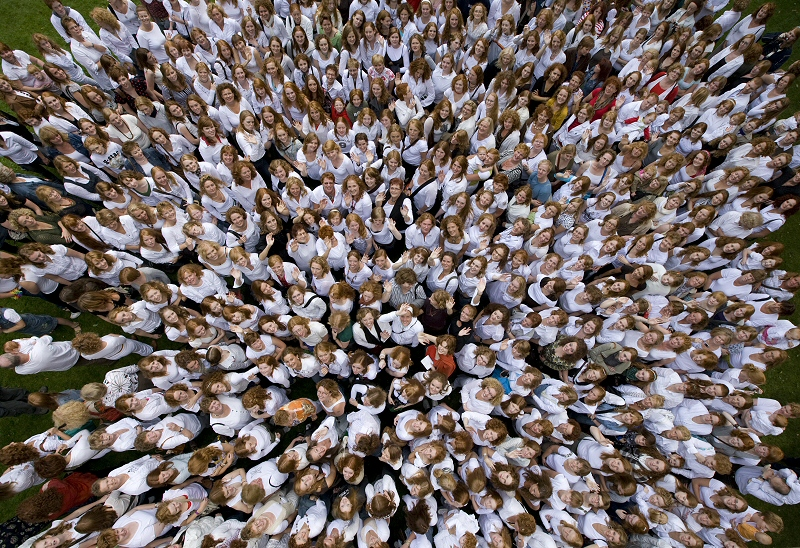
Hundreds of redheads together in 2007

The second event was organised in 2007, in and around the main church of Breda. On 2 September 2007, 800 redheads including Evelien went to the city. The dress code was white. The festival was opened by the mayor of Breda, unveiling a painting of fifty redheads. The festival poster contained a picture of a redheaded model (Milanne) in a wedding dress. Redheaded children were allowed off school for a week because of this event. This holiday still continues for some schools in The Netherlands.

=== 2008 ===
On 7 September 2008, about 1,500 to 2,000 redheads from 15 countries went to Breda to celebrate the third Redhead day. The programme consisted of 42 activities, including exhibitions of forty artists. The dress code was black. The programme was multi-lingual for the first time and the press coverage was worldwide. Articles appeared in newspapers from Norway to Hong Kong and Chile. In 2008 some Dutch calendars started noting the first Sunday of September as the official Redheadday, a day honouring redheads. It complements Mothers Day and Father's Day, the celebrations honouring parents.

=== 2009 ===
The 2009 event took place on Saturday 5 and Sunday 6 September. The location was again the city of Breda. On Saturday, the focus was on visitors from abroad. On Sunday, the main event took place, with the traditional group photo in the main city park of Breda. There were about 50 activities, ranging from large artistic photo shoots by artists, to workshops with children, and lectures on different aspects of red hair.

== 2010s ==
=== 2010 ===
The 2010 event took place on Saturday 4 and Sunday 5 September. Again there were about 50 activities, ranging from large artistic photo shoots by artists, to workshops with children, and lectures on different aspects of red hair. This year however, the nature of the event was more international. Program booklets were provided in three languages (Dutch, English and German) and groups of redheads appeared with T-shirts and flags reflecting their home country, like Germany, France and Italy. This year, all hotels in the city center were booked full. The organisation estimated that 4,000 people with natural red hair came from thirty countries.

=== 2011 ===
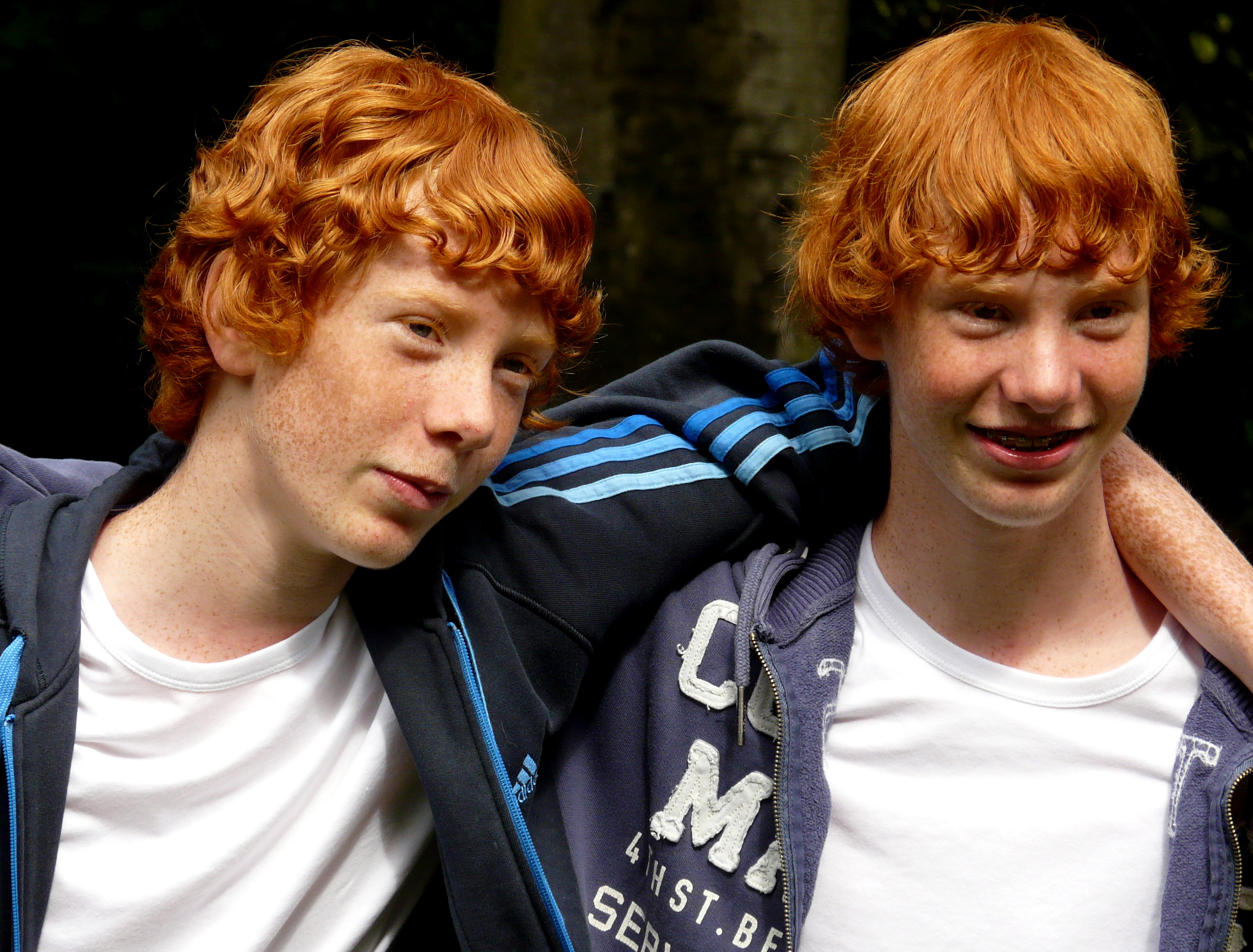
Redhead twins at the 2011 event

The 2011 event lasted from Friday September 2 to Sunday September 4. On Friday, an unofficial opening was held for the volunteers and some visitors from the Netherlands, Germany, UK, Ireland and the US. This year, there were more photoshoots. The organisation estimated that despite the forecast rain, the same number of visitors came to Breda, this time from over fifty countries.

=== 2012 ===
Breda played host to the 7th edition of the Redhead Days from 31 August to 2 September 2012. Owing to its large global appeal this festival officially changed its name from the Dutch "Roodharigendag" to the "Redhead Days". The event started with a Kick-off party at the Mezz in Breda on Friday evening 31 August where participants were treated to an abridged version of the documentary "Being Ginger" and a performance by the band "Convoi Exceptional".

The world record for the number of redheads in one place was also broken in this year with a total of 1255 redheads standing together for 10 minutes. According to the organisation approx 4 to 5 thousand from 60 countries attended the event. The media was represented from around the world including a documentary team from Australia.

=== 2013 ===
The 8th edition of the Redhead Days took place from 30 August to 1 September 2013. For the first time in this event's history the activities were partially sponsored by means of crowdfunding. For the second time the festival opened with a kick-off party at the Mezz in Breda during which the film LUIM MC1R by director Tjepke Zijlstra was shown and "Vanessa Voss and Band" performed. The documentary Being Ginger in a sold-out Chasse Theatre was shown twice during this year's event. Once again on Sunday 1 September the 2012 record of "redheads in one place" was broken. Under the watchful eye of an official Guinness Book of Records official the total number of 1,672 redheads in one place was recorded. The organisation confirmed that more than 5,000 redheads from 80 countries attended the event. Media teams from around the world also attended.

=== 2015 ===
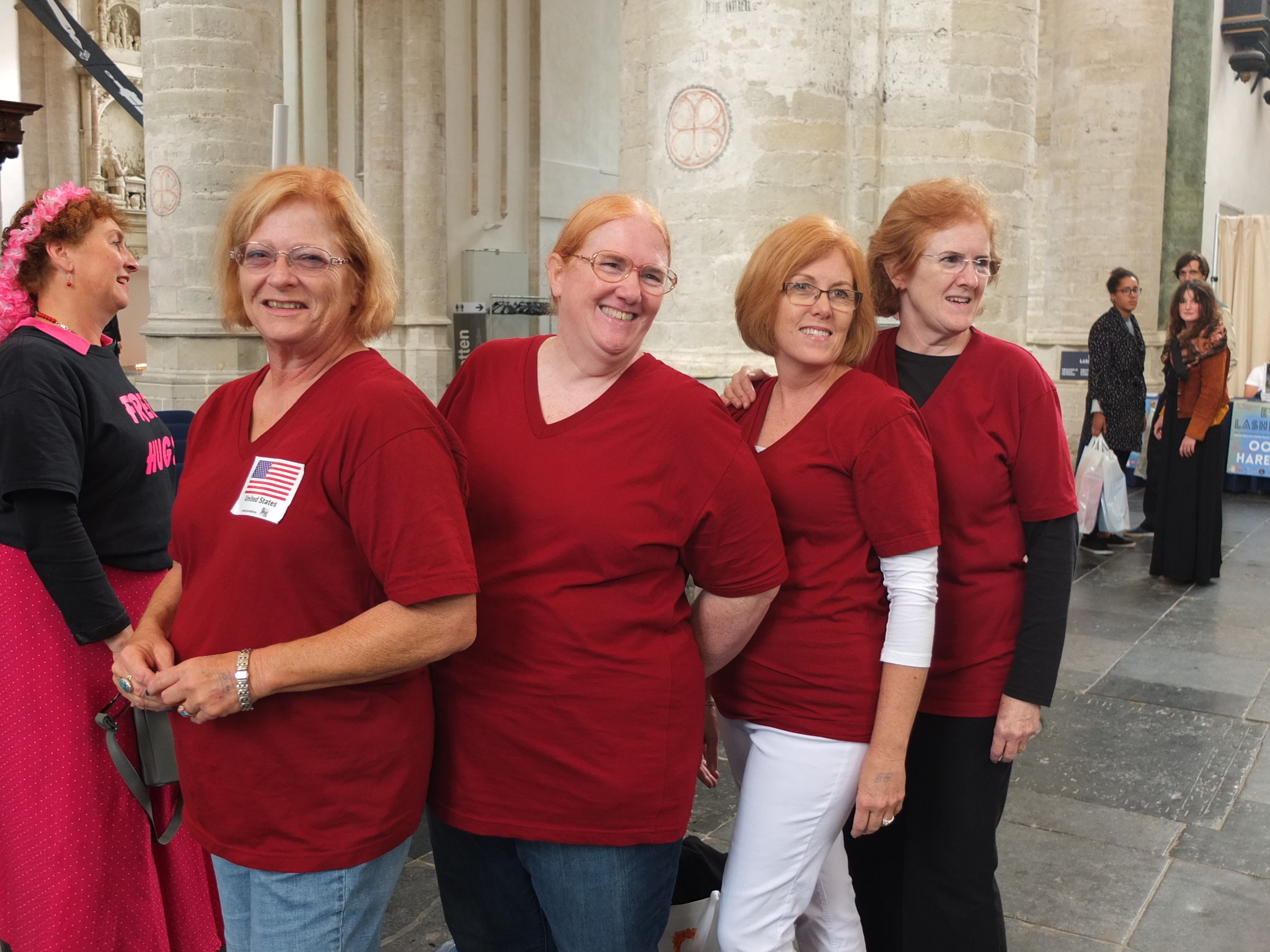
People at the 2015 event

In 2015 the Redhead Days celebrated its 10th anniversary with the special theme of Vincent van Gogh, exactly 125 years since the Dutch Grand Master's death. 2015 anniversary edition took place on 4–6 September 2015 in Breda.

=== 2016 ===
The 11th edition was held in Breda, and the year color was red. The group photo was made from the direction of the train station to the Valkenbergpark.

=== 2017 Global Friendship edition ===
The 12th edition of the festival had as theme Global Friendship and the color was green.

=== 2018 Umbrella edition ===
The 13th edition of the festival was the last one in Breda and was sponsored by insurance company AON. Owing to rain, this edition was named the umbrella edition.

=== Moving to a new city ===
The festival organisation decided to move the festival from Breda due to long lasting irregularities in the subsidies department at the local government of Breda. According to Dutch newspapers, advice on subsidies were given by people that had a personal interest in the outcome. In 2019 the local government Breda was found guilty in a lawsuit on this matter. The festival organisation visited several Dutch cities to look for a suitable new city to host the festival: Amersfoort, Dordrecht, Leeuwarden, Tilburg and Utrecht. Tilburg was chosen due to location, openness to new plans, new area developments like the Spoorzone and Spoorpark, and integrity of the local government: recently the Tilburg government won a prize for its integrity.

=== 2019 Tilburg edition ===
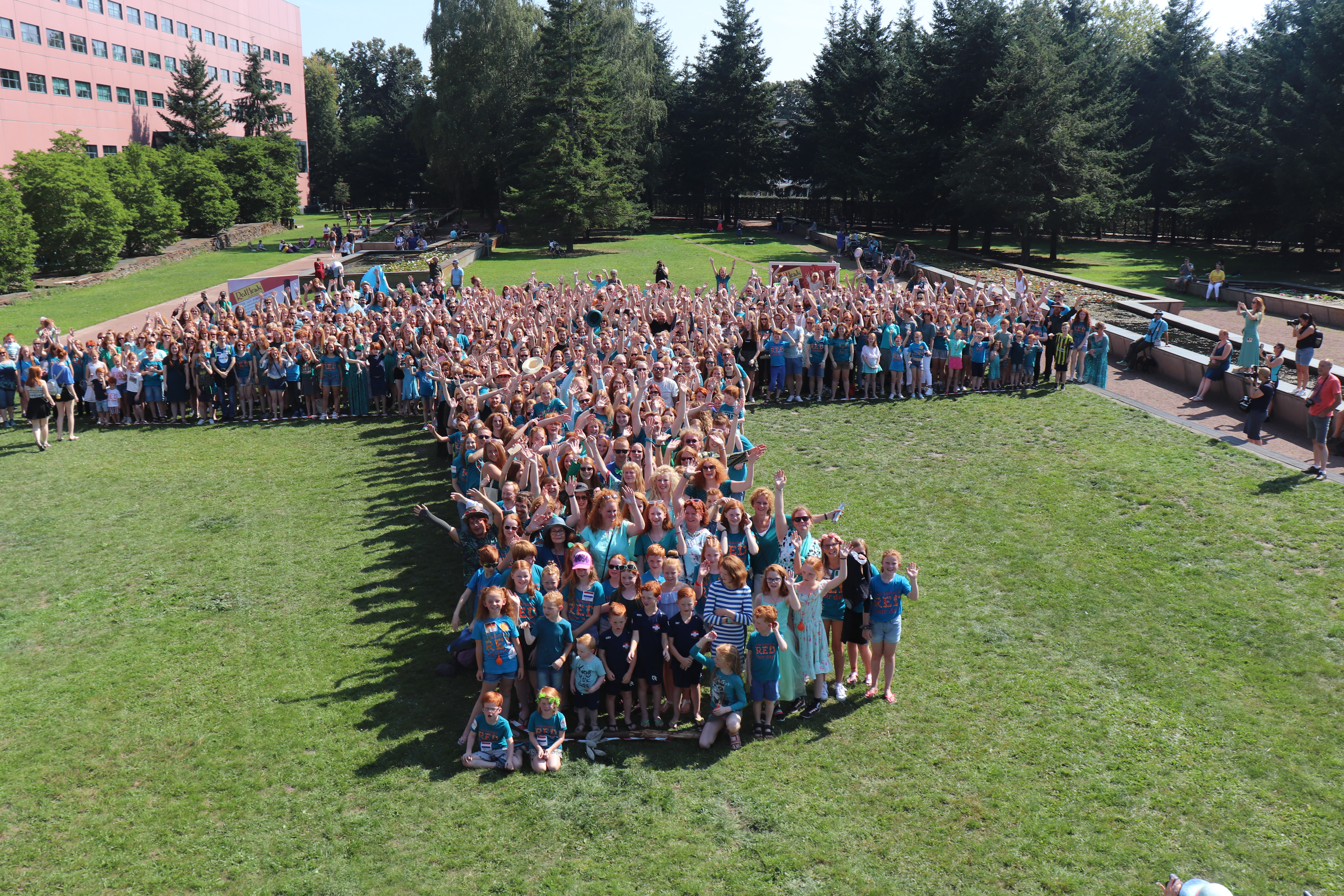
Redhead Days festival 2019, group photo

The 14th edition of the festival was the first time the festival was held in Tilburg. The color was blue and the main festival location was at the Pieter Vreedeplain. Other locations of activities were the Spoorpark (campsite), Heuvel, LocHal (lectures), and 013 (parties). Two group photos were made, the first one was in the form of a "T", honouring Tilburg.

== 2020s ==
=== 2020 ===
In 2020 the event, scheduled for 30 of November, was cancelled due to the COVID-19 pandemic.

=== 2021 14.5 edition ===
In 2021 it was long unsure whether the event could take place, due to COVID-19. Therefore, the festival was named the gathering, or the 14.5 edition and lasted from Friday evening August 27 to Sunday August 29. Also, several rules from the Dutch government had to be followed to keep the visitors safe. Owing to these rules, the traditional group photo had to be done while sitting down. Although severe travel restrictions were in place, the festival welcomed redheads from five continents and the group photo depicted 240 natural redheads. The festival was sponsored by 51 Hz and the local government of Tilburg. At this edition, some new activities were organized, like shared diners and a workshop model drawing.

=== 2022 Anniversary edition ===
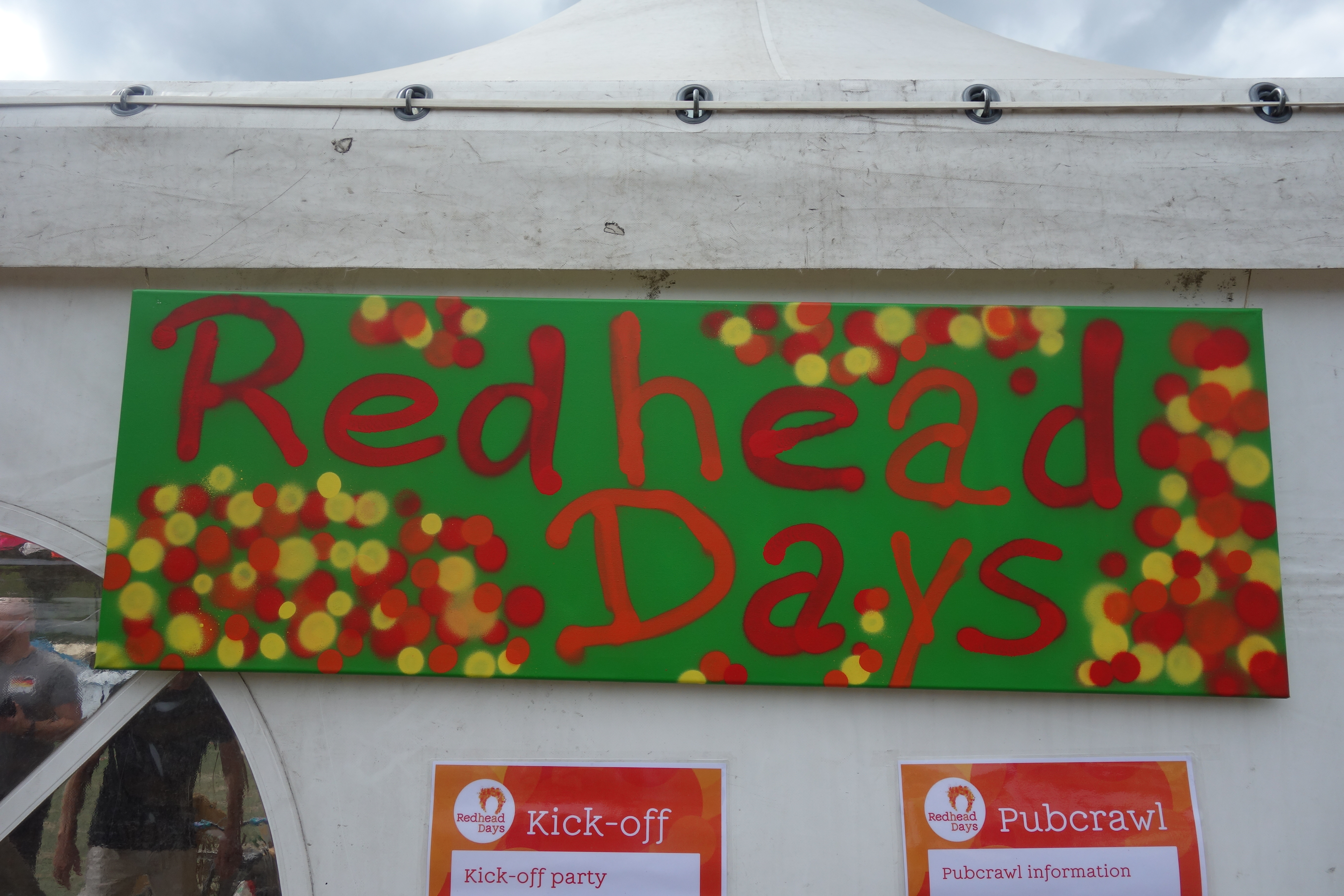
Redhead Days 2022

In 2022 the event celebrated its 15th anniversary. The organization created a record-breaking festival with many activities, ranging from pub-crawls to lectures, photo-shoots and workshops. For this edition, the festival campsite tripled in size.

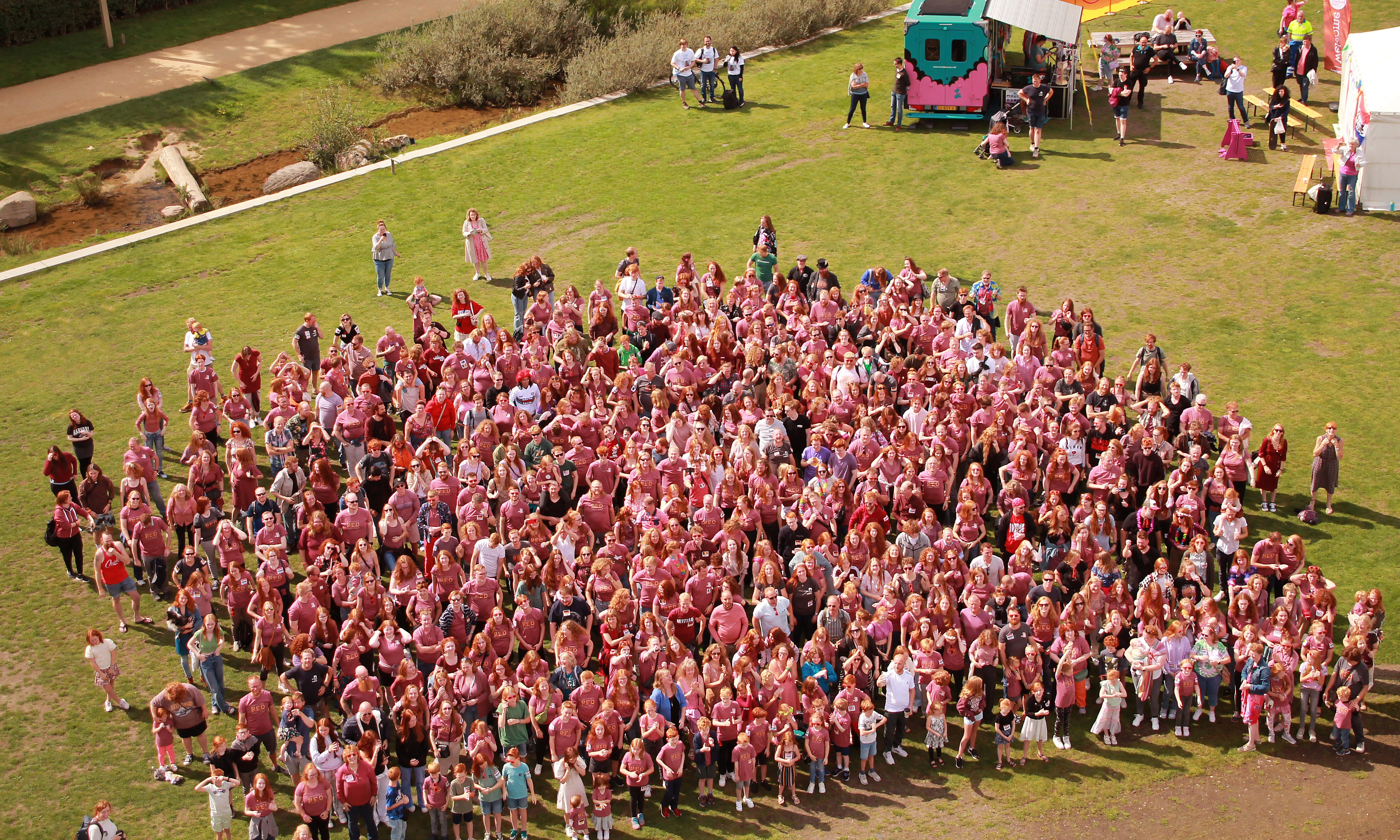
Groepsfoto 2023
