= Being Ginger =

2013 film

Being Ginger is a 2013 documentary/romantic comedy film directed, produced, and starring Scott P. Harris. It starts off as the filmmaker, an American redhead living in Scotland, goes on a quest to try to find a mythical woman who specifically likes ginger men. Over the course of the film it becomes more about the long-term impact of schoolyard bullying and self-acceptance.

== Plot ==
The film opens as filmmaker Scott P. Harris explains his unique experience as a redhead. He says he's had many female friends tell him they have a friend who just loves gingers, but he's never met one of them. He takes his camera to the local park to stop women and ask what they think of redheads.

The first woman he stops claims to really like redheads, which throws Scott for a loop. The film briefly turns into a romantic comedy as he tries to get a date with the woman, and seeks advice from his trusted friend, and co-editor, Ben. He eventually gets the date, but it doesn't go anywhere.

Throughout the film Scott's camerawoman tries to encourage him to date a redheaded woman, but he steadfastly refuses. First he states that redheads simply don't date each other, but he later opens up that he doesn't like redheads himself, which he thinks is just because of his own self-loathing that he's projecting on to every redhead he sees.

Unwilling to return to the park, Scott starts using an online dating site that claims to specifically cater to redheads and the people who like them. When that turns out to be a scam, he sinks to a new low and goes to a public square wearing a sandwich-board that reads, “Looking 4 a woman who likes gingers. Seriously.” While there he meets a particularly nasty woman who doesn't hold back in telling him that redheads are unattractive. She recounts the first time she saw a redhead being bullied, when she was in kindergarten, and assumes the boy just accepted that as a redhead this is what his life was going to be like.

That run in prompts Scott to open up about his own bullying experiences, including a particular nasty reoccurring experience when he was eight. Every day of second grade all of the students in his class would stand up to tell him they hated him, and when he cried the teacher threatened to beat him. It is the scar of that experience that shades everything else in his life.

Scott then learns of The Redhead Days, the world's largest redhead gathering which takes place every year in The Netherlands. Scott sends them a copy of the first act of the film, which was his graduation project from film school, and the festival asks to screen it.

Scott flies over to The Netherlands, and while at the festival, he becomes a bit of a local celebrity. It's the first time in his life he's been the center of attention and not had it accompanied with serious emotional pain, which causes a major breakthrough for him. He also meets and falls for a beautiful redheaded woman who has flown over from the US to attend the festival.

The film ends on the promise that the two redheads will soon go on their first proper date together.

== Production ==
The film took over two years to make. It was shot in Edinburgh, Scotland, and Breda, The Netherlands. In September 2012 Scott launched a Kickstarter campaign to raise money to pay for post-production. He raised $12,869.

== Release and reception ==
The film was released online on August 23, 2013, the same weekend it screened at The Irish Redhead Convention. A week later it screened at The Redhead Days in the Netherlands. In January 2014, Scott started traveling around the country to attend individual screenings of the film in Austin, Dallas, Seattle, Portland, San Francisco, Los Angeles, Boston, and Tampa.

In April 2014 the film had a small theatrical release in the US and later Canada. In January 2016 the film was licensed to Netflix for two years.

The film received highly favorable reviews from critics, with Jeannette Catsoulis of The New York Times calling it "Sweet, funny, and ultimately rather touching". She described Harris's candor and vulnerability as "enormously endearing". Frank Scheck of The Hollywood Reporter called it "entertaining and enlightening".

Review aggregation website Rotten Tomatoes gives the film a score of 92% based on reviews from 12 critics, with an average score of 7.12/10. The New York Times named it a Critics' Pick.

== Sequel ==
The last credit of the film announces that Scott will return in a film called "An American Ginger In Paris." In September 2014 he launched a Kickstarter campaign and raised $15,788. The film is currently in production.
