= Red hair =

Human hair color

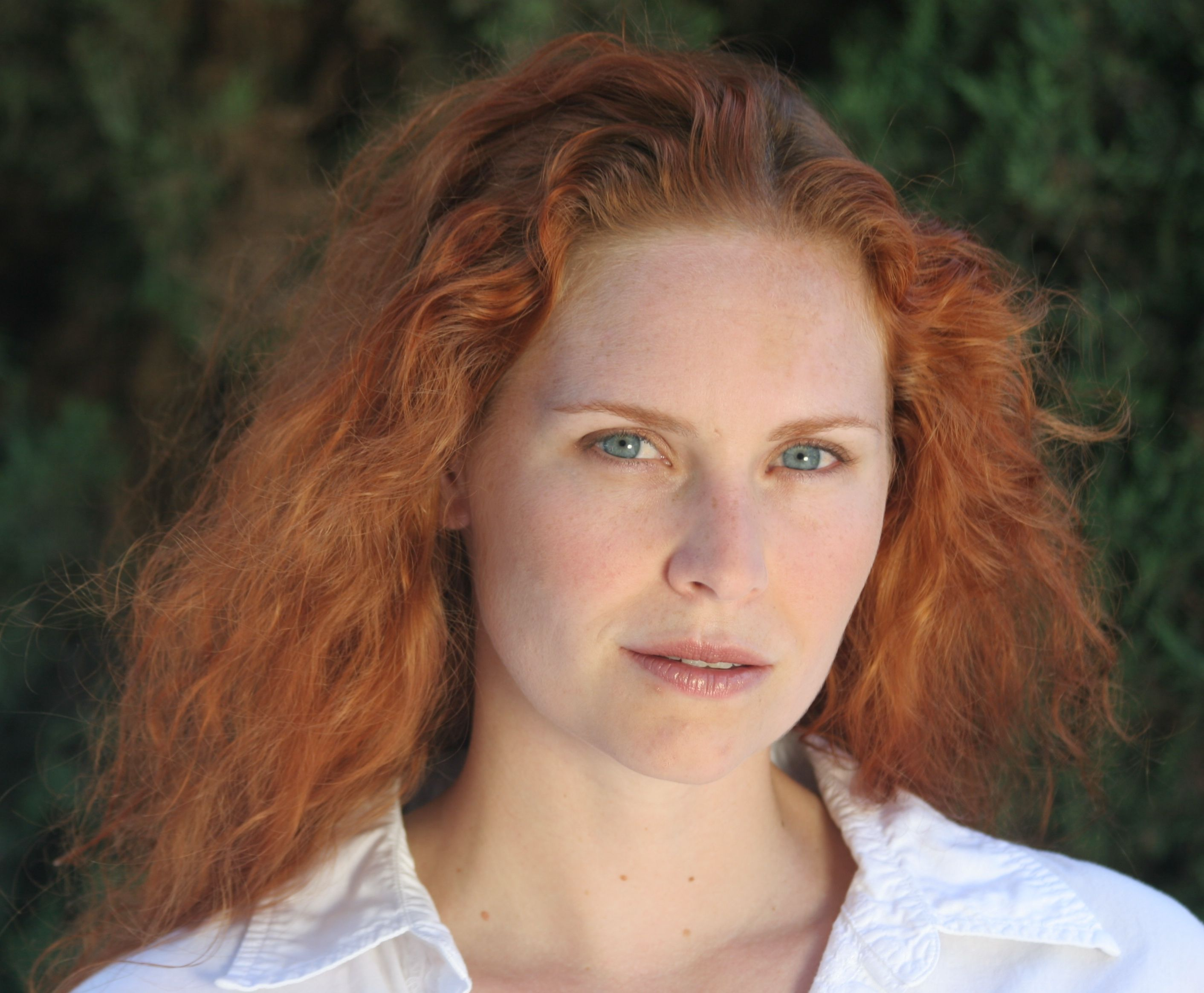
Woman with red hair

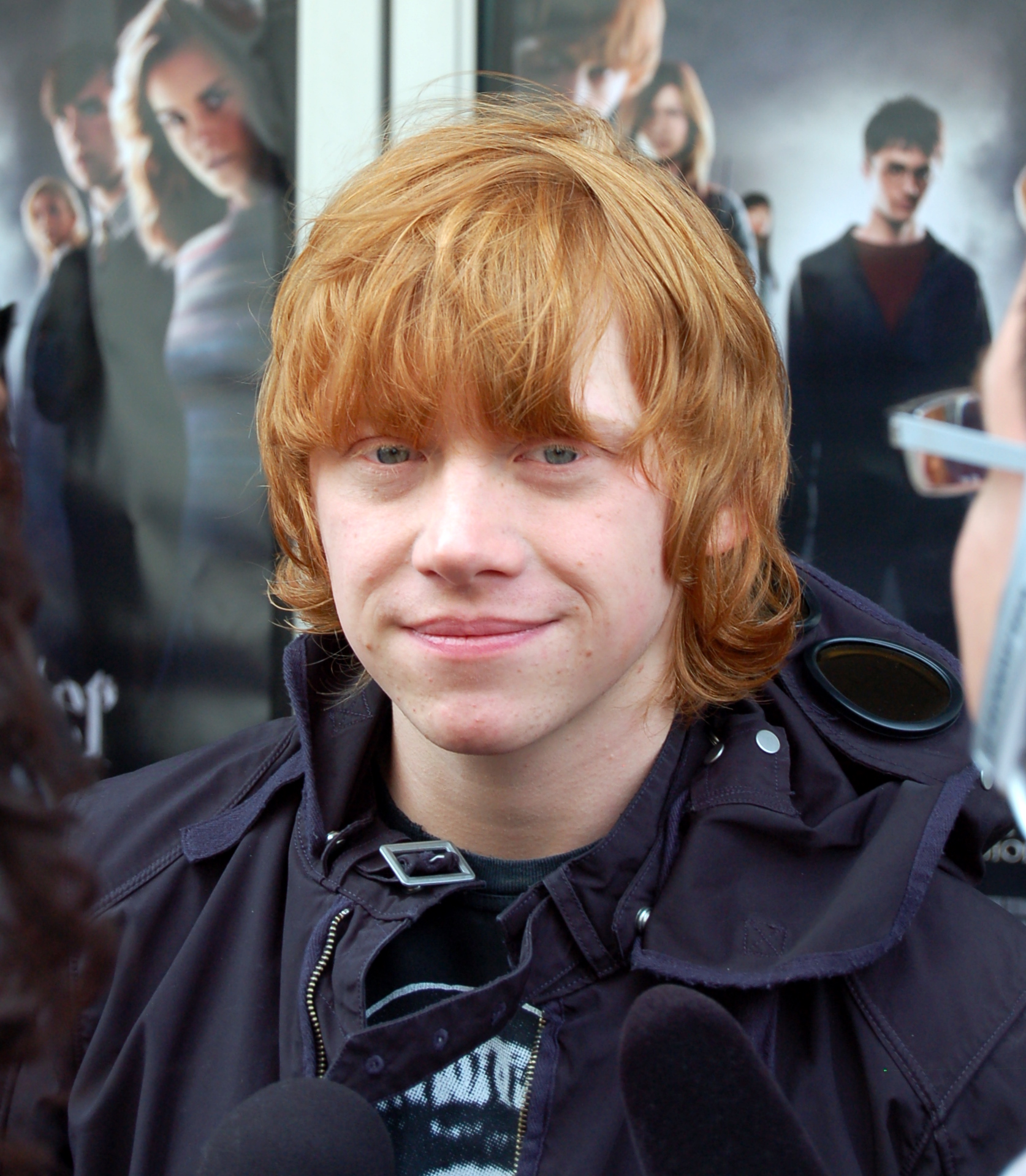
Actor Rupert Grint with red hair

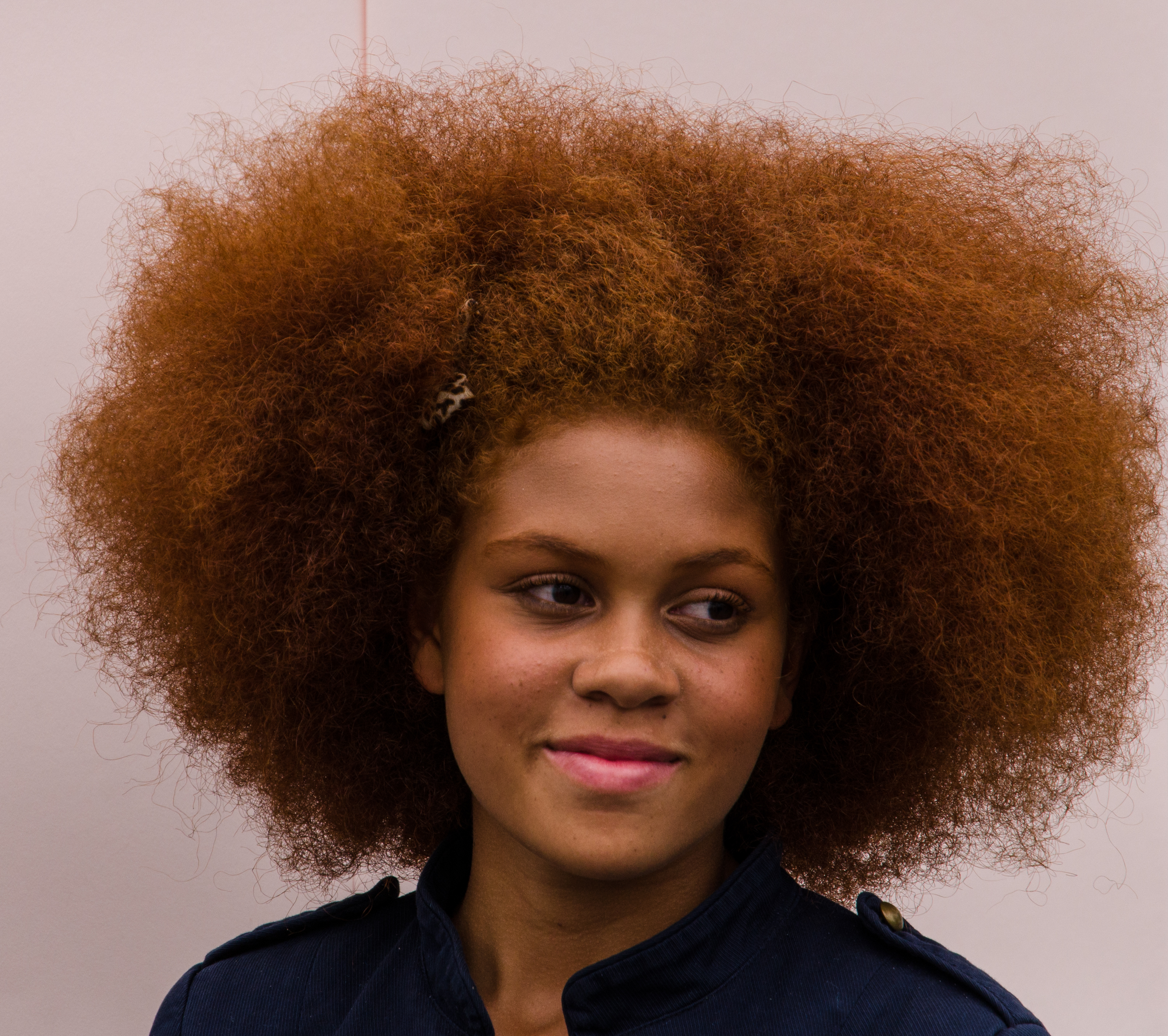
Woman with red hair

Red hair, also known as ginger hair, is a human hair color found in 2–6% of people of Northwestern European ancestry, typically those of Celtic ancestry, and smaller amounts in other populations. It is most common in individuals homozygous for a recessive allele on chromosome 16 that produces an altered version of the MC1R protein.

Red hair varies in hue from a deep burgundy or bright copper, or auburn, to burnt orange or red-orange to strawberry blond. Characterized by high levels of the reddish pigment pheomelanin and relatively low levels of the dark pigment eumelanin, it is typically most associated with type I or II of the Fitzpatrick scale, freckles, and sensitivity to ultraviolet light, although it is also frequent in darker skinned individuals of different races.

Cultural reactions to red hair have been varied. The term "redhead" has been in use since at least 1510, while the term "ginger" is sometimes used, especially in Britain and Ireland, to describe a person with red hair.

== Geographic distribution ==
=== Modern ===
==== Northwestern Europe ====
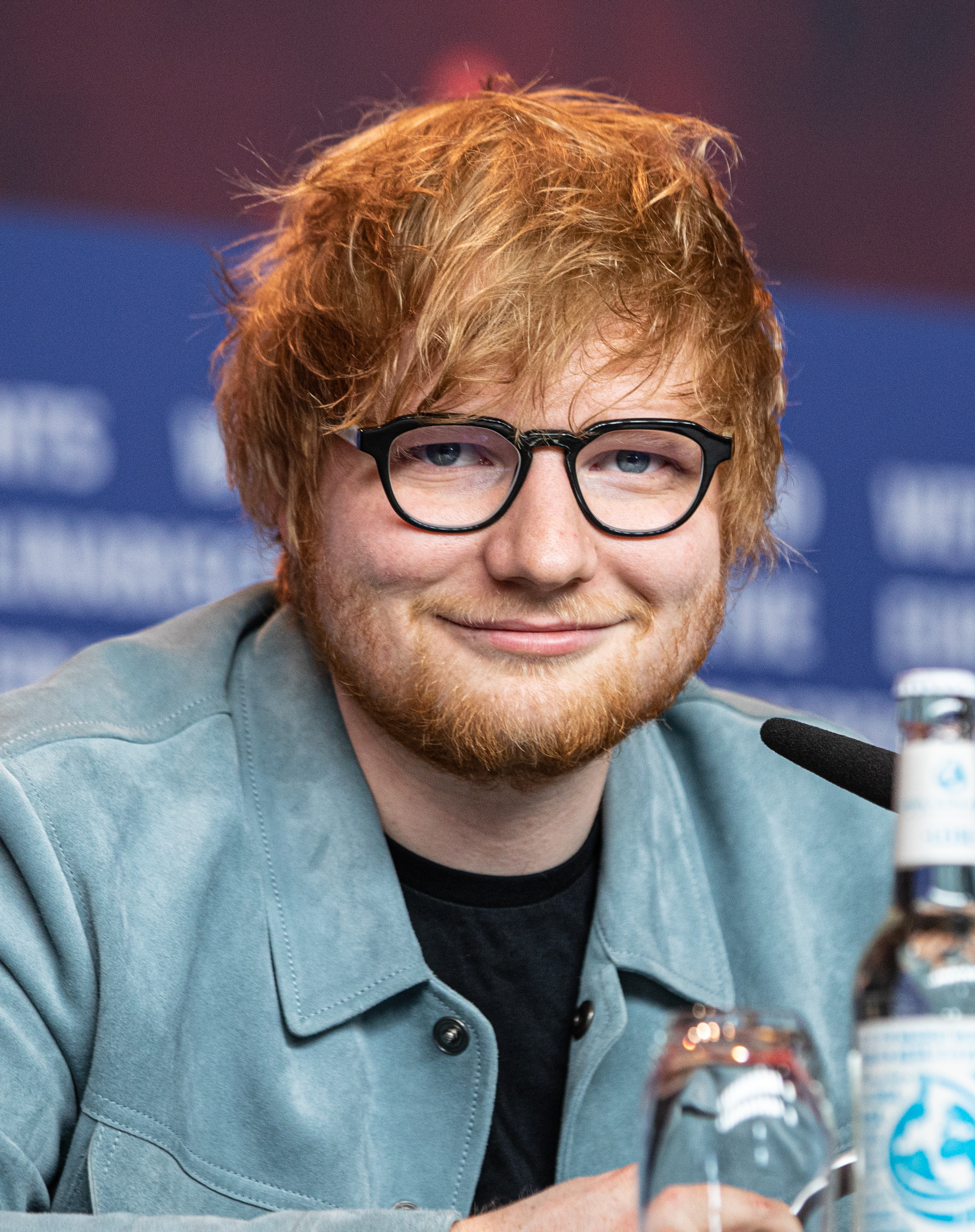
Ed Sheeran, English singer of Irish ancestry

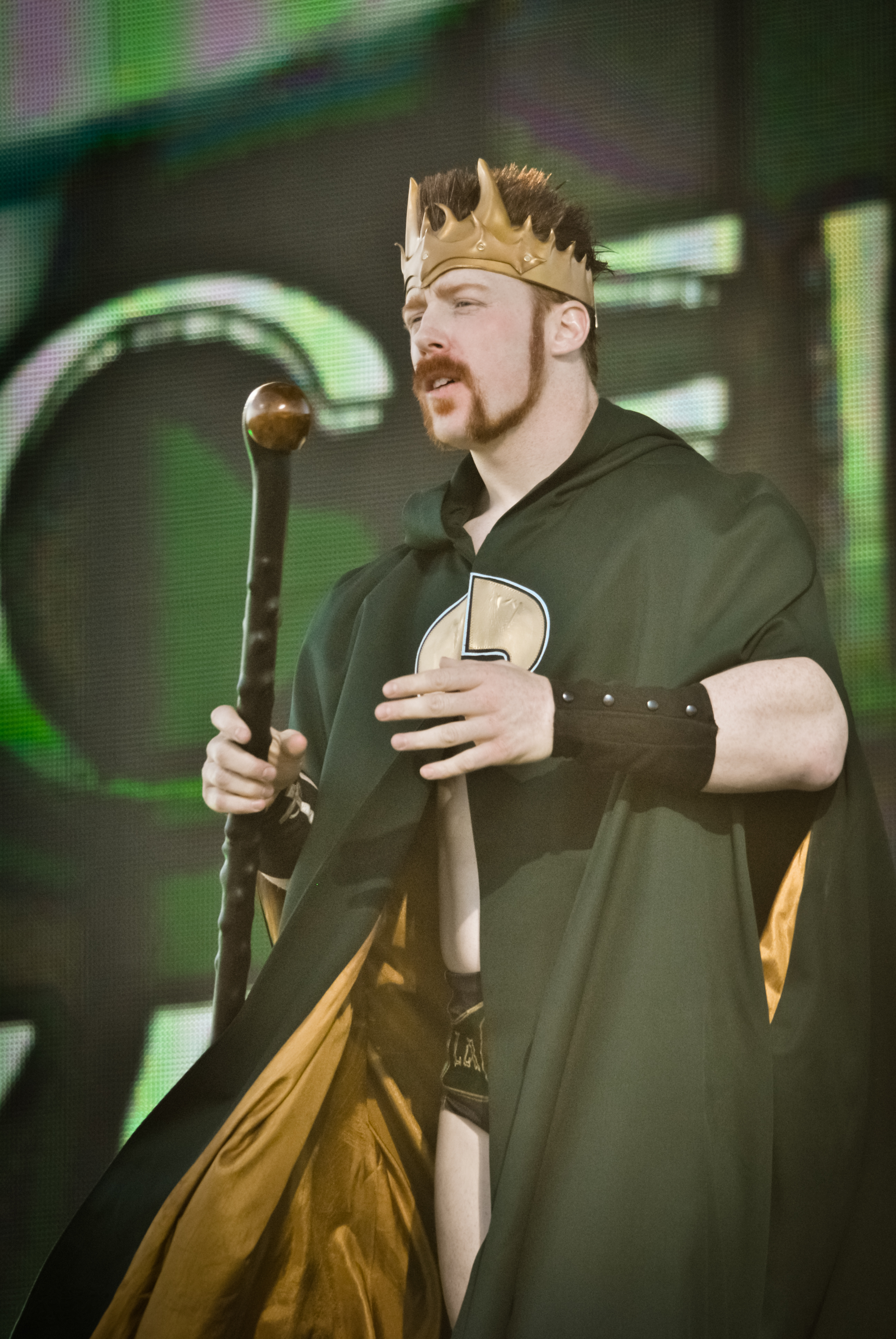
Irish professional wrestler Sheamus

Red hair is most commonly found at the northwestern fringes of Europe; it is centred around populations in the British Isles and is particularly associated with the Celtic nations.

Scotland has the highest number of red-haired people per capita in the world, with the percentage of those with red hair at around 13%, followed by Ireland and Wales. The highest concentration of red head carriers in the world is found in Edinburgh. Red hair gene variants in Scotland are most frequent in the south-east, with 40% of people being carriers of them. The lowest prevalence of red hair gene bearers are found in the Gaelic, North-West and Hebrides, where only 29% of people carry them, which is comparable to Cornwall and Devon in South West England. Another study, the largest ever study of hair colour in Scotland, which analysed over 500,000 people, found the percentage of Scots with red hair to be slightly lower at 5.3%.

==== Jewish peoples ====
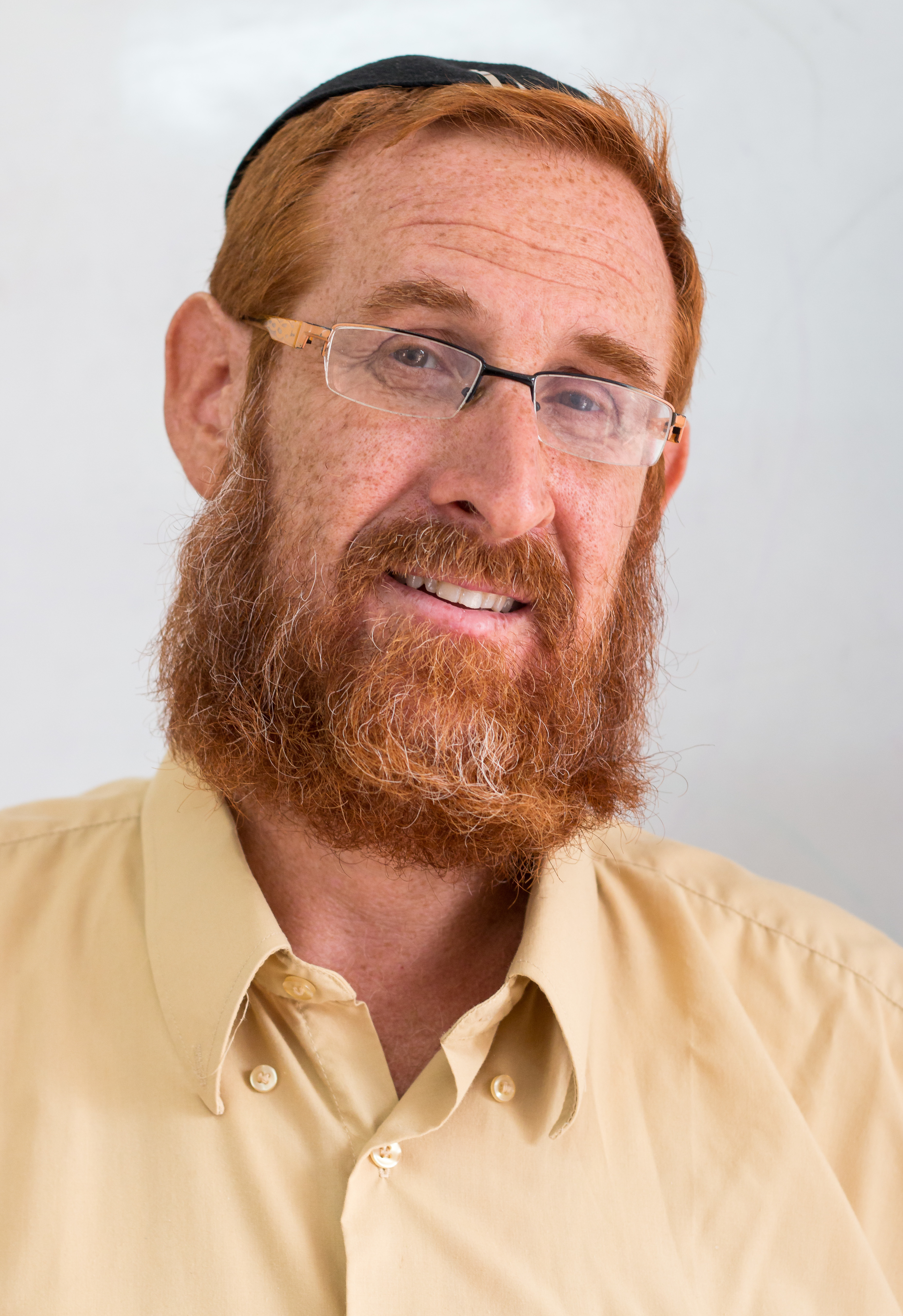
Yehuda Glick, American-Israeli rabbi and right-wing activist

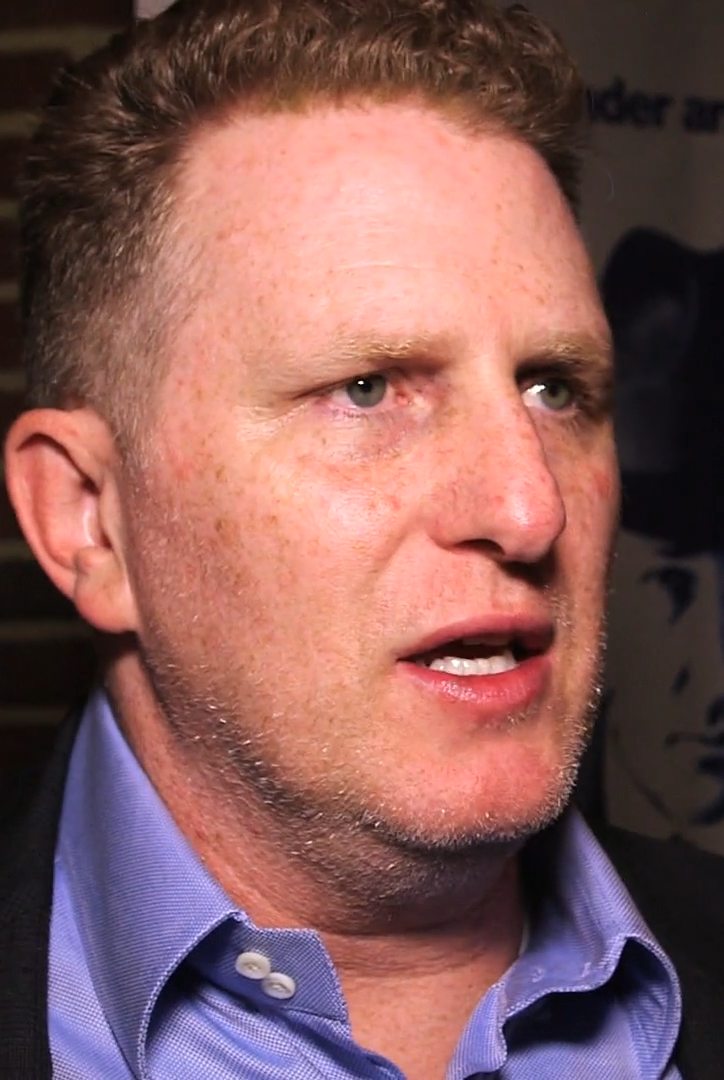
Jewish American actor Michael Rapaport

Red hair is also commonly found amongst Jewish populations. In 1903, 5.6% of Polish Jews had red hair. Other studies have found that 3.69% of Jewish women overall were found to have red hair, but around 10.9% of all Jewish men have red beards. In European culture before the 20th century red hair was often seen as a stereotypically Jewish trait. During the Spanish Inquisition, all those with red hair were identified as Jewish. In Italy, red hair was associated with Italian Jews. Additionally, Judas was traditionally depicted as red-haired in European art. The stereotype that red hair is Jewish remains in parts of Eastern Europe and Russia.

==== Eastern Europe ====
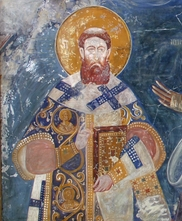
Saint Sava, Serbian prince and Orthodox monk, was a redhead.

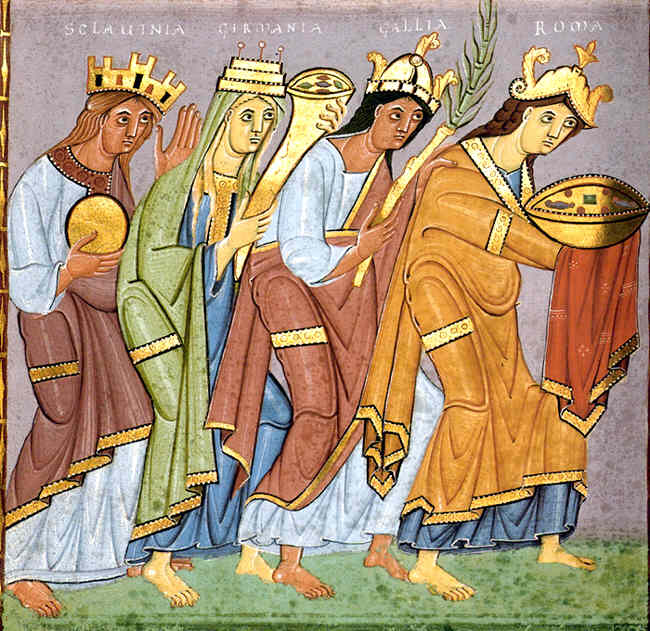
Depiction of an early Slav, 990 AD

Byzantine writers Jordanes and Procopius described the early Slavic peoples as having ruddy hair and skin tone.

In the late 18th century, ethnographers considered the Finno-Ugric Udmurt people of the Volga Region in Russia to be "the most red-headed men in the world". The Volga region still has one of the highest percentages of red-headed people.

==== Southern Europe ====
In Italy, red hair is found at a frequency of 0.57% of the total population, without variation in frequency across the different regions of the country. In Sardinia, red hair is found at a frequency of 0.24% of the population.

==== North Africa and Mediterranean ====
The Berber populations of Morocco and northern Algeria have occasional redheads. Red hair frequency is especially significant among the Riffians from Morocco and Kabyles from Algeria, respectively.

==== Asia (all regions) ====
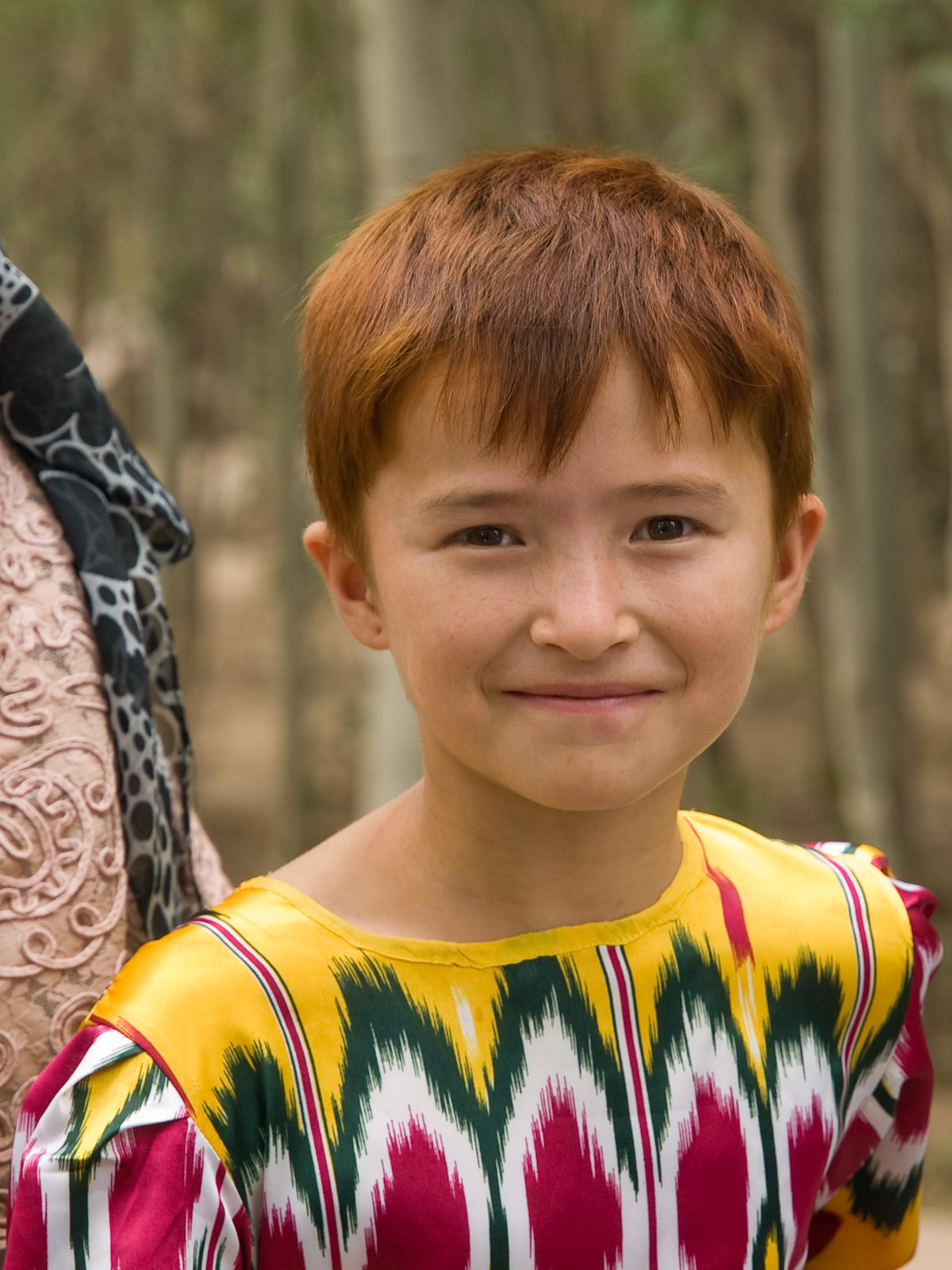
A Uyghur child in Kashgar, China's Xinjiang region, with auburn hair

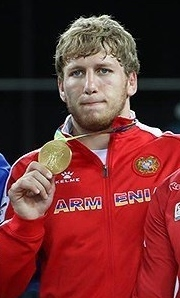
Artur Aleksanyan, Armenian Greco-Roman wrestler Olympic Champion 2016

In Asia, red hair can be found among some peoples of Afghan, Arab, Iranian, Armenian, East Indians, Mongolian, Turkic, Miao, and Hmong descent.

Several preserved samples of human hair have been obtained from an Iron Age cemetery in Khakassia, South Siberia. Many of the hair samples appear red in color, and one skull from the cemetery had a preserved red moustache.

Genetic evidence of a red hair and blue eye genome was discovered in the ancient human remains of the Areni-1 cave in Armenia, dating back to the Chalcolithic (4300–3500 BCE) period.

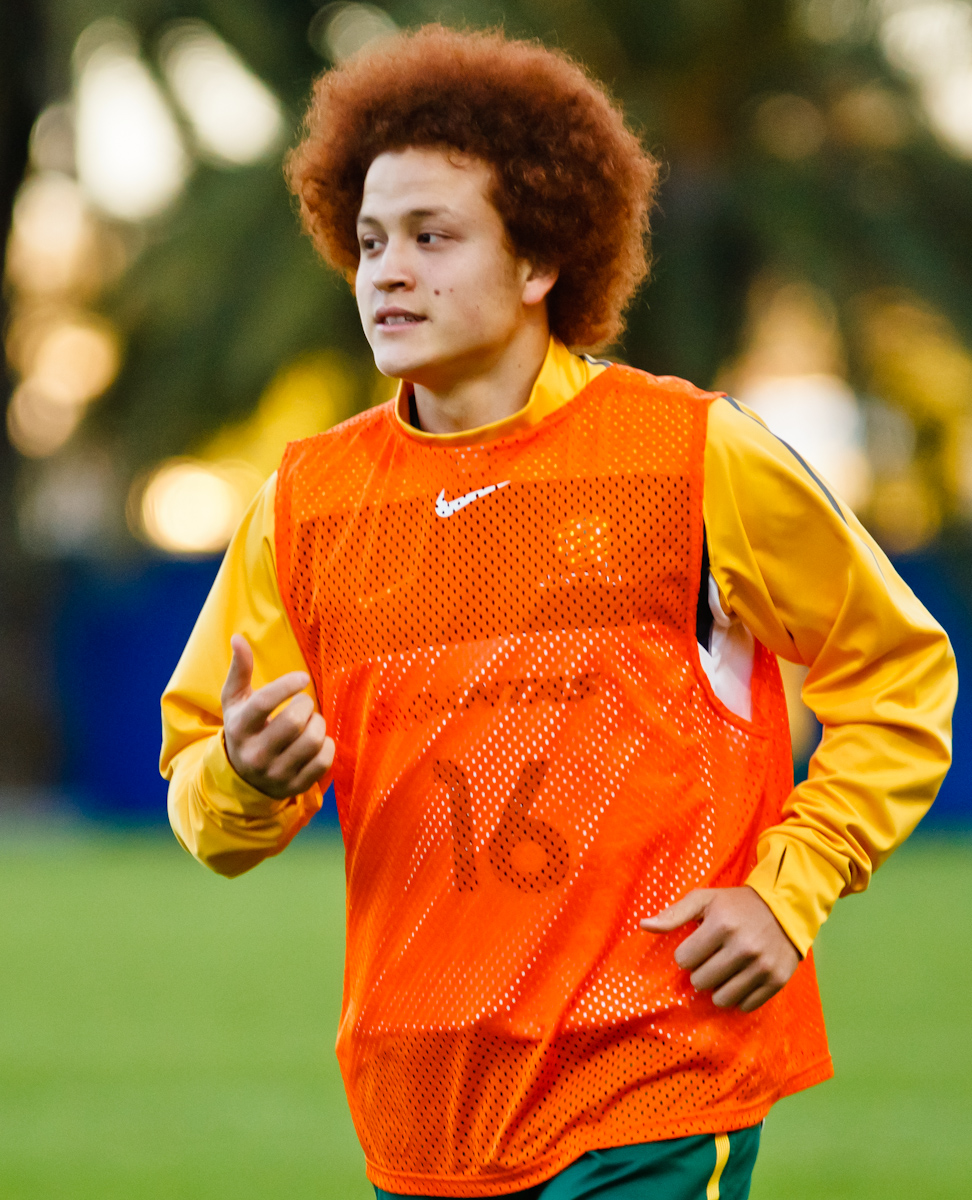
Mustafa Amini, Australian footballer of Afghan and Nicaraguan descent

Ancient human remains described as having red or auburn hair have been discovered in various parts of Asia, including the Tarim mummies of Xinjiang, China. In Chinese sources, ancient Kyrgyz people were described as fair-skinned, green- or blue-eyed and red-haired people with a mixture of European and East Asian features. In the Book of Wei, Chinese author Wei Shou notes that Liu Yuan was over 6 feet (1.8 m) tall and had red strands of hair in his long beard. The ethnic Miao people of China are recorded with red hair. According to F.M Savina of the Paris Foreign Missionary Society, the appearance of the Miao was "pale yellow in complexion, almost white, their hair is often light or dark brown, sometimes even red or corn-silk blond, and a few even have pale blue eyes". A phenotype study of Hmong people shows they are sometimes born with red hair.

The Kipchak people were a Turkic ethnic group from Central Asia who served in the Golden Horde military forces after being conquered by the Mongols. In the Chinese historical document Kang mu, the Kipchak people are described as red haired and blue-eyed.

==== Americas, Oceania and Sub-Saharan Africa ====
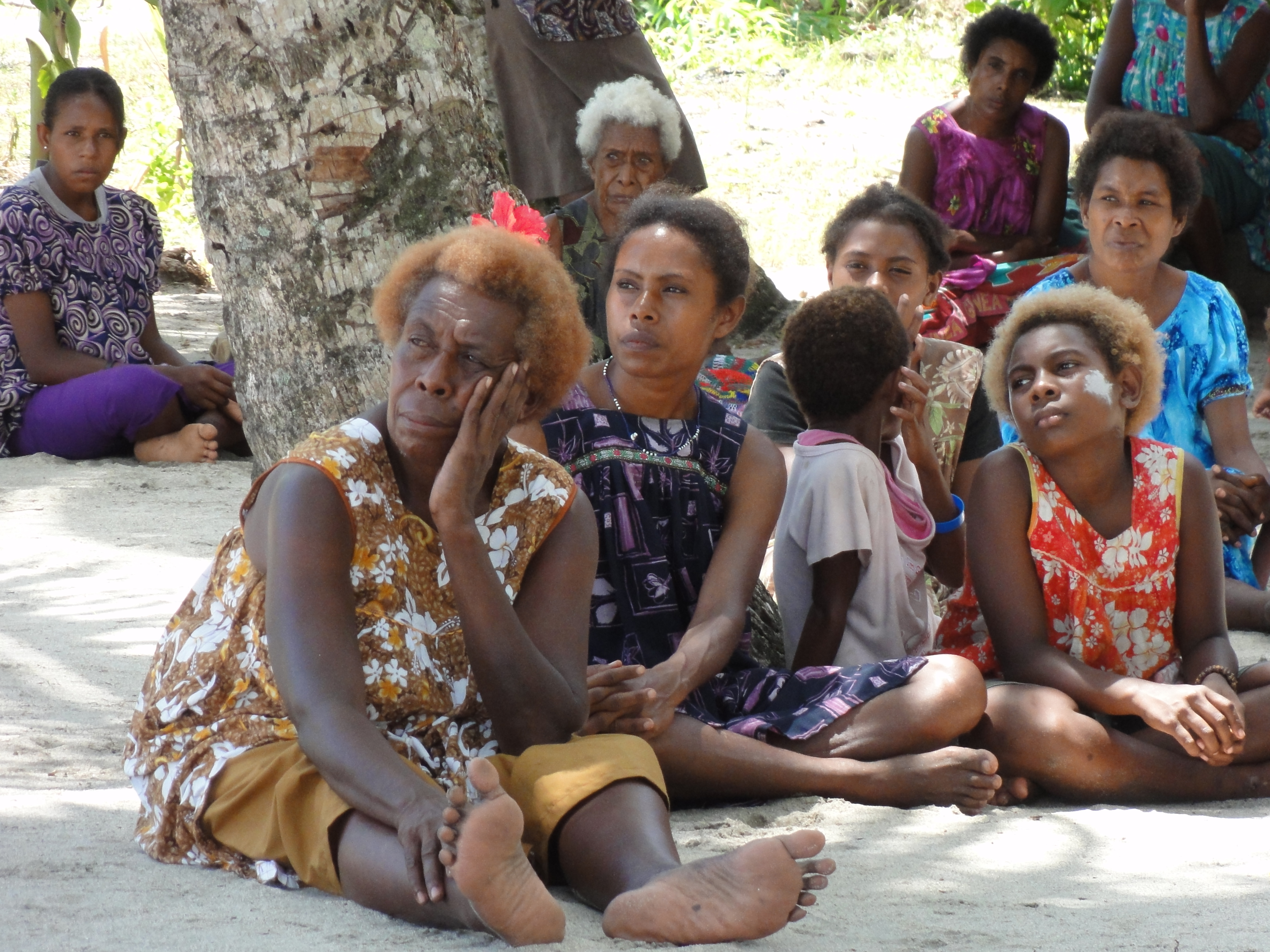
Two women with mixed reddish-brown hair, Papua New Guinea. Melanesians have a significant incidence of mixed-fair hair, caused by a genetic mutation different from European blond and red hair.

Reddish-brown (auburn) hair is also found among some Polynesians, and is especially common in some tribes and family groups. In Polynesian culture, reddish hair has traditionally been seen as a sign of descent from high-ranking ancestors and a mark of rulership. Emigration from Europe has increased the population of red haired humans in the Americas, Australia, New Zealand and South Africa.

=== Historical ===
Several accounts by Greek writers mention redheaded people. A fragment by the poet Xenophanes describes the Thracians as blue-eyed and red-haired. The ancient Budini and Sarmatians are also reported by some classical Greek authors to be blue-eyed and red-haired. It was once believed that Sarmatians owed their name to their red hair, but this claim was later debunked.

In Asia, red or auburn hair has been found among the ancient Tocharians, who occupied the Tarim Basin in what is now the northwesternmost province of China. Tarim mummies have been found with red hair dating to the 2nd millennium BC.

In certain Biblical accounts, Hebrew and Israelite individuals were described as having ruddy hair. For example, Esau and David (Gen. 25:25; 1 Sam. 16:12, 17:42.), are described in the Masoretic text as "admoni", meaning red or ruddy, although Josephus described David as golden haired and Esau as red haired.

== Biochemistry and genetics ==
The pigment pheomelanin gives red hair its distinctive color. Red hair has far more of the pigment pheomelanin than it has of the dark pigment eumelanin.

The genetics of red hair appear to be associated with the melanocortin-1 receptor (MC1R), which is found on chromosome 16. In 1995, Valverde, et al. identified alleles on MC1R associated with red hair. The number of alleles linked to red hair has since been expanded by other authors, and these variants are now identified as the RHC (red hair colour) alleles. Eighty percent of redheads have an MC1R gene variant within the RHC. Red hair is also associated with fair skin color because the MC1R mutation also results in low concentrations of eumelanin throughout the body. The lower melanin concentration in skin confers the advantage that a sufficient concentration of important vitamin D can be produced under low light conditions. However, when UV-radiation is strong (as in regions close to the equator) the lower concentration of melanin leads to several medical disadvantages, such as a higher risk of skin cancer. The MC1R variant gene that gives people red hair generally results in skin that is difficult or impossible to tan. Because of the natural tanning reaction to the sun's ultraviolet light and high amounts of pheomelanin in the skin, freckles are a common, but not universal, feature of red-haired people.

Red hair can originate from several changes on the MC1R-gene. If one of these changes is present on both chromosomes, then the respective individual is likely to have red hair. This type of inheritance is described as an autosomal recessive. Even if both parents do not have red hair themselves, both can be carriers for the gene and have a redheaded child.

Genetic studies of dizygotic (fraternal) twins indicate that the MC1R gene is not solely responsible for the red hair phenotype; unidentified modifier genes exist, making variance in the MC1R gene necessary, but not sufficient, for red hair production.

=== Genetics ===
The alleles Arg151Cys, Arg160Trp, Asp294His, and Arg142His on MC1R are shown to be recessives for the red hair phenotype. The gene HCL2 on chromosome 4 may also be related to red hair. There are at least 8 genetic differences associated with red hair color.

In species other than primates, red hair has different genetic origins and mechanisms.

=== Beards ===
The genes responsible for red hair can express themselves to different extents in different people. One consequence of this is that a number of people have both dark hair and red beards. This may reflect the presence of a single copy of the MC1R gene, leading to differential expression in the beard versus the scalp hair. However, some red-bearded people lack MC1R genes.

=== Evolution ===
==== Origins ====
Red hair is the rarest natural hair color in humans. The non-tanning skin associated with red hair may have been advantageous in far-northern climates where sunlight is scarce. Studies by Bodmer and Cavalli-Sforza (1976) hypothesized that lighter skin pigmentation prevents rickets in colder climates by encouraging higher levels of vitamin D production and also allows the individual to retain heat better than someone with darker skin. In 2000, Harding et al. concluded that red hair is not the result of positive selection but of a lack of negative selection. In Africa, for example, red hair is selected against because high levels of sun harm pale skin. However, in Northern Europe this does not happen, so redheads can become more common through genetic drift.

Estimates on the original occurrence of the currently active gene for red hair vary from 20,000 to 100,000 years ago.

A DNA study of Neanderthal genomes determined that the MC1R gene resulting in red hair in modern humans was not present in Neanderthal, and "if variants contributing to red hair were present in Neanderthals, they were probably not at high frequency."

==== Extinction hoax ====
A 2007 report in The Courier-Mail, which cited the National Geographic magazine and unnamed "geneticists", said that red hair is likely to die out in the near future. Other blogs and news sources ran similar stories that attributed the research to the magazine or the "Oxford Hair Foundation". However, a HowStuffWorks article says that the foundation was funded by hair-dye maker Procter & Gamble, and that other experts had dismissed the research as either lacking in evidence or simply bogus. The National Geographic article in fact states, "while redheads may decline, the potential for red isn't going away".

Red hair is caused by a relatively rare recessive allele, the expression of which can skip generations. It is not likely to disappear at any time in the foreseeable future.

== Medical implications of the red hair gene ==
=== Melanoma ===
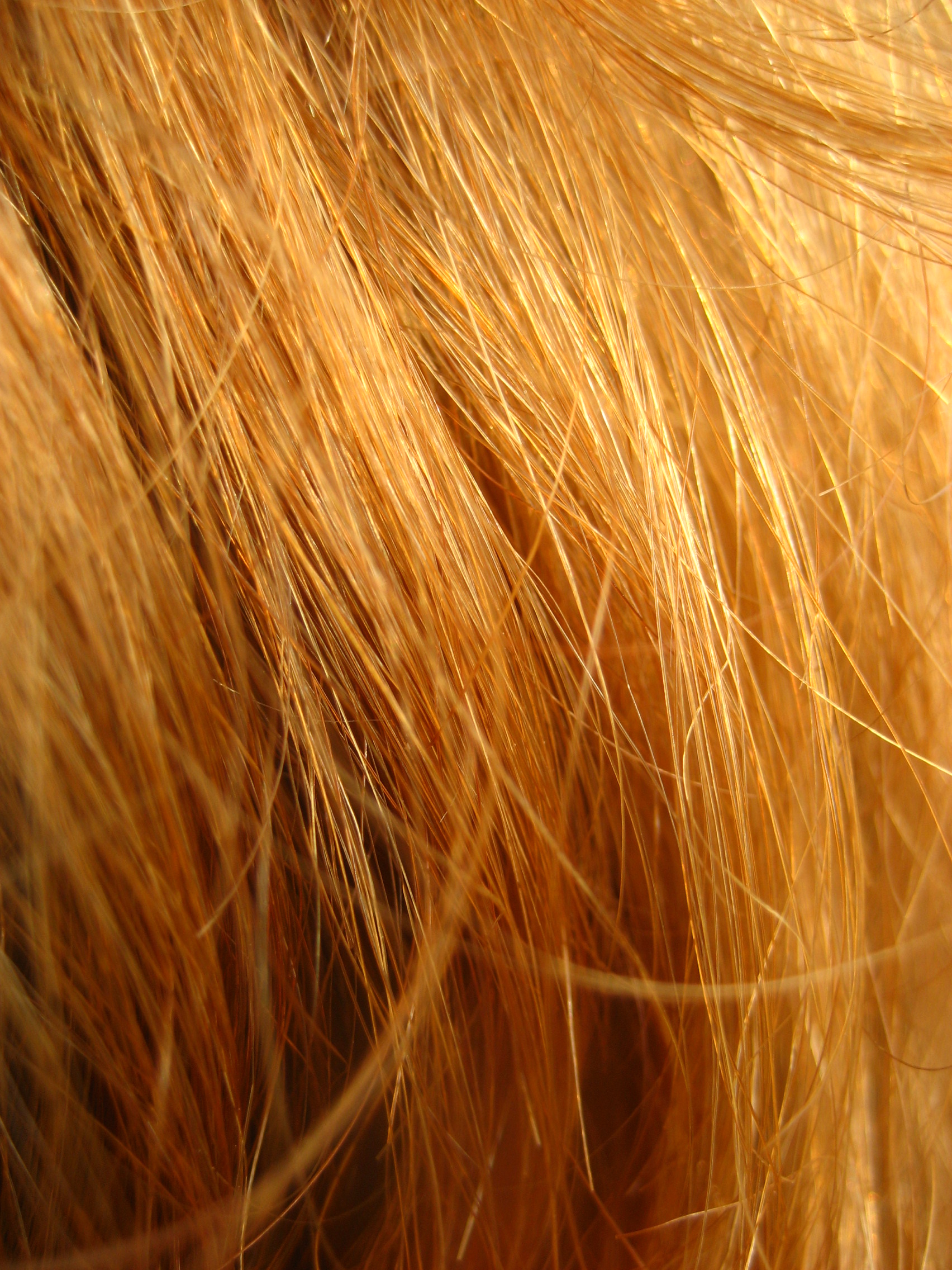
A close-up view of straight red hair

Melanin in the skin aids UV tolerance through sun tanning, but fair-skinned persons lack the levels of melanin needed to prevent UV-induced DNA-damage. Studies have shown that red hair alleles in MC1R increase freckling and decrease tanning ability. It has been found that Europeans who are heterozygous for red hair exhibit increased sensitivity to UV radiation.

Red hair and its relationship to UV sensitivity are of interest to many melanoma researchers. Sunshine can both be good and bad for a person's health and the different alleles on MC1R represent these adaptations. It also has been shown that individuals with pale skin are highly susceptible to a variety of skin cancers such as melanoma, basal cell carcinoma, and squamous cell carcinoma.

=== Pain tolerance and injury ===
Two studies have demonstrated that people with red hair have different sensitivity to pain to people with other hair colors. One study found that women with red hair are slightly more sensitive to thermal pain (associated with naturally occurring low vitamin K levels) and that lidocaine was significantly less effective in reducing pain. Another study concluded that redheads are less sensitive to pain from multiple modalities, including noxious stimuli such as electrically induced pain.

Researchers have found that people with red hair require greater amounts of anesthetic. Another study showed women with gene variants associated with red hair had a greater analgesic response to the painkiller pentazocine than do either women of other hair colors or men of any hair color. A follow-up study by the same group showed that men and women with red hair had a greater analgesic response to morphine-6-glucuronide. However, a later study of 468 healthy adult patients found no significant difference in recovery times, pain scores, or quality of recovery in those with red hair compared with dark hair in either men or women.

The unexpected relationship of hair color to pain tolerance appears to exist because redheads have a mutation in a hormone receptor that can apparently respond to at least two types of hormones: the pigmentation-driving melanocyte-stimulating hormone (MSH), and the pain-relieving endorphins (both derive from the same precursor molecule, POMC, and are structurally similar). Specifically, redheads have a mutated melanocortin-1 receptor (MC1R) gene that produces an altered receptor for MSH. Melanocytes, the cells that produce pigment in skin and hair, use the MC1R to recognize and respond to MSH from the anterior pituitary gland. Melanocyte-stimulating hormones normally stimulates melanocytes to make black eumelanin, but if the melanocytes have a mutated receptor, they will make reddish pheomelanin instead. MC1R also occurs in the brain, where it is one of a large set of POMC-related receptors that are apparently involved not only in responding to MSH, but also in responses to endorphins and possibly other POMC-derived hormones. Though the details are not clearly understood, it appears that there is some crosstalk between the POMC hormones that may explain the link between red hair and pain tolerance.

There is little or no evidence to support the belief that people with red hair have a higher chance than people with other hair colors to hemorrhage or suffer other bleeding complications. One study, however, reports a link between red hair and a higher rate of bruising.

== Red hair of pathological origin ==
Most red hair is caused by the MC1R gene and is non-pathological. However, in rare cases red hair can be associated with disease or genetic disorders:

- In cases of severe malnutrition, normally dark human hair may turn red or blonde. The condition, part of a syndrome known as kwashiorkor, is a sign of critical starvation caused chiefly by protein deficiency, and is common during periods of famine.
- One variety of albinism (Type 3, a.k.a. rufous albinism), sometimes seen in Africans and inhabitants of New Guinea, results in red hair and red-colored skin.
- Red hair is found on people lacking pro-opiomelanocortin.

There have also been rare reports of scalp or beard hair spontaneously turning partially red, with no identified pathological cause.

== Culture ==
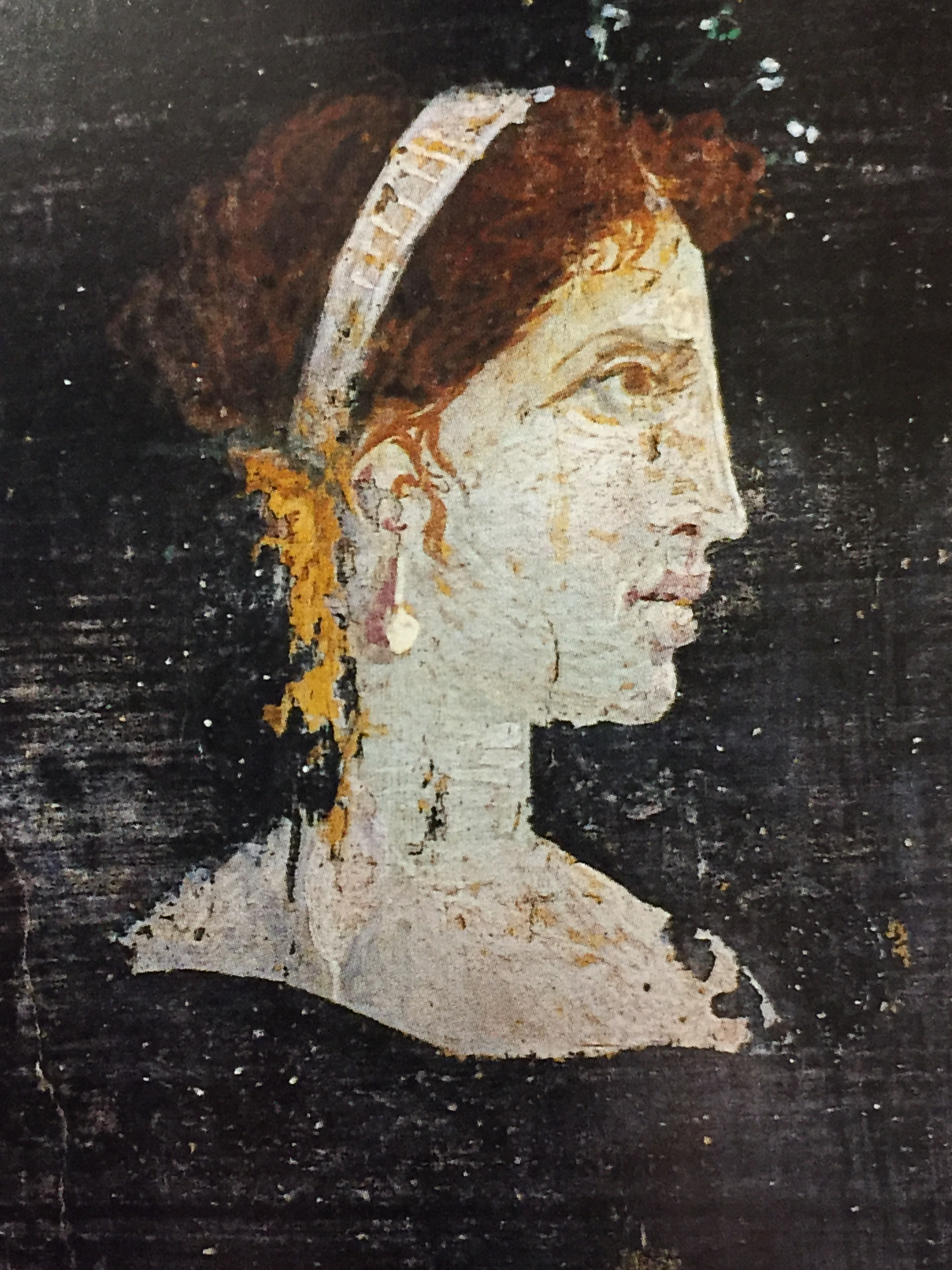
Most likely a posthumous painted portrait of Cleopatra VII of Ptolemaic Egypt with red hair and her distinct facial features, wearing a royal diadem and pearl-studded hairpins, from Roman Herculaneum, mid-1st century AD

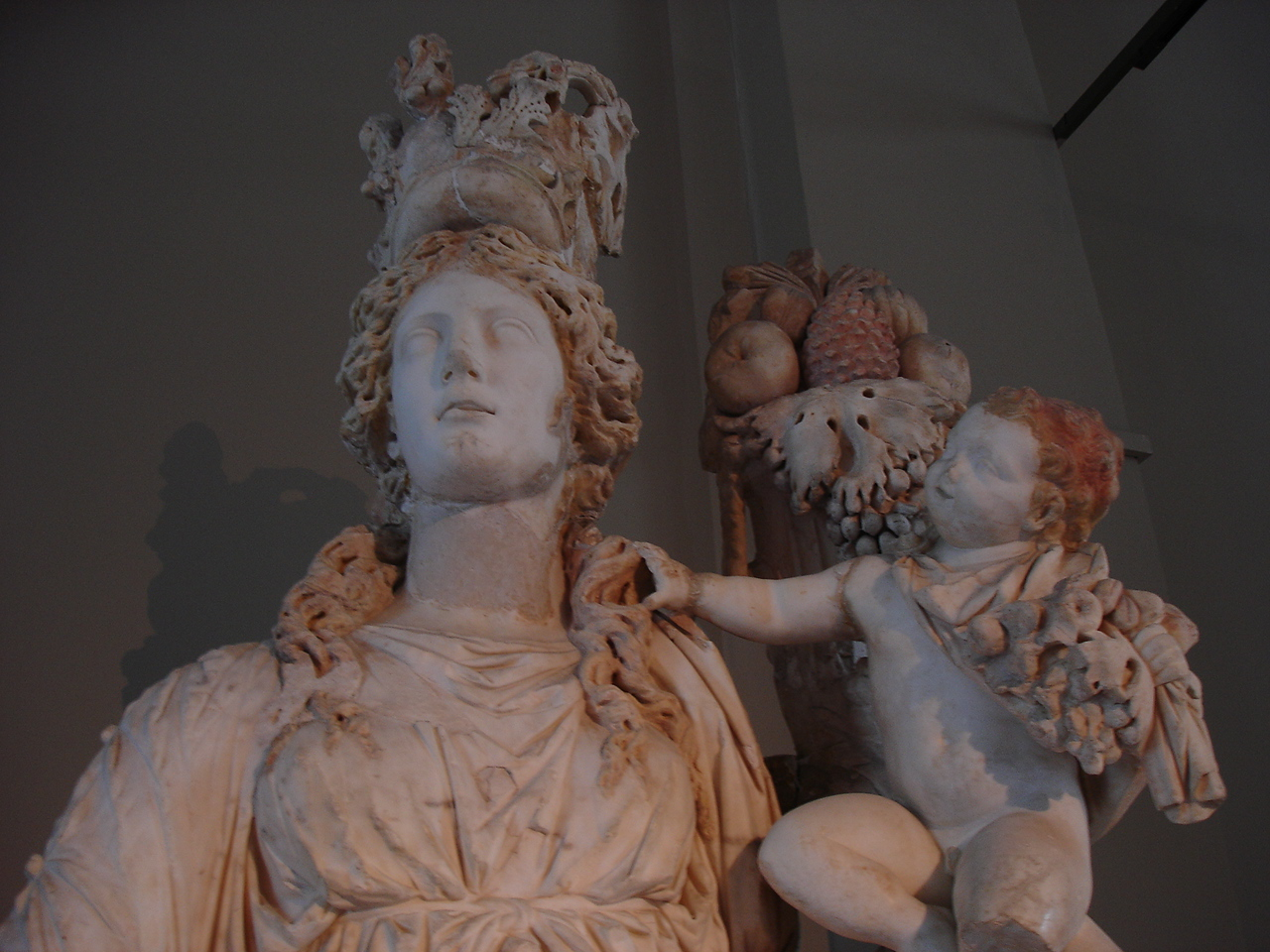
Polychrome Roman marble statue depicting the goddess Tyche holding the infant Plutus in her arms, 2nd century, Istanbul Archaeological Museum

In various times and cultures, red hair has been prized, feared, and ridiculed.

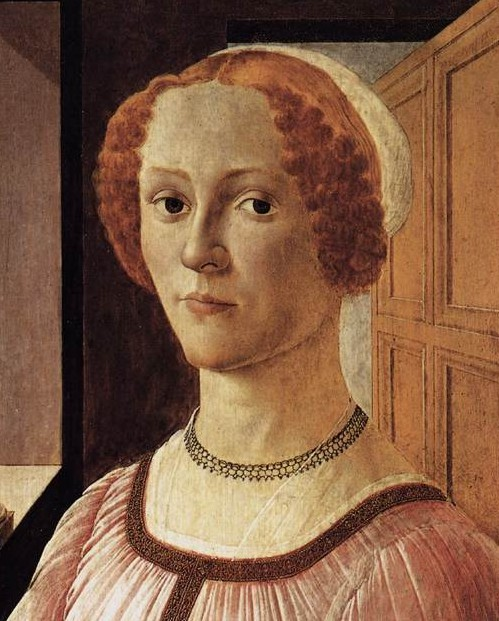
Portrait of a Lady, c. 1470–1475, by Sandro Botticelli

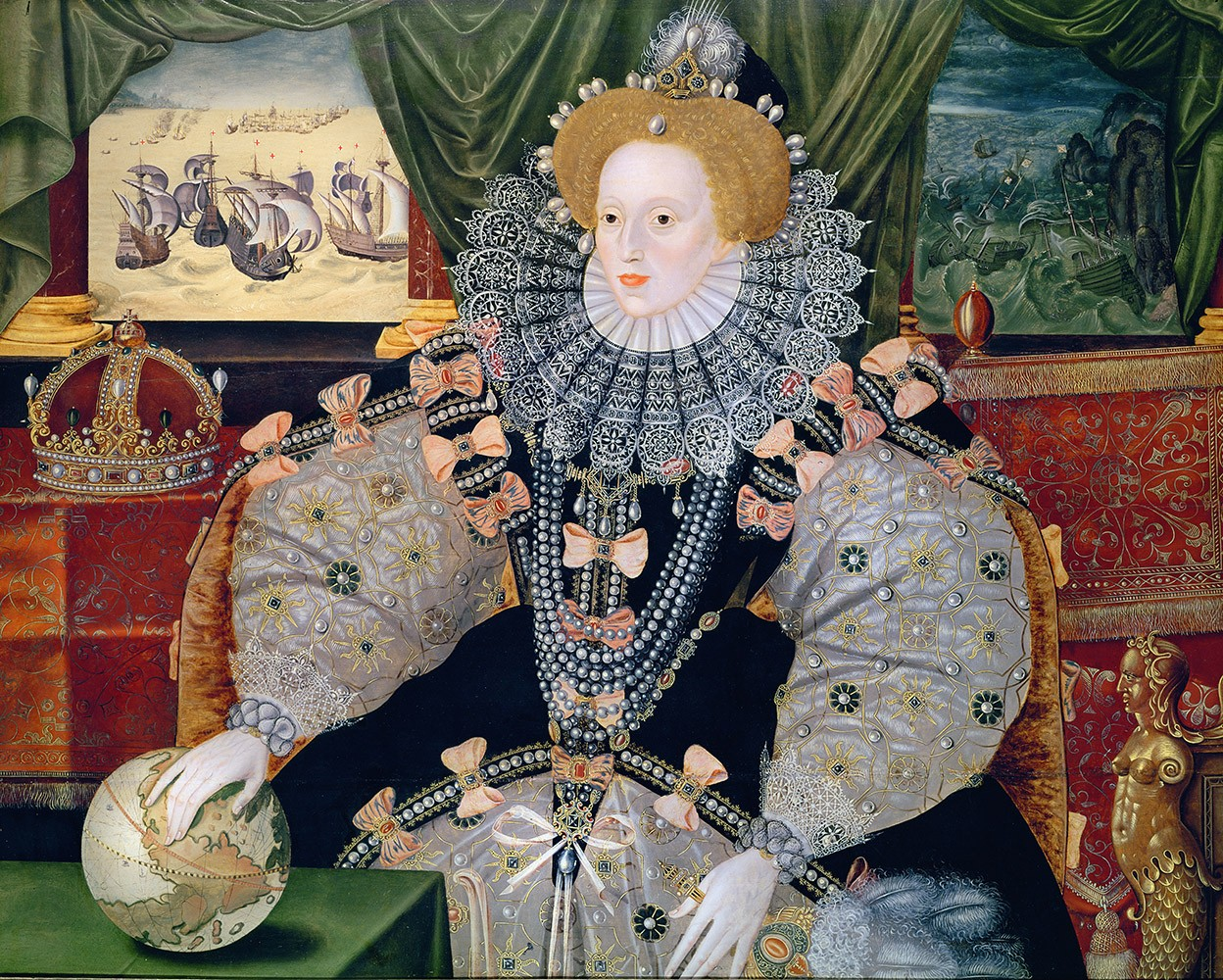
Elizabeth I of England, c. 1588

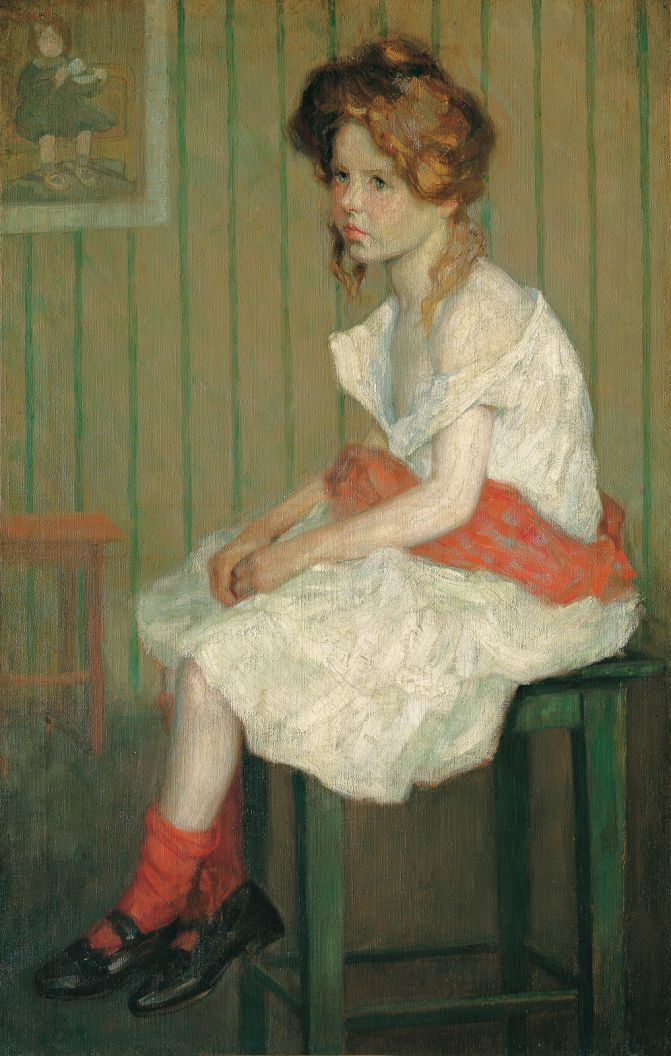
Portrait of a Girl with Red Hair (c.1912) by Slovenian artist Henrika Šantel

=== Media, fashion and art ===
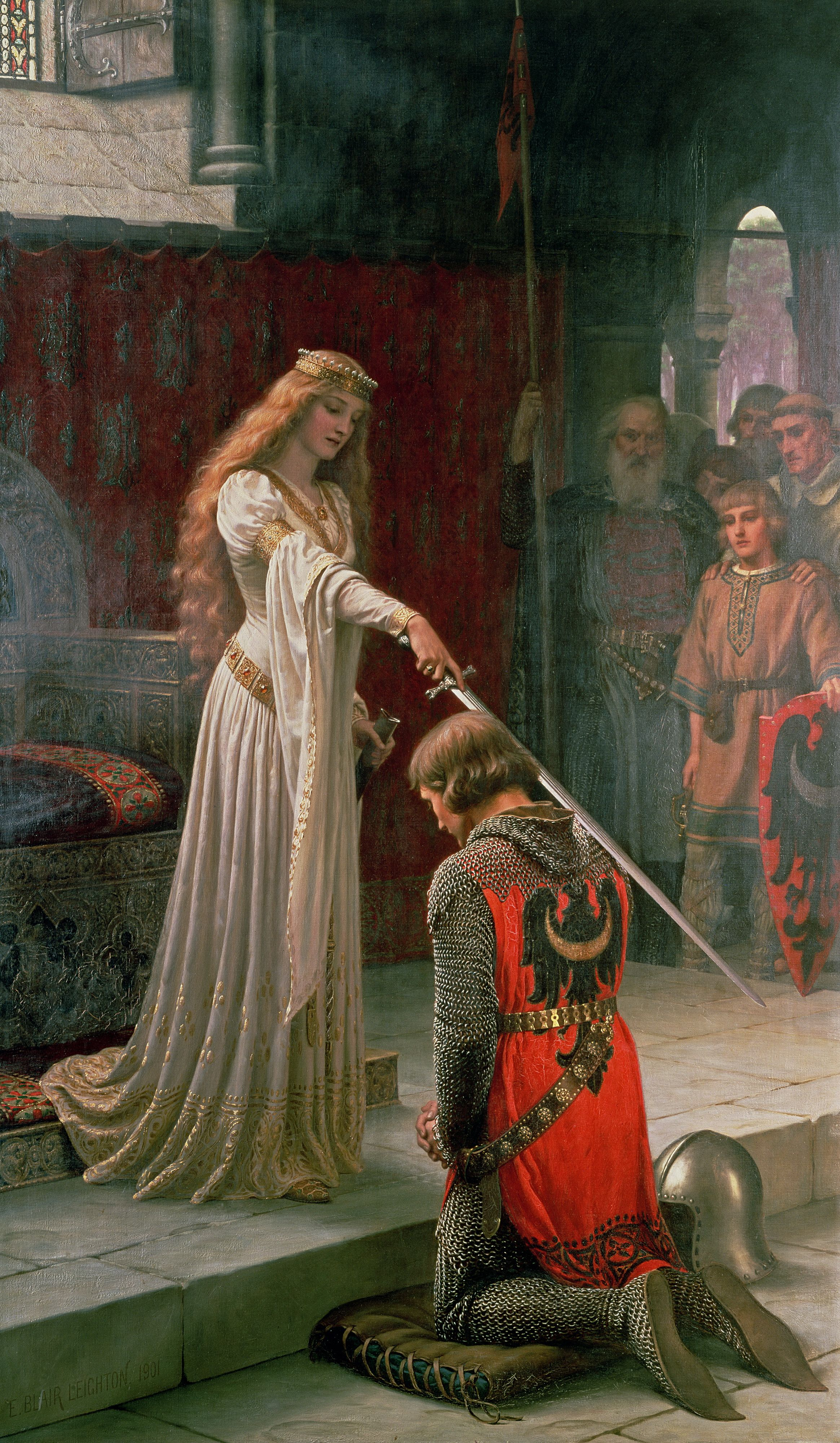
The Accolade, 1901, by Edmund Blair Leighton

Queen Elizabeth I of England was a redhead, and during the Elizabethan era in England, red hair was fashionable for women. In modern times, red hair is subject to fashion trends; celebrities such as Nicole Kidman, Alyson Hannigan, Marcia Cross, Christina Hendricks, Emma Stone and Geri Halliwell can boost sales of red hair dye.

Sometimes, red hair darkens as people get older, becoming a more brownish color or losing some of its vividness. This leads some to associate red hair with youthfulness, a quality that is generally considered desirable. In several countries such as India, Iran, Bangladesh and Pakistan, henna and saffron are used on hair to give it a bright red appearance.

Many painters have exhibited a fascination with red hair. The hair color "Titian" takes its name from the artist Titian, who often painted women with red hair. Early Renaissance artist Sandro Botticelli's famous painting The Birth of Venus depicts the mythological goddess Venus as a redhead. Other painters notable for their redheads include the Pre-Raphaelites, Edmund Leighton, Modigliani, and Gustav Klimt.

Sir Arthur Conan Doyle's Sherlock Holmes story "The Red-Headed League" (1891) involves a man who is asked to become a member of a mysterious group of red-headed people. The 1943 film DuBarry Was a Lady featured red-heads Lucille Ball and Red Skelton in Technicolor.

Notable comic book characters with red hair include Jean Grey, Red Sonja, Mystique, and Poison Ivy.

A book of photographs of red haired people was published in 2020, Gingers by Kieran Dodds (2020).

=== Red hair festivals ===
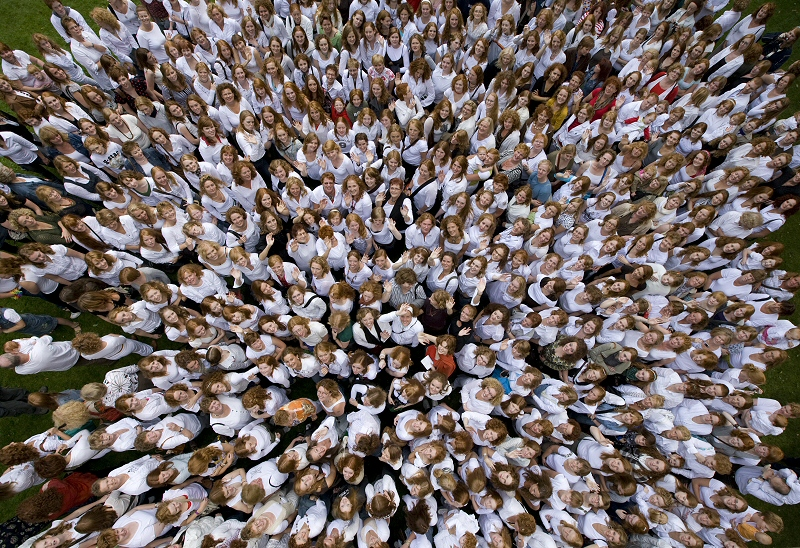
Hundreds of redheads together at the Redhead Day, September 2007

There has been an annual Redhead Day festival in the Netherlands that attracts red-haired participants from around the world. The festival was held in Breda, a city in the south east of the Netherlands, prior to 2019, when it moved to Tilburg. It attracts participants from over 80 countries. The international event began in 2005, when Dutch painter Bart Rouwenhorst decided he wanted to paint 15 redheads.

The Irish Redhead Convention, held in late August in County Cork since 2011, claims to be a global celebration and attracts people from several continents. The celebrations include crowning the ginger King and Queen, competitions for the best red eyebrows and most freckles per square inch, orchestral concerts and carrot throwing competitions.

A smaller red-hair day festival is held since 2013 by the UK's Anti-Bullying Alliance in London, with the aim of instilling pride in having red-hair.

Since 2014, a red-hair event is held in Israel, at Kibbutz Gezer (Carrot), for the local Israeli red hair community, including both Ashkenazi and Mizrahi red-heads. However, the number of attendees has to be restricted due to the risk of rocket attacks, leading to anger in the red-hair community. The organizers state; "The event is a good thing for many redheads, who had been embarrassed about being redheads before."

The first and only festival for red heads in the United States was launched in 2015. Held in Highwood, Illinois, Redhead Days draws participants from across the United States.

A festival to celebrate the red-haired people is held annually in Izhevsk (Russia), the capital of Udmurtia, since 2004.

MC1R Magazine is a publication for red-haired people worldwide, based in Hamburg, Germany.

=== Religious and mythological traditions ===
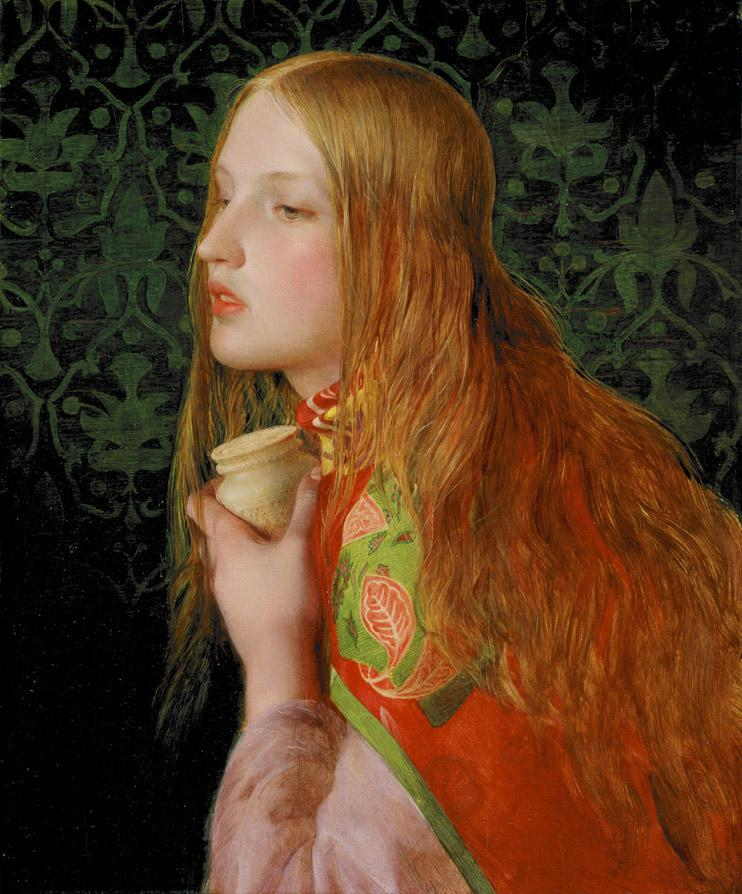
Mary Magdalene is commonly portrayed with long red hair, as in this 1859 painting by Anthony Frederick Augustus Sandys.

In ancient Egypt, red hair was associated with the deity Set, as well as Ramesses II.

The Norse god Thor is usually described as having a reddish beard.

The Masoretic text uses the word admoni, usually translated "ruddy" or "reddish-brown" (admoni אדמוני, from the root ADM אדם, see also Adam and Edom) which was used to describe both Esau and David. Josephus on the other hand described only Esau as red haired, with David being described as golden haired.

Judas Iscariot is also represented with red hair in Spanish culture and in the works of William Shakespeare, reinforcing the negative stereotype.

=== The name "Rory" ===
The mainly masculine given name Rory – a name of Goidelic origin, which is an anglicisation of the Irish: Ruairí/Ruaidhrí/Ruaidhrígh/Raidhrígh, Scottish Gaelic: Ruairidh and Manx: Rauree which is common to the Irish, Highland Scots and their diasporas – means "red-haired king", from ruadh ("red-haired" or "rusty") and rígh ("king"). However, present bearers of the name are by no means all red-haired themselves.

== Prejudice and discrimination against redheads ==
=== Assumptions concerning temperament ===
A common assumption about redheads is that they have fiery tempers and sharp tongues. In Anne of Green Gables, a character says of Anne Shirley, the redheaded heroine, that "her temper matches her hair", while in The Catcher in the Rye, Holden Caulfield remarks that "People with red hair are supposed to get mad very easily, but Allie [his dead brother] never did, and he had very red hair."

During the early stages of modern medicine, red hair was thought to be a sign of a sanguine temperament. In the Indian medicinal practice of Ayurveda, redheads are seen as most likely to have a Pitta temperament.

Another assumption is that redheads are highly sexed; for example, Jonathan Swift satirizes redhead stereotypes in part four of Gulliver's Travels, "A Voyage to the Country of the Houyhnhnms," when he writes that: "It is observed that the red-haired of both sexes are more libidinous and mischievous than the rest, whom yet they much exceed in strength and activity." Swift goes on to write that "neither was the hair of this brute [a Yahoo] of a red colour (which might have been some excuse for an appetite a little irregular) but black as a sloe". Such assumptions were given a veneer of scientific credibility in the 19th century by Cesare Lombroso and Guglielmo Ferrero. They concluded that red hair was associated with crimes of lust, and claimed that 48% of "criminal women" were redheads.

==== Medieval thought ====
Theophilus Presbyter describes how the blood of a red-haired young man is necessary to create gold from copper, in a mixture with the ashes of a basilisk.

According to Montague Summers, red hair and green eyes were thought to be the sign of a witch, werewolf or vampire during the Middle Ages:

Those whose hair is red, of a certain peculiar shade, are unmistakably vampires. It is significant that in ancient Egypt, as Manetho tells us, human sacrifices were offered at the grave of Osiris, and the victims were red-haired men who were burned, their ashes being scattered far and wide by winnowing-fans. It is held by some authorities that this was done to fertilize the fields and produce a bounteous harvest, red-hair symbolizing the golden wealth of the corn. But these men were called Typhonians, and were representatives not of Osiris but of his evil rival Typhon, whose hair was red.

==== Antisemitism ====
During the Spanish Inquisition, people of red hair were identified as Jewish and isolated for persecution. In medieval Italy and Spain, red hair was associated with the heretical nature of Jews and their rejection of Jesus, and thus Judas Iscariot was commonly depicted as red-haired in European art. The medieval prejudice against red-hair may have derived partially from the ancient biblical tradition, in relation to biblical figures such as Esau and King David. The ancient historian Josephus would translate the Old Testament to describe the more positive figure of King David as 'golden haired', in contrast to the negative figure of Esau as red haired. Red hair remained a conventional marker of Jewish villainy in later English theatre and literature: Shylock, in Shakespeare's The Merchant of Venice, was traditionally performed in a red wig, even though the play's text does not mention his hair, and Charles Dickens introduced the villainous Fagin in Oliver Twist with "matted red hair". The antisemitic association persisted into modern times in Soviet Russia.

==== Modern-day discrimination ====
In his 1885 book I Say No, Wilkie Collins wrote "The prejudice against habitual silence, among the lower order of the people, is almost as inveterate as the prejudice against red hair."

In his 1895 memoir and history The Gurneys of Earlham, Augustus John Cuthbert Hare described an incident of harassment: "The second son, John, was born in 1750. As a boy he had bright red hair, and it is amusingly recorded that one day in the streets of Norwich a number of boys followed him, pointing to his red locks and saying, "Look at that boy; he's got a bonfire on the top of his head," and that John Gurney was so disgusted that he went to a barber's, had his head shaved, and went home in a wig. He grew up, however, a remarkably attractive-looking young man."

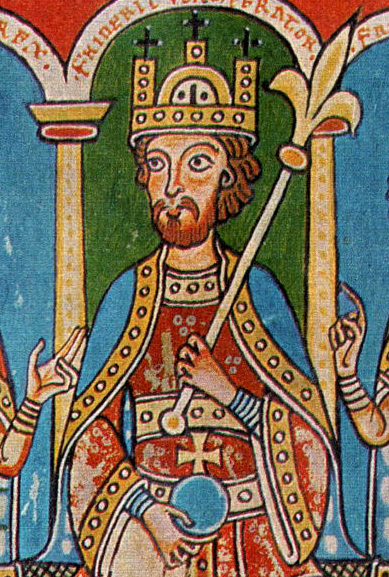
Painting of Frederick Barbarossa, Holy Roman Emperor from 1155 to 1190, from the Historia Welforum

In British English, the word "ginger" is sometimes used to describe red-headed people (at times in an insulting manner), with terms such as "gingerphobia" and "gingerism" used by the British media. It is roughly the color of dried, powdered ginger root. In Britain, redheads are also sometimes referred to disparagingly as "carrot tops" and "carrot heads" (the comedian "Carrot Top" uses this stage name). "Gingerism" has been compared to racism, although this is widely disputed, and bodies such as the UK Commission for Racial Equality do not monitor cases of discrimination and hate crimes against redheads.

Nonetheless, individuals and families in Britain are targeted for harassment and violence because of their hair colour. In 2003, a 20-year-old was stabbed in the back for "being ginger". In 2007, a UK woman won an award from a tribunal after being sexually harassed and receiving abuse because of her red hair; in the same year, a family in Newcastle upon Tyne, was forced to move twice after being targeted for abuse and hate crimes on account of their red hair. In May 2009, a schoolboy committed suicide after being bullied for having red hair. In 2013, a fourteen-year-old boy in Lincoln had his right arm broken and his head stamped on by three men who attacked him "just because he had red hair"; the three men were subsequently jailed for a combined total of ten years and one month for the attack. This prejudice has been satirised on a number of TV shows. English comedian Catherine Tate (herself a redhead) appeared as a red-haired character in a running sketch of her series The Catherine Tate Show. The sketch saw fictional character Sandra Kemp, who was forced to seek solace in a refuge for ginger people because she had been ostracised from society. The British comedy Bo' Selecta! (starring redhead Leigh Francis) featured a spoof documentary which involved a caricature of Mick Hucknall presenting a show in which celebrities (played by themselves) dyed their hair red for a day and went about daily life being insulted by people; Hucknall, who says that he has repeatedly faced prejudice or been described as ugly on account of his hair colour, argues that Gingerism should be described as a form of racism. Comedian Tim Minchin, himself a redhead, also covered the topic in his song "Prejudice".

The pejorative use of the word "ginger" and related discrimination was used to illustrate a point about racism and prejudice in the "Ginger Kids", "Le Petit Tourette", "It's a Jersey Thing" and "Fatbeard" episodes of South Park.

Film and television programmes often portray school bullies as having red hair. However, children with red hair are often themselves targeted by bullies; "Somebody with ginger hair will stand out from the crowd," says anti-bullying expert Louise Burfitt-Dons.

In Australian slang, redheads are often nicknamed "Blue" or "Bluey". More recently, they have been referred to as "rangas" (a word derived from the red-haired ape, the orangutan), sometimes with derogatory connotations. The word "rufus" (a variant of rufous, a reddish-brown color) has been used in both Australian and British slang to refer to red-headed people.

In November 2008, social networking website Facebook received criticism after a "Kick a Ginger" group, which aimed to establish a "National Kick a Ginger Day" on 20 November, acquired almost 5,000 members. A 14-year-old boy from Vancouver who ran the Facebook group was subjected to an investigation by the Royal Canadian Mounted Police for possible hate crimes.

In December 2009 British supermarket chain Tesco withdrew a Christmas card which had the image of a child with red hair sitting on the lap of Father Christmas, and the words: "Santa loves all kids. Even ginger ones" after customers complained the card was offensive.

In October 2010, Harriet Harman, the former Equality Minister in the British government under Labour, faced accusations of prejudice after she described the red-haired Treasury secretary Danny Alexander as a "ginger rodent". Alexander responded to the insult by stating that he was "proud to be ginger". Harman was subsequently forced to apologise for the comment, after facing criticism for prejudice against a minority group.

In September 2011, Cryos International, one of the world's largest sperm banks, announced that it would no longer accept donations from red-haired men due to low demand from women seeking artificial insemination.

==== Use of term in Singapore and Malaysia ====
The term ang mo (Chinese: 红毛; pinyin: hóng máo; Pe̍h-ōe-jī: âng-mo͘) in Hokkien (Min Nan) Chinese, meaning "red-haired", is used in Malaysia and Singapore, although it refers to all white people, never exclusively people with red hair. The epithet is sometimes rendered as ang mo kui (红毛鬼) meaning "red-haired devil", similar to the Cantonese term gweilo ("foreign devil"). Thus it is viewed as racist and derogatory by some people. Others, however, maintain it is acceptable. Despite this ambiguity, it is a widely used term. It appears, for instance, in Singaporean newspapers such as The Straits Times, and in television programmes and films.

The historic fortress Fort Santo Domingo in Tamsui, Taiwan was nicknamed in Taiwanese Hokkien Chinese: 紅毛城; Pe̍h-ōe-jī: Âng-mn̂g-siâⁿ; lit. 'Red-hair (ang mo) fort'.

== See also ==
- Blond hair
- Black hair
- Brown hair
- Erythrism – in non-human animals
- How to be a Redhead
