= Cryos International =

Sperm bank in Aarhus

- Type: Privately held company
- Industry: Sperm and egg banking
- Founded: 1987
- Founder: Ole Schou
- Headquarters: Aarhus, Denmark
- Area served: Worldwide
- Services: Donor sperm; donor eggs; cryopreservation; fertility services
- Website: www.cryosinternational.com

Cryos International is a sperm and egg bank in Aarhus, Denmark. Based on the number of available donors, Cryos International was the largest sperm and egg bank in the world as of September 2025. It was founded in 1987 by Ole Schou. The bank has outposts in Florida, North Carolina, and Texas in the United States as well as fertility clinics in Denmark and Cyprus. The bank delivers to more than 100 countries. Lesbian couples and single women made up 85% of clients as of September 2025 and sperm prices varied between €40 ($48) and €1,600.

== Controversy ==
In 2021, Cryos International was the subject of scrutiny following reports from the New York Times of lax international regulations on sperm donation. Dutch serial sperm donor Jonathan Jacob Meijer, accused of having between 500 and 600 children, was registered with Cryos, which does not set limits on the number of children per donor. In 2019, Cryos International informed a German woman who conceived a child using Meijer's sperm that he had "donated in countries outside of Denmark, therefore breaching the contract he had with Cryos to donate exclusively to our sperm bank".
