= Natalie Hill =

British television executive

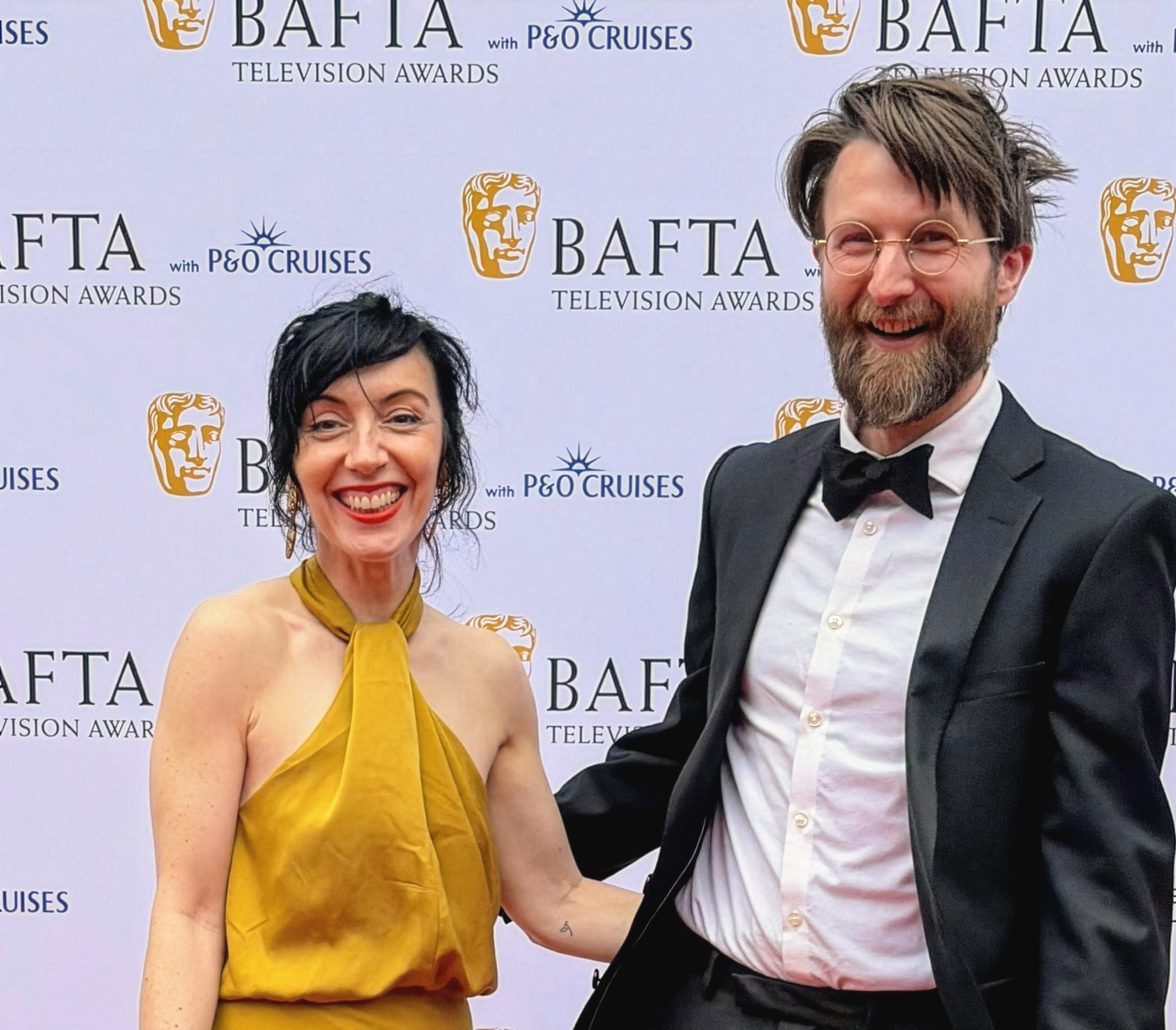
- Hill (left) with Theatreship director Inigo Lapwood at the 2026 BAFTA Television Awards
- Born: Birmingham, England
- Education: University of Oxford
- Occupations: Television executive producer, documentary director, and film programmer
- Years active: 2001–present
- Known for: The Man with 1000 Kids; Unprecedented; 24 Hours in A&E; The Apprentice (British TV series)
- Title: Head of Film Programming at Theatreship

Natalie Hill is a multi-BAFTA award-winning British television executive producer, documentary director, and film programmer specializing in factual television and issue-driven documentaries. She currently serves as the head of film programming at Theatreship, a floating arts venue in London.

== Career ==
Raised on a council estate in Birmingham, England, Hill studied law at Oxford University before shifting to a career in television. Over a 25-year career in factual broadcasting, she has produced and directed several prominent British reality and documentary series, including 24 Hours in A&E, Great British Menu, and The Apprentice.

Earlier in her career, she worked as a development executive at Mentorn before joining the Glasgow-based indie Hello Halo as head of development in 2016. She later served as Creative Director for AJH Films and joined Alex Holder's Rogo Productions as an executive in 2020.

She developed the Grierson-shortlisted and BAFTA Scotland-nominated BBC One documentary Fashion's Dirty Secrets. In 2024, Hill executive-produced the global Netflix documentary series The Man with 1000 Kids, tracking the actions of Dutch serial sperm donor Jonathan Meijer. She discussed her two-year development process for the series as a featured guest on the Netflix podcast You Can't Make This Up.

In addition to her television work, Hill serves as head of film programming at Theatreship in Canary Wharf, London, where she has curated cinema seasons in partnership with the British Film Institute (BFI).

== Selected Filmography ==
- The Man with 1000 Kids (Netflix, 2024) – Executive Producer
- Unprecedented (Discovery+, 2022) – Creative Director
- Bad Boy Chiller Crew (ITV) – Executive Producer (Series shortlisted for a Grierson Award)
- The Dog Fixers (Channel 4) – Executive Producer
- River Hunters (Sky History) – Producer
- Fashion's Dirty Secrets (BBC One) – Developer / Producer (Nominated for a BAFTA Scotland Award; Grierson-shortlisted)
- Great British Menu (BBC Two) – Producer (Series nominated for BAFTA TV Awards)
- Stacey Dooley Investigates (BBC) – Producer / Director (Series won One World Media Awards)
- 24 Hours in A&E (Channel 4) – Producer / Director (Series won RTS Award for Best Documentary Series and received BAFTA TV Award nominations)
- The Apprentice (BBC) – Series Producer (Series won multiple BAFTA TV Awards)
- Young Apprentice (BBC) – Series Producer (won 2012 Reality and Constructed Factual BAFTA)
- Large (Film Four, 2001) – Production Team
