= Mynkivtsi =

Mynkivtsi may refer to the following places in Ukraine:

- Mynkivtsi — Kyiv Oblast, Bila Tserkva Raion
- Mynkivtsi — Rivne Oblast, Dubno Raion
- Mynkivtsi — Khmelnytskyi Oblast, Kamianets-Podilskyi Raion
- Mynkivtsi — Khmelnytskyi Oblast, Shepetivka Raion
