= SloMo (disambiguation) =

SloMo may refer to:

- Slow motion
- "SloMo" (Chanel song), 2021
- "SloMo" (San Cisco song), 2016
- "Slomo", a 2017 song by Slowdive from Slowdive
- Slow Mo, nickname of basketballer Kyle Anderson

== See also ==
- Slomó Köves, a Hungarian Orthodox rabbi
