= Unprecedented =

Unprecedented may refer to:

- Unprecedented (Jing Chang album), 2009
- Unprecedented (Marcela Bovio album), 2016
- Unprecedented: The 2000 Presidential Election, a 2002 documentary film
- Unprecedented (TV series), a 2020 UK television drama series in response to lockdown
- Unprecedented (miniseries), a documentary series by Alex Holder about the last months of the presidency of Donald Trump
