= National Historic Ships UK =

British non-departmental public body

Registered Vessels

Member of the National Historic Fleet

Ensigns of the National Register of Historic Vessels

National Historic Ships UK is a government-funded independent organisation that advises UK governments and others on matters relating to historic ships. It is sponsored by the Headley Trust, the National Lottery Heritage Fund and the Department for Digital, Culture, Media and Sport.

== Background ==
National Historic Ships UK is the successor of the Advisory Committee on National Historic Ships, which was established in 2006 as non-departmental public body reporting to the Department for Culture, Media and Sport with a specific remit to advise the Secretary of State and other public bodies on ship preservation and funding priorities.

The Advisory Committee on National Historic Ships, in turn, was the successor to the National Historic Ships Committee, which emerged from a seminar held in 1991 to discuss the problems facing the preservation of historic ships and vessels in the UK and the evident neglect of this important part of British heritage. Strong support was expressed for the creation of a co-ordinating body that could provide an overview of all aspects of historic ship preservation and the Committee was formally launched on 15 July 1992 by Lord Lewin, then Chairman of Trustees of the National Maritime Museum.

National Historic Ships UK carries a wider remit than its predecessor body, looking not only at the immediate issues concerning historic vessels in the UK, but also addressing questions relating to the support infrastructure for historic ships, their potential for contributing in the wider economic, social and community context, and by maintaining a watch list of vessels abroad with potential UK significance. As well as providing formal advice to funding bodies, it also gives direct assistance to vessel owners, for example through its small grants scheme and its directory of relevant skills and services.

== Governance ==
National Historic Ships UK operates as an executive arm's-length body, receiving its core funding through a grant-in-aid from the Department for Culture, Media and Sport (DCMS). While it maintains statutory independence in its advisory capacity, it is administratively hosted by Royal Museums Greenwich, which provides office space and archival support at the National Maritime Museum site.

=== Leadership ===
The organization is led by a Director who acts as the primary source of advice to the government on maritime heritage policy.

- Director: Hannah Cunliffe (appointed 2017)

=== Council of Experts ===
The Director is supported by a Council of Experts, comprising up to 12 specialists from the maritime and heritage sectors who have demonstrated exceptional conservation, technical, business management, governance or strategic planning skills. Members are appointed by a Nominations Panel and advise on key issues affecting National Historic Ships UK and the constituencies that it serves. The Council provides technical advice on vessel conservation and oversees the selection of vessels for the National Historic Fleet.

Notable current members of the Council include:

- Andrew Baines: Executive Director of Museum Operations at the National Museum of the Royal Navy.
- Stephen Beresford: Boat conservator at Windermere Jetty: Museum of Boats, Steam and Stories.
- Ian Clark: Icon-accredited conservation engineer.
- Wyn Davies: Naval architect and maritime heritage specialist.
- Linda Fitzpatrick: Head Curator of the Scottish Fisheries Museum.
- Paul Jeffery: Maritime heritage advisor at Historic England.
- Eric Kentley: Former curator at the National Maritime Museum and maritime consultant.
- Inigo Lapwood: Director of the Theatreship and Artship heritage projects.

== The National Register of Historic Vessels and National Archive of Historic Vessels ==
The National Register of Historic Vessels (NRHV) is a database that lists vessels that are:

- At least 50 years old
- Demonstrably and significantly associated with the UK
- Based in UK waters
- More than 33 ft (10.07 metres) in length overall (length OA) measured between the forward and aft extremities of the hull overall excluding any spars or projections.
- Substantially intact

Inclusion on the Register is with the owner's consent. The records include details of designer, builder, dimensions, construction, propulsion, service history and current location, as well as images of many of the vessels.

The National Register of Historic Vessels contains a sub-group of some 200 vessels that comprise The National Historic Fleet. These vessels are distinguished by:

- Being of pre-eminent national or regional significance
- Spanning the spectrum of UK maritime history
- Illustrating changes in construction and technology
- Meriting a higher priority for long term preservation

The National Historic Fleet may also include vessels from the National Small Ships Register that are a minimum of 50 years and fit the above criteria.

The National Archive of Historic Vessels includes details of vessels no longer on the NRHV because they have been scrapped, lost, or moved abroad. It also includes vessels that do not meet all the criteria for inclusion on the NRHV but are nevertheless of historic interest.

There are currently over 1500 vessels on the National Register of Historic Vessels and over 400 vessels on the National Archive of Historic Vessels. The registers provide an authoritative assessment of the significance of historic vessels. The database can also be used to identify and prioritise vessels that should be preserved, provide guidance to decision-makers on the allocation of funding, and give an early warning of ships 'at risk'. The database can also be a useful research tool, although confidential information about ownership etc. is always kept secure.

Over 57% of historic vessels recorded on the National Register of Historic Vessels are either privately owned or commercially operated. Museums and charitable trusts account for 14% of the total.

Fully searchable versions of the databases (excluding ownership information) are available on National Historic Ships' website.

== See also ==
- Barcelona Charter
- List of museum ships
- National Historic Fleet
