= Philip Wodianer =

Phillip Wodianer was a Hungarian communal worker; he lived at Szeged during the latter part of the 18th and the beginning of the 19th century. He was president of the Jewish community there from 1793 to 1809, and presented the congregation with the site for its first synagogue, and with silver holy vessels for its ḥebra ḳaddisha.

His son Cosman (b. Veprovac 1788; d. at Győr-Sziget, August 18, 1831) studied Talmud under Samuel C. Brody and Lebusch Ḥarif in Szeged, under R. Moses Sofer in Mattersdorf, and under R. Moses Minz in Óbuda. In Győr-Sziget, where he settled after his marriage, he maintained a yeshibah of his own, which was usually frequented by forty to fifty pupils; and he enjoyed a high reputation as a Talmudist. His writings, left in manuscript, were published by his son Arnold (born in Győr, 1817) under the editorship of Prof. W. Bacher. They appeared in 1890 in two volumes entitled Sefer Naḥalat Yehoshua, Liber Hereditatis Josuæ, Commentationes in Plerosque Talmudi Babylonii Tractatus Additis Commentationibus in Pentateuchum, and consisted of Talmudic novellae and of explanations of passages in the Torah.

Wodianer's son Samuel, who, after the death of his father, kept a large warehouse in Szeged for tobacco, wool, and grain, was president of the community from 1812 to 1821. Later he settled in Pest (a part of Budapest), where he and his children were baptized. His son Albert (born at Szeged August 13, 1818; died in Budapest July 17, 1898) studied technology in Pest and Vienna, and was in 1867 appointed royal commissary of the Hungarian Northern Railroad. In 1869 he received the Iron Cross of the second class, and in 1870 the cross of the papal Order of St. George; and in 1886 he was elevated to the Hungarian nobility.
