= Alex Holder =

British documentary filmmaker

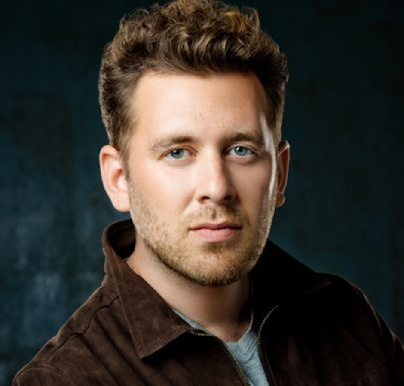
- Occupation: Director
- Years active: 2016–present
- Known for: Documentaries
- Notable work: Unprecedented
- Website: ajhfilms.com

Alex Holder is a British documentary filmmaker, founder and managing director of AJH Films.

== Life and career ==
Before Unprecedented Holder describes himself as a previously "pretty unknown quantity", but he was a producer on the 2016 Tribeca film Keep Quiet. It is a 2016 documentary about an anti-Semitic politician (Csanád Szegedi, a co-founder of the far-right Hungarian political party Jobbik) who finds out he’s Jewish.

His works also include Bad Boy Chiller Crew, a 2021 series about Bad Boy Chiller Crew, an English bassline collective from Bradford.

=== Unprecedented ===
Holder spent two years working on a documentary film about Donald Trump’s 2020 re-election campaign and the aftermath. The film premiered on July 10, 2022, on Discovery+. The three-part series features interviews with the former president; his children Ivanka, Eric, and Don Jr.; Jared Kushner and former Vice President Mike Pence; as well as footage shot at the Capitol on January 6. The filmmakers have stated that the delay of the film's release was not intentional, but due to the needs of production. According to Holder, the Trumps didn’t have editorial control over the documentary.

Holder was subpoenaed by the Jan 6 Committee to hand over raw footage he possessed from filming Unprecedented, in the final months of 2020 and early 2021. The Jan 6 Committee were specifically interested in "raw footage taken on 6th January 2021; raw footage of interviews with President Donald J. Trump, Donald J. Trump, Jr., Ivanka Trump, Eric Trump, Jared Kushner; and Vice President Mike Pence; raw footage pertaining to discussions of election fraud or election integrity surrounding the November 2020 presidential election". Holder captured Ivanka Trump on camera, contradicting herself (and thus lying to documentary cameras or a Senate committee under oath). In December 2020, days after Attorney General William P. Barr's announcement, Ivanka publicly supported Donald Trump's fight to overturn the election results. In her testimony, however, she agreed with Barr's claim that the election was legitimate.

Holder captured a moment when Mike Pence read an email confirming that his letter rejecting Nancy Pelosi's attempt to invoke the 25th Amendment had been sent. While the documentary suggested Pence was reacting to a House resolution urging him to remove Trump, his spokesman disputed this characterization, clarifying that Pence was merely acknowledging his own letter.

Holder testified in a closed-door deposition before the Committee on 23 June 2022.

Holder has been accused of being a British or US spy and got a security detail, appeared on CNN and MSNBC. He has been ordered to give evidence to an investigation in Georgia, too, which is looking at whether Trump pressured state officials to influence the 2020 election in the state.

Some of "the most intriguing material associated with Unprecedented" didn’t make it into the film, however it was included in the January 6 committee's request for footage.

=== Ongoing projects ===
His next documentary is on the Israeli–Palestinian conflict. Among those who will take part in the film are Noam Chomsky, Nickolay Mladenov, and Tony Blair.

== Filmography ==
Year	Film	Type	Credits	Runtime
2024	The Man with 1000 Kids	Documentary, 3 episodes	Executive producer	3 x 45 mins
2022	Unprecedented	Documentary, 3 episodes	Director	2 hours 28 minutes
2021	Bad Boy Chiller Crew	Documentary, 6 episodes	Executive producer	6 x 45 minutes
2016	Keep Quiet	Documentary	Producer	1 hour 30 minutes

== Awards ==
Year	Award	Film	Status	Note
2017	Cinema for Peace Awards	Keep Quiet	Winner	Most Valuable Documentary of the Year
2017	Copenhagen International Documentary Film Festival	Keep Quiet	Nominee	ACT Award
2016	Tribeca Film Festival	Keep Quiet	Nominee	Best Documentary Feature
