= Moses Münz =

Mid-18th century to mid-19th century Hungarian rabbi

- Portrait of Moses Münz

Personal life
- Born: c. 1750 Minkowitz, Podolia
- Died: 15 August 1831 Alt-Ofen (Óbuda), Hungary, Austrian Empire
- Buried: Óbuda Jewish Cemetery

Religious life
- Religion: Judaism
- Denomination: Orthodox Judaism

Jewish leader
- Yahrtzeit: 6 Elul 5591

Moses Münz (Hebrew: משה מינץ, romanized: Mosheh Mints; c. 1750 – 15 August 1831) was a Hungarian rabbi. He served as chief rabbi of Alt-Ofen (Óbuda) from 1790 until his death.

== Early life and education ==
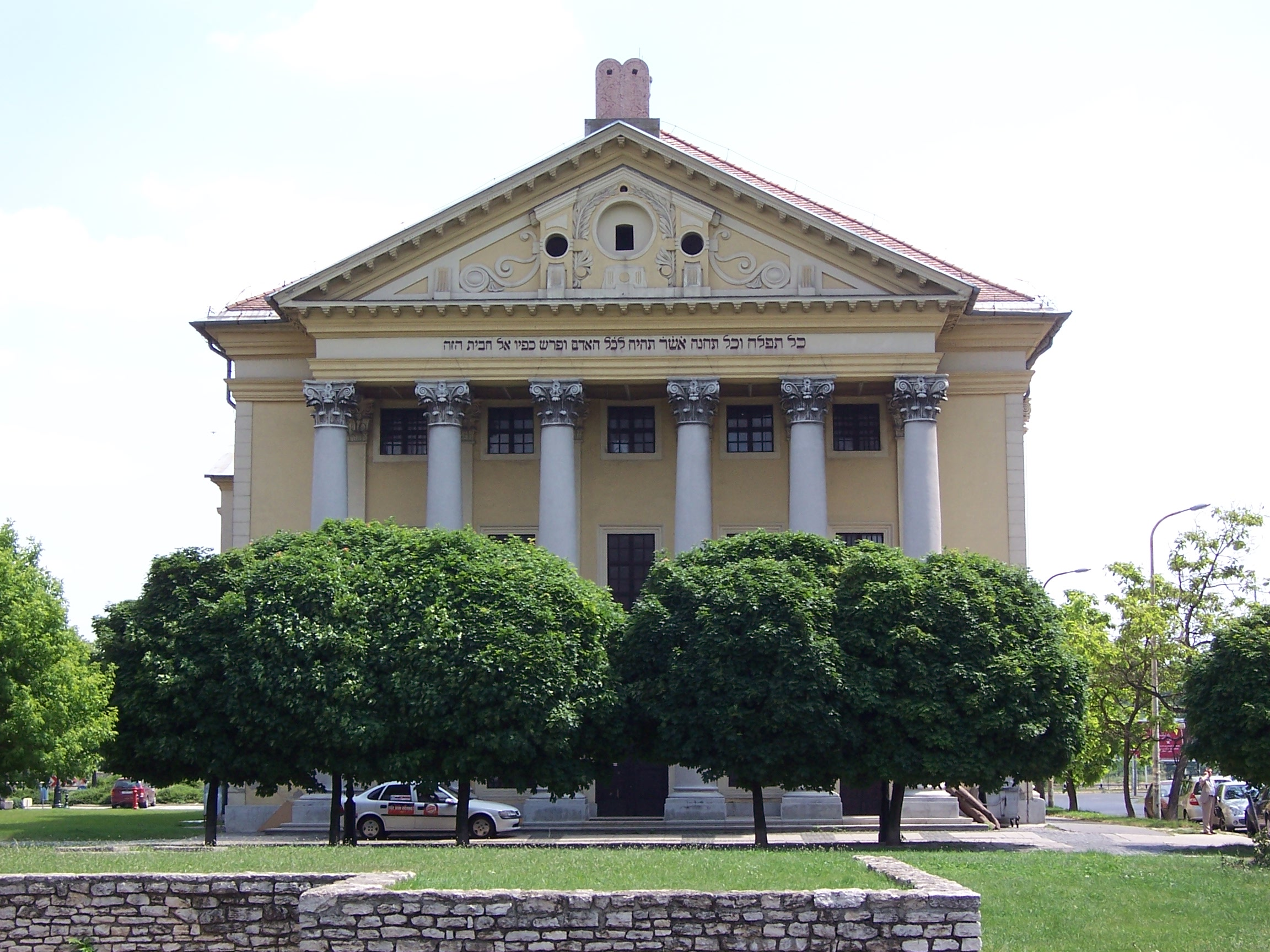
The Óbuda Synagogue, built on Münz's initiative in 1820–21.

Münz was born in Minkowitz around 1750. He studied under Meshullam Egra of Tysmienitz before living for several years in Brody, where he headed a yeshiva and acquired a great reputation as a Talmudical scholar.

== Rabbinic career ==
At the recommendation of Ezekiel Landau, he was called in 1790 to the chief rabbinate of Alt-Ofen, which had been vacant since the death of Nathan Günsburger in 1781. In 1793 he was appointed chief rabbi of the county of Pest.

Münz's learning spread the reputation of the congregation far beyond the confines of Hungary, and he represented the community at all royal ceremonies. Numerous religious questions were submitted to him from all parts of the Austrian monarchy. He was a brother-in-law of Moses Joshua Heschel, author of Yam ha-Talmud, and was related by marriage to Moses Sofer, who mentions him in his responsa on Even ha-'Ezer.

== Disputes with other rabbinic leaders ==
=== Tefillin ===
When in 1794 Mordecai Benet warned against the use of tefillin covered with double leathern straps, Münz charged Benet with ignorance, and argued that the use of such tefillin was legal. He was supported in this contention by Phinehas Hurwitz of Frankfurt, Hirsch Levin of Berlin, and Meshullam Egra of Presburg. Later it became known that the Vilna Gaon had expressed the same opinion. Münz induced Aaron Chorin to write to Benet in defense of this view, but Chorin received no answer.

=== Book approbation ===
When Chorin, in 1803, published his ‘Emek ha-shaveh with a cordial approbation by Moses Münz, Benet denounced it as heretical. Two years later the Arad congregation, after Benet's accusation, asked Münz's opinion upon the book. He declared (8 August 1805) that the author was to blame for certain statements in the first part, entitled Rosh Amanah, which were apt to mislead the public, but reaffirmed that the book contained no heresies. Later on, however, Münz summoned Chorin before a rabbinical tribunal at Alt-Ofen. On the second day of its session (1 September 1805) the former failed to appear, and he did not join in the sentence of condemnation of the book pronounced by his two colleagues.

=== Jewish soldiers eating legumes during Passover ===
As Münz had in 1811 ruled that Jewish soldiers could eat pulse on Pesaḥ, Eliezer Liebermann, author of Or Nogah, considered him a liberal, and applied to him for an endorsement of the Reform temple in Hamburg. Münz did not reply, but he wrote to Chorin an anonymous letter in which he decidedly condemned Reform.

== Death from cholera ==
Münz died of cholera during the 1826–1837 pandemic.

== Publications ==
- Anrede des Alt-Ofner Oberrabiners Moises Minz, an die dasige Judenschaft bey den Krönungs-Feyerlichkeiten des Königs von Ungarn Franz des Ersten, und deroselben Gemahlin Königin Maria Theresia auf Geheiss der Alt-Ofner Judengemeinde [Address of the Chief Rabbi of Alt-Ofen, Moses Münz, to the Jewish community at the coronation festivities of King Francis I of Hungary and his wife Queen Maria Theresa at the behest of the Jewish community of Alt-Ofen] (in German). Ofen: s.n. 1792.
- Drush le-yom beshurat hatslaḥat malkenu ha-adir ha-tamim Kaizer Frants [Address on the day of the announcement of the success of our king Kaiser Franz] (in Hebrew and German). Ofen. 1814. Delivered on the day of the peace proclamation of Francis I. With German translation by Mordecai Bresnitz.
- Devir ha-bayit [The Inner Sanctum] (in Hebrew). Vienna: Anton Strauss. 1822. Sermon inaugurating the Óbuda Synagogue.
- Sefer Maharam Mints: ape zutre, ve-hu mi-ḥelke ha-sheʼelot u-teshuvot shel Mosheh Mints [Responsa]. Maharam Mints ape zutra (in Hebrew). Prague: M. I. Landau. 1827. Collection of 26 responsa, with additions by his son Joseph Isaac Münz.
- Sefer Peri Ya'aḳov [The Fruits of Jacob] (in Hebrew). Alt-Ofen. 1830. Annotations to Peri Ya'aḳov, halakhic novellæ written by Jacob ben Moses.
