= Keep Quiet (film) =

2016 biographical documentary film

- Directed by: Joseph Martin; Sam Blair
- Produced by: Alex Holder; Danielle Clark; Nicole Stott
- Starring: Csanád Szegedi; Anne Applebaum; András Dezső; Rabbi Boruch Oberlander; Katalin Molnár Szegediné; Imréné Molnár; Eva 'Bobby' Neumann
- Cinematography: Márton Vízkelety
- Edited by: Ben Stark; Kim Gaster
- Music by: Philip Sheppard
- Production companies: AJH Films; Passion Pictures
- Release date: 2016
- Running time: 94 minutes
- Countries: United Kingdom; Hungary; Canada; Belgium; Poland
- Languages: English; Hungarian; Hebrew

Keep Quiet is a 2016 biographical documentary film about Hungarian politician Csanád Szegedi, known for his antisemitic comments and membership in the radical nationalist party Jobbik, who later discovered he was Jewish. The British-made film includes interviews with Szegedi, his grandmother who was a former Auschwitz concentration camp survivor and archive footage.

On 14 April 2016 the film premiered at the Tribeca Film Festival in the World Documentary Competition.

== Synopsis ==
Csanád Szegedi was a member of the Hungarian radical nationalist Jobbik party, who espoused antisemitic rhetoric. He was a founder of the Magyar Gárda (Hungarian Guard), a now-banned paramilitary wing of Jobbik. Then came a revelation which changed his life: Szegedi's maternal grandparents were Jewish and his grandmother a survivor of Auschwitz concentration camp who, fearing further persecution, had hidden her religious background.

The film follows Szegedi's on his three-year journey to embrace Judaism, forced to confront his family's past, his wrongdoing, and his country's turbulent history. But is this change a genuine process of reparation and spiritual awakening, or is he a desperate man with nowhere to turn?

== Reception ==
The film received positive reviews from critics. Frank Scheck from The Hollywood Reporter wrote, "Be prepared to talk about it after," and called the film "[An] amazing story. ... Should provoke strong controversy upon its theatrical release. It's fascinating throughout." Daniel Walber from NonFics called the film "[a] powerful narrative of repentance."

Keep Quiet was featured in "The 10 Best Movies at the 2016 Tribeca Film Festival" in Time Out New York. "If you want a controversial fest title, this is it." Jewish Week commented: "A superb piece of nonfiction filmmaking, telling a story of import with grace and intelligence." Slant Magazine wrote, "The filmmakers astutely reveal how a culture can eat another alive and somehow live with itself."
