= Watersprite Film Festival =

Annual student film festival in Cambridge, England

- Location: Cambridge, United Kingdom
- Founded: 2008
- Language: International
- Website: watersprite.org.uk

The Watersprite Film Festival (officially the Watersprite Cambridge International Student Film Festival) is an annual international student film festival held in Cambridge, England. Founded in 2008, it is cited as the largest student film festival in the world. The festival is a qualifying event for the British Independent Film Awards (BIFA) in the British Short Film category. It is free to enter and attend.

== History ==
The festival was established in 2008 by a group of university students in Cambridge to create a platform for emerging filmmakers. Early founders included Franzi Florack and future Film4 head Farhana Bhula. It held its first official event in 2009. The festival has grown significantly over the following decades; by its 17th edition in 2026, Watersprite received 2,234 short film submissions from 108 countries.

== Festival Programme ==
Held annually over a weekend in March, Watersprite events take place at venues across Cambridge, including the Old Divinity School at St John's College, Cambridge and the Cambridge Arts Picturehouse.

The programming includes:

- Screenings: Nominated short films across fiction, documentary, animation, and experimental genres.
- Masterclasses and Q&As: Educational panels featuring established filmmakers and actors. Past speakers include Olivia Colman, Bill Nighy, and Eddie Redmayne. The festival has also hosted dedicated directing masterclasses with David Yates and Mike Leigh.
- Creative Futures Day: An educational program produced in partnership with BBC Three, targeting 16–18-year-old students interested in pursuing careers in film and television.

Recent iterations of the festival have been supported by industry sponsors such as Amazon MGM Studios.

== Leadership and Organization ==
Watersprite is a registered charity in the UK. It is managed by a rotating committee of approximately 50 to 70 students from the University of Cambridge and Anglia Ruskin University.

The student committee is supported by a permanent Charity Director and an alumni Steering Committee. The festival's Board of Trustees is chaired by former BAFTA chair Hilary Bevan Jones. The factual and documentary programming is guided by Deputy Chair and documentary filmmaker Brian Woods.

== Jury and selection process ==
Watersprite uses a two-stage selection process. A volunteer committee initially screens and scores the submissions across four strands: Fiction, Documentary, Animation, and Experimental. Shortlisted entries are then evaluated by a final jury of film and television professionals who select the award winners. Notable past jurors include Academy Award-nominated director Chris Weitz, arts director Inigo Lapwood, and film producer Savannah James-Bayly.

== Awards ==
The festival issues awards across multiple technical and genre categories, such as Film of the Year and Best Original Film Music. Prizes focus on career progression, offering mentorships and development packages.
