= Tristram Fane Saunders =

English poet, critic, editor, and curator

- Born: London, England
- Education: Repton School; University of St Andrews (MLitt)
- Occupations: Poet; literary critic; journalist; editor; curator
- Employer: The Daily Telegraph
- Notable work: Before We Go Any Further (2023)
- Awards: New Poets Prize (2018); Pablo Neruda Prize for Poetry (2026)
- Website: tristramfanesaunders.com

Tristram Fane Saunders is an English poet, literary critic, journalist, editor, and curator. Formerly poetry critic and senior commissioning editor on the culture desk at The Daily Telegraph, he is the author of the poetry collection Before We Go Any Further (2023), founding editor of The Little Review, and poetry curator at Theatreship. From 2024 to 2026, he was Fellow Commoner in the Creative Arts at Trinity College, Cambridge.

== Early life and career ==
Born in London and raised in Yorkshire, Fane Saunders was educated at Repton School (2006–2011) and completed an MLitt in creative writing at the University of St Andrews in 2015.

After early work reviewing radio for Radio Times, he joined The Daily Telegraph, serving as the newspaper's poetry critic from 2017 to 2024 and as senior commissioning editor on its culture desk until leaving in 2024. Alongside his newspaper journalism, which included sitting on the judging panel for the 2018 Edinburgh Comedy Awards, he has reviewed fiction and poetry for BBC Radio 4's Front Row and The Times Literary Supplement, and served as a judge for the 2025–26 Michael Marks Awards for Poetry Pamphlets.

From October 2024 to 2026, Fane Saunders held a two-year appointment as Fellow Commoner in the Creative Arts at Trinity College, Cambridge, succeeding Mona Arshi and succeeded by Abigail Parry.

== Poetry and editorial work ==
Fane Saunders's poems have appeared in The Times Literary Supplement, The White Review, PN Review, and Poetry Ireland Review. He published five poetry pamphlets before his first full-length collection, including Postcards from Sulpicia (Tapsalteerie, 2015), a sequence of translations from the Roman poet Sulpicia; Woodsong (Smith|Doorstop, 2019), a loose retelling of the medieval Irish tale Buile Shuibhne that won the 2017–18 Poetry Business New Poets Prize judged by Kayo Chingonyi; and The Rake (Smith|Doorstop, 2022). In 2021, his work featured in the anthology New Poetries VIII (Carcanet Press) and he edited Edna St Vincent Millay: Poems and Satires for Carcanet Classics, an edition of verse by Edna St. Vincent Millay described by A. E. Stallings in The Times Literary Supplement as "a revolutionary re-ordering".

His debut full-length collection, Before We Go Any Further, was published by Carcanet Press in 2023 and shortlisted for the 2024 Seamus Heaney First Collection Poetry Prize. Combining formal verse on mental health, media language, and London psychogeography with a spoof anthology of lost Irish drinking songs, the collection was called "a debut packed full of surprises" by Philip Terry in The Guardian, who wrote that it "charts the emergence of a new voice which is at once warm and edgy". It was also reviewed by Stephen Sexton in The Irish Times and praised in Wild Court and London Grip for its formal dexterity, whereas Rupert Loydell in Tears in the Fence found some of its rhyme schemes "contrived" despite its technical assurance. In 2026, Fane Saunders won the 48th annual Pablo Neruda Prize for Poetry for his poem "Jukebox".

Alongside his print work, Fane Saunders directed the site-specific South London live poetry series and zine GRAVY (2023–2024) and is poetry curator at Theatreship, a floating arts venue in Canary Wharf, London. In 2025, he launched The Little Review, an independent, A6 pocket-sized triannual print magazine of poetry, essays, satire, and criticism named in homage to Margaret Anderson's modernist journal The Little Review (1914–1929). Covered in The Bookseller and PN Review, the magazine drew notice in the poetry sector for requiring contributors to submit at least one book review for every poem submitted.

== Selected bibliography ==
=== Poetry collections ===
- Fane Saunders, Tristram (2023). Before We Go Any Further. Manchester: Carcanet Press. ISBN 978-1-80017-325-5.

=== Selected pamphlets ===
- Intro #5 (Nasty Little Press, 2013)
- Postcards from Sulpicia (Tapsalteerie, 2015)
- Fane Saunders, Tristram (2019). Woodsong. Sheffield: Smith|Doorstop. ISBN 978-1-912196-70-8.
- Fane Saunders, Tristram (2022). The Rake. Sheffield: Smith|Doorstop. ISBN 978-1-914914-20-1.

=== Edited volumes ===
- Millay, Edna St. Vincent (2021). Fane Saunders, Tristram (ed.). Poems and Satires. Carcanet Classics. Manchester: Carcanet Press. ISBN 978-1-80017-167-1.
