= Inigo Lapwood =

British arts director, marine engineer, and data scientist

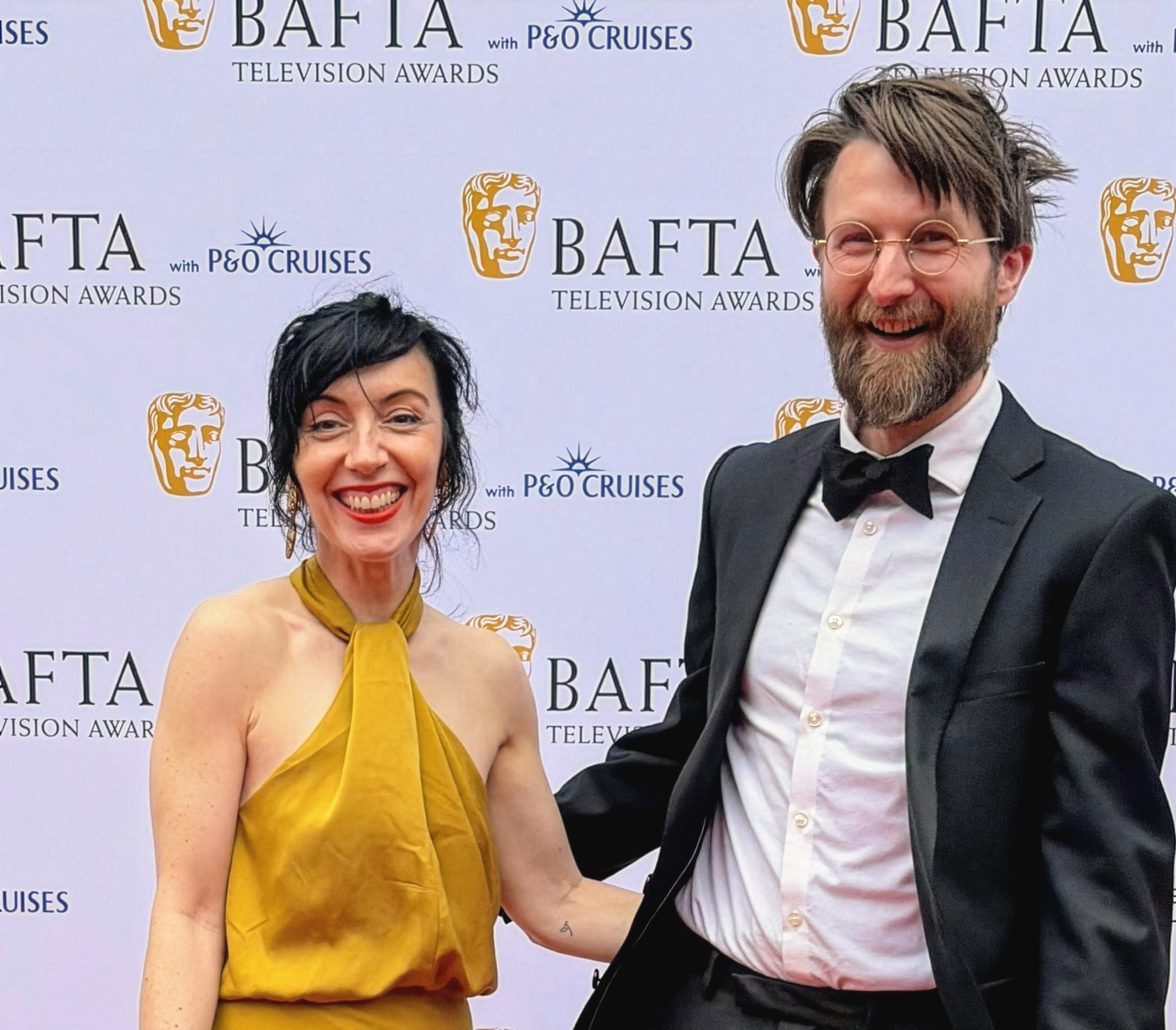
- Lapwood (right) with Theatreship head of Film Programming Natalie Hill at the 2026 BAFTA Television Awards
- Born: 1993 (age 32–33)
- Education: Christ Church, Oxford
- Occupations: Arts director; marine engineer; data scientist
- Known for: Founding of Theatreship
- Title: Director, Theatreship
- Board member of: Council of Experts, National Historic Ships UK; London and South East Advisory Board, Canal & River Trust
- Relatives: Anna Lapwood (sister)

Inigo Lapwood (born August 1993) is a British arts director, marine engineer, and data scientist. He is the founding director of Theatreship and Artship, the world's largest floating arts centre in the London Docklands, and serves on the Council of Experts for National Historic Ships UK.

== Early life and education ==
Lapwood is the brother of organist Anna Lapwood. He was educated at Christ Church, Oxford. In 2013, following a disciplinary incident involving a homemade flamethrower, Lapwood relocated onto a houseboat that was in a state of disrepair. He identifies repairing a sinking barge in Oxford when in need of a place to live as the starting point for his career in marine restoration.

== Career ==
=== Marine restoration ===
Lapwood's work involves the restoration and adaptive re-use of historic steel vessels. He has restored seven ships, two of which were listed on the National Historic Ships register.

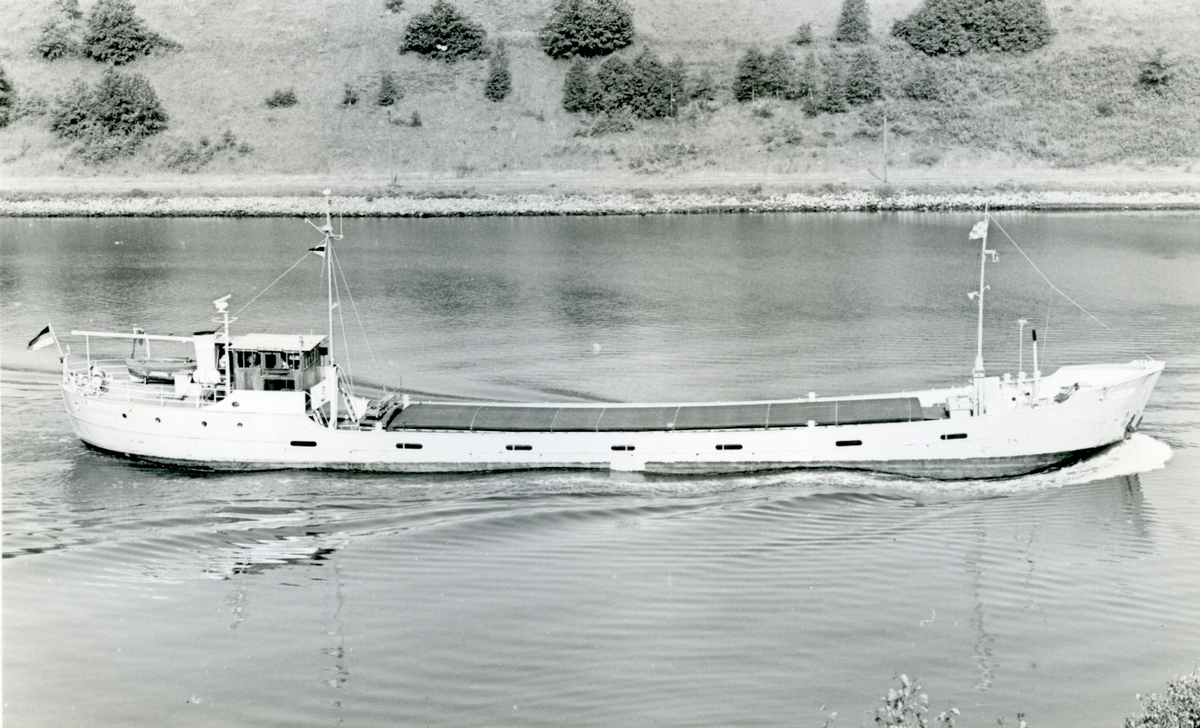
MS Unterelbe (1939) - a World War II era coaster now named Artship

As director of Theatreship, Lapwood converted a 1913 dry cargo vessel into a 100-seat floating theatre and cinema, which opened in 2024 with a cinema season in partnership with the British Film Institute. During the 2025 transit of a second vessel, Artship, from Germany to London Lapwood carried out an emergency 36-hour engine rebuild while in the North Sea.

=== Arts and entertainment ===
Lapwood has been Theatrical Ground Crew Director for Boomtown Festival and a juror for the Watersprite Film Festival.

=== Advisory work ===
He serves on the council of Experts for National Historic Ships UK and as an advisory board member for the Canal & River Trust.

=== Data Science ===
Lapwood co-founded YourStaffKnow.com Ltd based on his academic work at the university and supported by the Oxford University Innovation startup incubator. The company developed natural language processing tools utilising cluster analysis and feed-forward neural networks to analyse staff feedback for corporate and government clients including Danone, B Lab, Kraft, and the Foreign and Commonwealth Office. He exited the company in 2026.
