= Abigail Parry =

British poet, essayist and translator

Abigail Parry is a British poet and translator who lectures at Cardiff University. She is best known for her two poetry collections, Jinx and I Think We're Alone Now.

Her first collection, Jinx (2018, Bloodaxe Books), deals in trickery, gameplay, masks and costume, and was shortlisted for the Forward Prize for Best First Collection and the Seamus Heaney Prize for Best First Collection. Her second collection, I Think We're Alone Now (2023, Bloodaxe Books), investigates intimacy and estrangement. I Think We're Alone Now was shortlisted for the 2023 T. S. Eliot Prize and for Wales Book of the Year 2024.

In May 2026, Trinity College, Cambridge appointed Parry as Fellow Commoner in the Creative Arts for a two-year term beginning in the 2026–27 academic year, succeeding Tristram Fane Saunders.

== Works ==
- Jinx (2018, Bloodaxe Books)
- I Think We're Alone Now (2023, Bloodaxe Books)
