= Theatreship =

Theatre in London, England

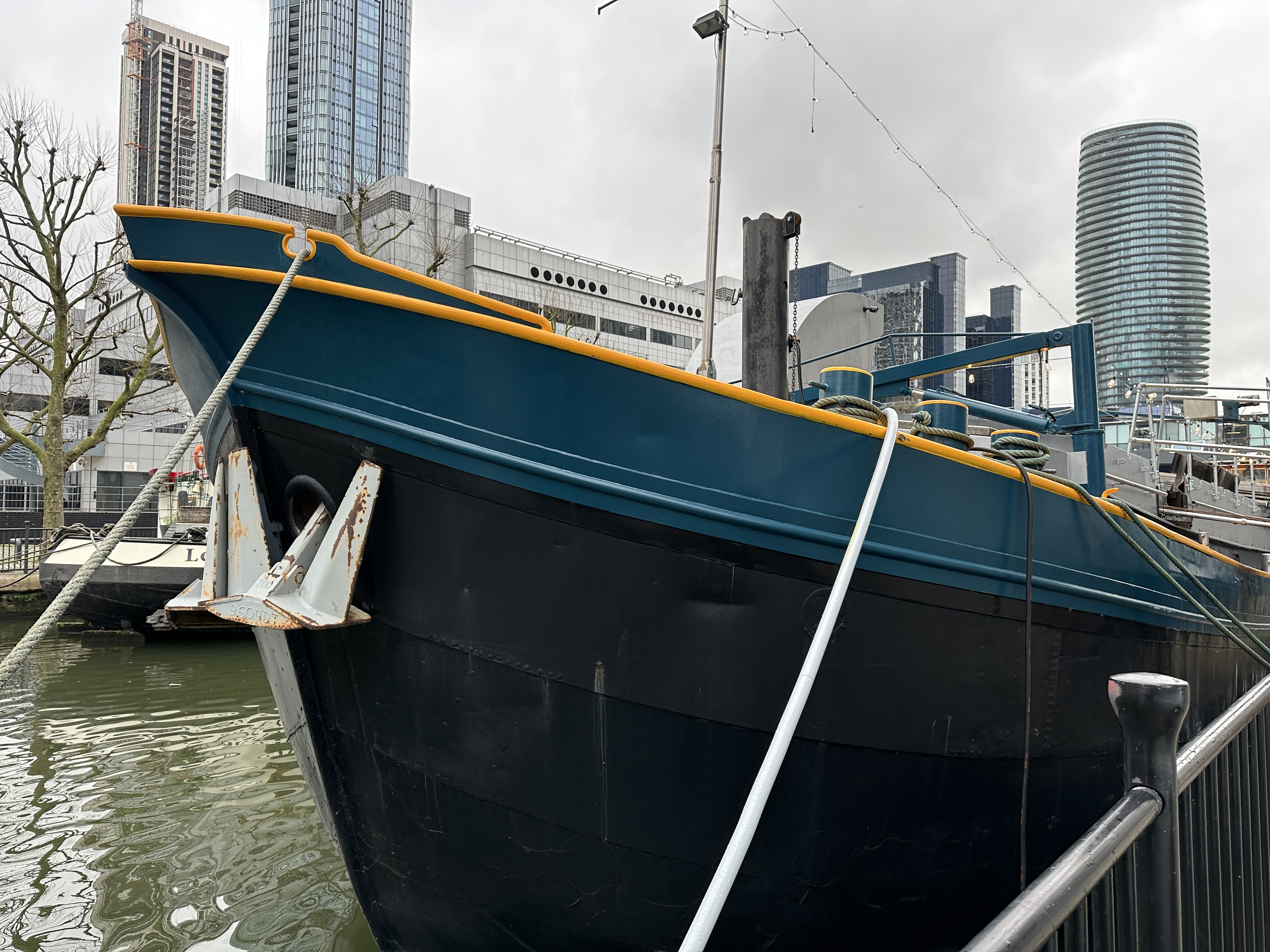
- Theatreship Bow
- Interactive map of Theatreship
- Location: Canary Wharf; London, E14; United Kingdom
- Coordinates: 51.501267°N 0.016149°W
- Seating type: Variable
- Capacity: 90 - 280
- Type: Arts venue
- Public transit: South Quay

Construction
- Opened: 2024; 2 years ago

Website
- theatreship.co.uk

Theatreship is a not-for-profit live music venue, cinema and arts centre on a converted historic cargo ship in the docks of Canary Wharf, London.

Theatreship opened to the public in January 2024 and is the first vessel in the Canal and River Trust's 'Arts and Heritage Berth'. As of 2025, it has been joined by a sister vessel, Artship. Together the two vessels form the world's largest floating arts centre.

== Programme ==
Programming on the ship focuses on experimental, under-represented and interdisciplinary music and arts, with a particular remit to support new work and genre-pushing artists.

Theatreship's programme opened with a season of the films of Powell and Pressburger paired with contemporary live performances as a part of the British Film Institute's 2024 celebration of the filmmakers.

Theatreship has subsequently collaborated with the BFI on further film programmes, including the 'Art of Action' and 'Too Much: Melodrama on Film' seasons. The venue also screens historic silent films accompanied by newly commissioned live musical scores.

Theatreship runs a regular weekly free mystery cinema night, where audience members do not know what the film will be in advance.

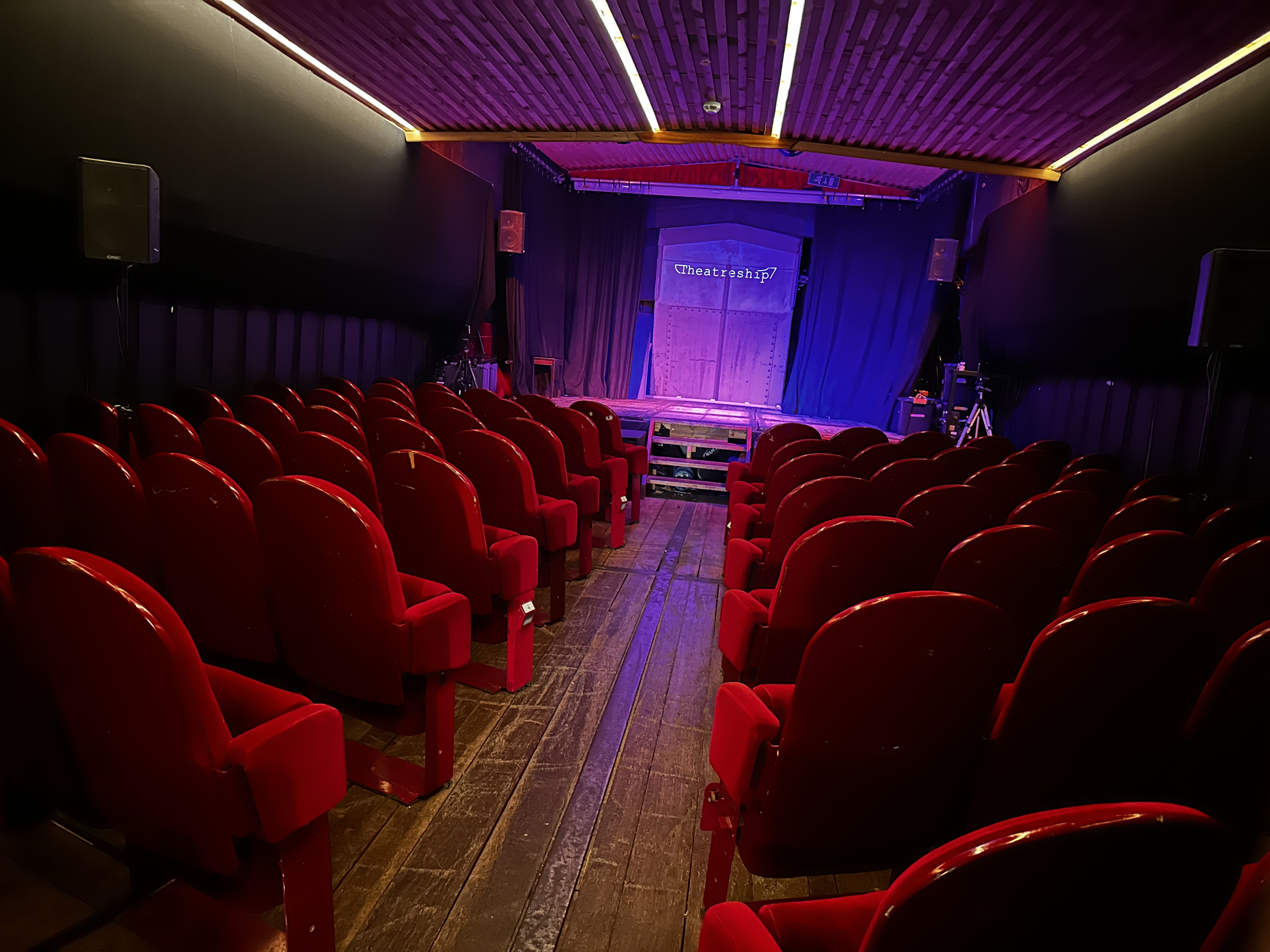
The cargo hold on Theatreship

Beyond film, Theatreship curates a live music programme that heavily features traditional folk music and maritime heritage. The venue hosts regular acoustic singarounds, such as "Songs on the Water". The ship also serves as a residency space for the London folk collective Broadside Hacks, whose recurring folk club onboard was ranked number 7 in Time Out magazine's list of the "50 Best Nights Out In London" for 2025.

The venue's classical and contemporary music programming has included performances by string ensembles such as the Modulus Quartet, who use the ship's hold to perform modern compositions paired with visual projections. The space is also used by independent artists and promoters across multiple music genres, including electronic, acoustic, Carnatic, indie, shoegaze, and soul.

== Operational model ==
Theatreship operates as a not-for-profit. The organisation operates a no-questions-asked discounted ticketing policy to lower financial barriers for attendees. It has also received funding from local government bodies, including a 2025/26 grant from the London Borough of Tower Hamlets to support community accessibility.

== People ==
Theatreship is led by a team of volunteer creatives. The project was founded by Inigo Lapwood, an arts director and marine engineer who serves on the Council of Experts for National Historic Ships UK. BAFTA-winning television producer Natalie Hill is the head of film programming and concert pianist Karl Lutchmayer, a Steinway Artist and former professor at Trinity Laban Conservatoire of Music and Dance, is the head of classical music programming. Poet and critic Tristram Fane Saunders, founding editor of The Little Review, serves as poetry curator onboard.

== History ==
The vessel was built in 1913 as a dry-cargo sailing barge originally named Fiat. After operating across Northern Europe, the ship was purchased in the Netherlands. In June 2022, the Theatreship team sailed the vessel across the North Sea to London, where it was re-fitted as a public arts venue.

In 2025, the venue was under threat of closure from a new tower development. After 14 months and support from cultural and heritage organisations, including the British Film Institute, the V&A, the Music Venue Trust and the Greater London Authority, along with representations from over 5,000 members of the public, protections were put in place to enable Theatreship to continue operating.
