= Óbuda Synagogue =

Chabad synagogue in Óbuda, Budapest, Hungary

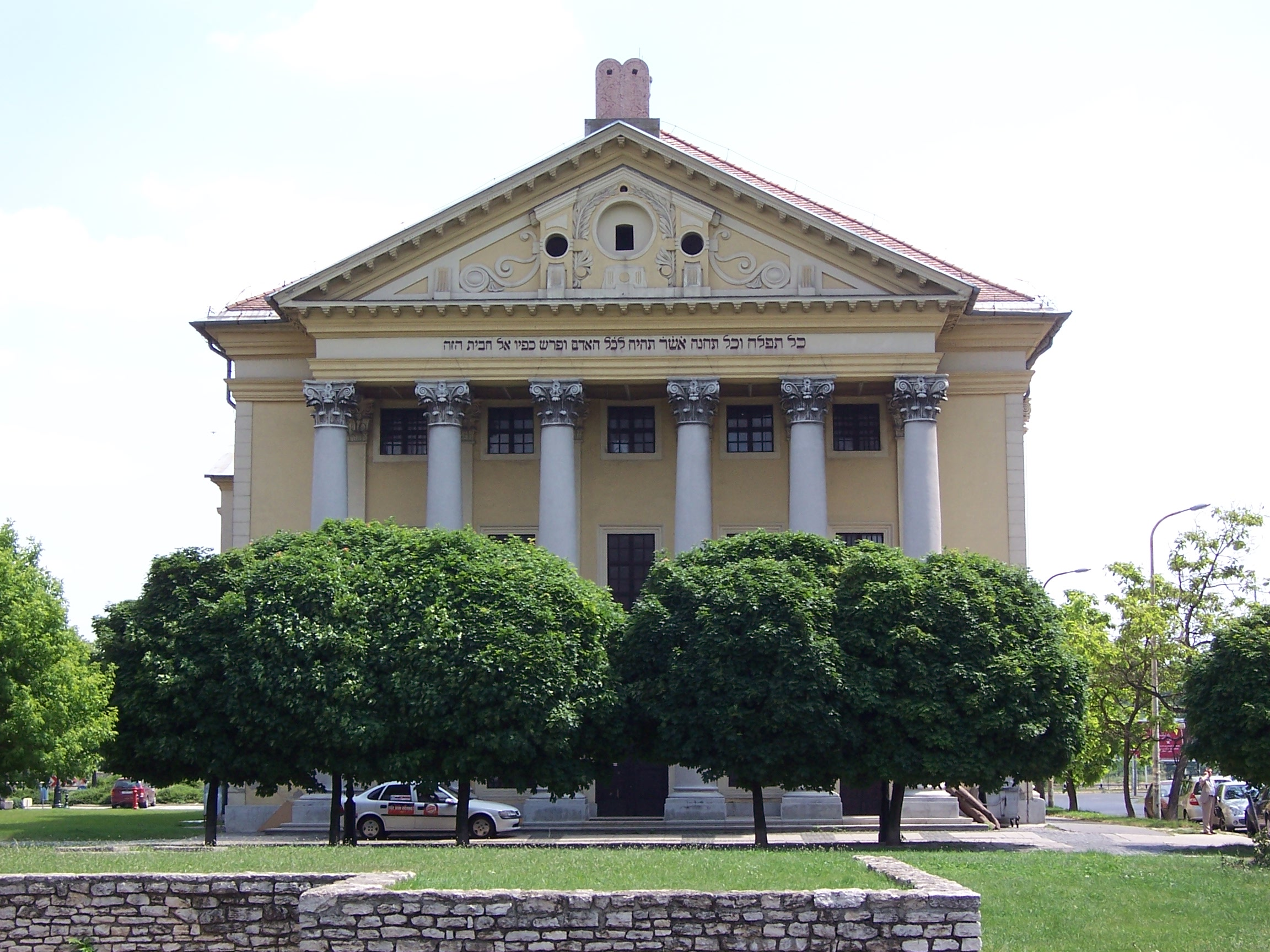
- The synagogue in 2005

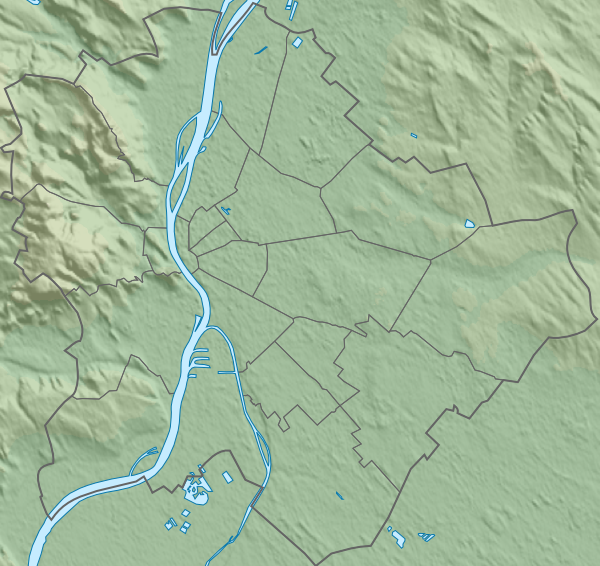
- Location of the synagogue in Budapest

Religion
- Affiliation: Orthodox Judaism
- Rite: Nusach Ashkenaz (1730–2010); Nusach Ari (since 2010)
- Ecclesiastical or organizational status: Synagogue (1821–c. 1939); Profane use (1939–2010); Synagogue (since 2010)
- Leadership: Rabbi Slomó Köves
- Status: Active

Location
- Location: Lajos u. 163, Óbuda, III district, Budapest
- Country: Hungary
- Interactive map of Óbuda Synagogue
- Coordinates: 47°32′13″N 19°02′45″E

Architecture
- Architect: András Landherr
- Type: Synagogue architecture
- Style: Neoclassical Empire
- Established: c. 1730s (as a congregation)
- Groundbreaking: 1820
- Completed: 1821 (original); 2016 (restored)
- Materials: Brick

Website
- obudaizsinagoga.zsido.com (in Hungarian)

The Óbuda Synagogue is an Orthodox Jewish congregation and synagogue, located in Óbuda, in the III district of Budapest, Hungary. The synagogue was completed in 1821 by an Orthodox congregation who worshipped in the Ashkenazi rite, founded in the 1730s. The congregation made a change to Neolog in 1831; and, since 2010, have followed the Orthodox Chabad movement, worshipping in the Ari rite.

During World War II, the synagogue was acquired by the Hungarian Government for profane uses and was returned to the community in 2010. The synagogue was extensively renovated and restored by 2016. The congregation is led by Rabbi Slomó Köves.

== History ==
Jews settled in Óbuda, today a neighborhood of Budapest, from c. 1712 at a time when Jews were forbidden to live in Buda. Countess Zichy invited them to live on Zichy family property in Óbuda. A synagogue was constructed in 1737. The present building replaced it on the same site, completed in 1821. The building's original copper roof was requisitioned by the government and melted for munitions production during World War I. The Jewish building had not been singled out; the Holy Trinity Cathedral, Sibiu was only one of the many churches that lost its bells as not only church bells but roofs, gutters, and even brass crucifixes were melted down across the Empire to produce copper for the war effort.

At the time the synagogue was built, the community of Óbuda was the largest Jewish community in Hungary.

According to the boastful author of an 1822 Austro-Hungarian guidebook, not only was the synagogue the "most magnificent" new building in Óbuda, few synagogues elsewhere could compare to its magnificence. It was "undoubtedly" one of the most magnificent synagogues in the entire Austro-Hungarian Empire, and one of the finest in all Europe, "Not even the Jewish temple of Temesvár can compete with it in pomp, not to mention the old synagogues of Prague. The only building that may outdo it in grandiosity is the building of the Jewish community of Amsterdam," (a reference to the Portuguese Synagogue in Amsterdam).

In 1831, following the death of Rabbi Moses Münz, the congregation left Orthodoxy to follow reformist Neolog Judaism.

Beginning in 1848, the congregation expressed its support for Hungarian nationalism by having sermons delivered every other week in Hungarian. In 1850, the town had 3439 Jewish residents, 31.4% of the population.

The community shrank throughout the nineteenth and early twentieth centuries as members moved into the flourishing city of Pest. But the town, district III of Budapest was still 10% Jewish in 1926. In the 1970s, the diminished Jewish community sold the building for use as a television studio.

Used for a long time as a TV studio, it was reinaugurated as a synagogue on September 5, 2010, Yona Metzger, chief rabbi of Israel and Zsolt Semjén, Hungarian vice-prime minister, being present. The new rabbi is Rabbi Slomó Köves, a member of the Chabad-Lubavitch movement.

== Architecture ==
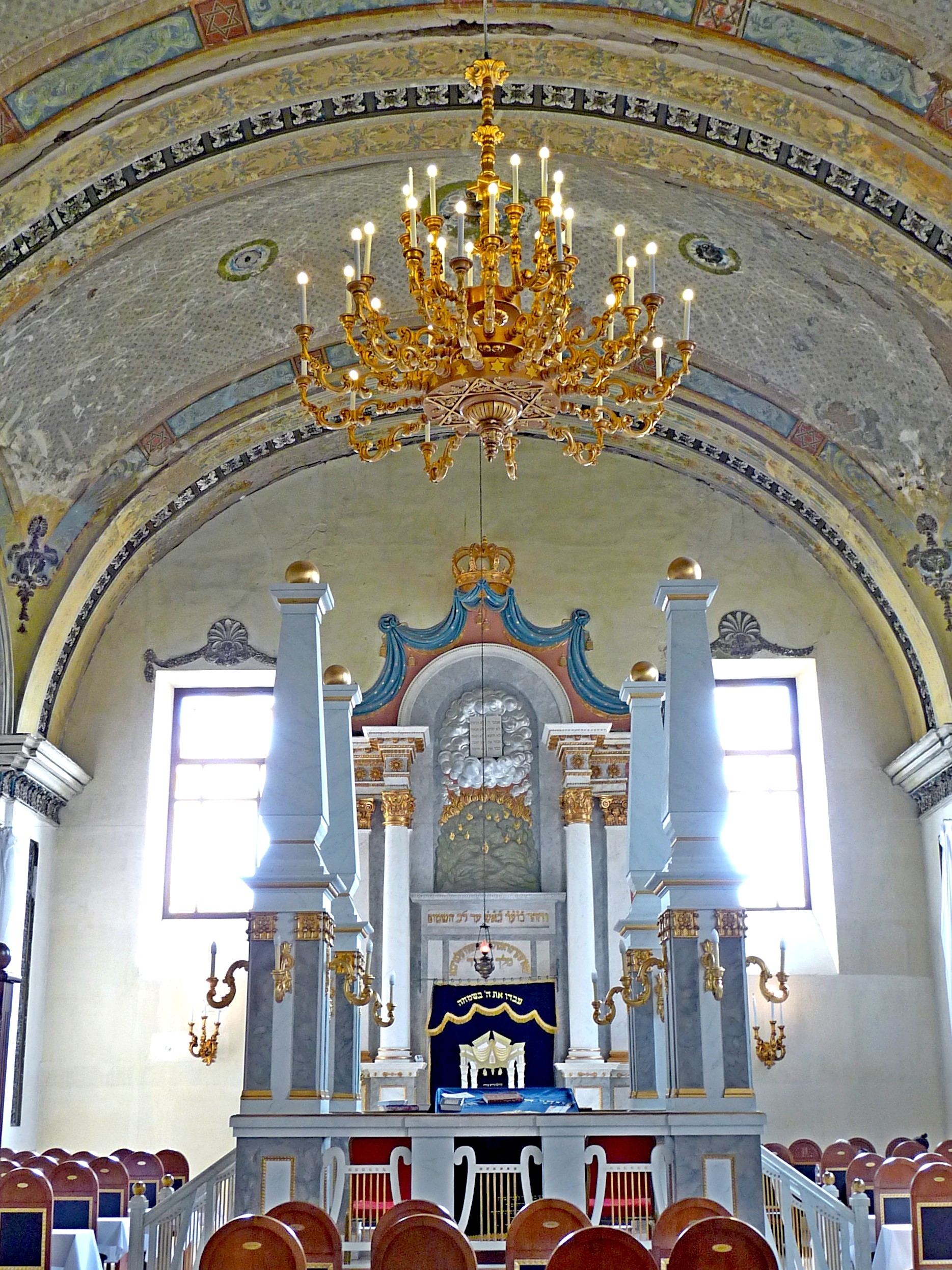
The synagogue interior

Designed by Andreas Landesherr in the French Neoclassical Empire style, Landesherr greatly enlarged and embellished the 1731 building, altering the appearance beyond recognition. The pediment and six Corinthian columns of the façade gave the synagogue the aspect of a classical temple. The pediment was embellished with carved neoclassical ornament, and surmounted by the tablets of the Ten Commandments. On the side walls two tiers of round-arched windows alternate with classical pilasters.

Inside, the bimah boasted four impressive corner columns in the form of the then popular Egyptian Revival obelisks. Each obelisk stood atop a plinth, both heavily embellished with carved, classical ornament, capped by a sphere capped by an eagle. The Torah ark was flanked by classical columns, and topped by Tablets of the Law, surmounted by a crown and surrounded by a painted burst of clouds. It once held no fewer than 28 Torah scrolls belonging to the wealthy congregation. The women's gallery ran along the northern and western walls. Fourteen chandeliers hung from the ceiling, causing some congregants to complain about the extravagance of the synagogue's directors.

== See also ==
- History of the Jews in Hungary
- List of synagogues in Hungary
