= Jonathan Jacob Meijer =

Dutch serial sperm donor (born 1981)

- Born: 19 May 1981 (age 45); Netherlands
- Occupations: Sperm donor; musician
- Known for: Being the donor of at least 550 children

Jonathan Jacob Meijer (born 19 May 1981) is a sperm donor, born in the Netherlands. As of April 2023, a Dutch court estimated that Meijer had sired between 500 and 600 children, and may have sired up to 1,000 children in total across several continents.

== Sperm donation ==
Meijer started sperm donations in 2007.

In 2017, Meijer was banned from donating sperm to Dutch clinics after the Dutch Society of Obstetrics and Gynaecology revealed he was the donor of over 100 children in 11 different clinics. The Dutch Donor Child Foundation determined that in addition to the 102 sired via clinics, at least 80 additional children in the Netherlands were sired via private arrangements.

After his Dutch ban, Meijer continued donating to international clinics such as Cryos International, as well as private websites.

In 2023, a civil lawsuit was lodged against Meijer by the Donorkind Foundation, requesting court action due to fears of unintentional incest amongst the children and due to violating the Dutch limit of 25 donor children. Meijer's defence stated that he merely wanted to help parents who were unable to conceive, and that a decision against him would amount to legal castration. Meijer told the court that at present he only donates to parents who have already sired a child with him. In April 2023, a Dutch court ordered Meijer to stop donating sperm and subjected him to a 100,000 euro fine for each future infraction. In addition, Meijer was instructed by the court to request destruction of his semen stored in stock by clinics, unless held in reserve for parents of children conceived by his sperm. The court determined that Meijer "deliberately misinformed" donation recipients about the number of children he had fathered. The court found that this creates a "huge kinship network, with hundreds of half-siblings" and that it is "sufficiently plausible" that the children could suffer negative psychosocial consequences as a result.

On 2 July 2023, in an exclusive interview with the Brazilian weekly television news program Fantástico, Meijer admitted to tricking women who wanted to get pregnant. He also acknowledged that he lied to the families.

In July 2024, Netflix released a three-episode documentary series about Meijer, entitled The Man with 1,000 Kids. On July 5, Meijer uploaded a YouTube video admitting he watched the first part of the Netflix docuseries. He stated he had filed a slander report about claims he swapped or mixed sperm with another donor, Leon.

On 3 September 2024, in an interview with the talk show Eva from the NPO 1 broadcaster in the Netherlands, Meijer said that he has filed a lawsuit against Netflix, the developer of the program. "Five hundred and fifty. That's the number I know for sure. Anything above that is just speculation", Meijer said, referring to the number of children he has fathered from sperm donations. As the name of the Netflix series suggests, "The Man with a Thousand Children" presents another version of the case. The accounts presented their claim that Meijer fathered at least 1,000 babies and suggest that the number could be as high as 3,000.

== YouTube ==
Meijer has a YouTube channel in which he posts his music as well as spiritual and lifestyle vlogs. The channel held 4,500 subscribers in March 2023 and most recently had 26,100 subscribers as of June 2025 following the Netflix docuseries.
