= Csanád Szegedi =

Hungarian politician (born 1982)

Csanád Szegedi MEP
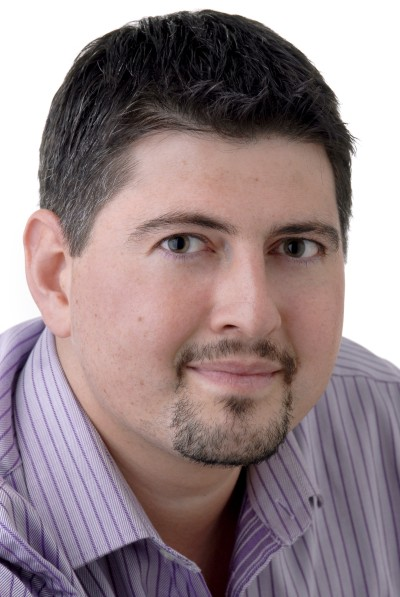
- Szegedi in 2009

Member of the European Parliament
- In office 14 July 2009 – 30 June 2014

Personal details
- Born: September 22, 1982 (age 44) Miskolc, Hungary
- Party: Jobbik (2003–2012)
- Parent(s): Miklós Szegedi; Katalin Molnár (Meisels)
- Relatives: Márton Szegedi
- Education: Károli Gáspár University of the Reformed Church in Hungary
- Occupation: Politician

Csanád Szegedi (Hungarian: [ˈt͡ʃɒnaːd ˈsɛɡɛdi]; born 22 September 1982) is a Hungarian politician and former member of the European Parliament. He was a member of the neo-nazi Hungarian radical nationalist Jobbik political party between 2003 and 2012. In 2012, Szegedi gained international attention after acknowledging that he had Jewish roots. He was also accused of previous bribery to try to keep that revelation a secret, and subsequently resigned from all Jobbik political posts. Szegedi has since become a religious Jew.

== Personal life ==
Szegedi was born in Miskolc. His father, Miklós Szegedi, a Christian ethnic Magyar, is a wood carving sculptor, and his mother, Katalin Molnár (née Meisels), was a software engineer born to Jewish parents.

He has a brother, Márton Szegedi, who was Jobbik's mayoral candidate in Miskolc, but left the party in 2012.

He graduated from Károli Gáspár University of the Reformed Church in Hungary. Between 1999 and 2010 he organized trips to Transylvania, a historic region belonging to Hungary until 1920. In 2002 he published a book on old Hungarian personal names. Between 2006 and 2012 he also had a clothing line called Turul, named after the mythical bird of Hungarian legends.

Prior to the revelations of Szegedi's Jewish ancestry, Szegedi was notorious for his antisemitism. In June 2012, Szegedi reported that he had learned his maternal grandparents were Jewish: his grandmother a survivor of Auschwitz concentration camp and his grandfather a veteran of forced labour camps. Jewish custom is matrilineal, meaning, under religious law, Szegedi is Jewish. Szegedi was raised Hungarian Reformed and did not initially practice the Jewish religion. Szegedi said he had defined himself as someone with "ancestry of Jewish origin — because I declare myself 100 percent Hungarian." He turned to Rabbi Slomó Köves, of the Lubavitch movement, for help. He adopted the name Dovid, wore a kippah, learnt Hebrew, visited Israel, and had himself circumcised. Szegedi now lives as a practicing Jew, observing the Sabbath and attending synagogue.

Szegedi is married with two sons; his wife supports his new identity and in 2017 was reportedly in the process of converting to Judaism.

In August 2012 he apologized to Rabbi Köves for his antisemitic remarks, and in 2013 he traveled to Israel where he and his wife visited the Western Wall and the Yad Vashem museum. Recently he has been interested in arts; his paintings are influenced by his newly found religion.

The 2016 biographical documentary film Keep Quiet documents his return to Judaism.

== Political career ==
Szegedi became a member of Jobbik, the country's biggest far-right political force early in the party's history. In 2006 he became vice-president of the party. In 2007, he was a founding member of the Hungarian Guard, which was banned in 2009, at which time Szegedi joined the Jobbik party. Between 2005 and 2009 he was the leader of the party in Borsod-Abaúj-Zemplén county. From 2009 to 2014 he served in the European Parliament in Brussels.

His political views have often been described as consisting of anti-EU, anti-Roma, and anti-Semitic characteristics by different press outlets. He outlined them in a book, I Believe in Hungary’s Resurrection. As an active Member of the European Parliament he openly advocated leaving the European Union and establishing a "new Turanian alliance" with Central Asian states as a supporter of Hungarian Turanism. Szegedi paid from the European Parliament budget three men – Előd Novák, Balázs Molnár and Roland Kürk – who according to Tamás Polgár, better known as Tomcat, were members of the editorial board of the kuruc.info, a racist website associated with Jobbik. All three received their salaries as "local assistants" to the member of parliament. Szegedi has also propagated the use of the Old Hungarian script.

On 28 July 2012, Szegedi released a statement to the press, which was reproduced on the party's website that he had with immediate effect resigned from all the various positions still held in Jobbik. Szegedi expressed his wish to remain a Member of the European Parliament. The Jobbik statement confirmed that the news of his mother's Jewish ancestry "did not pose any threat to his positions in the party." The statement went on to say that Szegedi allegedly "tried to stop news published about his origin by offering money," which he denied. This prompted Jobbik vice-president Előd Novák to call for Szegedi's full resignation, describing the MEP's actions as a 'spiral of lies'. Jobbik said its issue is the suspected bribery, not his Jewish roots.

Following his profession of Judaism, Szegedi obtained thousands of copies of his own book and burned them. He now feels that Jobbik offers only the euphoria of hatred to people who are in despair.

== See also ==
- 2009 European Parliament election in Hungary
- Péter Jakab
