= Artship =

1939 coastal cargo ship and London museum vessel

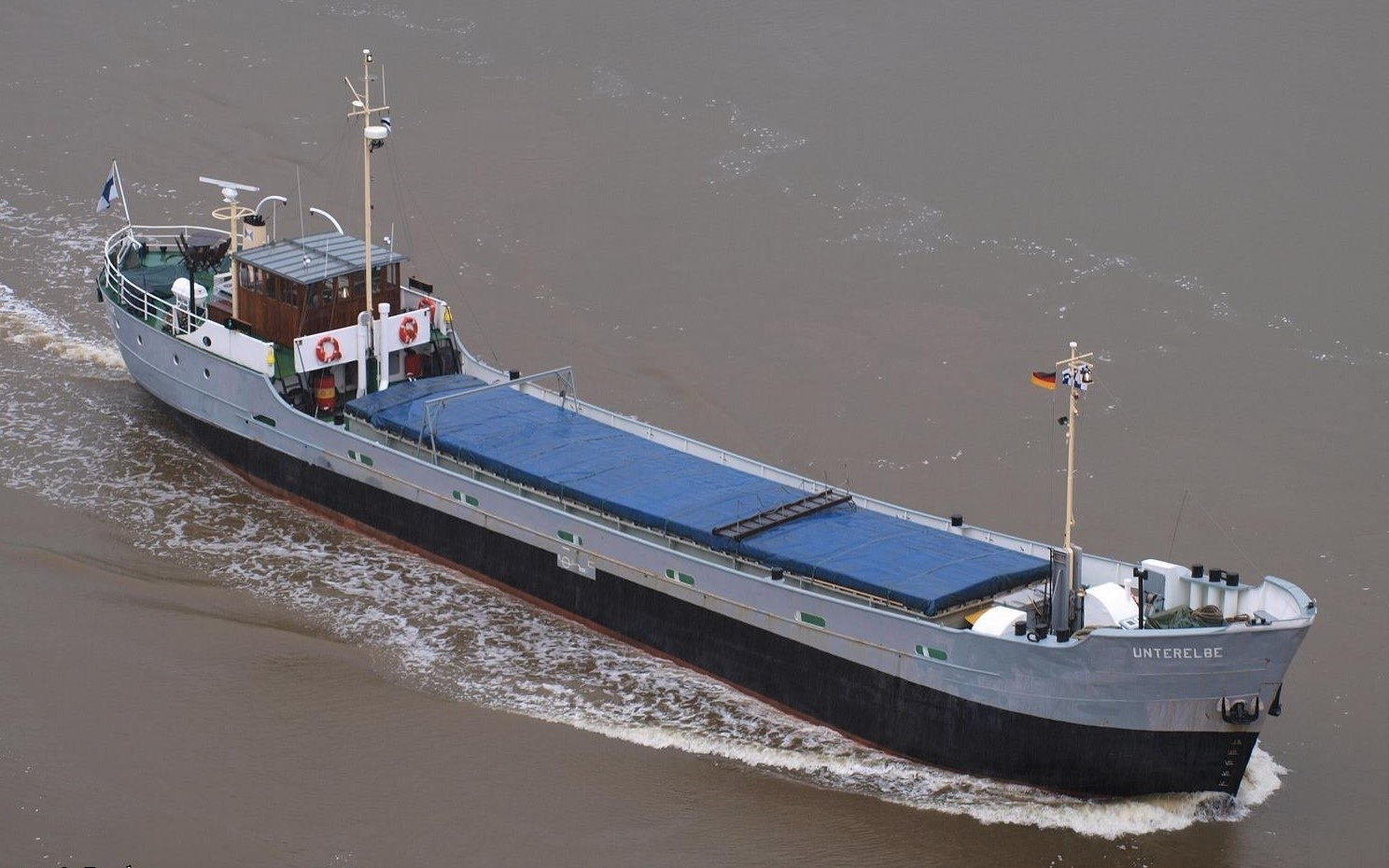
- Unterelbe (now Artship) in 2010

History
- Name: Danzig; Freida Jonas; Unterelbe; Ramona; Artship
- Port of registry: Germany (1939–1988); Finland (1988–2018); Germany (2018–2023); United Kingdom (2023–present)
- Builder: Holst-Schiffswerft, Hamburg-Neuenfelde, Germany
- Yard number: 154
- Launched: 1939
- Identification: IMO number: 5373696
- Status: Active (arts venue)

General characteristics
- Type: Coastal trading vessel
- Tonnage: 259 GT
- Length: 46.70 m (153 ft 3 in)
- Beam: 6.78 m (22 ft 3 in)
- Draught: 2.25 m (7 ft 5 in)
- Propulsion: 1 × Deutz RA6M528 marine diesel engine (215 kW)

Artship (formerly MS Unterelbe) is a 1939 German motor coaster (Küstenmotorschiff). It is the only coaster of its era still in operational condition, and the last surviving seaworthy German coastal motor ship built before the Second World War. The ship was requisitioned by the Kriegsmarine as a munitions transport during World War II before spending eighty years in commercial cargo service and joining the Finnish Heritage Ship Register.

In 2024, the ship crossed the North Sea to London under its own power. In 2025 it underwent repairs in Chatham, Kent to operate as a floating arts centre alongside Theatreship in Canary Wharf's West India Docks. Together the two vessels form the world's largest floating arts centre.

== Construction and early history ==
Built by Holst-Schiffswerft in Hamburg-Neuenfelde (Hull No. 154), the ship was launched in 1939 for owner J. H. Jonas. As a Küstenmotorschiff, its shallow draft was designed for navigating the inland waterways and shallow coastal waters of the North and Baltic Seas.

== World War II service ==
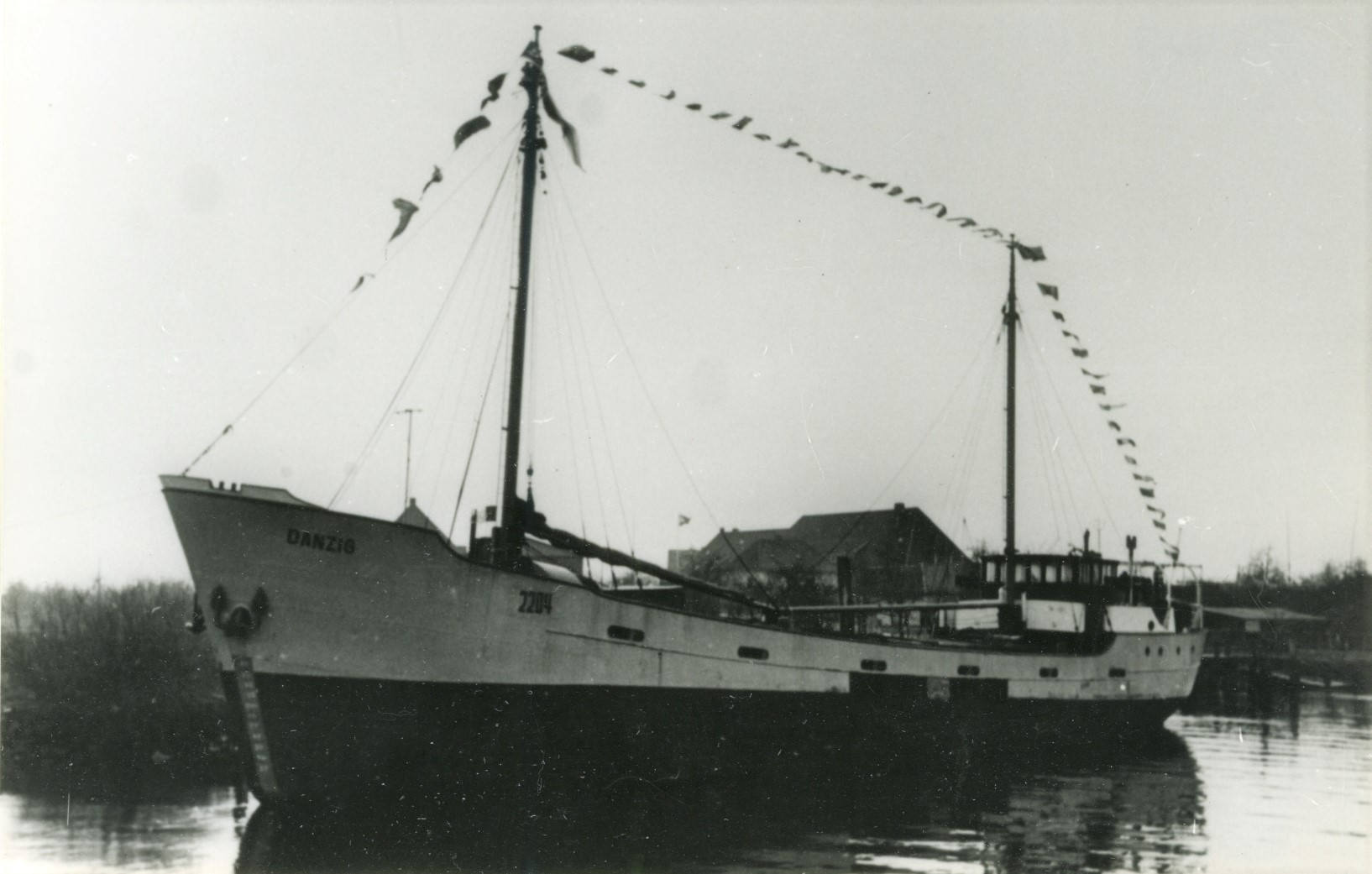
MS Unterelbe as MS Danzig during World War II - archive photograph taken 1942

Requisitioned by the Kriegsmarine upon completion in 1939, the ship served as a munitions transport, delivering torpedoes for the U-boat fleet. In 1940, it was mobilized for Operation Sea Lion, the planned invasion of Britain. Following the operation's cancellation, it returned to coastal supply duties. In 1945, the Tripartite Merchant Marine Commission initially seized the vessel but exempted it from war reparations to maintain local logistics and returned it to its pre-war civilian owner, J.H. Jonas.

== Structural modifications ==
The ship underwent two major structural modifications:

- 1950: The main deck was raised by 40 cm (16 in) to increase cargo capacity. The ship was renamed Frieda Jonas in 1951.
- 1961: Under owner Captain Ludwig Lührs (who renamed it Unterelbe in 1958), the Krooß-Werft shipyard in Wischhafen lengthened the hull to an overall length of 46.70 m (153 ft 3 in).

== Commercial and heritage service (1960s–2018) ==
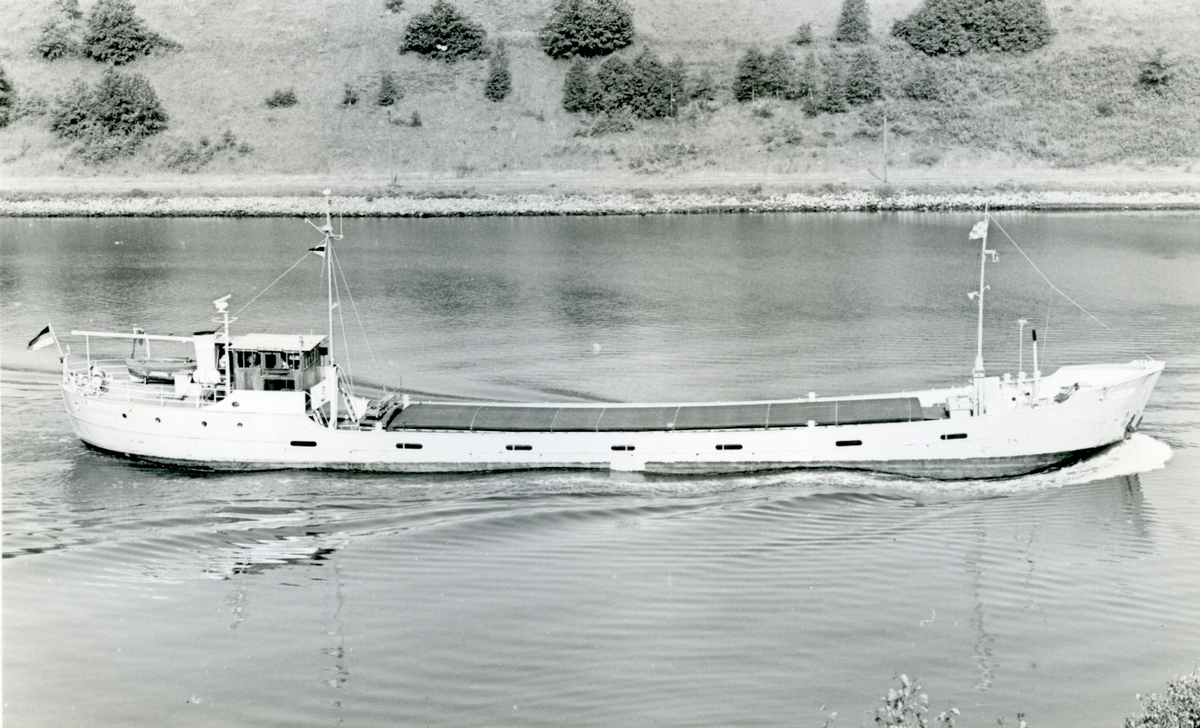
MS Unterelbe (1939) - archive photograph

Between 1963 and 1987, the ship passed through several German commercial owners. In 1987, its original engine was replaced with a 1950s-era, 215 kW Deutz RA6M528 marine diesel. Sold to Finnish owners in 1988 and renamed Ramona, the vessel was commercially registered in Porvoo, where it operated as a cargo transport in the surrounding archipelago. In 1999, Finnish sea captain Jan G. Rautawaara purchased the vessel, reverting its name to Unterelbe. It was inducted into the Finnish Heritage Ship Register in 2005 on the basis of its rarity as a preserved seagoing cargo ship of its era, representing a class of vessel that was historically common in Finnish ports. The ship continued to work as a cargo vessel over this time, transporting varied cargoes, including the 1914 yacht Svea.

== Flensburg stay and museum project ==
In 2018, Captain Jens Boysen returned the ship to Germany, mooring it at the Historischer Hafen in Flensburg. Boysen planned to establish the vessel as a working museum ship representing the mid-20th century coastal trade. The project faced financial pressure from regulatory compliance. Following Boysen's death in January 2023, the ship faced an uncertain future.

== Restoration and transfer to London ==
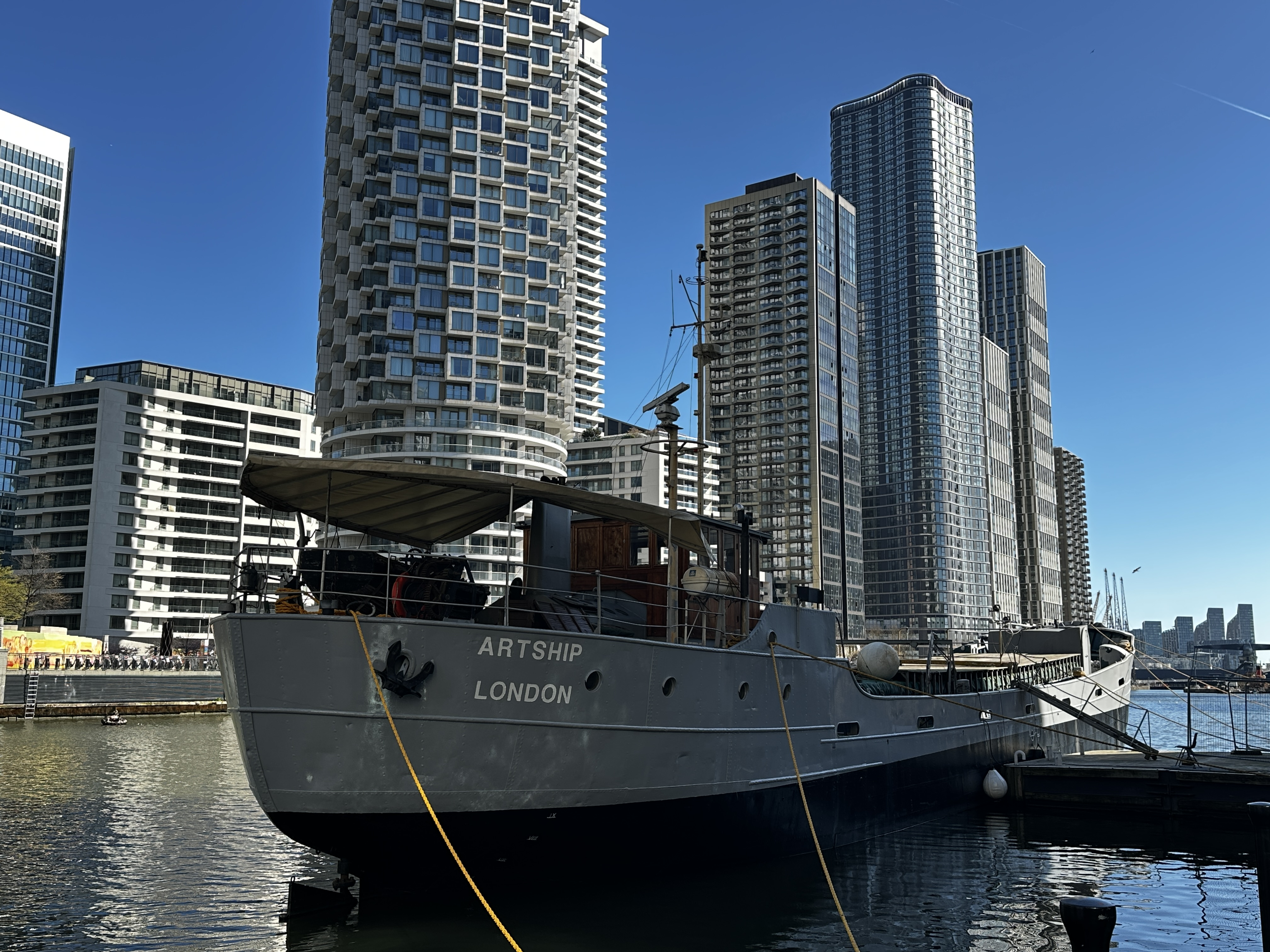
Artship moored in Canary Wharf, London

In May 2023, British marine engineer Inigo Lapwood acquired the vessel, expressing his intention to protect the ship from the risk of scrapping, preserve it, and open it to the public as an arts venue in London.

Before it could depart for the UK, the vessel was detained by the Berufsgenossenschaft Verkehr (BG Verkehr), which required the ship to meet updated safety and classification standards for its voyage across the North Sea.

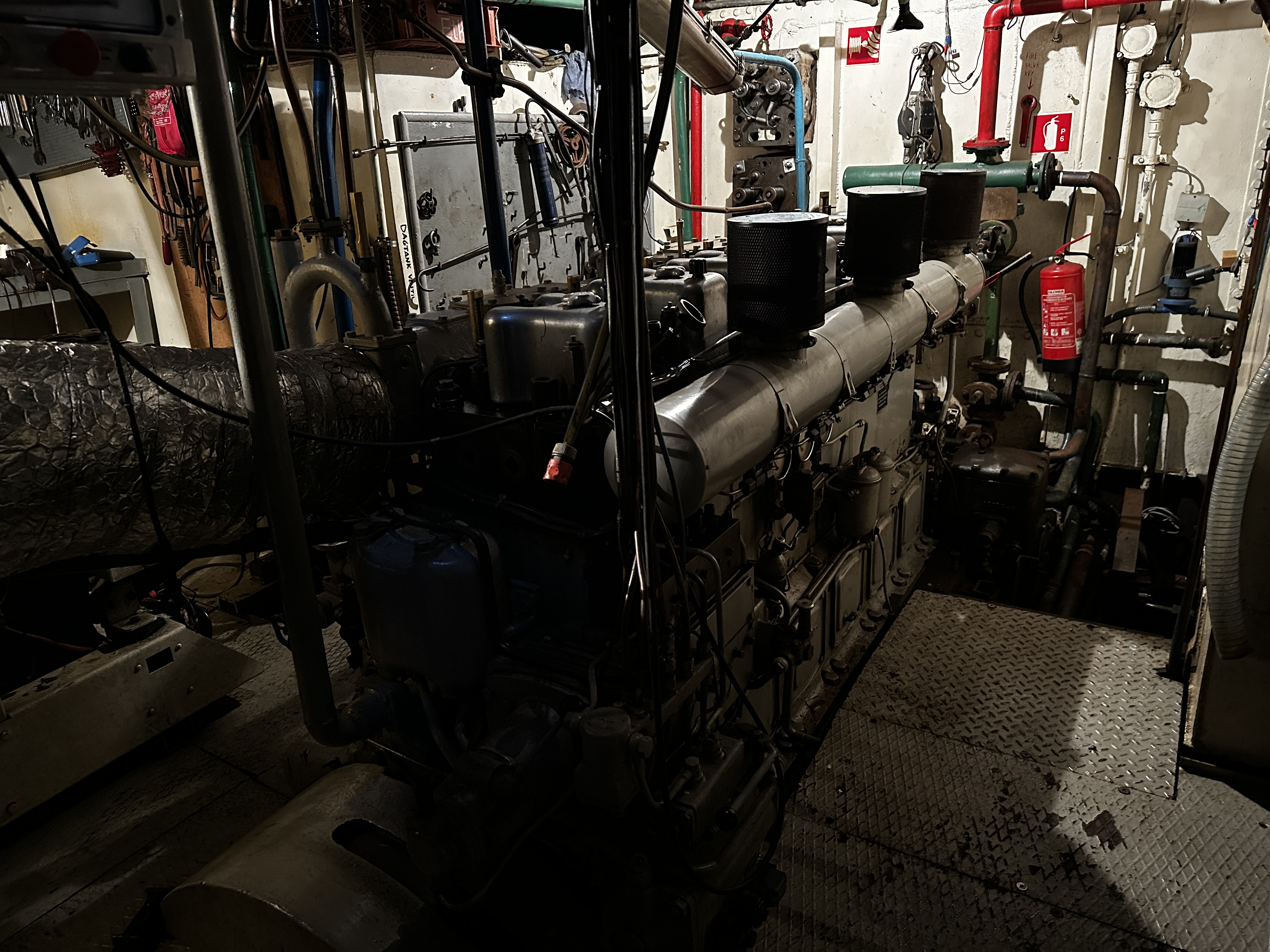
The Engine room on Artship

The vessel left Flensburg for London in May 2024. During its transit across the North Sea to the UK, the engine required emergency at-sea repairs following a cylinder liner failure. Following replating and structural repairs in Chatham, Kent in July 2025, the ship's hold was converted into a 400-capacity exhibition space.

As of December 2025, the ship is moored in Canary Wharf, London.
