= Slomó Köves =

Hungarian rabbi (born 1979)

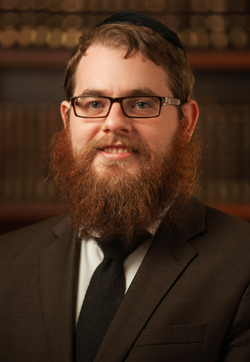
- Born: Máté Köves; 18 May 1979 (age 47); Budapest, Hungary
- Occupation: Rabbi
- Spouse: Devora Leah Oirechman
- Children: 5

Slomó Köves (born Máté Köves; 18 May 1979) is a leading Orthodox rabbi and chief rabbi of EMIH (Egységes Magyarországi Izraelita Hitközség) an affiliate of Chabad-Lubavitch in Hungary which is led by rabbi Báruch Oberlander.

Köves also serves as the chief Rabbi of the Hungarian Defense Forces

== Early life ==
Shlomo Köves was born in Budapest into a secular Jewish family. On his mother's side were several famous Orthodox rabbis, including Rabbi Shlomo Silberstein of Bonyhád and Rabbi Yeshaya Silberstein of Vác. Köves’ paternal grandmother, Rózsa Köves, was a well-known journalist at Magyar Nemzet. While growing up in communist Hungary, Köves did not receive a Jewish education until the age of 13, when he decided to study abroad. He spent nearly 10 years pursuing rabbinical studies at various yeshivot. Köves graduated from the Yeshiva High School (Pittsburgh, Pennsylvania), the Institut Superieur D’études Rabbiniques et Talmudiques and the Central Lubavitch Yeshivot (New York). He received a Ph.D. from the University of Debrecen, in history, in 2007.

Köves also became a certified sofer (Jewish scribe) and mohel (to perform Jewish circumcision).

After his return to Hungary in 2002, he attended the University of Debrecen, receiving his Ph.D. in the History of 19th Century Hungarian Jewry. His thesis, Zsidó szakadás (“Jewish Schism”), was published as a book by the Noran publishing house in 2009. His original thesis dealt with the rabbinical disputes of Hamburg (1818-1821) and Nagymihály (1865) and how these impacted Jews living in Hungary and Europe.

== Return to Hungary and Ordination ==
In 2001, Köves began teaching at Eötvös Loránd University in Budapest, at the Faculty of Hebrew Law; he also taught the Talmud at the Neolog Rabbinical Institute.

On January 7, 2003, Köves became the first Orthodox rabbi to be ordained in Hungary since the Holocaust. Mordechai Eliyahu, Chief Rabbi of the State of Israel; Yitzchak Yehuda Yaroslavsky, leader of the Israeli Chabad Rabbi Council; and Báruch Oberlander, head rabbi of the Chabad-Lubavich movement in Hungary, oversaw the ceremony. The event was widely covered in the media because of its historical significance; Ferenc Madl, President of Hungary at the time, also attended the event.

== Activity ==
Rabbi Köves has spearheaded Jewish education in Hungary, founding the Maimonides High School, Open University for Judaic Studies and the Ashkenazium, the Jewish Studies department at the Milton Friedman University. He also started the first Hungarian-language Daf Yomi Talmud class, which can be followed daily online.

Köves has been a leading figure in the fight against antisemitism and remembering the Holocaust. In 2009, Köves invited Nobel Peace Prize laureate Elie Wiesel to visit Budapest on the occasion of the 20th anniversary of the establishment of the Chabad-Lubavitch movement in Hungary. Wiesel, a Holocaust survivor, had not been back to the country on an official visit since being deported in 1944. The visit was historic, as Wiesel had said he would never make the trip.

The preservation of Jewish Heritage has been an important goal for both Köves and EMIH. Their work has been seen via the opening/reopening of synagogues and historic Jewish sites throughout Hungary. These include the opening of Keren Or synagogue in 2005; the nearly 200-year-old Grand Synagogue in Óbuda in 2010, unused since the Holocaust; and the Budavár Synagogue in Budapest's Castle District in 2018, built in the 14th century and unused since a 1686 pogrom. New synagogues/community centers were also opened in 2019 in Szentendre and Újlipótváros (ZSILIP). This last, situated on the bank of the Danube River in Budapest, is a symbolic location given that thousands of Jews were shot into the Danube in 1944 and 1945. The year of the opening marked the 30th anniversary of the Chabad-Lubavitch movement in Hungary, and two Torah scrolls were ceremoniously completed. After 80 years, Újbuda's synagogue was planned to officially reopen sometime in 2021.

On May 2, 2012 he was appointed by the Hungarian Minister of Defense at the time, Csaba Hende, as Chief Rabbi of the Hungarian Forces. Csaba Hende said he has high hopes for cooperation. "During my work over the past two years, I have met a very committed, noble-minded patriot in the person of Shlomo Koves," said the minister.

In 2015, the rabbi house in Mád was completed. The village of Mád is the starting point for the 150-kilometer “Trail of the Wonder-Working Rabbis” pilgrimage, which takes visitors through 10 towns, rich in Jewish history, in Hungary's Tokaj-Hegyalja region. Köves has been active in reigniting Jewish life in this area, where Jewish communities were left decimated after the Holocaust.

In 2014, Rabbi Köves helped find some 103 lost Hungarian Torah scrolls in Russia; the scrolls are presumed to have been stolen from Hungarian Jews, most of whom had been deported to Auschwitz 70 years earlier.

Also in 2017, Köves and Rabbi Baruch Oberlander published two books each with 19 segments of the Talmud that had been previously translated into Hungarian, the first-ever extensive translation of the Jewish sacred text. It was at this time that EMIH under Köves’ leadership also opened Hungary's first kosher slaughterhouse, one of Europe's largest. Csengele is “the only kosher slaughterhouse for geese in Europe” and provides kosher foie gras to countries around the world.

Rabbi Köves and EMIH have been active in charity via a number of ventures including the Olajág elderly homes and the Cedek soup kitchen, which provides 1,500 hot meals daily to those in need, as well as other assistance, from medical intervention to support for children's homes. In 2022, EMIH, in cooperation with the Federation of Jewish Communities of Ukraine, opened a kosher camp on the Lake Balaton to house hundreds of Jewish Ukrainian refugees.

== Opinions and controversies ==
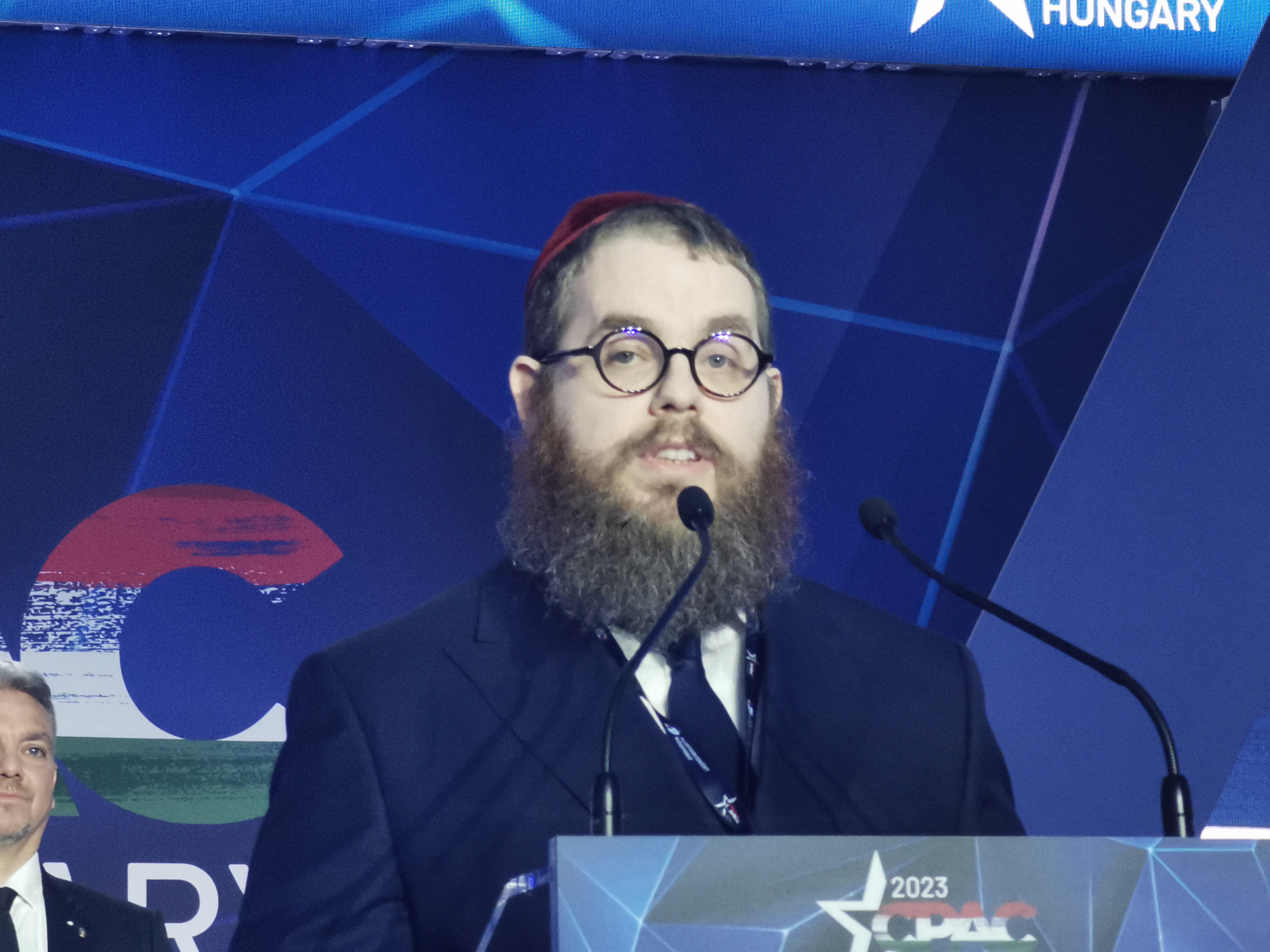
Köves Slomo in 2023

The rabbi is known for his emphasis on the importance of a positive Jewish identity based on Jewish religious heritage versus the so-called “Holocaust identity”. Köves has been attacked by the liberal, Neolog (Reform) Jewish community Mazsihisz for not being sensitive enough to the Holocaust and practicing "moral relativism". When the Orbán government unveiled a memorial to WWII victims in Budapest's Freedom Square, some Hungarian Jews were outraged and called for a boycott against the Hungarian government's planned Holocaust memorial events for what they saw as antisemitic whitewashing of Hungary's role in killing and deporting Jews. Köves, however, did not support the boycott; instead, he referred to the statute as “a sign of a confused national identity and a confused national narrative,” not as something directly antisemitic.

Köves and EMIH have actively taken on antisemitism in Hungarian society, including in politics, e.g., in the far-right party Jobbik.

Köves established the Action and Protection Foundation (Tett és Védelem Alapítvány or TEV) to fight antisemitism in a progressive way, based on legal reform, actual legislation and education. The center monitors and documents antisemitism both in Hungary and across Europe via monthly reports, has an antisemitism hotline, funds educational/justice initiatives and also hosts conferences to discuss “the future of Jews in Europe”.

One of TEV's most high-profile actions was going after the far-right portal kuruc.info. which Hungarian PM Viktor Orbán had called “a center of anti-Semitism in Hungary”. The site, however, was not using a server in Hungary but one in the U.S. and had been set up by a supposed Hungarian neo-Nazi supporter residing there, Bála Varga. Lawsuits against Varga, who threatened and harassed TEV for its efforts to shut him down, and an investigation by the FBI, sought to figure out who in Hungary was supporting the endeavor. An arrest warrant was eventually issued, but Varga had already fled to Canada. Partnering up with the Anti-Defamation League, TEV did succeed in getting Kuruc's Facebook page removed. The group was able to set another one up but with only a small fraction of its original followers.

Some believe TEV is not critical enough of some politically sensitive issues. For example, during the anti-Soros campaign of the Fidesz-run Hungarian government in 2017, due to the billionaire's support for immigration, Rabbi Köves called on Hungarian Jews to not get involved in the Soros debate. While Mazsihisz called out the posters that read “Don’t let Soros have the last laugh” as blatant antisemitism, EMIH emphasized that Soros’ politics and his Jewish identity should not be intertwined. The Israeli Foreign Ministry itself issued a statement admitting that “the Israeli government is often at odds with Soros” who “continuously undermines Israel’s democratically elected governments”.

Still, Köves openly criticized the Hungarian Prime Minister for stating in the summer of 2018 that Miklós Horthy was a statesman. However, he encountered further controversy regarding this issue upon saying that KDNP MP István Hollik had been helpful in renewing Jewish life in Hungary. The comment drew backlash as Hollik had spoken highly of Horthy and Köves had even appeared on Hollik's campaign flyer. Köves responded by saying that he looks to work with anyone open to a stronger Jewish community in Hungary and that he “maintains good relationships with many opposition MPs as well”. He also commented that he "regretted" if Hollik had called Horthy a statesman and repeated his previous condemnation of Orbán's similar words that summer: "In no way do I consider it acceptable for Horthy to be presented as a role model."

Still, the appearance of campaigning for a particular politician created confusion, as Köves is a proponent of the Jewish community not committing to any political party. Historically, Jews identified with the political Left in Hungary, a path that Neolog Mazsihisz has continued. Koves, however, has claimed that the Jewish community should be more politically independent. When the Hollik flyer appeared, Köves first claimed it was a mistake but then later said that it was actually good that a Christian right-wing politician was campaigning with a picture of an Orthodox rabbi; given the history of right-wing members being antisemitic, this was a perfect opportunity to fight against this trend.

Another major issue for Rabbi Köves has been promoting self-reliance in Jewish communities. Critics of EMIH have pointed out that it has become more of a “business church” than a religious organization. In one article, EMIH is painted as an “empire” built from state funds. However, whereas most places of worship in Hungary rely solely on state funds, EMIH also depends on creating business opportunities within its community and being able to support itself in this way as well while also fostering activity and livelihoods in its community.

Mazsihisz has further criticized EMIH for its visible presence in Hungary, saying that the group's public lighting of the menorah and ice skating event to celebrate Hannukah (open to all) as well as having a tent at the super-popular Sziget music festival will fuel antisemitism. Köves claims this is sadly just due to ignorance and that these activities serve to foster an understanding of Judaism by Jews and non-Jews alike and to reach out to those Jews who may be seeking to find out more about their religious heritage.

Orthodox versus modern Judaism has been another prominent arena for Köves, in which he strives to use all tools of modernity, be it a rock concert or traditional Jewish festival, to help the surrounding community better understand what Judaism stands for. Köves claims that all mediums should be used to propagate ancient Jewish values and promote a more positive view of Jews. This approach is based on the Chabad philosophy he follows, which emphasizes the joys of life and the reasons behind religious celebration.

Köves made headlines when far-right politician and former Jobbik vice-president Csanád Szegedi requested a meeting with the rabbi to discuss the discovery of his Jewish roots. Szegedi said he had apologized to his Jewish grandmother — a Holocaust survivor — for being one of the forces behind the highly antisemitic Jobbik and one of the loudest and most visible voices of its many hateful campaigns but “felt it was not enough”. As to Köves’ decision to meet Szegedi, the rabbi said he didn't “really have any choice” and took up the task of guiding Szegedi on some serious “soul work”, leading the former Jobbik politician to become, as The Times of Israel said, “a pariah in his own party”. Jobbik forced its former leader out, claiming it was not due to his Jewish identity but because he offered bribes to keep his heritage quiet.

Köves was attacked by Mazsihisz for both accepting Szegedi and then later for being suspicious of Jobbik's “switch” to a centrist party line (Szegedi had since left the party).

Köves maintains that Jobbik's past has made it a symbol of racism and antisemitism and they would have to do much more than simply say they had changed. There was further controversy when Köves essentially rejected Jobbik leader Gábor Vona's Hanukkah greeting in 2016. But as Hungarian Free Press aptly noted: "Mr. Vona is naive or perhaps overly optimistic to think that one Hanukkah greeting sent to Rabbi Köves would somehow erase years of antisemitism." The situation was not aided by one Jobbik chapter posting on Facebook that they support no one who would have such “a crazy idea”, that is, to send Hanukkah greetings.

== The House of Fates ==
The House of Fates project initiated originally by the Hungarian government in 2013 was meant to create a high-tech, memorable and thought-provoking experience for people looking to learn more about the Holocaust.

Although the building of the museum (approximately 100,000 square feet) was finished in 2015, the project came to a halt because of a controversy around the leading curator, Maria Schmidt, who according to some, was too politically involved and may have intended to whitewash Hungary's role in the holocaust and deportation of Hungarian Jews.

After many years of delay, Köves took over the project upon the request of the Hungarian government. Still, some falsely claimed that he was only covering up for Schmidt and the government's hidden political intentions.

Köves pushed back, stating that those causing an uproar are “criticizing content that doesn’t even exist yet” and asking critics, specifically head of Mazsihisz, Andras Heisler, to “put aside political agendas, community politics and his personal interests”.

The Daily Beast went so far as to call Schmidt “the leader of a movement to rewrite the Holocaust” and the museum itself a “revisionist Holocaust museum”. One commentary by a Yad Vashem historian in the Times of Israel called out what appeared to be attempts to make Hungarians appear “blameless” in “a grave falsification of history”.

Given the continued controversy and distraction from the important work at stake, Köves removed Schmidt from the project and appointed Yitzhak Mais, a well-known holocaust historian and museum specialist, who headed up the Yad Vashem museum between 1983 and 1995. Köves also hired the Washington-based Gallagher & Associates for the project; top Holocaust museologists were consulted and nearly 150 survivors and rescuers were interviewed.

Rabbi Köves has said he wants visitors to the museum to "get to know [Jews] not only as unfortunate victims, but also as survivors of thousands of years of values, as prominent figures in the modernization of Europe and Hungary". The exhibit is being built around five principles: historical context, emotional involvement of the viewer, an invitation to personally connect with the topic, the Jewish perspective, and modern language.

== Chabad takeover of MAOIH ==
In January 2021, the Autonomous Orthodox Jewish Community of Hungary (MAOIH) president Róbert Deutsch was elected to solve the dire financial situation of the MAOIH community. He asked the help of the Hungarian Chabad - Association of United Hungarian Jewish Congregations (EMIH), which is led by rabbi Báruch Oberlander. Rabbi Köves is the chief rabbi of EMIH. Rabbis Köves and Oberlander convinced Mr. Deutsch to appeal to the Hungarian government for a larger allocation of the government's annuity to the Jewish communities. The annuity is divided by affiliation. The total annual distribution is about six million dollars per year. Because the Autonomous Orthodox Jewish Community was disproportionately destroyed in the holocaust, they received much less than the larger Neolog (Mazsihisz) community, despite MAOIH being the most active Jewish community in Hungary.

The appeal to the Hungarian government was intended to succeed with a decision from Chief Rabbinate of Israel who decided that the Autonomous Orthodox Jewish Community of Hungary was to receive some of the funds that were going to the Neolog community.

However, the losing party, the Neolog, did not accept the authority of the Chief Rabbinate.

After this, under vague circumstances during the COVID-19 pandemic and during online meetings of the MAOIH, people unknown to the MAOIH community appeared on the list of MAOIH community members. They turned out to be the employees of the Chabad-affiliated slaughterhouse in Csengele, Hungary. Many of these new "community members" were not living in Hungary, and were total strangers to the community.

Despite a decision from the religious court of Israel, the beit din of the Eidah Charedit, disqualifying the new community members, the new Chabad-affiliated members defied this ruling and, during the turmoil caused by the pandemic, held a virtual assembly, where they overthrew Mr. Deutsch and appointed Gábor Keszler as president and Shmueil Oirechman as chief secretary of the community. Mr Oirechman is the brother-in-law of Rabbi Köves. The new Chabad-affiliated leadership, has taken over the MAOIH properties which include a synagogue, a study hall, a nursing home, a restaurant and an archives library. The property is valued about 30 million dollars. The new leadership has begun renovations and has not indicated if the MAOIH traditions, those of the Chatom Sofer, will be recognized. The former MAOIH leadership is engaging in legal efforts in the Jewish and Civil courts to disqualify the new leadership and to have the MAOIH properties returned to the former leadership and community members.

== Positions ==
2004–present: Chief Rabbi of the Association of Hungarian Jewish Communities (EMIH)

2010–present: Rabbi of Óbuda Synagogue

2012–present: Chief Jewish Chaplain of the Hungarian Defense Forces

== Personal life ==
Köves married his wife Devora Lea in 2001. They have lived in Budapest since 2002 and have five children together.

== Awards ==
2021 - Hungarian Order of Merit

== Works ==
- Oberlander Báruch–Köves Slomó: Zsidó jog és etika. (Jewish Law and Ethics) Studies on modern social issues; United Israelite Congregation of Hungary, Budapest, 2009
- Zsidó szakadás – Hamburgtól Nagymihályig (Jewish Schism – From Hamburg to Nagymihály). Jewish historical developments in Europe and Hungary in the light of the Hamburg Temple Disputes (1818-1820) and rabbinical dispute of Nagymihály (1865); Noran Libro, Budapest, 2009
- Talmud. Selected chapters, 1–2; Oberlander Báruch, Köves Slomó; EMIH–Chábád Lubavics Zsidó Nevelési és Oktatási Alapítvány, Budapest, 2017 (Classical Jewish works in Hungarian)
