= Unprecedented (miniseries) =

2022 American-British documentary television miniseries

- Genre: Documentary
- Directed by: Alex Holder
- Composer: Atli Örvarsson
- Countries of origin: United States; United Kingdom
- Original language: English
- No. of episodes: 3

Production
- Executive producers: Otto Albrecht; Ian Moffitt; Greg Sanderson
- Producers: Alex Holder; Michael Crommett; Marcos H. Azevedo; Maria B. Fernandez; Nicole Pritchett
- Cinematography: Michael Crommett
- Editors: Marcos H. Azevedo; James Cude
- Running time: 48–50 minutes
- Production companies: AJH Films; Rogo Productions; Zinc Media

Original release
- Network: Discovery+
- Release: July 10, 2022

Unprecedented is a 2022 American-British documentary television miniseries revolving around the 2020 United States presidential election, which premiered on July 10, 2022, on Discovery+.

== Plot ==
The documentary series includes previously unreleased footage of the Trump family on the campaign trail and their reactions to the outcome of the election. The Trumps did not request contractual right of control. It is said to offer intimate and unprecedented interviews with Trump, his family and others who were in the White House. The documentary series follows the last months of the presidency of Donald Trump. The series is shown in three parts and features interviews with President Donald Trump, Ivanka Trump, Donald Trump Jr., Jared Kushner, Eric Trump, and Vice President Mike Pence. Footage was recorded at the White House, at Trump's Mar-a-Lago residence, and events of the Trump's presidential re-election campaign.

The events of the attack on the United States Capitol on January 6, 2021, from the White House were filmed by Holder.

According to Holder, the idea behind the film was to find out who the Trumps were by way of the re-election campaign, and it ended up documenting the family’s “Succession-type vibe”.

== Interviewed ==
- Donald Trump, the 45th president of the United States
- Donald Trump Jr., the eldest child of Donald Trump
- Ivanka Trump, the first daughter of Donald Trump
- Eric Trump, the second son of Donald Trump
- Mike Pence, the 48th vice president of the United States
- Jared Kushner, a senior advisor to 45th U.S. president
- Anne Applebaum, a journalist and historian
- Peter Baker, a journalist and author
- Gwenda Blair, a biographer of Trump's family
- McKay Coppins, a journalist
- Marc Fisher, a senior editor for The Washington Post
- Eddie Glaude, an academic
- Tess Owen, a reporter
- Philip Rucker, a reporter
- Paola Ramos, a journalist

== Production ==
Holder worked on a movie about Donald Trump’s 2020 re-election campaign and the aftermath for about two years.

The footage was shot at the White House, Trump's Mar-a-Lago resort and on the campaign trail during the last months of the Trump presidency. It also includes a full view of the riot at the Capitol on January 6, 2021. It was recorded for the documentary series in the last weeks of 2020 and the first weeks of 2021.

== Release ==
The film was released in the United States on July 10, 2022. It premiered in Australia on July 11 and in Germany on July 15.

In interview to The Hollywood Reporter, the director mentioned he now has security guards:

On Monday of last week, I had 112 followers on Twitter, the majority of them were probably my family, and now there’s just under 40,000… People are talking about me on TV shows. Yeah, I mean, it’s obviously crazy and there’s obviously people who, without having seen the series, have come to a conclusion about my position.

== Episodes ==
No.	Title	Directed by	Original release date
1	"The Roar"	Alex Holder	July 10, 2022
2	"Chaos and Madness"	Alex Holder	July 10, 2022
3	"The Kindling"	Alex Holder	July 10, 2022

== Subpoenas ==
On June 15, 2022, Holder was subpoenaed by the United States House Select Committee on the January 6 Attack, for raw footage "from January 6", from "interviews from September 2020 to present with Donald Trump, Pence, Donald Trump Jr., Ivanka Trump, Eric Trump, and Jared Kushner", and "pertaining to discussions of election fraud or election integrity surrounding the November 2020 presidential election". Holder complied with a subpoena from the committee and testified behind closed doors. Holder also complied with a subpoena for Fulton County, Georgia's criminal investigation into Trump's attempts to overturn the election in Georgia.
