= Mynkivtsi, Kamianets-Podilskyi Raion, Khmelnytskyi Oblast =

Rural locality in Khmelmnytskyi Oblast, Ukraine

Mynkivtsi Миньківці
- Village
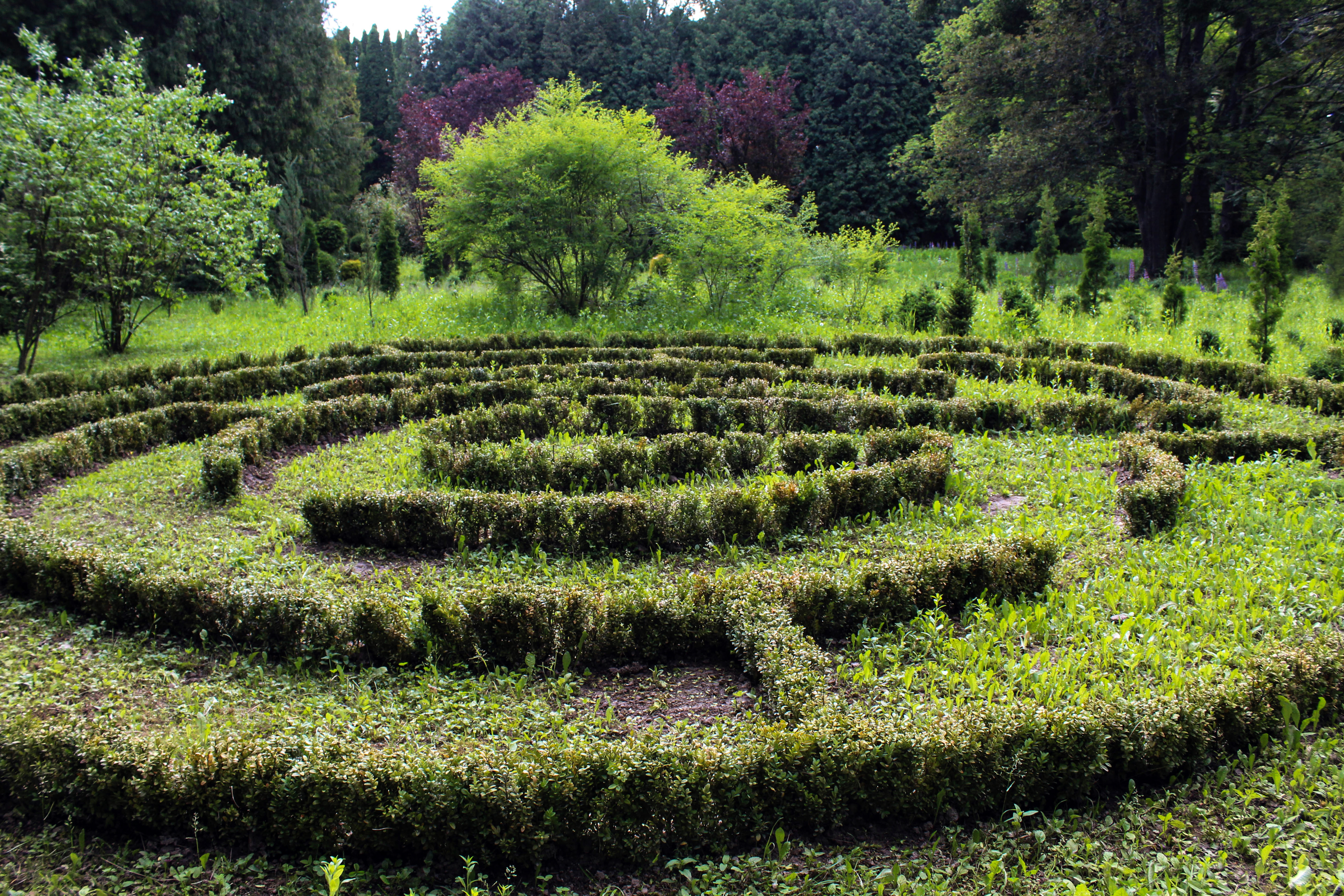

- Location within Ukraine
- Coordinates: 48°51′14″N 27°06′27″E
- Country: Ukraine
- Oblast: Khmelnytskyi Oblast
- Raion: Kamianets-Podilskyi Raion
- Hromada: Dunaivtsi urban hromada
- Established: 1922

Area
  - Total: 4.184 km^{2} (1.615 sq mi)
  - Land: 49,444 km^{2} (19,090 sq mi)
- Elevation: 177 m (581 ft)

Population (2015)
  - Total: ▼1,479
  - Density: 29.91/km^{2} (77.5/sq mi)
- Time zone: UTC+2 (EET)
  - Summer (DST): UTC+3 (EEST)
- Postal code: 32463
- Area code: +380-3858

Mynkivtsi (Ukrainian: Миньківці, Russian: Миньковцы, Polish: Minkowce) is a selo in Kamianets-Podilskyi Raion, Khmelnytskyi Oblast (province), Ukraine. The village is located on the river Ushytsya, 43 km away from the railway station Dunaivtsi and 89 km away from Khmelnytskyi. Mynkivtsi belongs to Dunaivtsi urban hromada, one of the hromadas of Ukraine. Its population was 1,479 inhabitants in 2015.

Until 18 July 2020, Mynkivtsi belonged to Dunaivtsi Raion. The raion was abolished in July 2020 as part of the administrative reform of Ukraine, which reduced the number of raions of Khmelnytskyi Oblast to three. The area of Dunaivtsi Raion was merged into Kamianets-Podilskyi Raion.
