= Thomas Oliver =

Thomas or Tom Oliver may refer to:

- Thomas Oliver (architect) (1791–1857), classical architect active in Newcastle upon Tyne, England
- Thomas Oliver (Canadian politician) (1821–1880), Canadian businessman and political figure
- Thomas Oliver (engineer), engineer who invented the first machine for forging bolts in England
- Thomas Oliver (farmer) (died 1991), IRA murder victim
- Thomas Oliver (lieutenant governor) (1733–1815), last Royal Lieutenant-Governor of Massachusetts
- Thomas Oliver (logician) (died 1624), English logician writing at the end of the 16th century
- Thomas Oliver (physician) (1853–1946), Scottish physician and industrial hygienist
- Thomas Oliver (religious writer) (1871–1946), teacher, magazine editor, author and wool expert
- Thomas Oliver (Salem witch trials) (1601–1679), husband of Bridget Bishop, victim of the Salem witchcraft trials
- Thomas Oliver (Vermont politician), state legislator
- Thomas Oliver (1852–1909), Canadian/American typewriter inventor; see Oliver Typewriter Company
- Tom Oliver (baseball) (1903–1988), center fielder for the Boston Red Sox
- Tom Oliver (born 1938), English actor
- Tom Oliver (Big Brother), contestant on Big Brother 2009 (UK)
- Tommy Oliver, fictional character in Power Rangers

== See also ==
- Tom Olliver (1812–1874), English jockey and racehorse trainer
- Thomas Olivers (1725–1799), Welsh preacher and hymn-writer
- Stantley Thomas-Oliver, American football cornerback
- Tom Olivar (born 1963), Philippine film and television actor
