= Providence Chapel =

Providence Chapel can refer to:

- Providence Chapel, Black Country Living Museum
- Providence Chapel, Charlwood, former Nonconformist place of worship.
- Providence Chapel, Hadlow Down, former Calvinistic Baptist place of worship.
