= Peacock (narrowboat) =

British narrowboat built in 1915

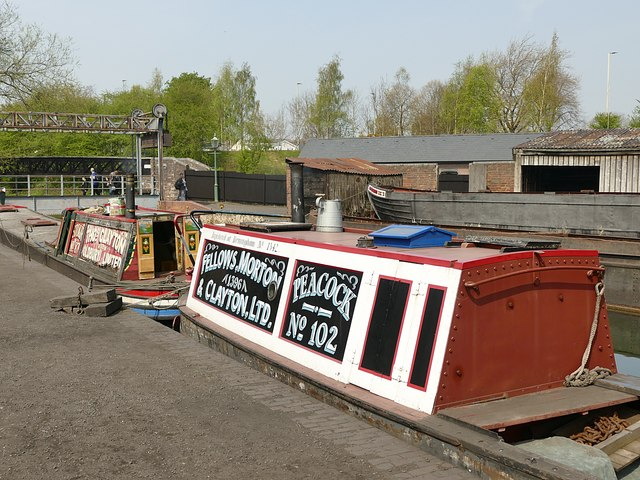
- Peacock at the Black Country Living Museum

History

United Kingdom
- Name: Peacock
- Owner: Fellows Morton & Clayton (1915-1948); Birmingham Museums Trust (1993-present)
- Builder: Fellows Morton & Clayton, Saltley Dock, Birmingham
- In service: 1915
- Reclassified: Tugboat/Houseboat (1952-1993)
- Status: Museum ship

General characteristics
- Class & type: Flyboat
- Type: Narrowboat
- Length: 69.97 ft (21.33 m) o/a
- Beam: 6.98 ft (2.13 m)
- Depth: 2.98 ft (0.91 m)
- Propulsion: 15hp Bolinder petrol engine

Peacock is a British narrowboat. She was built as a flyboat for Fellows Morton & Clayton (FMC) at Saltley, Birmingham in 1915, as fleet number 102. FMC had been using a fleet of steam fly boats (including President) since 1889, but in 1912 introduced motor boats such as Peacock into their fleet. 'Fly' boats work day and night non-stop, and with an all-male crew the cabins were more spartan than those of long distance family crewed boats.

Peacock worked with FMC's northern fleet until nationalisation in 1948. She was then sold and used as a tug and a houseboat between 1952 and 1993 when she was bought by the Birmingham Museum of Science and Industry, part of the Birmingham Museums Trust. Peacock has been described as being in the most original condition of any of the FMC boats: never converted or altered, she still has most of the original fittings. The current engine dates from the 1920s and is a 15 hp Bolinder.

Peacock is on loan to the Black Country Living Museum, where she can be seen dockside at the Black Country Living Museum boat dock, in the Lord Ward's Canal Arm at Dudley.

Peacock is registered by National Historic Ships as part of the National Historic Fleet.
