= North Star (narrowboat) =

North Star is a derelict wooden horse-drawn icebreaker built in 1868 and was used to clear a way through the ice when the canals were frozen. She is registered with National Historic Ships UK with certificate no 1963 She was built at Ocker Hill by the Birmingham Canal Navigations Company as North Star. She was then sold in 1904 to the Stourbridge Canal Company where she acquired the name Samson. In 1940 she moved to Walsall where she worked until 1962. In 1967 she was converted to a pleasure boat and kept as such until 1987.

It is now owned by the Black Country Living Museum, where it is based and can be seen dockside in the Lord Ward's Canal Arm at the Black Country Living Museum in Dudley.
