= Bessie (narrowboat) =

Narrowboat in the West Country Living Museum, England

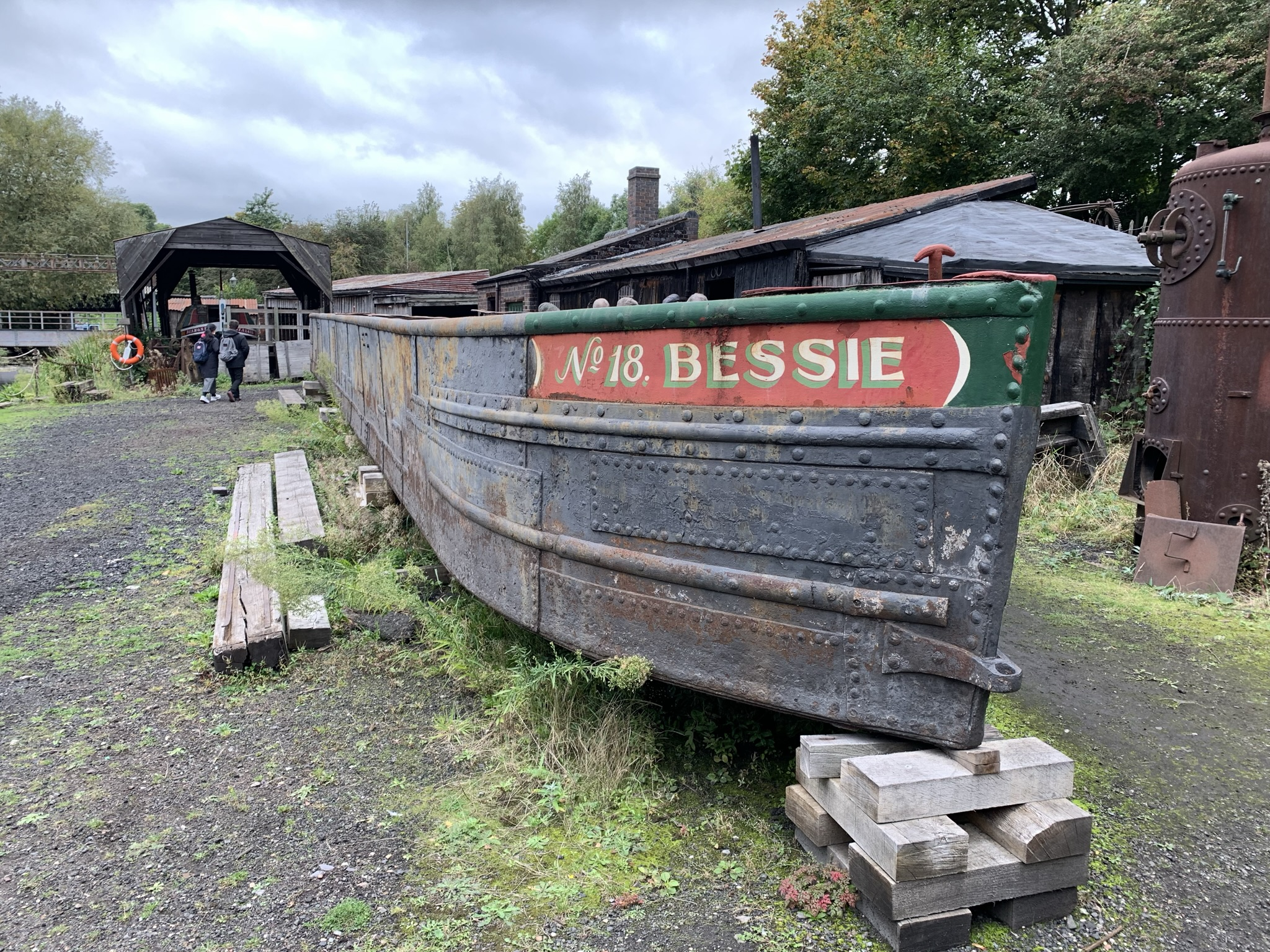
Historic narrowboat Bessie at the Black Country Living Museum

Bessie is a historic, single ended riveted iron day boat, built in 1895 for the Hartshill Iron Company. It is now owned by the Black Country Living Museum, Dudley, West Midlands, England, where it is based.

These open 'day' boats worked short distances carrying bulk cargoes such as coal and iron ore. The name refers to the short journey, where the crew would take the boat to its destination and then swap to another, empty boat to sail home the same day. Though often referred to as a 'Joey', a Joey was a double prow ended vessel that moved the rudder from one end to the other, so it didn't need to be turned around in a congested canal Although most working boats at the time were wooden, larger firms used riveted iron boats like this one as though more expensive to build they lasted longer. From the 1930s Bessie was used by Stewarts & Lloyds tube works in Halesowen.

It is now owned by the Black Country Living Museum, where it is based and can be seen dockside in the Lord Ward's Canal Arm at the museum.
