= Birchills (narrowboat) =

British canal boat

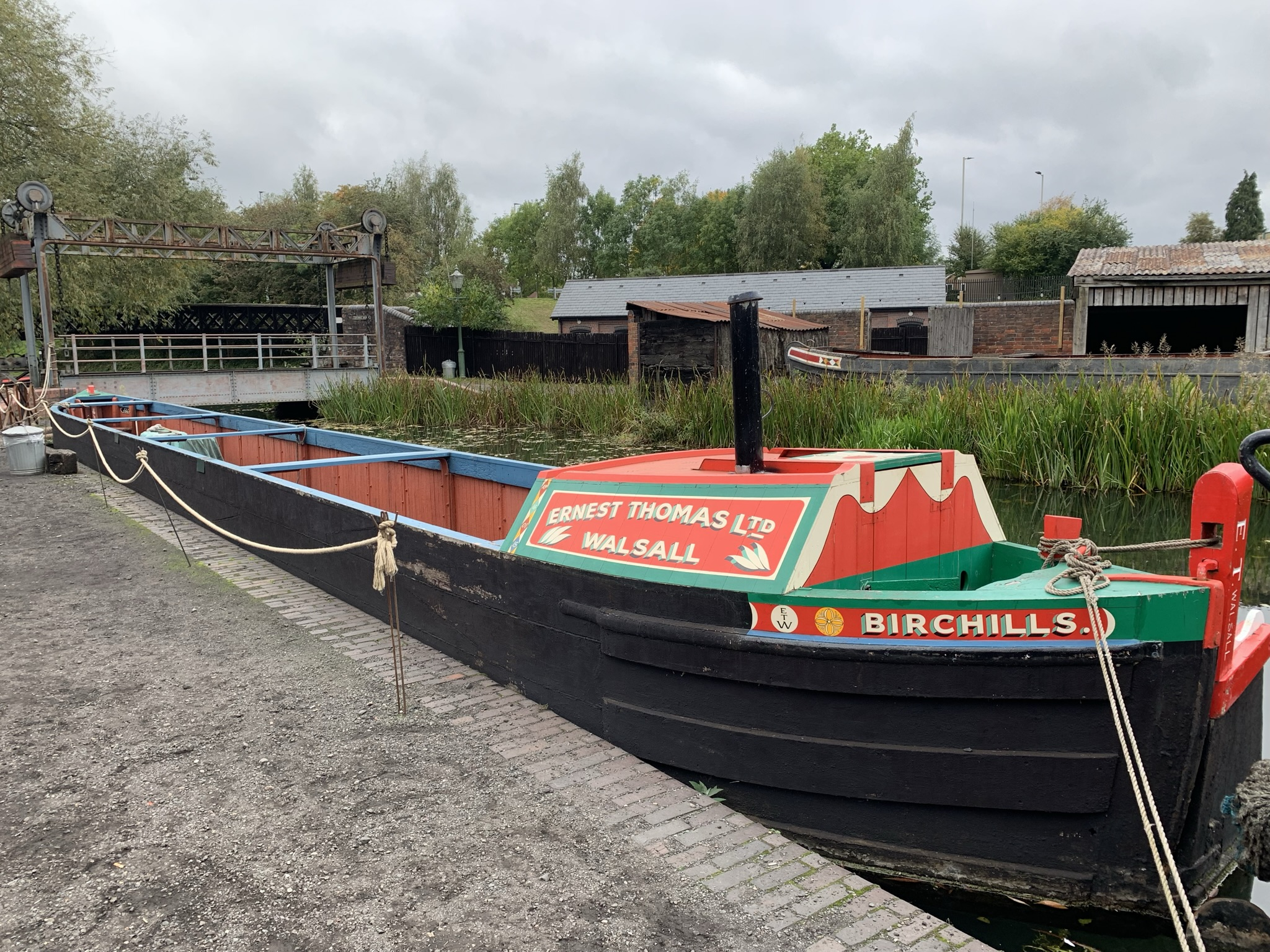
Historic narrowboat Birchills at the Black Country Living Museum

Birchills is a historic, ‘Joey’ boat with a small day cabin, built in 1953 by Ernest Thomas of Walsall. Birchills was one of the last wooden day boats made and was used to carry coal to Birchills Power Station and Wolverhampton Power Station. It is the only surviving 'Joey' with a day cabin.

This boat is double-ended and the mast and rudder could be changed from one end to the other which enabled its use in narrow canals or basins where there was no room to turn the boat around.

It is now owned by the Black Country Living Museum in Dudley, where it is based and can be seen dockside in the Lord Ward's Canal Arm. Birchills underwent major restoration in early 2015 following £62,000 worth of donations. Donations were received from the Headley Trust, the PRISM (Preservation for Industrial and Scientific Materials) Fund, the William A Cadbury Charitable Trust, the Rowland Trust and members of the public.
