= Eustace (narrowboat) =

Eustace is an historic narrow boat. It was built for the Wolverhampton-based company Thomas Bantock & Co. for railway transhipment work in the English Black Country. In the 1950s a cabin was added and Alfred Matty & Co of Deepfields, Coseley converted the hull to a spoon dredger for canal clearance work. Following a fire it was cut up but the fore end of the boat is now owned by the Black Country Living Museum where it can be seen on the path at the rear of the boat dock. The boat is a rare survivor of a type of construction unique to Thomas Bantock & Co. As of March 2013 it was shortly due to be restored.
