= Gregory's General Store =

Coordinates: 52°31′22.78″N 2°4′37.57″W

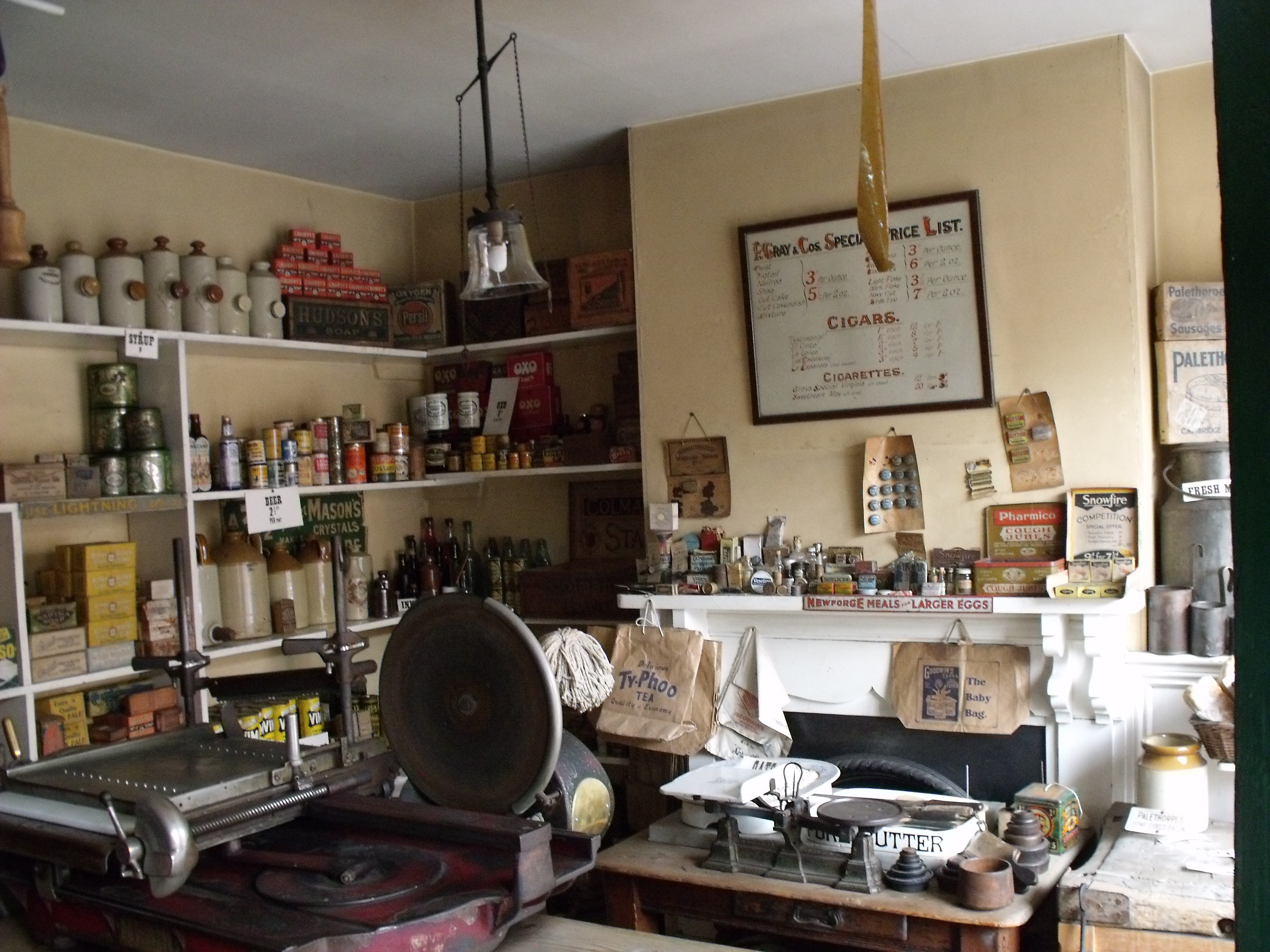
Inside the store

Gregory's General Store is an exhibit at the Black Country Living Museum. It once occupied numbers 89 & 90 Lawrence Lane, Old Hill, and was rebuilt on the museum site in 1980. It is set as it would have been in 1925.

== History ==
Gregory's was originally a pair of houses built on Lawrence Lane, Old Hill, in 1883 by Charles Gregory, an iron worker. In the early 1900s the houses were converted to a double fronted shop with living accommodation up stairs for the family. The two houses were originally separated by a central tunnel or 'entry' to the back garden.

When it operated as a general store, Gregory's held a wide variety of stock, meat and fresh produce. This was served from the right hand counter, and included; bacon, ham, beef suet, butter, cheese, eggs, homemade faggots, tripe and cow heel. The left hand counter sold various other items including sweets, cigarettes, clothes, hats and haberdashery items. The middle counter sold groceries and green grocery, however most of the fruit and vegetables would have been displayed outside the shop. Fruit and vegetable would have been available on a seasonal basis, and not all fruit and veg would be available all the time like we are used to today. Gregory's General Store catered for those on low wages, often allowing eggs to be sold individually and half loaves to be brought. Common essential items like tea, paraffin and butter would be sold by the penny's worth. Mrs Gregory also allowed customers to have items on the tick, meaning that she would give them the items on the basis that they would pay her when they received their wages. She would write what each customer owed in a book and tick their names off after they had paid her, hence the phrase 'on the tick'.
