= Black Country Living Museum boat dock =

Coordinates: 52.52309°N 2.07761°W

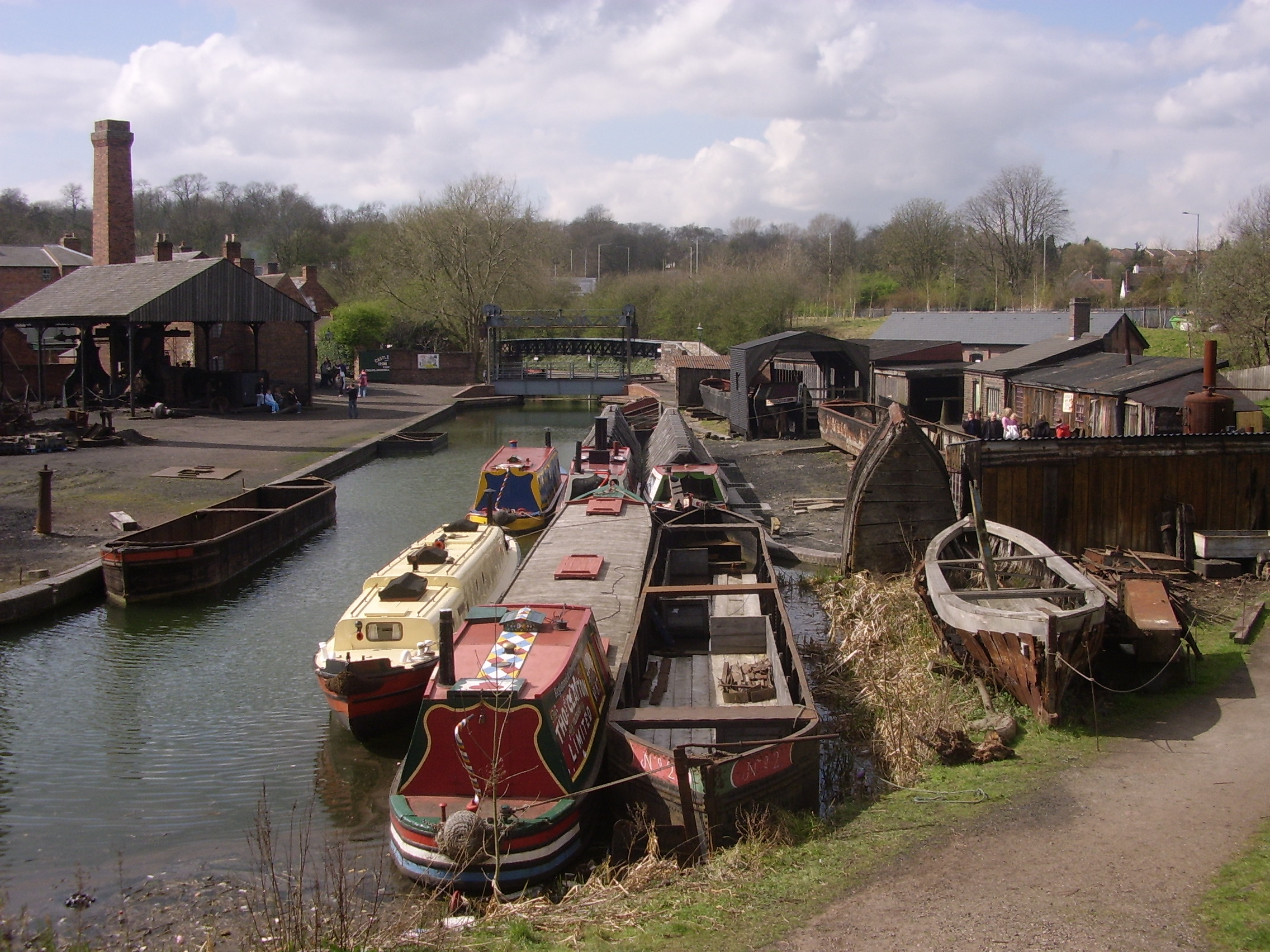
The boat dock

The boat dock at the Black Country Living Museum was built in 1976. Like many boat docks in the region its buildings are made out of recycled boat timbers from derelict wooden boats. The thousands of boats that used to work the Black Country canals all needed constant maintenance.

In this area there were many working boat yards, or docks, like this one, where boats were built and repaired. They were busy, cluttered places not unlike a modern scrap yard as it was common practice to break wooden boats, salvaging the ironwork.

Castlefields boat dock is typical of the many on the Black Country canal system of the period and is equipped to build new working craft and to repair those of iron or composite construction. The dock can accommodate three boats, drawn sideways out of the water by winches onto the slip. There are a number of different buildings on the boat dock each serving a specific purpose.

== Structures ==
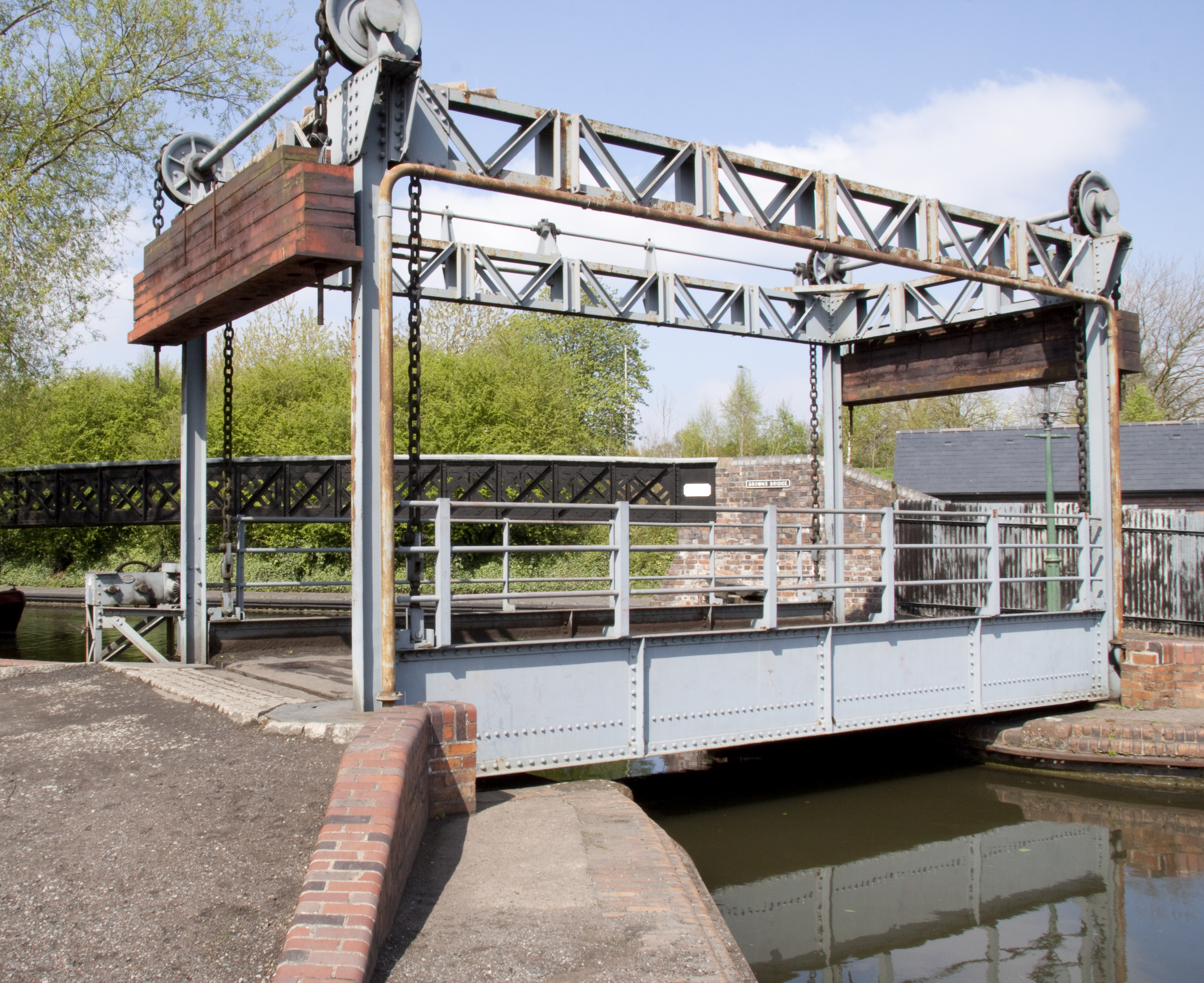
Lifting bridge at the dock

Based on an 1880s design the blacksmith shop would have wrought all the supplies needed for boat repair such as specialist nails and bolts and the L-shaped boat 'knees' used to reinforce the boat structure. Some blacksmiths worked as farriers who made and fitted horseshoes for the canal's working horses.

Next to the blacksmiths shop is a series of sheds, the first is made out of the bottom of a recycled boat (see picture). The sheds consist of a nail store and a rivet store which includes a carpenter's bench [sic] and cast-iron stove. At the end of the row is a paint store which would have held all the essentials used in boat painting like red lead, pigments and varnishes. There is also a tackle store with a corrugated roof which would have housed lifting tackle and other boat handling equipment.

The boat dock also featured a toilet (earth closet) and a stable to house the working horses. Horses provided "hosmuck an' tar" (manure and tar) that was used to seal the wooden boats.
