= Diamond (narrowboat) =

Diamond was built by John Crichton & Co. of Saltney, Chester for Midland and Coast Canal Carrying Company of Wolverhampton. The boat was built in Chester in 1927 and first registered at Wolverhampton in 1928. She was one of six iron boats in the fleet fitted with two cabins for long-distance traffic between the Black Country and the ports on the Mersey Estuary. Having been damaged during an air raid on Birmingham in 1944 she was sold for scrap to Ernest Thomas by Fellows, Morton & Clayton who had by then acquired Midlands and Coast. Rebuilt and renamed ‘Henry’ she carried coal until the 1960s when she was resold to ‘Caggy’ Stevens of Oldbury and renamed ‘Susan’. It is now owned by the Black Country Living Museum, where it is based and can be seen dockside in the Lord Ward's Canal Arm at the Black Country Living Museum in Dudley. Diamond is on the National Historic Ships register.
