= Black Country Living Museum Pawnbrokers Shop =

Coordinates: 52°31′23.1″N 2°4′36.81″W

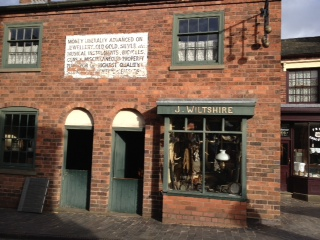
Outside of pawnbrokers shop at Black Country Living Museum

The Black Country Living Museum Pawnbrokers Shop is a recreation of a pawnbroker's at the Black Country Living Museum. It is one of a pair of cottages built in the 1840s, from School Lane in Himley.

The pair of cottages from School Lane in Himley originally operated as a corner shop. The setting of the display was designed to represent a small scale business. The shop takes its name from a well known Black Country pawnbroker, Joseph Wiltshire, who owned shops in Great Bridge, Wolverhampton and Carter's Green in West Bromwich. The exhibition combines pawnbroking with retail, as did many pawnbroking businesses in the 19th century. In the museum's reconstruction the unredeemed goods and other stock are sold in the front room, while pawning of goods was done in the 'pledge room' at the back.

The shop window of the Pawnbroker's gives an example of the types of goods that customers would 'pledge'. The display includes shoes, clothes, furs, musical instruments, children's toys and a set of false teeth.

== Historical context ==
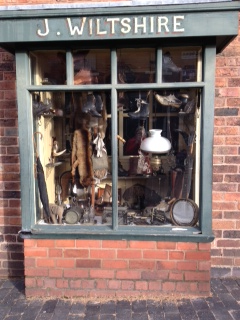
Window of pawnbrokers shop at Black Country Living Museum

Pawnshops prospered in areas where the wages were low and unstable. In the Black Country in 1870 there were 160 pawnbrokers in the area, Walsall had 15 and Wednesbury had 48. For a housewife with a large family to look after it was a constant struggle to make ends meet. It was not uncommon for a family to have linen or clothes that they would pawn as a bridging loan until next payday. The struggling family could pawn their goods on a Monday and could buy them back the following Friday or Saturday. The items pawned were taken as security for a loan, the value of the item was based on what the pawnbroker thought he would get if he sold the item on. In return the customer would receive the loan a ticket. To redeem their pledge the customer had to pay the loan back in full plus any charges this included the valuation of their items and the cost of the ticket.

Pawnbrokers in the Black Country needed to be where the people were. Some of these businesses started in public houses, which were frequently visited and saved customers a trip into town. Other Pawnbrokers operated out of converted houses in prominent positions like corner shops.
