= Brockmoor Carters Yard =

Brockmoor Carters Yard is a yard and stable at the Black Country Living Museum. It was originally located at Ogley Hay Road Burntwood, Cannock, having been built around 1900. It was dismantled and brought to the museum in the 1990s.

== History ==
Horses were key for transport in the Black Country; they also pulled trams, coaches, milk floats, coal carts, canal boats and fire engines. Industry made the Black Country but horses kept it moving.

Horses would have been stabled close to their trade in a yard. The Carters Yard at the Black Country Living Museum is a prime example. The Carters Yard contains a stable carefully dismantled and moved from Burntwood, Cannock. It stood in the backyard of a cottage in Ogley Hay Road and was probably built in 1900. The building was donated to the museum in the 1990s. The stable fittings were from a coach house and stable which was located in Handsworth Wood Road, Birmingham.

With the advent of the motorcar and petrol engine lorries, horse transport declined. Despite this decline, horses still remained at work well into the twentieth century. Some railways, like Willenhall maintained their horse and waggon deliveries into the late 1940s.

== Horses and the Titanic anchor ==
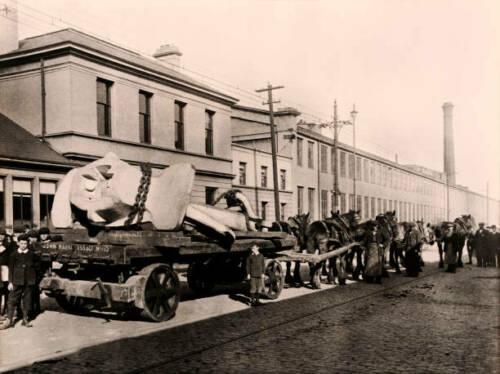
Transport of the anchor in Belfast

Up to 20 horses pulled the anchor for the Titanic. A stockless anchor was made in May 1911 at Noah Hingley’s works in Netherton according to the Hall's patent of 1910. The anchor, weighed 16 tons, and was delivered to the railway yard at Netherton from where it was to continue the rest of its journey to the shipyards in Belfast. Hingley’s used 6 of its own horses - massive animals weighing over a ton in weight the equivalent to a shire horse. The anchor is still attached to the wrecked ship under the sea.

== Other information ==
- If the load is on a 2-wheeled cart, it iss about 1.5 times its own weight
- If the load is on a 4-wheeled cart, it is 2 times its own weight
- If the load is on water, it is about 10 times its own weight
