= Emile Doo's Chemist Shop =

Historical exhibition

Coordinates: 52°31′23.2″N 2°4′37.86″W

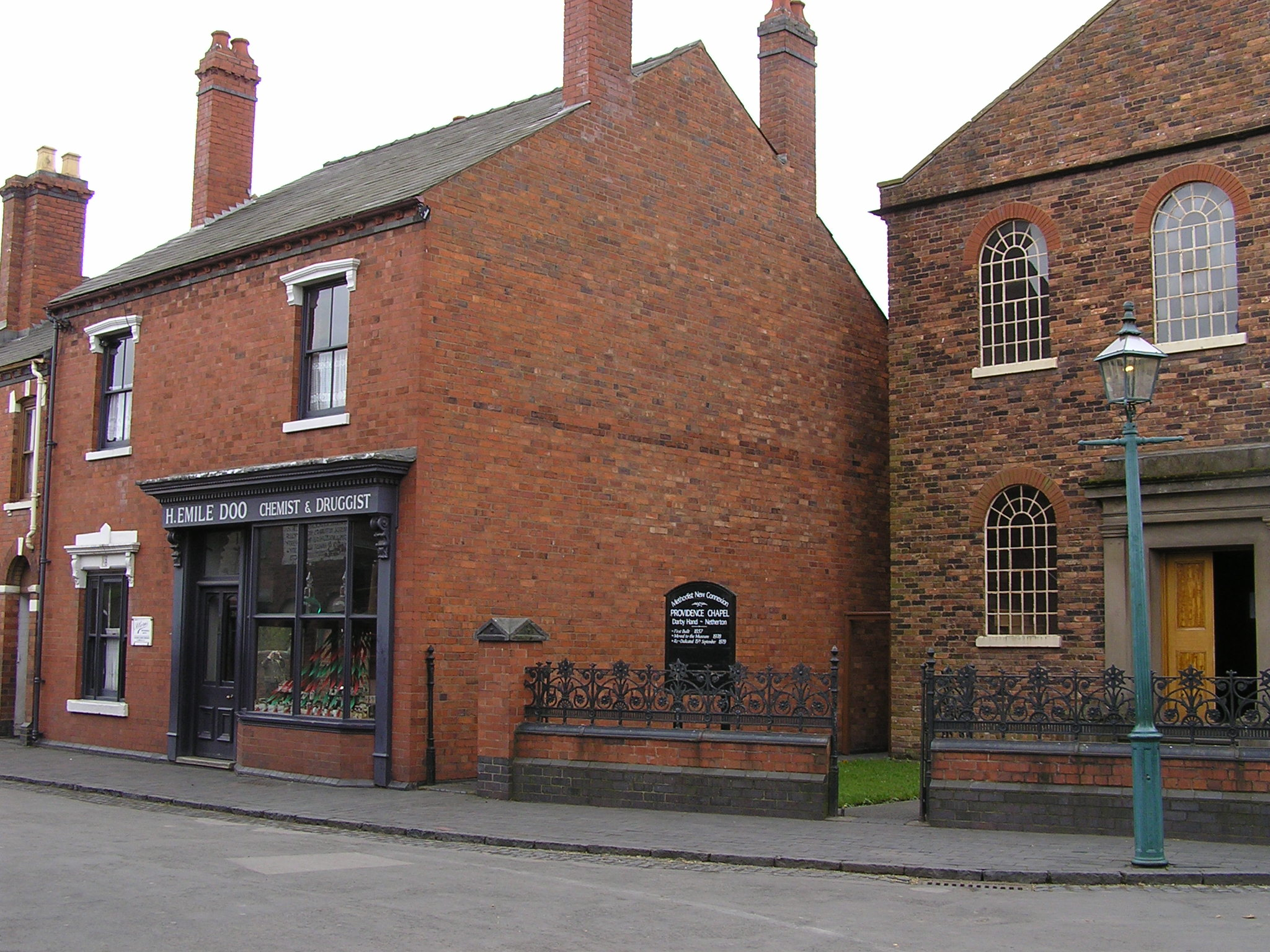
Shop exterior, and the chapel next door

Emile Doo's Chemist Shop is an exhibition at the Black Country Living Museum in England. It was originally situated at 358 Halesowen Road, Netherton, before being rebuilt on the museum site.

== History ==
Before the National Health Service was formed, local chemist shops like Doo's played an important part in the health of the local community. They offered services such as free medical advice, basic First Aid and weekly weighing of babies.

Doo's was originally built in 1886 as a tailor's shop. James Emile Doo traded from 1882 in a building across the road from 358, the business being taken over by his newly qualified son Harold Emile Doo, in about 1918. In 1929 Harold moved trading to their new premises at 358. The move was so carefully planned that dispensing was carried out until 10:00 p.m. on Saturday night in the old premises, and then started trading in the new premises the next morning at 9:00 a.m. Harold traded as a chemist until ill health forced his retirement in May 1968.

== Exhibition ==
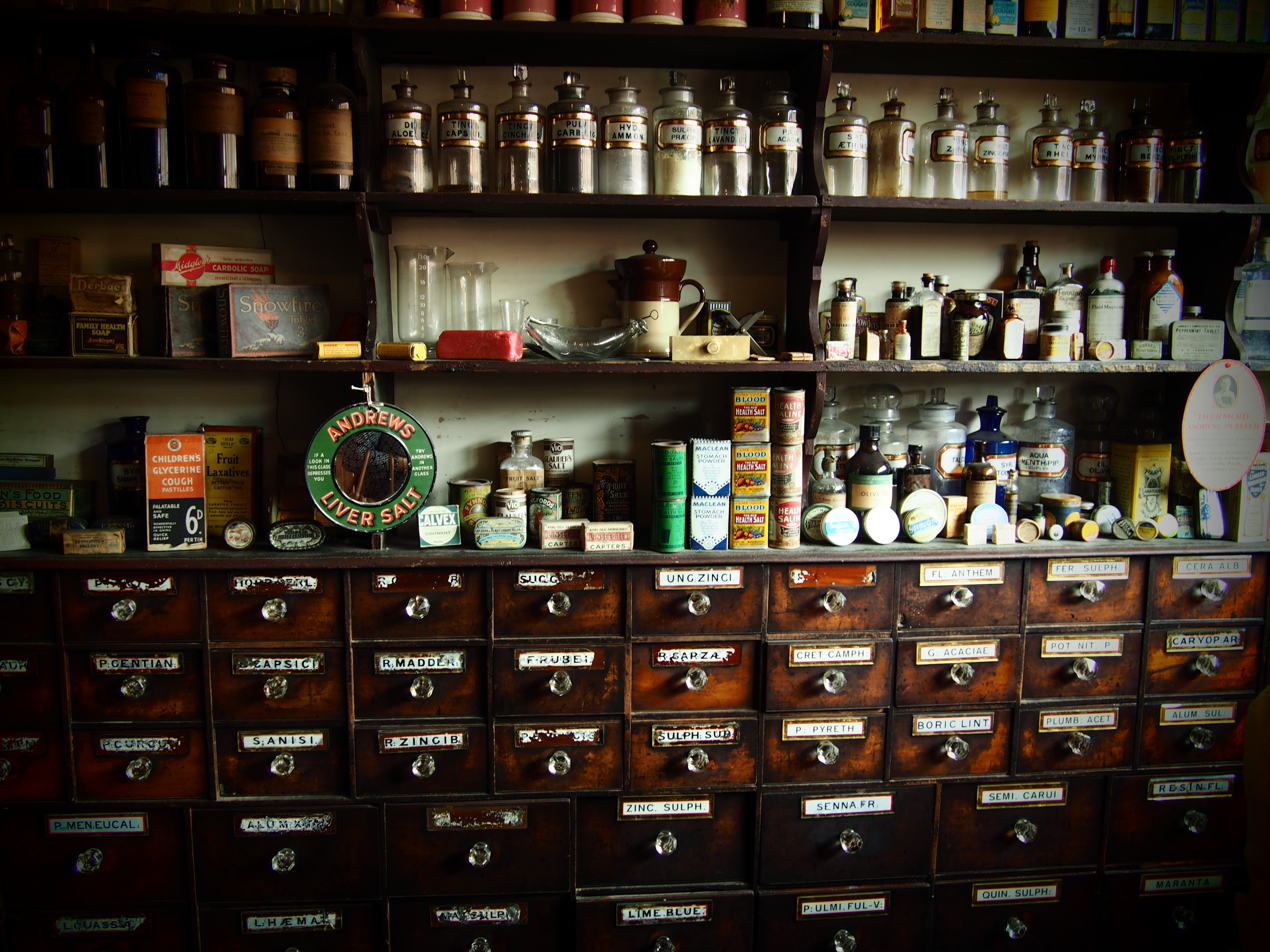
Shop interior

The shop lay untouched from 1968 to 1973, when the fittings and stock were donated to The Black Country Living Museum. The shop now located in The Black Country Living Museum is built using bricks reclaimed from two houses which were demolished in Pearson Street, Old Hill. The original shop front was also rescued and forms part of the exhibit today. The shop exhibition is much tidier than the shop would have been in real life. It would have been cluttered with hampers full of deliveries often leaving little room for customers.

With guidance from Emile Doo's daughter Betty, the shop has been laid out as it was shortly after the move across the road in 1929.

=== Items on display ===
==== Wafer machine ====
This was used for making thin soluble wafers for customers who needed medication dissolved in water. The prescribed ingredients were mixed to a paste with a binding agent and milk sugar. The mixture was then smeared over the top plate, which was flipped up so the wafers would slide into the bottom tray and could be dispensed via the extended section at the corner.

==== Paper folder ====
Before pills and tablets became widespread, prescribed medicine was mainly dispensed in the form of powders.

The practice continued in this century for things such as headache powders and infant teething powders. The ingredients were mixed together in a mortar and then individually wrapped in separate doses. The paper squares in which the powders were folded all had to be folded to the same dimensions so that they would fit neatly together into a box for the customer. The width of the paper could be adjusted using the ratchet mechanism on the side. The dose of powder was placed in the middle of a rectangular piece of white demi paper. The two edges were folded over to the width of the box, and then the paper strip was pressed over the folder to form two sharp creases. The two ends were brought together and one end pushed into the other forming a secure package. The folded doses were then put in a box or tied together to form a neat bundle.

==== Suppository mould ====
The ingredients for the suppositories were melted into a base of cocoa butter or glycerine, and the mixture was brought to the boil and poured into the moulds. When the preparation was set (after about 30 minutes in cool weather) the two halves were unscrewed to release the suppositories.

==== Emile Doo ====
Known locally as Jack, he was a well-known figure in Netherton, both through his work at The Chemist, and also for his involvement in amateur theatricals. He was a member of The 'Blue and Whites', a Pierrot troupe and did make up for other groups.

In the main, his life was dominated by the shop which was a focal point for local residents who needed minor treatment but could not afford doctors' fees. He had a considerable reputation for his own remedies. People came from far and wide to visit the shop. If you lived too far away to visit the shop, you could have your medicine delivered by post. He kept a book with all his remedies listed in, which his daughter still keeps today.

He qualified as a pharmacist in 1908. When he took the exam there were 133 candidates. 95 failed, with only 38 candidates achieving a pass. His certificate, and his father's, are on display.

Mr Doo suffered badly from arthritis, so could not move around easily. This may help explain why there was so much untouched stock in the cellar of the shop.

Locals who remember him, described him as a white haired gentleman who whistled constantly through his teeth as he worked in the shop.

His dog Pip was a character too. The dog would come along to visit him during opening hours, having travelled alone by tram from Kinver to reach the shop.
