= Stour (narrowboat) =

Canal boat at the Black Country Living Museum, England

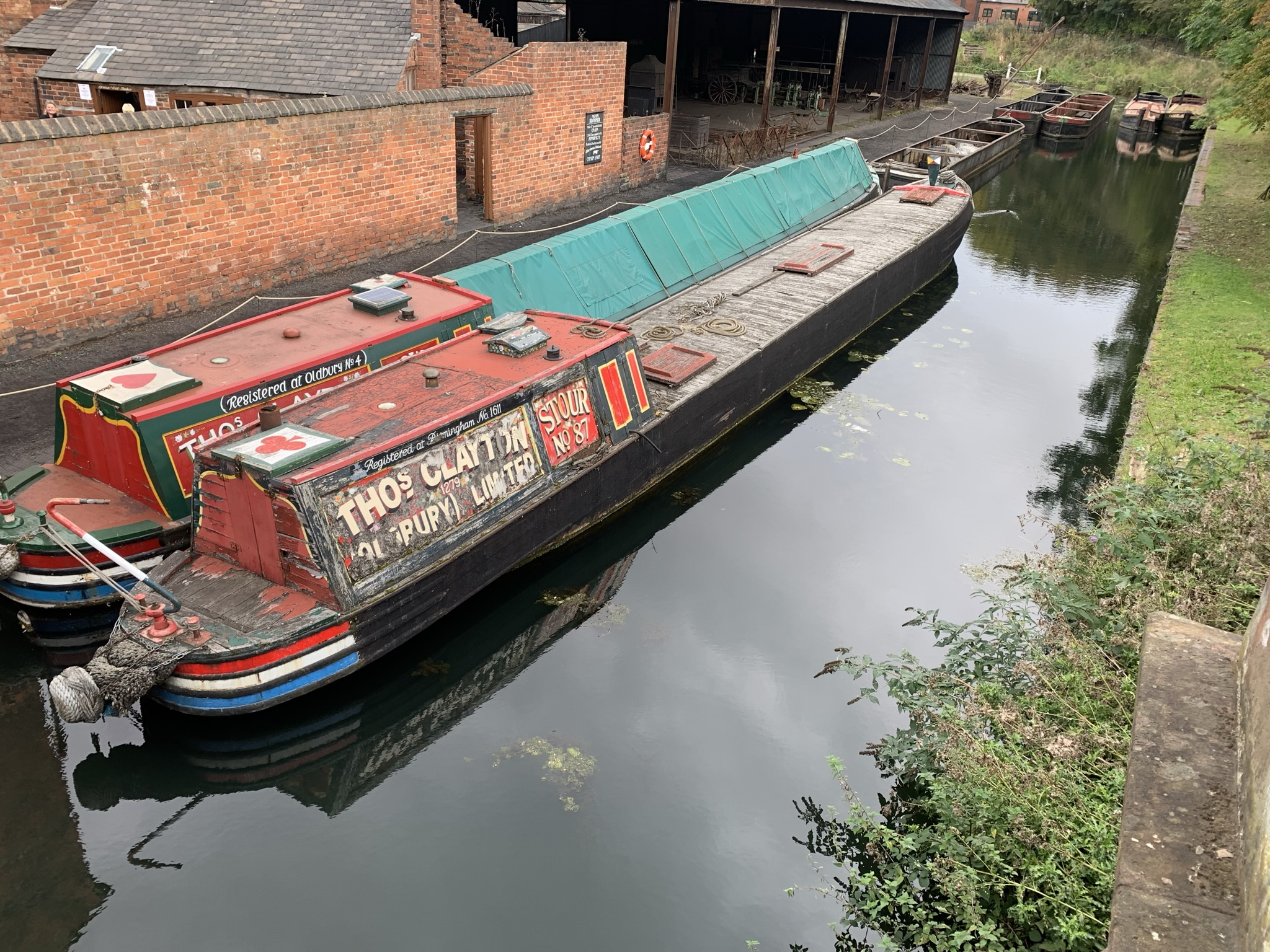
Historic narrowboat Stour at the Black Country Living Museum

The Stour is an all-wooden motor narrow boat powered by a Bolinder 11 kW diesel engine. It was built as a tar tanker in 1937 by Fellows Morton & Clayton at their Uxbridge dockyard for fuel oil carriers Thomas Clayton Ltd of Oldbury.

The hull has oak planked sides, elm bottoms, and a pine deck with a fully fitted traditional boatman's cabin. It was one of a large fleet of all wooden boats used by that Company for liquid cargo carrying, the main hold area being fully decked over.

When new, it would have carried refined fuels such as gas oil for powering machinery but was later used for carrying heavier lubricating oil from the fuel distribution plants on the Manchester Ship Canal.

It is now owned by the Black Country Living Museum, in Dudley, where it is based and can be seen dockside in the Lord Ward's Canal Arm at the museum.

The Stour is on the National Historic Ships register.
