= Thomas Oliver (religious writer) =

Scottish teacher and religious writer

Thomas Oliver

Dr Thomas Oliver (19 June 1871 – 12 September 1946) was a Scottish teacher and religious writer.

In the early 1900s Oliver was a tenant farmer in the Scottish Borders. He later became Principal of the Scottish Woollen Technical College, founded 1922. The College's predecessors were the Galashiels Combined Technical College, established in 1889; and the South of Scotland Central Technical College, established 1898. Oliver was employed to take charge of the technical classes, held within the Galashiels Public Hall.

== Religious life ==
Thomas Oliver was a member of the so-called Glanton Plymouth Brethren which broke away from the Raven Exclusive Brethren in 1908. It is not known at what age he became a committed Christian. He attended the Brethren assembly in Galashiels, and functioned as a Bible teacher among the assemblies of this Christian community.

== Author ==
Oliver published a number of works, both on his technical specialism of wool, as well as on religion. His published work on wool was highly respected, and he travelled to Australia in connection with his research. His publications included:

- Thomas Oliver, The Rise of the Scotch Tweed Technique (1911)
- Editor of The Textile Mercury, in collaboration with Thomas Oliver et al.. The Wool Year Book and Diary 1915
- Thomas Oliver & John Hart, Scotch Tweed - A Monthly Journal Devoted to the Advancement of Technique in Wool Manufacture

He was the editor of Scripture Quarterly magazine, which he described as "devoted mainly to the exposition of Scripture. "Till I come, give attendance to reading to exhortation (encouragement), to doctrine." (1 Tim. 4:13)." In connection with the magazine he gave the following statement of policy:

"As several correspondents have asserted that this is a party magazine, possibly due to judging by signatures rather than contents, I may state that after 26 years' exercise it was initiated by me without consultation. In 19l5, its advent was hindered by several circumstances and not until 1940 was I free to do the arduous work entailed. All expense has been met by me and no subsidy, other than the advertised price, has been or will be taken from any one. So the "party" allegation fails! Current ecclesiastical matters will be rigorously eschewed! I desire that brethren may dwell together harmoniously, expressing the unity of the Spirit in the bond of peace. Hence this "Quarterly" will (D.V.) proceed with the exposition of Scripture, all fragrant with the preciousness of Christ which alone can lift us above dissension and will cause our thoughts and speech to spread refreshment instead of discontent wherever we go."

He frequently wrote religious tracts under the pseudonym "Omicron". Oliver's religious publications include:

- The Cave of Adullam and Cognate Papers
- The Meanings of the Names of the Cities of Refuge; the Substance of Lectures Given in Australia and Elsewhere, then Expanded and Published in "Scripture Truth" Magazine
- Coming to Mount Zion and Its Sequel
- The House of God
- The Kingdom of God
- The Lord is There and Other Papers on Cognate Subjects
- Meditations on the Psalms
- Old Testament Studies
- Riches in Glory
- The Sufferings and Excellencies of Christ...
- Truths of Holy Scripture which Admit of no Argument
