= Providence Chapel, Black Country Living Museum =

Coordinates: 52.523163°N 2.077380°W

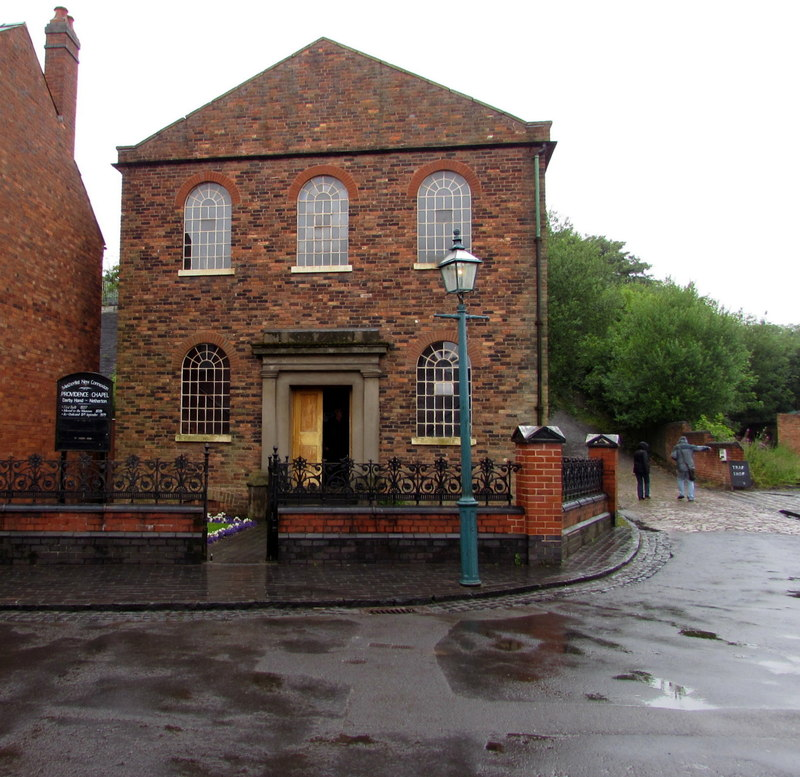
Entrance to the chapel

The Providence Chapel is a former Methodist place of worship, originally located in Darby Hand near Netherton, before being rebuilt at the Black Country Living Museum as an example of a typical Black Country chapel.

== Chapel origins ==
The Darby family brought a plot of land on Northfield Road and in 1828 work began on building the chapel. The Providence Chapel was named after a chapel in Epworth, Lincolnshire and was affiliated to the Methodist New Connexion. It was a centre of Christian beliefs and practices with a strong tradition of choral singing. The chapel was also a centre of education and welfare; it helped to alleviate hardship amongst the low paid workers of the Black Country. Trustees of the chapel created clubs like the Darby Hand Doctors Club to provide medical assistance.

== Relocation ==
In May 1971 the Sunday school building was destroyed by a fire and the chapel was closed in August 1974. The land was set to be sold and the building demolished. The Black Country Living Museum was invited to save some of the pews. The Museum was in fact interested in saving the whole building and in November 1975 the building was dismantled and the larger parts transferred to the Museum site. There were however problems with certain bricks which could not be used again. As luck would have it, it was possible to dismantle another chapel in Wolverhampton Street, Dudley which dated from 1828-9. This provided the right kind of brick for the chapel. Reconstruction at the Museum began in June 1977 and took two years, the chapel was dedicated in 1979.

== Building ==
Sanctuary and pulpit

The chapel is a simple, brick-built, rectangle with two small rear extensions. The front is 'relieved' by an entrance of rendered brick. The interior is plain and functional with a small lobby underneath a gallery that runs down the sides and rear of the chapel. The side galleries are supported by fluted columns with ornate capitals that divide the interior into aisles. In the middle stands a dominant pulpit where the minister or preacher would be able to see the whole of his congregation. The pulpit is situated below a scrolled banner painted on the wall which proclaims "Worship the Lord in the Beauty of Holiness" (from Psalm 96).
