= Black Country Living Museum =

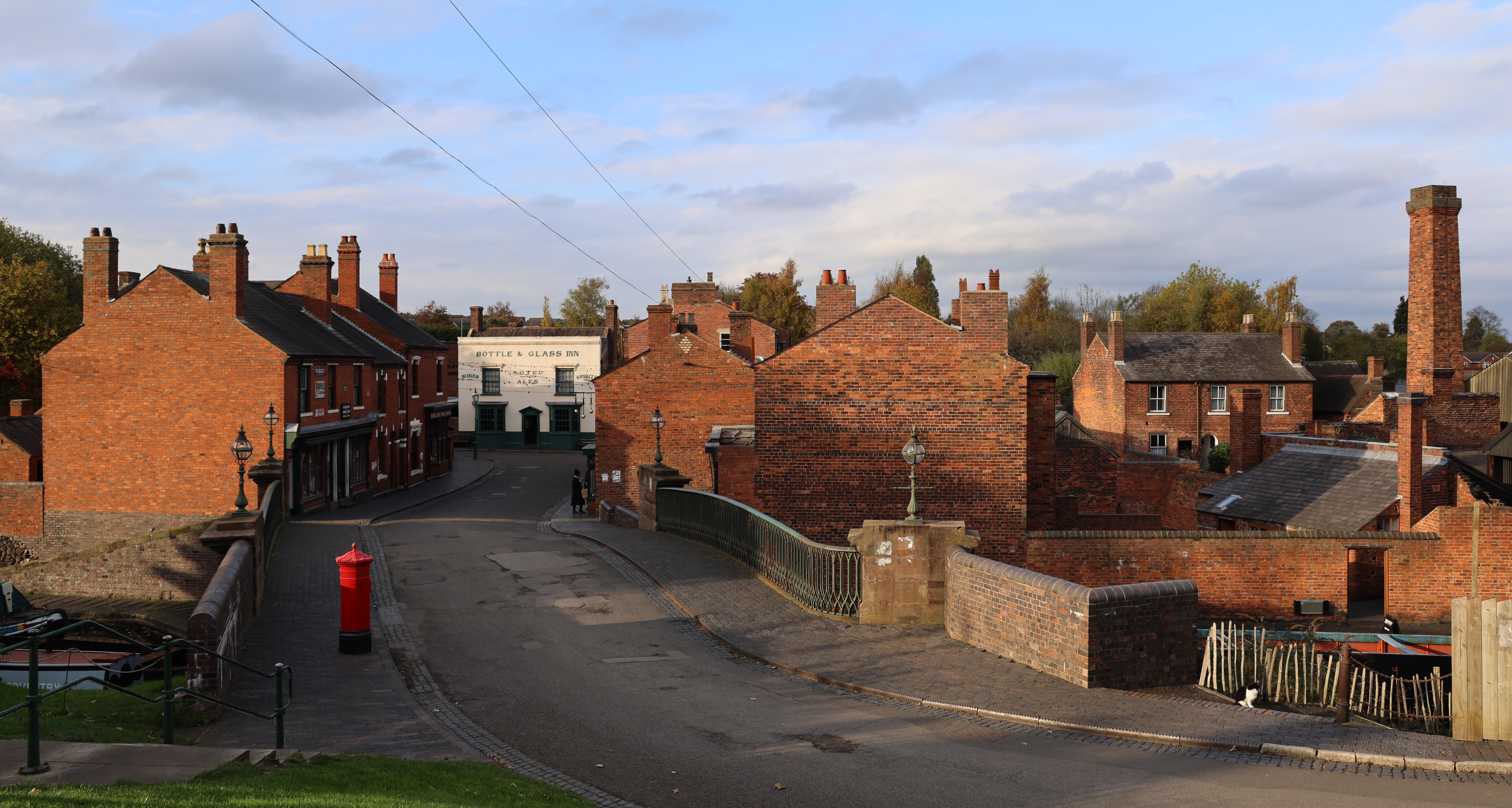
- The main village street and 1930s area

- Location in the West Midlands
- Established: 1975
- Location: Dudley, West Midlands
- Coordinates: 52°31′18″N 2°04′36″W
- Type: Open-air living museum
- Director: Andrew Lovett
- Website: bclm.com

The Black Country Living Museum (formerly the Black Country Museum) is an open-air museum of rebuilt historic buildings in Dudley, West Midlands, England. It is located in the centre of the Black Country, 10 miles (16 km) west of Birmingham. The museum occupies 10.5 hectares (26 acres) of former industrial land partly reclaimed from a former railway goods yard, disused lime kilns, canal arm and former coal pits.

The museum opened to the public in 1978, and has since added more than 50 shops, houses and other industrial buildings from around the metropolitan boroughs of Dudley, Sandwell and Walsall and the City of Wolverhampton (collectively known as the Black Country), mainly in a specially built village. Most buildings were relocated from their original sites to form a base from where demonstrators portray life spanning 300 years of history, with a focus on 1850–1950.

The museum continues to evolve, as further buildings and other exhibits are added.

== Background ==
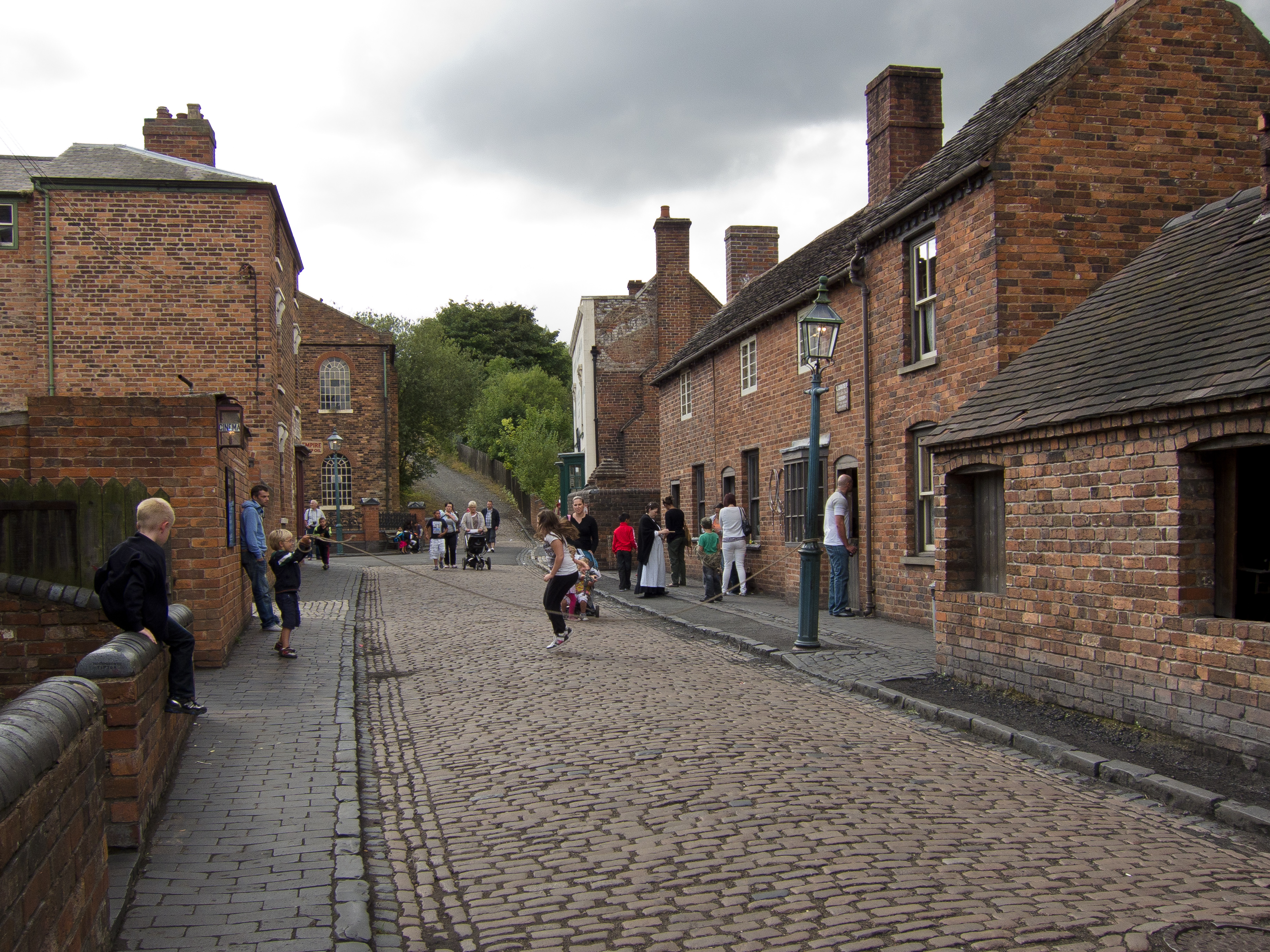
Skipping in the street, a common sight at one time

The museum is close to the site where Dud Dudley first experimented with the technique of smelting iron with coal instead of wood charcoal and making iron in modest quantities for industrial use. Abraham Darby later refined the process using coke to produce a better quality product in greater quantities. Dudley has a claim to be "the birthplace of the Industrial Revolution", the Black Country is famous for its wide range of steel-based products from nails to the anchor and anchor chain for RMS Titanic.

The site's coal mining heritage is shown by an underground drift and colliery surface buildings. The museum has a working replica of a Newcomen atmospheric engine. Thomas Newcomen's invention was first successfully put to use in Tipton in 1712. The museum's reconstruction was based on a print engraved by Thomas Barney, filemaker of Wolverhampton, in 1719.

Electric trams and trolleybuses transport visitors from the entrance to the village where thirty domestic and industrial buildings have been relocated close to the canal basin. The museum is one of three in the UK with working trolleybuses. The route to the village passes the Cast Iron Houses and a 1930s fairground. A narrowboat operated by Dudley Canal Trust makes trips on the Dudley Canal and into the Dudley Tunnel.

On 16 February 2012, the museum's collection was awarded designated status by Arts Council England, a mark of distinction celebrating its unique national and international importance.

The museum is run by the Black Country Living Museum Trust, a registered charity under English law.

== Exhibitions ==
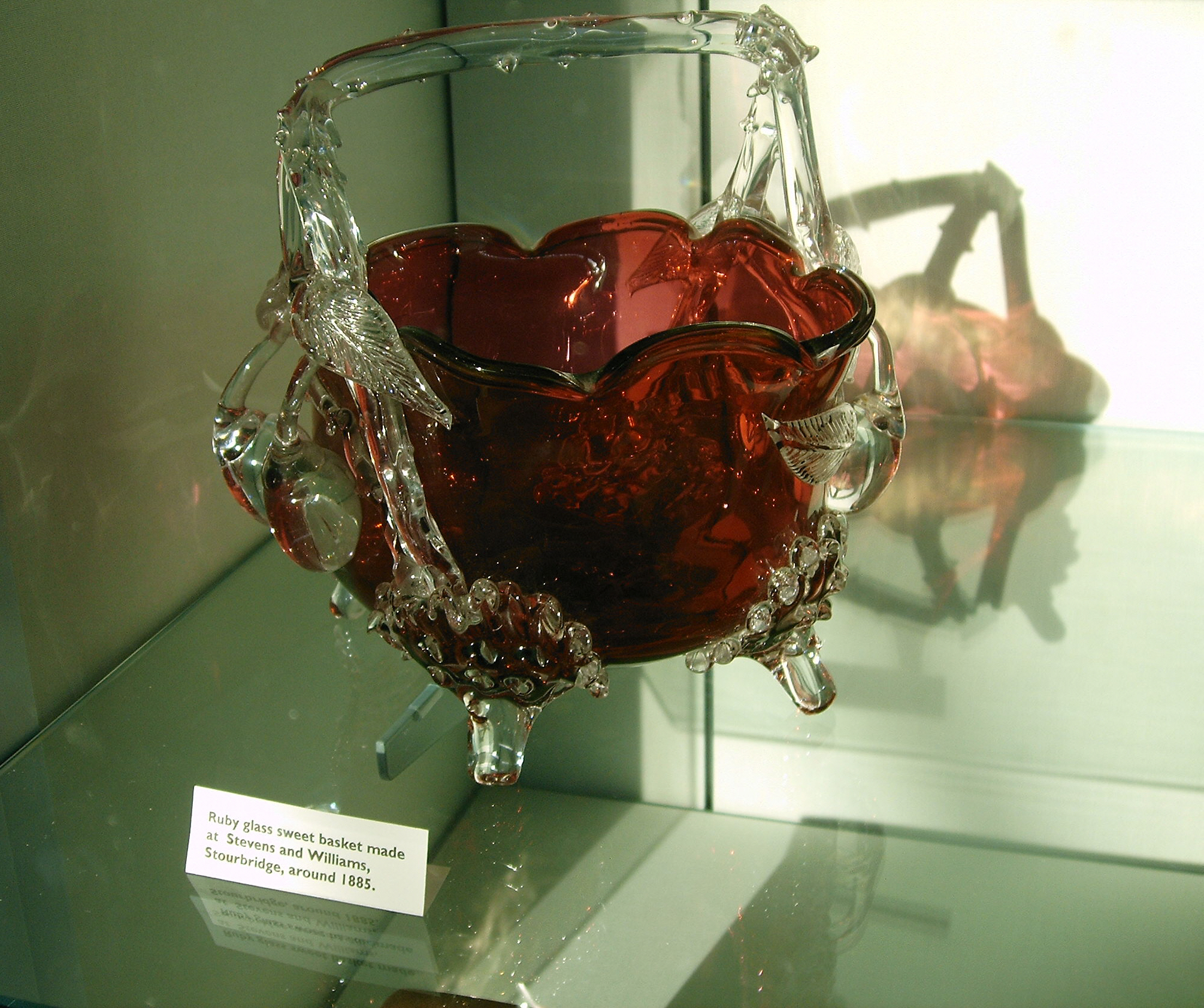
Ruby glass sweet bowl

By the main entrance in the old Rolfe Street Baths from Smethwick (1888) are displays of local artefacts encompassing some of the many products which were made by Black Country industry, cast iron hollow ware, animal traps, vehicles, chain, anchors, enamels, weighing scales, laundry irons, nails, locks and fire clay products. The exhibition includes more fragile items such as glassware, reflecting the centuries-old industry that produced lead crystal glass and the Joseph Chance glass works between Oldbury and Smethwick.

== Mining and lime kilns ==
The museum site contained 42 disused mine shafts, most of which had been filled in. Two are preserved, one at the Racecourse Colliery and Brook Shaft.

In 1712, Thomas Newcomen built the world's first successful steam engine which was used for pumping water from coal mines on Lord Dudley's estates. In 1986, after ten years of research, the museum completed the construction of a full-scale working replica of the engine. The "fire engine" is housed in a brick building from which a wooden beam projects through one wall. Rods hang from the outer end of the beam and operate pumps at the bottom of the mine shaft which raise the water to the surface. The engine has a boiler, a cylinder and piston and operating valves. A coal fire heats water in the boiler which is little more than a covered pan and the steam generated passes through a valve into the brass cylinder above it. The cylinder is more than two metres long and 52 centimetres in diameter. The steam in the cylinder is condensed by injecting cold water and the vacuum beneath the piston pulls the inner end of the beam down causing the pump to move.

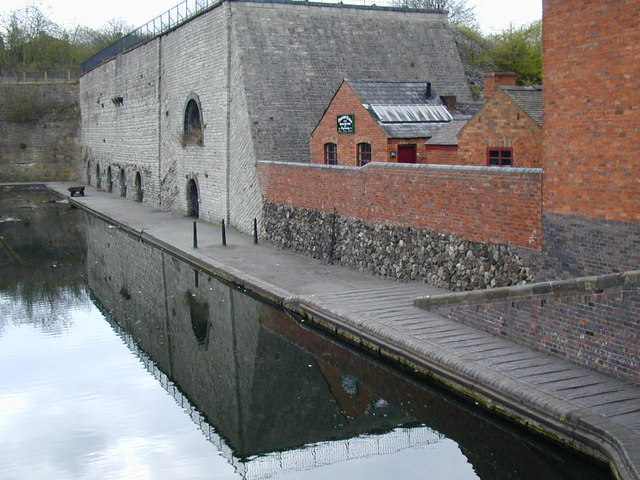
Lime kilns at the museum

Lime working and processing was carried out on the site from medieval times. Evidence of quarries and underground remains, the canal, and preserved lime kilns are parts of a scheduled ancient monument which has features from the medieval, Industrial Revolution and 20th century. Standing alongside canal arm are the lime kilns, built by the Earl of Dudley to process limestone quarried from Wren's Nest workings. The earliest of the three surviving kilns dates from the late 18th century.

== Metal working ==
The trap shop was built in 1913 in Rookery Street, Wednesfield. It was offered to the museum in 1982. Sidebotham's Steel Trap Works was not rebuilt in its entirety and the original structure was shortened. The exhibit, set around 1930, contains the office, trap shop and the machine shop.

The nail shop is a replica of a back-yard workshop, built in the 1880s from 17 Chapel Street, Halesowen. It houses equipment from the Halesowen workshop operated by Sidney Tether in the 1940s. It is in use on a regular basis by the resident nail maker who demonstrates the skill of forging nails by hand.

The brass foundry was built in 1869 in Shaw Street, Walsall and closed after the Second World War but re-opened in 1964 by James Powell and used until his death in 1973. The building and its equipment were relocated to the museum in 1986. It can be seen in operation when the brass caster demonstrates traditional skills in casting horse brasses, pot hooks and other small items.

The rolling mill installed at the Birchley Works in Oldbury in 1923 ceased to operate in 1976 and it was moved to Lord Ward's Canal Arm. The museum operates it from time to time using volunteers.

The Anchor Forge was rescued from Isiah Preston's in Cradley Heath. The steam-hammer was installed second hand in the 1920s to forge parts for ships' anchors and the other equipment including furnace and boiler also came from Prestons. The building was saved from Johnson's Rolling Mill site in West Bromwich.

The chain maker's shop represents one of the many workshops that made small and medium size chain. By the mid-1800s the chain industry was mostly associated with Cradley, Cradley Heath, Old Hill, Quarry Bank and Netherton. It is operational and the skill of making chain by hand can be watched daily.

An Oliver hammer was a treadle-operated hammer that forged bolts by forcing red hot lengths of iron into a die. The machine shop contained several Oliver hammers used to forge special parts to order. It was founded by Onan Lowe and taken over by T. W. Lench Ltd.

== Village ==
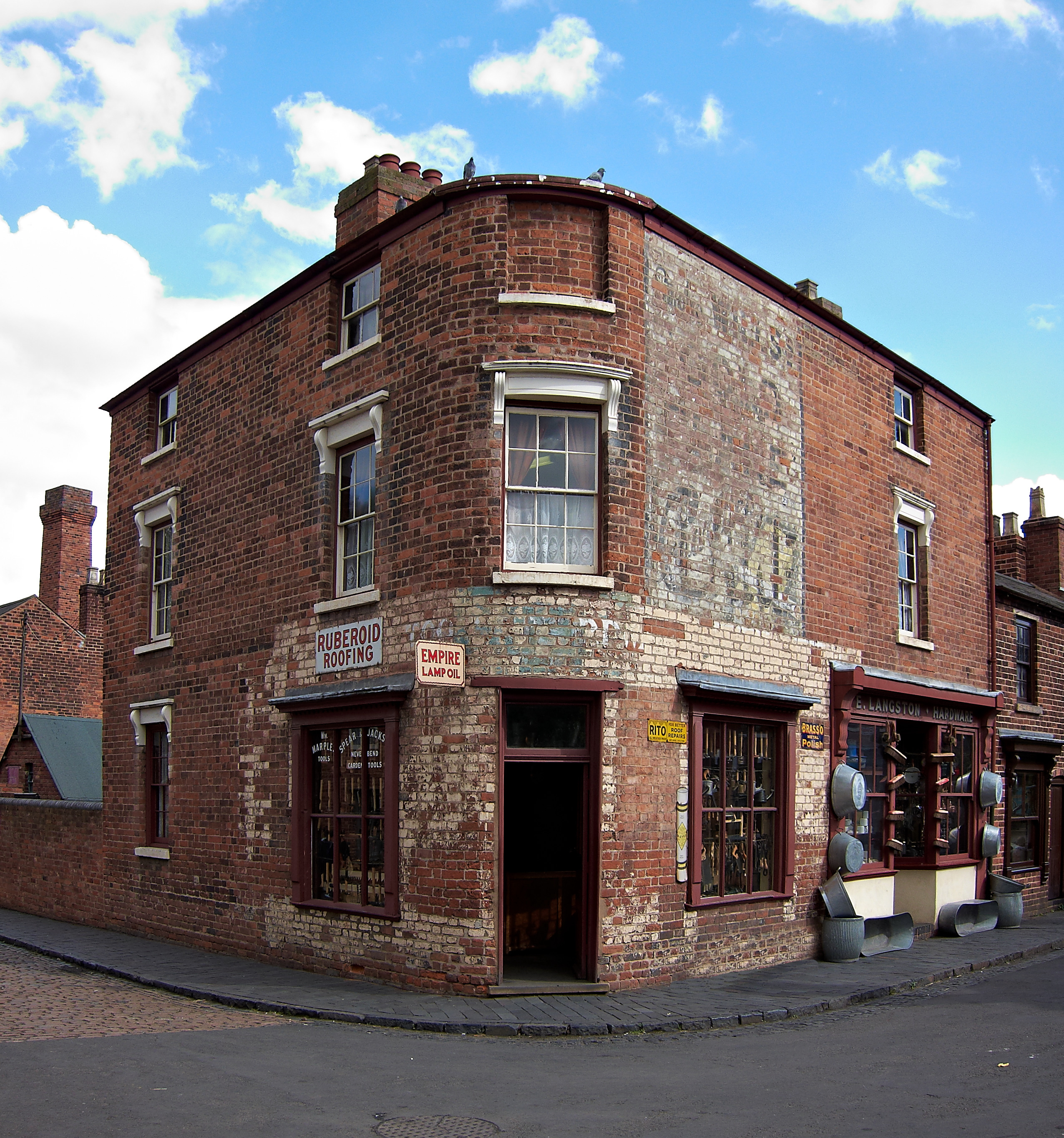
Hardware Store and Ironmonger's, formerly Pipers Row Wolverhampton.

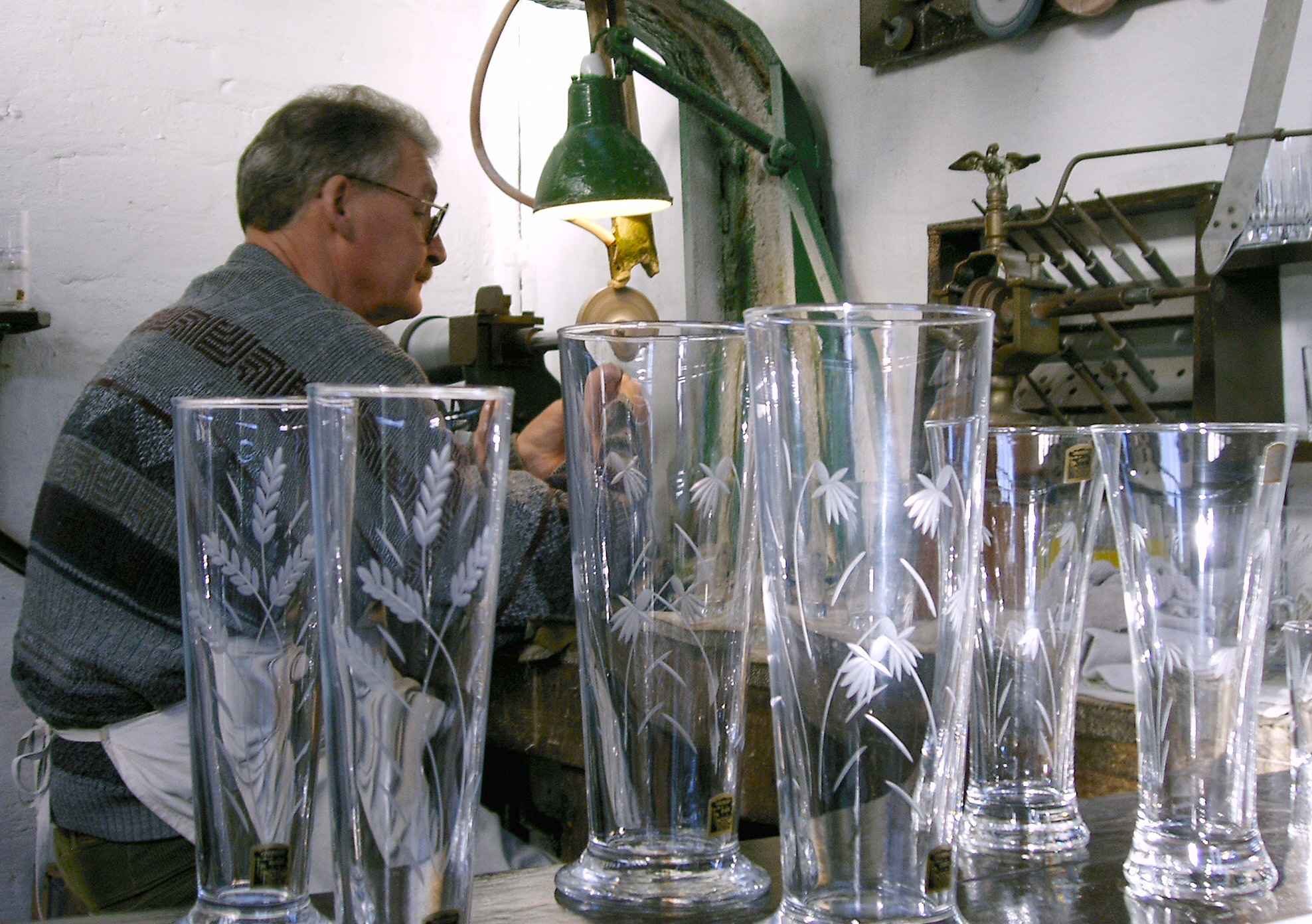
Glass engraver at work in a workshop in the village.

On the low ground at the northern end of the site, houses, shops, workshops and public buildings have been dismantled and rebuilt brick by brick to create an early 20th-century village. Activities in the buildings are demonstrated by staff in period costume. The village preserves a cross section of social and industrial history.

The village shops include Gregory's General Store, Emile Doo's chemist shop, a sweet shop and cake shop with a bakery at the back. There is a hardware and ironmongers shop from Pipers Row in Wolverhampton. and a pawnbroker's shop that was relocated to the museum in 1991.

Brook Street back-to-back houses, built in the 1850s, were relocated from Woodsetton and were the homes of colliers, farm workers and ironworkers. The anchor maker's house from Lawrence Lane in Old Hill was the first to be relocated to the museum and is an example of late-Victorian housing.

Public buildings include Providence Chapel from Darby End/Hand near Netherton, one of the first buildings to be rebuilt, and the Bottle and Glass Inn, a working public house set out as it would have been in 1910.

The village postbox stood on the corner of Baker Street and Blandford Street, London in 1865. It was designed by architect J W Penfold and made by Cochrane, Grove and Company.

The Carter's Yard from Ogley Hay Road Burntwood, Cannock was built around 1900. It was dismantled and brought to the museum in the 1990s.

== 1930s Street (Old Birmingham Road) ==
Old Birmingham Road links St James's School with the Cradley Heath Workers' Institute. Here buildings have been set in the 1930s to tell the story of the years leading up to the Second World War.

Museum staff in St James's School demonstrate lessons and school life from the turn of the 20th century. The school building opened in Eve Hill, Dudley in 1842 for pupils aged 5–11. It was decided to transfer the building to the museum in 1989 and relocation was completed by October 1990, with the exhibit opening the following year.

Hobbs & Sons fish and chip shop and H Morrall's gentlemen's outfitters have been returned to 1935 condition. The shops come from Hall Street, Dudley and date from the late-18th century and refaced with bright red pressed brickwork in 1889. The tiled interior of Hobbs features restored hand-painted tiled wall panels. The frying range is of a design patented in 1932 made by E.W. Proctor of Huddersfield. In the 1930s many of Joseph Hobbs's customers worked in factories or shops.

Four buildings were rescued from Birmingham Street, Oldbury and date to about 1860. The block is dominated by the green painted fascia of Humphrey Brothers, builders' merchants, who occupied the premises from 1921. It has a replica shop front from about 1932. Humphreys sold fireplaces, sanitaryware and building supplies including Walpamur, a flat paint used for internal walls. The motorcycle shop is based on the business of A. Hartill & Sons which was located in Mount Pleasant, Bilston. The window displays six locally made motor bikes dating from 1929 to 1934. Next door is Alfred Preedy & Sons tobacconist shop, established in Dudley in 1868. James Gripton's radio shop is from the 1920s and this reconstruction, set in 1939, contains 'new' and second radios.

The brick tunnel and cart entrance provide access to a late 1930s kitchen with an electric cooker made by Revo of Tipton. There is a radio workshop behind Gripton's and then the stairs lead to two first floor living rooms and two bedrooms which are all set in the late 1930s and furnished with original 1930s style furniture and wall paper.

The Cradley Heath Workers' Institute was built with surplus funds raised in 1910 during the strike for a minimum wage by women chain makers. The Arts and Crafts style building was designed by architect, Albert Thomas Butler, and opened on 10 June 1912. It became a centre for educational meetings, social gatherings and trade union activities in Cradley Heath. Re-erected at the museum it is a monument to Mary Macarthur and her campaign to establish a national minimum wage in the "sweated trades" where people worked long hours for poverty wages typically in appalling conditions. The building contains reconstructed offices, a news room with a digital interpretation of the background to the strike and a large hall which is used for a wide range of activities including theatre performances and concerts.

== 1930s fairground ==
The 1930s fairground located behind the school represents a travelling fairground that would have brought entertainment to people in the early 1900s. Such fairs set up on waste ground and for a few days provided thrills, entertainment and a change for those who might never go on holiday. The collection of historic rides includes a helter skelter and the Ark, the latest thing in high-speed rides when introduced in the 1920s. It was updated over the years but not converted into a waltzer. It remains one of the few "fourlift" Arks in the country.

== Lord Ward's Canal Arm ==
Work began on the boat dock in 1976 and the museum aimed to recreate a typical dock that would have been found on the Birmingham Canal Navigations (BCN). Docks like the one at the museum would have been formed from recycled wooden boats. They were used to build wooden boats or maintain iron and composite boats.

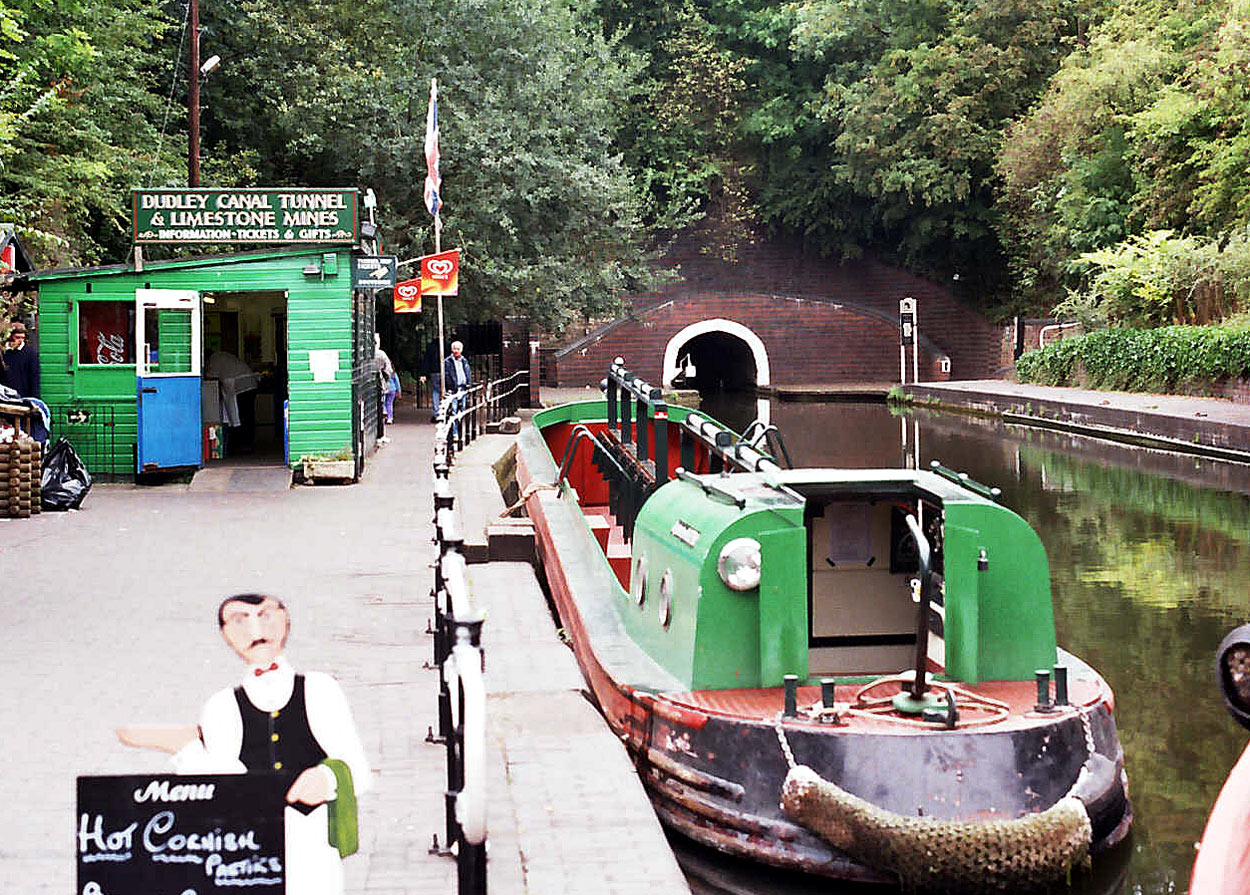
Dudley Canal Trust boat outside the Dudley Tunnel, behind the museum

Adjacent to the museum is the Dudley Tunnel. Visitors can take a 45-minute skipper-guided trip into the tunnel through the historic limestone mines and caverns on a boat operated by the Dudley Canal Trust.

=== Boat collection ===
The museum's boat display consists of boats that it owns, are on loan or have mooring agreements.

The museum owns:

- Prosper
- Edna Irene
- Admiral Beatty
- Warehouse (GKN14)
- Ham
- Amp (GWR 19)
- Stewarts and Lloyds 100
- Matty Butty
- North Star II
- Diamond
- Bessie
- Eustace
- President
- Kildare
- Stour
- Birchills

Other boats at the museum:

- District Number 1
- Peacock
- Coventry
- GWR 15
- BHP 2
- FMC 138
- BHP 3
- Ross

== Transport collection ==
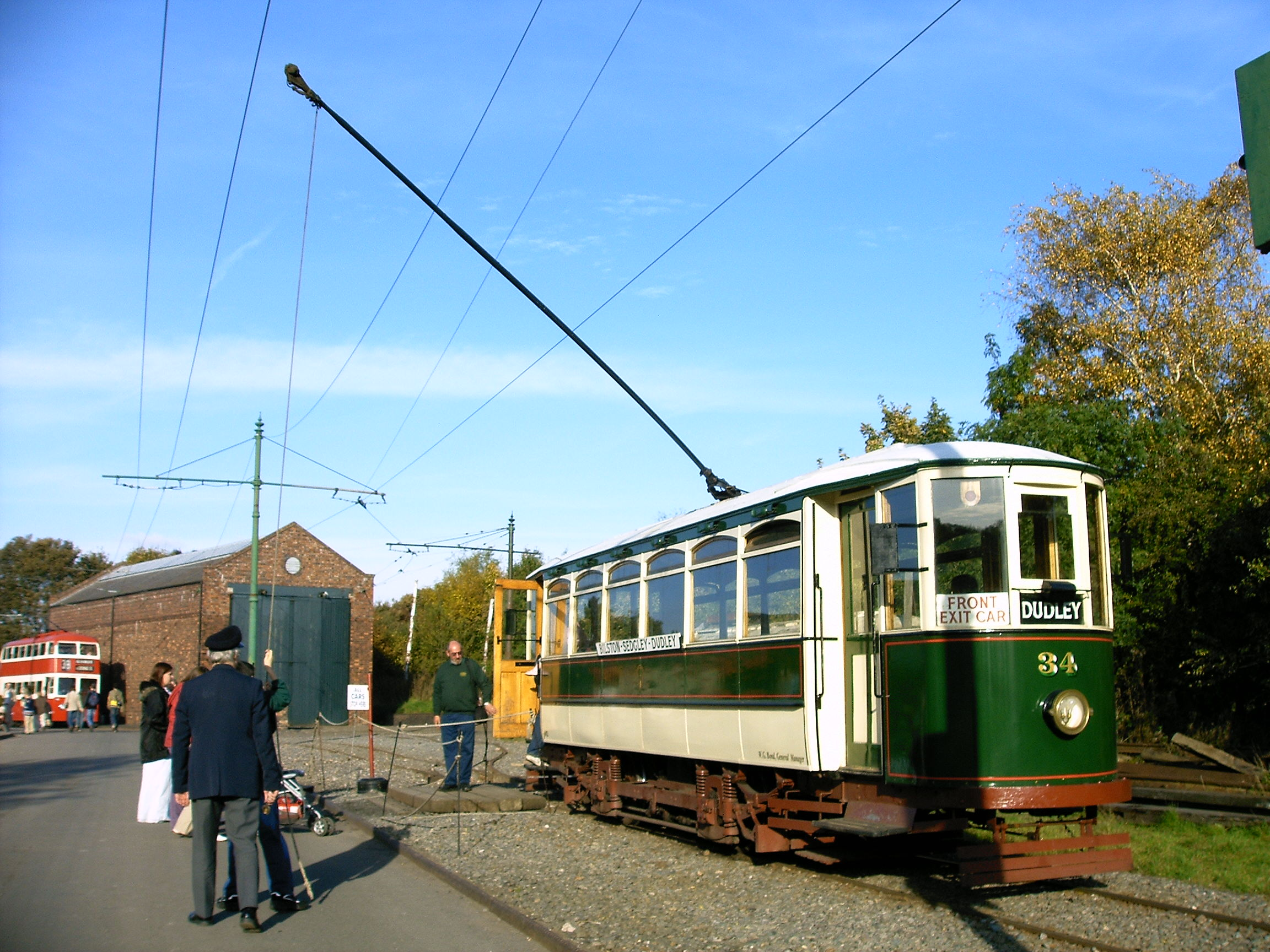
Wolverhampton District Electric Tramways Company tram No. 34

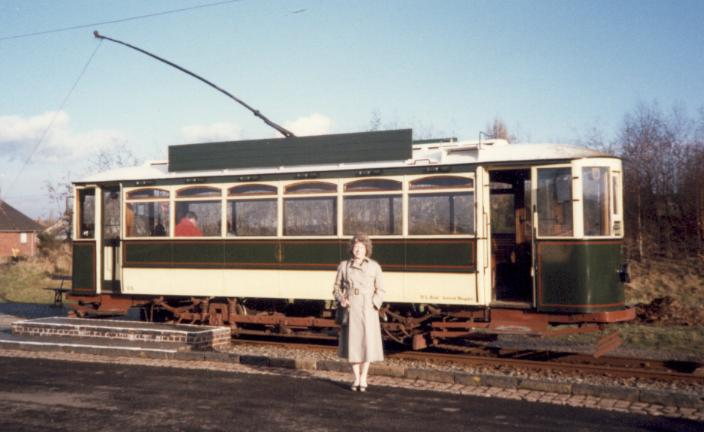
Dudley, Stourbridge and District Electric Traction Company tram No. 5 operating at the museum in 1990

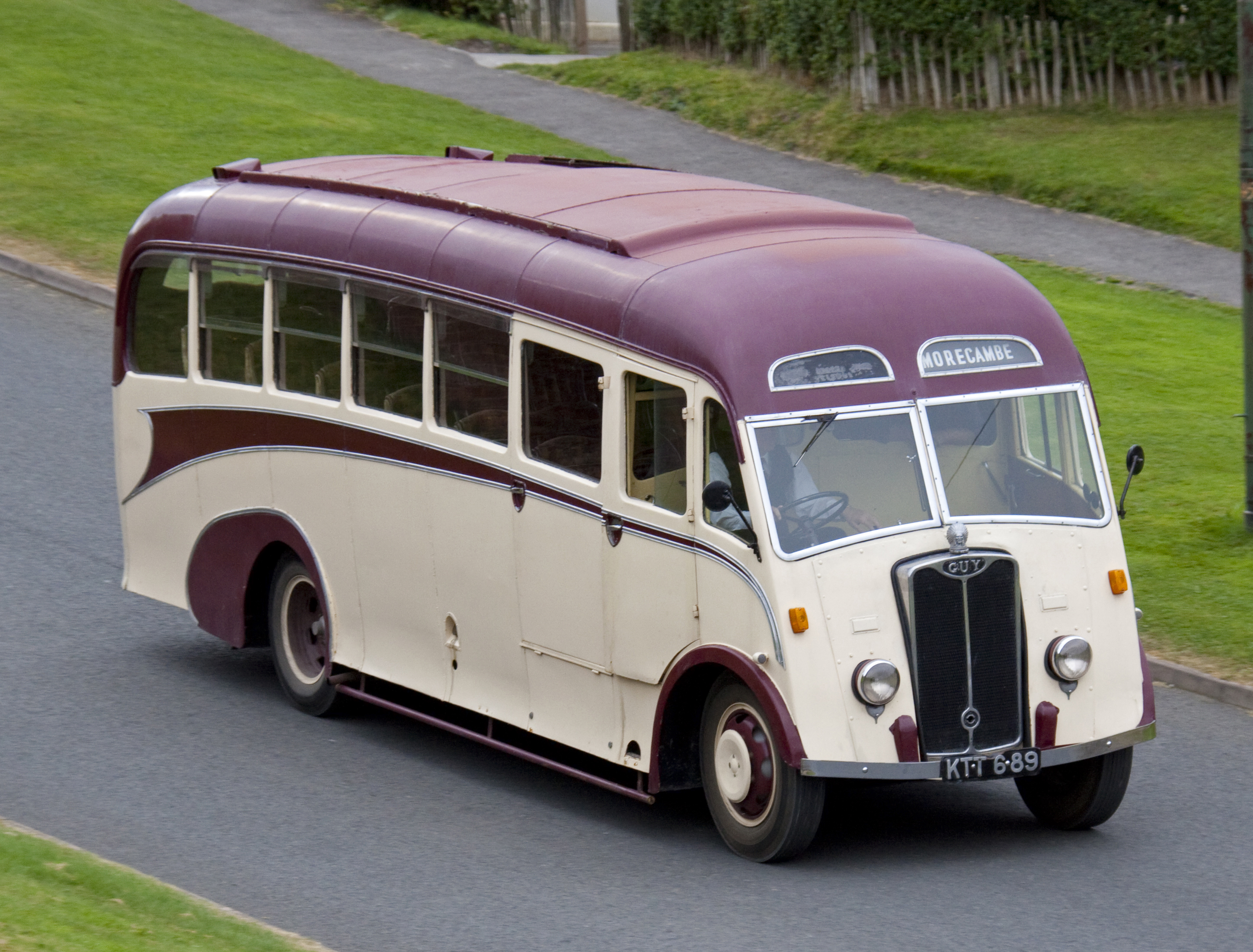
Guy single-decker KTT 689

The size of the museum site provides the opportunity to demonstrate many of the road transport exhibits which were both used and made in the Black Country.

=== Trams ===
- Dudley, Stourbridge and District Electric Traction Company No. 5 Tividale single-decker built in 1920. This was the museum's first tram. It has worked much more at the museum than for its original owners. Returned to service in December 2017 after a £120,000 overhaul.
- Wolverhampton District Electric Tramways Company No. 19 works car built in 1902. Stored awaiting restoration. Originally operated with Dudley, Stourbridge and District as open-topper no. 36.
- Wolverhampton Tramways Company Horse Tram No. 23 open-top double-decker built in 1892. The museum's oldest tram, and is currently on display at the back of the Tram Depot.
- Wolverhampton District Electric Tramways Company No. 34 Tividale single-decker built in 1919. Commenced in service at the museum in 1997 after restoration. Stored awaiting overhaul after 20 years of operation.
- Wolverhampton Corporation Tramways open-top double-decker No. 49 built in 1909. Returned to traffic in 2004 after a 25-year restoration, is now in service in the museum.
- Dudley, Stourbridge and District Electric Traction Company No. 75 Tividale single-decker built in 1919. Stored awaiting restoration.
- Wolverhampton Corporation Tramways No. 102 Tividale single-decker built in 1920. Was used as a tram shelter at the museum in the 1980s and 1990s, currently stored awaiting restoration.

=== Motor buses ===
- West Bromwich Corporation Daimler CVG6 GEA 174 built in 1948. Operational following completion of restoration in 2013.
- Midland Red BMMO D9 6342 HA built in 1963. Operational following completion of restoration in 2007.
- Guy Motors KTT 689 built in 1948 and delivered new to Court of Torquay. Operational.
- West Bromwich Corporation Dennis E-Type EA 4181 built in 1929.

=== Trolleybuses ===
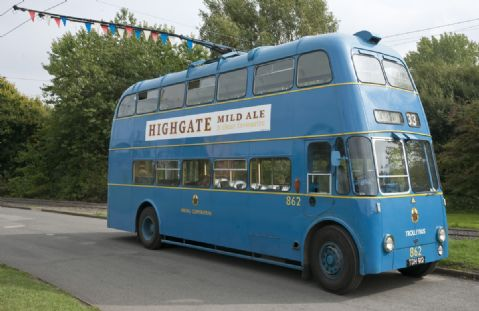
Walsall Corporation trolleybus 862 at the museum

The museum operates a trolleybus service on certain days, unlike the tram which is usually operated seven days a week. The route is one of the few double deck trolley bus services left in the world, as most of the world's trolley buses are single deckers.

The museum's fleet numbers three resident trolleybuses from the Black Country's two former trolley bus networks, and one which has been painted to resemble a local trolleybus. Unlike Birmingham's tram service, Birmingham Corporation Trolley Buses never operated in the Black Country. The Resident Fleet is listed below;

- Wolverhampton Corporation Transport 78 – A Guy built 1931 Trolleybus that still requires restoration.
- Wolverhampton Corporation Transport 433 – A Sunbeam with body work by C. H. Roe, this time a W4 built in 1946 which was retired with the rest of Wolverhampton's trolley buses in 1967. Operational.
- Bradford Corporation Transport 735 – A Karrier W built in 1946. Though it worked with Bradford for all its working life, it has been painted in Walsall Corporation blue in order to resemble trolleybuses that would have operated nearby. Operational.
- Walsall Corporation Transport 862 – A Sunbeam F4A with a Willowbrook Body, it was built in 1955 and retired from Walsall in 1970 on the closure of the trolleybus network. Operational.

=== Motor cars ===
Wolverhampton was home to some early manufacturers of motor cars, such as Sunbeam, Clyno, AJS and Star. Frisky cars were also made in Wolverhampton, while the Black Country town of Kingswinford is home to Westfield cars.

The museum collection includes a 1903 Sunbeam, a 1912 Star and a 1931 AJS as well as examples of later vehicles such as the Kieft, Frisky and Westfield Topaz.

=== Motorcycles ===
There are approximately 40 motorcycles in the museum's collection, all of which were made in the Black Country. A large proportion were manufactured by Sunbeam and AJS, but there are also examples by firms such as Wearwell Cycle Company and Rockson. The museum is affiliated to the British Motorcycle Charitable Trust.

=== Other vehicles ===
The museum does not have an extensive collection of Black Country bicycles, but there are examples by manufacturers such as Harry Albino and Star.

Unusual vehicles in the fleet include a 1924 Guy-Morris fire engine, a Model T Ford van used by Willenhall firm Brevitt's and a Bean of Tipton flatbed truck.

== Other collections ==
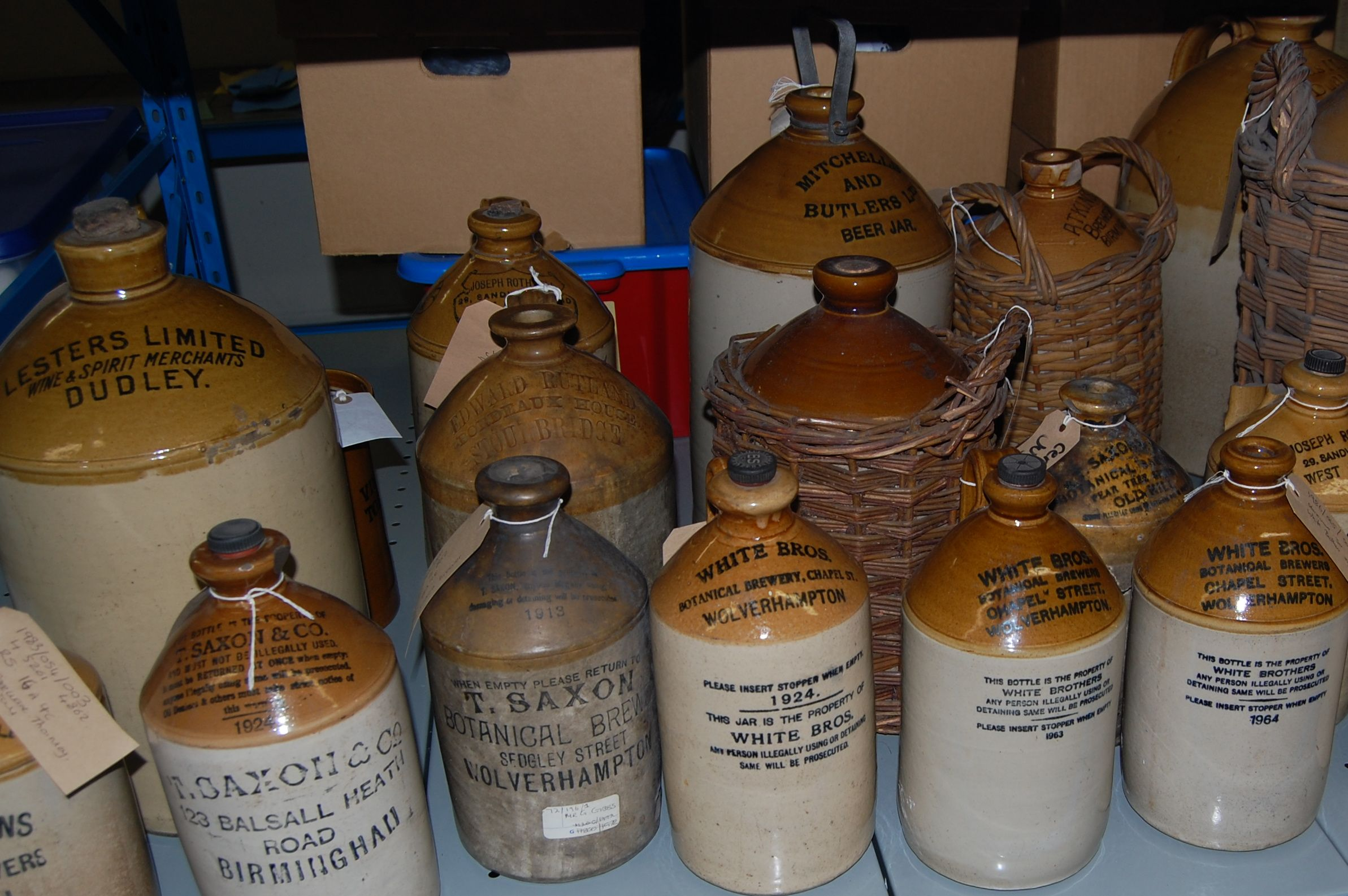
Variety of stoneware bottles in one of the museum's extensive storerooms

In addition to the wide range of displayed collections, the museum has extensive research collections held in store. These include historic objects, archival material and library books, all of which can be viewed by appointment.

== Filming location ==
The museum has been used as a set for many film and television productions, particularly the first season of Rosie & Jim and the BBC dramas WPC 56 and Peaky Blinders. Stan & Ollie, a feature film on the life of Laurel and Hardy, shot some of its scenes on the museum's 1930s Street.

== Future plans ==
On 15 June 2017 it was announced that the museum had been awarded £9.8 million from the National Lottery towards their £21.7m project BCLM: Forging Ahead, which will allow the museum to tell the story of the Black Country up to the closure of the Baggeridge Coal Mine in 1968. Plans include the translocation, recreation or replication at the Museum of Wolverhampton's Elephant & Castle pub, Dudley's Burgin's Newsagents, a hairdressers, an NHS clinic, West Bromwich Gas Showroom and Dudley's Woodside Library, and a butchers all dating from the 1940s to the 1960s. The new plans will see the museum space increase by one third. The plans were due to be completed in 2022. It is expected that 60 jobs would be created directly as a result of the expansion.

== See also ==
- Blists Hill Victorian Town – Ironbridge, Telford, Shropshire
- Beamish Museum – County Durham, England
- Avoncroft Museum of Historic Buildings – Bromsgrove, England
- Summerlee Heritage Park – Coatbridge, North Lanarkshire, Scotland
- Ulster Folk and Transport Museum – Cultra, Northern Ireland
- St Fagans National History Museum – Museum of Welsh Life, Cardiff, Wales
- Sovereign Hill – Living Australian gold rush museum. Ballarat, Australia

== Gallery ==
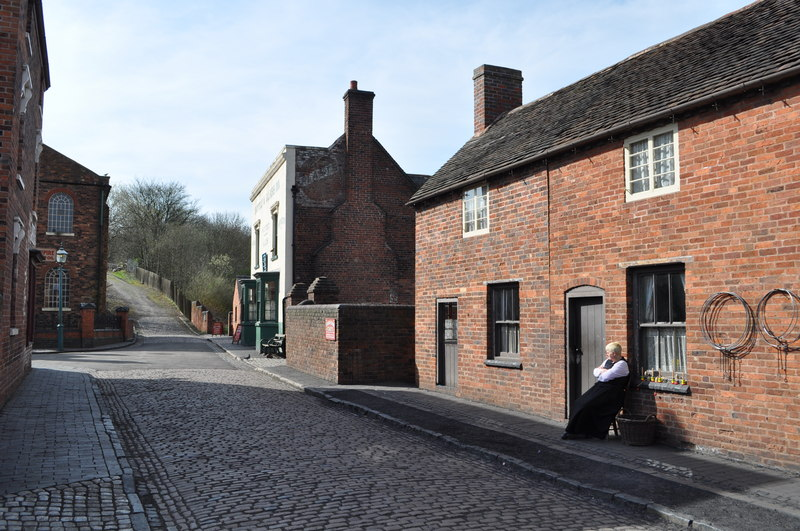
Station Road Cottages

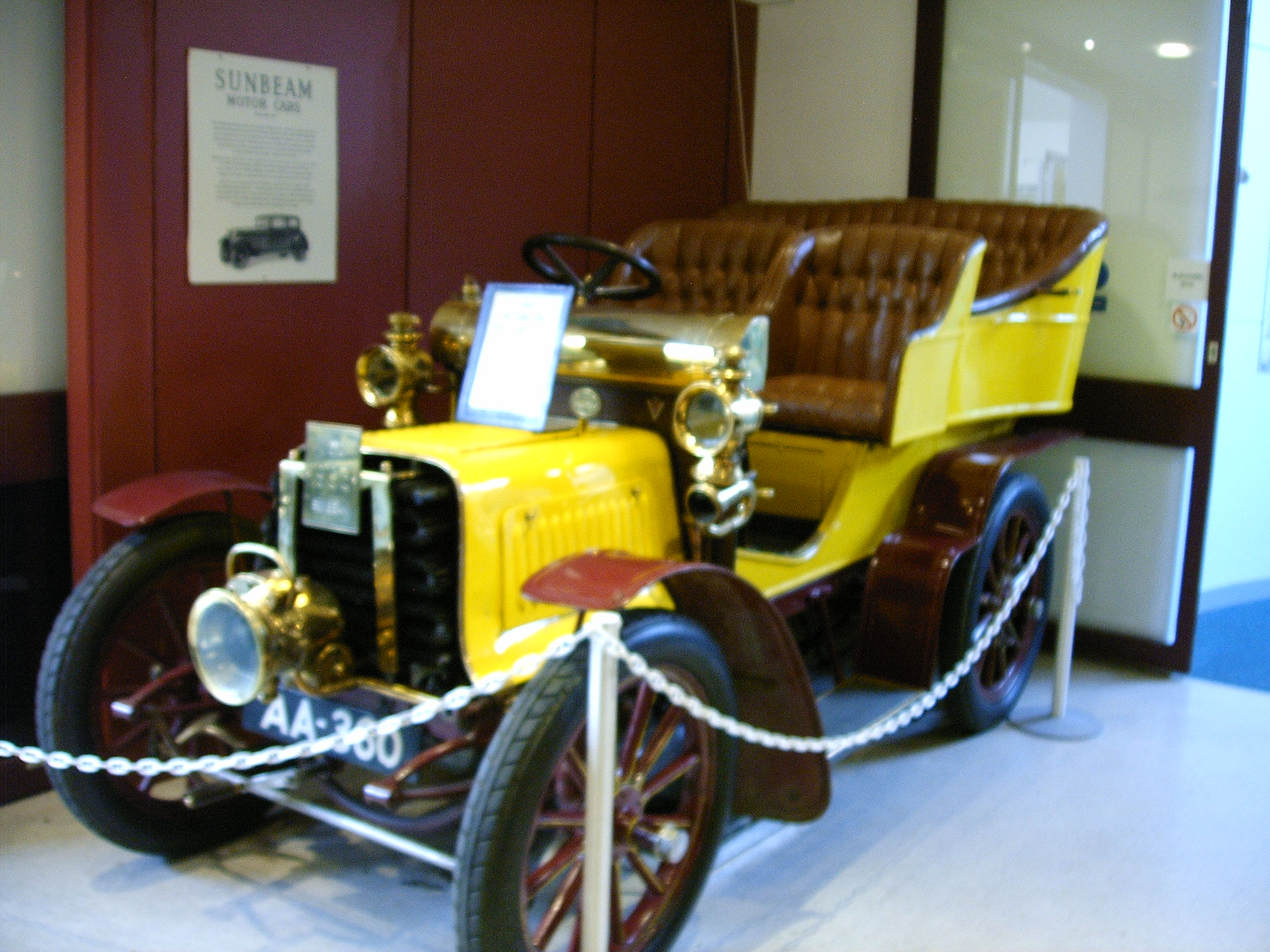
Early Sunbeam motor car.

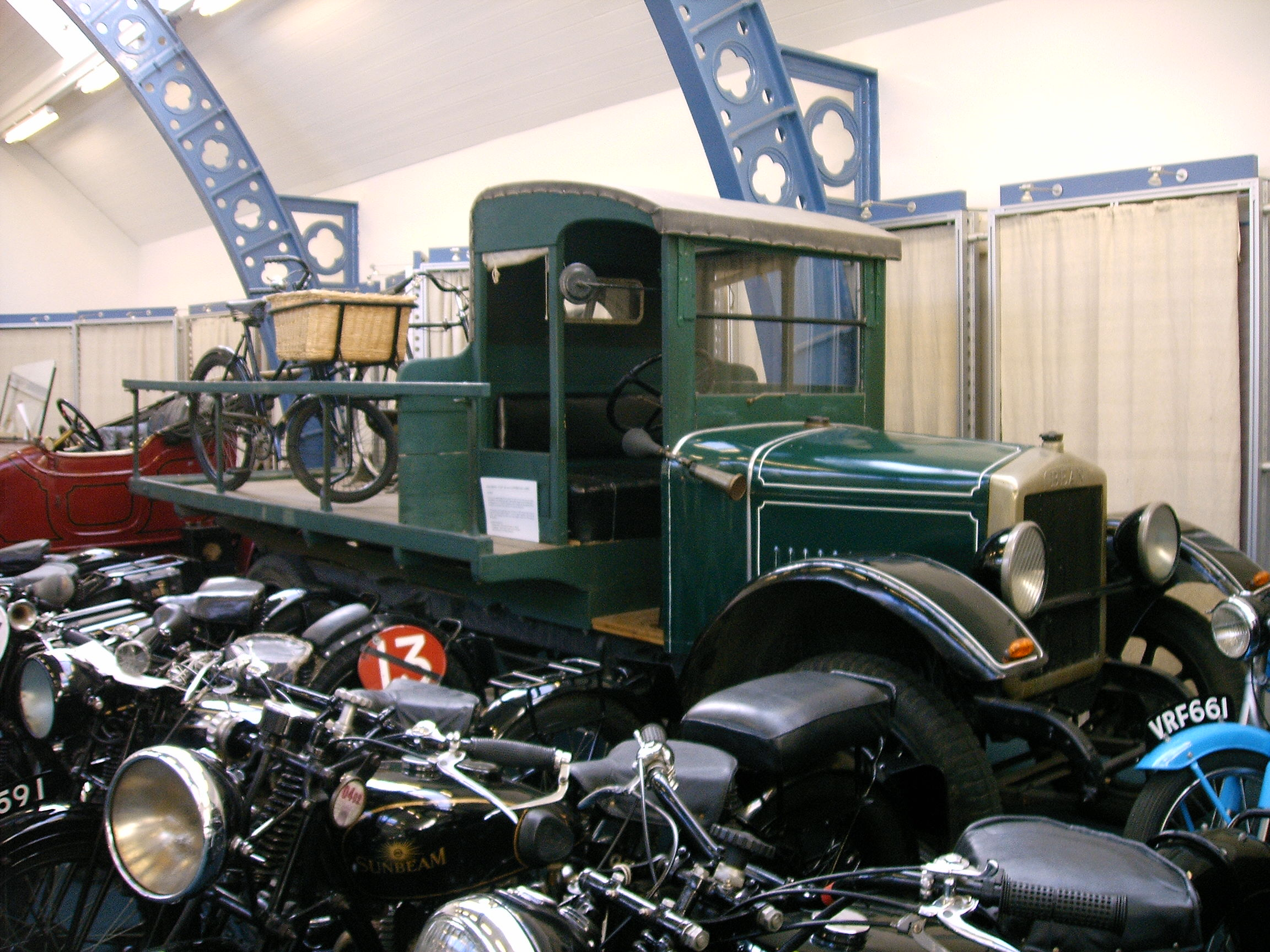
Vehicles on display Exhibition Hall Two, prior to 2008. The vehicle collection is now displayed in the Bradburn & Wedge showroom and other areas across the site.

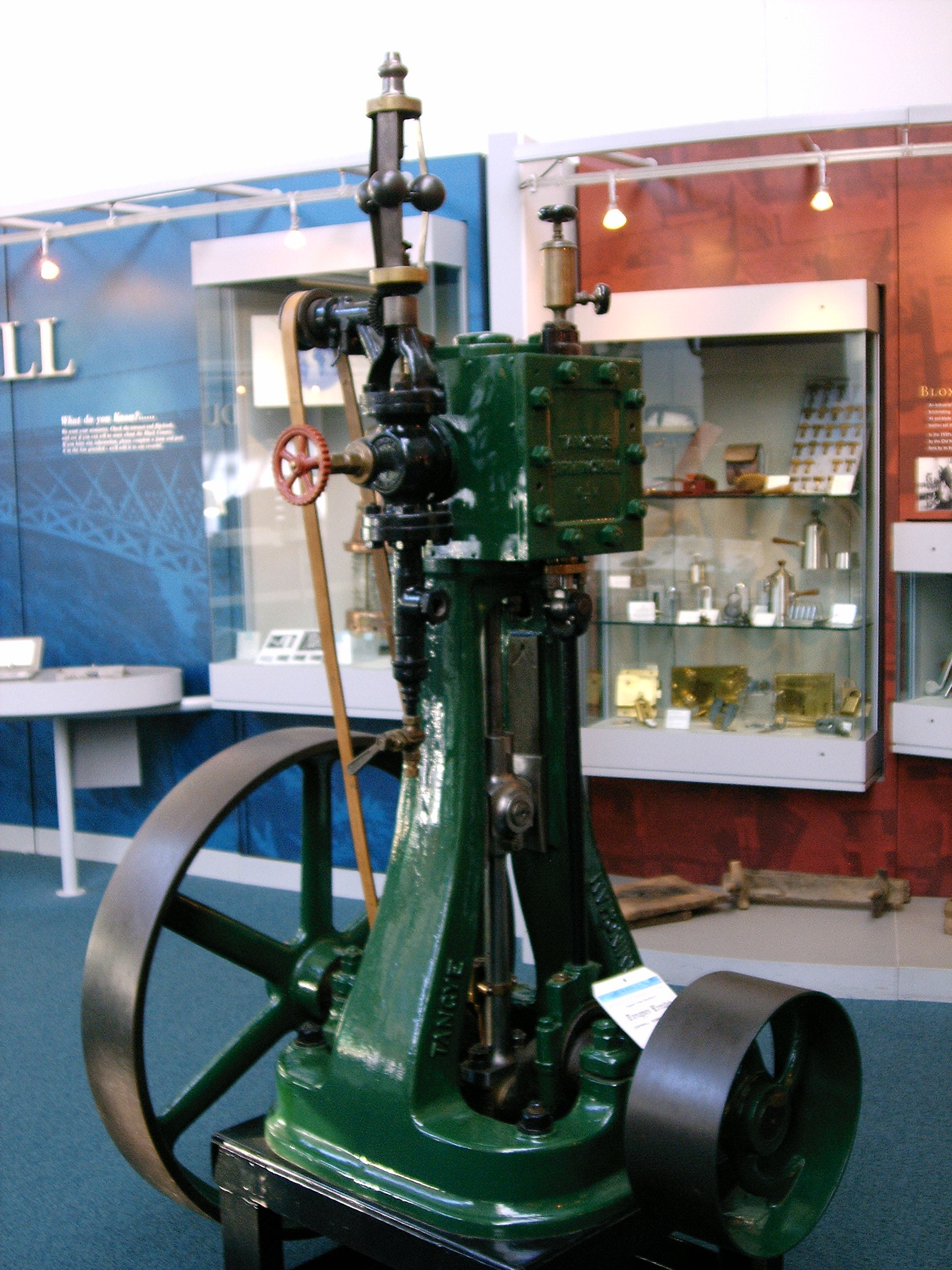
Tangye stationary engine on display in Exhibition Hall One.

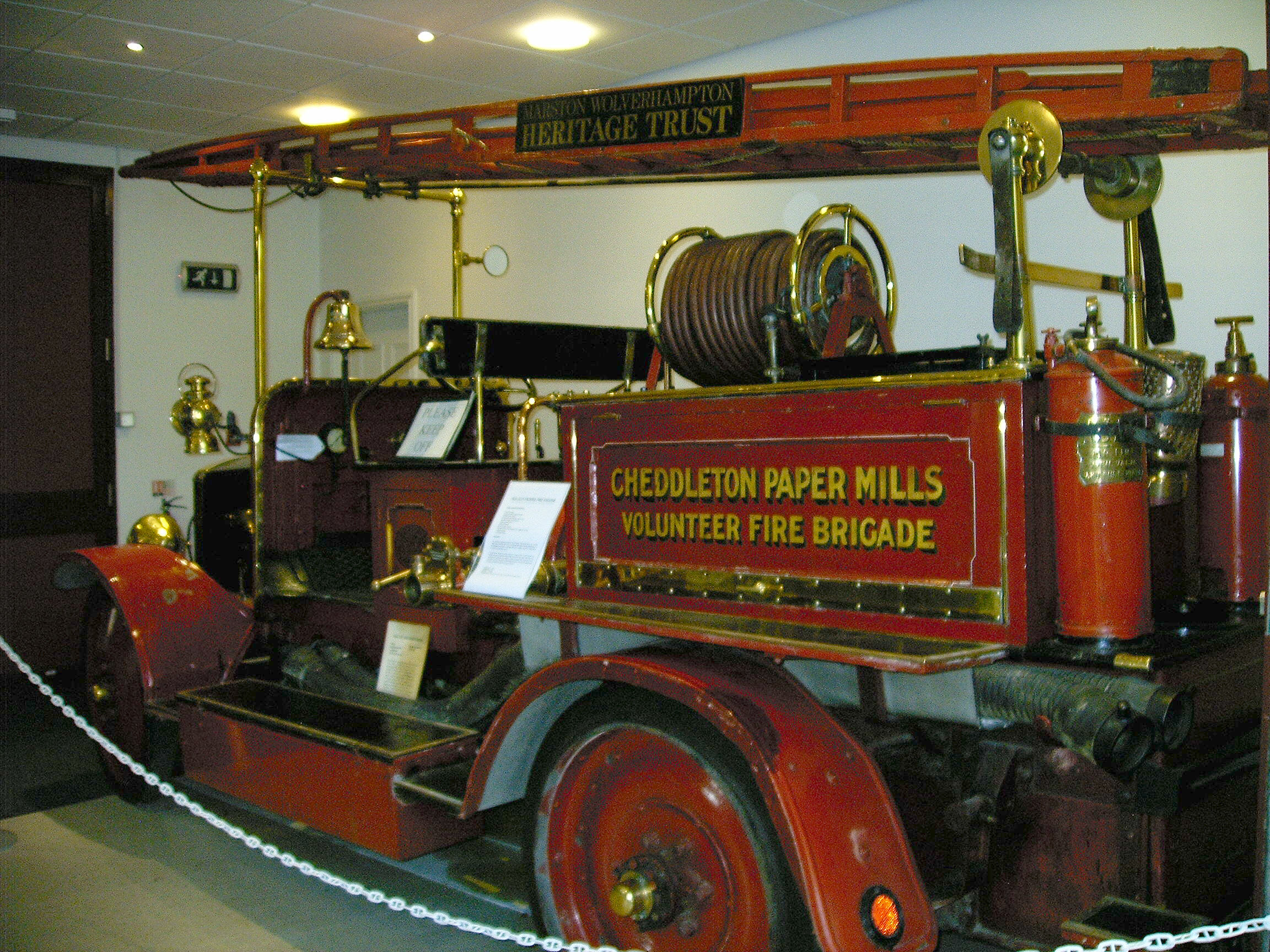
Early fire engine, probably made at the John Marston Co. Ltd. factory in Wolverhampton, which made Sunbeam cars and motor cycles.

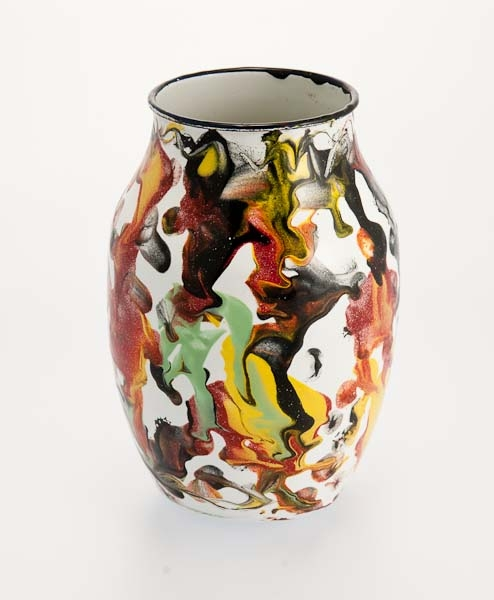
Regina Enamelware was locally manufactured in Lye.

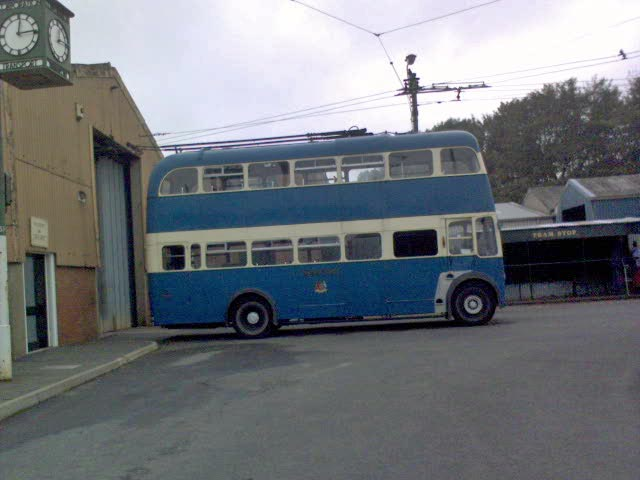
A trolleybus at the museum

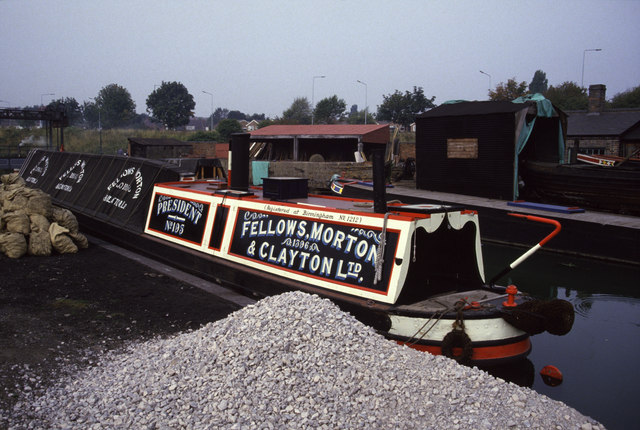
1909-built Fellows Morton & Clayton steam narrowboat President, preserved in working order and based at the museum

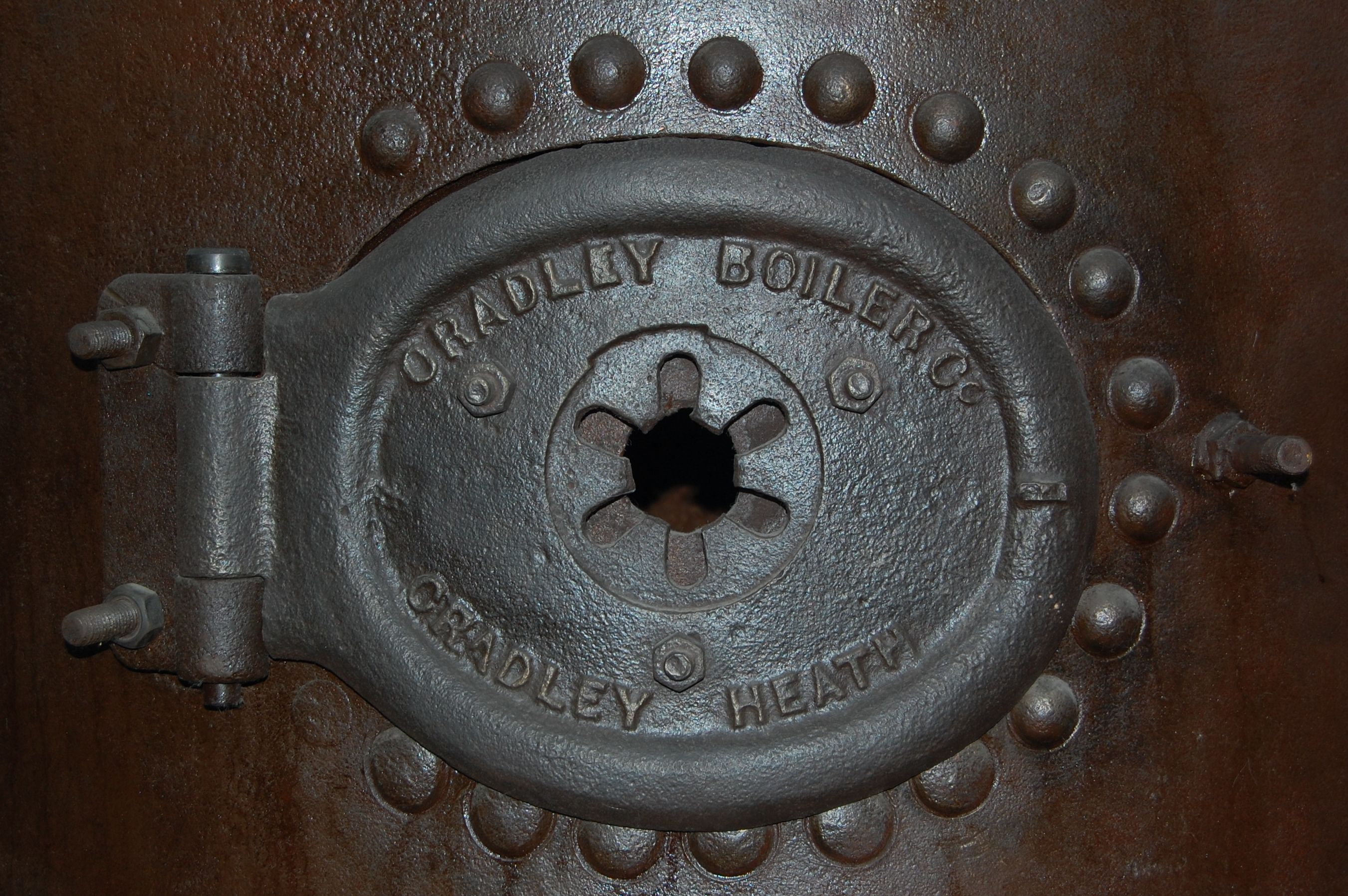
Detail of a boiler manufactured by the Cradley Boiler Co. of Cradley Heath, on display at the museum

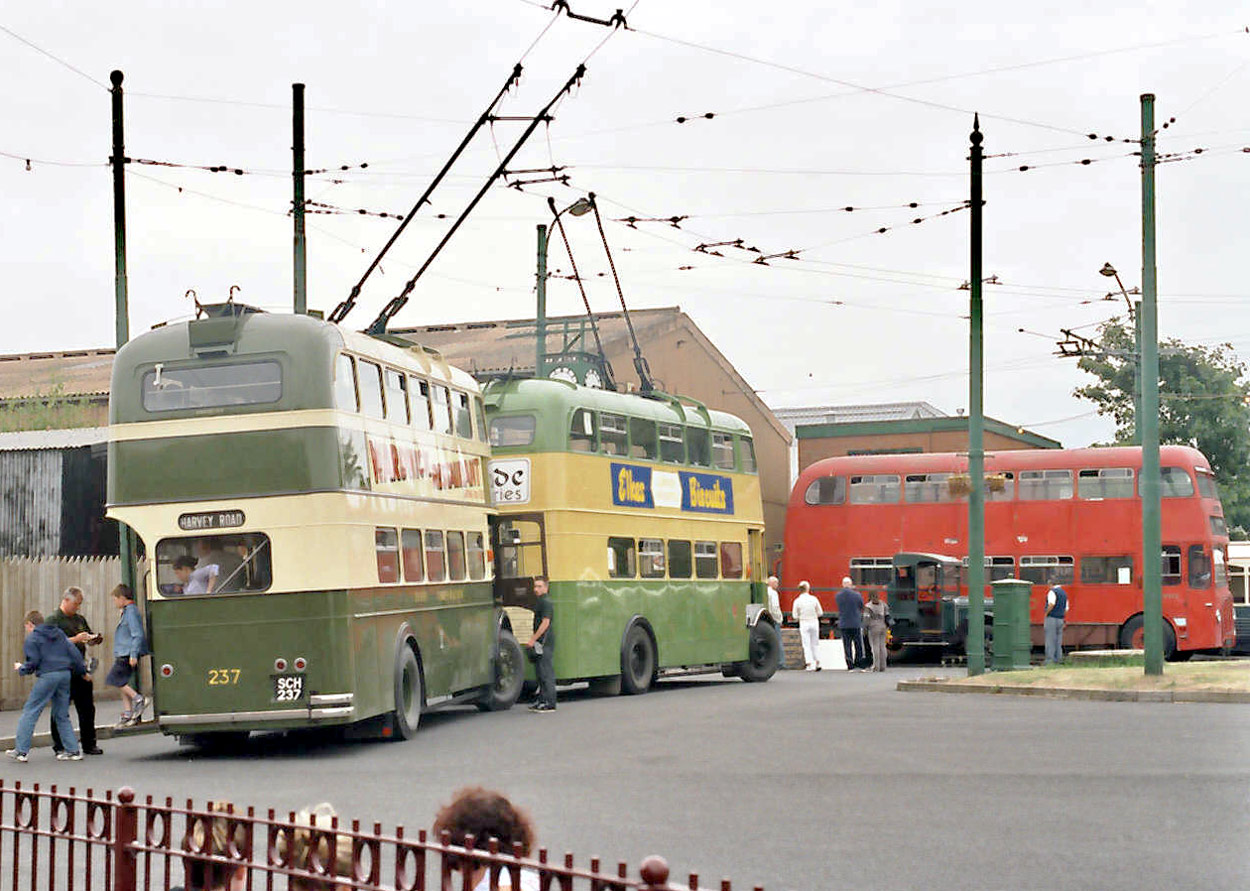
Trolleybuses at the museum. The rear (dark green and cream) vehicle is from Derby and the front (light green and yellow) vehicle is from Wolverhampton. The red bus in the distance is a BMMO motor bus.

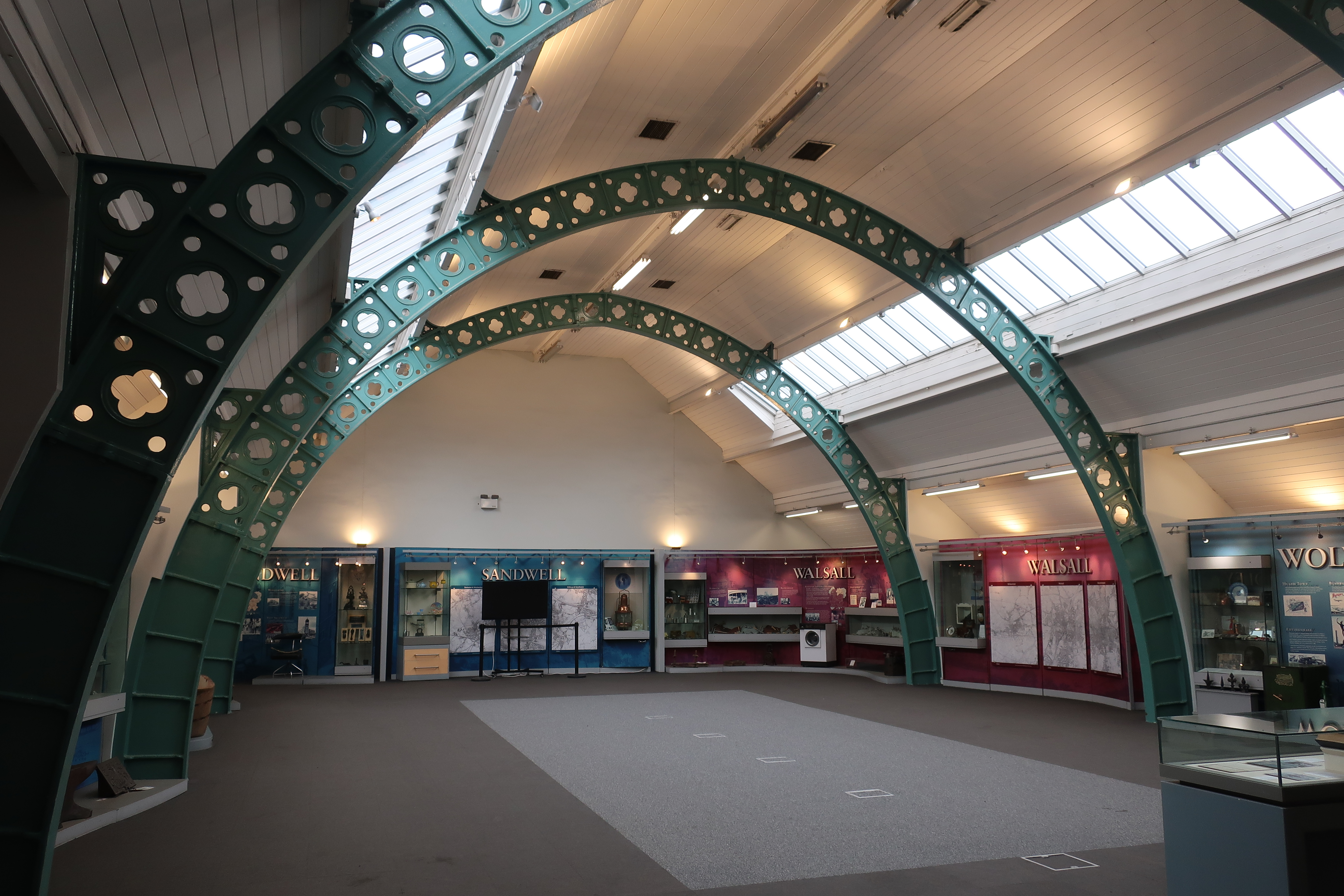
Exhibition Hall: the iron trusses are from the former Rolfe Street public baths, Smethwick, built 1888, designed by Harris, Martin & Harris

== Public transport access ==
The nearest railway station is Tipton railway station served by local Wolverhampton to Walsall via Birmingham Trains. The station is approximately 2 minutes journey by bus on the 229 service although the bus stops a short walk from the station in Owen Street.

Bus services 11/11A (Walsall to Dudley via Wednesbury) and Diamond Bus service 229 (Bilston to Dudley via Sedgley and Tipton) pass the museum on a regular daily basis.

Currently under construction is an extension to the Midland Metro tram system which will initially run between the current line in Wednesbury and Dudley town centre. A stop will be provided near the museum.
