= Thomas Oliver (engineer) =

English engineer and inventor

Thomas Oliver was an engineer who invented the first machine for forging bolts in England. This used a treadle-operated hammer which was called an Oliver hammer or English Oliver, after the inventor. Production of bolts using this machinery started in Darlaston in Staffordshire in 1838. Similar machines were still in use in the Black Country in 1979 at Lench's Oliver Shop, making special bolts to order. Using such a hammer could be strenuous work, stamping on the treadle to force the red hot iron into the die over a thousand times a day. Despite the physical strain and injury which resulted, even women laboured in this way during the 19th century.
