= Bristol Packet Boat Trips =

Bristol Packet Boat Trips Limited
- Trade name: Bristol Packet
- Industry: Boat trips and excursions
- Founded: Bristol, England (1973)
- Headquarters: Wapping Wharf, Bristol; BS1 6UN
- Website: bristolpacket.co.uk

Bristol Packet Boat Trips is a limited company offering public and charter excursions in Bristol Harbour and on the River Avon. The company has four boats: the river launch Tower Belle, narrowboat Redshank, glass-topped Bagheera and locally built Flower of Bristol. The company also has an interest in Bristol Hydrogen Boats which has commissioned and built a hydrogen powered ferry boat.

== History ==
The Bristol Packet was founded in 1973 by Nick and Corrina Gray. At that time there were no passenger boats operating in the city docks or on the river Avon, the last services had been offered by the Kingstonian in the 1960s. The docks were semi-derelict and there were few visitors. Trips were initially offered around the docks on the narrowboat Redshank, which along with her accompanying butty Greenshank, had been brought from the Midlands by the Grays. Nick offered "interesting, anecdotal commentaries which added some depth and interest to the trips", according to the Bristol Post.

In 1976 the river launch Tower Belle was brought to Bristol enabling trips upstream to Hanham and downstream to the Avon Gorge. Avon Gorge trips had not been available to the public since the demise of P & A Campbells in the 1970s. The Grays eventually sold the company in 1980. Tickets for boat trips were sold from a 1910 showman's wagon at Wapping Wharf.

In 1995, The Bristol Packet commenced operations on the Flower of Bristol, enabling a further extension of the evening charter business. The most recent addition, in 2002, to the company's fleet was Amsterdam built sightseeing boat Bagheera.

== Boats ==
=== Redshank ===
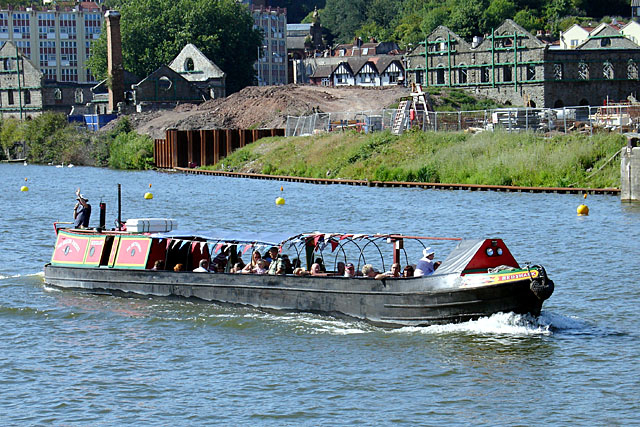
Narrowboat Redshank on the Floating Harbour

Redshank is a traditional English narrowboat, built in 1936 by W. J. Yarwood & Sons in Northwich, Cheshire. The original name was Reading and she was operated by the Grand Union Canal Carrying Company. In the 1950s, she was acquired by the Willow Wren Canal Carrying Company, who renamed her as Redshank.

=== Tower Belle ===
Tower Belle started life as a river launch named the Wincomblee on the Tyne, built in 1920 by Armstrong Whitworth. After the Second World War, she worked on the Thames, before she was brought to Bristol in 1976.

=== Flower of Bristol ===
Flower of Bristol was built by Abels Shipbuilders in the Albion Dockyard, Bristol in 1980 for Avon River Cruises, and was acquired by the Bristol Packet in the late 1995.

=== Bagheera ===
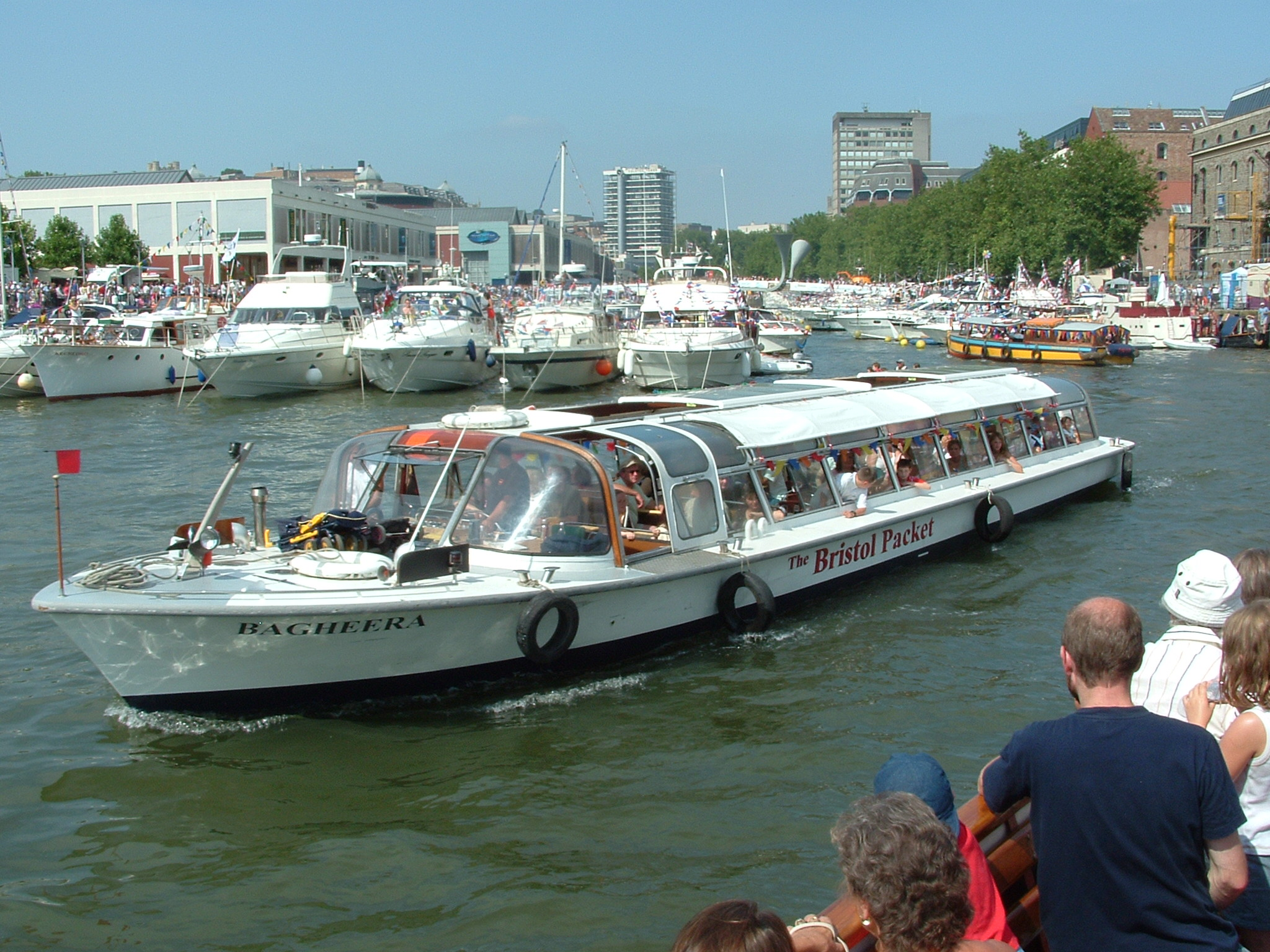
Bagheera City Docks

Bagheera is a glass-topped tourist boat, built in Amsterdam in 1973. She was acquired from a company in Ghent, Belgium that offered canal cruises to Antwerp Zoo. She had also worked previously in Switzerland and the Netherlands.

== Bristol Hydrogen Boats ==
Bristol Hydrogen Boats is a consortium of three companies: Number Seven Boat Trips, Auriga Energy and the Bristol Packet. With aid of a grant of £250,000 from Bristol City Council, they have built a hydrogen powered ferry boat, named Hydrogenesis. This started operations in the spring of 2013 and is claimed to be "Britain's first hydrogen-powered ferry". It operated as a public ferry for 6 months, but fuel was expensive, and the boat was transferred to Bristol Packet for private hire.
