= Wooden Canal Boat Society =

English charity

The Wooden Canal Boat Society (WCBS) is a waterway society and a registered charity in England, UK, based at Ashton-under-Lyne, Greater Manchester. The society started as the Wooden Canal Craft Trust in 1987, and by 1995 the trust owned six boats; it was wound up in 1997, and its assets were handed over to the WCBS.

== History ==
The society aims to preserve wooden working boats, and its fleet of six wooden boats is moored at Portland Basin at the confluence of the Ashton Canal, the Peak Forest Canal and the Huddersfield Narrow Canal, known to boaters as Dukinfield Junction.

The society's oldest boat is Lilith, a working boat which was 100 years old in December 2001. Lilith is a butty, i.e. a narrowboat without an engine, destined to be towed, or hauled, by another boat. Lilith was also a Birmingham "joey" boat, and No. 9 in Stewarts' and Lloyds' fleet.

Forget-Me-Not was built in 1927 as a horse-drawn boat for Henry Grantham who was a "Number One" (owner boatman). The boat was used to carry coal from Coventry to the Grand Union Canal, but from 1959 she became a houseboat.

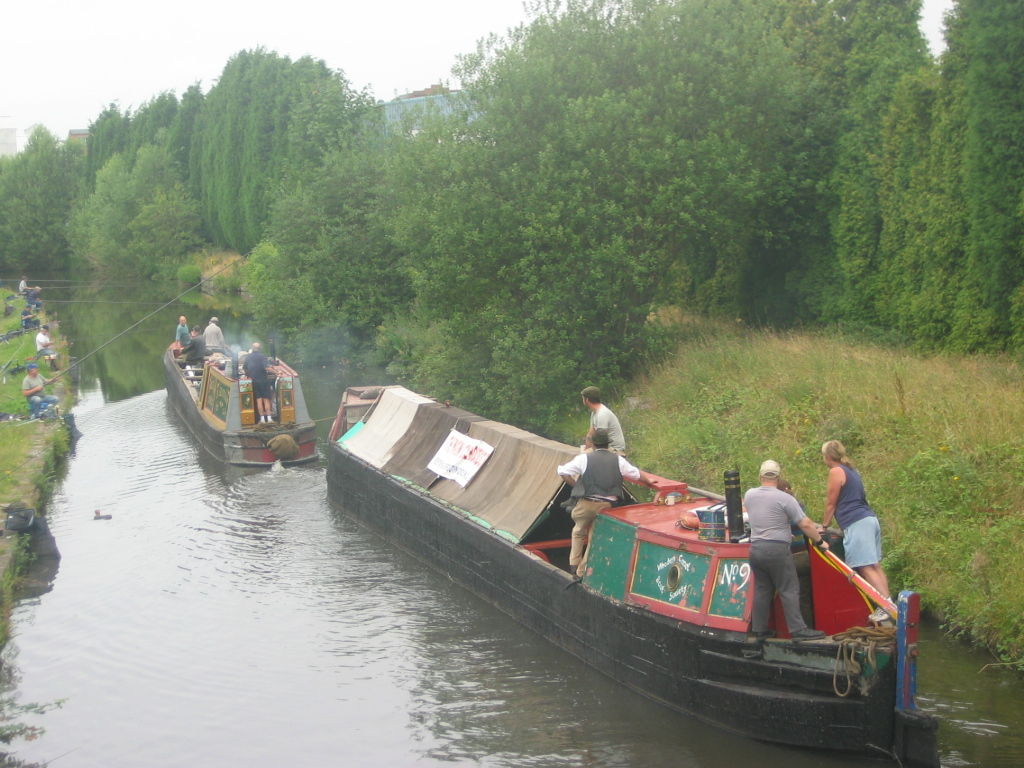

Hazel is the last surviving full length example of a Runcorn wooden header, built in 1914 to trade on the Bridgewater Canal. From 1929 she was owned by Number One Agnes Beech. Subsequently, she served as a comfortable home to several families.

Queen, built in 1917, was originally named Walsall Queen and is the oldest surviving wooden motorised narrowboat.

Elton and Southam were donated by British Waterways as an alternative to being scrapped. Southam is one of a fleet of 62 wooden butties (known as "big rickies") built for the Grand Union Canal Carrying Company in the 1930s at Rickmansworth.

== Present and future ==
To help with the unending task of repairing and maintaining the society's wooden boat fleet, Tameside Council made available a piece of land to serve as a boatyard. Heritage Lottery funding was obtained, and the 80-foot (24 m) boatyard frontage will be completed. Future plans include the erection of a visitor and education centre from which visitors and school students will be able to observe the restoration work on the narrowboats.

In September 2015 Hazel completed some trial voyages as she neared restoration. She has been fitted with disable-friendly features such as a wheelchair ramp and lift to the living area. In the future she will be used as a "wellbeing boat", offering respite days and residential trips for people with mental health issues.

== Gallery ==
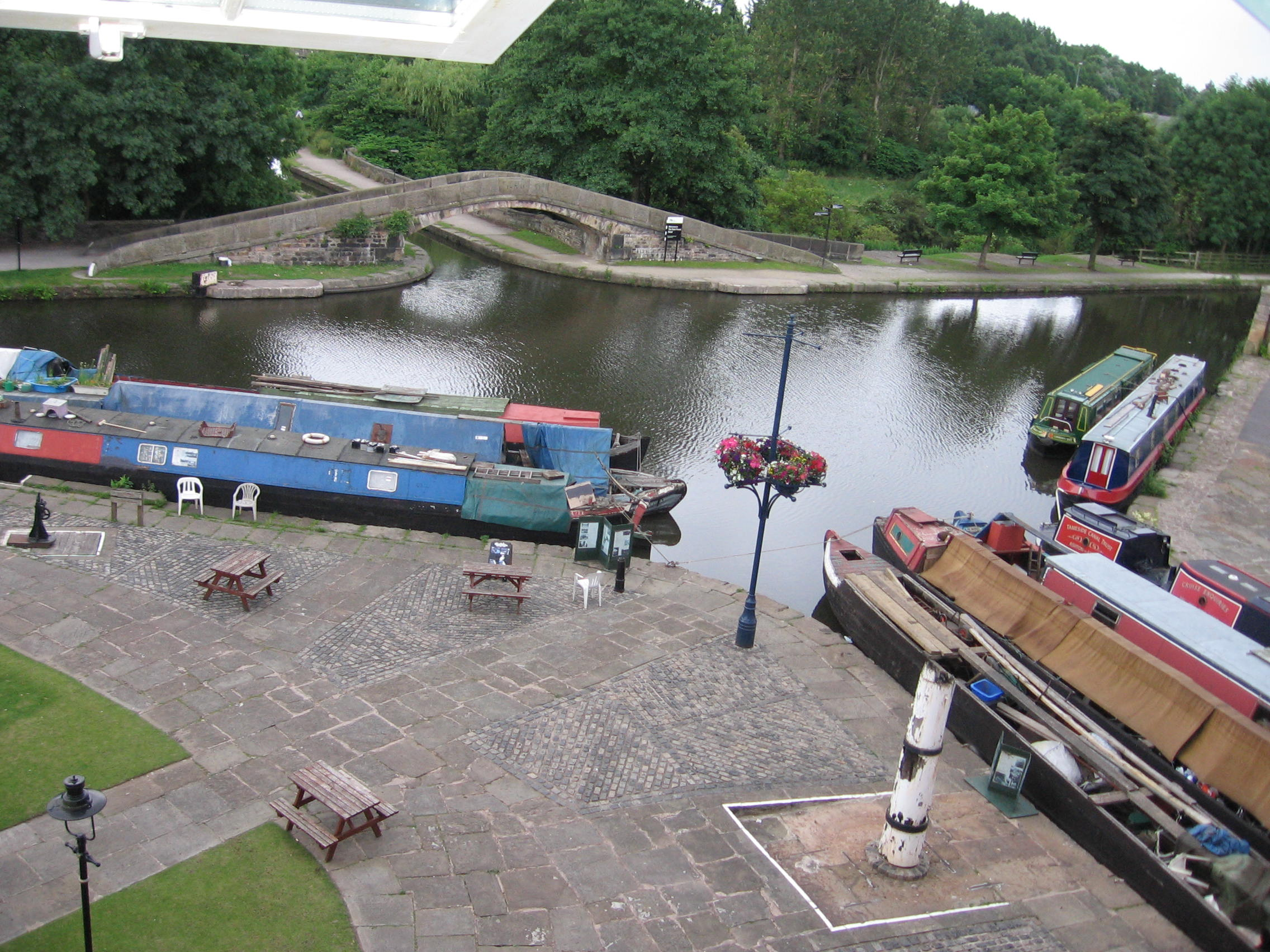
Portland basin, viewed from the flats

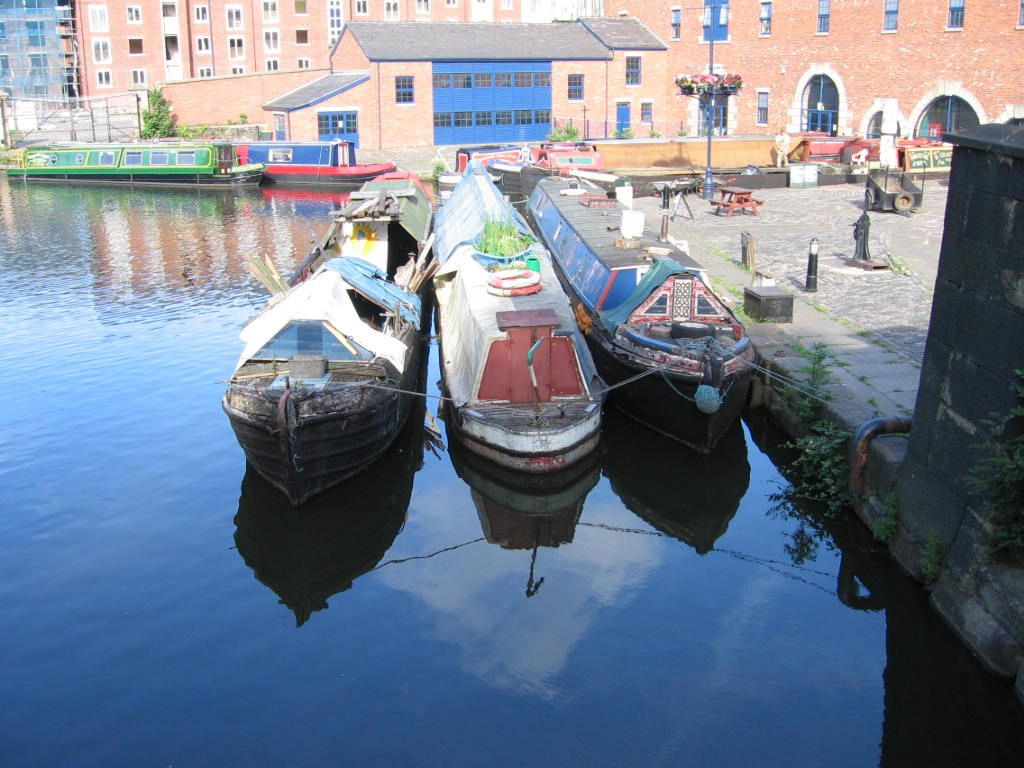
Wooden narrow boats, Portland Basin, Ashton-under-Lyne

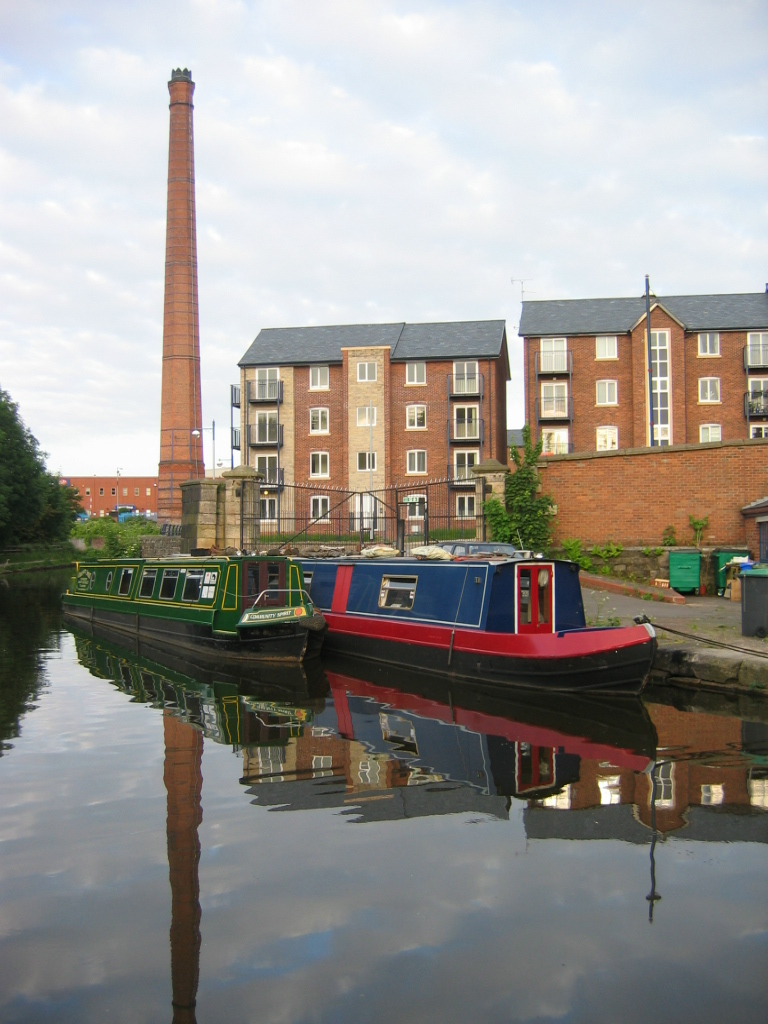
Portland Basin, Ashton Canal, Ashton-under-Lyne

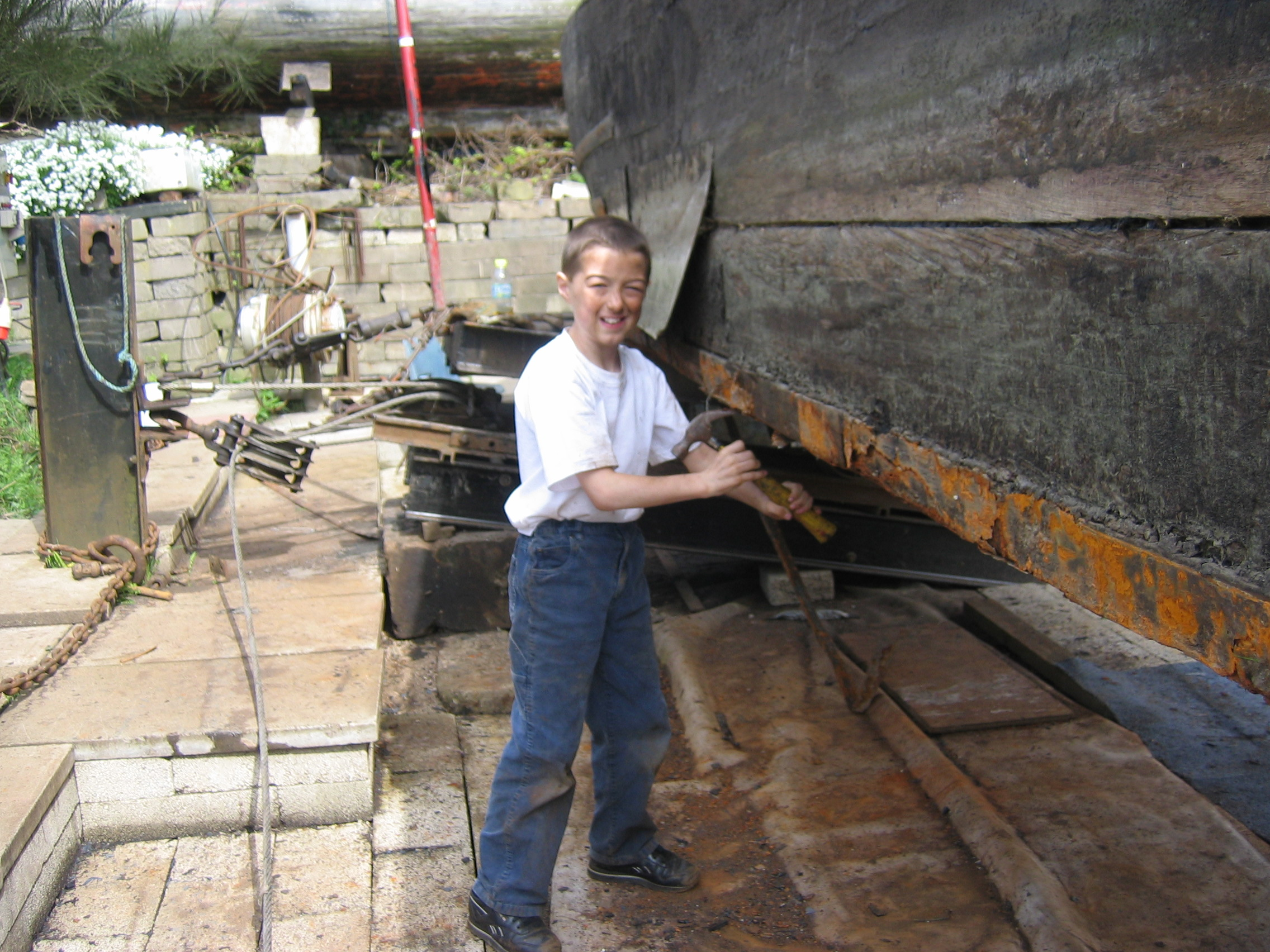
Maintaining Forget-Me-Not

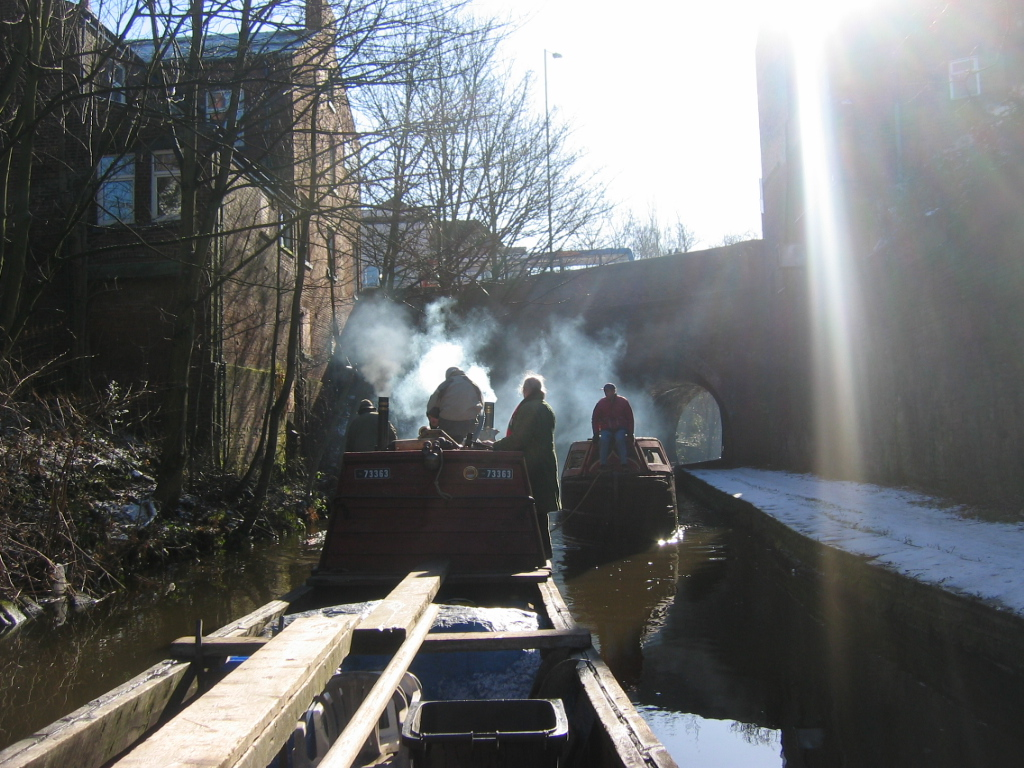
Wooden boat convoy picking up recyclables on Ashton Canal

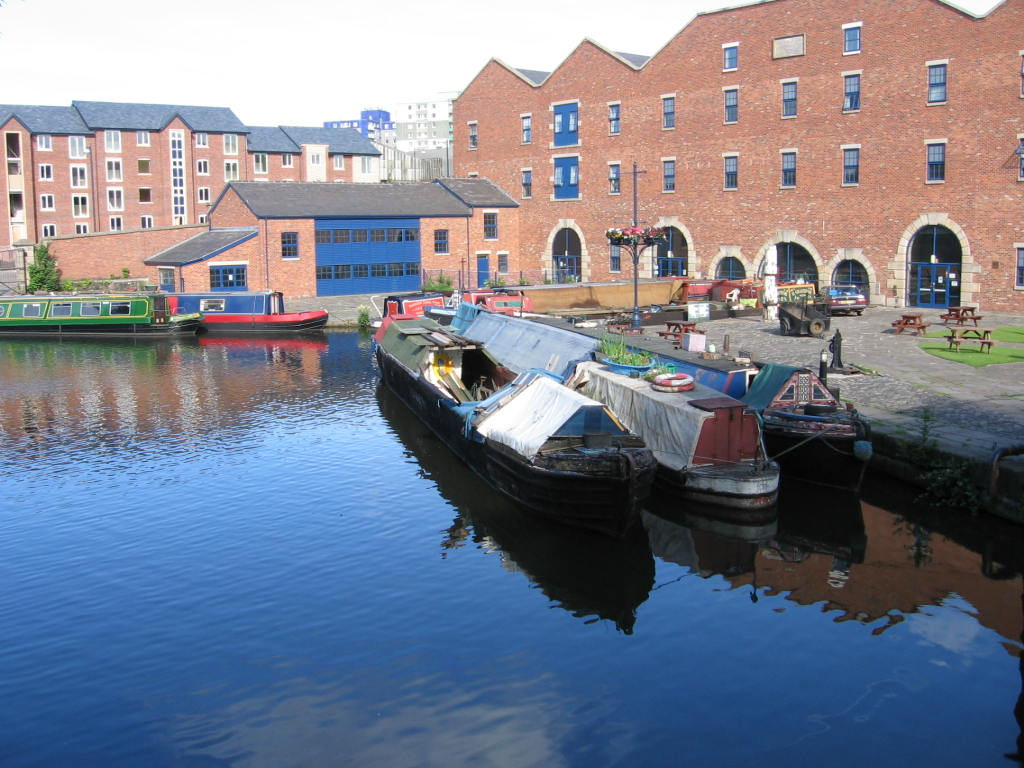
Former canal warehouse, Portland Basin, now museum and flats

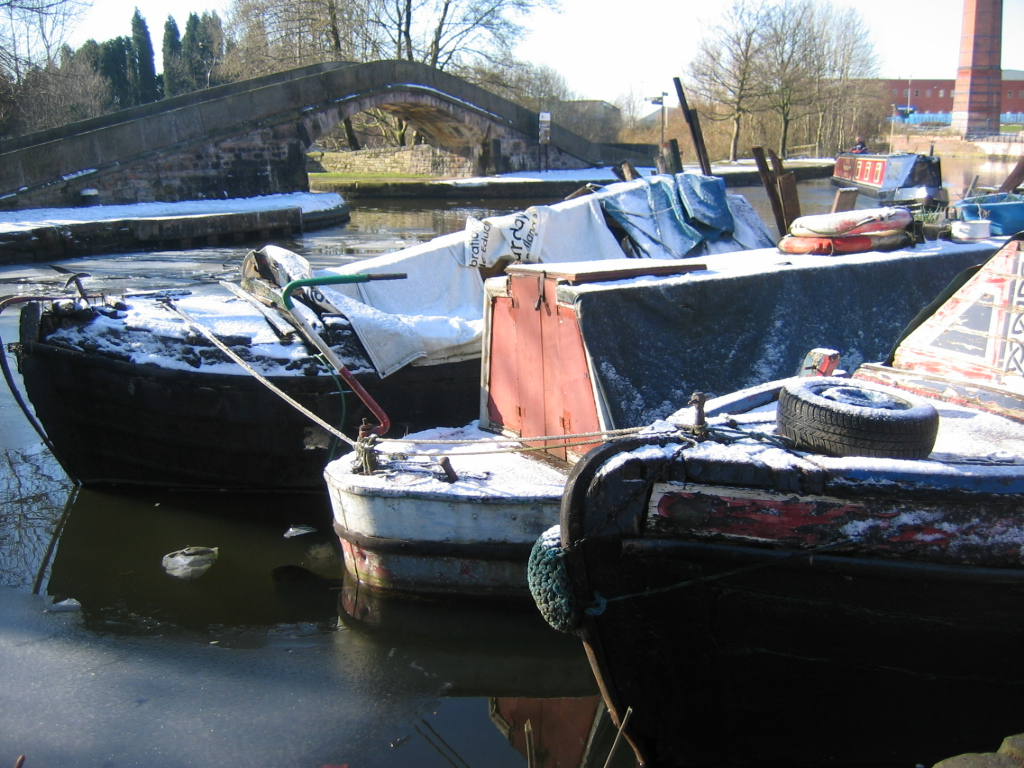
Winter at the basin

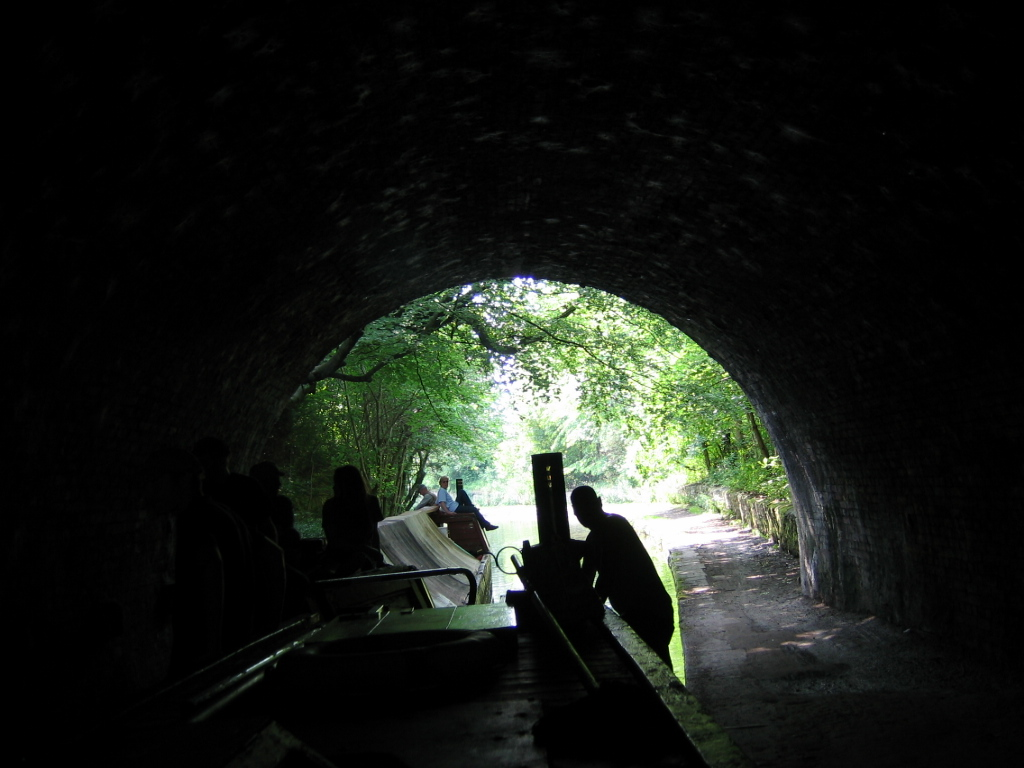
Forget-me-Not and Lilith through tunnel

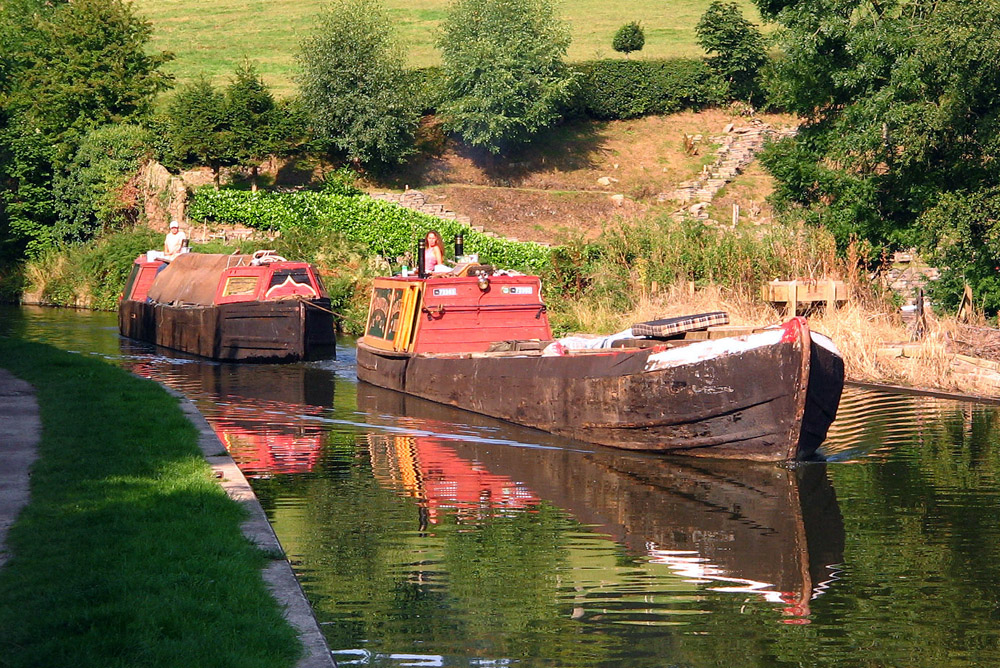
Forget-me-Not pulling Lilith on the Macclesfield Canal

== See also ==
- List of waterway societies in the United Kingdom
- Horse-drawn boats
- Horseboating Society
