= President (narrowboat) =

Particular steam-powered narrowboat

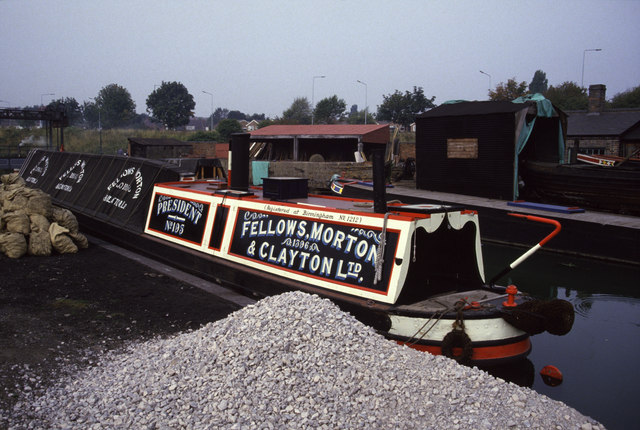
- President in 1986

History
- Name: President
- Owner: Fellows Morton & Clayton
- Operator: Fellows Morton & Clayton
- Port of registry: Birmingham 1212
- Builder: Fellows Morton & Clayton
- Cost: £600 (equivalent to £79,000 in 2023)
- Launched: 1909
- Name: President
- Owner: Nicholas Bostock and Malcolm Braine
- Acquired: 1973
- Refit: 1973-78
- Name: President
- Owner: Black Country Living Museum
- Acquired: 1983
- Home port: Lord Ward's Arm Dudley Canal

General characteristics
- Type: Narrowboat
- Length: 71.54 ft (21.81 m)
- Beam: 6.98 ft (2.13 m)
- Draught: 3.21 ft (0.98 m)
- Installed power: Steam

President is a historic, steam-powered narrowboat, built in 1909 by Fellows Morton & Clayton (FMC) at their dock at Saltley, Birmingham, England. It is now owned by the Black Country Living Museum, where it is based. President is registered by National Historic Ships as part of the National Historic Fleet.

== Early years ==
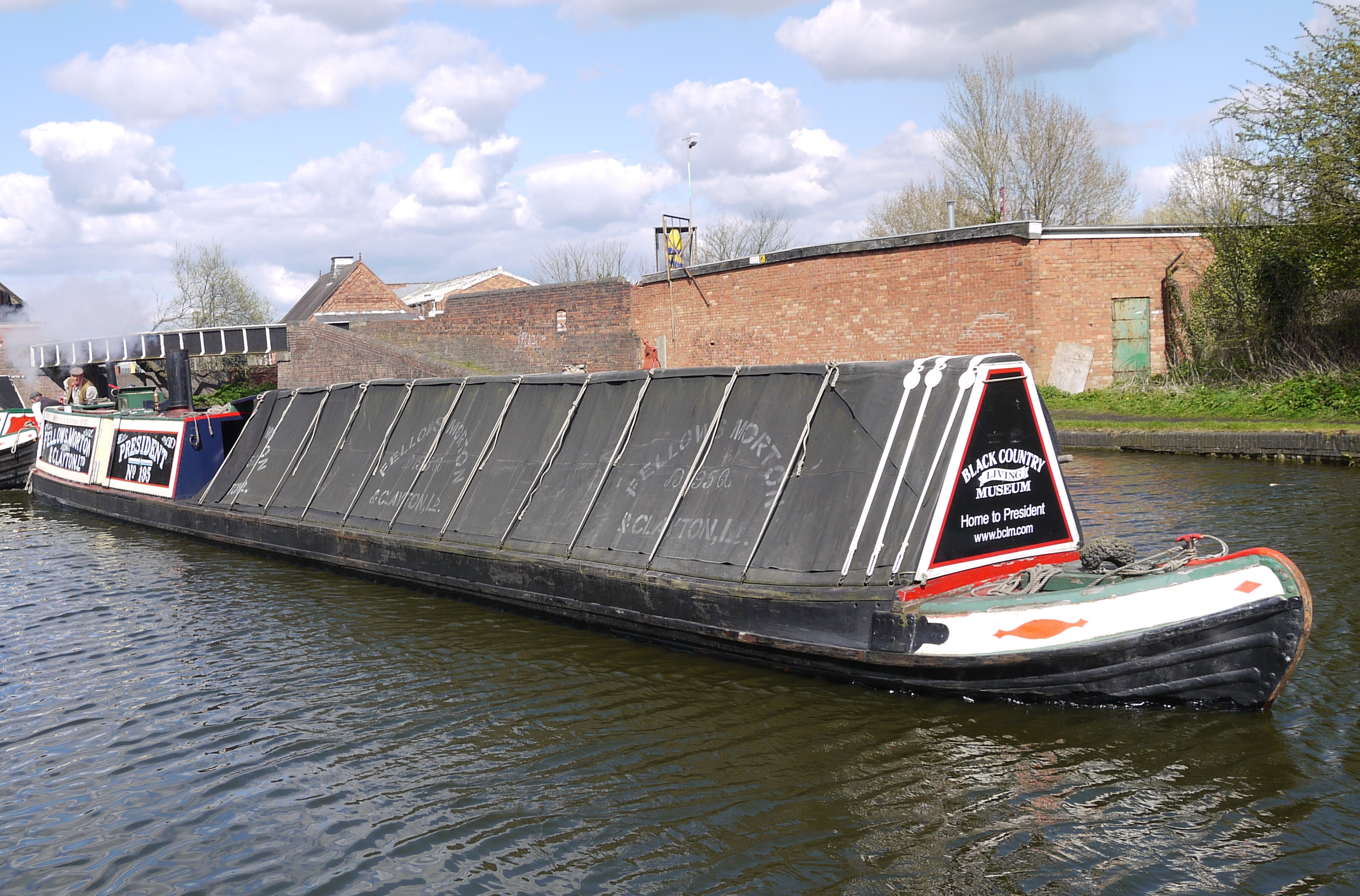
President on the BCN Old Main Line

The 71 feet (22 m) long President was constructed in 1909 at FMC's company dock in Saltley, and cost £600 (equivalent to £79,000 in 2023). She was registered on 23 June that year. Her riveted, wrought iron hull is shaped in the 'Josher' style, named for FMC director Joshua Fellows.

In 1925, the Ruston, Proctor and Company steam boiler and engine were replaced by a 15 hp Bolinder crude oil engine.

Ernest Thomas, a director of FMC, and a Walsall-based coal carrier, acquired the boat in 1946. She was sold to George and Matthews of Wolverhampton in 1948, but that year the UK's canals were nationalised and she finished her working days as part of British Waterways' northern maintenance fleet, on the Trent and Mersey, Macclesfield and Shropshire Union canals, from a base at Northwich.

== Preservation ==
President was bought by Nicholas Bostock and Malcolm Braine in 1973, as a derelict hull. They restored the hull and constructed a replica cabin and boiler room. A 1928 Muir and Findley "Scotch" return boiler, similar to that originally used, but operating at 100 PSI was acquired and fitted, as was a twin cylinder steam engine, originally used in a Thames launch. The boat returned to service in 1978.

== Black Country Living Museum ==
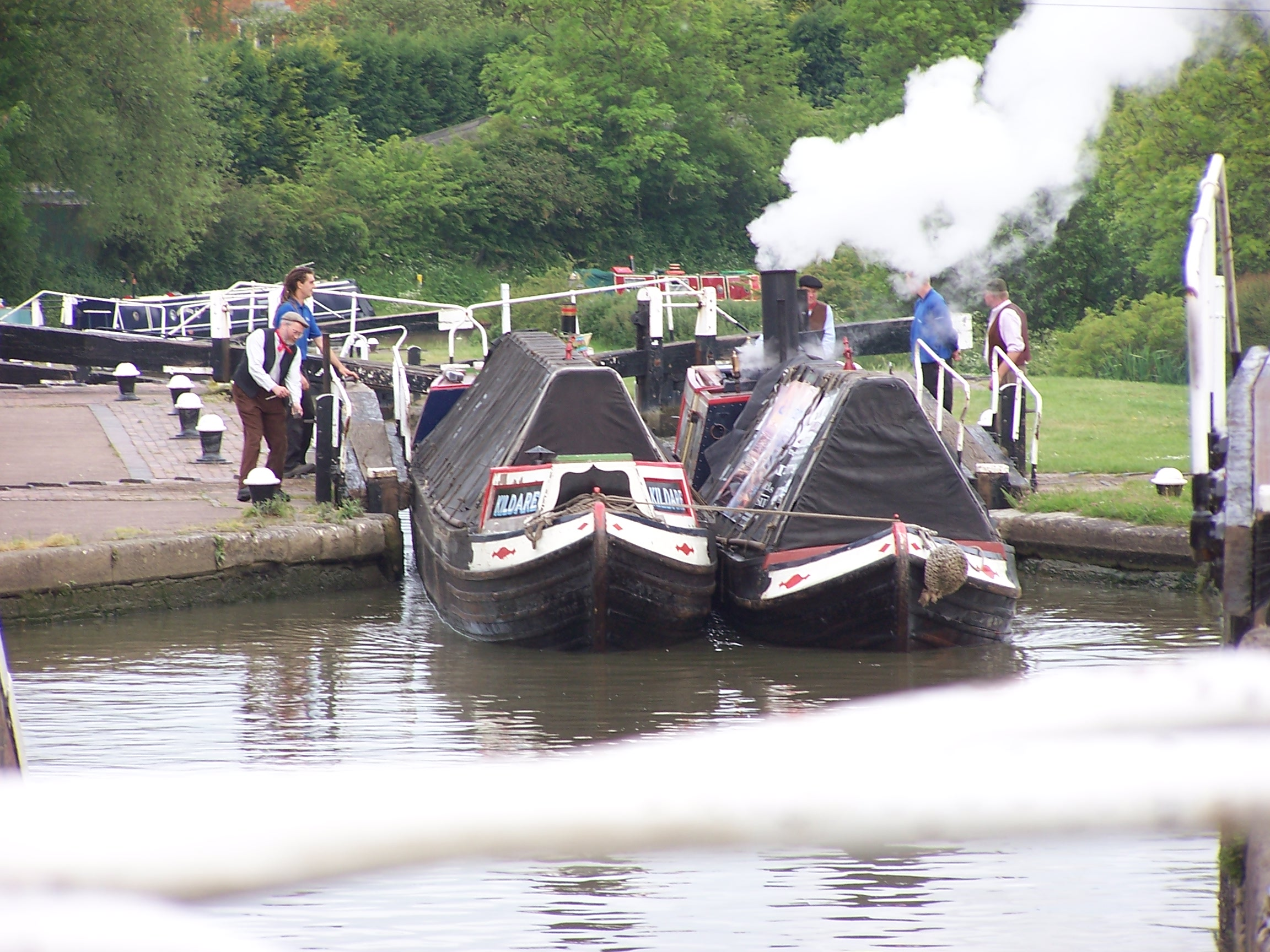
NB President and Kildare – Soulbury Locks

President was purchased by the Black Country Living Museum in January 1983. The boiler was replaced by a Cochran dryback return flue boiler in 1990. A major refit took place from 2001 to 2003, including the provision of a new steam engine, pipework and cabin, plus major hull repairs.

President, in FMC livery, normally operates with a butty boat, Kildare. In 1992 she paired with Kildare on a 257 mile journey through Cheshire and Staffordshire to raise money for orphaned children in Romania.

On 3 June 2012, President took part in the Thames Diamond Jubilee Pageant in London, representing the Lord-Lieutenant of Staffordshire, having spent three weeks making the journey from Etruria Industrial Museum, Stoke-on-Trent, at an average speed of 3 mph.

Her boiler failed an inspection in 2018 and is beyond economical repair.

== Bibliography ==
- Ratcliffe, Neil J. (May 2009). Steam Narrow Boat "President": The First Hundred Years. Black Country Museum Trust Ltd. ISBN 0956203108.
