= MV Safe Hand =

The steam barge LUX was built and engined by W. J. Yarwood & Sons in Northwich for Lever Brothers. It entered service in 1950, and carried a variety of edible oils in two deck mounted tanks.

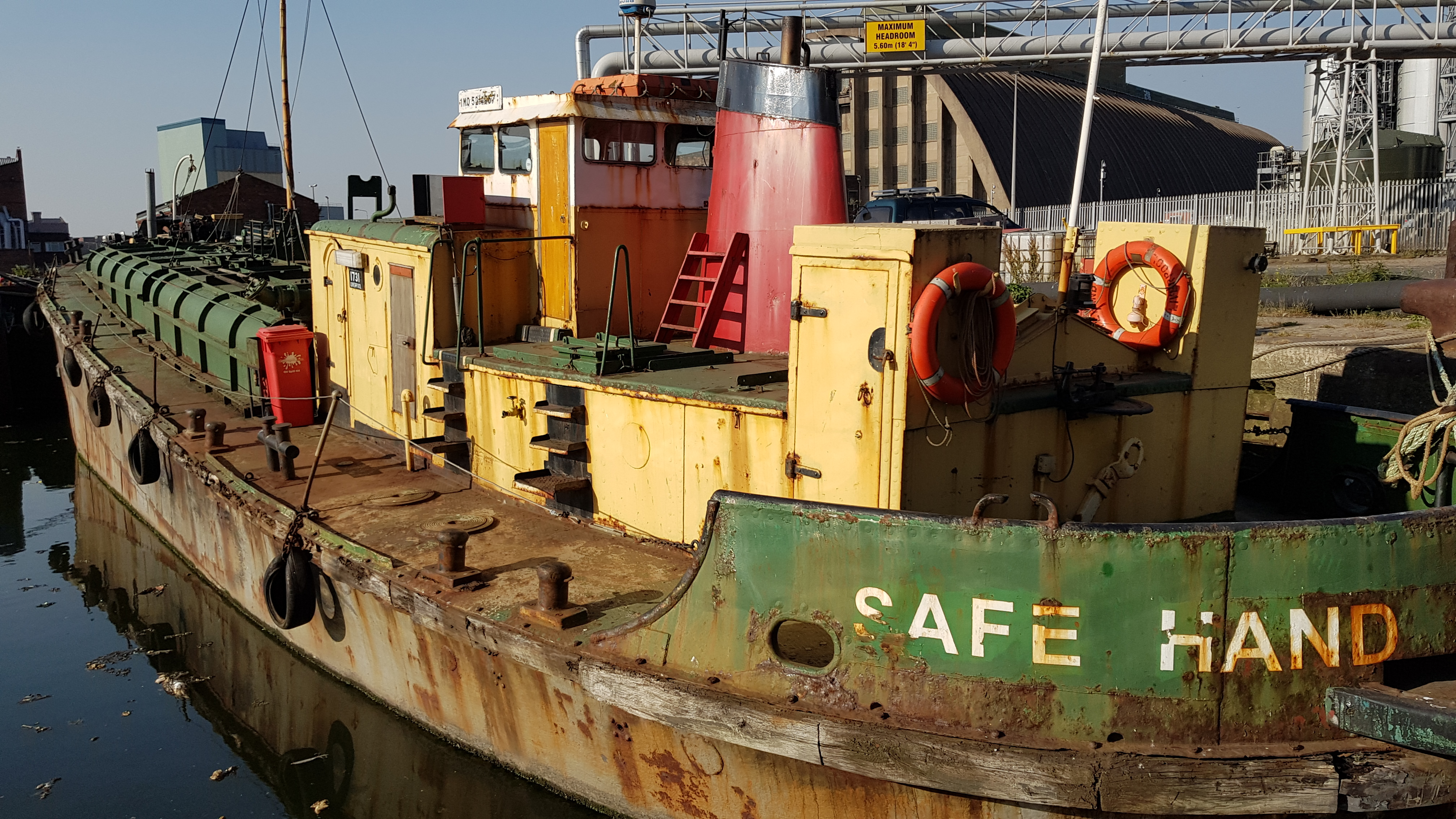

In 1966, the steam power-plant was upgraded with a Kelvin T8 diesel engine. As some cargoes required heating, a small steam generator was installed, feeding heating coils in each bottom of each tank.

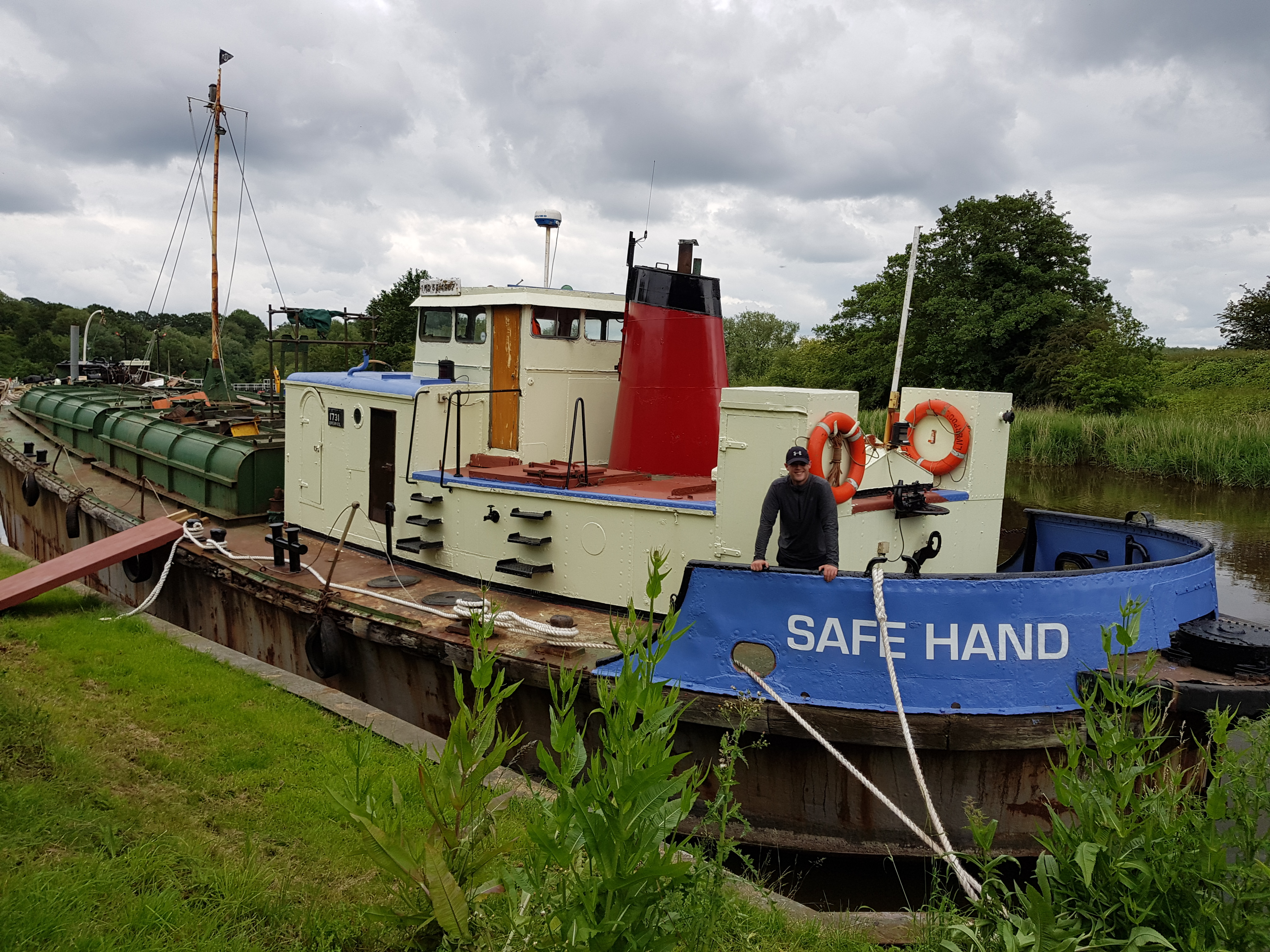

Renamed to SAFE HAND in 1975, and becoming part of the National Historic Fleet in 1998. this barge remained in commercial operation until 2018. Currently in private ownership and undergoing restoration.

- LOA - 100.16 feet (30.55 m)
- Beam - 22.92 feet (6.99 m)
