= Kildare (narrowboat) =

Canal boat of the United Kingdom

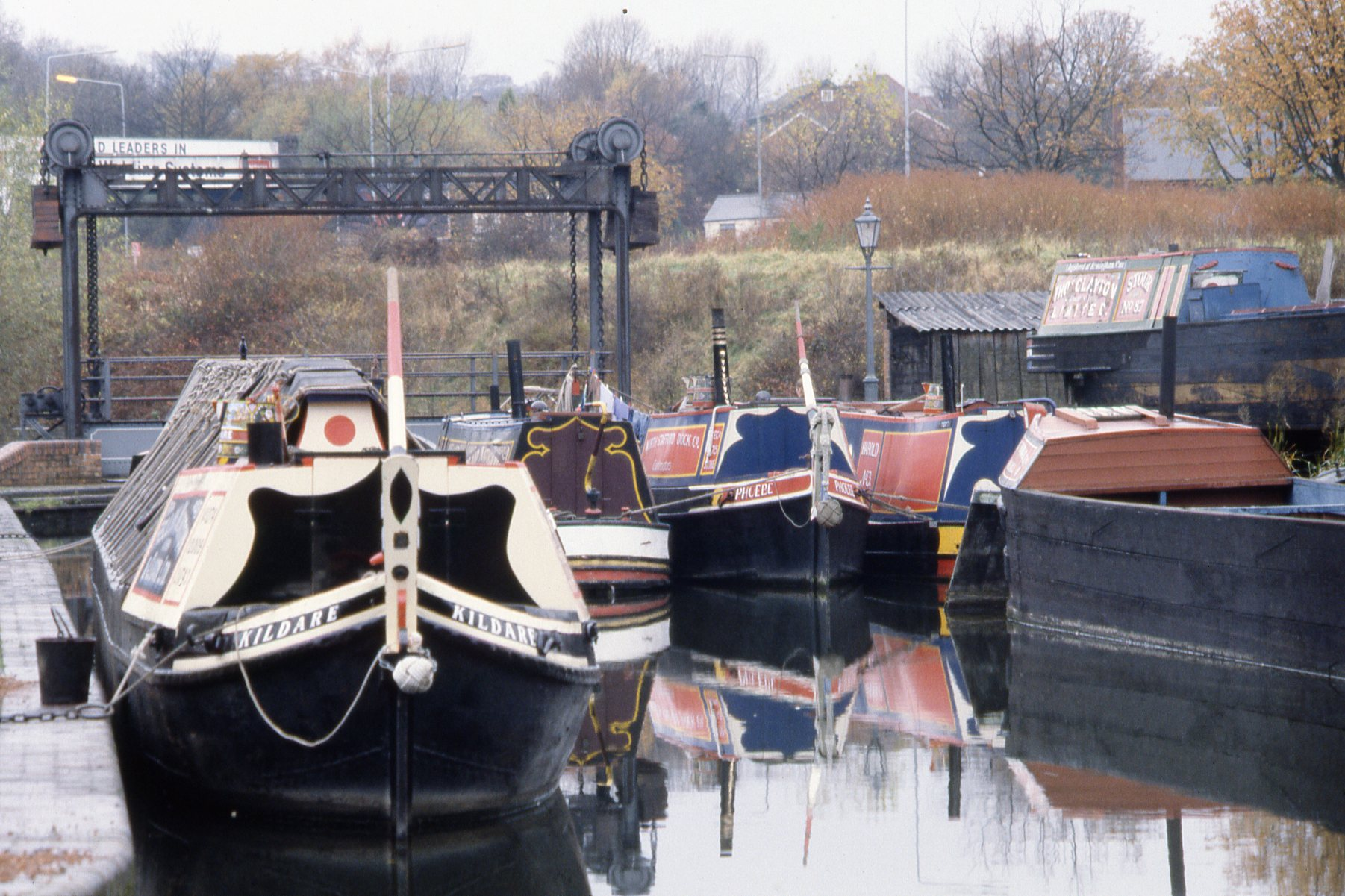
- Kildare at the Black Country Museum

History
- Name: Kildare
- Owner: Fellows Morton & Clayton
- Operator: Fellows Morton & Clayton
- Builder: Braitwaite & Kirk
- Cost: £190 (equivalent to £19,000 in 2025)
- Launched: 1913
- Name: Snipe
- Owner: Willow Wren Canal Carrying Company
- Acquired: 1957
- Name: Kildare
- Owner: Warwickshire Fly Boats
- Name: Kildare
- Owner: Black Country Living Museum
- Acquired: 1991
- Home port: Lord Ward's Arm Dudley Canal

General characteristics
- Type: Narrowboat
- Length: 71.60 ft (21.82 m)
- Beam: 6.11 ft (1.86 m)
- Draught: 3.4 ft (1.0 m)
- Installed power: Towed

Kildare is an un-powered butty boat constructed with wrought iron sides and an elm bottom. She was built for Fellows Morton & Clayton around 1913 by Braithwaite & Kirk of West Bromwich to be towed behind a powered craft like President. She is complete with a fully fitted boatman's living cabin and traditional covering cloths over the main hold area.

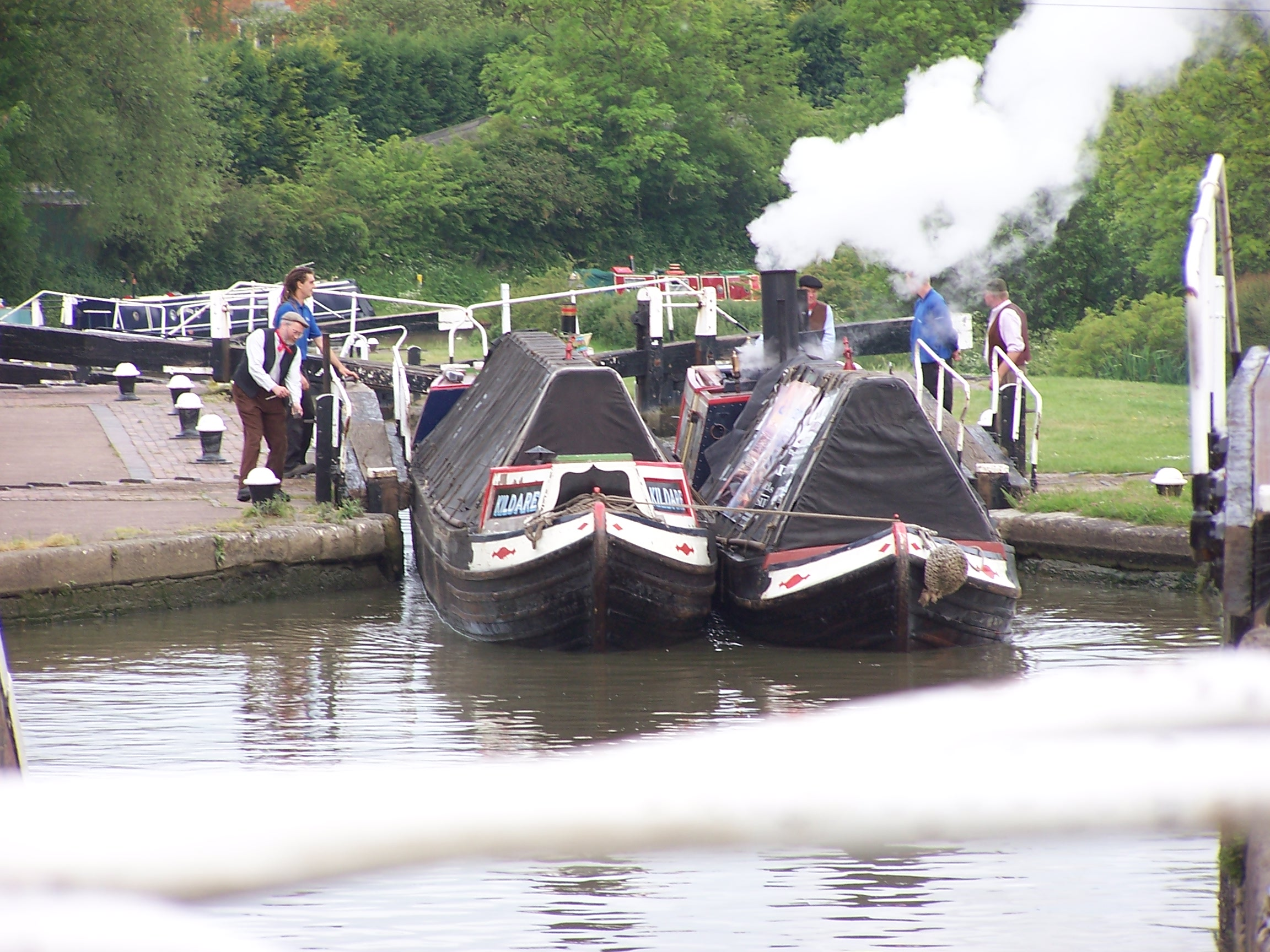
NB President and Kildare - Soulbury Locks

She continued to trade for Fellows Morton & Clayton until she was sold in 1948 to Ernie Thomas. Later she entered service in 1957 with Willow Wren Canal Carrying Company as Snipe. There were two more changes of ownership as Snipe, when she reverted to her original name on joining Warwickshire Fly Boat's fleet.

In 1991 she was obtained by the Black Country Living Museum, where it is based and can be seen dockside in the Lord Ward's Canal Arm at the Black Country Living Museum in Dudley when she is not out on the canal system with President .

The boat is maintained and operated by Friends of President on behalf of the Black Country Living Museum.

Kildare is on the National Historic Ships register.

In 1992 she paired with President on a 257-mile journey through Cheshire and Staffordshire to raise money for orphaned children in Romania.
