= Tower Belle =

Passenger boat based in Bristol, England

Coordinates: 51.4480°N 2.6194°W

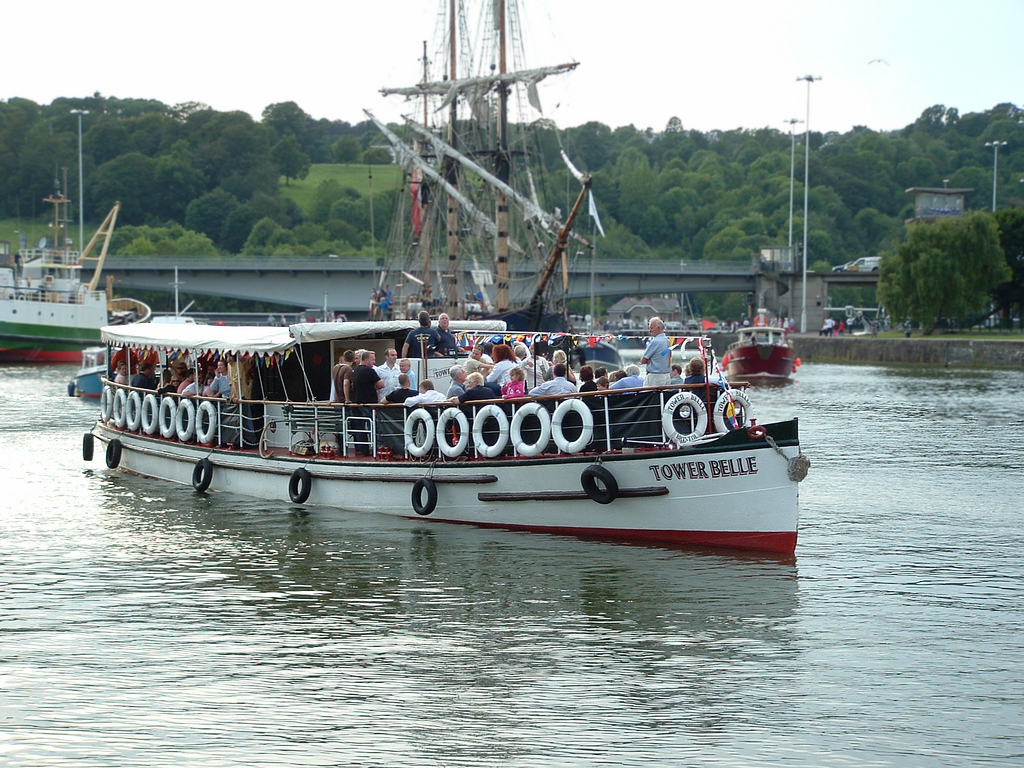
- Tower Belle in the Cumberland Basin

History

United Kingdom
- Name: Tower Belle
- Owner: Bristol Packet Boat Trips
- Operator: Bristol Packet Boat Trips
- Builder: Armstrong Whitworth, Newcastle upon Tyne
- Yard number: 882
- Christened: Wincomblee
- Completed: 1920
- Acquired: 1976
- Renamed: 1960
- Home port: Bristol
- Status: In service

General characteristics
- Type: River launch
- Tonnage: 32 GRT
- Length: 67.97 ft (20.72 m)
- Beam: 13 ft (4.0 m)
- Height: 12 ft (3.7 m)
- Draught: 2.83 ft (0.86 m)
- Propulsion: Diesel
- Speed: 10 knots
- Capacity: 95 passengers
- Crew: 3
- Notes: Mercantile Navy List number 144933

Tower Belle is a passenger boat based in Bristol Harbour in England. The vessel is operated by the Bristol Packet Boat Trips, offering pleasure and educational trips through the City Docks and along the River Avon to destinations such as the Chequers Inn at Hanham Lock and Beese's Tea Gardens at Conham. Tower Belle was built in 1920 in Newcastle upon Tyne by Armstrong Whitworth, originally known as Wincomblee. In the 1950s and 1960s she worked in London, finally coming to Bristol in 1976.

== History ==
Originally known as Wincomblee after a place in the Walker district of Newcastle, details of her early history are not known. She was operated by the Armstrong Whitworth company that built her, either as an executive launch or a company ferry for shipyard workers. In 1939 she was transferred to Newcastle City Council and was likely used as a ferry on the River Tyne during the Second World War. In 1946 she was moved to London and then commenced passenger services on the River Thames from Westminster Pier, downriver to Greenwich and up to Hampton Court. A single screw powered by diesel engine replaced the original steam powered twin screw arrangement. Her operators on the Thames were H G Hastings (1947–45), Thames Launches (1955–59) and, renamed Tower Belle, W R Witham (1960–76).

In 1976 she was abandoned, no longer considered river-worthy, at Eel Pie Island in Twickenham. There she was found by the owner of the Bristol Packet Boat Trips company, which operated narrowboat harbour tours in Bristol City Docks. Tower Belle was brought by lorry to Bristol, sustaining further damage en route. After repairs she was re-launched into the docks in late 1976. Trips down the Avon Gorge, to Avonmouth and back were offered, in addition to journeys upriver to the Chequers Inn at Hanham and Beese's Tea Gardens. Private parties, sometimes with an on-board jazz band were also offered. In subsequent years, improvements to the vessel included the replacement of the wooden flooring with a more durable steel deck, and the addition of an electrical generator, enabling power for DJ parties and refrigeration for refreshments.

In 2010, the 90th birthday of Tower Belle was celebrated with a special commemorative cruise which included the attendance of Lord Mayor Colin Smith, who cut a cake and said, "It is remarkable that this boat can still be around after 90 years and, with the renaissance in the city docks, that boats such as this have come back into huge popularity and add to the city's culture."

== Technical information ==
Tower Belle is powered by a diesel engine which drives a single propeller. Her overall length is 67.97 ft (20.72 m) and her beam is 13 ft (4.0 m). The draught is 2.83 ft (0.86 m) and the air draught is 12 ft (3.7 m). The ship is licensed to carry 95 passengers and is equipped with life rings, inflatable life rafts and life jackets. There is a small bar and toilet facilities.
