= Fellows Morton & Clayton =

Defunct British canal transport company

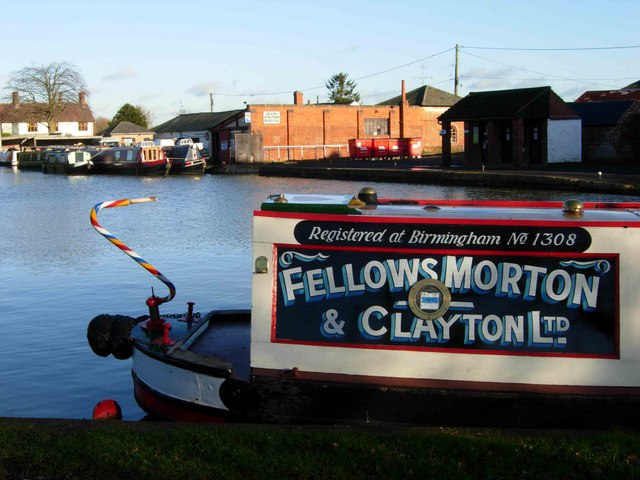
A Fellows Morton & Clayton boat at Gayton Junction, Northampton, repainted in the original company livery

Fellows Morton & Clayton Ltd was, for much of the early 20th century, the largest and best-known canal transportation company in England. The company was in existence from 1889 to 1947.

== Origins ==
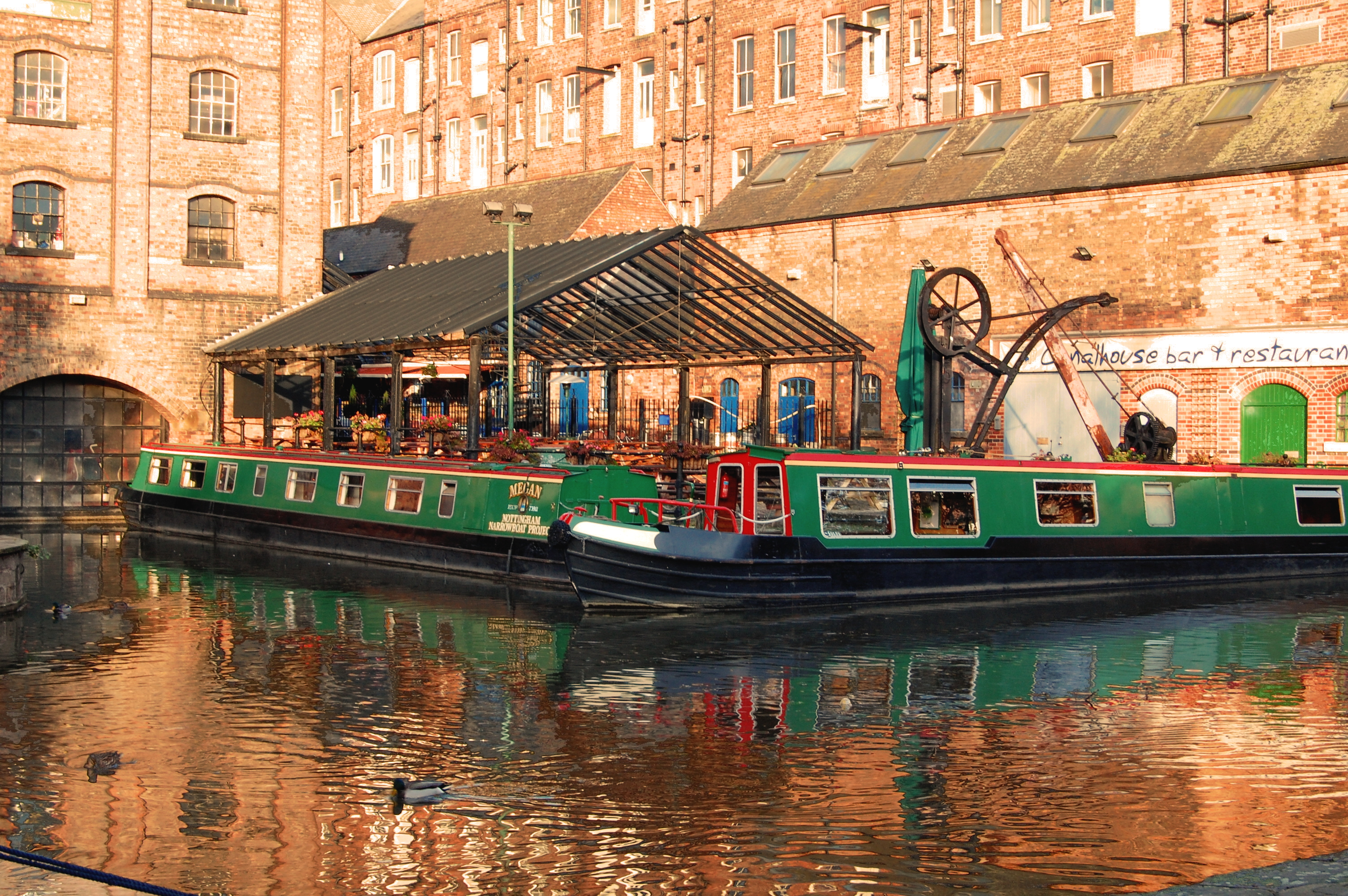
Boats moored outside the Fellows Morton & Clayton basin in Nottingham

The company started in 1837 when James Fellows, an agent for a canal carrier, decided to start his own company. James was 32 and based in West Bromwich. His first boat was called "Providence". In January 1839 he was allowed toll credit on the Warwick and Napton Canal as his boats were working down to London so frequently. He expanded rapidly and moved his operation to Toll End in Tipton in 1841. His business was as a "Railway & Canal Carrier" even though his rail activities were minor. James died in 1854 aged 49, and his widow Eliza carried on the business until their son Joshua was old enough to be an official partner. By 1855 he was transporting 13,000 tons of iron castings between London and Birmingham each year.

In the late 1850s a new boat-building facility was built at Tipton and by the early 1860s the fleet had grown to some 50 boats. Long-distance carrying was the mainstay of the business during these early years.

In 1876 Frederick Morton brought with him investment capital to expand the business, and the company name was changed to Fellows Morton & Co. This new company continued to absorb smaller traders, so expanding with new boats and also with acquired vessels.

=== Formation of the company ===
In 1888–1889 William Clayton of Saltley, who operated a special fleet of liquid cargo boats as well as traditional loads, became the third partner. William died before the companies merged formally but his son, Thomas, took his place. Fellows, Morton & Clayton Ltd. was formed on 3 July 1889.

The three managing directors appointed at the first meeting of the new company were Joshua Fellows, Frederick Morton and Thomas Clayton, on salaries of £600 (equivalent to £70,000 in 2025), each. The new chairman of Fellows, Morton & Clayton Ltd. was Alderman Reuben Farley the majority of shareholders being family members of the directors of the company.

At the time of formation the general cargo fleet amounted to some 11 steamers and around 112 butty boats. The tank boats were transferred to another new company which was called Thomas Clayton Limited of Oldbury.

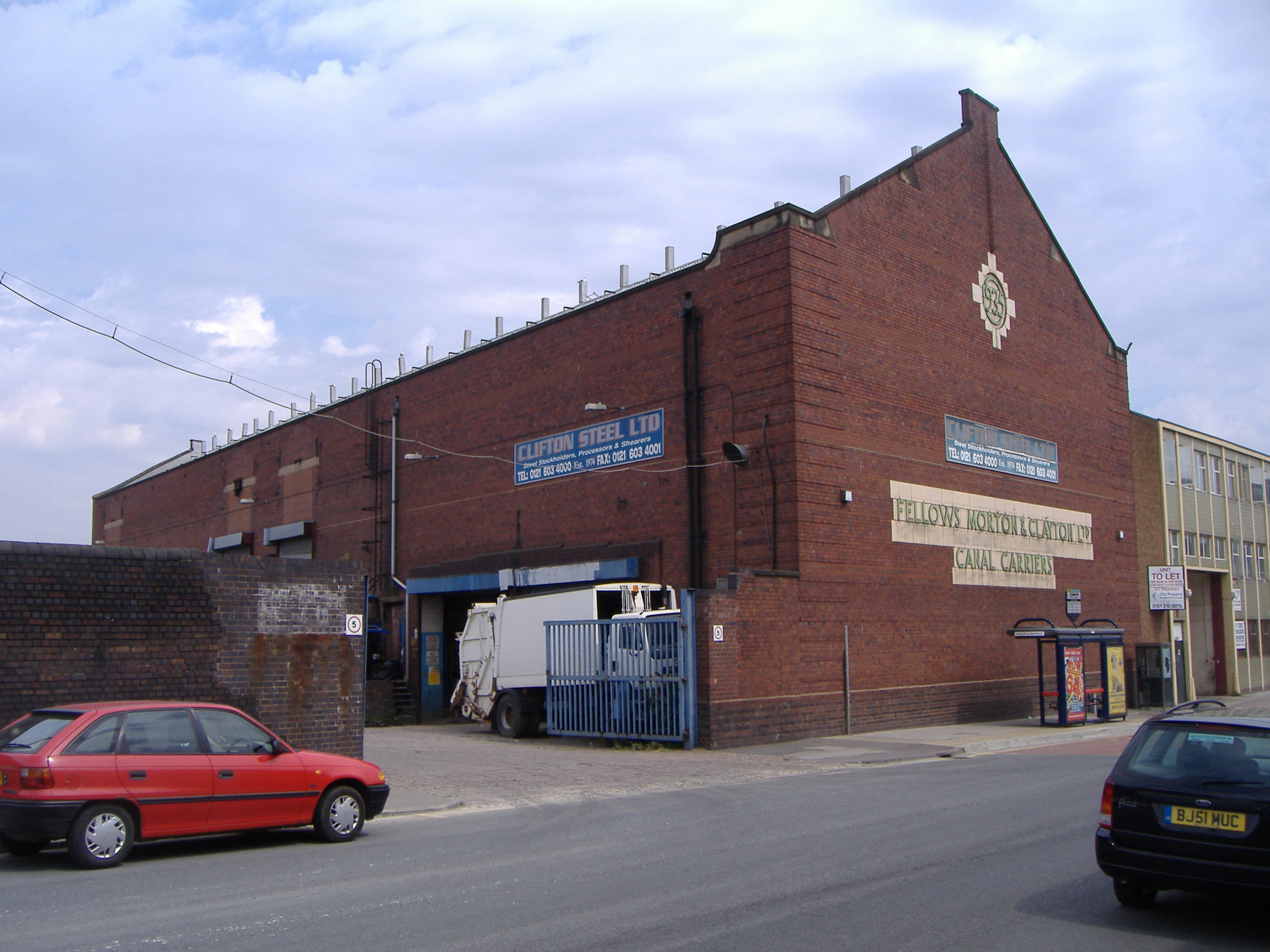
The headquarters and basin at Fazeley Street, Birmingham

The company's first results for the 18 months ending 30 June 1890 showed a net profit of £7,497 (equivalent to £830,000 in 2025). Trading had not been easy to start with – a dock strike in London had caused a serious financial loss and an epidemic of Russian influenza amongst the horses had caused many deaths. However, as there was new traffic, a new basin and headquarters were completed at Fazeley Street in Birmingham. The headquarters were designed by the builder Edwin Shipway. The company had also acquired the interests of a rival carrier, Fanshaw and Pinson. The capital then stood at £84,620 (equivalent to £9,400,000 in 2025); barges, boats and steamers were valued at £20,852 (equivalent to £2,320,000 in 2025), and horses at £4,000 (equivalent to £440,000 in 2025).

=== Last known working boats in existence ===
Currently there are only 29 of these boats still in existence, 6 of which are still in use to this day. The last remaining boats of this type are in the National Waterways Museum. There are 12 recorded sinkages, and there are two currently in restoration. The conditions of the rest are currently unknown.

== Steam-powered boats ==
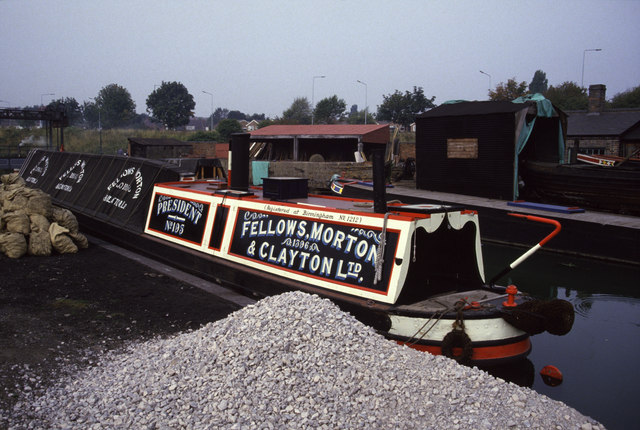
1909-built FMC steam narrowboat President, preserved in working order, based at the Black Country Living Museum

In the new boatyard at Fazeley Street they built five steel-plate steam-powered boats. After an initial period of use they were found unsatisfactory because of the excessive wear on the hull's steel.

In 1896 Fellows Morton & Clayton tried iron in the construction of their boats. The boat had an elm bottom and iron sides. This proved much more effective and 3 of the 5 original steel steamers were rebuilt.

Between 1898 and 1899, 8 more iron composite steamers were produced from the Saltley dock and 9 more between 1905 and 1911.

The steamers were known as fly-boats or express-boats and kept mainly on main-line long-distance routes. On the timetable, a trip from London (City Road Basin) to Birmingham (Fazeley Street Depot) would take around 54 hours. It was a non-stop service and the crew of four would change shifts along the route. The main drawback was the lack of carrying space on the boat due to the size of the engine and boiler. The boats picked up coke at preset points along their routes.

President survives and is owned and operated by and from the Black Country Living Museum.

=== List of steamers built by Fellows Morton & Clayton ===
Name	Construction type	Construction location	Construction date	Registration	Registration date	Engine	Boiler	Fate
Hecla	Wooden	Toll End, Tipton	1886	Birmingham 803	27 Mar 1892	W. H. and A. H. Haines Ltd. Birmingham	Cochranes, Birkenhead	Dismantled November 1921
Queen	Wooden	Toll End, Tipton	1887	Wolverhampton 591		W. H. and A. H. Haines Ltd. Birmingham	Cochranes, Birkenhead	Dismantled around 1910
Duchess	Wooden	Toll End, Tipton	1887	Birmingham 841	16 Feb 1893	Unknown	Unknown	Sold May 1893
Victoria	Wooden	Toll End, Tipton	1887	Birmingham 884	27 Oct 1893	Nettlefolds, Birmingham	J. Watt and Co, Birmingham	Dismantled July 1919
Phoenix	Wooden	Saltley by FMC	Dec 1893	Birmingham 886	1 Dec 1893	FMC	Danks, Oldbury	Dismantled Sep 1925
Speedwell	Wooden	Saltley by FMC	Mar 1894	Birmingham 892	20 Apr 1894	Nettlefolds, Birmingham	Cockranes, Birkenhead	Dismantled Sep 1925
Pirate	Wooden	Saltley by FMC	Jun 1894	Birmingham 900	16 Jun 1894	Nettlefolds, Birmingham	Fletchers, Derby	Sold Dec 1902
Duke	Wooden	Saltley by FMC	Mar 1895	Birmingham 930	29 Mar 1895	FMC	Cockranes, Birkenhead	Dismantled Jun 1923
Earl	Wooden	Saltley by FMC	Jun 1895	Birmingham 939	28 Jun 1895	FMC	Cockranes, Birkenhead	Sold Nov 1925
Princess	Iron Composite	Saltley by FMC	Jun 1896	Birmingham 959	12 Oct 1896	FMC	Cockranes, Birkenhead	Converted to motor boat Pilot Dec 1924
Countess	Iron Composite	Saltley by FMC	Jun 1897	Birmingham 987	1 Oct 1897	FMC	Burrells, Thetford	Converted to motor boat Captain July 1924
Marquis	Iron Composite	Saltley by FMC	Mar 1898	Birmingham 1002	18 Mar 1898	FMC	Fletchers, Derby	Converted to motor boat Jan 1925
Emperor	Iron Composite	Saltley by FMC	May 1898	Birmingham 1006	3 Jun 1898	FMC	Cochranes, Birkenhead	Converted to motor boat Apr 1917
Empress	Iron Composite	Saltley by FMC	May 1898	Birmingham 1009	16 Jul 1898	FMC	Cochranes, Birkenhead	Converted to motor boat Envoy Oct 1919
Prince	Iron Composite	Saltley by FMC	Oct 1898	Birmingham 1011	5 Oct 1898	FMC	Fletchers, Derby	Converted to motor boat Mar 1926
Baron	Iron Composite	Saltley by FMC	Nov 1898	Birmingham 1015	23 Dec 1898	Nettlefolds, Derby	Fletchers, Derby	Converted to motor boat Feb 1915
Baroness	Iron Composite	Saltley by FMC	Nov 1898	Birmingham 1020	24 Feb 1899	Nettlefolds, Derby	Fletchers, Derby	Converted to motor boat Briton May 1915
Sultan	Iron Composite	Saltley by FMC	Jun 1899	Birmingham 1034	7 Jul 1899	FMC	Danks, Oldbury	Converted to motor boat May 1924
Count	Iron Composite	Saltley by FMC	Jun 1899	Birmingham 1036	4 Aug 1899	FMC	Danks, Oldbury	Converted to motor boat Jul 1925
Colonel	Iron Composite	Saltley by FMC	Jun 1899	Birmingham 1040	27 Oct 1899	FMC	Danks, Oldbury	Converted to motor boat Sep 1924
The King	Iron Composite	Saltley by FMC	Feb 1905	Birmingham 1152	5 May 1905	FMC	John Thompson & Co. Ltd. Wolverhampton	Converted to motor boat Jun 1925
Admiral	Iron Composite	Saltley by FMC	Sep 1905	Birmingham 1157	29 Sep 1905	FMC	John Thompson & Co. Ltd. Wolverhampton	Converted to motor boat Jun 1924
General	Iron Composite	Saltley by FMC	Nov 1907	Birmingham 1192	29 Nov 1907	FMC	John Thompson & Co. Ltd. Wolverhampton	Converted to motor boat May 1925
Monarch	Iron Composite	Saltley by FMC	Apr 1908	Birmingham 1201	22 May 1908	FMC	John Thompson & Co. Ltd. Wolverhampton	Converted to motor boat Jan 1925
President	Iron Composite	Saltley by FMC	Jun 1909	Birmingham 1212	23 Jun 1909	FMC	Ruston Proctor & Co. Ltd. Lincoln	Converted to motor boat May 1925
Viceroy	Iron Composite	Saltley by FMC	Dec 1909	Birmingham 1214	3 Dec 1909	A. H. Beasley and Sons, Uxbridge	Ruston Proctor & Co. Ltd. Lincoln	Converted to motor boat Dec 1925
Vulcan	Iron Composite	Saltley by FMC	Nov 1910	Birmingham 1226	25 Nov 1910	A. H. Beasley and Sons, Uxbridge	Ruston Proctor & Co. Ltd. Lincoln	Ex Gas Boat. Converted to motor boat Sep 1927
Vanguard	Iron Composite	Saltley by FMC	Jul 1911	Birmingham 1243	29 Sep 1911	A. H. Beasley and Sons, Uxbridge	Ruston Proctor & Co. Ltd. Lincoln	Converted to motor boat Nov 1926
Swan	Wooden	Uxbridge by FMC	Jul 1911	Uxbridge 457		T. A. Savery & Co. Ltd, Birmingham	T. A. Savery & Co. Ltd., Birmingham	Dismantled
Victory	Iron Composite	Saltley by FMC	Oct 1911	Birmingham 1247	15 Dec 1911	A. H. Beasley and Sons, Uxbridge	Ruston Proctor & Co. Ltd. Lincoln	Converted to motor boat Aug 1927
Hecla (II)	Wooden	Uxbridge by FMC	May 1922	Birmingham 1436	19 May 1922			Converted to motor boat Jul 1924
Duteous	Wooden	Uxbridge by FMC	Mar 1923	Birmingham 1448	2 Mar 1923			Converted to motor boat Aug 1924

== Motor boats ==
In 1906 an experiment was carried out on the steamer Vulcan: a gas suction engine was fitted, which reduced the size of crew needed to run the boat and also reduced the fuel consumption, but the size of the installation was still an issue. In 1911 a rival carrier had tried a semi-diesel engine which had proved to be successful. Fellows Morton & Clayton built a boat for testing this engine (a Swedish Bolinder single-cylinder direct-reversing engine from J. & C. G. Bolinder of Stockholm) which was built with a similar hull to the steamers but with a shortened engine room. Linda became the first motor boat of the fleet. The new engine was a success and they immediately started building another nine. Due to the success of the new engine they converted all steamers to motor boats by 1927.

Fellows Morton & Clayton had built mainly their own boats, the Uxbridge dock building wooden boats and Saltley building new and maintaining existing boats. In 1922 they approached W. J. Yarwood & Sons of Northwich to make 12 motor boats. The first arrived in May 1923. They ordered 12 more from Yarwoods which were delivered hull-only starting in 1926.

== Depots ==
The headquarters of the company was at Fazeley Street in Birmingham. In addition to this, the company maintained depots at the following locations.

- London, Regent's Canal Dock
- Brentford
- Bulls Bridge
- Reading
- Slough
- Hertford
- Uxbridge
- Berkhamsted
- Aylesbury
- Oxford
- Blisworth
- Northampton
- Peterborough
- Long Buckby
- Braunston
- Stratford on Avon
- Warwick
- Coventry
- Worcester
- Stourport
- Dudley Port
- Wolverhampton
- Great Haywood
- Burton on Trent
- Derby
- Langley Mill
- Nottingham
- Newark on Trent
- Leicester
- Foxton
- Market Harborough

== Liveries ==
The first Fellows Morton & Clayton livery was a combination of black & white with a red dividing line. Shortly after the company re-incorporated in 1921 the livery changed to red, green and yellow.

== Ending ==
In the first 6 months of 1948 Fellows Morton & Clayton incurred its first trading loss of £5,000 (equivalent to £157,000 in 2025), and in November 1948 the company went into voluntary liquidation. The assets were taken over by the British Transport Commission on 1 January 1949.

== See also ==
- W. H. Walker and Brothers
