= W. H. Walker and Brothers =

British boat builder

W. H. Walker and Brothers was a narrowboat builder based in Rickmansworth, England.The business was established in 1905 by Harry Walker. He leased part of Frogmoor Wharf, the Grand Union Canal, from Robert Grosvenor, 2nd Baron Ebury. The firm thrived for most of the twentieth century, from 1905 to 1964. They were one of the major producers of narrow boats for the English canal network. The site was sold for redevelopment to Tesco in June 1989.

Harry Walker started with repair work to boats but in 1907 he started building his own boats. Walkers specialised in wooden construction. It took eight oak trees and one elm tree per boat. The first were horsedrawn, but motor power was introduced from 1913. Boats were built for Fellows Morton & Clayton, the Grand Union Canal Carrying Company, Cadbury of Bournville and Wander of Kings Langley, the manufacturers of Ovaltine. No more new boats were built after World War II. Repair work kept the boatyard in business until 1964. The total production of their business was 212 new boats. They also repaired more than 600 boats.

== Bibliography ==
- Walker, Anthony John (1991). Walkers' of Ricky: a history of W. H. Walker & Brothers Limited of Rickmansworth, Hertfordshire. Rickmansworth: W. H. Walker & Brothers. ISBN 0-9517923-0-X.
