= Grand Union Canal Carrying Company =

English freight carrier

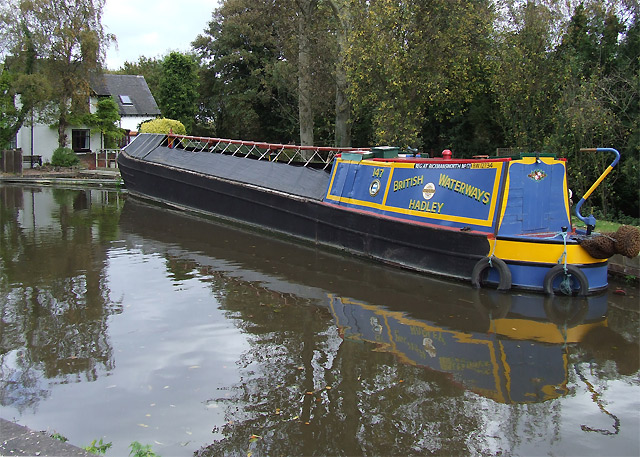
The boat was originally built by Harland & Wolff in May 1937 for the Grand Union Canal Carrying Company, but is seen here at Tatenhill Lock, Staffordshire, in British Waterways colours following its most recent restoration.

The Grand Union Canal Carrying Company was a freight carrying transport service in England from 1934 to 1948.

== Background ==
For more detail on this section see the History of the Grand Union Canal.

In 1929 the Regents Canal Company bought the Grand Junction Canal Company and a new company, the Grand Union Canal Company, was established. Later that year the new company bought the Warwick and Napton Canal and the Warwick and Birmingham Canal.

In 1932 the Grand Union Canal Company bought the Leicester Navigation, the Loughborough Navigation and the Erewash Canal for £75,423 (£4.55 million in 2025).

For the first time the main line from London to Birmingham and the River Trent were all owned by one company with the exception of the Oxford Canal between Braunston and Napton. The Grand Union Canal Company attempted to buy the Oxford Canal but the agreement failed.

The Grand Union Canal was now over 300 miles long. A main objective was to create a route capable of taking 14 ft barges or two narrow boats from London to Birmingham.

== Formation of the company ==
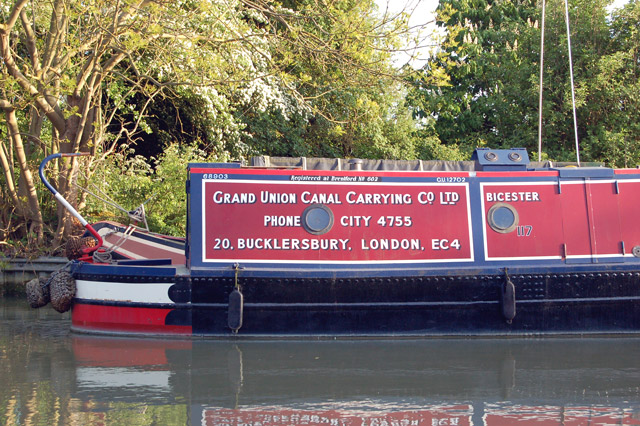
A reproduction of the livery carried by GUCCC boats from 1937 until the outbreak of World War II. This is Bicester, built by Harland & Wolff. Until the 1980s it was regularly used to carry cargo including wheat, lime juice and retail coal. The boat is now converted as a cruiser with a full-length cabin.

The new Grand Union Canal Company bought Associated Canal Carriers Ltd. and started the Grand Union Canal Carrying Company Ltd. in 1934. The boats were marked with GUCCC as an abbreviation for the company name.

The company secured new traffic in the 1930s and ordered new boats from W. J. Yarwood & Sons of Northwich, Harland & Wolff at North Woolwich and W. H. Walker and Brothers of Rickmansworth. Eventually the company acquired around 186 pairs of boats of a new improved design. The boats acquired the nicknames Woolwichs, Northwichs and Rickys.

== Decline and closure ==
With the outbreak of World War II men again left the canal. In 1942 the Ministry of War Transport took control. For the duration of the war the company made a loss. The assets were taken over by the British Transport Commission on 1 January 1949.
