= W. J. Yarwood & Sons =

Coordinates: 53.25551°N 2.51525°W

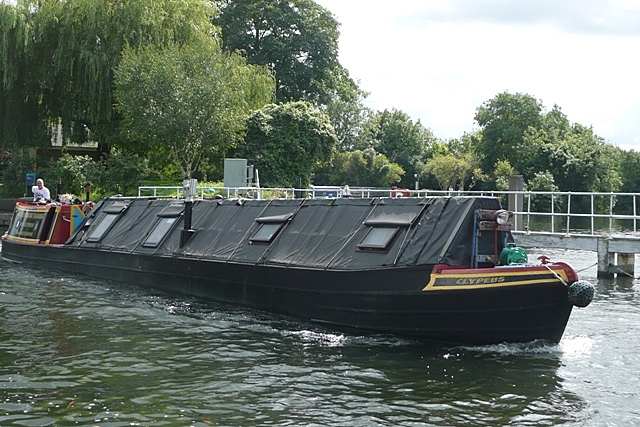
A converted working narrowboat, Clypeus, opens up leaving Penton Hook Lock heading upstream past the weir. Clypeus is number 28 in the Grand Union Canal Carrying Company fleet, being one of 12 iron composite pairs of Star Class boats built by Yarwoods of Northwich in 1935.

W. J. Yarwood & Sons Ltd were a shipbuilding company based in Northwich, Cheshire from 1896 to 1966.

== History ==
The company founder, William James Yarwood (1851–1926) served an apprenticeship at an ironfoundry in Northwich. He was appointed as a blacksmith with the River Weaver Navigation. In 1896 he assumed control and renamed the John Thompson shipbuilding business, based on the west bank of the River Weaver near Northwich.

Within 3 years, 15 vessels had been delivered to the Manchester Ship Canal Co., Douglas Corporation (Isle of Man) and Brunner Mond.. Later contracts included the Admiralty, the Air Ministry, the Mersey Docks & Harbour Board, the Port of London, the Grand Union Canal Carrying Company and Fellows Morton & Clayton.

On the death of William James Yarwood, he was succeeded by his four sons. Yarwood's business had expanded to such an extent that it produced almost every ship component, from steam engines to propellers and anchors. During World War II, the yard built over 100 vessels for the Admiralty and the Air Ministry. As an employee of the Air Ministry, T. E. Lawrence worked there in 1934 (shortly before his death) to oversee the fitting out of H.M.S. Auxiliary "Aquarius".

There were substantial contracts between 1903 and 1948 for coastal vessels built for Brunner Mond (later Imperial Chemical Industries).

In 1947 the yard was sold to Athel Line Ltd, a subsidiary of United Molasses, and between 1955 and 1965 built 32 steam and diesel-powered tugs. In 1965 the last vessel built at Yarwood's was a 168-ton diesel tug, the St Elmo. When the yard closed the total output from Yarwood’s had been over 1,000 vessels.

Whilst many of the vessels remain in use today, much of the yard has been consumed by the expansion of Northwich. The side slip dock remains and is in use for visiting and permanently moored craft.
