= Ruston, Proctor and Company =

British equipment manufacturing company

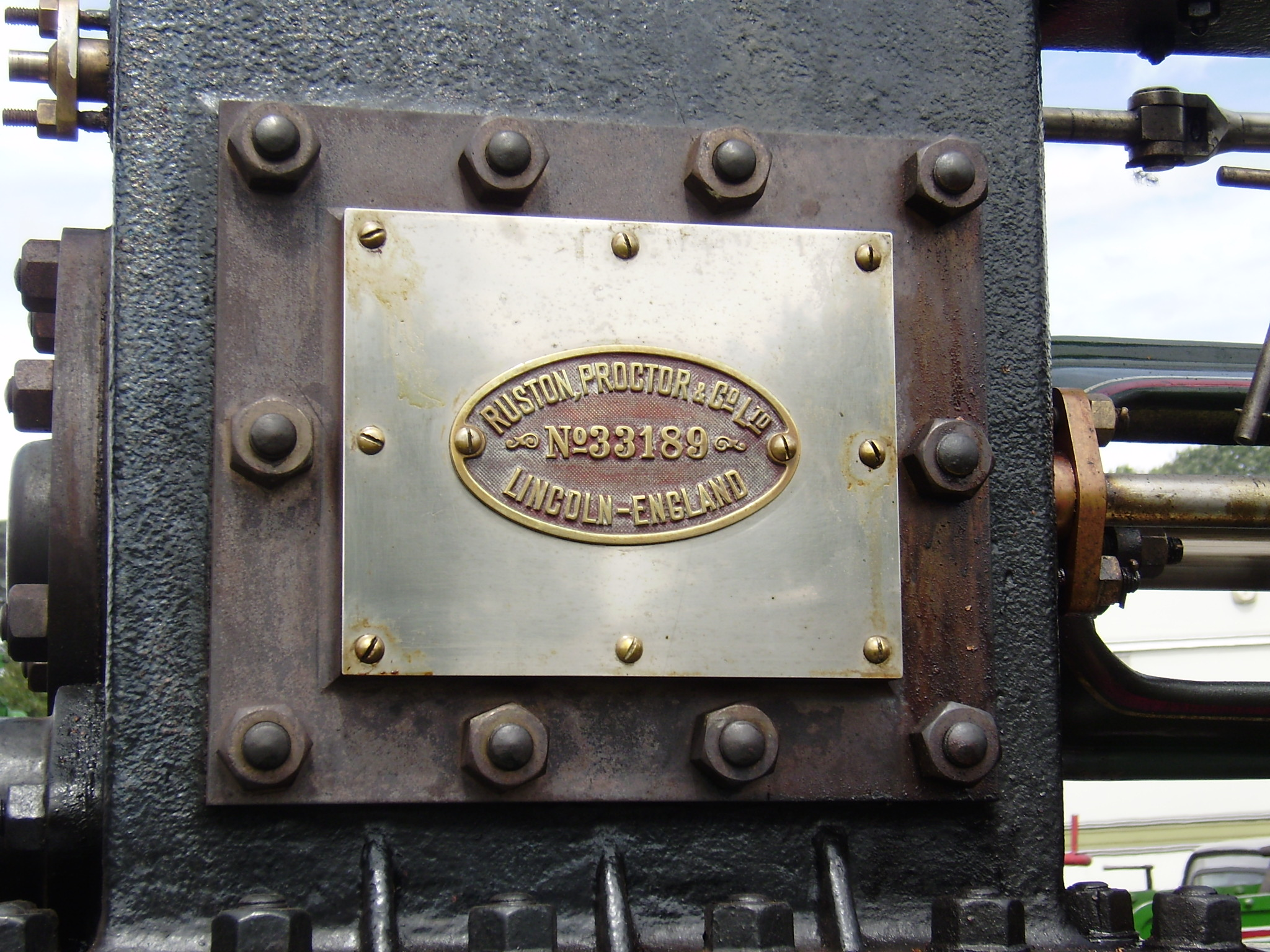
Works plate on a Ruston, Proctor and Co. traction engine

Ruston, Proctor and Company was established in Lincoln, England in 1857, and were manufacturers of steam tractors and engines. They later became Rustons and then Ruston & Hornsby.

== History ==
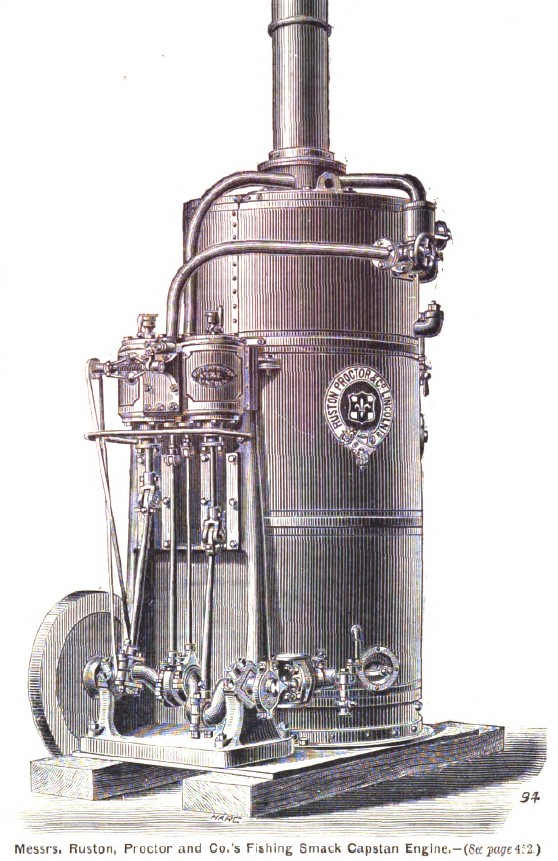
Ruston Proctor steam winch engine

The firm was started as millwrights and implement manufacturers 'Burton & Proctor' by James Toyne Proctor and Theophilus Burton in Lincoln in 1840. Joseph Ruston became a partner in the company in 1857 by buying Burton's share and the company changed name to Ruston, Proctor & Co. and grew to become a major agricultural engineering firm.

In 1865 Ruston became the sole proprietor. In 1877 the company produced its first traction Engine. In 1899 the firm became a limited company with a workforce of over 1000. In the same year the company produced its first steamroller. Noting that its workmanship “leaves nothing to be desired,” The Engineer wrote in 1889 that the company had “perhaps done more in locomotive work than any other firm in what is known as the agricultural engineering trade.” Ruston exported thousands of portable steam engines to Ukraine in Russia for grain Threshing. Exports were also made to Argentina, Chile and Australia. In 1918 it merged with the established Richard Hornsby & Sons company from Grantham, Lincolnshire to become Ruston and Hornsby. That company later merged with Bucyrus-Erie and Ruston-Bucyrus was established in 1930.

Rustons were primarily steam engineers, manufacturing portable, stationary and traction engines, boilers, and associated engineering products such as winding gear, shafts and pulleys. Threshing machines, clover hullers, corn mills, maize shellers and pumps for steam power were also made. Steam powered winches for sailing trawlers were another product, including boiler, engine, drive shafts and winch bollard. As well as engines for agriculture machines Rustons made railway locomotives, industrial equipment and mining machinery. The company also expanded into electrical and diesel engineering.

The firm were one of the first to manufacture steam-powered excavating machinery – in the 1880s producing the "Dunbar & Ruston's" steam navvy (excavator). These 2 cu yd machines were used in the construction of the Manchester Ship Canal. In 1906 they built the "Ruston Light Steam Shovel", and exhibited it at the Royal Agricultural Show of 1907 held in Lincoln, the machine being of 3/4 cu yd capacity.

== Preserved machines ==
- Ruston Proctor No.10227 (1884) steam engine, preserved at Museum Žeravica, Novo Miloševo, Serbia www.muzejzeravica.org
- Ruston Proctor reg. no. CT3949 traction engine no. 33189.
- Ruston Proctor works no. 51168 (1916) paraffin mechanical locomotive at the Vale of Rheidol Railway.
- Ruston Proctor works no. 52124 (1918) paraffin mechanical locomotive with Museum of Lincolnshire Life.
- Ruston Proctor flywheel drive to overhead belts: Sapucai Steam Train Maintenance Depot, Paraguay.
- Ruston Proctor no. 18188: preserved at Thinktank, Birmingham
- Ruston Proctor no. 27360: preserved by Freunde historischer Fahrzeuge Immensen at Lehrte, Germany
- Ruston Proctor flywheel drive No.15033 / 811XL: established as play equipment in the recreation park, Jugiong, New South Wales, Australia
- Ruston Proctor no. 29677: preserved at Centro Interativo da Ruralidade - Arronches, Portugal
Preserved Machines
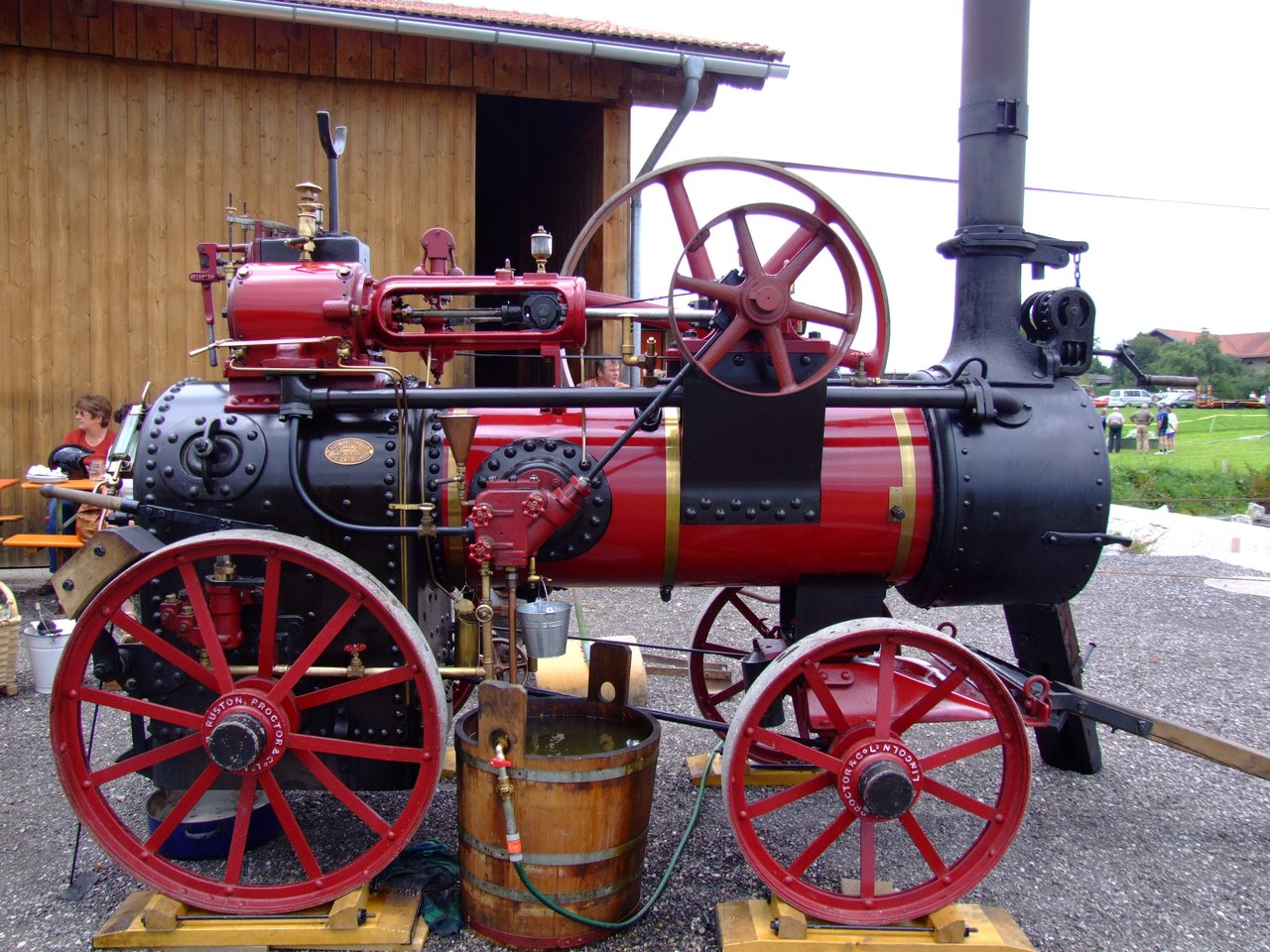
A portable engine by Ruston, Proctor & Co.

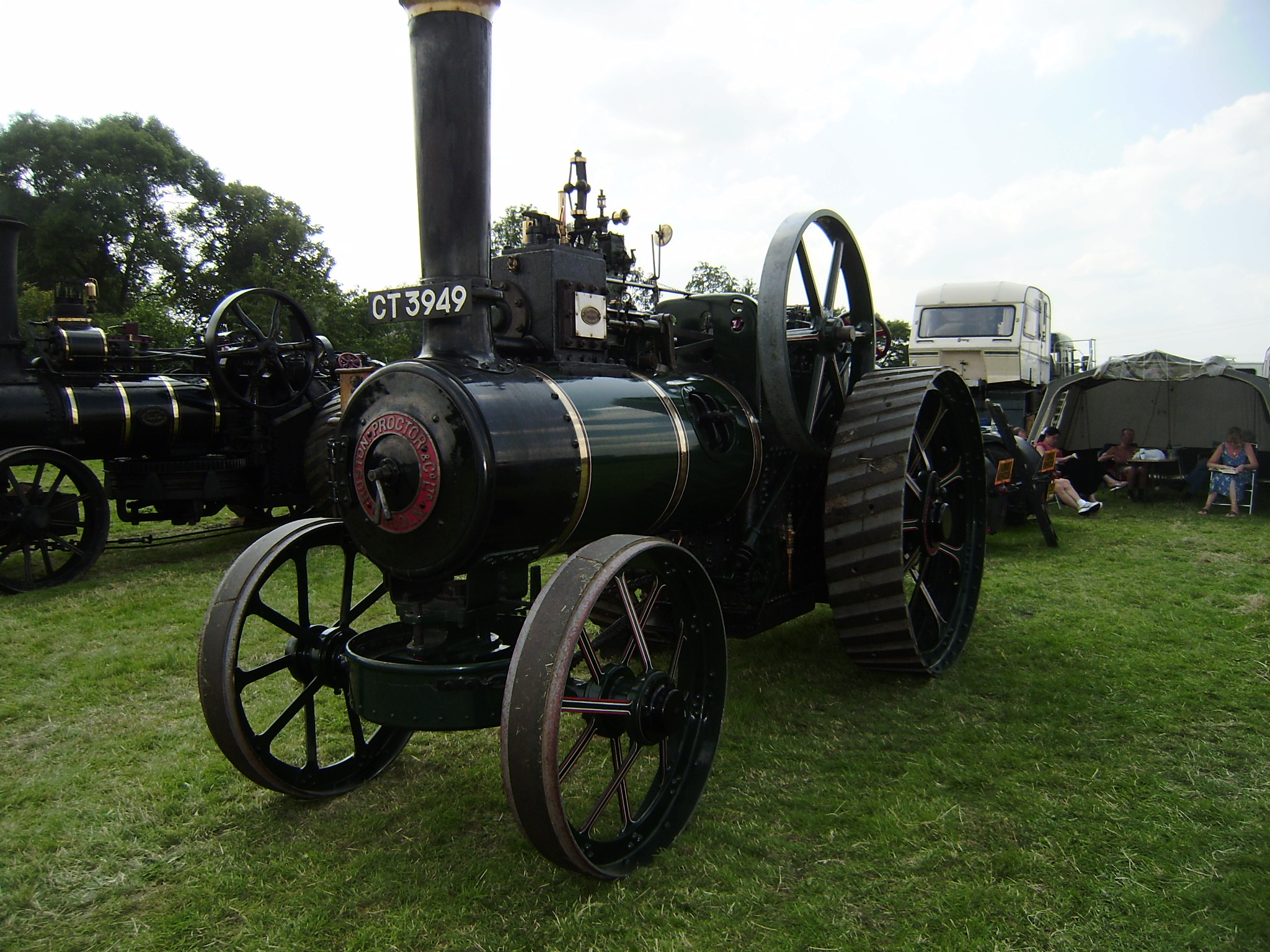
Ruston, Proctor and Co. engine at Cromford steam fair 2008

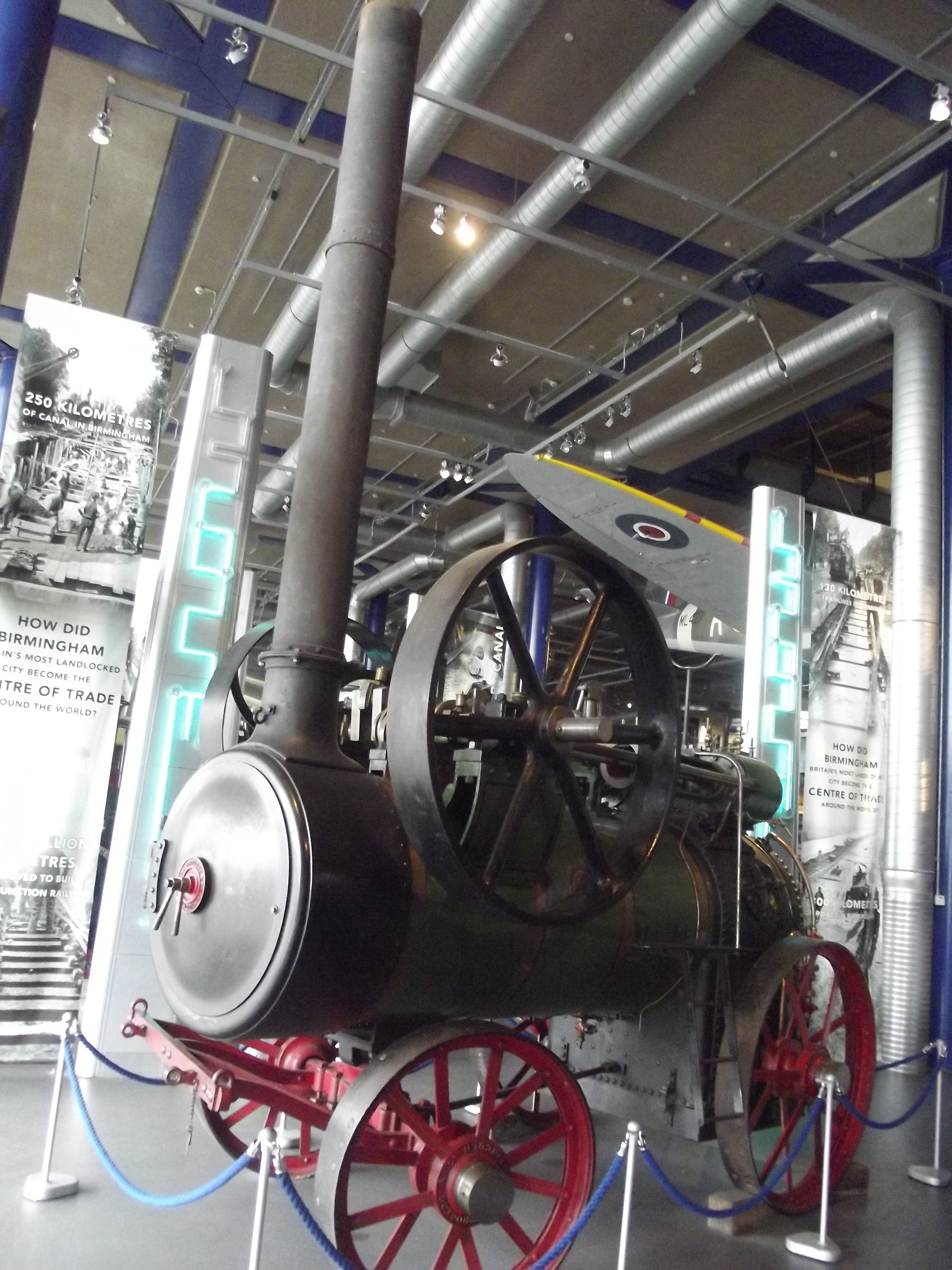
No. 18188 seen at Thinktank, Birmingham

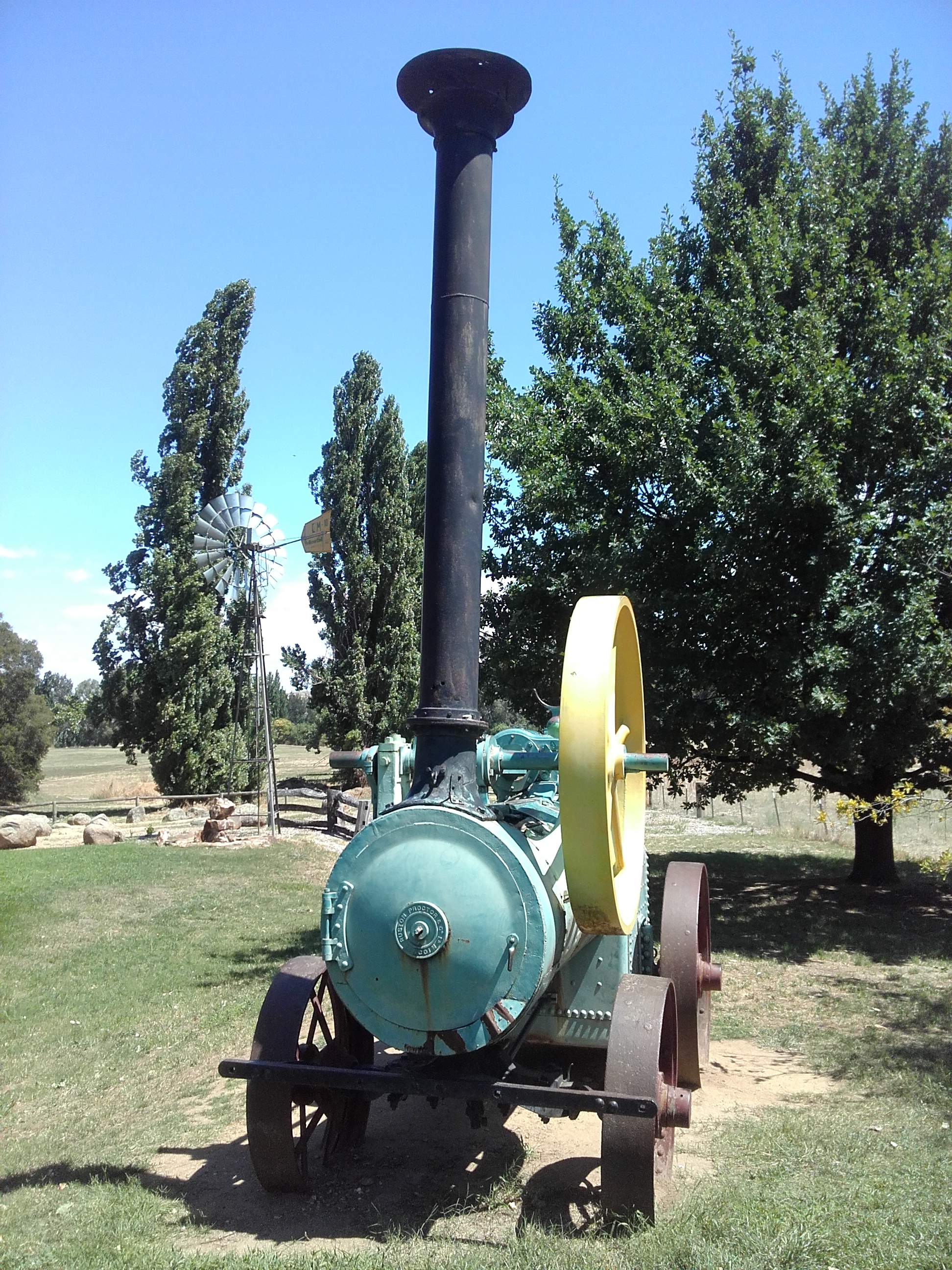
Ruston Proctor flywheel drive No.15033 / 811XL: recreation park, Jugiong, New South Wales, Australia

1906, 2 HP Ruston, Proctor & Co. Steam Engine showed working in Autoclasica 2013, in Buenos Aires, Argentina

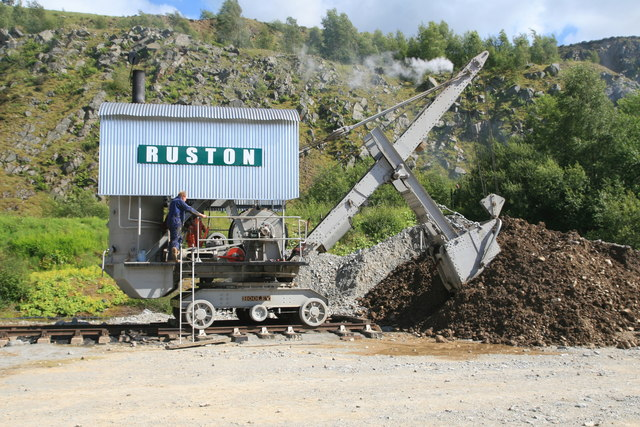
1909 Ruston Proctor Steam Navvy was at Museum of Lincolnshire Life, now restored at Threlkeld Museum

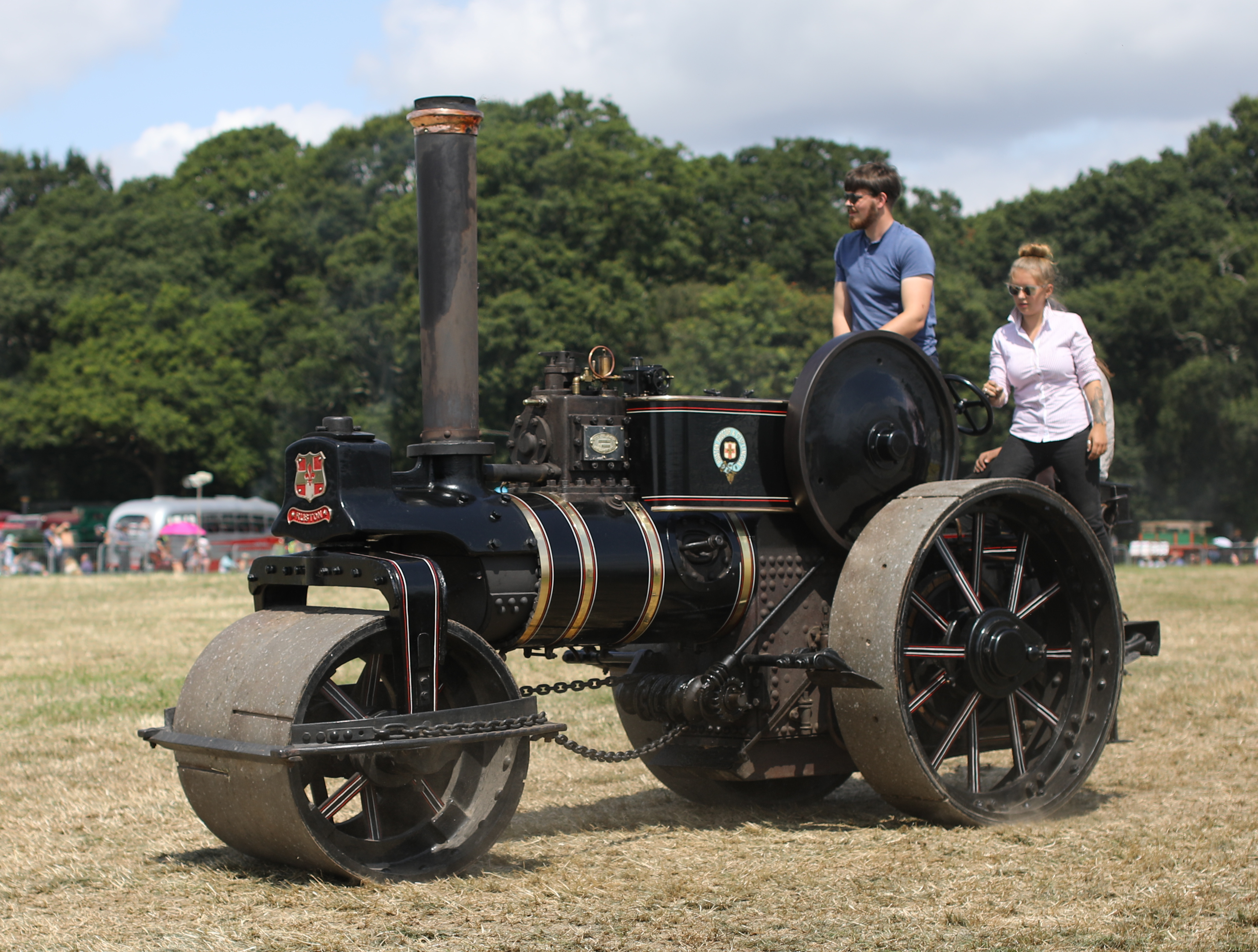
Ruston Proctor Steam Roller No 38591 named 'Midnight' at Netley Marsh Show

== See also ==
- Ruston & Hornsby
- Ruston (engine builder)
