= La Cornue =

La Cornue is a French oven and cooking range manufacturer, founded in 1908 by Albert Dupuy, a Parisian herbalist and perfumer. The company currently produces three types of ovens: Château, CornuFé, and CornuChef.

== History ==
Dupuy founded La Cornue in order to create ovens that used a new type of natural gas being used in Paris. By taking advantage of the circulation of hot air within the oven, he was able to create a much more effective oven than the others at the time. This first oven was called Rôtisseuse-Pâtissiere La Cornue (La Cornue Roast and Pastry cook).

In the 1950s, Albert Dupuy was succeeded by André Dupuy and the company was modernised. The 5 Etoiles (5 Star) range was also introduced at this time. The company was further modernised following the takeover of Xavier Dupuy in 1985, despite remaining a small business of around 60 staff.

In 2015 Middleby Corporation acquired Aga Rangemaster Group which included La Cornue.
