= Enodis =

British multinational foodmaking equipment manufacturing company

Enodis plc
- Type: Public limited company
- Industry: Foodmaking equipment
- Founded: 1851
- Defunct: 2008
- Fate: Acquired by The Manitowoc Company
- Headquarters: London, United Kingdom
- Key people: Peter Brooks (Chairman); David McCulloch (CEO)
- Revenue: £1.22 billion (2008)
- Operating income: £72.0 million (2007)
- Net income: £41.1 million (2007)

Enodis plc was a British multinational foodmaking equipment manufacturing company headquartered in London. A former FTSE 250 Index constituent, it was acquired by the American machinery manufacturer The Manitowoc Company in October 2008, with its activities subsequently being fully integrated into those of Manitowoc.

== History ==
Enodis was founded by Samuel and William Berisford in 1851 as a small grocery and pharmacy in Manchester under the name S&W Berisford. William Berisford, a grandson of the founder, started trading in sugar at the end of the 19th century. The business incorporated in 1910. In 1968 it acquired commodity trading company J&H Rayner (Mincing Lane) Limited and through the 1970s it expanded its commodity business. In 1982 the company acquired British Sugar, owner of the Silver Spoon brand, and diversified into property and financial services.

Financial difficulties in the late-1980s and early-1990s led to a program of disposals including of British Sugar, but a new acquisition drive occurred in the 1990s, with the purchase of Magnet, a kitchen and joinery business, in 1994, the Welbilt Corporation, a United States food equipment business, in 1995 and the Scotsman Group, another US food equipment business, in 1999. In 2000 the company changed its name to Enodis. Between 2000 and 2002 Enodis sold its building and consumer products division, including Magnet, and also several other subsidiaries to become a focused food equipment production company.

The company became an acquisition target in 2006, turning away offers from Aga Foodservice and The Middleby Corporation and terminating more advanced discussions with The Manitowoc Company. Manitowoc returned with a fresh offer in April 2008, valuing Enodis at around £1 billion. The bid was accepted by the board and shareholders, with the deal closing that October with the delisting of Enodis shares from the London Stock Exchange.

Following an ongoing dispute with Felsted residents Sir Alan Haselhurst raised questions in the House of Commons in 2011 pertaining to Enodis's non delivery of advertised facilities.

== Operations ==
Enodis had manufacturing sites in the United Kingdom, United States, several countries in Continental Europe and in Asia. It sold exclusively to the corporate sector and its brands included:

- Cleveland (steamer cookers);
- Convotherm (steamers);
- Dean (fryers and filtration systems);
- Delfield (refrigerated units);
- Frymaster (fryers, filtration systems, holding cabinets);
- Garland (grills and ranges);
- Guyon (kitchen and self-serve surfaces);
- Ice-O-matic (refrigeration);
- Jackson (ware washers);
- Kysor Panel Systems (walk-in coolers, walk-in freezers, floral coolers, plant growth chambers, cleanrooms, dry rooms, document storage chambers, refrigerated warehouses, insulated panels, permanent shelters, residential construction);
- Kysor Warren (refrigerated cases, displays and systems)
- Lincoln (ovens and small wares);
- Merco Savory (heated displays);
- Merrychef (accelerated cooking);
- New Ton (ice makers);
- Scotsman Beverage Systems (beverage dispensers);
- Simag (ice machines);
- Varimixer (industrial mixers); and
- Viscount (catering and refrigeration).
