= Lincat =

British commercial catering company

Lincat Group plc
- Company type: Public (LSE)
- Industry: Commercial catering
- Founded: 23 July 1971
- Headquarters: Whisby Road, North Hykeham, LN6 3QZ
- Area served: Worldwide
- Key people: Alan Schroeder; Chairman; Paul Bouscarle; Chief Executive
- Products: Professional catering equipment
- Revenue: £31.7m (2009)
- Operating income: £9.8m (2009)
- Net income: £8.4m (2009)
- Website: Lincat.co.uk

Lincat is an industrial catering and foodservice equipment company based in Lincolnshire that is represented on the Alternative Investment Market. The company claims to be the UK's leading manufacturer of commercial catering equipment.

== History ==
Lincat Ltd was founded in 1971 in North Hykeham, Lincolnshire. The company began manufacturing electrically heated large-scale cooking equipment. From 1988 Lincat introduced gas-heated cooking equipment. The company was floated on the Unlisted Securities Market in 1988, then on to the LSE in 1994 and to the Alternative Investment Market on 20 August 2007.

The company moved to its present-day 12,000 sq metre manufacturing facility in 1997. On the afternoon of Monday 1 June 1998, the factory was formally opened by the Duke of Edinburgh.

The site includes a gym for staff use

In 2011, Lincat became an Official Supplier of catering equipment for the WorldSkills Cooking Competition 2011 in London.

=== Acquisitions ===
It bought IMC in December 1994 and Britannia in November 2002. Heydal, a kitchen ventilation manufacturer, was bought in March 2007 for £0.4 million and merged with the Britannia brand. It sold Mercury Appliances to Aga Rangemaster for £0.4 million in August 2009.

== Structure ==
It is situated in North Hykeham, not far from the A46 bypass, on Whisby Road near the junction with Kingsley Road, near the Hotel Ibis and just south of the district (North Kesteven) boundary with Lincoln.

It is a member of the Catering Equipment Suppliers Association.

=== Divisions ===
Other divisions of the company are

- IMC - based on the Wrexham Industrial Estate
- Britannia Kitchen Ventilation - based on the Sydenham Industrial Estate in Leamington Spa

== Products ==
It makes the full range of cooking and food preparation equipment for professional use (heavy duty), on a corporate scale. It has the Silverlink brand. It has won Caterer and Hotelkeeper awards. Lincat Group has market capitalisation of around £32m. It claims to sell over 2000 finished products and spares weekly. There are more than 450 items in its product range.

Types of equipment it makes are:

- Bain-maries
- Bake off ovens
- Convection ovens
- Conveyor toasters
- Deep fryers
- Electric fly killers
- Food steamers
- Griddles
- Grilling equipment
- Pizza ovens
- Roasting oven
- Sandwich toasters
- Sinks
- Water boilers
- UV Pass Through Steriliser Box

=== Services ===
It trains commercial cooks how to use its products on-site.

== See also ==
- Aga Rangemaster Group
- Enodis
- IMI plc
