= AGA cooker =

Stove and cooker system

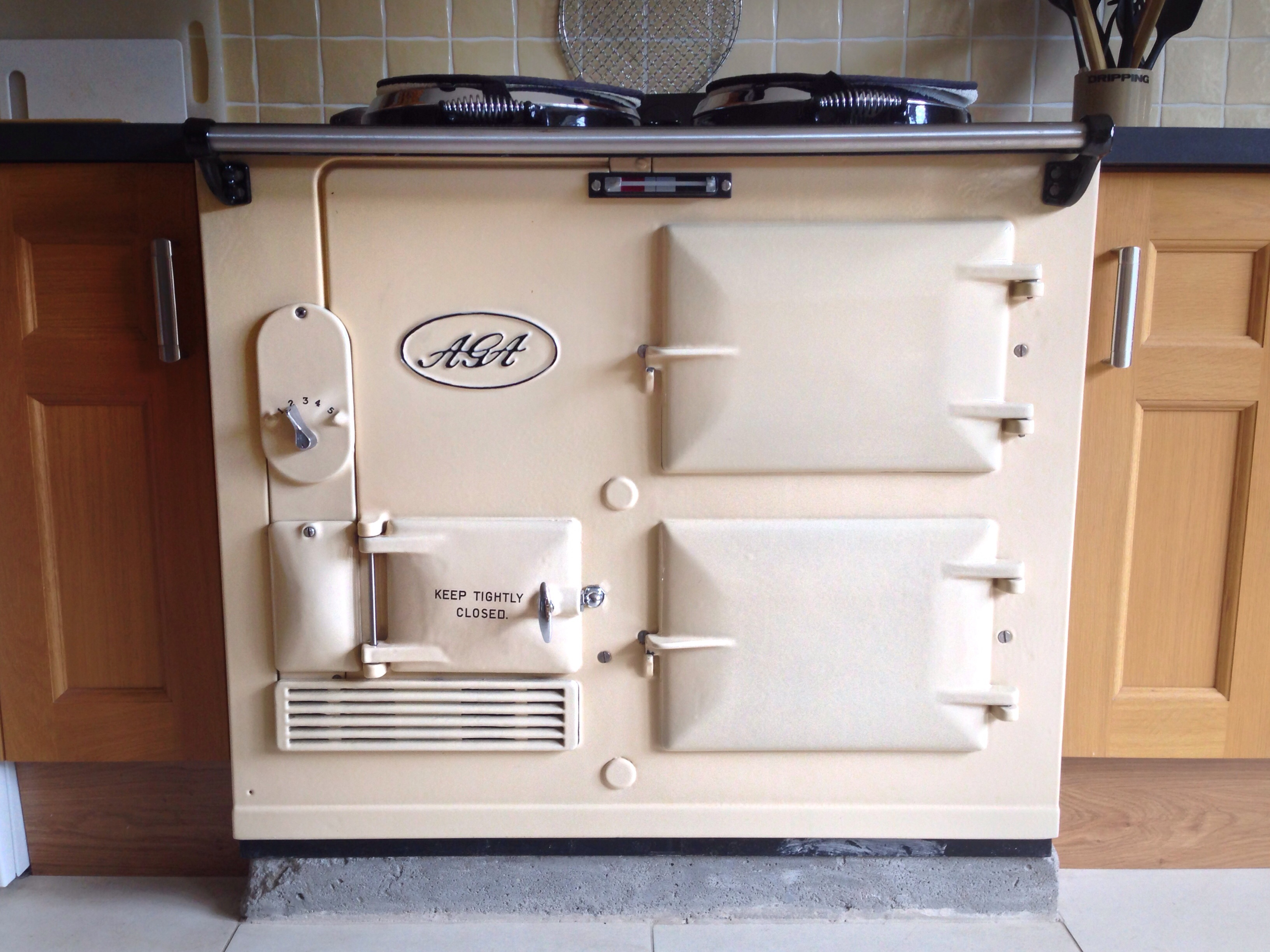
- Inventor: Gustaf Dalén
- Inception: 1922
- Manufacturer: AGA Rangemaster Limited
- Available: Yes
- Website: https://www.agaliving.com

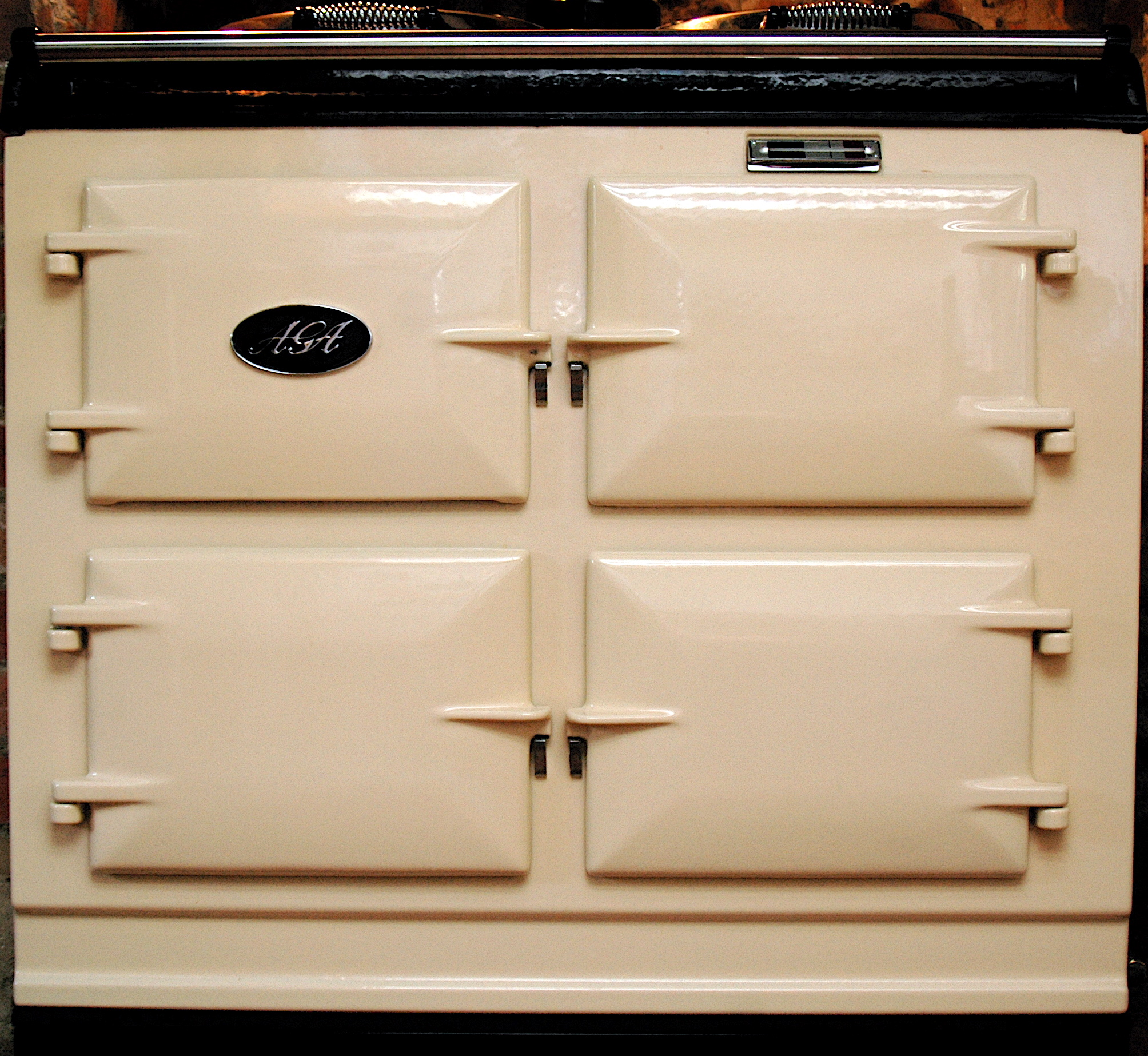
A modern-day three-oven AGA cooker. What appears to be a fourth oven door is the door to the burner.

The Aga range cooker is a Swedish range cooker. Invented and initially produced in Sweden, since 1957 most production has been located in the UK. In 2015, the British AGA cooker manufacturing company, AGA Rangemaster Group, was acquired by the American corporation Middleby.

== History ==
Originally developed to burn coal or anthracite, the Aga range cooker was invented in 1922 by the Nobel Prize-winning Swedish physicist Gustaf Dalén (1869–1937), who was employed as the chief engineer of the Swedish AGA company (Swedish Svenska Aktiebolaget Gasaccumulator, English Swedish Gas Accumulator, Limited). "AGA" stands for Aktiebolaget Gas Accumulator.

In 1912, Dalén lost his sight in an acetylene explosion while developing his earlier invention, a porous substrate for storing gases, Agamassan. Forced to stay at home, Dalén discovered that his wife was exhausted by cooking. Although blind, he set out to develop a new stove that was capable of a range of culinary techniques and easy to use.

Adopting the principle of heat storage, he combined a heat source, two large hotplates and two ovens into one unit: the Aga Range Cooker. The cooker was introduced to the United Kingdom in 1929, and was manufactured there under licence in the early 1930s. Its popularity in certain parts of British society (owners of medium to large houses in the country) led to the coining of the term 'AGA saga' in the 1990s, referring to a genre of fiction set amongst stereotypical upper-middle-class society.

David Ogilvy was initially hired as an Aga range cooker salesperson, before writing the 1935 sales manual for the product.

The cast-iron parts were cast at the Coalbrookdale foundry in the 1940s, where they were still made by the Aga Rangemaster Group until November 2017, when the new American owners Middleby closed the site with the loss of 35 jobs.

== Energy use ==
A small, traditional "always on" two-oven model running on gas will use approximately 425 kWh per week. The average standard gas oven and hob uses approximately 2.6% of the AGA range cooker's consumption. AGA's own figures for expected energy consumption for their two-oven model support this criticism, suggesting average consumption of 40 litres (9 gal. imp.) of kerosene or diesel fuel per week, 60 litres (13 gal. imp.) of propane gas per week, 425 kWh of natural gas per week, or 220 kWh/week for the electric models. This would indicate that the smallest traditional two-oven gas AGA range cooker providing simple cooking functions (i.e. not providing a water heater or central heating) consumes thirty-eight times as much as a standard gas oven and hob, almost as much gas in a week as a standard gas oven and hob in nine months.

AGA Rangemaster Group has provided an analysis of their own, which includes the steps taken to reduce energy consumption.

The majority of AGA range cookers still sold are programmable. The 2011 model, the Total Control, uses the same radiant heat to cook, but is designed to be switched off like a regular cooker when not in use, using far less energy. Oil burning models can be fitted with a modern pressure jet oil burner in place of the standard wick burner which burns the fuel more efficiently and so reduces oil consumption.

== Models ==
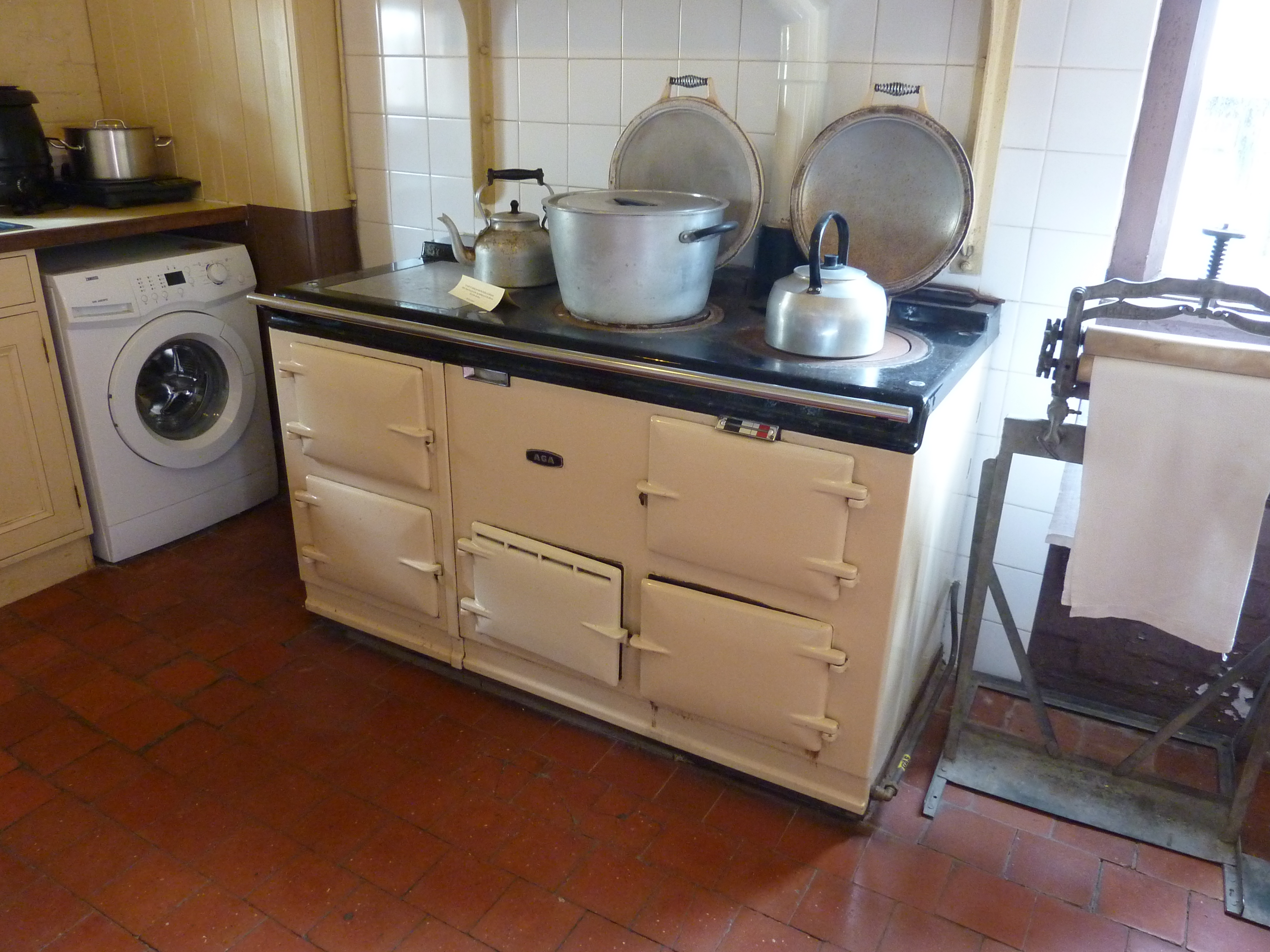
AGA cooker showing hot plates

AGA range cookers are available in 2, 3, 4 and 5 oven models with the 4 and 5 oven versions wider than the others. Traditional AGA range cookers have a boiling and simmering plate, or in newer models with one hotplate this can be set to either boiling or simmering mode.

While the classic AGA models are on all the time, the ovens and hotplates of the newer AGA range cookers (AGA 60, Total Control, 3 Series) can be switched on and off as required and the hotplates on the Dual Control cookers can be switched on and off, meaning there is heat in the room but energy is not used unnecessarily. The AGA 60 is the smallest in the range and is just 60 cm (2') wide.

The Aga Range Cooker is known for its longevity, with many cookers still operating after more than 50 years. In 2009, in conjunction with The Daily Telegraph and to celebrate the 80th anniversary of its founding, AGA Rangemaster set up a competition to find the oldest AGA range cooker still in use. There were thousands of entries, but the winning cooker was installed in 1932 and belonged to the Hett family of Sussex.

== See also ==
- Aga Rangemaster Group
