= Middleby =

American cooking equipment manufacturer

The Middleby Corporation
- Type: Public
- Traded as: Nasdaq: MIDD; S&P 400 component
- Industry: Commercial Cooking Equipment
- Predecessor: Middleby Marshall Inc.
- Founded: 1888; 138 years ago
- Headquarters: Elgin, Illinois, U.S.
- Area served: International
- Key people: Timothy FitzGerald (CEO); Bryan Mittelman (CFO); David Brewer (COO); Martin M. Lindsay (treasurer)
- Revenue: US$2.722 billion (2018)
- Net income: US$317.15 million (2018)
- Number of employees: 9,778
- Website: middleby.com

The Middleby Corporation is a publicly traded American company based in Elgin, Illinois. The company manufactures commercial cooking equipment, industrial processing equipment, and residential appliances. The commercial cooking equipment side of Middleby does business with 97 out of the top 100 food service chains in the United States and internationally.

== History ==
=== Portable ovens ===
The company was founded by Joseph Middleby and John Marshall in Chicago in 1888 as a bakery supplier. The company made custom portable ovens for the bakery industry. Middleby sold the company to Marshall in the early 1900s. The company was privately held by descendants of Marshall until it was purchased by a private company in 1976. The company was purchased by TMC Industries Ltd. in 1983 and changed its name to The Middleby Corporation in 1985 and moved its headquarters to Elgin, Illinois in the late 1980s.

=== Expansion ===
By 1996, the company had expanded its manufacturing base overseas and had opened a manufacturing and training facility employing 190 in Santa Rosa, Laguna, the Philippines.

By 2006, the company had successfully streamlined operations to an extent allowing them to close two of its seven manufacturing facilities in the United States with no loss of product lines or capacity; this was in addition to three facilities shut down in 2001 and 2002. Also in the 2001 to 2006 period, the company's income yield from sales increased from about 3% to just over 10%, while its stock valuation increased by over 15-fold, (Note: 3% figure based on $3.5 million in income on $127 million in sales; 10% figure based on $31.3 million in income on $304.9 million in sales; 15-fold figure based on increase from $6 to $100 per share.) performance gains which were attributed to CEO Bassoul.

The Middleby Corporation was originally available for purchase on the NASDAQ over-the-counter market and became listed on the American Stock Exchange in 1988. Its first public offering came in September 1997 with a share price offering of $10 on the NASDAQ. Selim Bassoul became the CEO of Middleby in January 2001.

=== McDonald's ice cream machines ===
In 2021, the company was criticized in the media for producing ice cream machines for McDonald's that were intentionally unreliable and difficult to repair as a means to drive up maintenance revenue. They were sued by the makers of an app, Kytch, that assisted with repair.

=== Acquisitions ===
Middleby has acquired numerous businesses in the US and internationally. In 1990, Middleby acquired a majority stake in Asbury Associates Inc., a Filipino manufacturer of food service equipment. It increased its interest to 80% by 1991 and became the company's main export distributor internationally with the exception of Canada where Middleby already owned a distributor. The same year, it established Fab-Asia, Inc., a separate unit in Manila for manufacturing of kitchen equipment for markets in Asia and the United States.

Middleby initiated assimilation of MagiKitch'n brands in 2010 to their commercial appliance line.

Middleby purchased TurboChef in 2008 in a deal reported to be worth $200 million. It was reported by Bassoul that the purchase would strengthen the company's position as a leader in the food service equipment industry. Both companies were previously competitors in food service equipment for speed cooking pizza ovens.

In 2013, The Middleby Corporation purchased Viking Range for US$380 million from investors Warren Stephens and Fred Carl, Jr., the latter of whom would continue at the helm of the new subsidiary. Middleby announced that it would incorporate its technology into Viking equipment and increase residential sales, which were approximately 1% to 2% of the company's overall sales prior to the purchase. The acquisition was said to be the largest in the company's history, bringing 750 employees into the company.

In July 2015, Aga Rangemaster Group, the British manufacturer of cast-iron cooking ranges was acquired for £129 million.

In 2016, Middleby acquired Follett Ice in Easton, Pennsylvania.

In May 2018, Taylor Company, a manufacturer of ice cream dispensing equipment and frozen drink machines was acquired for $1 billion.

In December 2021, The Middleby Corporation purchased consumer grill manufacturers Kamado Joe, Masterbuilt, and Char-Griller, which were estimated to expand the revenues of the Middleby Residential platform to more than $1 billion.

In July 2022, Middleby acquired CP Packaging, a US-based equipment manufacturer.

== Products and brands ==
- Anets
- APW Wyott
- Bakers Pride
- Beech
- BKI
- Blodgett
- Bloomfield
- Britannia
- Carter Hoffmann
- Celfrost
- Concordia
- CookTek
- Crown
- CTX (specialized in conveyor ovens)
- Desmon
- Doyon
- Eswood
- EVO America
- Firex
- FriFri
- Follett
- Giga
- Globe
- Goldstein
- Holman
- Houno
- IMC
- Jade
- JoeTap
- Josper
- Lab2Fab
- Lang
- Lincat
- Magic Kitch'n
- Market Forge
- Marsal
- Marvel Scientific
- Middleby Marshall (specialized in conveyor ovens)
- Nieco
- NuVu (or Nu-Vu)
- Perfect Fry
- Pitco
- Qualserv
- Southbend
- SS Brewtech
- Star
- Sveba Dahlen
- Taylor Company
- Toastmaster
- Turbochef
- U-Line Commercial
- Ultrafryer
- Varimixer
- Wells
- Wunder-Bar

=== Industrial processing ===
- Alkar
- Armor Inox
- Auto-Bake
- Baker
- Cozzini
- CVP Systems
- Danfotech
- Drake
- Hinds-Bock
- Maurer-Atmos
- MP Equipment
- RapidPak
- Spooner Vicars
- Stewart
- Thurne
- Ve.Ma.C

=== Residential ===
- Aga Rangemaster (acquired July 2015)
- Brava Home
- Char-Griller
- Falcon
- Grange
- Kamado Joe
- La Cornue
- Lynx
- Marvel
- Masterbuilt
- Rayburn Range
- Viking
- Waterford Stanley
- Novy (2021)

=== Former brands ===
- Victory Refrigeration: a former subsidiary and brand engaged in development of refrigeration technology; sold in 1996 to "an investor group led by local management" of the subsidiary.

== Awards and recognition ==
Middleby has received awards and recognition, including numerous supplier awards. In 2013 it was recognized as the Supplier Partner of the Year by Brinker International, after installing approximately 1,200 ovens in the company's Chili's restaurants. It was recognized as one of the best stocks of the millennium by The Motley Fool and featured as a hot growth company in BusinessWeek.

Middleby has been on the Forbes' list of 200 Best Small Companies numerous times, including being listed as #12 in 2004, #10 in 2005, #9 in 2006, and continuing 9 consecutive years receiving recognition as #25 on the list in 2012. The United States Department of Commerce recognized Middleby in 1997 with the President's "E" Award. The award was given to a total of 11 firms in the United States for recognition of their success in exporting. It was recognized again for its exporting in 2001 as a recipient of the Governor's Export Award presented by then Illinois Governor George Ryan.

Middleby made the Crain's Chicago Business Fast 50 list in 2013, also being recognized on the list in 2007 and 2009. It received a NRA Kitchen Innovations Award in 2013 for its WOW! Ovens, currently in use by the top nine pizza chains. It was also featured in the 2011 book Innovating...Chicago-style: How Local Innovators Are Building the National Economy.
