= Follett Ice =

American manufacturer of ice machines

Follett Products LLC
- Company type: Subsidiary
- Founded: 1948; 78 years ago
- Headquarters: Easton, Pennsylvania and Gdańsk, Poland
- Products: ice machines, ice transport and storage, ice and beverage dispensers
- Services: Food service
- Parent: Middleby Corporation
- Website: http://www.follettice.com/

Follett Products LLC is a subsidiary of Middleby Corporation that manufactures nugget (Chewblet) ice makers for the healthcare, foodservice, hospitality, and supermarket industries as well as ice and water dispensers, and refrigerators and freezers for patient care. Headquartered in Easton, Pennsylvania, the company operates two manufacturing facilities in Easton, Pennsylvania and Gdańsk, Poland.

In 1948, following World War II, Roy Follett saw an opportunity to fill a need in ice storage. He founded Follett Corporation to "supply ice storage bins to meet the needs of the exploding foodservice industry," according to Thomas R. Cutler.

Follett milestones include:

- 1948 - Founded by Roy Follett in Garden City, New York
- 1954 - Don Follett took over the company
- 1967 - A new manufacturing plant opened in Easton, Pennsylvania
- 1994 - Steve Follett, Roy Follet's grandson, assumed the CEO role
- 2005 - A new manufacturing facility opens in Gdańsk, Poland
- 2015 - A new manufacturing facility opens in Bethlehem, Pennsylvania
- 2016 - Follett Corporation is acquired by The Middleby Corporation and becomes Follett LLC, an independent operating company of Middleby
- 2019 - Steve Follett retires. He is succeeded by Korey Kohl, Middleby Group President overseeing the Middleby Beverage Group

Today, Follett LLC still builds ice storage and transport systems, ice and water dispensers, ice and beverage dispensers, and medical-grade refrigerators and freezers for foodservice and healthcare markets. Follett products can be found in hospitals, restaurants, Major League Baseball stadiums and casinos around the country, and in the 2022 Winter Olympics in Beijing.

== See also ==
- List of ice companies
