= Viking Range =

American kitchen appliance company

Viking Range Corporation
- Type: Subsidiary
- Founded: 1987; 39 years ago
- Founder: Fred Carl, Jr.
- Headquarters: Greenwood, Mississippi, United States
- Products: Ranges, Oven, Cooktops, Refrigerators
- Parent: Middleby Corporation
- Website: www.vikingrange.com

Viking Range Corporation is an American appliance company that manufactures kitchen appliances for residential and commercial use. Today the company offers three complete lines of premium appliances including cooking, ventilation, kitchen clean-up and refrigeration, as well as various outdoor appliances. Viking originated the "professional" segment of kitchen appliances with its introduction of the first professional-grade range for home use in 1987. In addition to its "Professional" (and less expensive) "Designer" series, Viking's latest offering is their new "Commercial" line of kitchen appliances for use in restaurant and other commercial kitchens. Headquartered on historic Cotton Row in downtown Greenwood, Mississippi, Viking Range employs more than 1,000 people at four manufacturing facilities in Leflore County. In 2013, the Middleby Corporation acquired Viking Range Corporation for $380 million in cash. Within a couple of months of the acquisition the company laid off one-fifth of its employees.

Viking is not to be confused with the "house brand" of appliances from the Canadian department store Eaton's which went bankrupt in 1999, and which also used the name "Viking.”

== Viking's relationship with Greenwood, Mississippi ==
Viking opened The Alluvian Hotel in its headquarters city of Greenwood, Mississippi as a tourist destination in 2003. Built as a subsidiary of Viking Range, The Alluvian is a boutique hotel located in the old Hotel Irving in historic downtown Greenwood.

In 2005, Viking opened a 7,000-square-foot (650 m^{2}) destination spa, a cooking school and a restaurant. The Alluvian Spa, Viking Cooking School, and Giardina's Restaurant are part of Viking Hospitality Group, providing training and demonstrations.

== 2011 product safety settlement ==
In June 2011, the US Consumer Product Safety Commission (CPSC) accepted a settlement under which Viking agreed to pay $450,000 in civil penalties to settle charges that it failed to report defects in its refrigerators.

Between 1999 and 2006, Viking manufactured side by side and bottom-freezer refrigerators that were alleged to be unsafe by the CPSC. Viking issued a recall in 2009. Viking denied any violations and a final settlement was made with the CPSC on June 28, 2011.

== 2017 product safety settlement ==
In April 2017, the US Consumer Product Safety Commission (CPSC) provisionally accepted a settlement under which Viking agreed to pay $4.6 million in civil penalties to settle charges that "Viking failed to immediately report to CPSC that its gas ranges contained a defect that could create a substantial product hazard or that the ranges created an unreasonable risk of serious injury."

"Between 2008 and 2014, Viking received 170 incident reports of ranges that had turned on spontaneously and could not be turned off using the control knobs, resulting in extreme surface temperatures that posed a burn hazard to consumers. The reported incidents included two consumers who were unable to turn off the range using the controls and were burned while attempting to disconnect the power source. Viking also received five reports that the ranges had turned on spontaneously and caused property damage to the area surrounding the range. Several consumers called 911 for assistance when they discovered that the ranges had turned on spontaneously and could not be turned off or disconnected. Viking knew of this information, but failed to notify CPSC immediately of the defect or risk posed by the ranges, as required by federal law."

"Viking recalled 52,000 ranges in May 2015. The ranges were sold at ABT, Ferguson, Morrison, Pacific Sales, PC Richard & Son and other stores nationwide from July 2007 through June 2014 for between $4,000 and $13,000."
