= AGA Rangemaster Group =

British manufacturer

AGA Rangemaster Limited
- Formerly: Glynwed Consumer Products Limited (1999–2001); AGA Consumer Products Limited (2001–2010)
- Type: Subsidiary
- Traded as: LSE: AGA
- Founded: 1939
- Headquarters: Leamington Spa, England
- Number of employees: 2,500
- Parent: Middleby Corporation
- Website: agarangemaster.com

AGA Rangemaster Limited is a British manufacturer of range cookers, kitchen appliances, and interior furnishings owned by Middleby Corporation in September 2015 after it received a takeover approach from Whirlpool. It employs just over 2,500 people worldwide. AGA stands for Aktiebolaget Gas Accumulator.

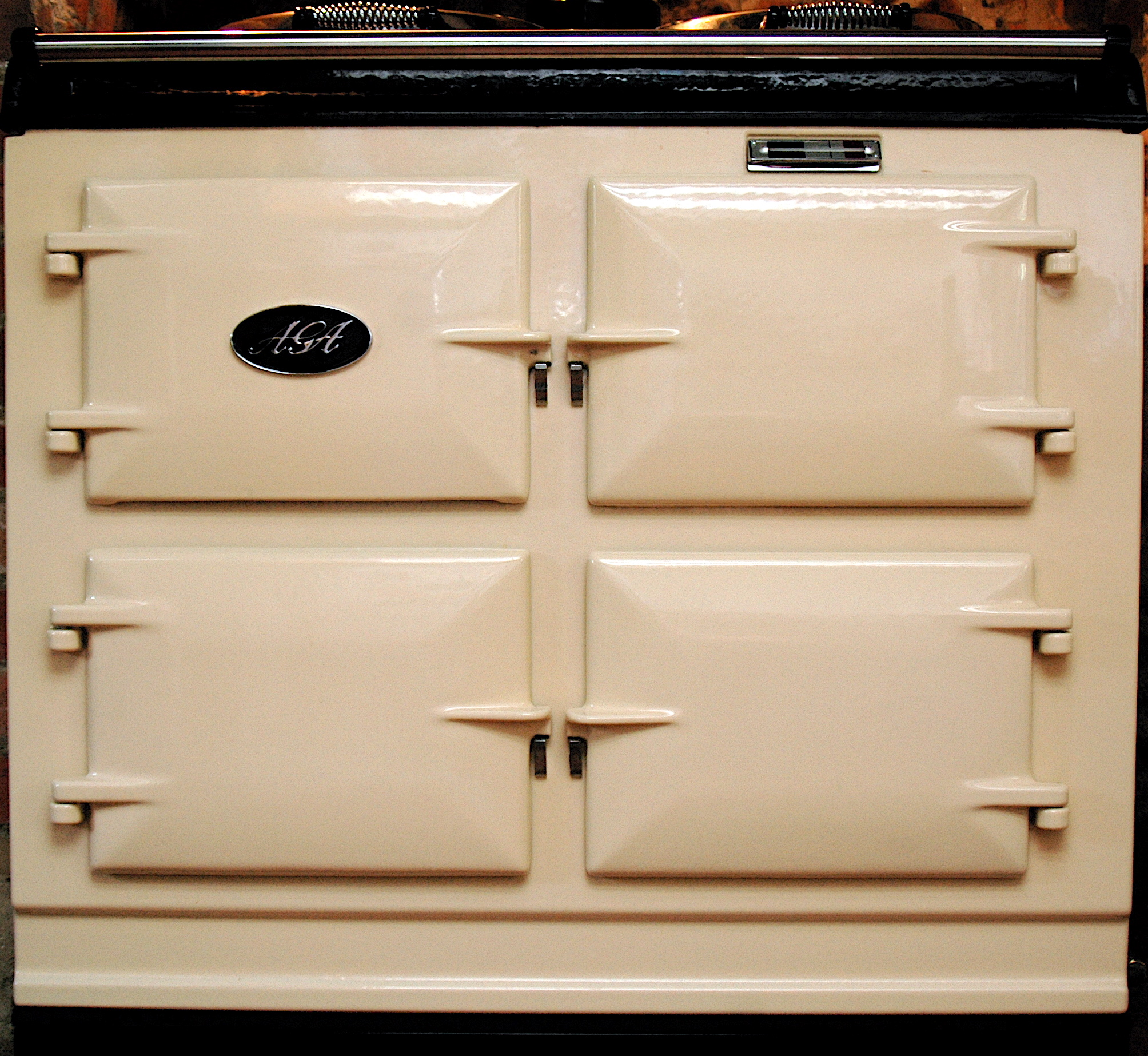
Aga GC3

Aga Rangemaster (formerly Aga Foodservice Group, LSE: AGA) is the manufacturer of the eponymous cast iron cooker and oven (the AGA Cooker) headquartered in Leamington Spa, Warwickshire, England. The North American subsidiary of AGA Rangemaster is AGA Marvel which distributes AGA Rangemaster cooking products under the AGA brand name as well as being the manufacturer of Marvel full sized refrigeration and undercounter refrigeration products such as wine cellars, beverage centers, refrigerated drawers, etc.

== Products and brands ==
AGA Rangemaster Group Limited, owns a number of brands including La Cornue, Rangemaster, Divertimenti, Fired Earth, AGA, and Marvel. It manufactures Rayburn and Rangemaster stoves, and various other kitchen equipment, cookware and kitchen furnishings.

The Rayburn range was originally a separate product that was produced in the same factory as the Aga cooker.

== History ==
Glynwed, later Glynwed International, was formed in 1939 through the merger of "Glynn Brothers, Builders and Plumbers Merchants of Birmingham" (engineering and plumbing materials) with sister company "The Wednesbury Tube Company" (solid drawn copper tubes). During World War II it made a range of war equipment including brass bars for shell rings and ammunition driving bands. In the aftermath of the war, the company reverted to copper tubes and benefited from the post-WW2 housing boom.

Having traded as a public company since 1941, Glynwed expanded rapidly adding additional companies to the group, including in 1969 Allied Ironfounders, the manufacturers of AGA cookers, an integrated oil burning oven system. However, Glynwed was acquired by Mueller Industries Inc. (USA) in 1997, and subsequently underwent major reorganisation in 2001, with the pipes business being sold to Etex Group for £786 million, and the remainder being renamed AGA Foodservice. In 2003 Rangemaster was added, and subsequently the firm was renamed Aga Rangemaster in 2008. Middleby Corporation acquired the group in 2015 for £129 million, closing the Coalbrookdale manufacturing plant in 2017.

=== Timeline ===
- 1998 - Focus on just 2 core growth activities – PipeSystems & Consumer & Foodservice
- 1999 - Major acquisitions in the US and North America (IPEX, Victory Refrigeration)
- 2000 - Group is split into Pipe Systems and Consumer and Foodservice operations.
- 2001 - Pipe Systems operations sold to Belgian Group, Etex, for £800m. Capital return made. AGA Foodservice Group becomes the new name for the Group.
- 2002 - Focus on creating a major international consumer brand-led operation. Acquisition of a stake in Grange in France provides continental European foothold.
- 2003 - AGA and Rangemaster post record performances. Acquisition of Northland - Marvel in the US.
- 2005 - Acquisitions of Waterford Stanley. Divertimenti and Heartland Appliances strengthens consumer offering.
- 2007 - Foodservice operations sold as Group concentrates on its strong portfolio of consumer brands. Capital return made bringing total return since 2001 to £600m.
- 2008 - AGA Rangemaster is created from the remaining consumer businesses.
- 2009 - Acquisition of Mercury and Thermastone cooker brands from Lincat for £0.4m. US operations integrated under the AGA Marvel banner.
- 2011 - Redfyre Cookers and Don Heating Products businesses acquired from Gazco Ltd for £0.8m.
- 2012 - Entered into a bilateral agreement with the Chinese gas burner appliance group Vatti
- 2015 - Acquired by the American company Middleby Corporation for £129m million
- 2017 - Closed the Coalbrookdale Foundry

AGA and Rangemaster lead the portfolio of consumer brands which include Divertimenti, Falcon, Mercury, Fired Earth, Grange, Heartland, La Cornue, Leisure Sinks, Redfyre, Marvel, Rayburn and Stanley.
