= Kitchen stove =

Kitchen appliance designed for the purpose of cooking food

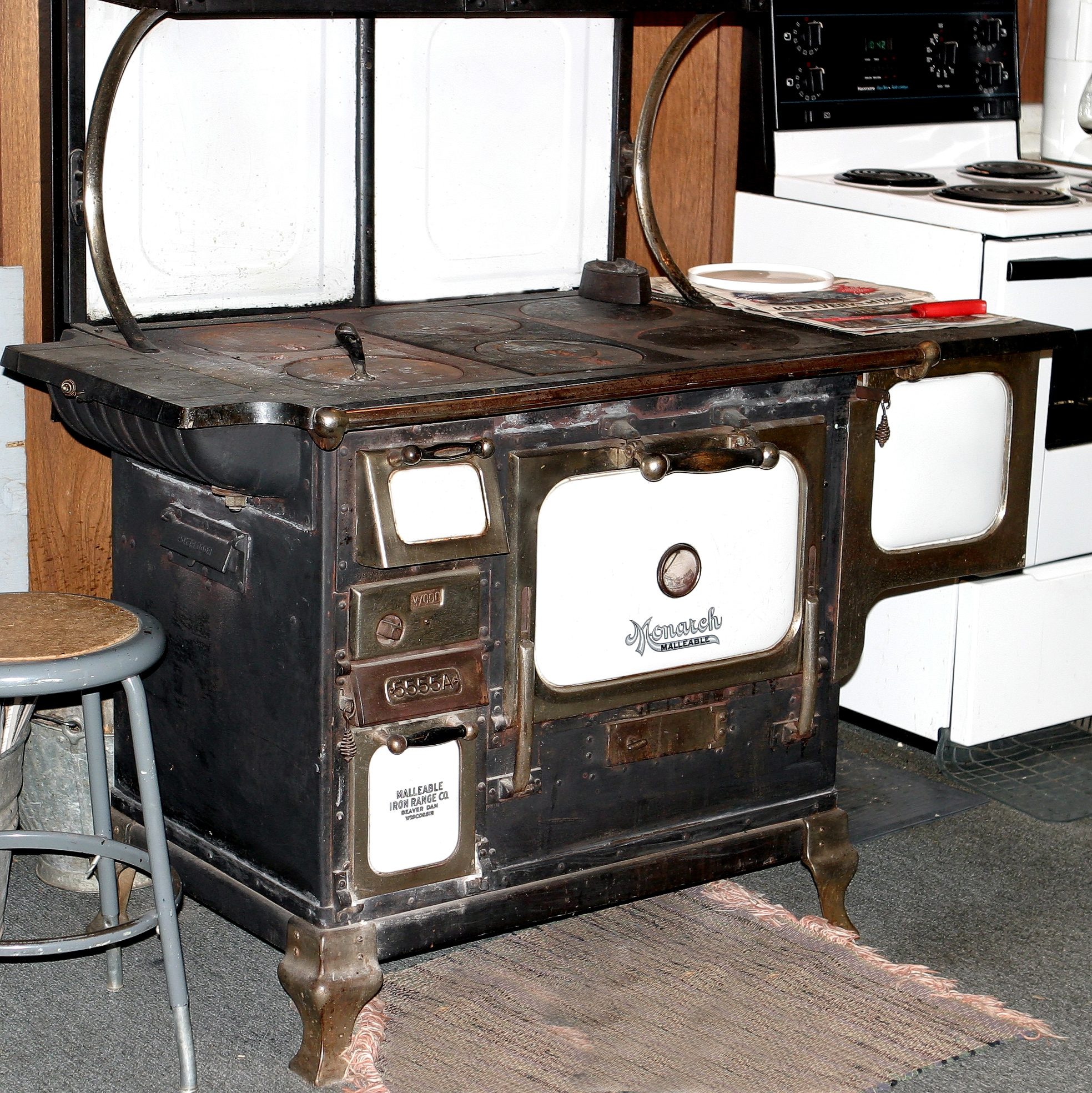
A wood-burning iron stove

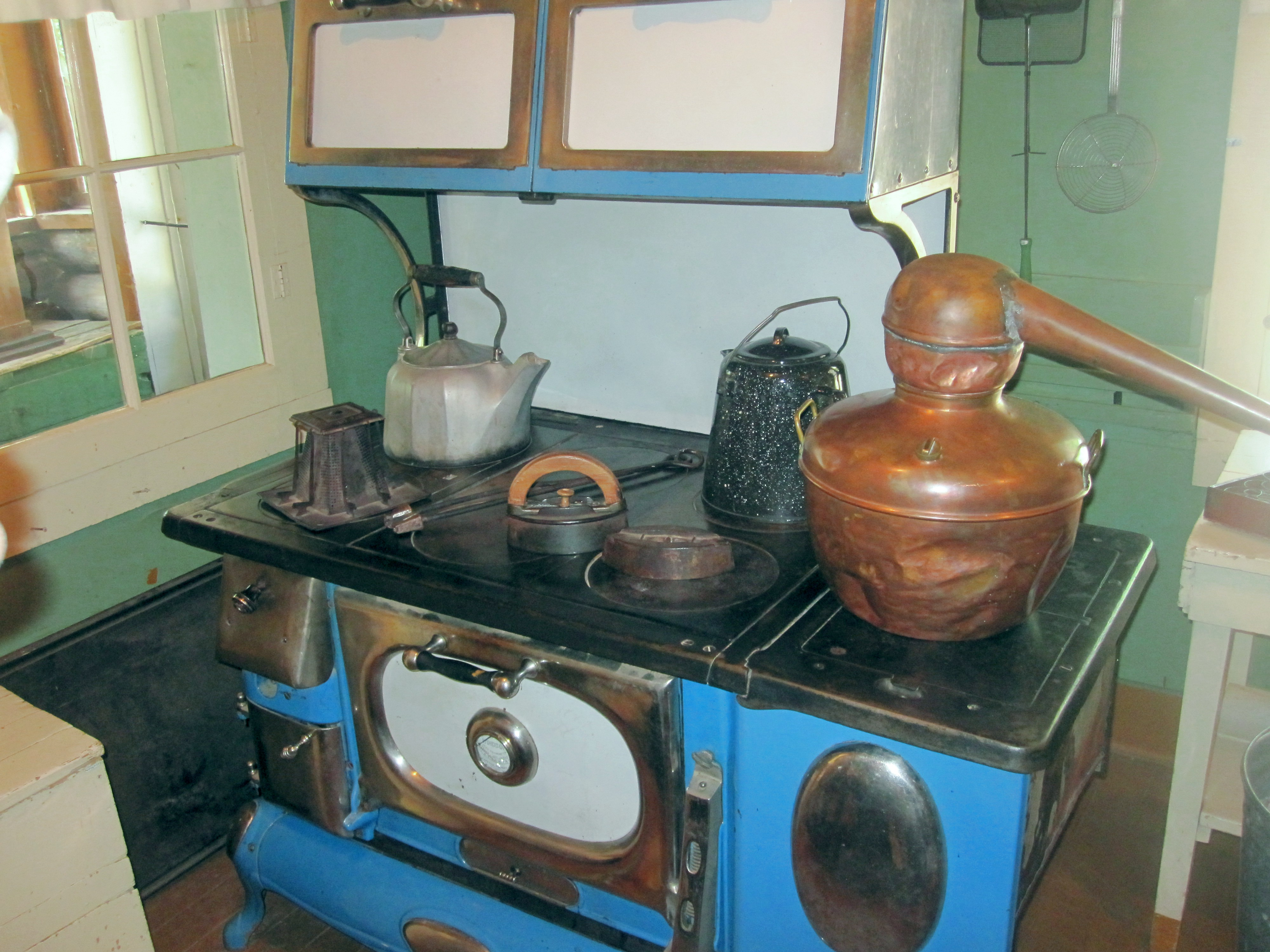
A stove at Holzwarth Ranch, Colorado

A kitchen stove, often called simply a stove or a cooker, is a kitchen appliance designed for the purpose of cooking food. Kitchen stoves rely on the application of direct heat for the cooking process and may also contain an oven, used for baking. Cookstoves (also called "cooking stoves" or "wood stoves") are heated by burning wood or charcoal; gas stoves are heated by gas; and electric stoves by electricity. A stove with a built-in cooktop is also called a range.

In the industrialized world, as stoves replaced open fires and braziers as a source of more efficient and reliable heating, models were developed that could also be used for cooking, and these came to be known as kitchen stoves. When homes began to be heated with central heating systems, there was less need for an appliance that served as both heat source and cooker and stand-alone cookers replaced them. Cooker and stove are often used interchangeably.

The fuel-burning stove is the most basic design of a kitchen stove. As of 2012, "nearly half of the people in the world (mainly in the developing world), burn biomass (wood, charcoal, crop residues, and dung) and coal in rudimentary cookstoves or open fires to cook their food." More fuel-efficient and environmentally sound biomass cookstoves are being developed for use there.

Natural gas and electric stoves are the most common in developed countries. Electricity may reduce environmental impact if generated from non-fossil sources. The choice between the two is mostly a matter of personal preference and availability of utilities. Bottled gas ranges are used where utilities are unavailable.

Modern kitchen stoves have an oven, and often have a "stovetop" or "cooktop" in Simplified English; known as the "hob" in English, from Hob (hearth). A "drop-in range" is a combination stovetop-and-oven unit that installs in a kitchen's lower cabinets flush with the countertop. Most modern stoves come in a unit with built-in extractor hoods. Today's major brands offer both gas and electric stoves, and many also offer dual-fuel ranges combining a gas stovetop and an electric oven.

== History ==
=== Early kitchen stoves ===
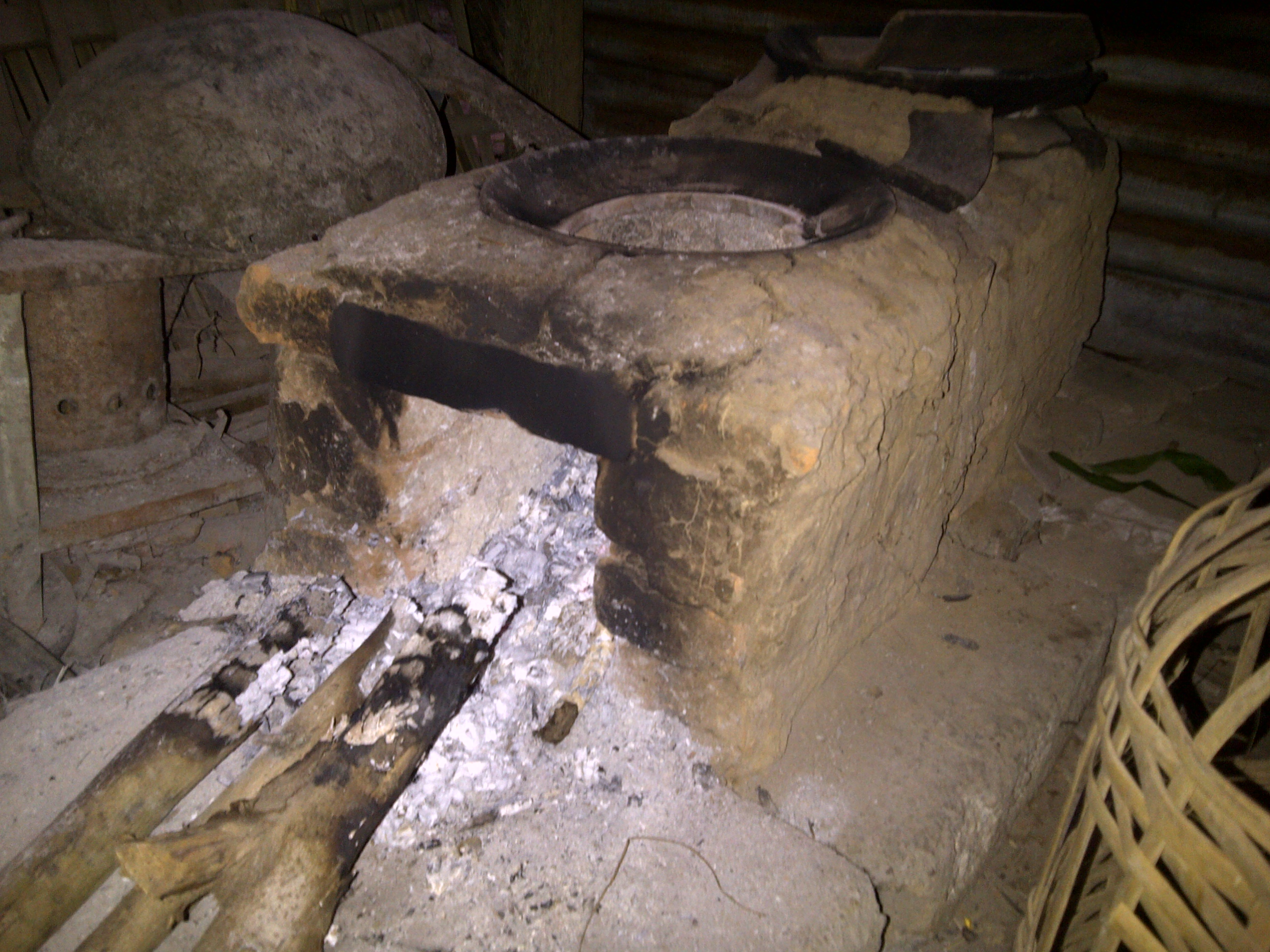
Indonesian traditional brick stove, used in some rural areas

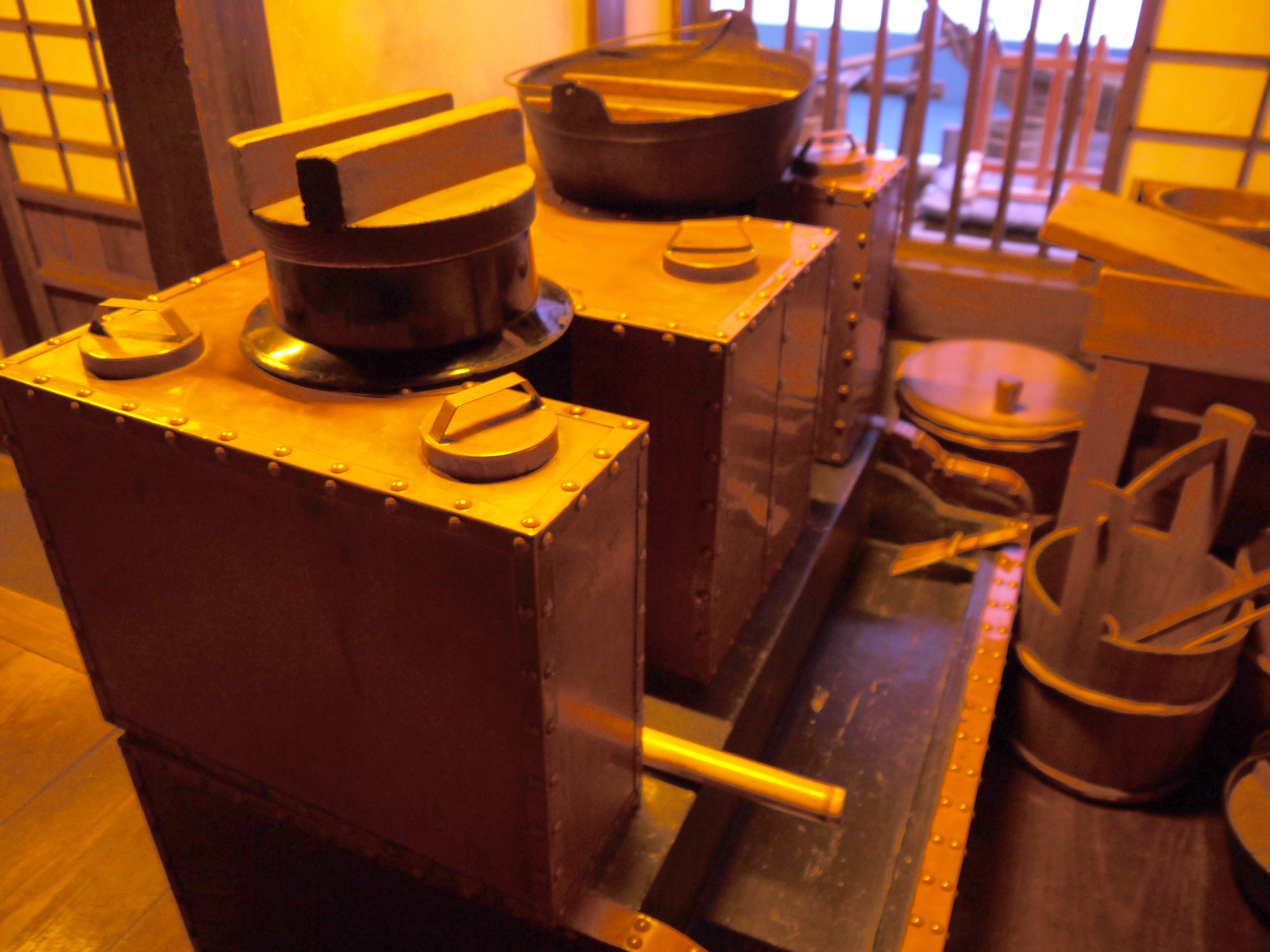
An 18th-century Japanese merchant's kitchen with copper Kamado (Hezzui), Fukagawa Edo Museum

Early clay stoves that enclosed the fire completely were known from the Chinese Qin dynasty (221 BC – 206/207 BC), and a similar design known as kamado (かまど) appeared in the Kofun period (3rd–6th century) in Japan.

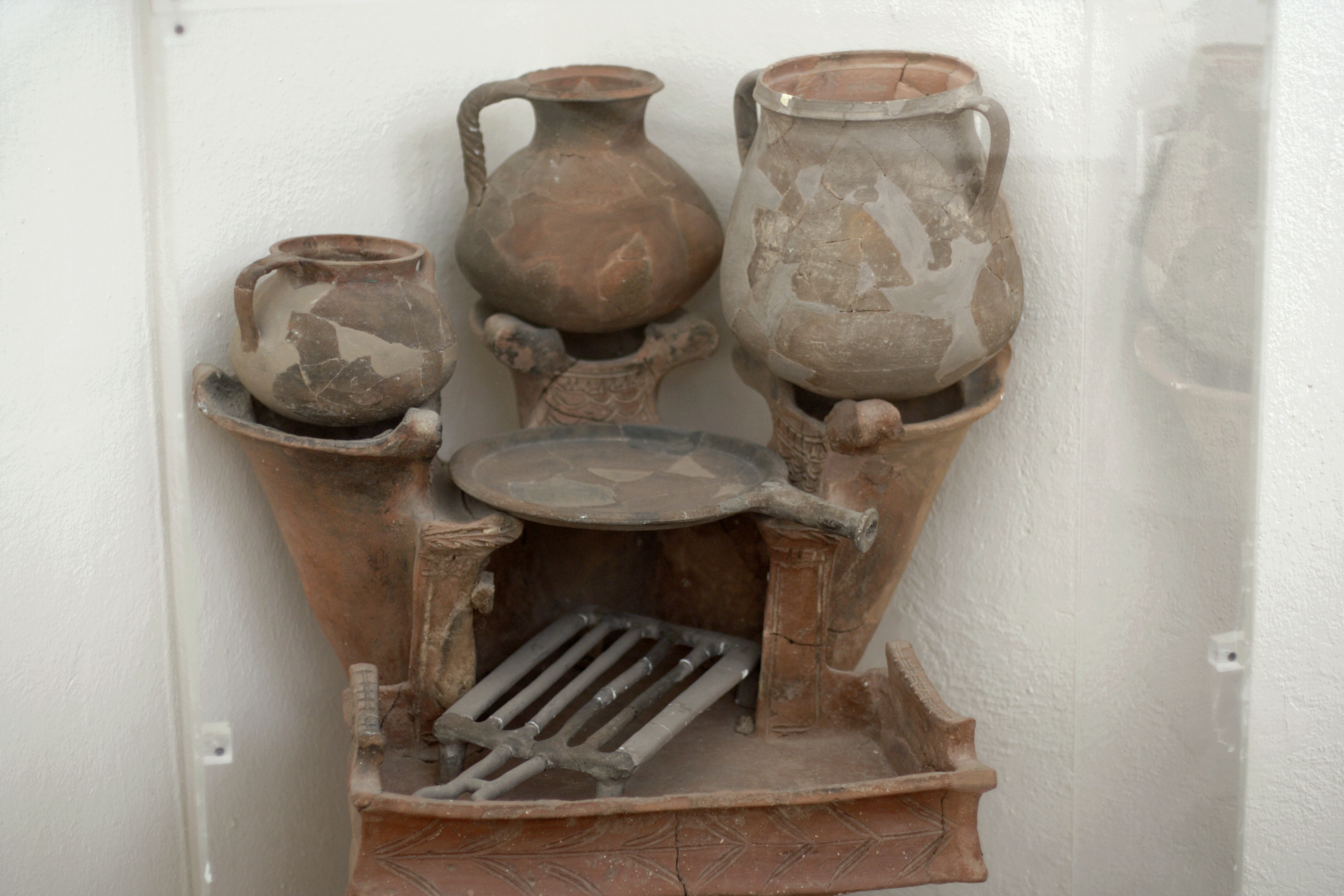
Roman-era stove, Delos, Greece

Brick and Iron (Craticula) stoves were used across the Roman Empire, several example are preserved at Herculaneum and Pompeii.

These stoves were fired by wood or charcoal through a hole in the front. In both designs, pots were placed over or hung into holes at the top of the knee-high construction. In the Middle East, references to similar stoves and cooking ranges where the fire was lit from below are recorded as early as the 2nd-century AD, constructed of clay and either made portable or attached to the ground. Raised kamados were developed in Japan during the Edo period (1603–1867).

Prior to the 18th century in Europe, people cooked over open fires fueled by wood. In the Middle Ages, waist-high brick-and-mortar hearths and the first chimneys appeared, so that cooks no longer had to kneel or sit to tend to foods on the fire. The fire was built on top of the construction; the cooking done mainly in cauldrons hung above the fire or placed on trivets. The heat was regulated by placing the cauldron higher or lower above the fire.

Open fire systems had three significant disadvantages that prompted an evolutionary series of improvements from the 16th century onwards: it was dangerous, it produced much smoke, and the heat efficiency was poor. Attempts were made to enclose the fire to make better use of the heat that is generated and thus reduce the wood consumption. An early step was the fire chamber: the fire was enclosed on three sides by brick-and-mortar walls and covered by an iron plate. This technique also caused a change in the kitchenware used for cooking, for it required flat-bottomed pots instead of cauldrons. The first design that completely enclosed the fire was the 1735 Castrol stove, built by the Walloon-Bavarian architect François de Cuvilliés. This stove was a masonry construction with several fire holes covered by perforated iron plates and was also known as a stew stove. Near the end of the 18th century, the design was refined by hanging the pots in holes through the top iron plate, thus improving heat efficiency even more.

=== Origins of the modern kitchen range ===
The modern kitchen range was invented by Sir Benjamin Thompson, Count Rumford in the 1790s. As an active scientist and prolific inventor, he put the study of heat onto a scientific basis and developed improvements for chimneys, fireplaces and industrial furnaces, which led to his invention of the kitchen range.

His Rumford fireplace created a sensation in London when he introduced the idea of restricting the chimney opening to increase the updraught. This was a much more efficient way to heat a room than earlier fireplaces. He and his workers modified fireplaces by inserting bricks into the hearth to make the side walls angled, and added a choke to the chimney to increase the speed of air going up the flue. The effect was to produce a streamlined air flow, so all the smoke would go up into the chimney rather than lingering and entering the room. It also had the effect of increasing the efficiency of the fire, and gave extra control of the rate of combustion of the fuel, whether wood or coal. Many fashionable London houses were modified to his instructions, and became free of smoke.

Following on from this success, Thompson designed a kitchen range made of brick, with a cylindrical oven and holes in the top for the insertion of pots. When not needed, the opening could be covered over leaving the fire to smolder gently. This kitchen range was much more fuel efficient than the prevailing open hearth method and to a great degree safer. His range was widely adopted in large cooking establishments, including at the soup kitchens that Thompson built in Bavaria. However, it was too big and unwieldy to make much of an impact on domestic cooking.

The first half of the nineteenth century witnessed a steady improvement in stove design. Cast iron stoves replaced those made of masonry and their size shrank to allow them to be incorporated into the domestic kitchen. By the 1850s, the modern kitchen, equipped with a cooking range, was a fixture of middle-class homes. In 1850 Mary Evard invented the Reliance Cook Stove, which was divided in two with one half for dry baking and the other half for moist. Patents issued to Mary Evard are U.S. patent 76,315 and U.S. patent 76,314 on April 7, 1868. She demonstrated this stove with her husband at the St. Louis World's Fair.

In 1867 Elizabeth Hawks of New York invented and received U.S. patent 64,102 for a baking attachment for stoves, intended to spread heat thoroughly throughout loaves while keeping the top crust tender, which she called an "Auxiliary Air-chamber for Stoves." This was so successful that she sold two thousand within months of its release.

Stoves of that era commonly burned charcoal as well as wood. These stoves had flat tops and the heat was concentrated on one side of the stove top so that cooks could cook things at different temperatures based on where the pot or pan was located. This was called the "piano" system. After coal was replaced with gas, French chefs continued to prefer the smooth cooking surface and so the majority of French gas stoves had flat metal surfaces over the gas burners, which continues to be known as the "French style" today.

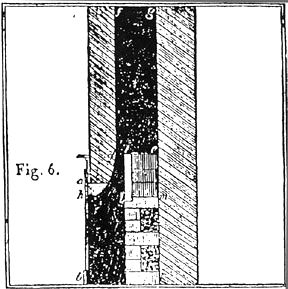
Section of Rumford fireplace, invented by Sir Benjamin Thompson

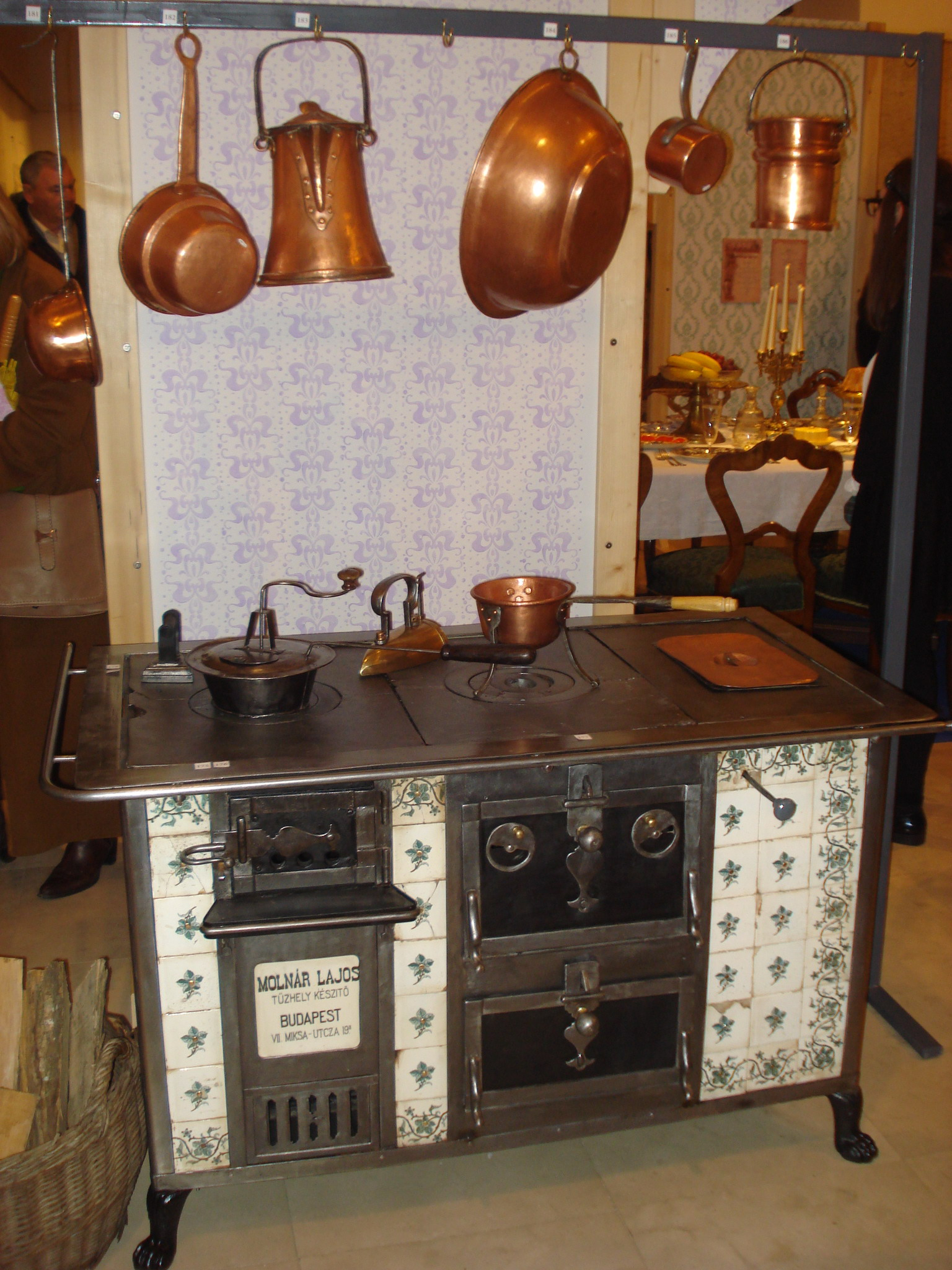
A 19th-century stove made in Budapest exhibited in the Međimurje County Museum, Croatia

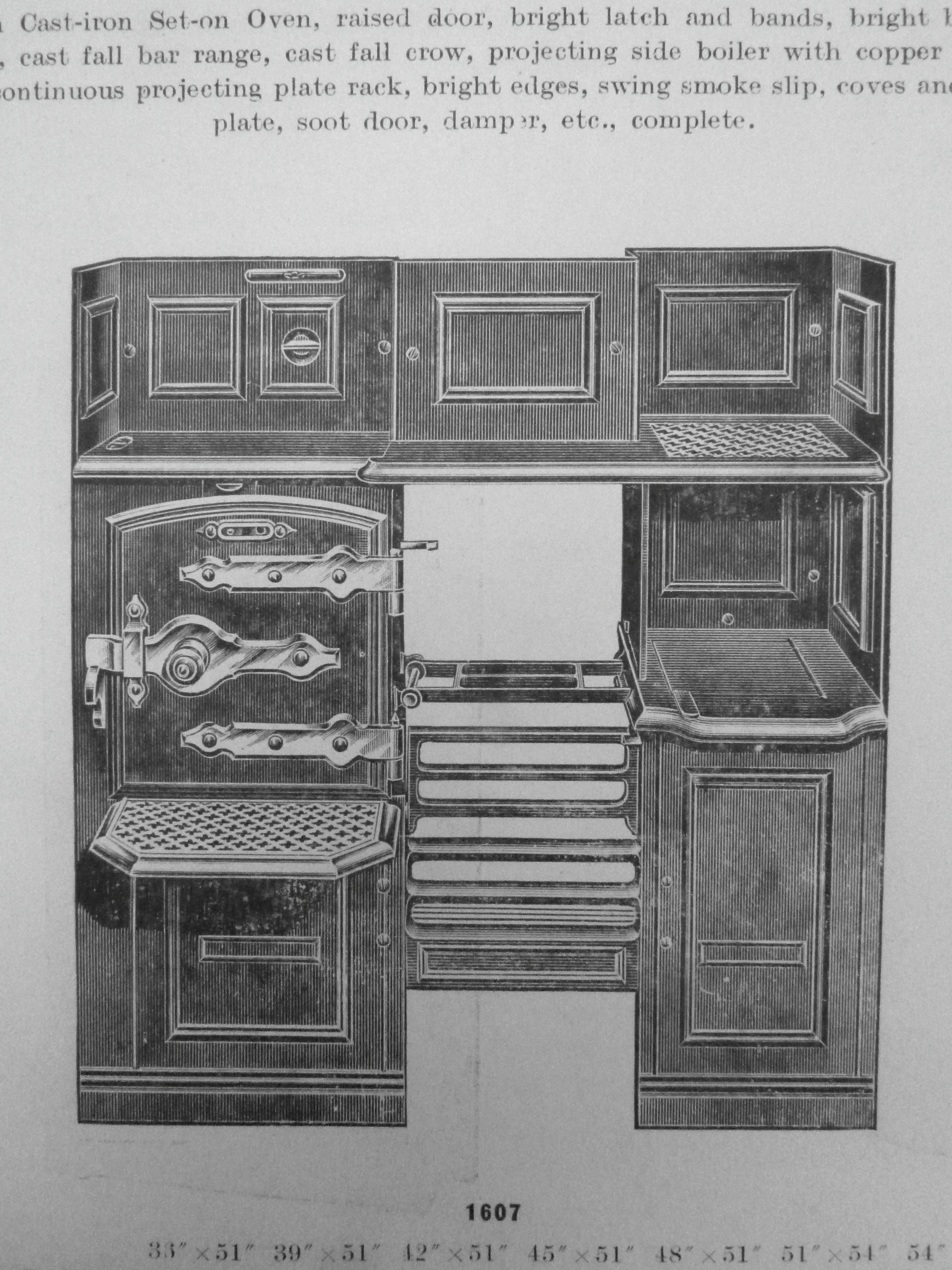
British-style Kitchen range by Fred Verity & Sons, 1890s

=== Gas stove ===
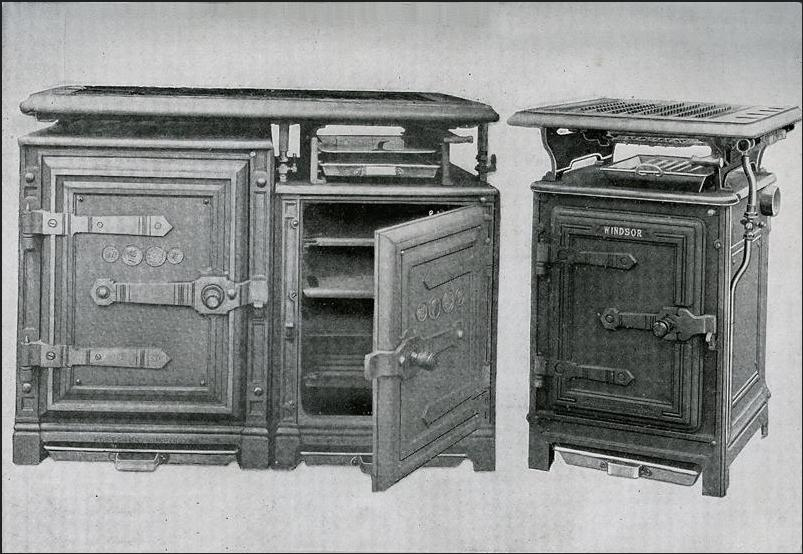
Early gas stoves produced by Windsor in Mrs Beeton's Book of Household Management, 1904

A major improvement in fuel technology came with the advent of gas. The first gas stoves were developed as early as the 1820s, but these remained isolated experiments. James Sharp patented a gas stove in Northampton, England, in 1826 and opened a gas stove factory in 1836. His invention was marketed by the firm Smith & Philips from 1828. An important figure in the early acceptance of this new technology, was Alexis Soyer, the renowned chef at the Reform Club in London. From 1841, he converted his kitchen to consume piped gas, arguing that gas was cheaper overall because the supply could be turned off when the stove was not in use.

A gas stove was shown at The Great Exhibition in London in 1851, but it was only in the 1880s that the technology became a commercial success in England. By that stage a large and reliable network for gas pipeline transport had spread over much of the country, making gas relatively cheap and efficient for domestic use. Gas stoves only became widespread on the European Continent and in the United States in the early 20th century.

=== Electric stove ===
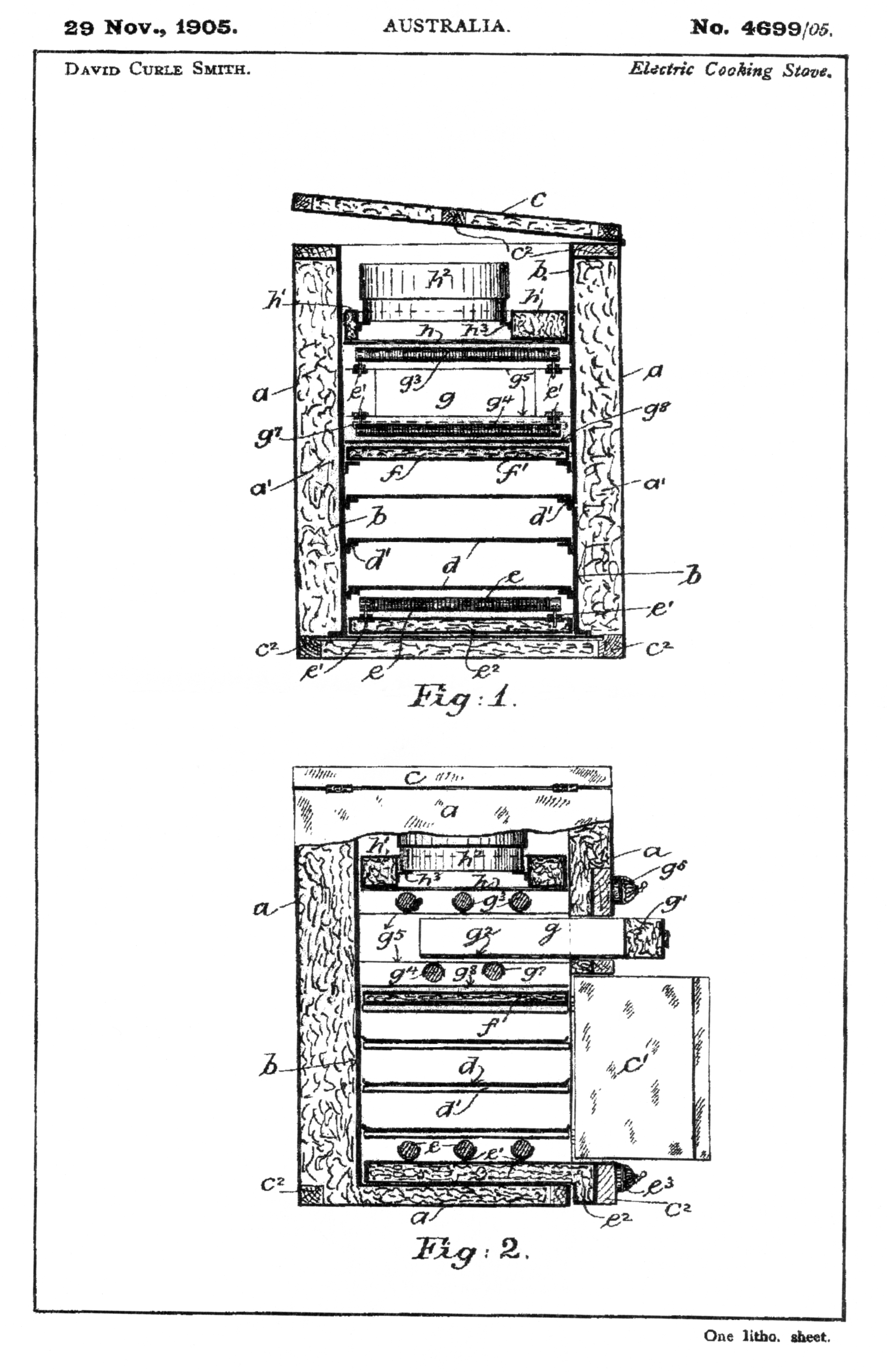
Australian patent (1905) for an "electric cooking stove", also known as "The Kalgoorlie Stove"

Once electric power was widely and economically available, electric stoves became a popular alternative to fuel-burning appliances. One of the earliest such devices was patented by Canadian inventor Thomas Ahearn in 1892. Ahearn and Warren Y. Soper were owners of Ottawa's Chaudiere Electric Light and Power Company. The electric stove was showcased at the Chicago World's Fair in 1893, where an electrified model kitchen was shown.

Unlike the gas stove, the electrical stove was slow to catch on, partly due to the unfamiliar technology, and the need for cities and towns to be electrified. Early electric stoves were unsatisfactory due to the cost of electricity (compared with wood, coal, or city gas), limited power available from the electrical supply company, poor temperature regulation, and short life of heating elements. The invention of nichrome alloy for resistance wires improved the cost and durability of heating elements.

The first practical design was patented by the Australian David Curle Smith in 1905. His device adopted (following the design of gas stoves) what later became the configuration for most electric stoves: an oven surmounted by a hotplate with a grill tray between them. Curle Smith's stove did not have a thermostat; heat was controlled by the number of the appliance's nine elements that were switched on.

The first electric stoves used heating elements made of high-resistance metal to produce heat. The stovetop (range) surface had one or more circular heating elements, insulated with compressed magnesia and sheathed in a spiral metal tube. Heating elements for the oven are of similar construction but an elongated loop to distribute heat. Elements were made as plug-in consumer-replaceable parts and could also be easily removed for cleaning. Temperature of cooking elements was regulated by adjusting a bimetal thermostat control switch, which switched power on and off to control the average heating effect of the elements.

Induction cooking uses electricity to power magnetic fields that transfer heat directly to cooking vessels. Induction stoves are highly efficient with less waste heat and provide precise controls for fast and consistent cooking.

=== Other technologies ===
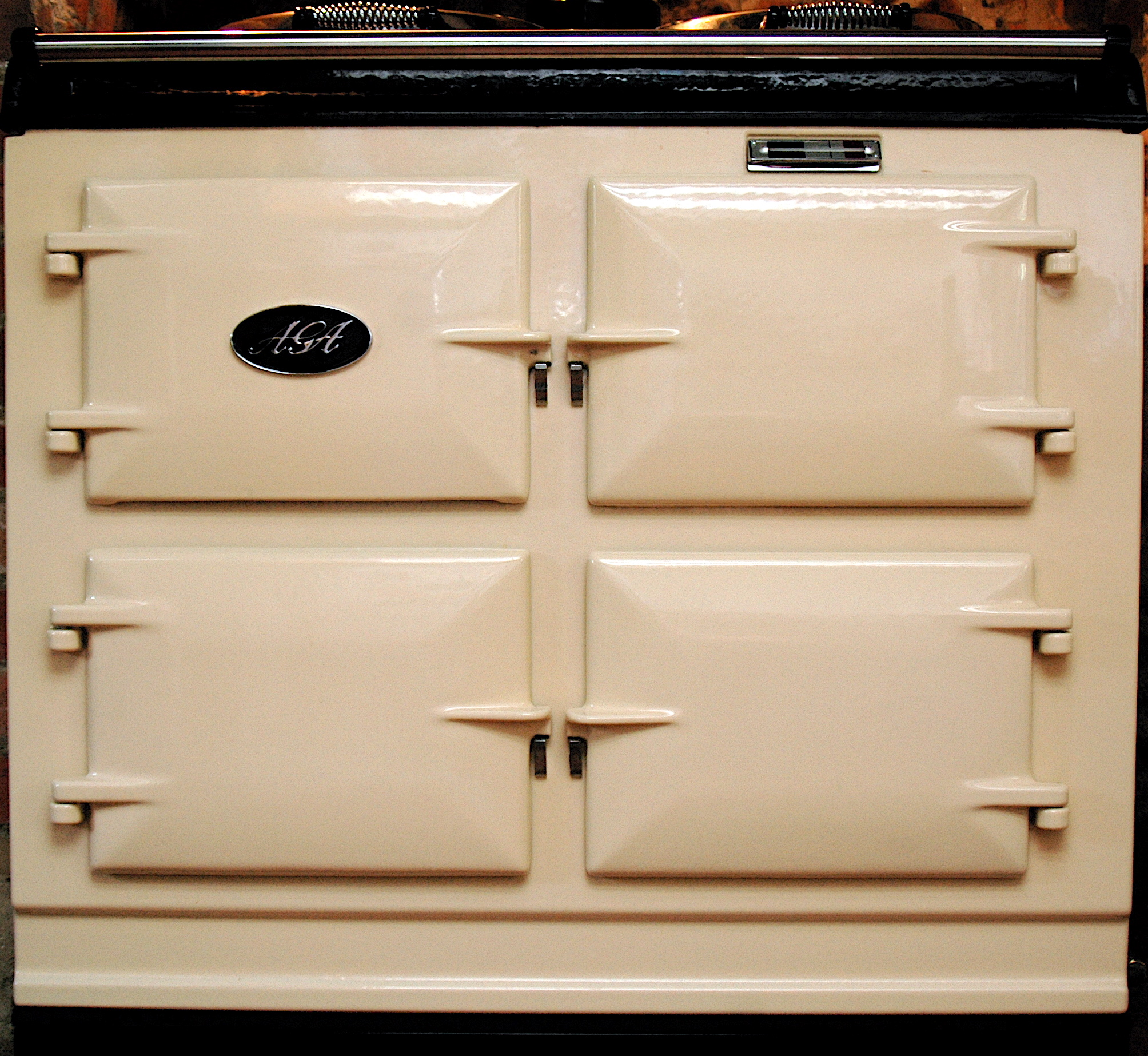
A modern three-oven AGA cooker

A high-end gas stove called the AGA cooker was invented in 1922 by Swedish Nobel prize winner Gustaf Dalén. As a heat storage stove, it worked on the principle that a heavy frame made from cast iron components can absorb heat from a relatively low-intensity but continuously burning source, and the accumulated heat can then be used when needed for cooking.

Dalén took his design to Britain in 1929, where it was first manufactured under licence in the early 1930s. The cast iron components were first cast at the Coalbrookdale foundry in the 1940s, where they are still made today by the Aga Rangemaster Group. Its popularity in certain parts of English society (owners of medium to large country houses) led to the coining of the term "Aga saga" in the 1990s, referring to a genre of fiction set amongst stereotypical upper-middle-class society.

Microwave ovens were developed in the 1940s, and use microwave radiation to directly heat the water held inside food.

== Cooktop ==
A cooktop or hob is a cooking appliance that heats the bottoms of pans or pots; it does not have an enclosed oven as used for baking or roasting. Cooktops may be heated by gas or electricity and may also have exhaust systems.

Flattop grills are also being installed into kitchen counters and islands, which do double-duty as a direct cooking surface as well as a platform for heating pots and pans. A hot plate is a similar device, which is mobile and can be used as an appropriate technology.

== See also ==
- Barbecue grill
- Beverage-can stove
- Electric stove
- Extractor hood (range hood)
- Gas stove
- Hot plate
- Improved cookstove
- Induction stove
- Integrated stove
- List of stoves
- Portable stove
- Potbelly stove
- Pressure cooker
- Primitive clay oven
- Rocket stove
- Slow cooker
- Solar cooker
