= Oven =

Enclosed chamber for heating objects

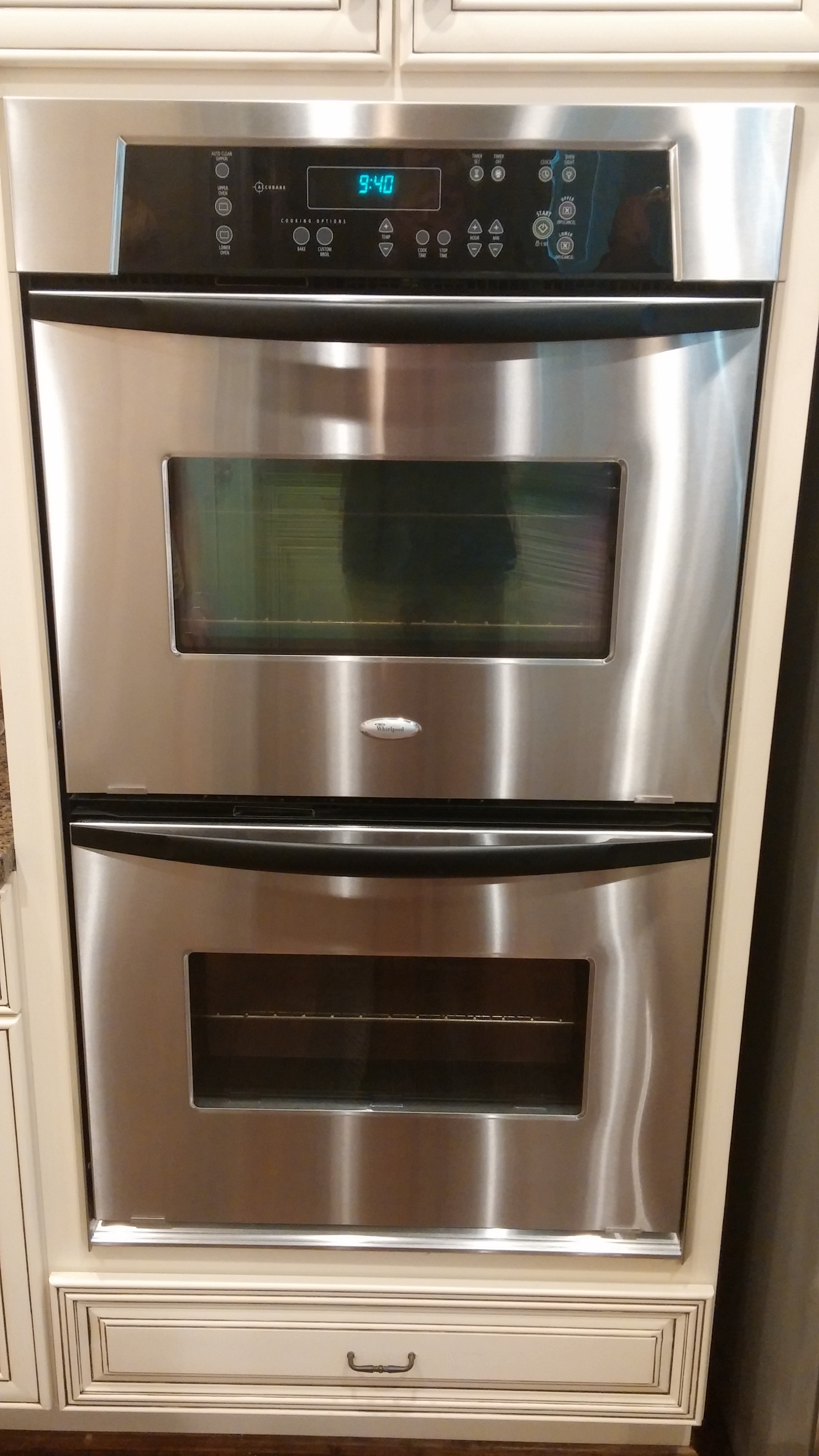
A double oven

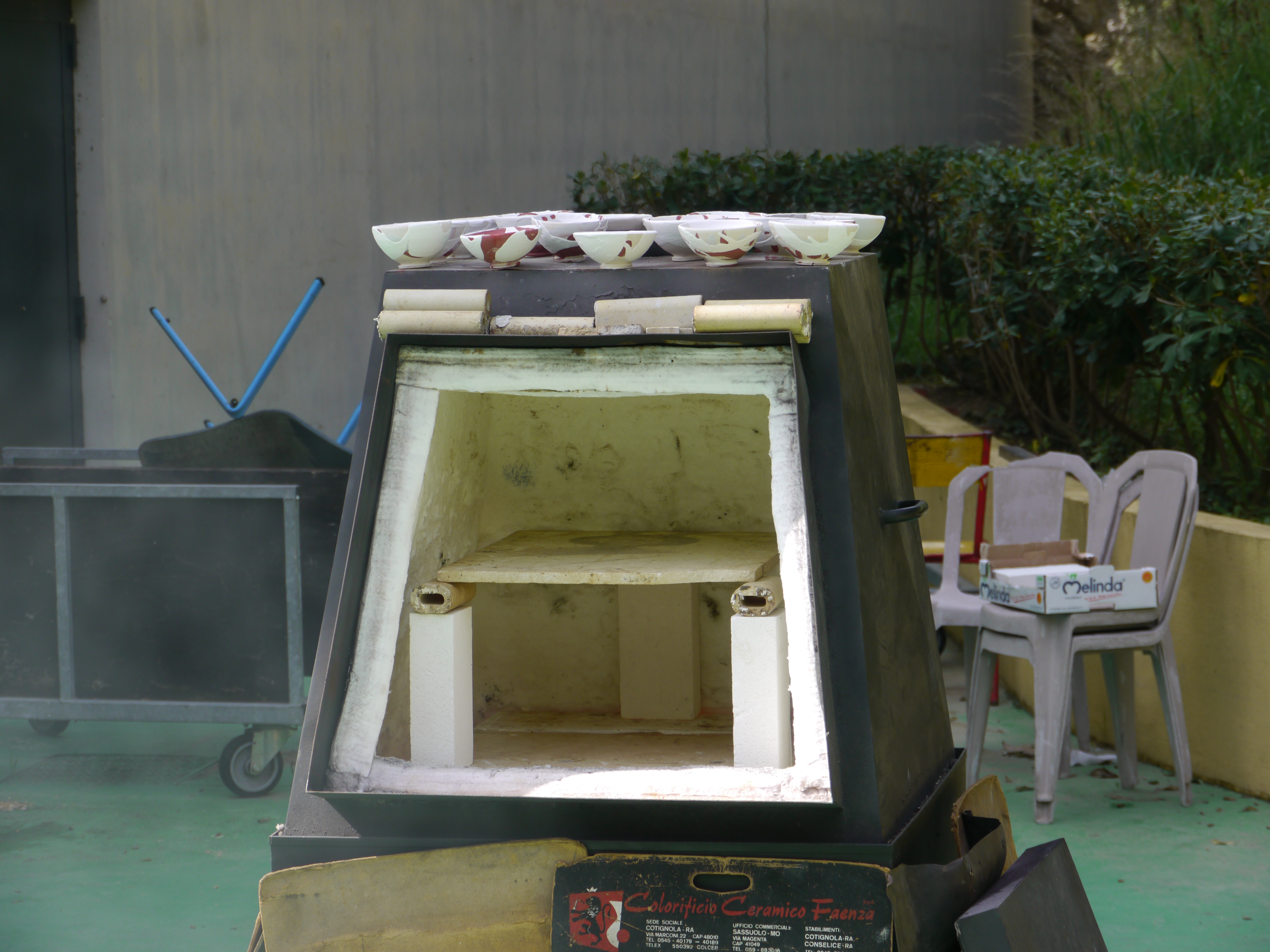
A ceramic oven

An oven is a tool that is used to expose materials to a hot environment. Ovens contain a hollow chamber and provide a means of heating the chamber in a controlled way. In use since antiquity, they have been used to accomplish a wide variety of tasks requiring controlled heating. Because they are used for a variety of purposes, there are many different types of ovens. These types differ depending on their intended purpose and based upon how they generate heat.

Ovens are often used for cooking, usually baking, sometimes broiling; they can be used to heat food to a desired temperature. Ovens are also used in the manufacturing of ceramics and pottery; these ovens are sometimes referred to as kilns. Metallurgical furnaces are ovens used in the manufacturing of metals, while glass furnaces are ovens used to produce glass.

There are many methods by which different types of ovens produce heat. Some ovens heat materials using the combustion of a fuel, such as wood, coal, or natural gas, while many employ electricity. Microwave ovens heat materials by exposing them to microwave radiation, while electric ovens and electric furnaces heat materials using resistive heating. Some ovens use forced convection, the movement of gases inside the heating chamber, to enhance the heating process, or, in some cases, to change the properties of the material being heated, such as in the Bessemer method of steel production.

== History ==
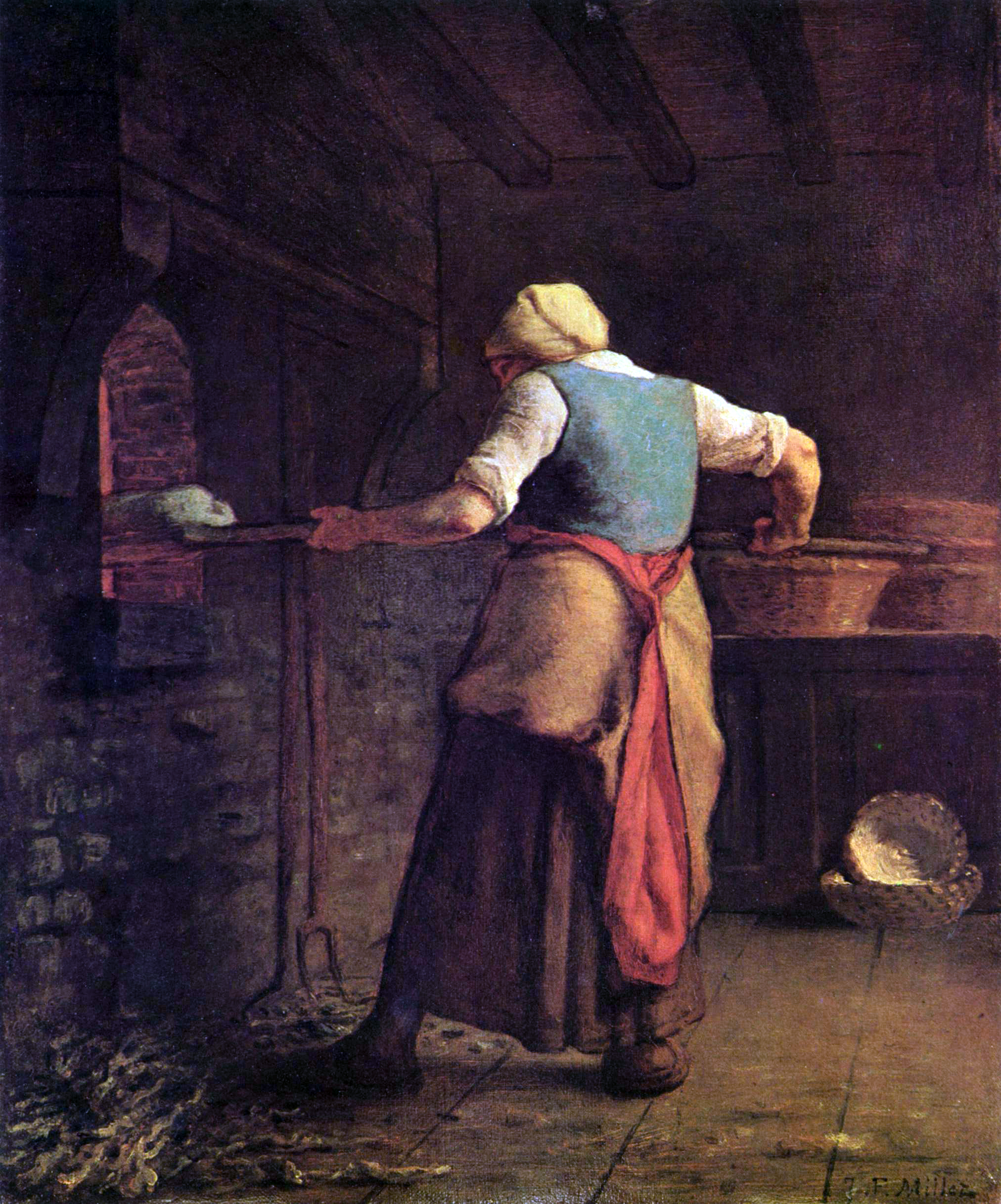
Oven depicted in Jean-François Millet's painting, Woman Baking Bread (1854)

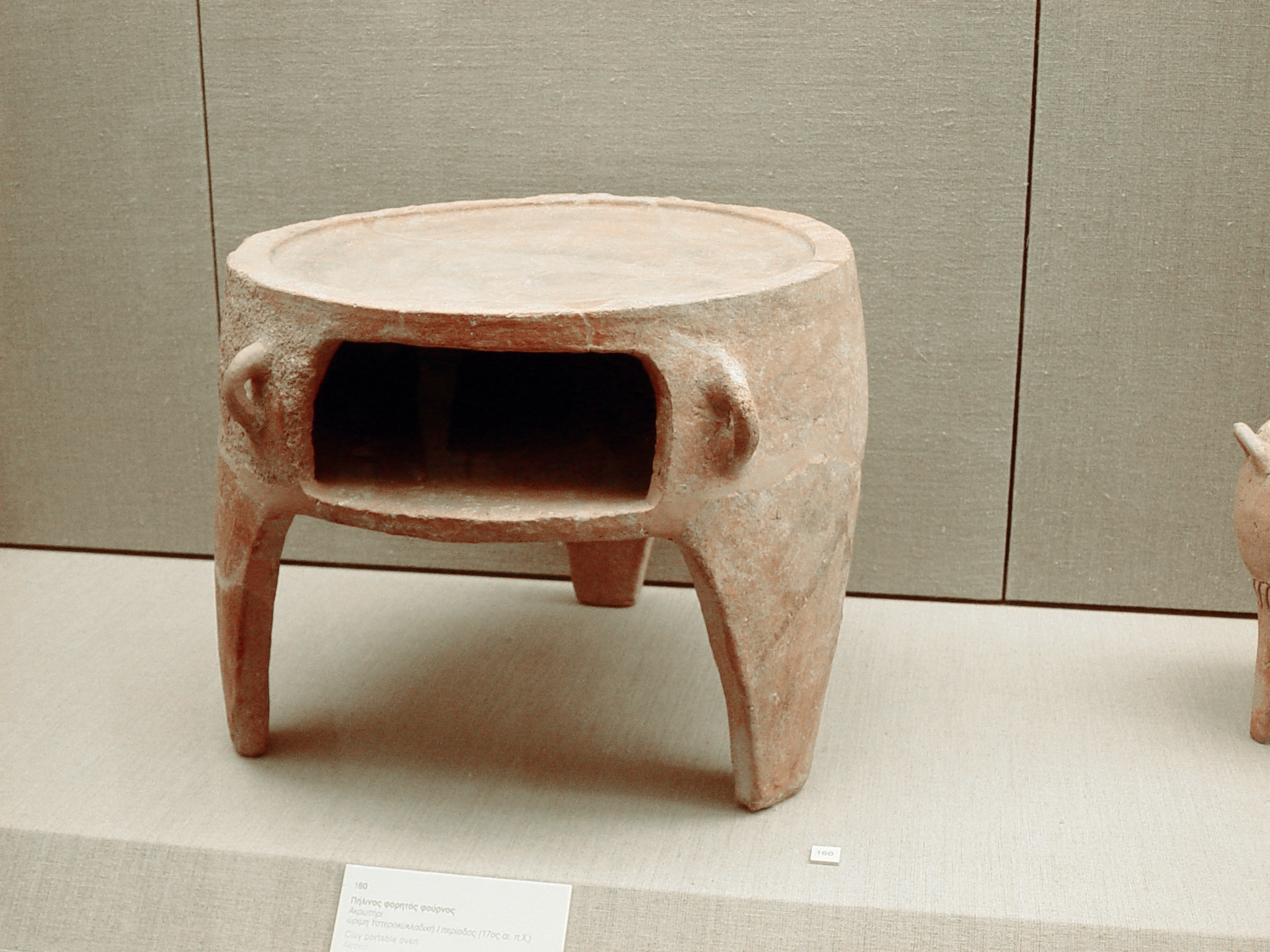
Ancient Greek portable oven, 17th century BC

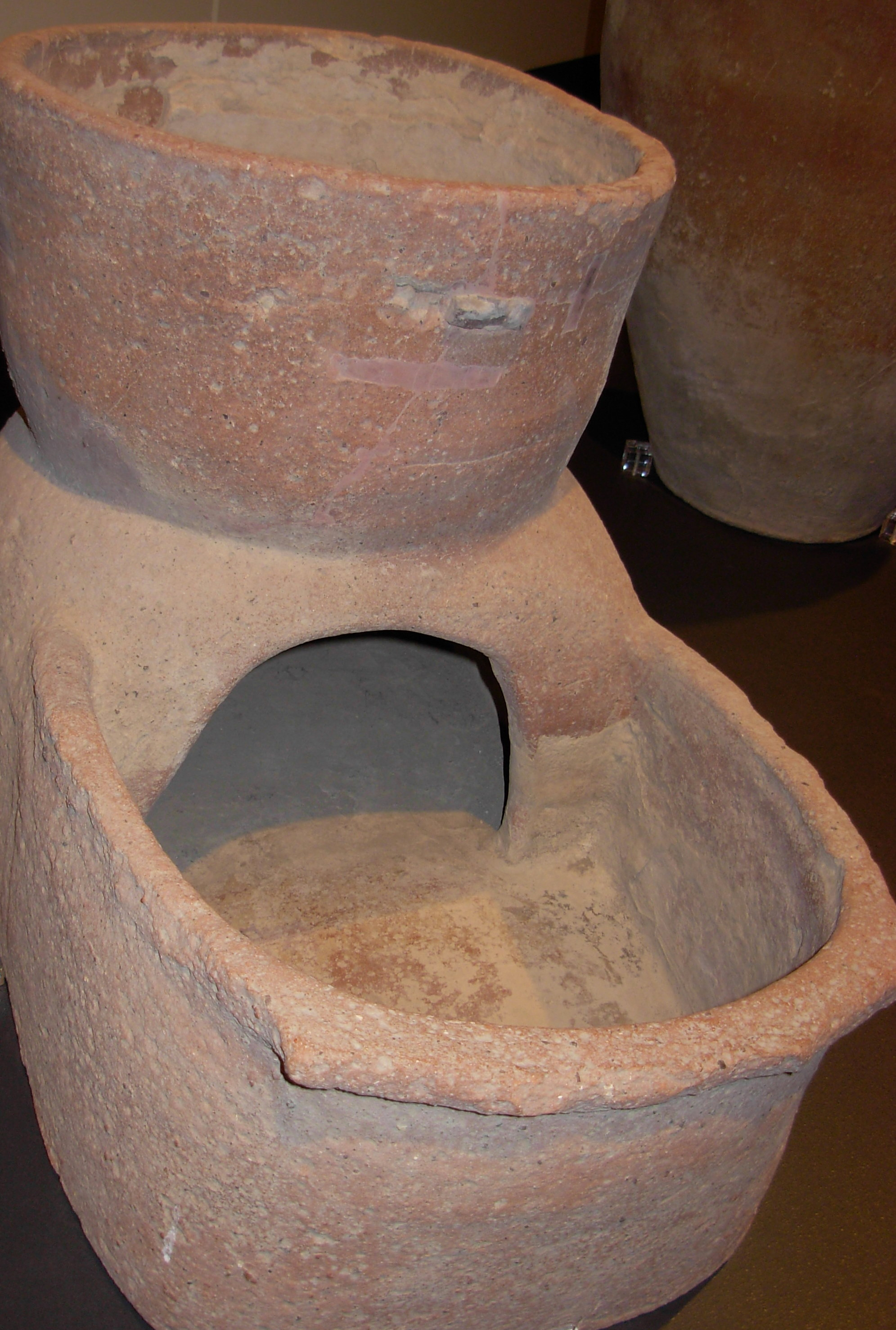
Classical Pompeii oven

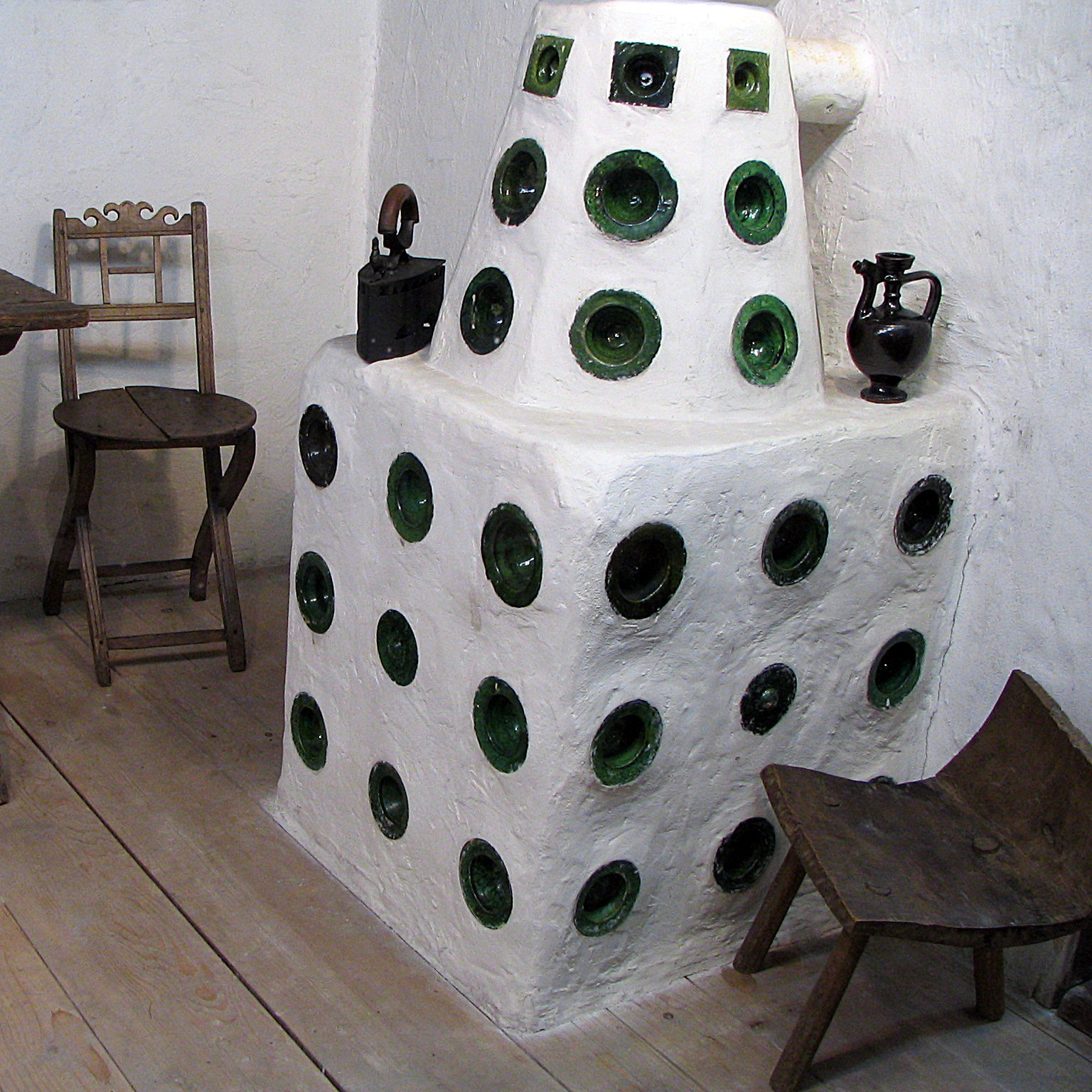
Traditional clay stove from Serbia (Ethnographic Museum, Belgrade)

The earliest ovens were found in Central Europe and date back to 29,000 BC. They were roasting and boiling pits inside yurts used to cook mammoth. In Ukraine from 20,000 BC they used pits with hot coals covered in ashes. Food was wrapped in leaves and set on top, then covered with earth. In camps found in Mezhirich, each mammoth bone house had a hearth used for heating and cooking. Clay ovens appeared in homes in Çatalhöyük, by 6600 BC. Pre-dynastic civilizations in Egypt used ovens and kilns around 5000–4000 BC to make pottery. By 4000 BC clay Ovens were in use through Mesopotamia, with examples unearthed at Ur, Nippur, and Eridu. By 3200 BC, ovens were used by cultures who lived in the Indus Valley, to cook food and to make bricks.

Tandır ovens used to bake unleavened flatbread were common in Anatolia during the Seljuk and Ottoman eras and have been found at archaeological sites distributed across the Middle East. The word tandır comes from the Akkadian tinuru, which becomes tanur in Hebrew and Arabic, and tandır in Turkish. Of the hundreds of bread varieties known from cuneiform sources, unleavened tinuru bread was made by adhering bread to the side walls of a heated cylindrical oven. This type of bread is still central to rural food culture in this part of the world, reflected by the local folklore, in which a young man and woman sharing fresh tandır bread is a symbol of young love. However, the culture of traditional bread baking is changing with younger generations, especially with those who reside in towns and prefer modern conveniences.

During the Middle Ages, instead of earth and ceramic ovens, Europeans used fireplaces in conjunction with large cauldrons. These were similar to the Dutch oven. After the Middle Ages, ovens underwent many changes over time from wood, iron, coal, gas, and even electric. Each design had its own motivation and purpose. The wood-burning stoves saw improvement through the addition of fire chambers that allowed better containment and release of smoke. Another recognizable oven would be the cast-iron stove. These were first used around the early 1700s, when they themselves underwent several variations including the Stewart Oberlin iron stove that was smaller and had its own chimney.

In the early part of the 19th century, the coal oven was developed. It was cylindrical in shape and made of heavy cast iron. The gas oven saw its first use as early as the beginning of the 19th century as well. Gas stoves became very common household ovens once gas lines were available to most houses and neighborhoods. James Sharp patented one of the first gas stoves in 1826. Other improvements to the gas stove included the AGA cooker, invented in 1922 by Gustaf Dalén. The first electric ovens were invented in the very late 19th century; however, like many electrical inventions destined for commercial use, mass ownership of electrical ovens could not be a reality until a better and more efficient use of electricity was available.

Over time, new cooking methods have been developed. The microwave as a cooking tool was discovered by Percy Spencer in 1946, and with help from engineers, the microwave oven was patented. The microwave oven uses microwave radiation to excite water molecules in food, causing friction and thus producing heat.

== Types ==
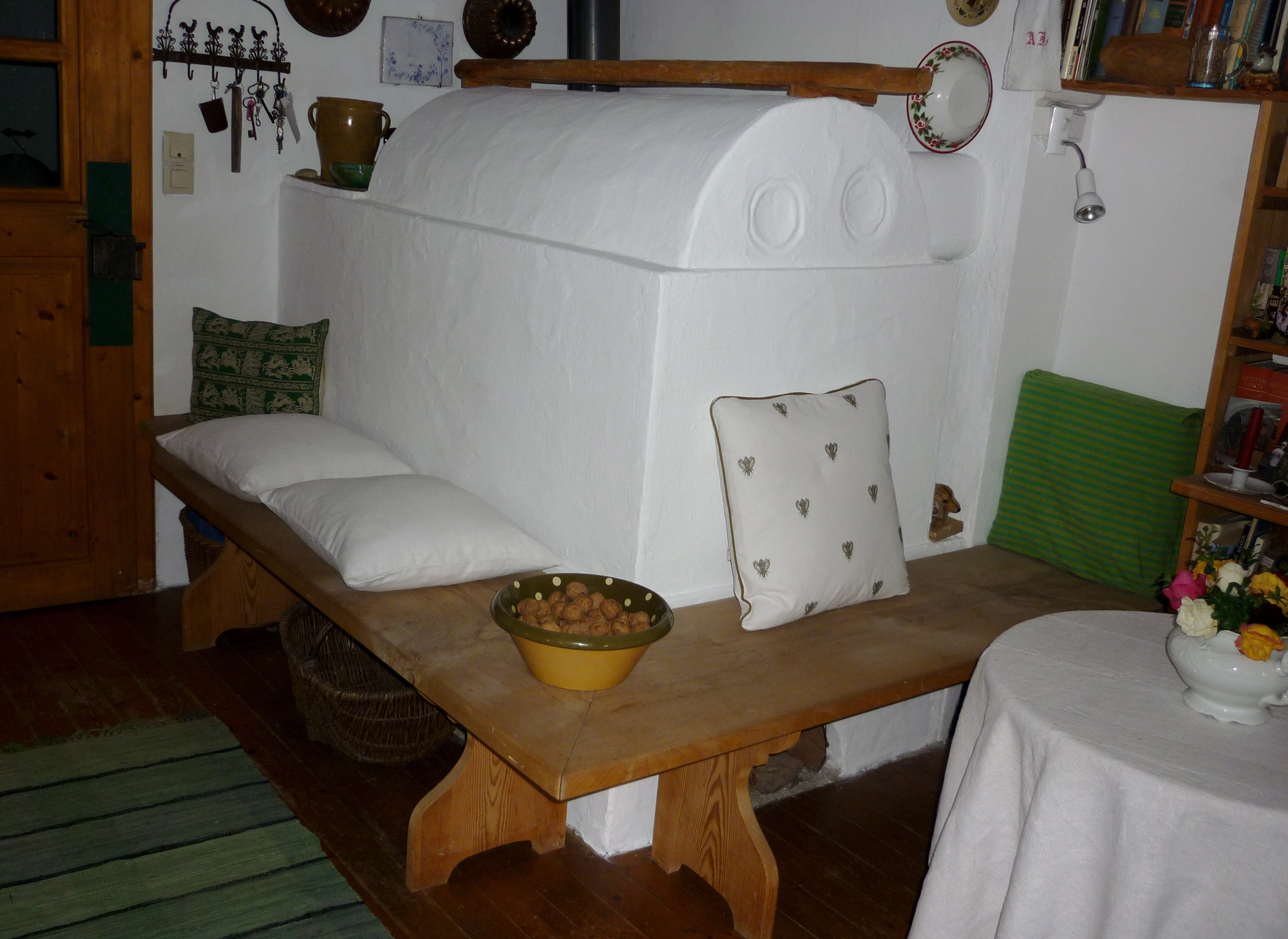
A stove bench in the living room of a German farmhouse

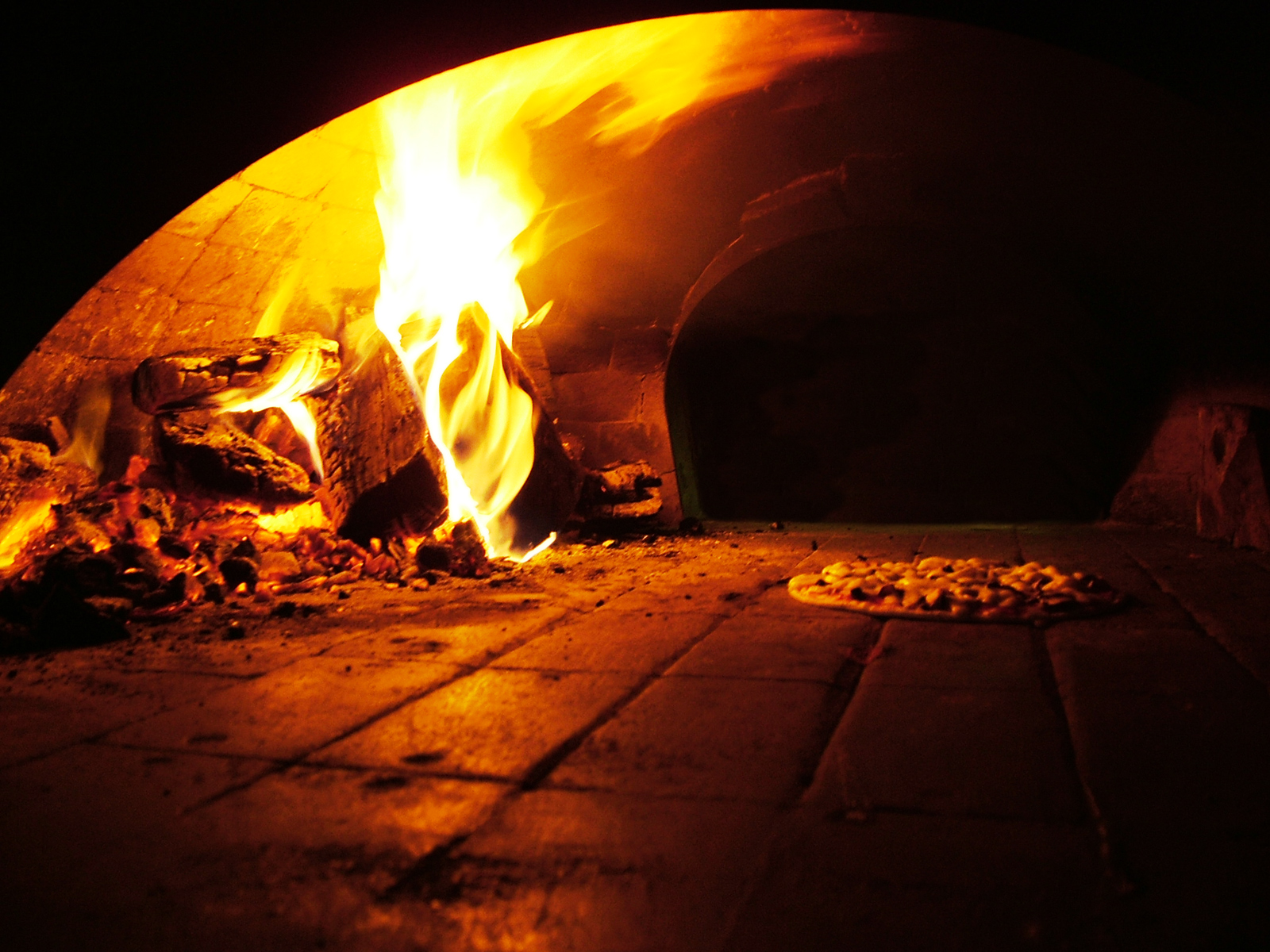
A wood-fired pizza oven, a type of masonry oven

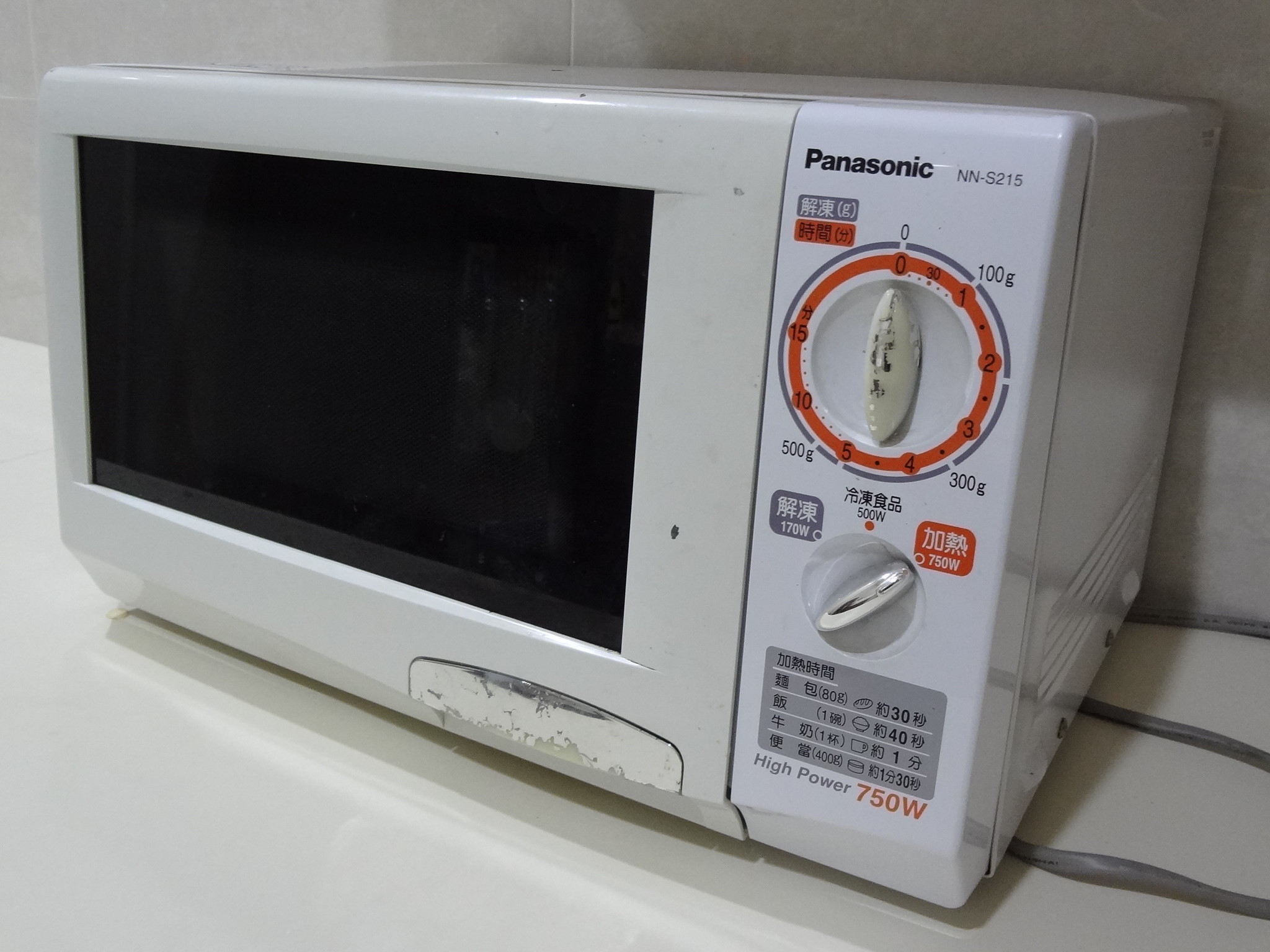
A microwave oven

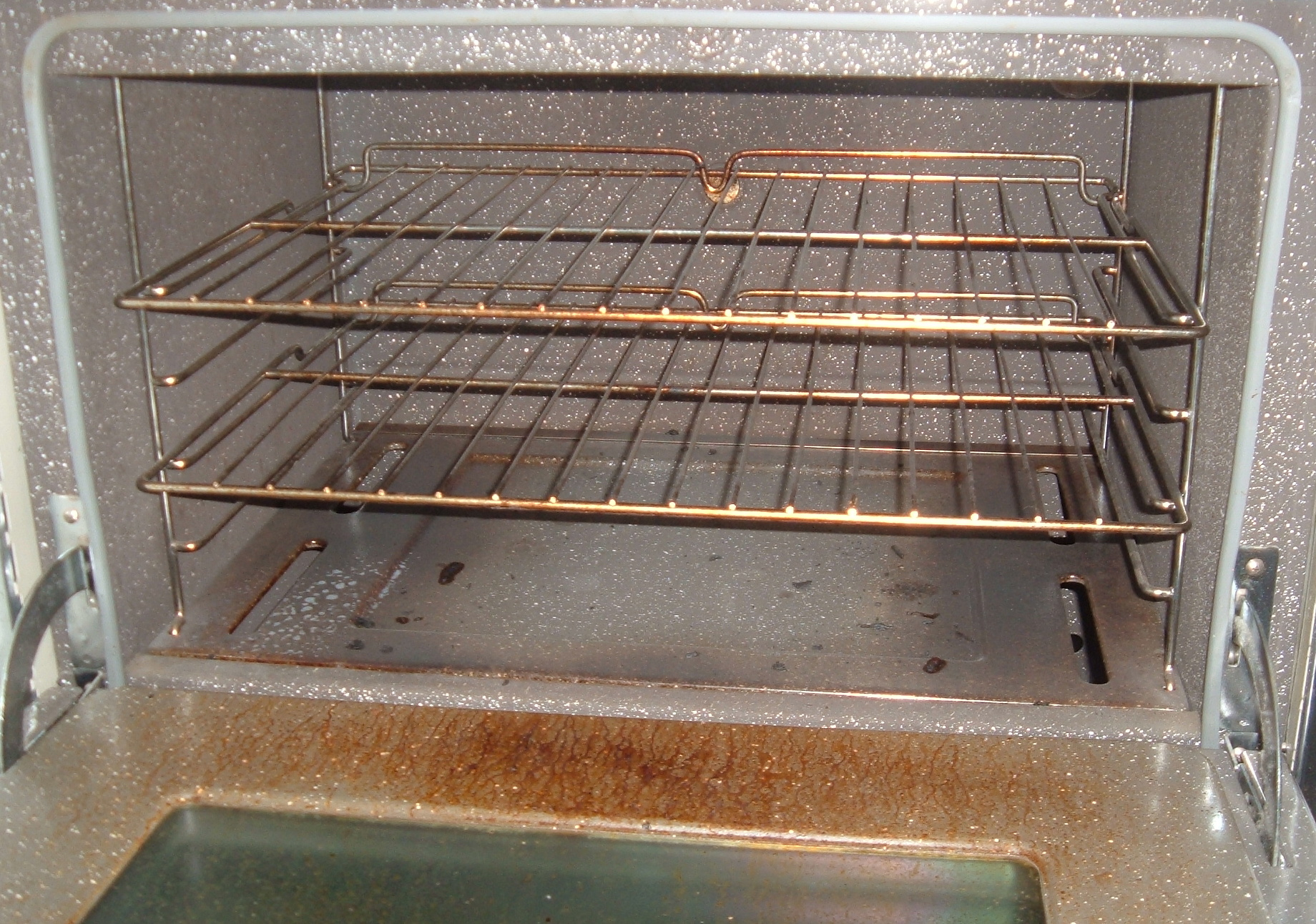
Interior of a modern home oven

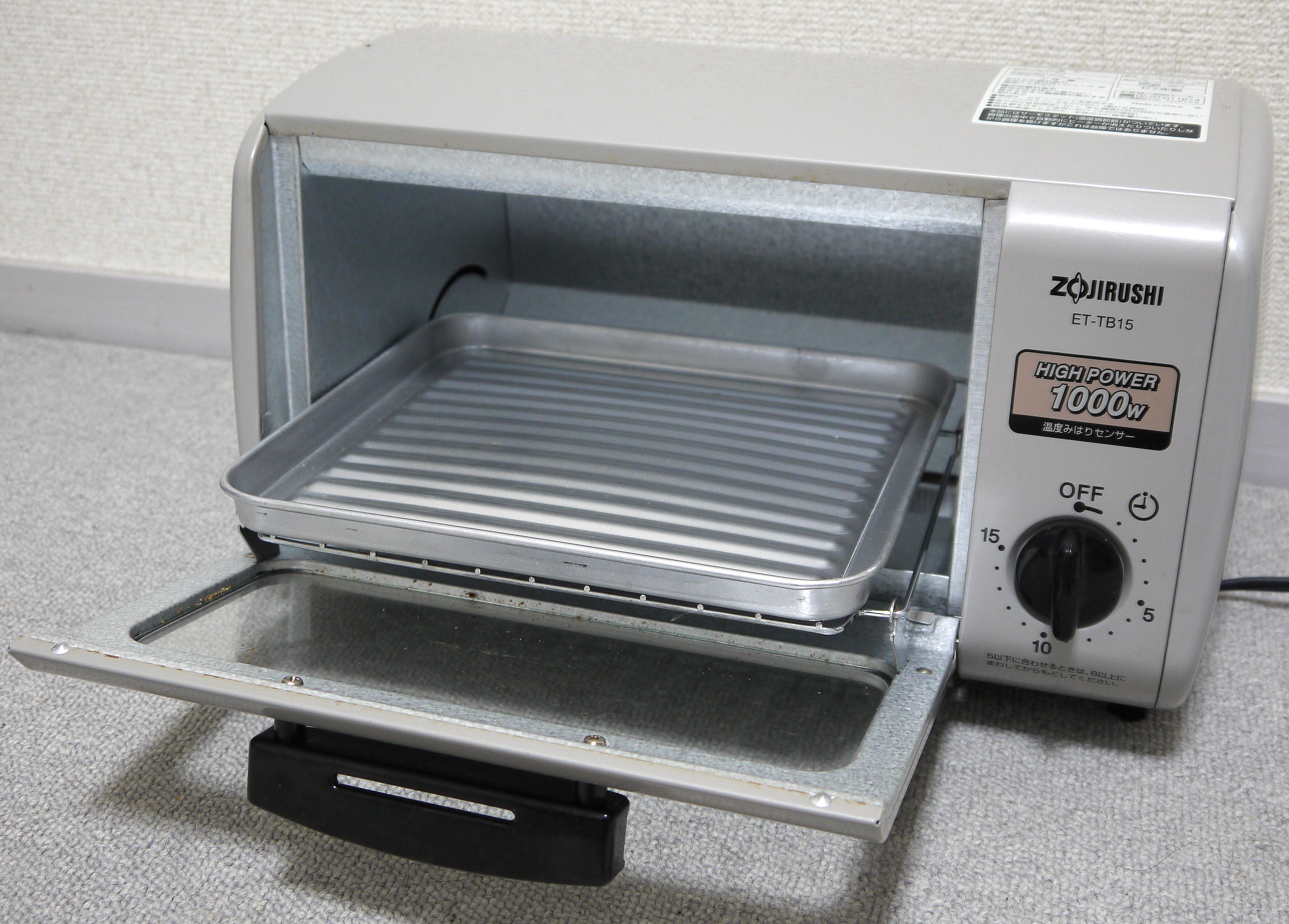
A Japanese toaster oven

Double oven
A built-in oven fixture that has either two ovens, or one oven and one microwave oven. It is usually built into the kitchen cabinet.
Earth oven
An earth oven is a pit dug into the ground and then heated, usually by rocks or smoldering debris. Historically these have been used by many cultures for cooking. Cooking times are usually long, and the process is usually cooking by slow roasting the food. Earth ovens are among the most common things archaeologists look for at an anthropological dig, as they are one of the key indicators of human civilization and static society.
Ceramic oven
The ceramic oven is an oven constructed of clay or any other ceramic material and takes different forms depending on the culture. Widely used in pre-Dynastic Egypt, Çatalhöyük, and Mesopotamia, c.6600 BC. South Asians refer to them as a tandoor, and have used them from the Indus Valley Civilisation. Brick ovens are also another ceramic type oven. A culture most notable for the use of brick ovens is Italy and its intimate history with pizza. However, its history also dates further back to Roman times, wherein the brick oven was used not only for commercial use but household use as well.
Gas oven
One of the first recorded uses of a gas stove and oven referenced a dinner party in 1802 hosted by Zachaus Winzler, where all the food was prepared either on a gas stove or in its oven compartment. In 1834, British inventor James Sharp began to commercially produce gas ovens after installing one in his own house. In 1851, the Bower's Registered Gas Stove was displayed at the Great Exhibition. This stove would set the standard and basis for the modern gas oven. Notable improvements to the gas stove since include the addition of the thermostat which assisted in temperature regulation; also an enamel coating was added to the production of gas stoves and ovens in order to help with easier cleaning.
Electric oven
These produce their heat electrically, often via resistive heating.
Toaster oven
Toaster ovens are small electric ovens with a front door, wire rack and removable baking pan. To toast bread with a toaster oven, slices of bread are placed horizontally on the rack. When the toast is done, the toaster turns off, but in most cases the door must be opened manually. Most toaster ovens are significantly larger than toasters, but are capable of performing most of the functions of electric ovens, albeit on a much smaller scale.
Masonry oven
Masonry ovens consist of a baking chamber made of fireproof brick, concrete, stone, or clay. Though traditionally wood-fired, coal-fired ovens were common in the 19th century. Modern masonry ovens are often fired with natural gas or even electricity, and are closely associated with artisanal bread and pizza. In the past, however, they were also used for any cooking task that required baking.
Microwave oven
An oven that cooks food using microwave radiation rather than infrared radiation (typically a fire source). Conceptualized in 1946, Dr. Percy Spencer allegedly discovered the heating properties of microwaves while studying the magnetron. By 1947, the first commercial microwave was in use in Boston, Massachusetts.
Wall oven
Wall ovens make it easier to work with large roasting pans and Dutch ovens. Mounted at waist or eye level, a wall oven eliminates bending. However, it can be nested under a countertop to save space.
Steam oven
An oven that cooks food using steam to provide heat.

Some ovens can perform in multiple ways, sometimes at once. Combination ovens may be able to microwave and conventional heating such as baking or grilling simultaneously.

== Uses ==
=== Cooking ===
Ovens are used as kitchen appliances for roasting and heating. Foods normally cooked in this manner include meat, casseroles and baked goods such as bread, cake and other desserts. In modern times, the oven is used to cook and heat food in many households around the globe.

Modern ovens are typically fueled by either natural gas or electricity, with bottle gas models available but not common. When an oven is contained in a complete stove, the fuel used for the oven may be the same as or different from the fuel used for the burners on top of the stove.

Ovens usually can use a variety of methods to cook. The most common may be to heat the oven from below. This is commonly used for baking and roasting. The oven may also be able to heat from the top to provide broiling (US) or grilling (UK/Commonwealth). A fan-assisted oven that uses a small fan to circulate the air in the cooking chamber, can be used. Both are also known as convection ovens. An oven may also provide an integrated rotisserie.

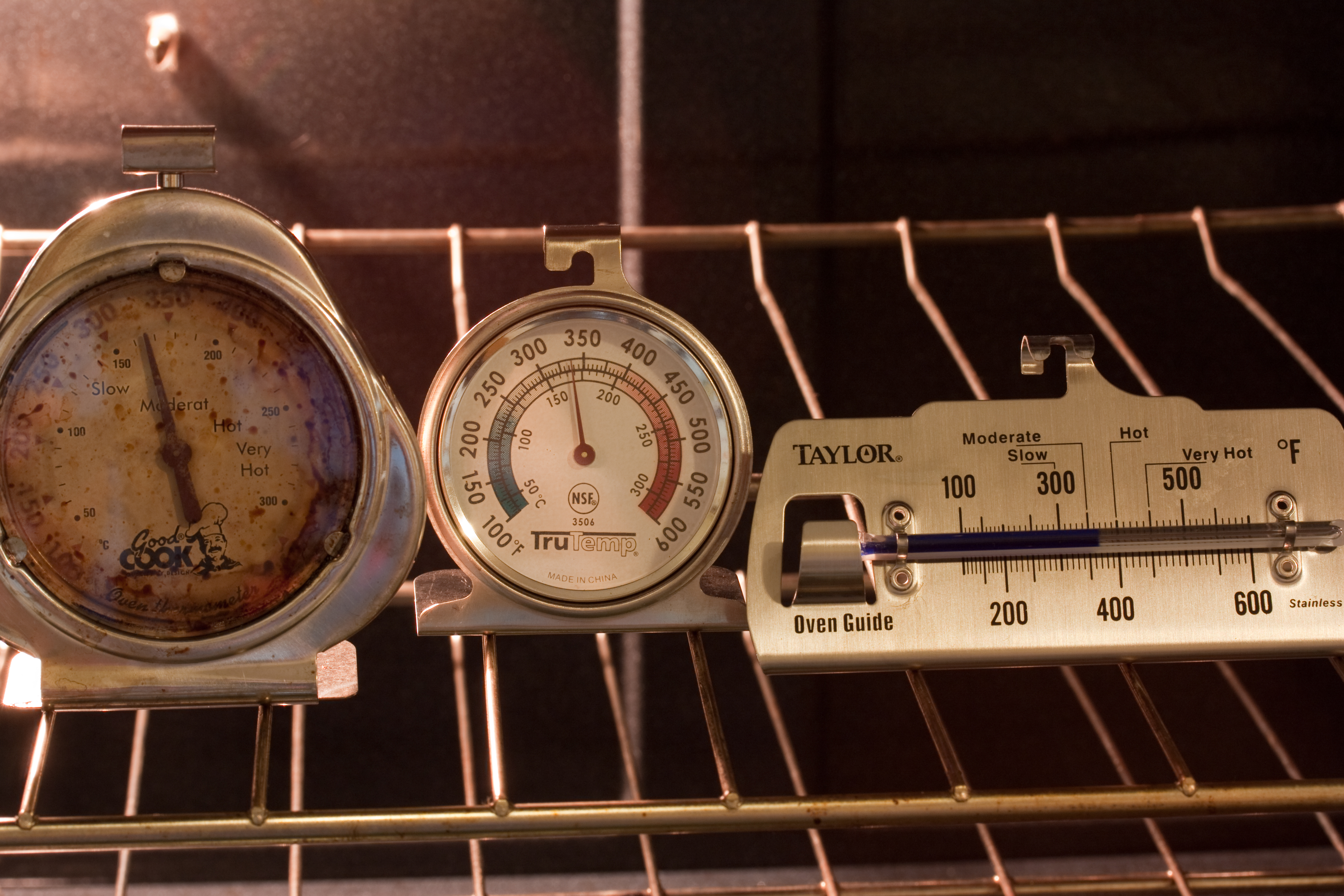
Oven Thermometers are used to ensure the heat within the oven matches the temperature on the thermometer.

Ovens also vary in the way that they are controlled. The simplest ovens (for example, the AGA cooker) may not have any controls at all; the ovens simply run continuously at various temperatures. More conventional ovens have a simple thermostat which turns the oven on and off and selects the temperature at which it will operate. Set to the highest setting, this may also enable the broiler element. A timer may allow the oven to be turned on and off automatically at pre-set times. More sophisticated ovens may have complex, computer-based controls allowing a wide variety of operating modes and special features including the use of a temperature probe to automatically shut the oven off when the food is completely cooked to the desired degree.

Toaster ovens are essentially small-scale ovens and can be used to cook foods other than just toasting. A frontal door is opened, horizontally-oriented bread slices (or other food items) are placed on a rack that has heat elements above and below it, and the door is closed. The controls are set and actuated to toast the bread to the desired doneness, whereupon the heat elements are switched off. In most cases, the door must be opened manually, though there are also toaster ovens with doors that open automatically. Because the bread is horizontal, a toaster oven can be used to cook toast with toppings, like garlic bread, melt sandwiches, or toasted cheese. Toaster ovens are generally slower to make toast than pop-up toasters, taking 4–6 minutes as compared to 2–3 minutes. In addition to the automatic-toasting settings, toaster ovens typically have settings and temperature controls to allow use of the appliance as a small oven.

Extra features on toaster ovens can include:

- Heating element control options, such as a "top brown" setting that powers only the upper elements so food can be broiled without heat from below.
- Multiple shelf racks – Having options for positioning the oven shelf gives more control over the distance between food and the heating element.

=== Industrial, scientific, and artisanal ===
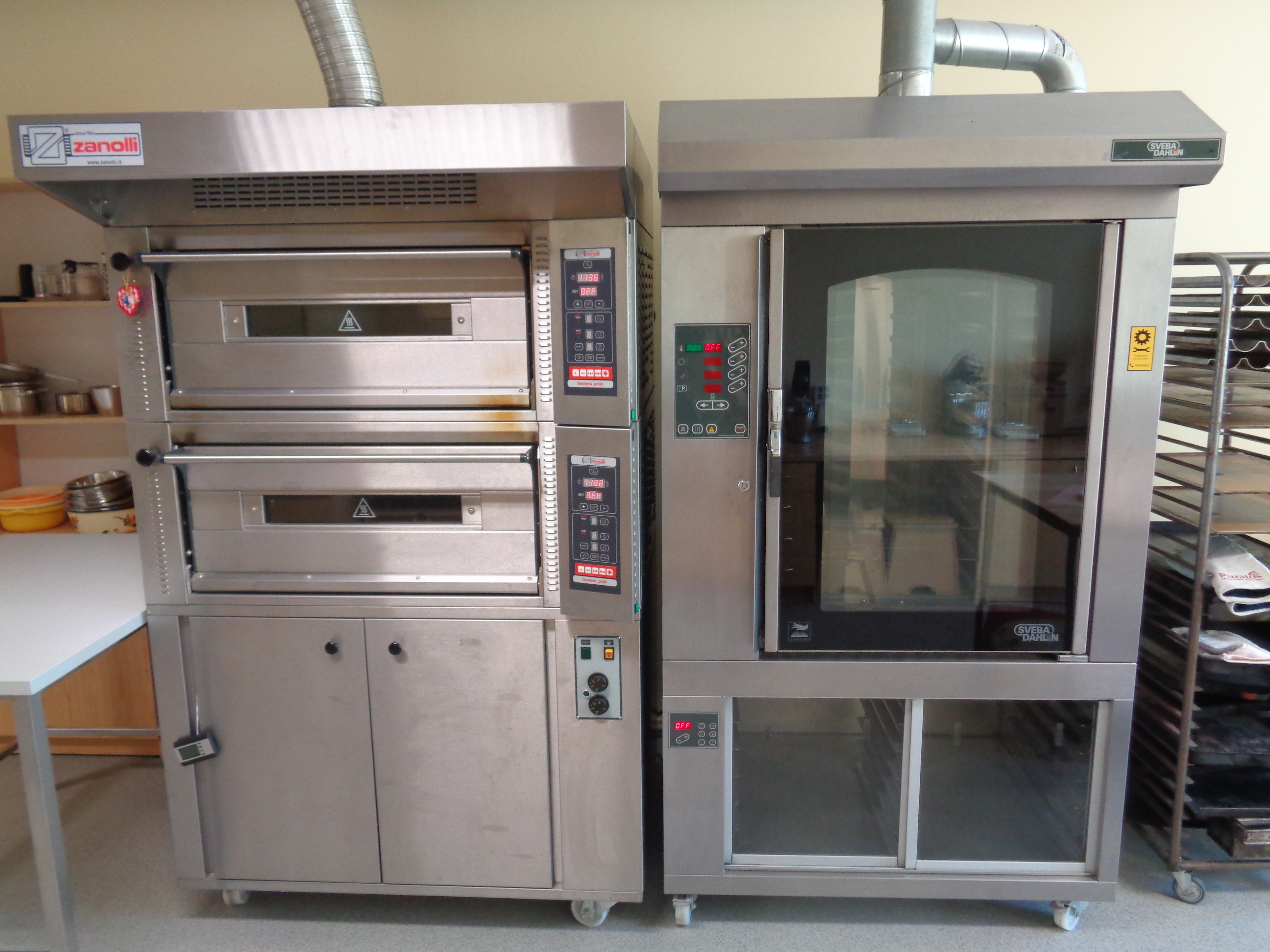
Industrial Zanolli double hearth deck oven (left) and Sveba-Dahlen rotary rack oven (right)

Outside the culinary world, ovens are used for a number of purposes:

- A furnace can be used either to provide heat to a building or used to melt substances such as glass or metal for further processing. A blast furnace is a particular type of furnace generally associated with metal smelting (particularly steel manufacture) using refined coke or similar hot-burning substance as a fuel, with air pumped in under pressure to increase the temperature of the fire. A blacksmith uses a temporarily blown furnace, the smith's heart to heat iron to a glowing red to yellow temperature.
- A kiln is a high-temperature oven used in wood drying, ceramics and cement manufacturing to convert mineral feedstock (in the form of clay or calcium or aluminum rocks) into a glassier, more solid form. In the case of ceramic kilns, a shaped clay object is the final result, while cement kilns produce a substance called clinker that is crushed to make the final cement product. (Certain types of drying ovens used in food manufacture, especially those used in malting, are also referred to as kilns.)
- An autoclave is an oven-like device with features similar to a pressure cooker that allows the heating of aqueous solutions to higher temperatures than water's boiling point in order to sterilize the contents of the autoclave.
- Industrial ovens are similar to their culinary equivalents and are used for a number of different applications that do not require the high temperatures of a kiln or furnace.

== See also ==
- Beehive oven
- Clome oven
- Convection microwave
- Cook stove
- Egyptian egg oven
- Fridge
- Gas Mark
- Horno
- Kitchen cabinetry cut-outs
- Kitchen stove
- List of cooking appliances
- Oven glove
- Reflector oven
- Russian oven
- Self-cleaning oven
- Solar oven
- Tandoor
- Trivection oven

== Sources ==
- Bauhoff, Gunter. "History of Cast-Iron Oven Plate". Offa Bd. 40: 1983. 191–197.
- Bellis, Mary. "History of the Oven from Cast Iron to Electric".
- Curtis, Roger. "Peruvian or Polynesian: The Stone-Lined Earth Oven of Easter Island." New Zealand Archaeological Association Newsletter. 22, no. 3: 1979. 92–96.
- Gallawa, Carlton J. "How do Microwaves Cook";.
- National Academy of Engineers. "Household Appliances-Cooking".
- Roper, Frances. Chilean Baking-Oven. Antiquity Publications. Great Britain: 1937. 355–356.
- Silltoe, Paul. "The Earth Oven: An Alternative to the Barbecue from the Highlands of Papua New Guinea". The Anthropologists' Cook Book: 1997. 224–231.
- Sopoliga, Miroslav. "Oven and Hearth in Ukrainian Dwellings of Eastern Slovakia". Acta Ethnografica Academiae Scientiarium Hungaricae. Budapest: 1982. 315–355
