= Gustaf von Heidenstam =

Swedish engineer

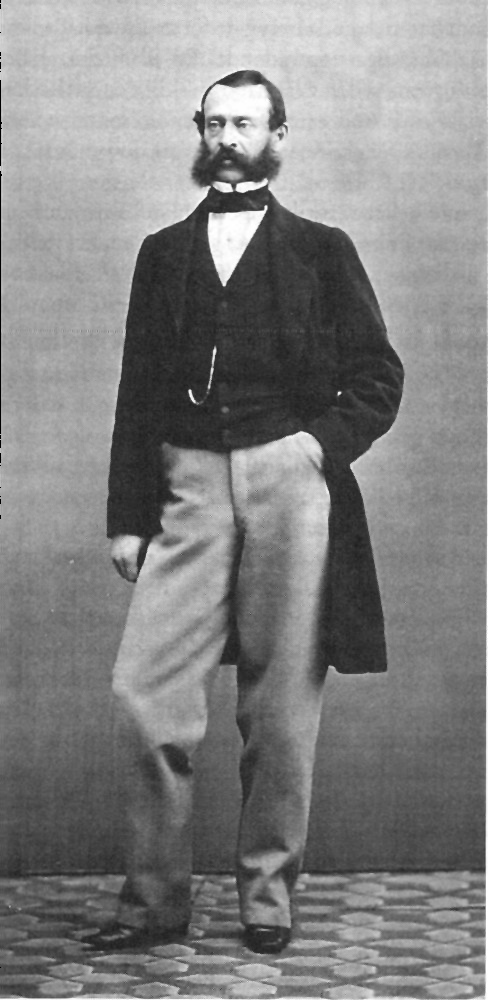
- Born: June 2, 1822; Sörby, Ronneby Municipality, Blekinge
- Died: June 2, 1887 (aged 65); Hedvig Eleonora Parish, Stockholm
- Education: Lund University
- Known for: Lighthouse design
- Spouse: Magdalena Charlotta Rütterskiöld
- Children: Verner von Heidenstam

Nils Gustav von Heidenstam (2 June 1822 – 2 June 1887) was a Swedish engineer born in the small village of Sörby, located in Ronneby Municipality, Blekinge County. He was a lighthouse designer and served as the chief engineer of the Swedish Royal Coast Guard.

== Early life ==
Gustav von Heidenstam was born in Sörby, a small village located in Ronneby Municipality, Blekinge County, to the von Heidenstam family, a Swedish noble family originating from Heide in Dithmarschen district in Schleswig-Holstein in Germany. He was the son of Werther Werner von Heidenstam and Charlotta Elisabet von Heidenstam (née Fischerström) and was sixth of their seven children.

== Military career ==
Heidenstam began his military career as a 14-year-old applying for work to the naval information office in Karlskrona in 1836. He was assigned to be an extra cadet on the brig HMS Harmonium in the same year. He graduated as an artillery non-commissioned officer in the Navy in April 1837. He became a sub-conductor in the engineering corps in the summer of 1840 and served at the Karlsborg fortress. The following year, he graduated from Lund University and became a second lieutenant in June 1842.

In 1848, Heidenstam made calculations, maps and proposals for the expansion of the entrance to Ronneby harbour. In 1849, he was employed as an engineer for the lighthouses and beacons department of The Royal Swedish Pilotage Agency. The first lighthouse he was responsible for was at Grimskär near Kalmar in 1851. He was promoted to a lieutenant in 1852 and later to a captain in 1854. Heidenstam was commissioned by the Pilotage Agency to present a fully developed lighthouse system around the coasts of Sweden, for which he presented a proposal in 1856. Two years later, he was appointed chief engineer at the agency. In the naval mechanical corps, he became a major in 1863 and a lieutenant colonel in 1875.

From the early 1860s he lived with his family in Marstrand during the summer months, where he oversaw the construction of Måseskär, Väderöbod and Pater Noster Lightouses. In addition to a number of lighthouses in Sweden, he also designed and led the work on the Bogskär Lighthouse, located on the Bogskär skerries of Åland in Finland, which was completed in 1882.

== Works ==
The Heidenstam lighthouse or Heidenstammaren is a type of lighthouse where an iron tower is erected that is braced by pipes that are further braced by steel beams and wires. Inside the iron tower there is a spiral staircase for easy access to the lantern and the plumb line, which was required to drive the lens of the lighthouse lamp via internal gears before the electrification of lighthouses and was pulled one or more times per day. The idea was to have a lighthouse that could be built quickly, with light construction materials which would be easy to transport and erect on hard-to-reach islands and islets. In addition, the lighthouse is easy to take down so that it can be relocated if necessary.

About ten lighthouses were built of this design, two of which were at Sandhammaren in 1862. One of these was moved to Pite-Rönnskär, Norrland in 1892 and is Sweden's tallest Heidenstammar with a height of 37 meters. Several of the Heidenstammar lighthouses have been replaced with new buildings after 1970, for example Väderöbod from 1867. Eight of the Heidenstammar lighthouses have become state monuments in Sweden, with the first of such a lighthouse receiving this distinction in 1935 and another receiving it most recently in 2017.

Many of von Heidenstam's works include:-

- Lighthouse at Grimskär outside Kalmar (1851).
- Lighthouse at Hjortens udde (1852) on western Lake Vänern. (declared a state monument in 2017)
- Two lighthouses on Gotska Sandön (1858–1859). (declared state monuments in 1935)
- Two lighthouses at Sandhammaren (1862) at Ystad. (declared state monuments in 1978)
- Lighthouse at Häradskär (1863) southeast of Valdemarsvik.
- Måseskär lighthouse (1865) west of Orust, Bohuslän. (declared a state monument in 2017)
- Väderöbod lighthouse (1867) located in the southern part of Väderöarna archipelago.
- Pater Noster Lighthouse (1868) outside Marstrand. (declared a state monument in 2015)
- Utklippan lighthouse (1870) outside Karlskrona. (declared a state monument in 1935)
- Kapelludden Lighthouse (1872) on Öland. (declared a state monument in 1978)
- Svenska Högarna lighthouse (1874) in Stockholm's northern archipelago.
- Bogskär Lighthouse (1882) in the southeastern archipelago of Åland.

== Personal Life and Death ==
He had an elder sister, Amalia Charlotta, four elder brothers, namely: Carl Verner, Johan Fredrik, Gerhard Fabian, Peter Adolf and Claes Ebbe Ernst, his younger brother. Carl, Johan, Gerhard, Fabian and Claes were all part of the Swedish Military, with Claes also having perished in the wrecking of the corvette Karlskrona in Florida Bay in 1846. Amalia worked in a convent and remained umarried for the rest of her life

He married Magdalena Charlotta Rütterskiöld (1837–1917), the daughter of Carl Rütterskiöld and Didrika Beata Sofia "Bibi" von Vegesack, on 25 September 1857. They had their son, Verner von Heidenstam, in 1859, who went on to become an acclaimed Swedish poet, novelist and laureate of the 1916 Nobel Prize in Literature.

Heidenstam was troubled with kidney problems during much of the latter years of his life. After taking a long sick leave due to the same, Heidenstam committed suicide on his 65th birthday in the Hedvig Eleonora parish in Stockholm. He was cremated at Hagalund crematorium on 15 October 1887.

== Awards and honors ==
- Order of Vasa, 3 May 1865
- Royal Academy of Military Sciences, 1870
- Order of the Polar Star, 1 December 1881
- Order of Saint Anne, 1882
- The Bogskär Medal, 1884
- Order of Saint Olav, 1885
- Order of Saint Stanislaus
