= Grimskär =

Swedish island in the Kalmar Strait

Coordinates: 56°39′07″N 16°22′12″E

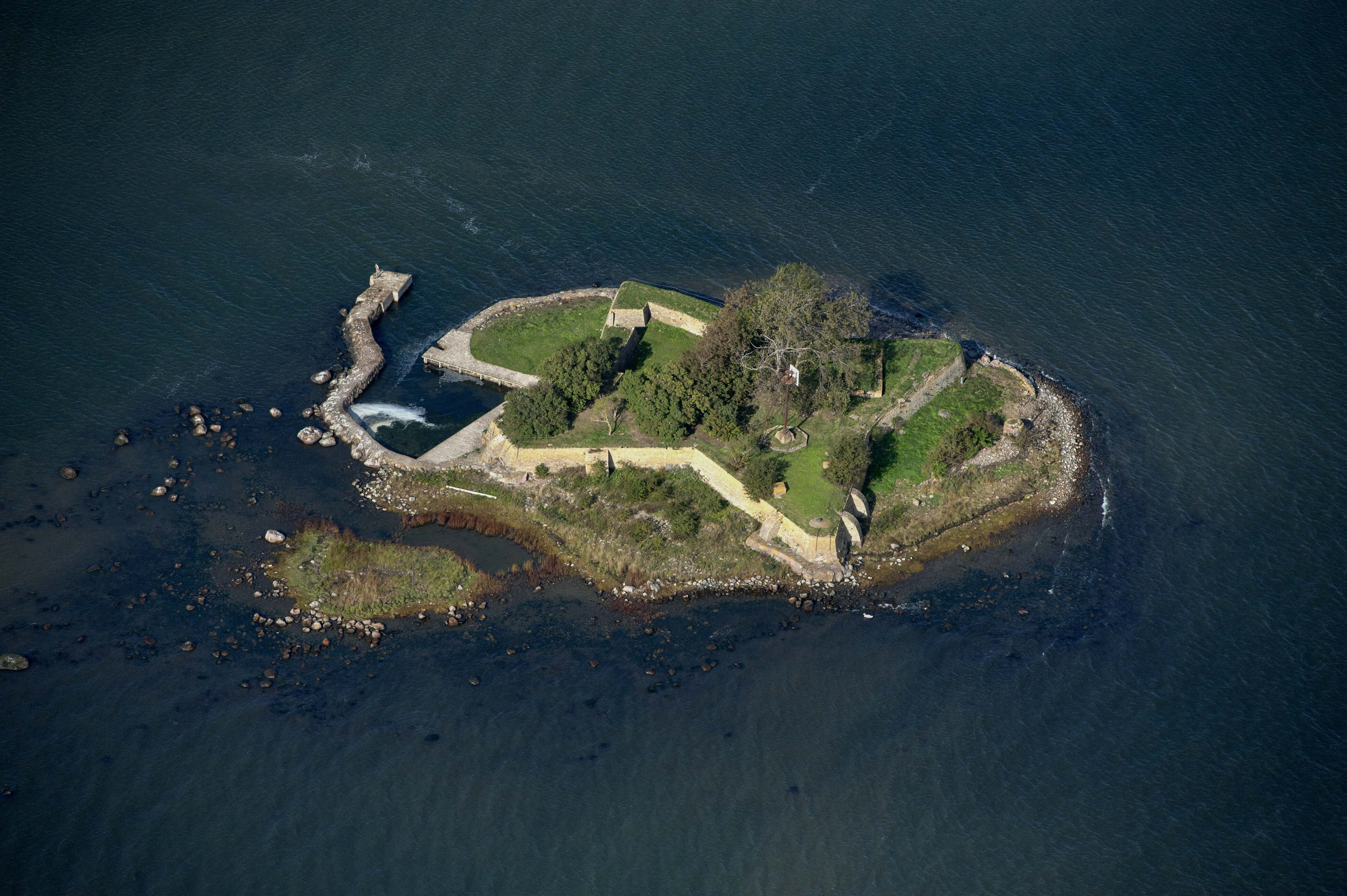
Aerial view of Grimskär in 2010

Grimskär is an island in the Kalmar Strait, Sweden, close to the city of Kalmar. During the Middle Ages, the island was probably used for executions of criminals, whose bodies were left displayed there as a warning to ships passing by. Its strategic location made it frequently contested during hostilities between Sweden and Denmark. In the 16th century, ideas to fortify the island were put forward, and the first fort was constructed in 1611. In 1623, a larger star-shaped fort with three bastions was constructed. It saw action during the Scanian War in 1677–1679, and was repeatedly repaired and improved during the 17th and 18th centuries. By 1822, the fort had lost its military significance and was abandoned. The island was instead taken over by the predecessor of the Swedish Maritime Administration and, in 1837, a pilot station and a small lighthouse was built. A new, larger lighthouse was built in 1865. In 1931, the pilot station was moved to Kalmar and, in 1941, the lighthouse dismantled. A mine station was secretly installed in 1957, and operated throughout the Cold War until 1988. Today the island is cared for by the National Property Board of Sweden. Grimskär is open to the public and it is possible to visit the island.

== Location and early history ==
Grimskär is a small island or islet located close to the harbour of Kalmar, in Kalmar Strait, Sweden. During the Middle Ages, the strait between mainland Sweden and Öland was not yet dredged and difficult to navigate. Only two channels existed where ships could pass, one which passed very close to Kalmar Castle and the other close to Grimskär. Its tactical and strategic value was therefore recognised early on, and during the 15th and early 16th century the island was frequently contested during hostilities between Sweden and Denmark. Before the 16th century, the island was called Stegelholmen after the Swedish word for gibbeting, stegling, and was probably used for executions of criminals, whose bodies were left displayed there as a warning to ships passing by. Its modern name, attested since 1534, probably derives from the Swedish word grima, a pole with an ornamental top that served as a daymark for sailors.

== Fort ==
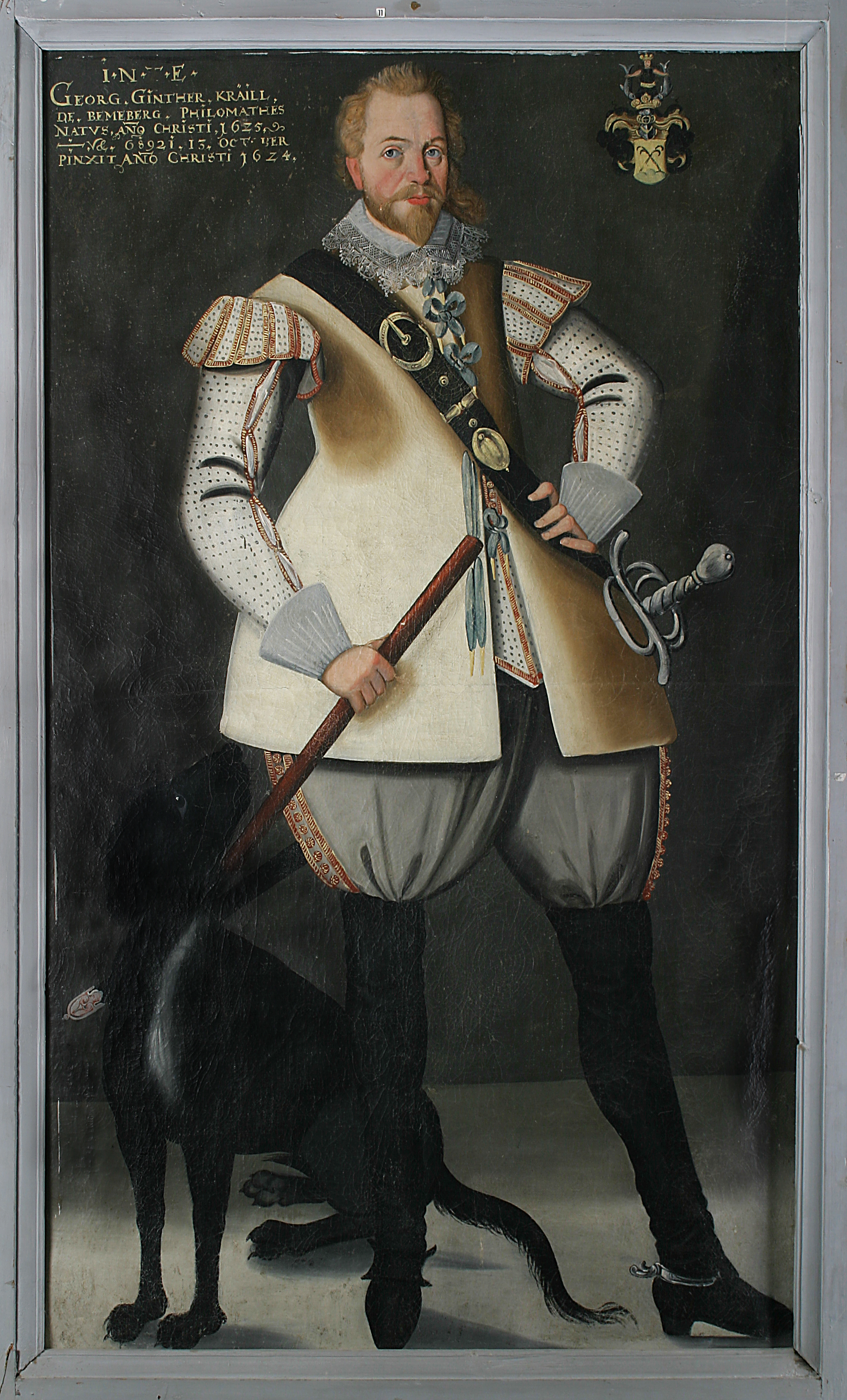
Military engineer Georg Günther Kräill von Bemeberg, who designed the fort on Grimskär.

The first time it was suggested the island be fortified was during the Swedish War of Liberation. A Swedish force besieging Kalmar Castle proposed to the Lord High Constable of Sweden, Svante Stensson Sture, that building a blockhouse on the island from an old barge could stop the Danish Navy from providing support to the besieged castle. King Gustav Vasa considered fortifying the island, but found it too expensive; his son Erik XIV however, in 1562, ordered the construction of a blockhouse, but despite repeated orders it was never constructed. It was only during the Kalmar War and the Siege of Kalmar that a rudimentary fortress was constructed on the island in 1611. In 1623, in anticipation of a Polish invasion that never materialised, the castellan of Kalmar Castle Herman Wrangel received orders to fortify the island more properly, and military engineer Georg Günther Kräill von Bemeberg was tasked with directing the work and finally build a more permanent fortification. The fort constructed was a star-shaped fort with three bastions, measuring 60 metres (200 ft) between its furthermost points.

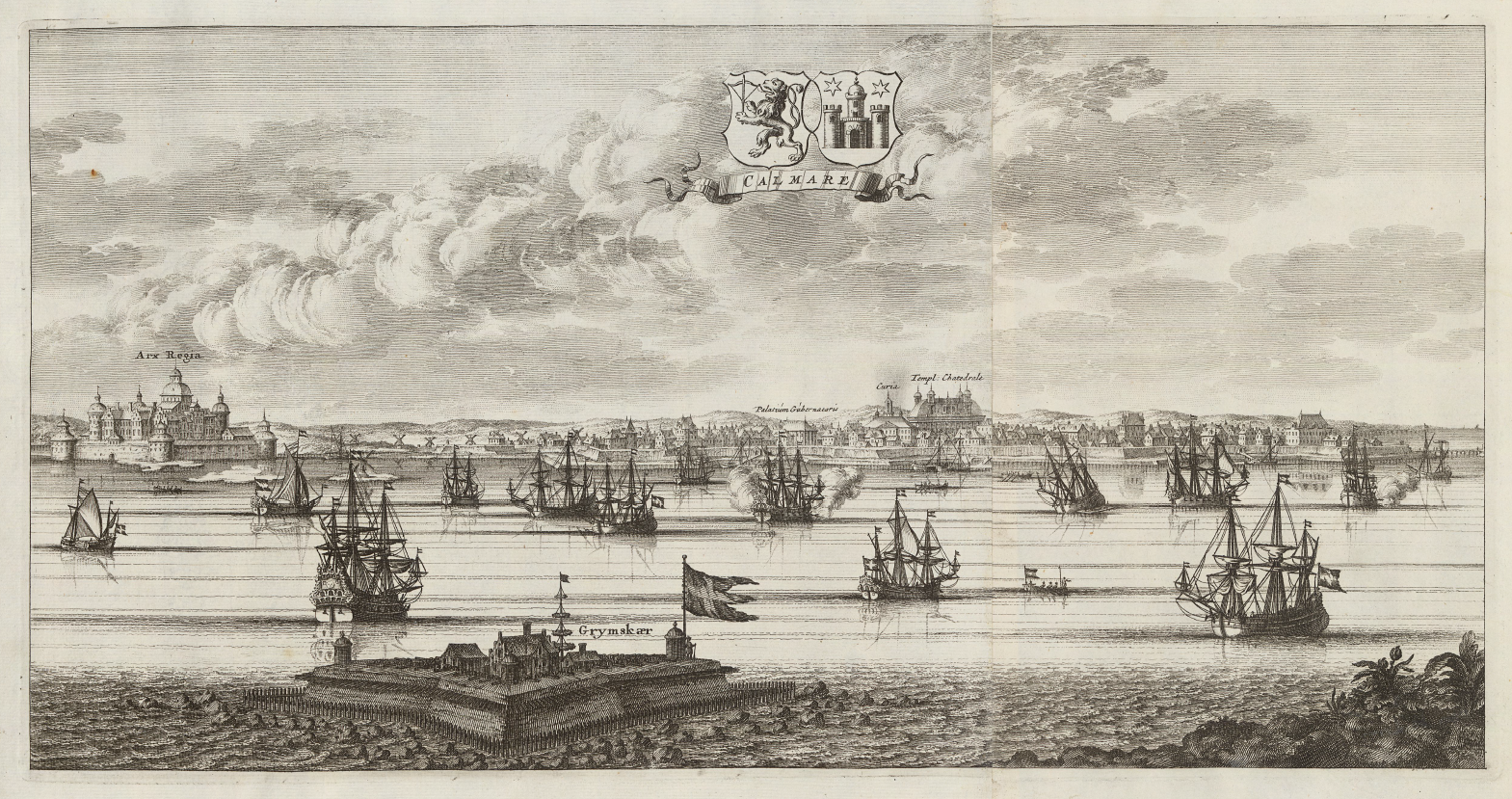
Grimskär (in the foreground), engraving by Willem Swidde in Suecia antiqua et hodierna (1693)

The fort suffered from being exposed to harsh weather conditions and had to be continuously repaired in the following decades. It saw action during the Scanian War in 1677–1679, and successfully prevented Dutch and Danish warships from seizing control of Kalmar Strait. It was repaired and strengthened in 1685–1696, and again in 1743–1745 (following the Russo-Swedish War of 1741–1743), and for the last time in 1794–1795. In 1822, the fort had lost its strategic importance and was evacuated and closed.

== Lighthouse ==
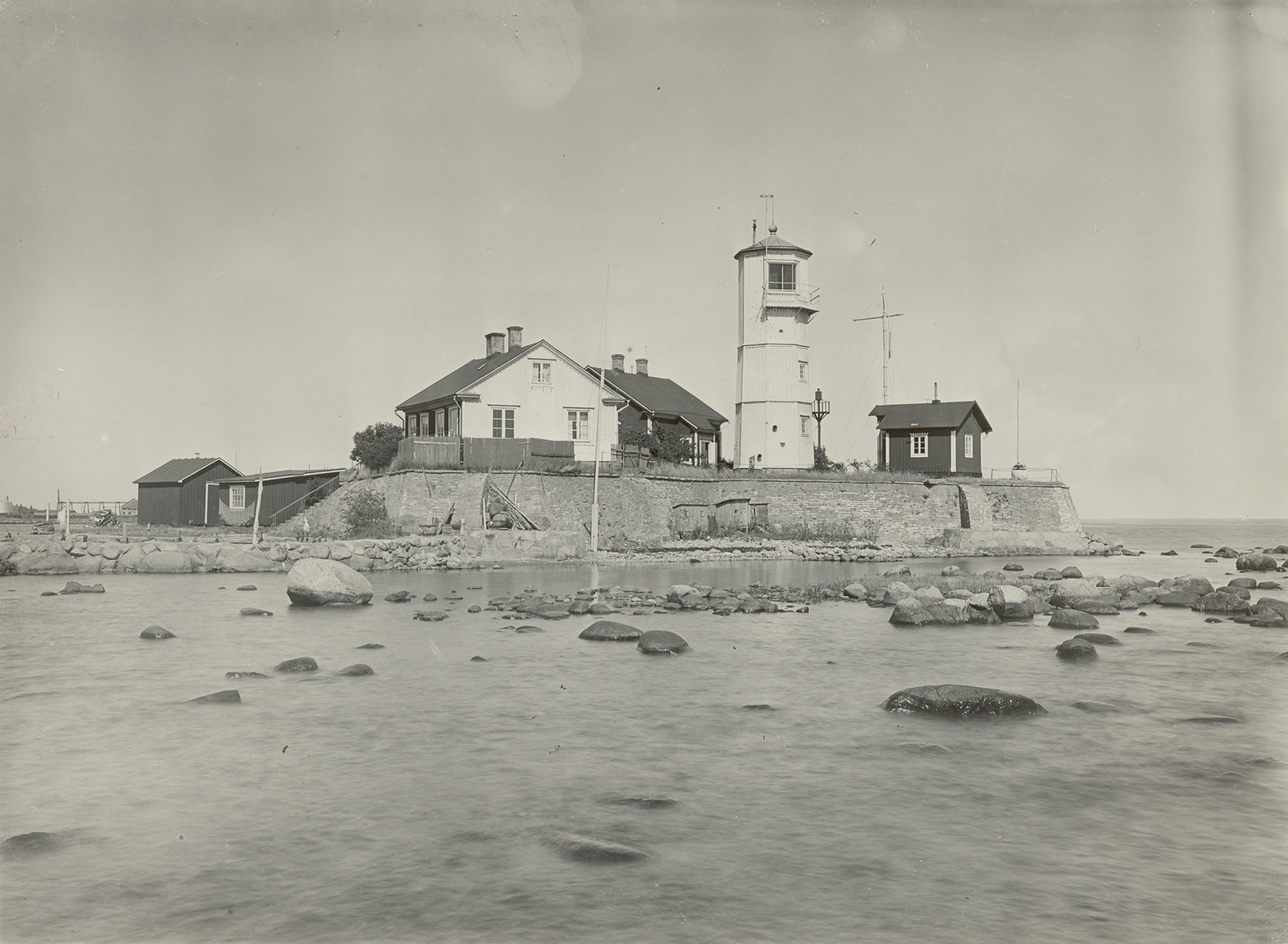
Grimskär in 1927, when it still was permanently inhabited

The island was taken over by the predecessor of the Swedish Maritime Administration. In 1837, a pilot station was opened on Grimskär. The same year a small lighthouse was built and initially maintained by local merchants, but in 1851, the state took over the lighthouse and also improved it. In 1865, a larger octagonal lighthouse was built, designed by architect Albert Theodor Gellerstedt and engineer Gustaf von Heidenstam. The island was inhabited for about 90 years by a lighthouse keeper, often with a family, and had a continuous presence of pilots. A telephone was installed on the island in 1914. In 1931, the pilot station was moved to Kalmar and the lighthouse was replaced with a more modern structure in a different location in 1940. One year later, the lighthouse on Grimskär was demolished. Soon after, the other buildings on the island were also torn down. Today, only the stone walls of the fort remain above ground.

== Mine station ==
The Swedish Armed Forces however returned to the island in 1957, and during the Cold War a mine station operated on the island. The construction and operation of the mine station was secret. It was an underground facility with a crew of 12 soldiers from the Swedish Coastal Artillery. From the mine station, eight mines could be detonated remotely if an enemy ship passed overhead. Each mine was armed with 200 kilograms (440 lb) of TNT. The installation was supported by observation posts on the mainland. The purpose was to be able to deny an invader, or Soviet submarines, access to the narrow passage of Kalmar Strait. Similar mine stations existed in other parts of Sweden as well. The mine station was closed in 1988, and the installations on the island are today cared for by the National Property Board of Sweden. Grimskär is open to the public and it is possible to visit the island.

== Sources cited ==
- Elsby, Leif (2013). "Fyrplatsen Grimskär i Kalmarsund" (PDF). Blänket (in Swedish). Svenska Fyrsällskapet.
- W:son Munthe, L. (1931). "Georg Günther Kräill von Bemebergh". Svenskt biografiskt lexikon (in Swedish). Vol. 9. p. 65 – via Swedish National Archives.
