= Väderöbod =

Väderöbod lighthouse Väderöbod
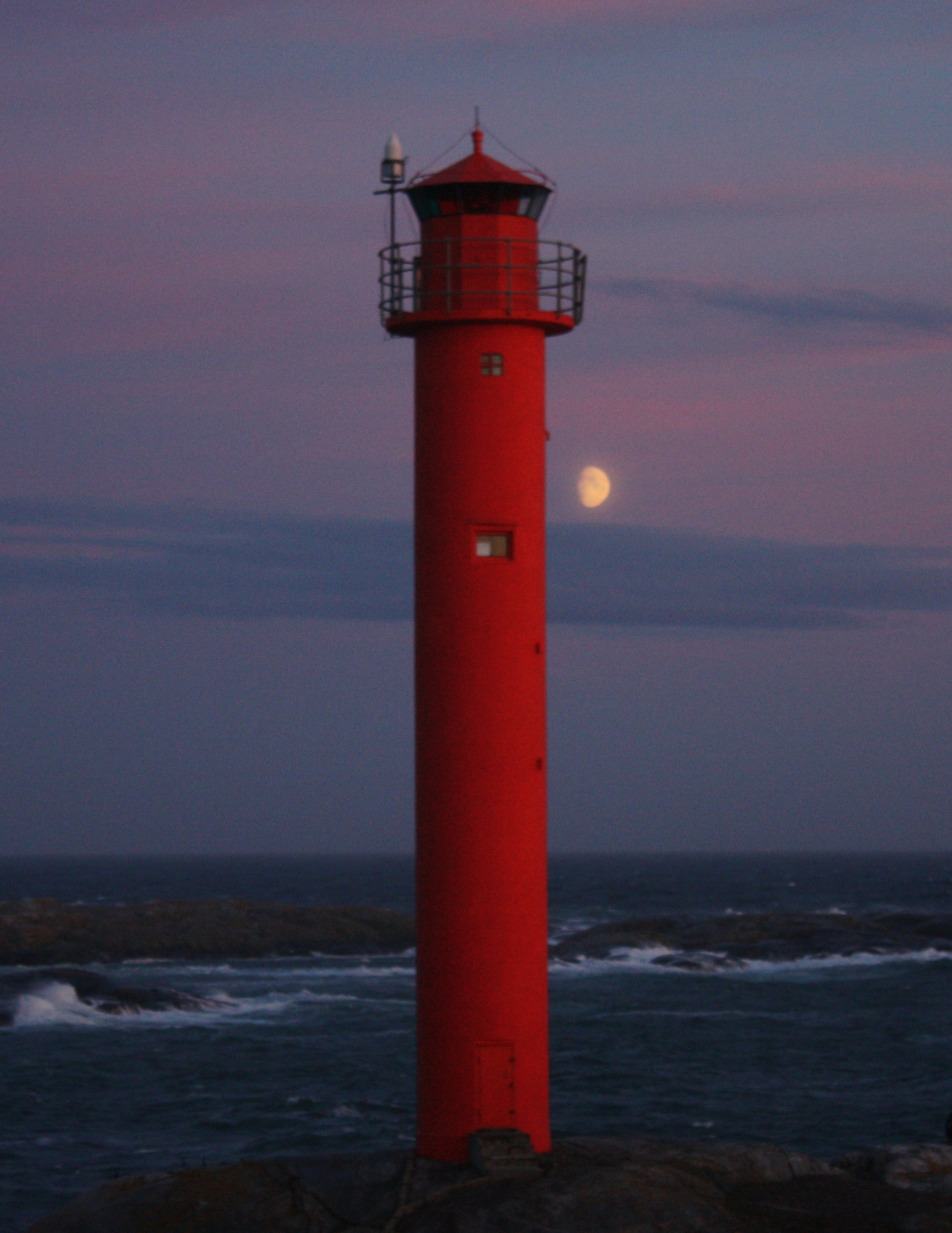
- Väderöbod Lighthouse
- Location: Väderöarna; Bohuslän; Sweden
- Coordinates: 58.541669°N 11.030402°E

Tower
- Constructed: 1867 (first)
- Construction: concrete tower
- Automated: 1965
- Height: 19 metres (62 ft)
- Shape: narrow cylindrical tower with balcony and lantern
- Markings: red tower and lantern
- Operator: Swedish Maritime Administration (Sjöfartsverket)
- Racon: C

Light
- First lit: 1964 (current)
- Focal height: 32 metres (105 ft)
- Lens: 2nd order "Henry Lepaute" Fresnel lens (original), 4th order dioptric lens (current)
- Range: 6 nautical miles (11 km; 6.9 mi)
- Characteristic: LFl W 8s
- Sweden no.: SV-8466

Väderöbod is a lighthouse and an island in the southern part of Väderöarna archipelago located in Bohuslän, Sweden.

== History ==
The southernmost island of Väderöarna, Guleskär was first chosen for the construction of the lighthouse in 1867. Further inquiries on the spot, however, showed that conditions on Guleskär were such that it was largely impossible to build a lighthouse on the island. The island was barely possible to reach even in good weather conditions. Instead Väderöbod island, just north of Guleskär was chosen for the new lighthouse. The lighthouse, a 19-meter high lattice structure designed by Gustaf von Heidenstam, was commissioned in 1867 and first lit on the night of 23 September that year. The light ran on colza oil. It was updated with a kerosene lamp in 1887, and in 1907 a powerful gas mantle light was installed.

The old lighthouse was deactivated at the end of 1964–65, when a 19-meter high lighthouse of concrete replaced Heidenstams tower. The new lighthouse was painted orange with a black center section. Since the new lighthouse was automated and electrified, it got a power cord pulled from the mainland to Väderöarna. At the turn of 1965–1966 the last lighthouse keeper moved from the island. In 1970, the old lighthouse was blown away from the mountain and was scrapped. The Lantern and lens was however rescued and can be seen at the community center "Nestorsgården" in Fjällbacka.

Until 2000 the new lighthouse was operated with electricity through a 50KV cable from the country and also had a backup of acetylene and an exterior facade lighting. Racon was also installed. When the lighthouse was converted to solar cell operation in 2000, the lamp power was amended to 20 W and the range of visibility dropped to half of before.

On 15 September 2010 the Swedish Maritime Administration sold Väderöbods lighthouse to a nonprofit association on Väderöbod for one swedish crown. The association assumes to voluntarily maintain and operate it to continue the cultural work began in 1979 when work to renovate and maintain the lighthouse buildings began.

In conjunction with the closure of the lighthouse a 6 W LED light was installed, the red and green sectors were replaced by white light, and the range of visibility was reduced to six nautical miles and the racon removed.

== Gallery ==
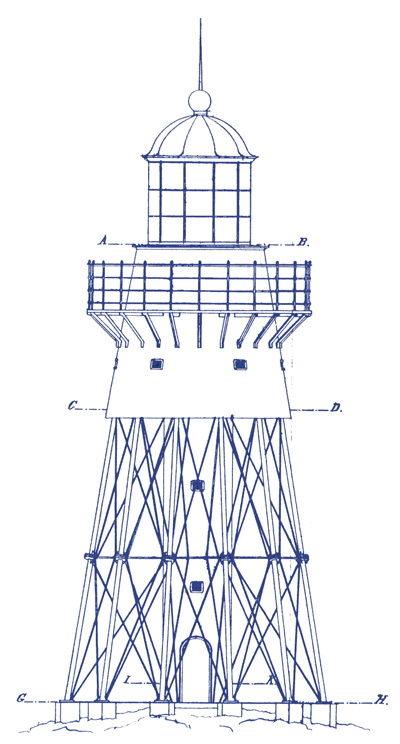
Sketching of the original 1867 lighthouse.

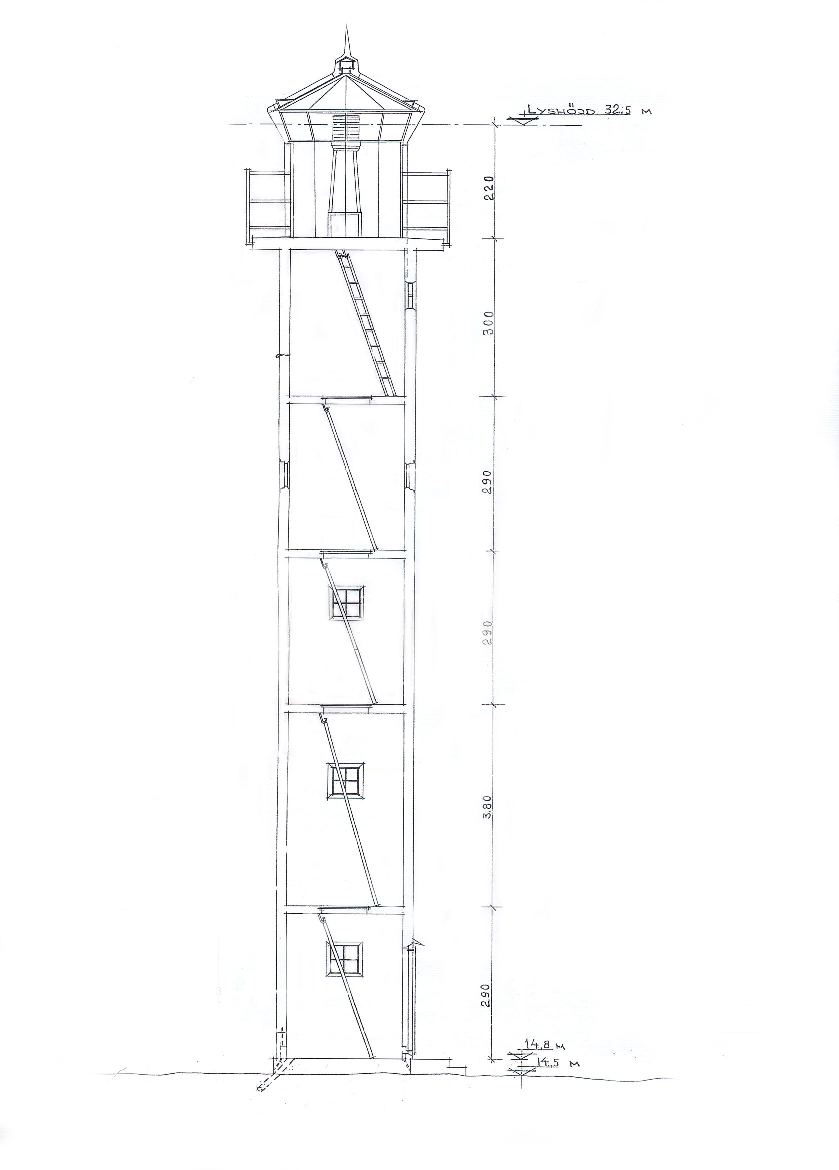
Sketching of the present lighthouse.

== See also ==
- List of lighthouses and lightvessels in Sweden
