= List of shipwrecks in July 1887 =

The list of shipwrecks in July 1887 includes ships sunk, foundered, grounded, or otherwise lost during July 1887.

== 1 July ==
List of shipwrecks: 1 July 1887
Ship	State	Description
Olaf	Imperial Russian Navy	The paddle frigate ran aground off Santahamina, Grand Duchy of Finland. She was refloated and resumed her voyage.

== 2 July ==
List of shipwrecks: 2 July 1887
Ship	State	Description
Vine	United Kingdom	The schooner was wrecked off St. Ives, Cornwall. Her crew were rescued by the schooner Jacques Mathieu (France).

== 3 July ==
List of shipwrecks: 3 July 1887
Ship	State	Description
Charles P. Thompson	United States	The schooner was wrecked on the Blonde Rocks, off Seal Island, Nova Scotia, Canada. Her crew were rescued.

== 5 July ==
List of shipwrecks: 5 July 1887
Ship	State	Description
Colorado	United Kingdom	The ship was wrecked at Tierra del Fuego Chile with loss of life. Eight of her crew were rescued. She was on a voyage from Hull, Yorkshire to Valparaíso, Chile.

== 7 July ==
List of shipwrecks: 7 July 1887
Ship	State	Description
Meppleton	United Kingdom	The steamship ran aground on the Melvin Rocks, near the Lizard Lighthouse, Cornwall. She was on a voyage from Calais, France to Newport, Monmouthshire. She was refloated and completed her voyage in a leaky conditio.
Onward	United Kingdom	The Thames barge collided with the steamship Hawthorns (United Kingdom) and sank in the North Sea between the Cross Sand and Newarp Lightships (both Trinity House). Onward was on a voyage from Harwich, Essex to Seaham, County Durham.

== 8 July ==
List of shipwrecks: 8 July 1887
Ship	State	Description
Carl	United Kingdom	The ship was driven ashore on Anticosti Island, Quebec, Canada. She was on a voyage from "Saumtacochon" to London. She was consequently condemned.
Cavour	United Kingdom	The steamship was driven ashore and wrecked in a hurricane at "Bujury", Brazil. Her crew survived.

== 9 July ==
List of shipwrecks: 9 July 1887
Ship	State	Description
Barremann	United Kingdom	The sailing ship hit the Pollard Rock within the Seven Stones Reef, between the Isles of Scilly and Cornwall with the loss of all of the twenty-seven crew. She was on voyage from South Shields, County Durham to San Francisco, California, United States.
Cardiff	Trieste	The barque arrived at Cardiff, Glamorgan, United Kingdom in a waterlogged condition. She was on a voyage from Pensacola, Florida, United States to Cardiff.
E. W. Merchant	United States	The schooner was wrecked on the Shovelful Shoal. Her crew were rescued.
Thornborough	United Kingdom	The steamship collided with the steamship Glamis Castle (United Kingdom) and sank in the English Channel off Dungeness, Kent. Her crew survived.

== 10 July ==
List of shipwrecks: 10 July 1887
Ship	State	Description
Alfredia	(United Kingdom of Great Britain and Ireland) Cape Colony	The steamship was wrecked at Port St Johns. All on board survived. She was on a voyage from the Natal Colony to East London.
Edwin	United Kingdom	The Thames barge sprang a leak and sank in the River Thames at Barking, Essex.
Merrimac	United States	The steamship was wrecked on "Little Hope Island", 10 nautical miles (19 km) off Liverpool, Nova Scotia, Canada. All on board, more than 100 people, were rescued. She was on a voyage from Halifax, Nova Scotia to Boston, Massachusetts.
Mystery	United States	The yacht capsized during a squall in New York harbour. Over twenty excursionists drowned.
Python	United Kingdom	The tug was abandoned in the North Sea off the coast of Suffolk. Her crew were rescued by the steamship Calabria (United Kingdom). Python was on a voyage from Hull, Yorkshire to London. She was towed in to Gravesend, Kent by Calabria.
Venus	Sweden	The schooner ran aground on the Bigger Rock, in the Firth of Forth and was wrecked. Her crew survived. She was on a voyage from Kennetpans, Clackmannanshire, United Kingdom to Trelleborg.

== 12 July ==
List of shipwrecks: 12 July 1887
Ship	State	Description
Gertrude	United Kingdom	The ship sank at Belfast, County Antrim. She was refloated on 16 July.
Kentigern	United Kingdom	The barque ran aground in the River Lagan. She was on a voyage from Saint John, New Brunswick, Canada to Belfast. She was refloated and taken in to Belfast.
Lioness	United Kingdom	The tug foundered in the English Channel off Whitecliffe, Dorset. Her crew survived. She was on a voyage from Cowes, Isle of Wight to Dublin. The master was found guilty of scuttling the tug and was sentenced to seven years penal servitude.
Mauritius	United Kingdom	The steamship ran aground at Greenock, Renfrewshire. She was refloated the next day and resumed her voyage.
Unnamed	United Kingdom	The tug was deliberately scuttled at Bembridge, Isle of Wight.

== 13 July ==
List of shipwrecks: 13 July 1887
Ship	State	Description
Grecian	United Kingdom	The ship ran aground at Blankenese, Germany She was on a voyage from Rangoon, Burma to Hamburg, Germany. She was refloated and taken in to Hamburg.

== 14 July ==
List of shipwrecks: 14 July 1887
Ship	State	Description
Rouen	France	The steamship ran aground at "Osita", Japan. Her crew were rescued. She subsequently became a wreck.

== 15 July ==
List of shipwrecks: 15 July 1887
Ship	State	Description
Malvina	United Kingdom	The ship was sighted whilst on a voyage from Cardiff, Glamorgan to Bangkok, Siam. No further trace, reported overdue.

== 18 July ==
List of shipwrecks: 18 July 1887
Ship	State	Description
Unnamed	United Kingdom	The fishing lugger struck the Hennick Rock, off The Lizard, Cornwall and sank. Both crew were rescued.

== 20 July ==
List of shipwrecks: 20 July 1887
Ship	State	Description
Aydon Forest	United Kingdom	The ship departed from Mobile, Alabama, United States for Havre de Grâce, Seine-Inférieure, France. No further trace, reported overdue.
Woodbine	United Kingdom	The steamship departed from Savanna-la-Mar, Jamaica for Fleetwood, Lancashire. No further trace, reported overdue.

== 23 July ==
List of shipwrecks: 23 July 1887
Ship	State	Description
Freda	Flag unknown	The yacht sank off Saint-Lunaire, Ille-et-Vilaine, France.

== 25 July ==
List of shipwrecks: 25 July 1887
Ship	State	Description
Woodbine	United Kingdom	The ship departed from Savanna-la-Mar, Jamaica for Fleetwood, Lancashire. No further trace, reported overdue.

== 26 July ==
List of shipwrecks: 26 July 1887
Ship	State	Description
Amanda	United States	The schooner capsized in a storm off Piney Point in Choctawhatchee Bay, Florida.
Arthur	United Kingdom	The brig was abandoned in the Atlantic Ocean and subsequently foundered. Her eight crew were rescued by the steamship Arizona (United Kingdom). Arthur was on a voyage from Ship Island, Mississippi, United States to the Canary Islands.

== 27 July ==
List of shipwrecks: 27 July 1887
Ship	State	Description
Enfield	United Kingdom	The steamship was driven ashore at Gråsgärd, Öland, Sweden. She was refloated on 30 July with assistance from Hermes and Poseidon (both Sweden) and taken in to Stockholm, Sweden for repairs.
H. S. Rowe	United States	The schooner was wrecked in a storm 25 nautical miles (46 km) east of East Pass, Destin, Florida.
Primitive	United Kingdom	The fishing boat was driven ashore and wrecked at Sunderland, County Durham.
Wolverine	United Kingdom	The yacht was driven ashore at Southsea, Hampshire.

== 30 July ==
List of shipwrecks: 30 July 1887
Ship	State	Description
Monmouth	United States	The schooner was run down and sunk off Cape Cod, Massachusetts by the brig Energy (United Kingdom). Her crew were rescued.
Twilight	United States	The steamship sank in the St. John's River. Her engineer died.

== 31 July ==
List of shipwrecks: 31 July 1887
Ship	State	Description
Danish Monarch	United Kingdom	The steamship ran aground in the Suez Canal. She was refloated.

== Unknown date ==
List of shipwrecks: Unknown date in July 1887
Ship	State	Description
Alejandro	Mexico	The steamship was driven ashore north of San Blas.
Alfreda	(Dominion of Newfoundland) Newfoundland Colony	The coaster was wrecked at Saint John's.
Amir	India	The flat was severely damaged by fire at "Serajgunge".
Atlantic	United Kingdom	The barque put in to Fårösund, Gotland, Sweden in a waterlogged condition. She was on a voyage from Luleå, Sweden to London. She was condemned.
Cabo Finisterre	Spain	The steamship was wrecked at Sagres Point, Portugal. All on board were rescued.
Cambrian	United Kingdom	The steamship ran aground on a sunken pile in the River Ouse and was holed. She was on a voyage from Goole, Yorkshire to Calais, France. She was refloated on 2 July and taken in to drydock for repairs.
Charger	United Kingdom	The ship ran aground in the Mississippi River.
Emu	United Kingdom	The ketch was driven ashore at Breaksea Point, Glamorgan.
Enniskilen	United Kingdom	The steamship was driven ashore in the Svenska Högarna, Sweden.
Entico	United States	The schooner was abandoned in the Atlantic Ocean before 10 July.
Fair City	United Kingdom	The schooner ran aground on the Mucking Flat, in the Thames Estuary.
Foxhall	United Kingdom	The steamship ran aground on the Colorados, off the coast of Cuba. She was refloated and taken in to Phildadelphia, Pennsylvania, United States.
George Dittmann	Germany	The steamship ran aground in the Nieuwe Diep. She was on a voyage from Hamburg to Amsterdam, North Holland, Netherlands. She was refloated with the assistance of a tug.
Grandholme	Canada	The steamship was driven ashore and was damaged at Kamouraska, Quebec. She was on a voyage from Montreal, Quebec to Sydney, Nova Scotia.
Investigator	United States	The ship collided with a schooner and was severely damaged. She was on a voyage from Santa Cruz to New York, United States.
Lady Nell	United Kingdom	The steamship was driven ashore on Læsø, Denmark. She was on a voyage from Kiel, Germany to Bergen, Norway. She was refloated and taken in to Gothenburg, Sweden.
Lina	Norway	The barque was wrecked on the coast of Labrador, Newfoundland Colony.
Marie	Norway	The barque ran aground in the River Lune. She was on a voyage from Richibucto, New Brunswick, Canada to Glasson Dock, Lancashire, United Kingdom.
Martha S.	United States	The steamship was driven ashore at Woods Hole, Massachusetts. She was refloated but had to be beached. All on board were rescued.
Nancy Holt	United States	The ship was abandoned in the Pacific Ocean before 31 July. She was on a voyage from Eureka, California to Melbourne, Victoria.
Nicosian	United Kingdom	The steamship was driven ashore at Sundre, Gotland. She was refloated with assistance and resumed her voyage.
Orion	Germany	The barque was wrecked on Charles Island, Bermuda. Her crew were rescued.
Oruro	United Kingdom	The barque was abandoned at sea. Her crew were rescued. She was on a voyage from Peru to Liverpool, Lancashire.
Osbergs	United Kingdom	The full-rigged ship ran aground in the Nieuwe Diep. She was on a voyage from Baltimore, Maryland, United States to Hamburg. She was refloated with the assistance of a tug.
Prins Fredrik	United Kingdom	The steamship ran aground 6 nautical miles (11 km) east of Cheribon, Netherlands East Indies. She was refloated.
Ravenhill	United Kingdom	The steamship was driven ashore at Cape Vilano, Spain. She was on a voyage from Cardiff, Glamorgan to Brindisi, Italy. She was a total loss.
Río Apa	Empire of Brazil	The steamship put out to sea from Rio de Janeiro before 8 July. Presumed subsequently foundered with the loss of all on board.
Riversdale	United Kingdom	The steamship ran aground on the Banjaard Sand, in the North Sea off the coast of Zeeland, Netherlands. She was on a voyage from Odesa, Russia to Bremen, Germany. She was refloated with the assistance of seven tugs and put in to Brouwershaven, Zeeland.
Romo	United Kingdom	The barque was driven ashore and wrecked at Nantucket, Massachusetts.
Shamrock	United Kingdom	The steamship was driven ashore at Whitehead, County Antrim. She was on a voyage from Belfast to Whitehead.
Sirius	Russia	The steamship was driven ashore at Nasby, Öland, Sweden. SHe was refloated and taken in to Copenhagen, Denmark, where she arrived on 13 July.
Springwood	United Kingdom	The ship was wrecked on Redonda, Leeward Islands. She was on a voyage from Redonda to Booth Bay, Maine, United States.
Thornholme	United Kingdom	The steamship ran aground at Quebec City, Canada.
