= Hätteberget =

Hätteberget lighthouse Hätteberget
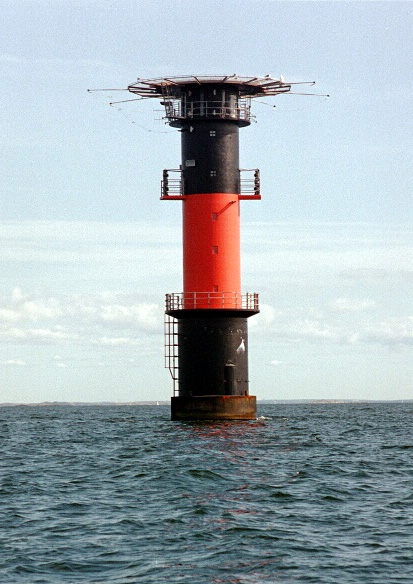
- Location: South of Marstrand; Västra Götaland County; Sweden
- Coordinates: 57.863544°N 11.458954°E

Tower
- Constructed: 1977
- Foundation: concrete caisson
- Construction: concrete tower
- Height: 26 metres (85 ft)
- Shape: cylindrical tower with double balcony, lantern and helipad on the top
- Markings: black tower with a broad central red band
- Power source: electricity
- Operator: Swedish Maritime Administration (Sjöfartsverket)
- Racon: G

Light
- Focal height: 26 metres (85 ft)
- Range: white: 21 nautical miles (39 km; 24 mi) red: 15 nautical miles (28 km; 17 mi) green: 15 nautical miles (28 km; 17 mi)
- Characteristic: Fl (2) WRG 12s.
- Sweden no.: SV-7925

Hätteberget is a Swedish docking lighthouse situated in the sea west of Marstrand and south of Tjörn. It was built in 1977 to replace the Pater Noster Lighthouse. The lighthouse is a 26-metre-high (85 ft) concrete tower with helicopter landing. It is painted with a red horizontal band and has a gray cap on top. The light from its white sector can reach 21.5 nautical miles (39.8 km).

== See also ==
- List of lighthouses and lightvessels in Sweden
