= Georg Günther Kräill von Bemeberg =

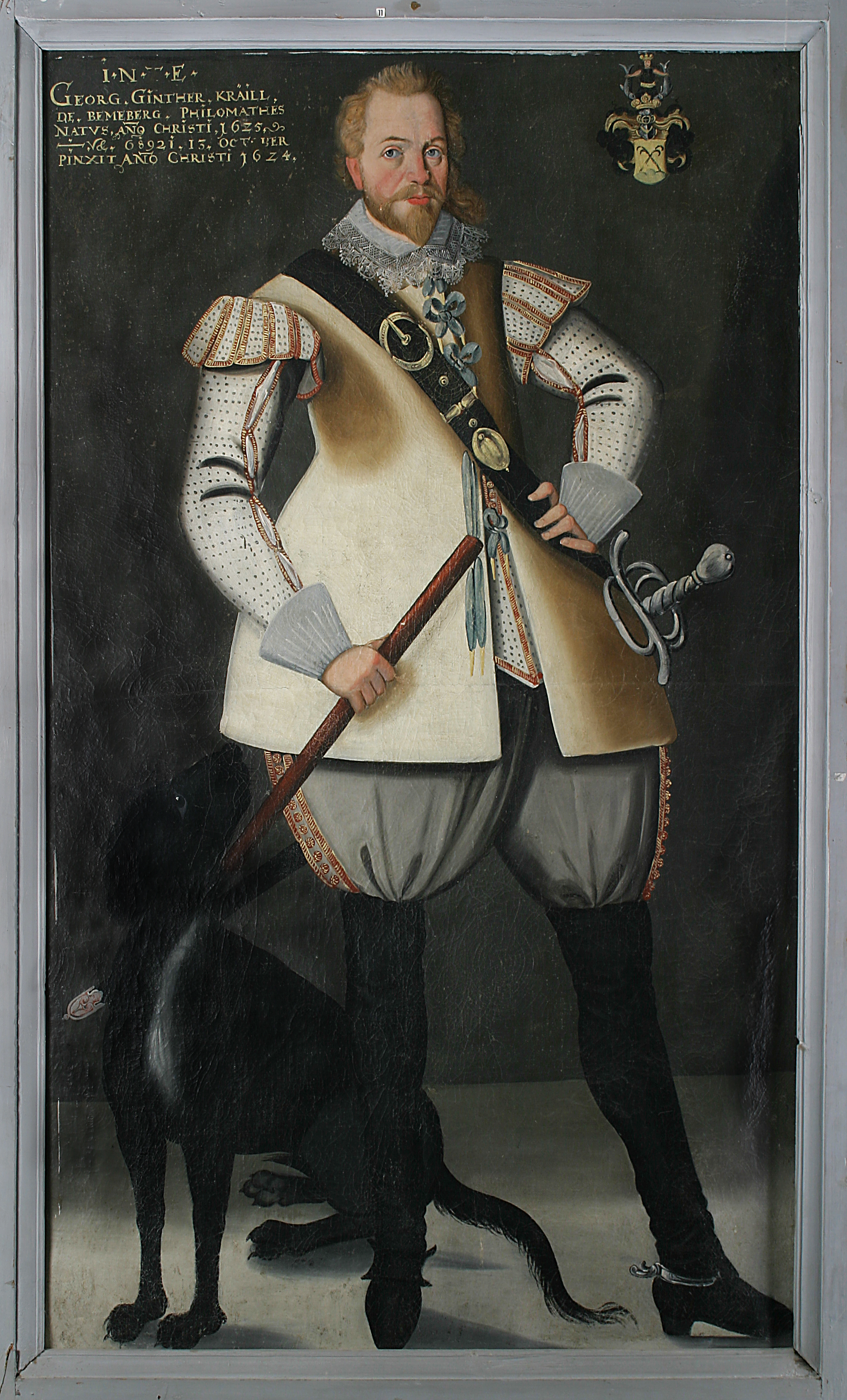
Georg Günther Kräill von Bemeberg, self-portrait in Skokloster Castle

Georg Günther Kräill von Bemeberg (also Krail, Crail von Bamberg; late 16th century – 1 January 1641) was a German-born fortification officer and cartographer in Swedish service. He came from Ulm in present-day Germany and was educated in the Netherlands. He entered Swedish service around 1619–20 and participated in the siege of Riga in 1621. He spent much of his life in Swedish service working to improve fortresses both in mainland Sweden and other parts of the Swedish Empire; he also accompanied the Swedish army during the Polish–Swedish War of 1626–1629. He spent the last years of his life on his estate at Herrökna.

Georg Günther Kräill von Bemeberg was a highly appreciated fortification officer and was amply rewarded by the Swedish Crown for his service. He was recognised as a member of the Swedish nobility and upon his retirement given an annual pension. Through his contribution of maps and plans of Swedish forts, cities and provinces, Georg Günther Kräill von Bemeberg was also among the earliest professional cartographers active in Sweden. He was also a painter and made a self-portrait and portraits of 19 other officers in Swedish service, still preserved in Skokloster Castle.

== Biography ==
Georg Günther Kräill von Bemeberg was born sometime during the late 16th century in Ulm, in southern Germany. In a letter to Axel Oxenstierna, the Lord High Chancellor of Sweden, in 1633 he appealed to help from him to regain certain estates in Salzburg that he claimed had belonged to his family but had been expropriated by "the Catholics", implying his family may have come from Austria and were Protestants. His father was a military officer and the city's garrison commander. Georg Günther Kräill von Bemeberg studied in the Netherlands and served in the Danish military, before entering Swedish military service, probably around 1619–20. In 1618 he published, in Arnheim, a work on fortifications, with the Latin title Tractatus geometricus et fortificationis.

He appears for the first time in Swedish sources soon thereafter as an engineer with the rank of captain. During the siege of Riga in 1621, he was one of the leading engineers on the Swedish side. A plan of the siege made by Kräill von Bemeberg is preserved in the Military Archives of Sweden. After the capture of the city, he led the work in rebuilding and strengthening of its defences.

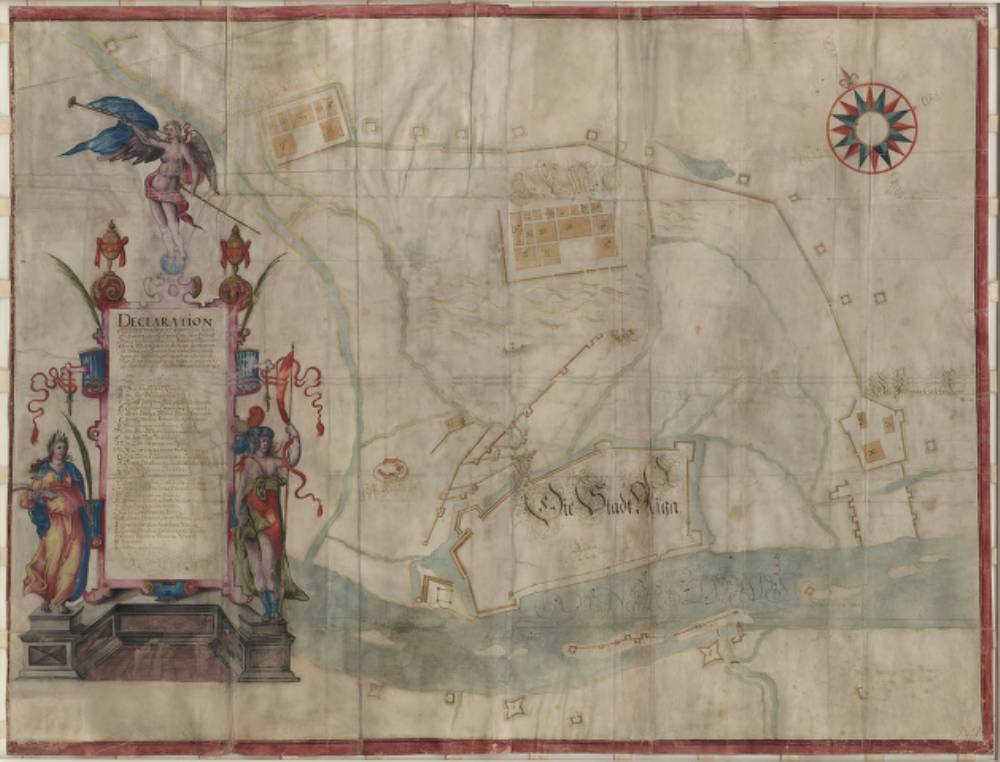
Map of the siege of Riga (1621) by Kräill von Bemeberg. He was among the first professional cartographers in Sweden.

In early 1623 he was in mainland Sweden and given the task of strengthening defences of Kalmar and constructing a small fort on the island of Grimskär, in anticipation of a Polish invasion. When the threat of invasion subsided, he was dispatched to Gothenburg in 1624 to improve the city's defences. The following year he was apparently in Södermanland, as copies of a map made by Kräill von Bemeberg of the province and dated to 1625 is preserved in Swedish archives. The same year he also made a rudimentary map of the large lake Mälaren.

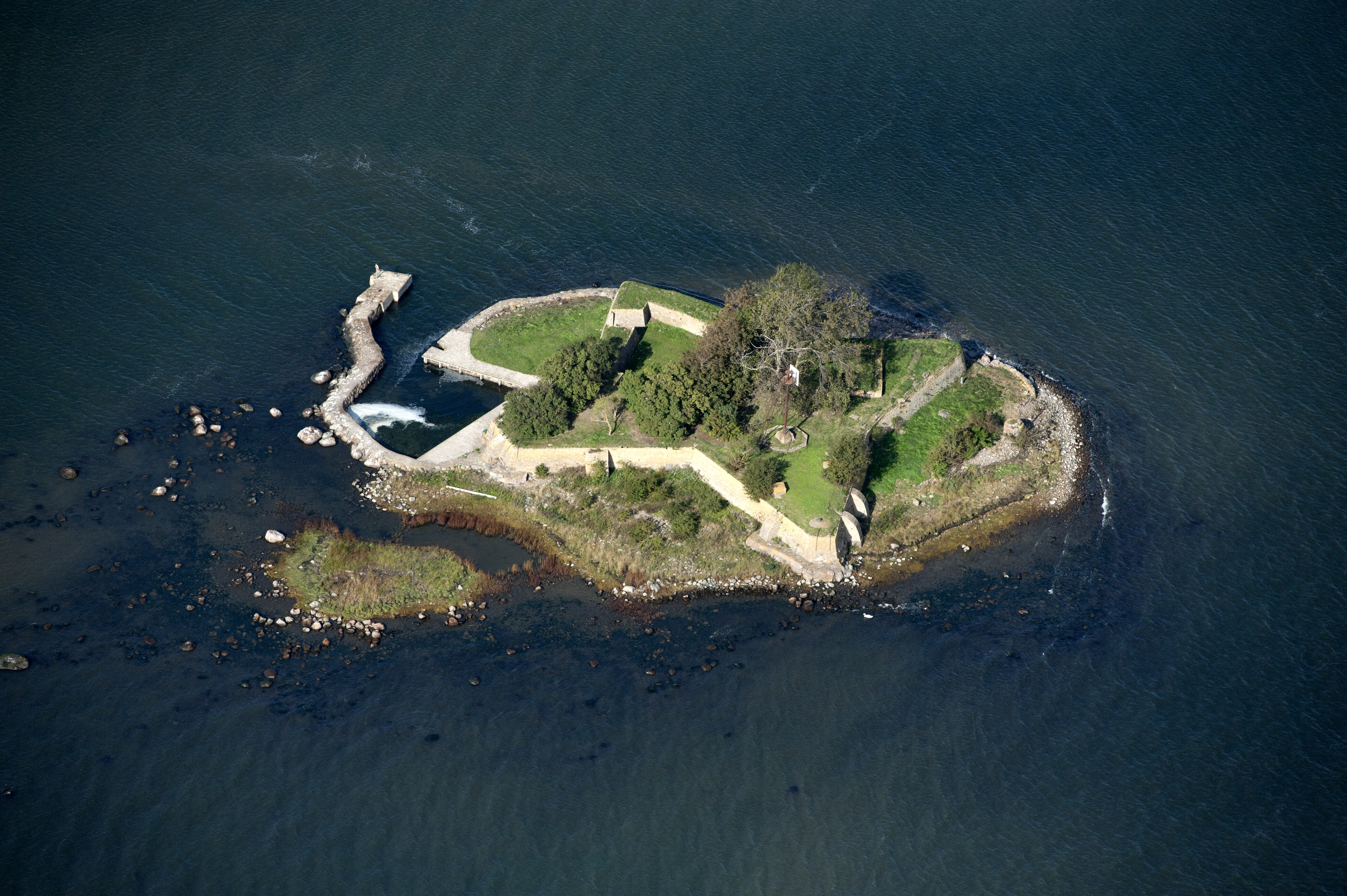
The fort on Grimskär island, designed by Kräill von Bemeberg

With the outbreak of the Polish–Swedish War (1626–1629), Kräill von Bemeberg accompanied the Swedish invasion of Polish Prussia as quartermaster general. In July 1627 he was engaged in building field fortifications around the Swedish camp at Tczew, in anticipation of the Battle of Dirschau. Soon thereafter he was sent to Rügen to improve the island's defences, but was allowed to return to mainland Sweden in 1631 due to poor health. Upon his return he became the first quartermaster general of Sweden proper, and was also tasked with educating new fortification officers. From 1631 he travelled extensively to different cities in Sweden, overseeing improvements to their defences. In 1634 he resigned from his official duties and retired to his estate at Herrökna. He was however recalled in 1635 and given the task of inspecting several fortification in the south of the country, and report back to the Privy Council. The following year his successor as quartermaster general, Olof Örnehufvud, returned permanently from the Swedish engagement in the Thirty Years' War on the continent, and Kräill von Bemeberg was granted final leave and an annual pension of 600 Swedish riksdalers. He spent his last years on his estate Herrökna and died on 1 January 1641. He is buried together with his second wife in Gryt Church, Södermanland.

Georg Günther Kräill von Bemeberg was married twice. His first marriage was with Dorotea Brackel, who was the daughter of the fortress commander of Ghent in present-day Belgium, Jobst Eberhard Brackel, and widow of the commander of Kalmar Castle, Henrik Camhus. His second wife was Kristina von Masenbach, daughter of the commander of Tre Kronor Castle.

== Apparaisal ==
Georg Günther Kräill von Bemeberg was highly appreciated as a fortification officer by the Swedish Crown. A contemporary note about him states that he was "clever" and he was amply rewarded for his services, including through donations of land in Södermanland and formal recognition of his status as a member of the Swedish nobility through so-called "naturalisation" (Introducerad adel).

He used the pen-name "Philomathes" (lover of learning), and besides his aforementioned Tractatus on fortification also wrote a three-volume work on mechanics and architecture, which remained unpublished (one volume containing illustrations was published as late as 1875). His high-quality plans and maps of forts, cities and provinces of Sweden place him among the earliest professional cartographers active in Sweden. He was also a painter; during the summer and fall of 1623, Georg Günther Kräill von Bemeberg painted the portraits of 20 Swedish officers, including a self-portrait, who had all participated in the 1621 siege of Riga. The paintings were commissioned by Field Marshal Herman Wrangel. They are today displayed in Skokloster Castle.

== Sources cited ==
- Dahl, Torsten, ed. (1948). Svenska män och kvinnor. Biografisk uppslagsbok [Swedish men and women. Biographical dictionary] (in Swedish). Vol. 2. Stockholm: Albert Bonnier. p. . OCLC 4629338.
- Elgenstierna, Gustaf (1926). Den introducerade svenska adelns ättartavlor (in Swedish). Vol. II. Stockholm: P. A. Nordstedt. OCLC 20464762.
- W:son Munthe, L. (1931). "Georg Günther Kräill von Bemebergh". Svenskt biografiskt lexikon (in Swedish). Vol. 9. p. 65 – via Swedish National Archives.
- Mead, William R. (2007). "60. Scandinavian Renaissance Cartography". In Woodward, David (ed.). The History of Cartography, Volume 3. Cartography in the European Renaissance (PDF). Chicago University Press. ISBN 0-226-90734-1.
