= Siege of Riga (1621) =

Part of the Polish–Swedish War of 1621–1625

- Part of the Polish–Swedish War (1621–1625)
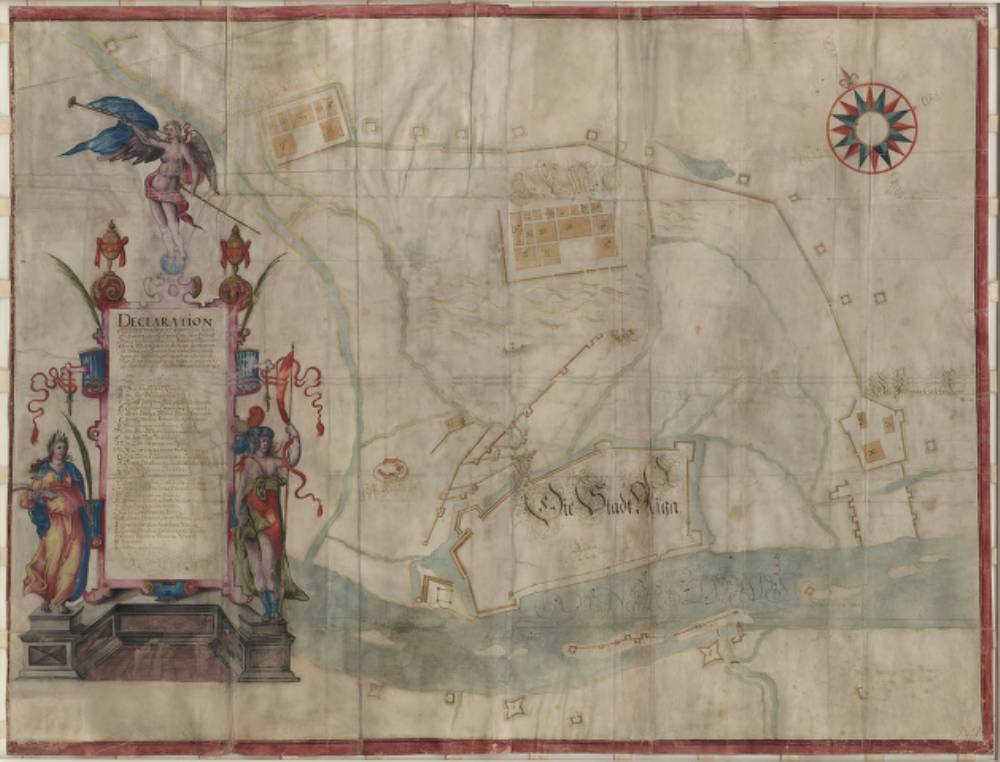
- Plan of the siege by Georg Günther Kräill von Bemeberg
Date	13 August – 15 September 1621
Location	Riga
Result	Swedish victory
Territorial changes	Riga captured

Belligerents
Swedish Empire	Polish–Lithuanian Commonwealth

Commanders and leaders
Gustavus Adolphus; Carl Gyllenhielm; Gustav Horn (WIA); Jacob De la Gardie (WIA); Georg Günther Kräill von Bemeberg	Krzysztof Radziwiłł

Strength
15,350 infantry 2,500 cavalry 56 cannons	3,700–7,000 city burghers 300–400 soldiers 40 cannons Relief force 1,500 men 3 cannons

Casualties and losses
	Thousands killed (Note: Less than 1,000 defenders survived the entire siege before capitulating)

The siege of Riga (Swedish: Belägringen av Riga; Polish: Oblężenie Rygi) was a successful Swedish siege of Riga during the Polish–Swedish War (1621–1625). It led to the capture of the city, and subsequently sent shockwaves through Europe.

== Background ==
In 1621, the king of Sweden, Gustavus Adolphus, declared that the previously signed truce between Sweden and the Polish–Lithuanian Commonwealth was void. At the time, the Commonwealth was at war with the Ottoman Empire regarding Moldavia, and with Gustavus' reforms in the Swedish army, he was ready to deploy his armies into Livonia once again.

=== Swedish forces ===
The Swedish army and fleet consisted of the following:

==== Ground forces ====
- 9 regiments of infantry (Note: Expanded to 14 regiments after being reinforced by Jacob De la Gardie)
- 10–11 cavalry companies (Note: Expanded to 23 or 24 regiments after being reinforced by Jacob De la Gardie)
- 56 cannons

==== Sea forces ====
- 106–109 transport vessels
- 25–30 warships
- 17 smaller ships
- 9 "hunters"

=== Prelude ===
Despite the Swedish fleet being dispersed and interrupted by a storm, it managed to set out on 3 August, sailed up in front of the Daugava, and stationed itself in front of Riga. The Swedes managed to land at Pernau on 7 August and began marching towards Riga.

The Grand Marshal of the Realm, Jacob De la Gardie, had also brought an additional five regiments of infantry and nine companies of cavalry from Finland, along with a retinue of Estonian nobles and four enlisted cavalry companies from Estonia, which was around 4,000–5,000 men in total.

Gustavus now had around 17,850 men in his field army, consisting of 14,700 infantry and 3,150 cavalry, which was the largest Swedish army ever brought overseas at this point.

== Siege ==
On 13 August, after the Swedes had arrived outside Riga, the city was quickly surrounded on all sides. The Riga garrison consisted of 300–400 foot soldiers and 3,700–7,000 burgher militia, although the entire population of 30,000 supported the defense. The defenders also had at their disposal a strong artillery force, consisting of around 40 cannons. The siege was the first "sophisticated siege" in Nordic history. When Gustavus Adolphus personally inspected the defences of Riga on 21 August, the Swedish army there consisted of 15,350 infantry, 2,500 cavalry, and 56 cannons.

Preparations for the bombardment of the city took place for 10 days, and on 23 August it began. 15,000 cannonballs were fired towards the city walls under a week's time. At certain points, upwards of 1,000 cannonballs were fired every hour. At the same time as the artillery on both sides was in action, the Swedes were digging closer to the city. Gustavus Adolphus and his illegitimate brother, Karl Karlsson Gyllenhielm, led by example and were equipped with shovels. The Polish defenders repelled several Swedish assaults, even making several sorties. Jacob De la Gardie, the aforementioned Grand Marshal of the Realm, was wounded in one of these engagements. During the siege, the commander of the Norrland regiment, Gustav Horn, was also seriously wounded.

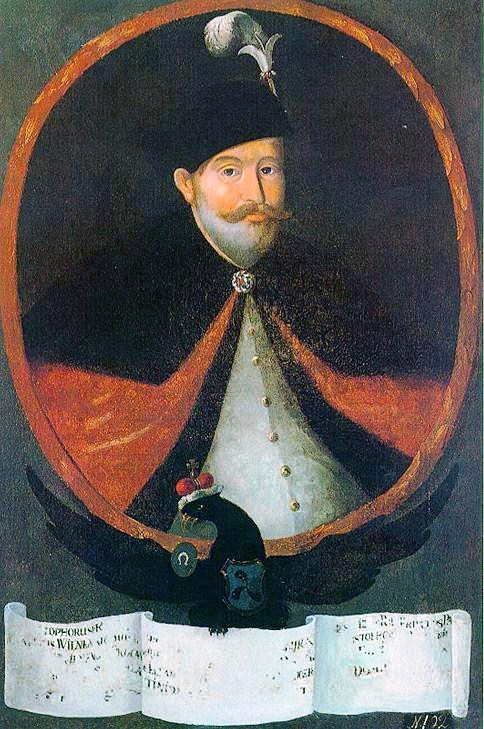
Portrait of Krzysztof Radziwiłł

On 30 August, a glimmer of hope awakened in the city as a Polish relief force consisting of around 1,500 men and 3 cannons under the command of Hetman Krzysztof Radziwill had arrived outside of the city. Radziwill attempted to engage with part of the Swedish besieging army, but the defenders of Riga's hope was quickly shut down as Radziwill was easily repulsed by the more numerous Swedes. Since the Swedes believed that the defenders were close to surrendering, they increased their effort to take the city.

The bombardment of the city was restarted on 2 September. Thousands of Swedes were working on digging tunnels under the walls of the city to be able to destroy important parts of the defensive structures. The defenders also dug tunnels, and occasionally small but bloody skirmishes occurred underground. After the city had once again been asked to surrender, the Swedes decided on 12 September to storm the city. While the Swedes placed straw in their hats, so they could distinguish themselves from the defenders, Gustavus Adolphus was persuaded by his entourage to give the city one last chance. Gustavus was eventually convinced, and sent a trumpeter to the walls. They explained that the Swedish king could not take responsibility for the amounts of blood that would flow if the Swedes were forced to storm the city, and as a result, Riga received a period of 6 hours to deliberate whether or not to surrender.

The city at this point had less than 1,000 defenders remaining, and the continuous bombardment had left a mark. After attempted negotiations, the city capitulated on 15 September.

== Aftermath ==
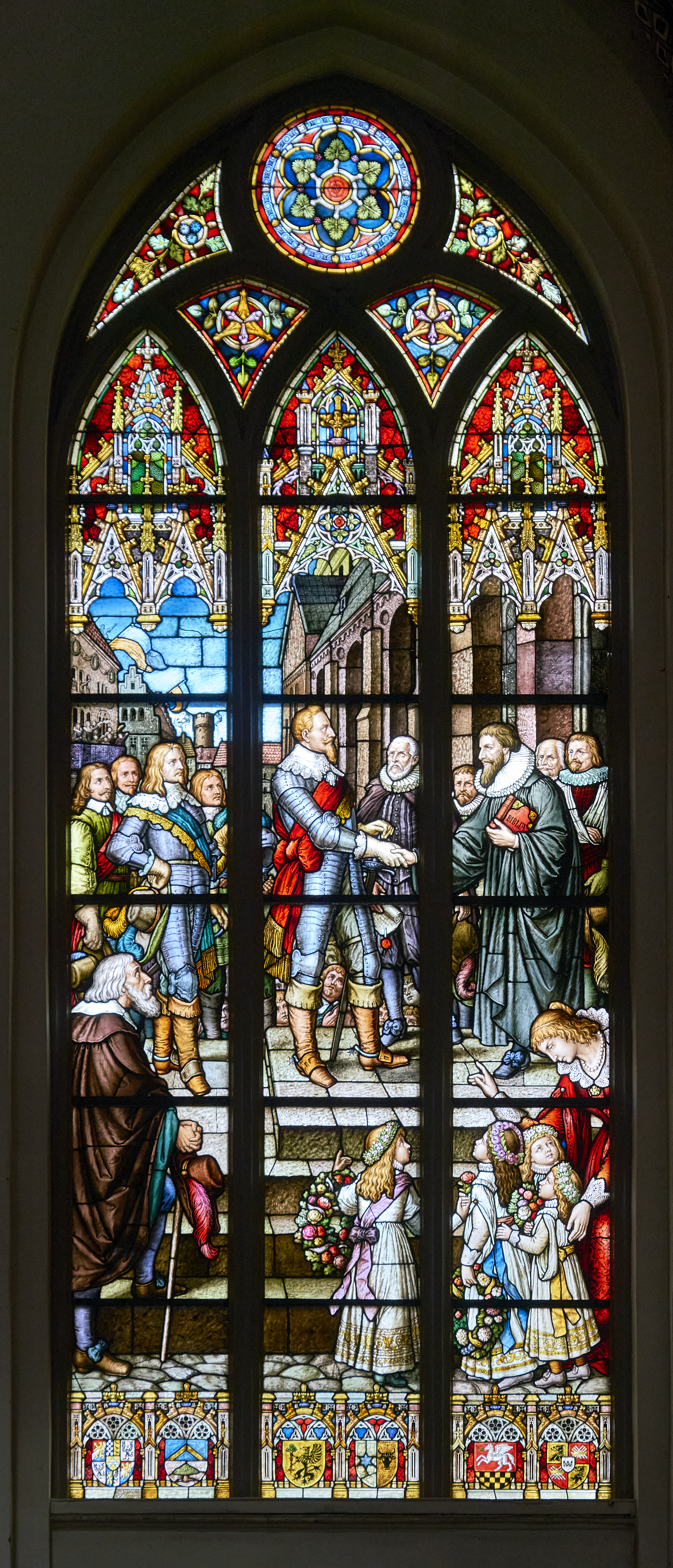
Stained glass window in Riga Cathedral commemorating Gustavus Adolphus' entry into Riga in September 1621

The Swedish conquest of Riga sent shockwaves through Europe, as it was the first time a Protestant leader defeated a Catholic great power. The siege did, however, drain Swedish resources.

Following the conquest, Gustavus slowly occupied most of Livonia, and by the end of the year, he crossed the Daugava and moved his army into Courland, where he took the capital of Mitau in October.

== Works cited ==
- Essen, Michael Fredholm von (2020). The Lion from the North: The Swedish Army During the Thirty Years' War. Helion & Company. pp. 32–34. ISBN 9781804511060.
- Stevens, John L. (1884) [2012]. History of Gustavus Adolphus. New York: Putnam's Sons. ISBN 978-1273068119. Archived from the original on 17 June 2016 – via Questia.
- Sundberg, Ulf (2010). Sveriges krig 1448-1630 [Sweden's wars 1448-1630] (in Swedish). Svenskt militärhistoriskt bibliotek. pp. 306–309. ISBN 9789185789627.
- Sundberg, Ulf (1998). Svenska krig 1521-1814 [Swedish wars 1521-1814] (in Swedish). Stockholm: Hjalmarson & Högberg. pp. 109–110. ISBN 9789189080140.
- Randall, Lorelei (1997). "Ett stycke funnen historia från belägringen av Riga 1621" (PDF). sjohistoriskasamfundet. Sjöhistoriska Samfundet. pp. 21–27.
- Dupuy, Trevor Nevitt (1969). The military life of Gustavus Adolphus, father of modern war. New York, F. Watts. pp. 25–26. ISBN 0531018784.
- Wolke, Lars Ericson (2003). Svenska slagfält [Swedish battlefields] (in Swedish). Wahlström & Widstrand. ISBN 9789146202257.
