= Måseskär =

Lighthouse and island in Sweden

Måseskärs lighthouse Måseskär
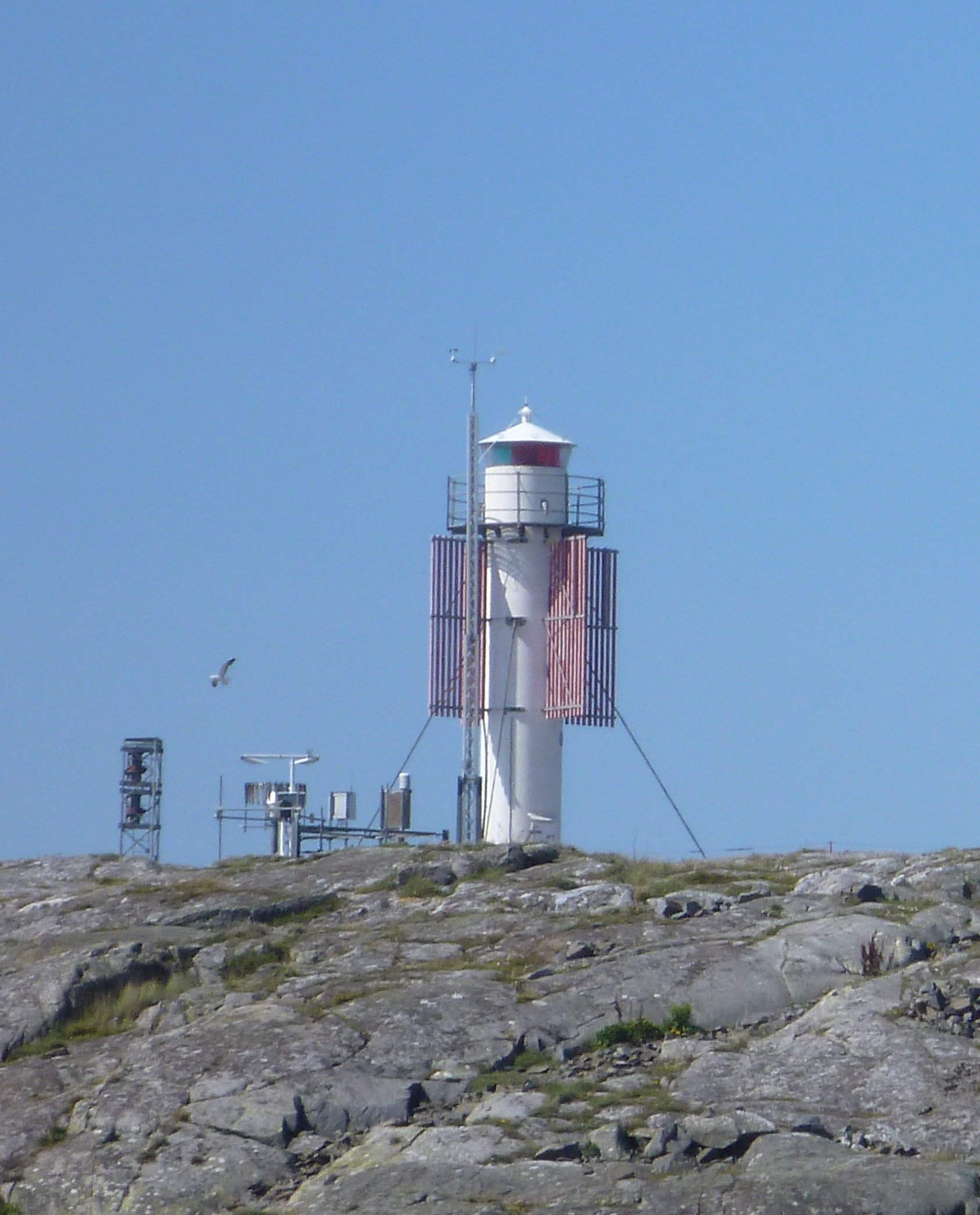
- Location: Måseskär, Orust Municipality, Sweden
- Coordinates: 58°05′38″N 11°19′49″E

Tower
- Constructed: 1978
- Construction: fiberglass
- Height: 13 m (43 ft)
- Shape: cylindrical tower with balcony, lantern and four daymark panels
- Markings: White (tower), red (daymark), white (lantern)
- Power source: electricity
- Operator: Swedish Maritime Administration (Sjöfartsverket)

Light
- First lit: 31 August 1978
- Focal height: 27.5 m (90 ft)
- Lens: 4th order modern lens
- Range: 16 nmi (30 km; 18 mi) (white), 13 nmi (24 km; 15 mi) (red), 12 nmi (22 km; 14 mi) (green)
- Characteristic: Fl(3) WRG 30s
- Sweden no.: SV-8206
- Old lighthouse
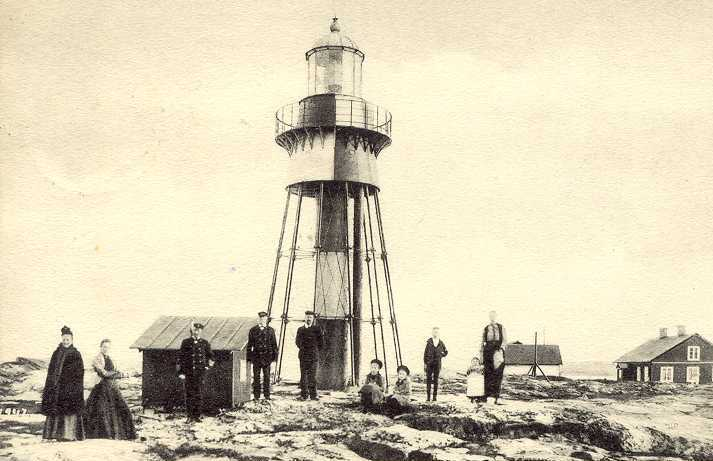
- Old postcard of Måseskär lighthouse
- Constructed: 1865
- Construction: cast iron skeletal tower
- Height: 21.9 m (72 ft)
- Shape: pyramidal skeletal tower with balcony, lantern and central cylinder
- Markings: Red, white (check)
- Power source: rapeseed oil, kerosene, electricity
- Heritage: governmental listed building
- First lit: 8 October 1865
- Deactivated: 31 August 1978
- Focal height: 33.8 m (111 ft)
- Lens: 2nd order Fresnel lens
- Range: 17 nmi (31 km; 20 mi)
- Characteristic: Exting (1978–)

Måseskär (en: The Gull Skerry) is a rocky island and a lighthouse station located in the sea of Skagerrak on the west coast of Sweden.

== History ==
Since the year 1829, a daymark had been constructed on the island, but it proved not to be enough since many ships were lost in the area. It was demolished during the lighthouse construction. The tower was built after sketches from Swedish lighthouse pioneer Nils Gustaf von Heidenstam. Originally the flame ran on colza oil-lamps and showed red light. In 1884 a kerosene lamp was installed instead, and in 1887 the large lens was changed to a third order fresnel lens with white light. The old lens was divided and placed in two other lighthouses. Electricity came to the island in 1950, but the station was staffed until 1997. It was then one of the last staffed light stations in Sweden along with Söderarm and Holmögadd. In 1978 the old lighthouse was replaced, deactivated and planned for scrapping due to its bad rusty condition. But a rescue group convinced the Swedish Maritime Administration to donate the scrap funding and the lighthouse to them for repairs and historic preservation. They created the Måseskär foundation and works to preserve all light station buildings on the island. The modern lighthouse is still under control of the Swedish Maritime Administration. The old lighthouse is intact and fully operable. Since the year 2000 there is a tradition among the foundation to turn on the light at 00.00 January 1 for a couple of minutes. The island is included as a wind observation station in the shipping news of the Swedish Meteorological and Hydrological Institute.

== Climate ==
The weather station operated at Måseskär indicates an oceanic climate that is heavily moderated by Swedish standards. Many typical features of an oceanic climate is there, such as seasonal lag, low diurnal temperature variation rendering cool days and warm nights, and a lower than normal seasonal temperature variation. Although Måseskär has never recorded a temperature above 29.6 °C (85.3 °F) it is a hotspot for tropical nights (minima above 20 °C (68 °F) due to said maritime influence that keeps the sea warm during summer nights. Remarkably high autumn daily means are also common due to the lag effect. For example, the daily means of September and October are on average warmer than the highs of May and April respectively. Summer nights are also some of the warmest in Sweden. During the coldest month (February) frosts are regular, but rarely severe. Months with daytime averaging below freezing are rare but not impossible, only occurring when inland temperatures are very cold.

Rainfall is comparatively low for a Kattegat station, totalling 579.6 millimetres (22.82 in) per year between 1961 and 1990.

Climate data for Måseskär (2005-2020 extremes since 1901)
Month	Jan	Feb	Mar	Apr	May	Jun	Jul	Aug	Sep	Oct	Nov	Dec	Year
Record high °C (°F)	10.2 (50.4)	9.9 (49.8)	14.2 (57.6)	24.3 (75.7)	27.7 (81.9)	29.6 (85.3)	29.5 (85.1)	29.6 (85.3)	26.6 (79.9)	18.0 (64.4)	13.7 (56.7)	11.6 (52.9)	29.6 (85.3)
Mean maximum °C (°F)	7.1 (44.8)	6.0 (42.8)	8.9 (48.0)	14.1 (57.4)	20.6 (69.1)	22.6 (72.7)	24.7 (76.5)	23.9 (75.0)	20.2 (68.4)	15.1 (59.2)	11.5 (52.7)	8.6 (47.5)	25.8 (78.4)
Mean daily maximum °C (°F)	3.6 (38.5)	2.6 (36.7)	4.6 (40.3)	9.1 (48.4)	13.8 (56.8)	17.6 (63.7)	19.9 (67.8)	19.6 (67.3)	16.6 (61.9)	12.2 (54.0)	8.3 (46.9)	5.3 (41.5)	11.1 (52.0)
Daily mean °C (°F)	2.0 (35.6)	1.1 (34.0)	2.8 (37.0)	7.0 (44.6)	11.2 (52.2)	15.4 (59.7)	17.7 (63.9)	17.5 (63.5)	14.7 (58.5)	10.6 (51.1)	6.8 (44.2)	3.7 (38.7)	9.2 (48.6)
Mean daily minimum °C (°F)	0.4 (32.7)	−0.5 (31.1)	1.2 (34.2)	5.0 (41.0)	9.3 (48.7)	13.5 (56.3)	16.1 (61.0)	16.1 (61.0)	13.0 (55.4)	8.6 (47.5)	5.3 (41.5)	2.1 (35.8)	7.5 (45.5)
Mean minimum °C (°F)	−7.2 (19.0)	−6.7 (19.9)	−4.1 (24.6)	0.6 (33.1)	5.0 (41.0)	9.4 (48.9)	13.2 (55.8)	12.2 (54.0)	8.7 (47.7)	3.0 (37.4)	−1.6 (29.1)	−4.3 (24.3)	−9.6 (14.7)
Record low °C (°F)	−25.0 (−13.0)	−19.3 (−2.7)	−18.1 (−0.6)	−8.8 (16.2)	−0.8 (30.6)	5.4 (41.7)	9.0 (48.2)	6.6 (43.9)	3.5 (38.3)	−3.2 (26.2)	−9.3 (15.3)	−19.0 (−2.2)	−25.0 (−13.0)
Average precipitation mm (inches)	41.9 (1.65)	26.7 (1.05)	25.5 (1.00)	36.7 (1.44)	41.0 (1.61)	55.6 (2.19)	61.3 (2.41)	72.3 (2.85)	53.8 (2.12)	66.2 (2.61)	57.2 (2.25)	46.6 (1.83)	584.8 (23.01)
Source 1: SMHI
Source 2: SMHI Monthly Data 2002–2018

== See also ==
- List of lighthouses and lightvessels in Sweden
