= Pater Noster Lighthouse =

Lighthouse in Bohuslän, Sweden

Pater Noster Lighthouse Hamneskär
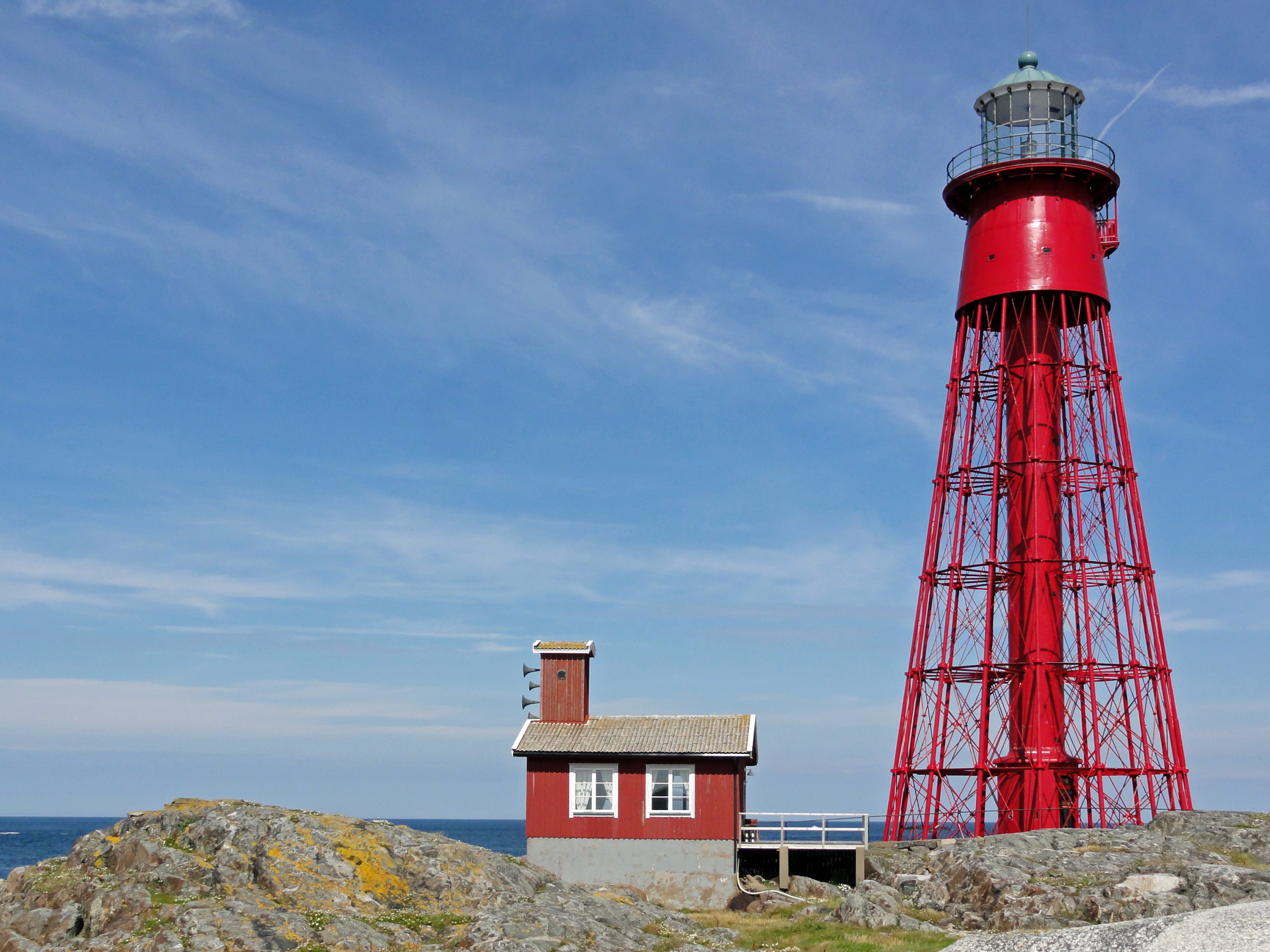
- Pater Noster Lighthouse
- Location: Hamneskär; Skagerrak, west of Marstrand; Sweden
- Coordinates: 57.896041°N 11.465779°E

Tower
- Constructed: 1868
- Foundation: stone basement
- Construction: cast iron skeletal tower
- Automated: 1964
- Height: 32 m (105 ft)
- Shape: conical skeletal tower with balcony, lantern, observation room and central cylinder
- Markings: red tower, greenish lantern roof
- Power source: rapeseed oil, kerosene, diesel generator, electricity
- Heritage: governmental listed building complex, governmental listed building

Light
- Deactivated: 1977-2007
- Focal height: 36 m (118 ft)
- Lens: 1st order Fresnel lens (original), small lens (current)
- Range: 20 nmi (37 km; 23 mi)
- Characteristic: LFl W 15s.
- Sweden no.: SV-7925.01

Pater Noster is a Swedish lighthouse and the name of a small archipelago in Bohuslän on the Swedish west coast.

== History ==
There were plans to build a lighthouse on the island in the 1750s, but a light was instead placed on the fortification of Carlsten in Marstrand. That light was replaced by Pater Noster in 1868. The lighthouse is of engineer Nils Gustaf von Heidenstam's typical iron design.

Pater Noster originally had a large first order Fresnel lens in its lantern and the flame originally ran on colza oil. A paraffin lamp was installed in 1887. The lighthouse was automated in 1964 and the large lens replaced by a small 4th order lens. In 1977 Pater Noster lighthouse was deactivated in favor of the modern lighthouse Hätteberget placed in open water. Pater Noster started to fall out of repair as the salt water made the iron construction rusty and weak.

== Restoration ==
In 2002, a large restoration project began. The lighthouse was transported to the town of Uddevalla, and later to Gothenburg. The tower was very rusty and overall in bad condition; consequently, restoration took much longer than originally planned, mostly because of insufficient funding. But many local companies and persons volunteered to complete the work. In the summer of 2007, the lighthouse was shipped back to Hamneskär. In the autumn it was reactivated.

In 2015, the lens room was renovated and equipped with a high standard kitchen by the furniture design company Marbodal, as a part of their PR-campaign.

In 2020 during the pandemic, a lottery called "The Isolated Cinema" was announced by the Gothenburg Film Festival, with the prize of visiting the lighthouse for looking at movie premieres for one person alone in the lens room the whole festival week. The lottery got worldwide attention, with over 12,000 attenders from more than 45 countries. The winner was an emergency nurse from Sweden.

Also in 2020, the accommodation of the previous lighthouse keepers was renovated and since then, a hotel and conference centre named "Ett Hem vid Horisonten" (transl. 'A Home on the Horizon') is kept in the building. The business has become internationally famous and in 2022, the hotel won the eminent Global New Concept Award by AHEAD Awards that year.

== Gallery ==
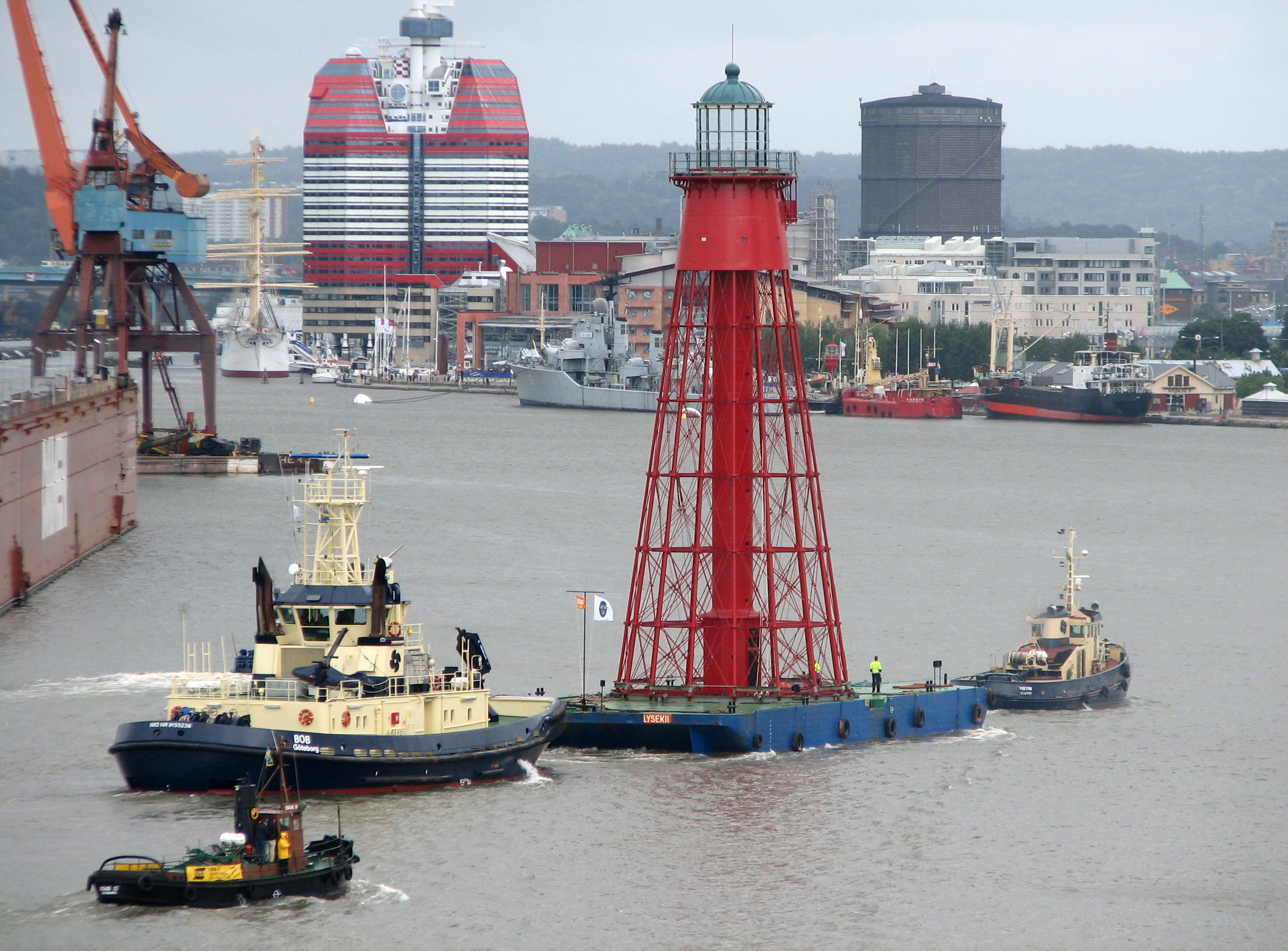
The lighthouse is shipped after renovation on Arendals wharf, Gothenburg.

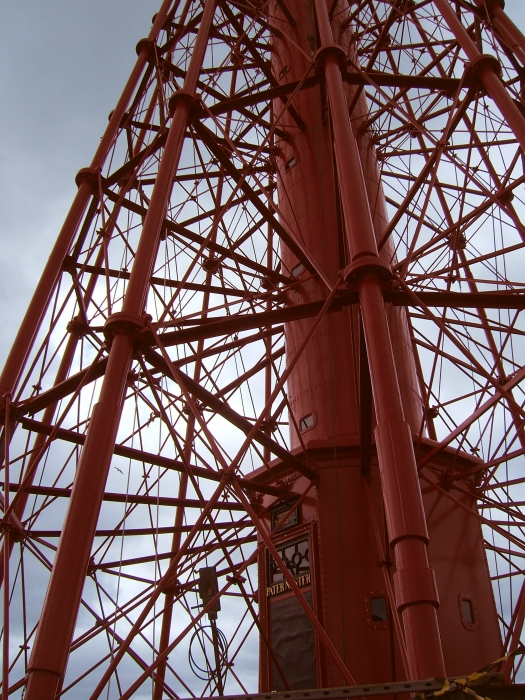

== See also ==
- List of lighthouses and lightvessels in Sweden

== Bibliography ==
- Rowlett, Russ. "Lighthouses of Sweden: Göteborg Area". The Lighthouse Directory. University of North Carolina at Chapel Hill.
- "Swedish Lighthouse Society". Archived from the original on March 14, 2012.
