= Pite-Rönnskär =

Pite-Rönnskär lighthouse Pite-Rönnskär
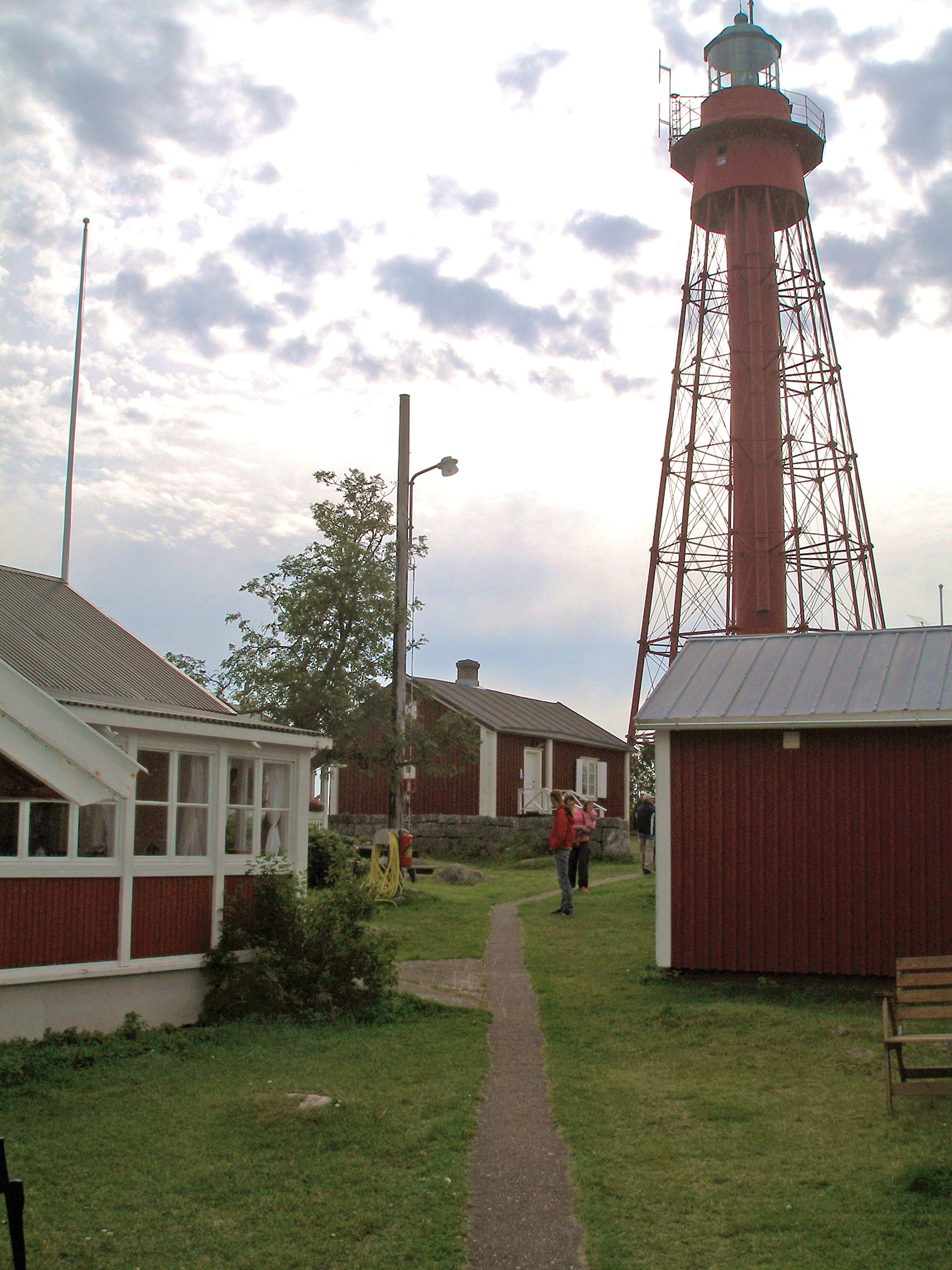
- Location: Pite-Rönnskär, Skellefteå Municipality, Sweden
- Coordinates: 65°02′07″N 21°33′27″E

Tower
- Constructed: 1880
- Construction: cast iron skeletal tower
- Automated: 1959
- Height: 37 m (121 ft)
- Shape: conical skeletal tower with central cylinder, balcony and lantern
- Markings: red tower, greenish lantern roof
- Power source: kerosene, acetylene, electricity

Light
- First lit: 1905 (tower built in 1862 relocated in 1905 from Sandhammaren)
- Deactivated: 1958-2005
- Focal height: 39 m (128 ft)
- Lens: 3rd order Fresnel lens (1905)
- Range: 17 nmi (31 km; 20 mi)
- Characteristic: Fl(3) W 15s (occas) (2005–)
- Sweden no.: SV-0470.1

Pite-Rönnskär is a Swedish island with a lighthouse station located in the Bothnian Bay. The island is located at the border between the provinces of Västerbotten and Norrbotten but belongs to Skellefteå Municipality. The island was a well known fishing village for many years and contains a chapel dating from 1771. In 1821 a pilot station was located on the island. Today the fishing cabins on the island are used as summer residences. The island has a weather station, and wind observations from it are reported by the Swedish Meteorological and Hydrological Institute in their shipping forecast.

== Lighthouse ==
The first lighthouse on the island was lit in 1880. It was built on the gable of a keeper's house and carried a kerosene lamp. In 1905 the current lighthouse was constructed on the island. It was first built in 1862 as one of two lighthouses at the Sandhammaren light station in Scania. When it was relocated the current fresnel lens and a gas mantle light was installed. It was replaced with a Dalén light in 1944 and in 1959 it was electrified. In 1972 the lighthouse was deactivated as The Swedish Maritime Administration found that the modern lighthouse Nygrån (built 1959) placed in open water was enough to provide sea safety. Nygrån was partly destroyed by ice in 1969-1971 and during this years Pite-Rönnskär was the main lighthouse in the area.

In August 2005 the lighthouse was reactivated as an Occas-light by local summer residents on the island. The light shows the original character with three white flashes each 15th second and uses the original lens. It is owned by the city of Skellefteå. The lighthouse is the highest of the "Heidenstam lights".

== See also ==
- List of lighthouses and lightvessels in Sweden
