= Sandhammaren =

Sandhammaren lighthouse Sandhammaren
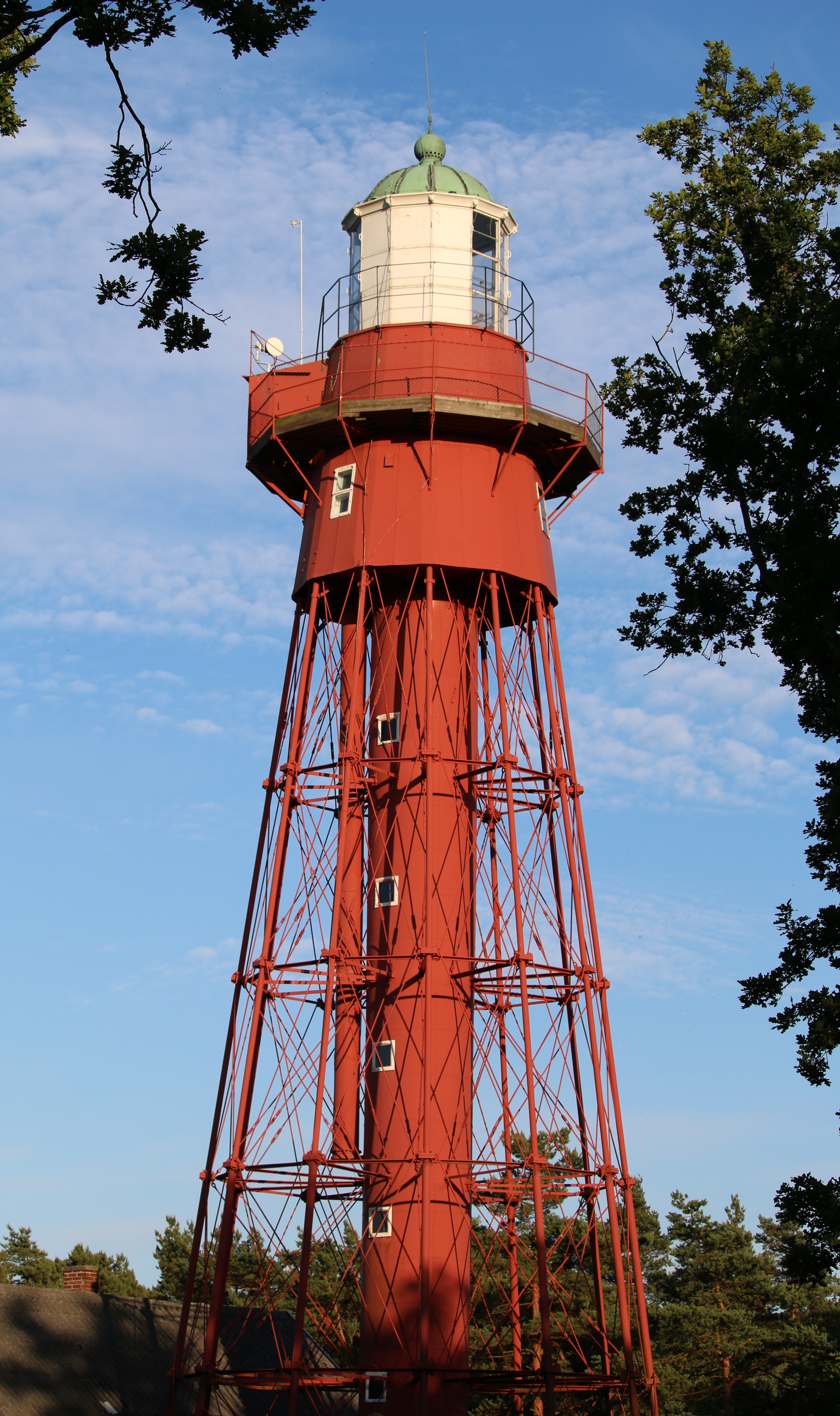
- Location: Sandhammaren, Ystad Municipality, Sweden
- Coordinates: 55.386746°N 14.193058°E

Tower
- Constructed: 1862
- Construction: cast iron skeletal tower
- Automated: 1976
- Height: 29.5 metres (97 ft)
- Shape: conical skeletal tower with central cylinder, balcony and lantern
- Markings: red tower, greenish lantern dome
- Power source: rapeseed oil, kerosene, electricity
- Operator: Swedish Maritime Administration (Sjöfartsverket)
- Heritage: governmental listed building complex, governmental listed building

Light
- Focal height: 32 metres (105 ft)
- Lens: 2° Focal plane lens
- Range: 22 nautical miles (41 km; 25 mi)
- Characteristic: Fl W 5s.
- Sweden no.: SV-6545

Sandhammaren is a Swedish lighthouse, and the name of both a beach and a point east of Ystad in Scania. At first two identical lighthouses were constructed, because it was a risk to mistake this lighthouse with the one on Ertholmene. The flame first ran on colza oil. Later on (1891), one of the lighthouses was put out of service and moved to Pite-Rönnskär in Norrland, at the same time the lamp was transformed to a paraffin lamp. The lighthouse was electrified in 1952.

The Swedish Maritime Administration owns and runs the lighthouse.

== See also ==
- List of lighthouses and lightvessels in Sweden
