= Herman Wrangel =

Swedish military officer (1584/1587–1643)

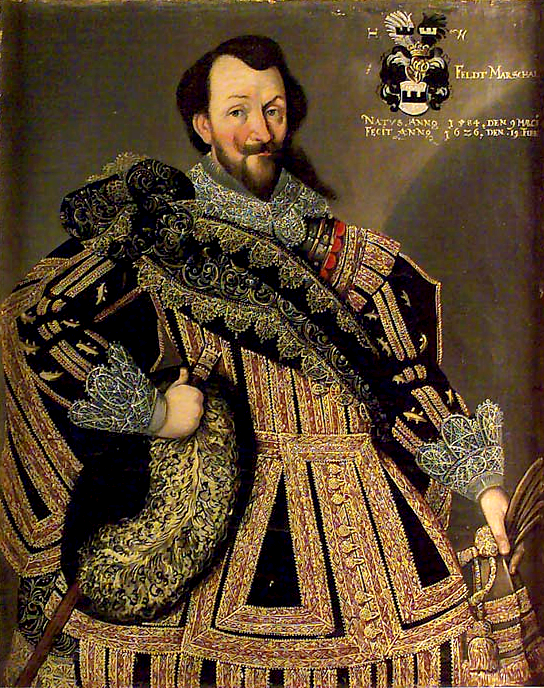
Portrait by Georg Günther Kräill von Bemeberg, 1626

Herman Wrangel (born 1584/1587 – 10 December 1643) was a Swedish military officer and statesman of Baltic German extraction.

== Biography ==
Herman von Wrangel was born in Duchy of Estonia . He came to Sweden around 1608. In 1612, he participated in the Kalmar War against Denmark. In 1619, Wrangel was commander of Älvsborg fortress. He was appointed Field Marshal in 1621, Privy Councillor in 1630, and Governor General of Swedish Livonia in 1643.

Wrangel was married three times. In 1636, he married Amalie of Nassau-Siegen, daughter of John VII, Count of Nassau-Siegen. He was the father of statesman and military commander Carl Gustaf von Wrangel (1613–1676).

== See also ==
- Wrangel family
- Polish-Swedish War

== Other Sources ==
- Wrangel, 1. Herman, "Nordisk familjebok" (2nd edition, 1921)
