= Svenska Högarna =

Lighthouse and island group in Sweden

Svenska Högarna lighthouse Svenska Högarna
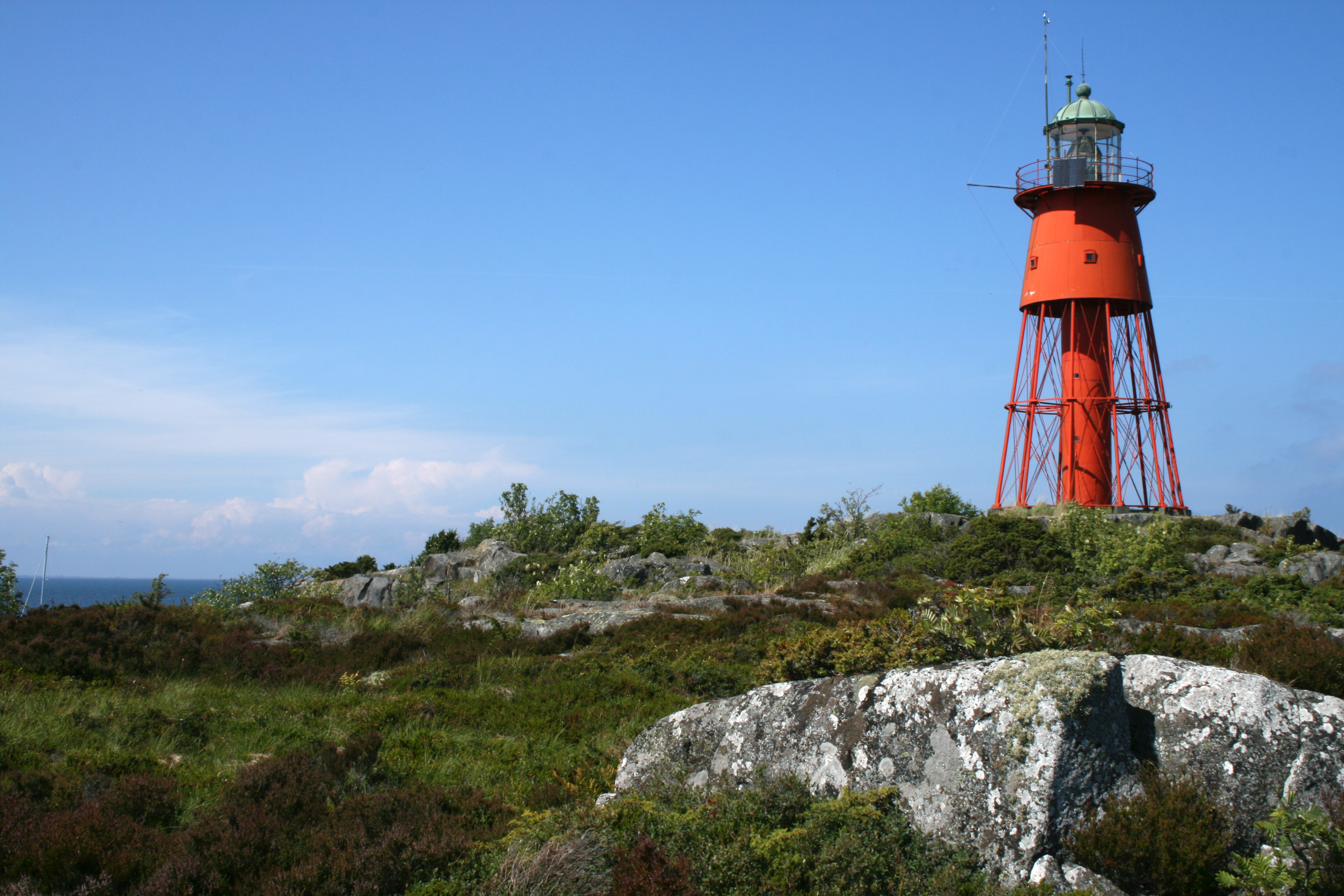
- Svenska Högarna lighthouse
- Location: Svenska Högarna; Stockholm Archipelago; Sweden
- Coordinates: 59.443807°N 19.501813°E

Tower
- Constructed: 1874
- Foundation: stone
- Construction: cast iron tower
- Automated: 1966
- Height: 18 metres (59 ft)
- Shape: conical skeletal tower with central cylinder, observation room. balcony and lantern
- Markings: red tower, greenish metallic lantern dome
- Power source: rapeseed oil, kerosene, diesel generator, acetylene, solar cell panel
- Operator: Swedish Maritime Administration (Sjöfartsverket)

Light
- First lit: 1 November 1874
- Focal height: 31 metres (102 ft)
- Lens: 2nd order Fresnel lens (original), 4th order lens (current)
- Range: 15 nautical miles (28 km; 17 mi)
- Characteristic: LFl W 15s.
- Sweden no.: SV-2800

Location east of Stockholm

Svenska Högarna (English: Swedish Hillocks) is a small group of islands and a lighthouse located east of Möja in the Stockholm archipelago.

== History ==
The lighthouse is located on the largest island Storön, and is the only lighthouse in Stockholm archipelago with the classic iron design of architect Nils Gustaf von Heidenstam. Before the lighthouse was built there had been a checkered day beacon on the island, it is now located at the island of Storkläppen in Östergötland. Svenska Högarna lighthouse was lit in 1874 with a colza oil lamp. In 1887 a paraffin lamp was installed, in 1966 it was electrified and in 1986 solar cells were put in use to generate power.

The island is staffed with a weather station. It is frequently reported as a wind observation station in the Shipping Forecast of the Swedish Meteorological and Hydrological Institute. Since 1994 the lighthouse is owned by a foundation called "Edward Sjöbloms stiftelse". All of the islands are a nature reserve with sparse vegetation. On the islands you can also observe two giant's kettles. There is no scheduled traffic to Svenska Högarna. Access is by own boat or taxiboat. The isolated islands are not easy to reach: the weather must be very calm in order to moor boats safely to the rocky shores.

== Climate ==
Svenska Högarna has a humid continental climate under the 0 °C isotherm, and an oceanic climate in the -3 °C isotherm with low diurnal temperature variation, windy and mild conditions. Summer highs are cool, whilst winter lows remain very mild, with some years barely having a meteorological winter. The climate has a significant seasonal lag, with temperature extremes often being two months after maximum and minimum insolation. The climate is relatively dry in terms of rain and snowfall, but retains a high humidity. In spite of its isolated position, the climate has semi-continental characteristics, with significant differences between seasons for such an isolated island.

Climate data for Svenska Högarna (2002–2018; sunshine 2007–2018; extremes since 1901)
Month	Jan	Feb	Mar	Apr	May	Jun	Jul	Aug	Sep	Oct	Nov	Dec	Year
Record high °C (°F)	8.4 (47.1)	8.1 (46.6)	11.0 (51.8)	15.7 (60.3)	23.2 (73.8)	26.0 (78.8)	28.5 (83.3)	29.3 (84.7)	22.8 (73.0)	16.6 (61.9)	11.9 (53.4)	9.9 (49.8)	29.3 (84.7)
Mean maximum °C (°F)	5.1 (41.2)	4.5 (40.1)	7.5 (45.5)	11.4 (52.5)	16.8 (62.2)	21.4 (70.5)	24.8 (76.6)	24.4 (75.9)	19.6 (67.3)	14.4 (57.9)	9.4 (48.9)	6.6 (43.9)	25.6 (78.1)
Mean daily maximum °C (°F)	1.2 (34.2)	0.7 (33.3)	2.6 (36.7)	6.4 (43.5)	11.1 (52.0)	15.9 (60.6)	20.4 (68.7)	20.2 (68.4)	15.7 (60.3)	10.0 (50.0)	6.1 (43.0)	3.5 (38.3)	9.5 (49.1)
Daily mean °C (°F)	−0.2 (31.6)	−0.7 (30.7)	0.9 (33.6)	4.2 (39.6)	8.6 (47.5)	13.4 (56.1)	18.0 (64.4)	18.0 (64.4)	13.9 (57.0)	8.5 (47.3)	4.8 (40.6)	2.1 (35.8)	7.6 (45.7)
Mean daily minimum °C (°F)	−1.6 (29.1)	−2.1 (28.2)	−0.8 (30.6)	1.9 (35.4)	6.1 (43.0)	10.8 (51.4)	15.6 (60.1)	15.7 (60.3)	12.0 (53.6)	7.0 (44.6)	3.5 (38.3)	0.6 (33.1)	5.7 (42.3)
Mean minimum °C (°F)	−7.1 (19.2)	−7.7 (18.1)	−5.0 (23.0)	−0.8 (30.6)	2.5 (36.5)	7.2 (45.0)	12.3 (54.1)	12.3 (54.1)	7.8 (46.0)	2.1 (35.8)	−1.5 (29.3)	−4.1 (24.6)	−9.8 (14.4)
Record low °C (°F)	−24.6 (−12.3)	−23.4 (−10.1)	−24.0 (−11.2)	−15.3 (4.5)	−1.9 (28.6)	3.0 (37.4)	7.2 (45.0)	8.0 (46.4)	2.9 (37.2)	−2.7 (27.1)	−9.0 (15.8)	−14.8 (5.4)	−24.6 (−12.3)
Average precipitation mm (inches)	37.6 (1.48)	26.7 (1.05)	20.4 (0.80)	19.8 (0.78)	30.4 (1.20)	42.2 (1.66)	36.7 (1.44)	52.5 (2.07)	36.9 (1.45)	44.9 (1.77)	46.1 (1.81)	44.7 (1.76)	438.9 (17.27)
Mean monthly sunshine hours	35.3	65.3	170.2	246.2	322.3	322.5	330.7	280.5	197.0	114.4	51.5	33.8	2,169.7
Source 1: SMHI
Source 2: SMHI Monthly Data 2002-2015

== Gallery ==
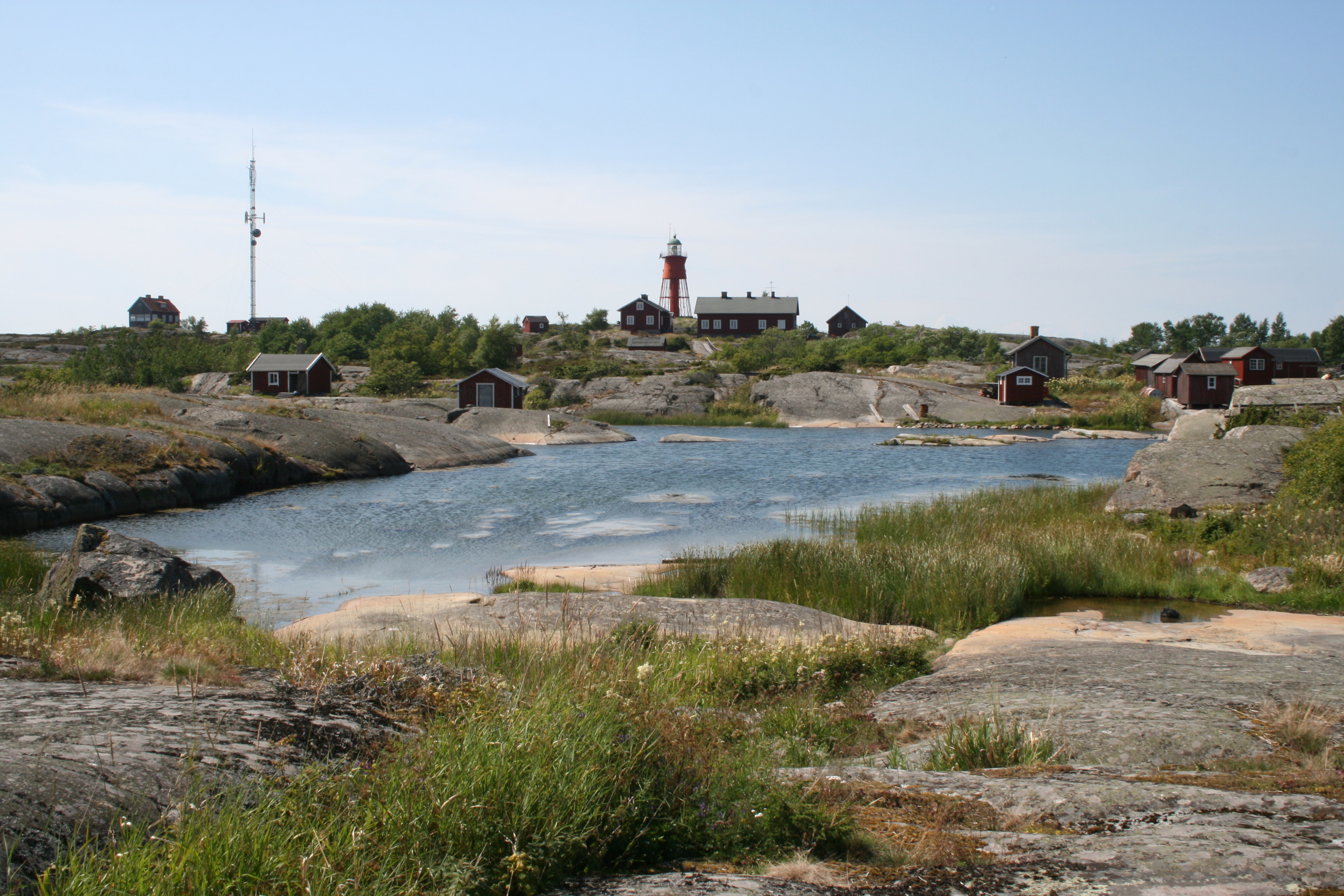

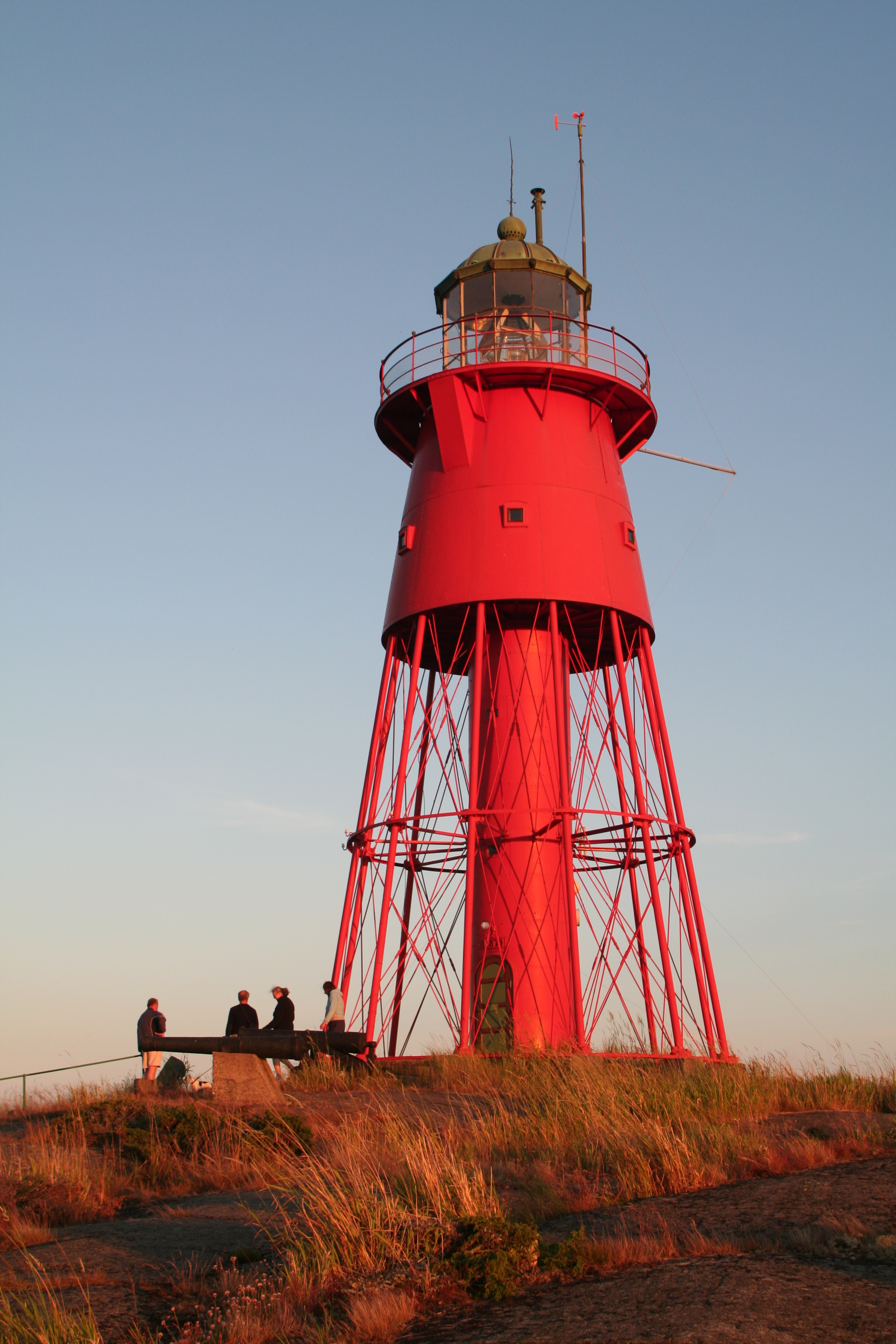

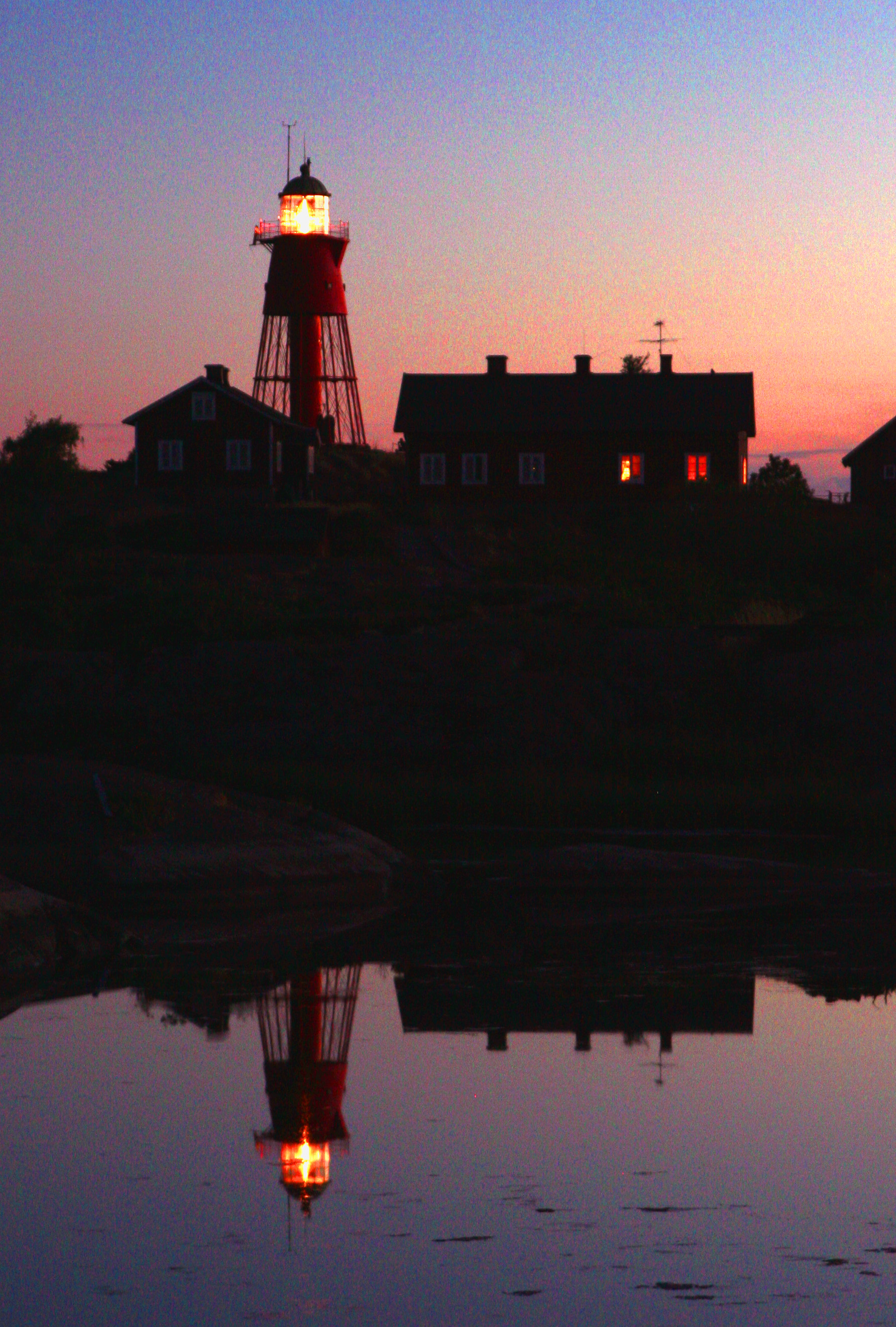

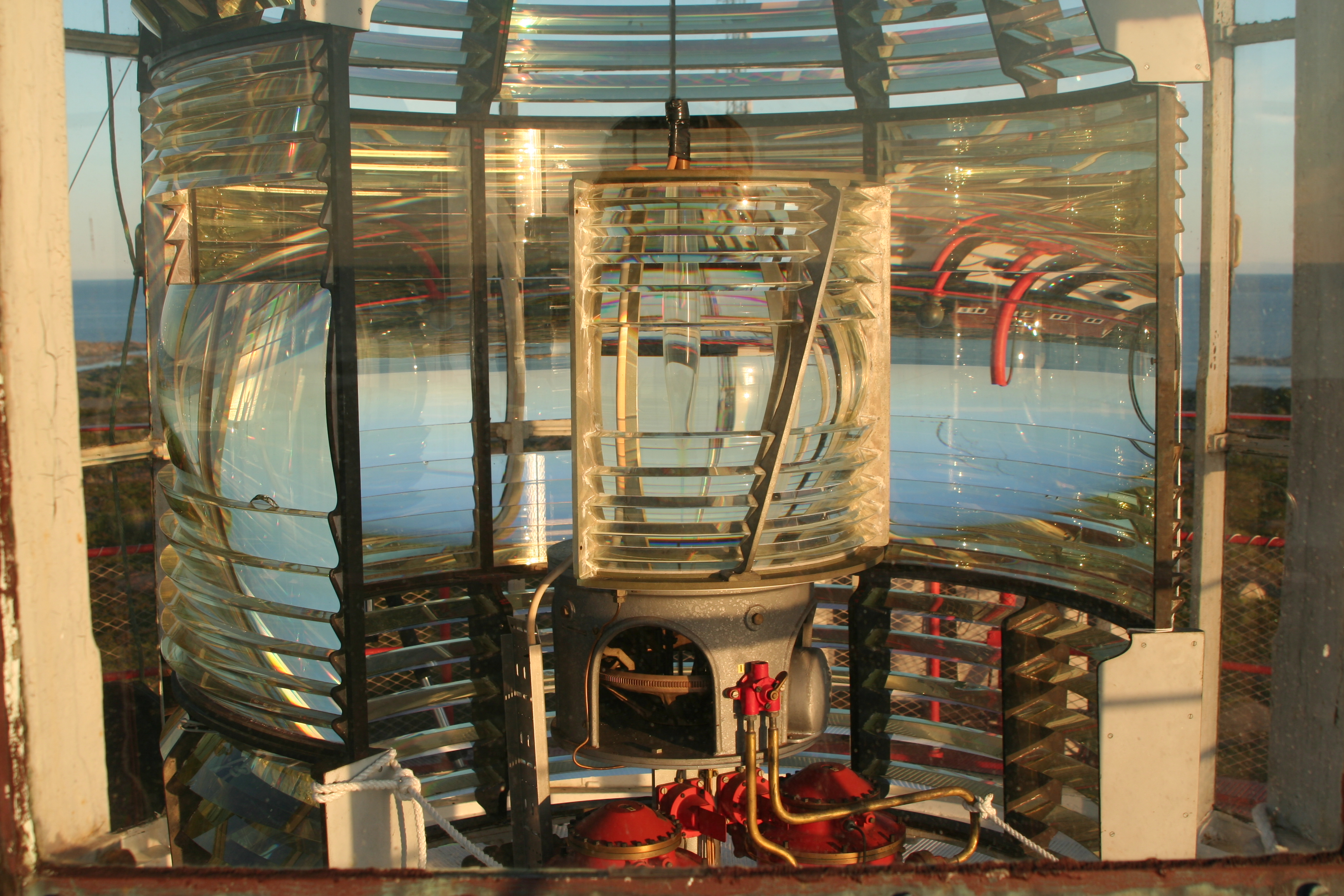

== See also ==
- List of lighthouses and lightvessels in Sweden
