= Väderöarna =

Archipelago in Sweden

Nickname: The Weather Islands
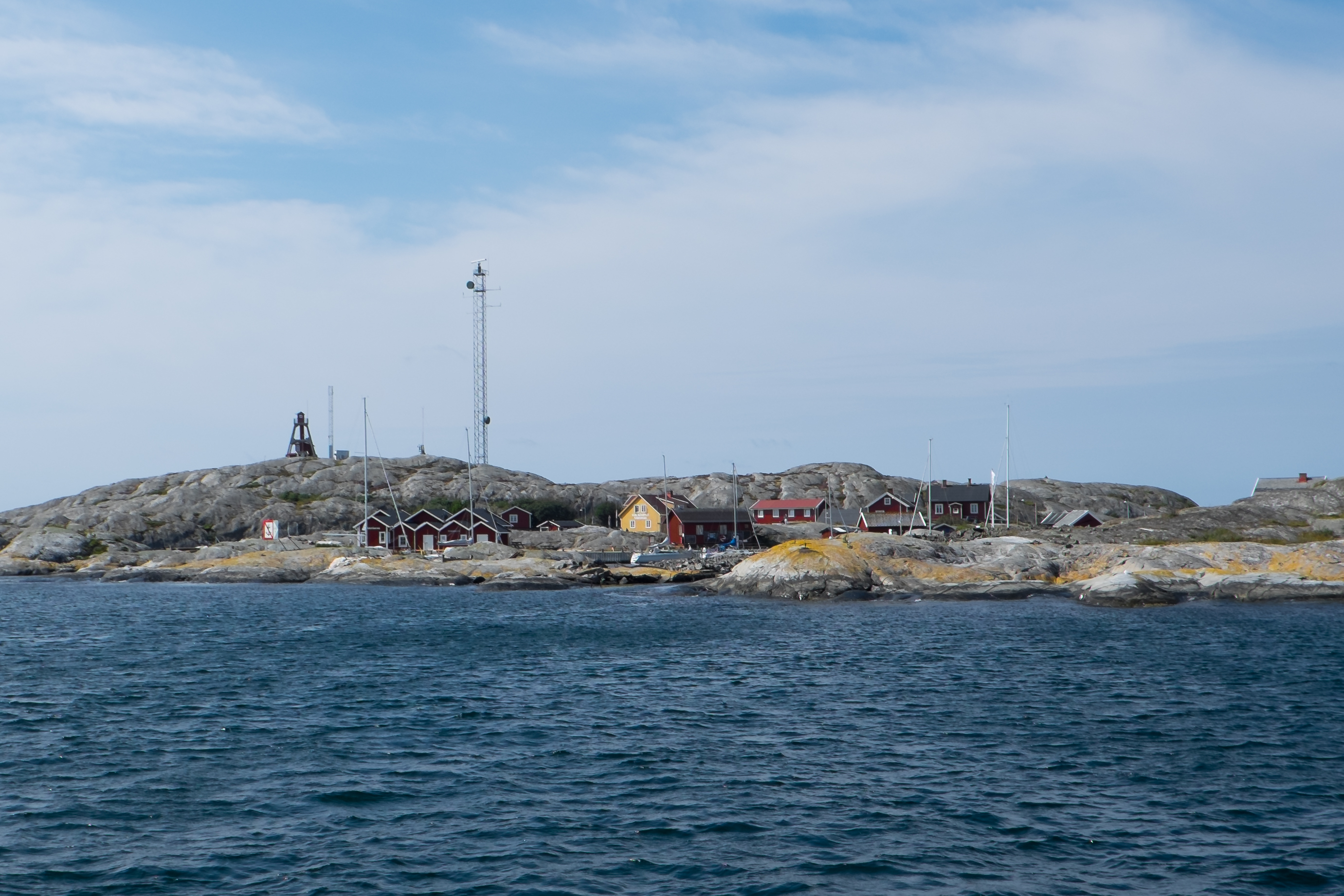
- Hamnen Väderöbod, Väderöarna, Bohuslän

- Location within Sweden

Geography
- Location: Skagerrak
- Coordinates: 58°34′N 11°03′E
- Archipelago: Väderöarna Islands
- Adjacent to: North Sea
- Total islands: hundreds

Administration
- Sweden

Väderöarna (or the Weather Islands) is an archipelago in western Sweden, near Hamburgsund.

== Geography ==
The islands are located in the Skagerrak near the North Sea. Many are small, hilly, and roadless.

== Wildlife ==
There is a large colony of harbour seals living on the islands.

The archipelago has been designated an Important Bird Area (IBA) by BirdLife International because it supports significant colonies of great black-backed gulls and black guillemots as well as wintering purple sandpipers.

== Access ==
The Väderöarnas are accessible by a 30-minute boat ride from Fjällbacka. There is limited accommodation on the islands. Lighthouses on the islands are also available for rent.
