= History of lighthouses =

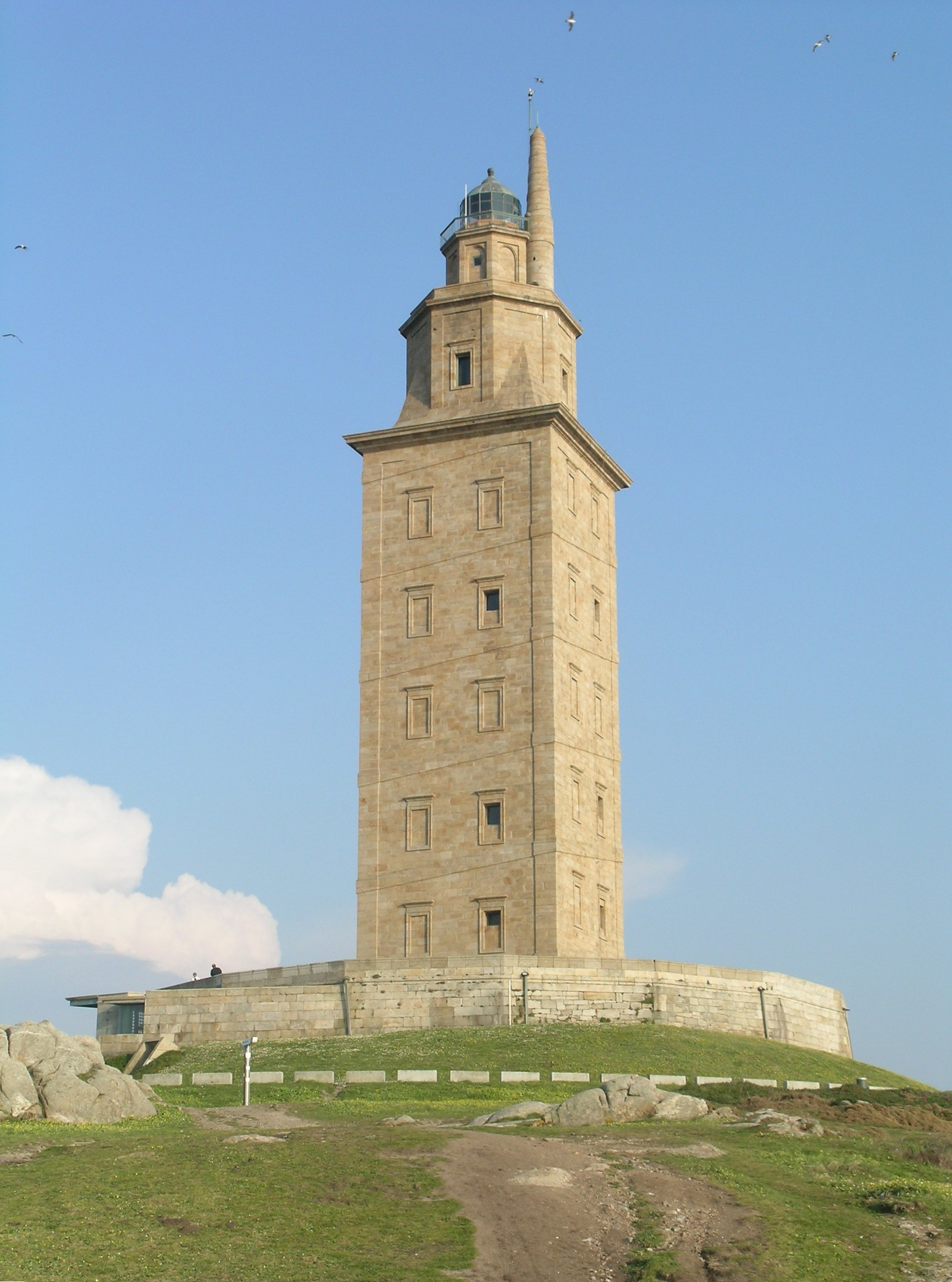
The Tower of Hercules, a lighthouse of Roman origin at A Coruña in northwest Spain, modelled on the Pharos of Alexandria

The history of lighthouses refers to the development of the use of towers, buildings, or other types of structures as an aid to navigation for maritime pilots at sea or on inland waterways.

== Premodern era ==
Before the development of clearly defined ports, mariners were guided by fires built on hilltops. Since raising the fire would improve visibility, placing the fire on a platform became a practice that led to the development of the lighthouse. In antiquity, the lighthouse functioned more as an entrance marker to ports than as a warning signal for reefs and promontories, unlike many modern lighthouses. Excavation at Kuntasi on the coast of India has revealed a square watch tower with a ramp which would have originally been 10–12 meters, used to guide boats coming to Kuntasi from Rann of Kutch. The possibility of it being a lighthouse cannot be ruled out. If so, the lighthouse would date from about 2000 BCE.

=== Greek-Roman period ===
According to Homeric legend, Palamedes of Nafplio invented the first lighthouse, although they are certainly attested with the Lighthouse of Alexandria (designed and constructed by Sostratus of Cnidus) and the Colossus of Rhodes. However, Themistocles had earlier established a lighthouse at the harbour of Piraeus connected to Athens in the 5th century BC, essentially a small stone column with a fire beacon.

Lesches, a Greek poet (c. 660 BC), mentions a lighthouse at Sigeion in the Troad. This appears to have been the first light regularly maintained for the guidance of mariners.

Written descriptions and drawings of the Pharos of Alexandria provide information about lighthouses, but the tower itself collapsed during an earthquake many centuries after its construction in the 3rd century BC by the Greeks. The Tower of Hercules at A Coruña in Spain has a Roman core, and the ruins of the Dover lighthouse in England give insight into its construction; other evidence about lighthouses exists in depictions on coins and mosaics, of which many represent the lighthouse at Ostia. Coins from Alexandria, Ostia, and Laodicea in Syria also exist.

While the evidence provides insight into the exterior structure of these structures, there are many gaps in the evidence concerning less visible aspects of the structures. The remains at A Coruña and Dover help determine how each lighthouse structure functioned, though one must make some assumptions to determine how the structures beacons were illuminated. Presumably locally available fuels will have included wood and probably coal to keep a fire going continuously during the night, and there is a large chimney leading to the top room at the Tower of Hercules. The example from Dover has been converted at some stage into a simple bell tower for the adjoining church.

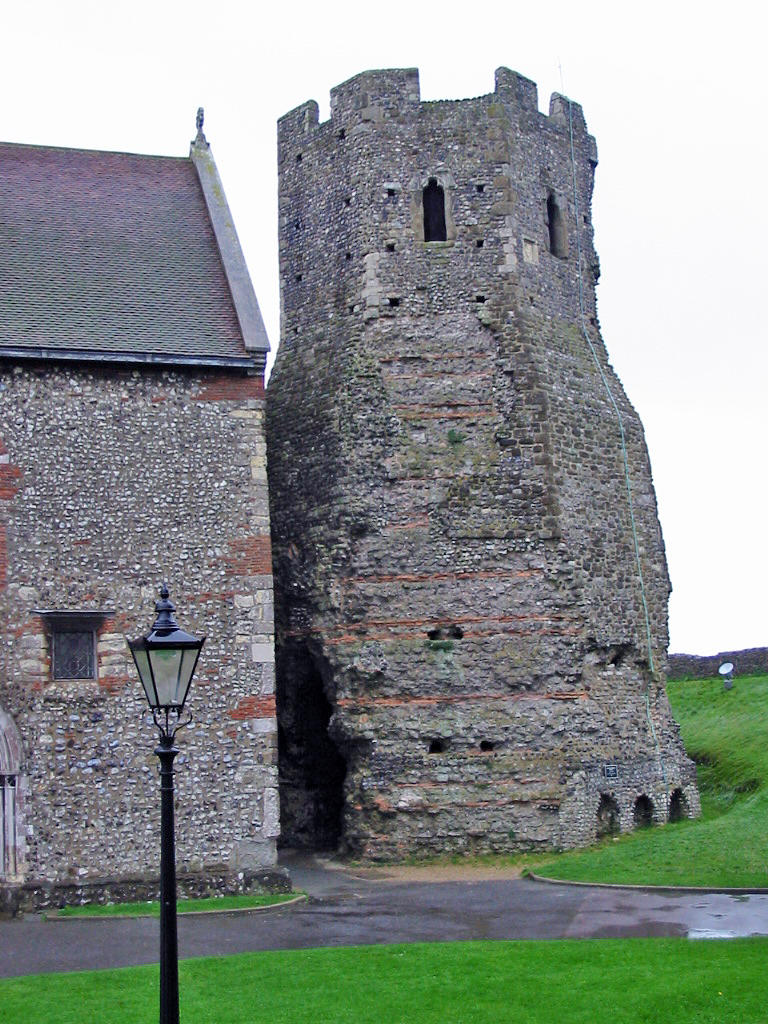
The surviving Roman lighthouse at Dover Castle in Kent, overlooking the English Channel. The Tour d'Ordre, its French counterpart, fell into the sea in 1644 after 1600 years.

Lighthouse keepers may have added combustible liquids to reduce the expenditure on fuel and keep the light steady during gales, but little information exists in the literature from the time. It may also be possible that the light was protected from the wind by glass windows, and large mirrors may have assisted in projecting the light beam as far as possible. It is likely that lighthouses would have required considerable labour for transporting the fuel and maintaining the flame. At Cape Hatteras in the 1870s, one keeper and two assistants kept themselves busy by tending more sophisticated flames from powerful oil lamps.

While artistic representations assist us in re-creating a visual image of lighthouses, they present many problems. Depictions of lighthouses on Roman coins, inscriptions, carvings, and mosaics present an inconsistent view of the actual appearance of the structures. Most show a building with two or three stories that decreases in width as it ascends. The limited size of coins could cause the producer of the coin to alter the image to fit on the surface. The similarity in depictions of lighthouses is symbolic rather than accurate representations of specific beacons.

=== Europe ===
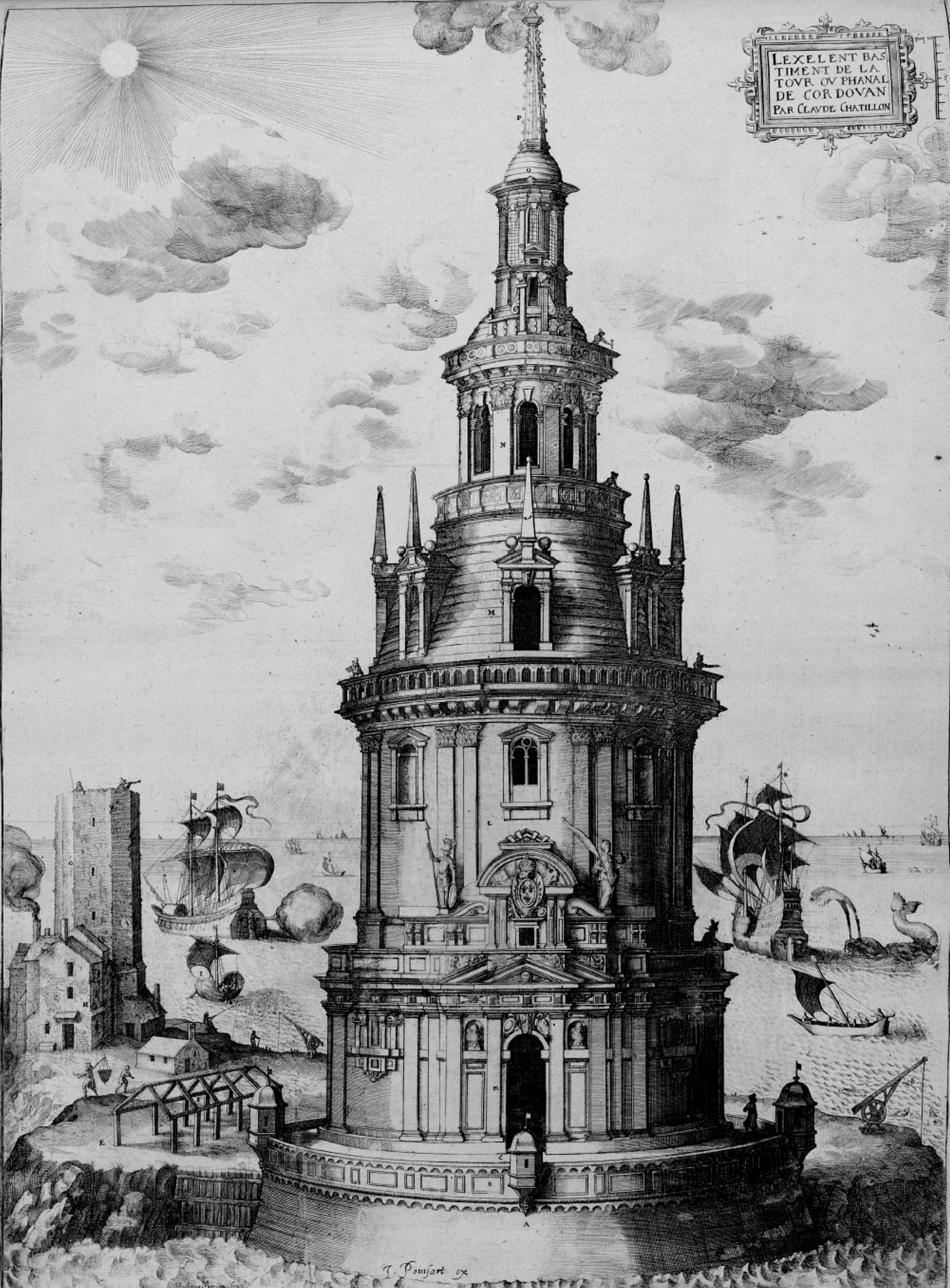
Engraving of the Cordouan lighthouse, completed in 1611

During the European Middle Ages, many Roman lighthouses fell into disuse. Some did remain functional, such as the Farum Brigantium, now known as the Tower of Hercules, in A Coruña, Spain, and others in the Mediterranean Sea, such as the Lanterna at Genoa. As navigation improved, lighthouses gradually expanded into Western and Northern Europe. One of the oldest working lighthouses in Europe is Hook Lighthouse, located at Hook Head in County Wexford, Ireland. It was built during the Middle Ages in a sturdy, circular design.

A century later, in the Late Middle Ages, a 40-foot (12 m) tower was built by Edward the Black Prince at Cordouan near the Gironde estuary. One hundred years later, in 1581, Henri III asked architect Louis de Foix to build a new one. Building the lighthouse took twenty-seven years and was finally completed in 1611. The tiered Cordouan symbolized French maritime power and prestige. The interior had sumptuous king's apartments, decorated pillars, and murals. Its upper level was rebuilt between 1780 and 1790, increasing the height from 49m to 60m and incorporating an Argand lamp and one of the first parabolic mirrors which was turned by clockwork developed by a clockmaker in Dieppe. The tower later became the first to use the revolutionary Fresnel lens, in the early 1820s.)

In Britain, lighthouses were privately owned, and the right to collect dues was by warrant, either from a local authority or the crown. The abuse of these licenses led to foreign ships fearing to seek refuge on the south coast of England for fear of being boarded with demands and to the loss of a number of ships, most notably the Dutch merchant ship Vreede in 1802 with the loss of 380 lives.

With the increasing number of ships lost along the Newcastle to London coal route, Trinity House established the Lowestoft Lighthouse in 1609, a pair of wooden towers with candle illuminants. Until the late 18th century, candle, coal, or wood fires were used as lighthouse illuminants. This was improved in 1782 with the circular-wick oil-burning Argand lamp, the first ‘catoptric’ mirrored reflector in 1777, and Fresnel’s ‘dioptric’ lens system in 1823. The Nore lightship was established as the world's first floating light in 1732.

After the reforms of the Lighthouse Act 1836, by which Trinity House accepted powers to levy out the last private lighthouse owners and began refurbishing and upgrading its lighthouse estate, owners still managed to collect large dues, of which the largest were for the Smalls Lighthouse, which collected £23,000 in 1852, and Trinity House was forced to spend over £1m in buying back leases, including £444,000 for the Skerries Lighthouse.

== Modern lighthouses ==
=== Construction ===
The modern era of lighthouses began at the turn of the 18th century, as lighthouse construction boomed in lockstep with burgeoning levels of transatlantic commerce. Advances in structural engineering and new and efficient lighting equipment allowed for the creation of larger and more powerful lighthouses, including ones exposed to the sea. The function of lighthouses shifted toward the provision of a visible warning against shipping hazards, such as rocks or reefs.

==== Eddystone lighthouse ====
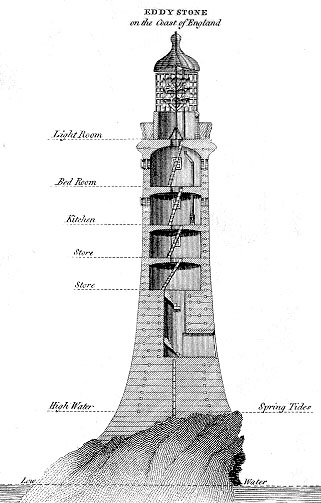
John Smeaton's rebuilt version of the Eddystone Lighthouse, 1759. This represented a great step forward in lighthouse design.

The Eddystone Rocks, an extensive reef near Plymouth Sound, England, and one of the major shipwreck hazards for mariners sailing through the English Channel, were the site of many technical and conceptual advances in lighthouse construction. The difficulty of gaining a foothold on the dangerous rocks, particularly in the predominant swell, meant that it was a long time before anyone attempted to place any warning on them.

The first attempt was an octagonal wooden structure, anchored by 12 iron stanchions secured in the rock, and built by Henry Winstanley from 1696 to 1698. The tower ultimately proved short-lived, and the Great Storm of 1703 erased almost all trace of it. Following the destruction of the first lighthouse, Captain Lovett (Note: Later Colonel John Lovett (c. 1660-1710) of Liscombe Park Buckinghamshire and Corfe, (son and heir of former merchant in Turkey, Christopher Lovett, lord mayor of Dublin 1676-1677) and uncle of noted architect Edward Lovett Pearce 1699-1733.) acquired the lease of the rock and, by Act of Parliament, was allowed to charge passing ships a toll of one penny per ton. He commissioned John Rudyard (or Rudyerd) to design the new lighthouse, built as a conical wooden structure around a core of brick and concrete. A temporary light was first shone from it in 1708 and the work was completed in 1709. This proved more durable, surviving until 1755, when it burnt to the ground.

The civil engineer, John Smeaton, rebuilt the lighthouse from 1756 to 1759; his tower marked a major step forward in the design of lighthouses and remained in use until 1877. He modelled the shape of his lighthouse on that of an oak tree, using granite blocks. He pioneered the use of "hydraulic lime," a form of concrete that will set under water, and developed a technique of securing the granite blocks together using dovetail joints and marble dowels. The dovetailing feature served to improve the structural stability, although Smeaton also had to taper the thickness of the tower towards the top, for which he curved the tower inwards on a gentle gradient. This profile had the added advantage of allowing some of the energy of the waves to dissipate on impact with the walls.

Construction started at a site in Millbay where Smeaton built a jetty and workyard in the south-west corner of the harbour for unloading and working the stone. Timber rails of 3 ft. 6 in. gauge were laid for the four-wheeled flat trucks on which the masonry was moved around the site. A ten-ton ship, named the Eddystone Boat, was based here and took the worked stones out to the reef. The lighthouse was 72 feet (22 m) high and had a diameter at the base of 26 feet (7.9 m) and at the top of 17 feet (5.2 m).

==== Further development ====
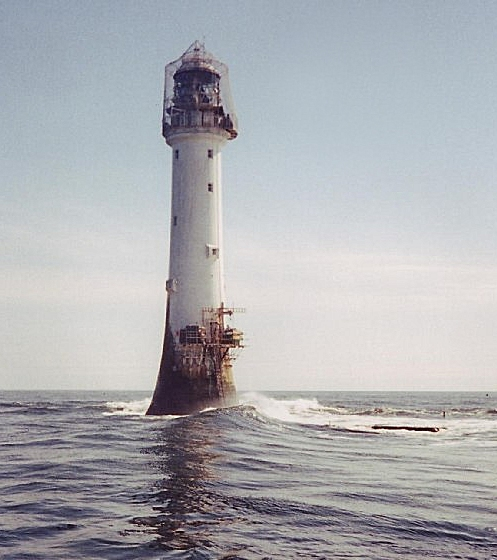
Bell Rock Lighthouse off the east coast of Scotland, constructed on a dangerous rock submerged at most states of the tide

Scottish engineer Robert Stevenson was a seminal figure in the development of lighthouse design and construction in the first half of the 19th century. In 1797, he was appointed engineer to the newly formed Northern Lighthouse Board, the lighthouse authority for Scotland and the Isle of Man. His greatest achievement was the construction of the Bell Rock Lighthouse in 1810, one of the most impressive feats of engineering of the age. This structure was based upon the design of the earlier Eddystone Lighthouse by John Smeaton, but with several improved features, such as the incorporation of rotating lights alternating between red and white.

Stevenson worked for the Northern Lighthouse Board for nearly fifty years during which time he designed and oversaw the construction and later improvement of numerous lighthouses. He innovated in the choice of light sources, mountings, reflector design, the use of Fresnel lenses, and in rotation and shuttering systems, providing lighthouses with individual signatures, allowing them to be identified by seafarers. He also invented the movable jib and the balance crane as necessary parts for lighthouse construction.

Stevenson established a great dynasty of engineers specializing in lighthouse construction; his descendants were responsible for most of the lighthouse construction in Scotland for a century. Three of Robert's sons followed in his path: David, Alan, and Thomas. Two of David's children, David Alan and Charles Alexander, also became distinguished lighthouse engineers in their own right.

Alexander Mitchell designed the first screw-pile lighthouse; his lighthouse was built on piles that were screwed into the sandy or muddy seabed. Construction of his design began in 1838 at the mouth of the Thames and was known as the Maplin Sands lighthouse, which was first lit in 1841. However, though its construction began later, the Wyre Light in Fleetwood, Lancashire, was the first to be lit (in 1840).

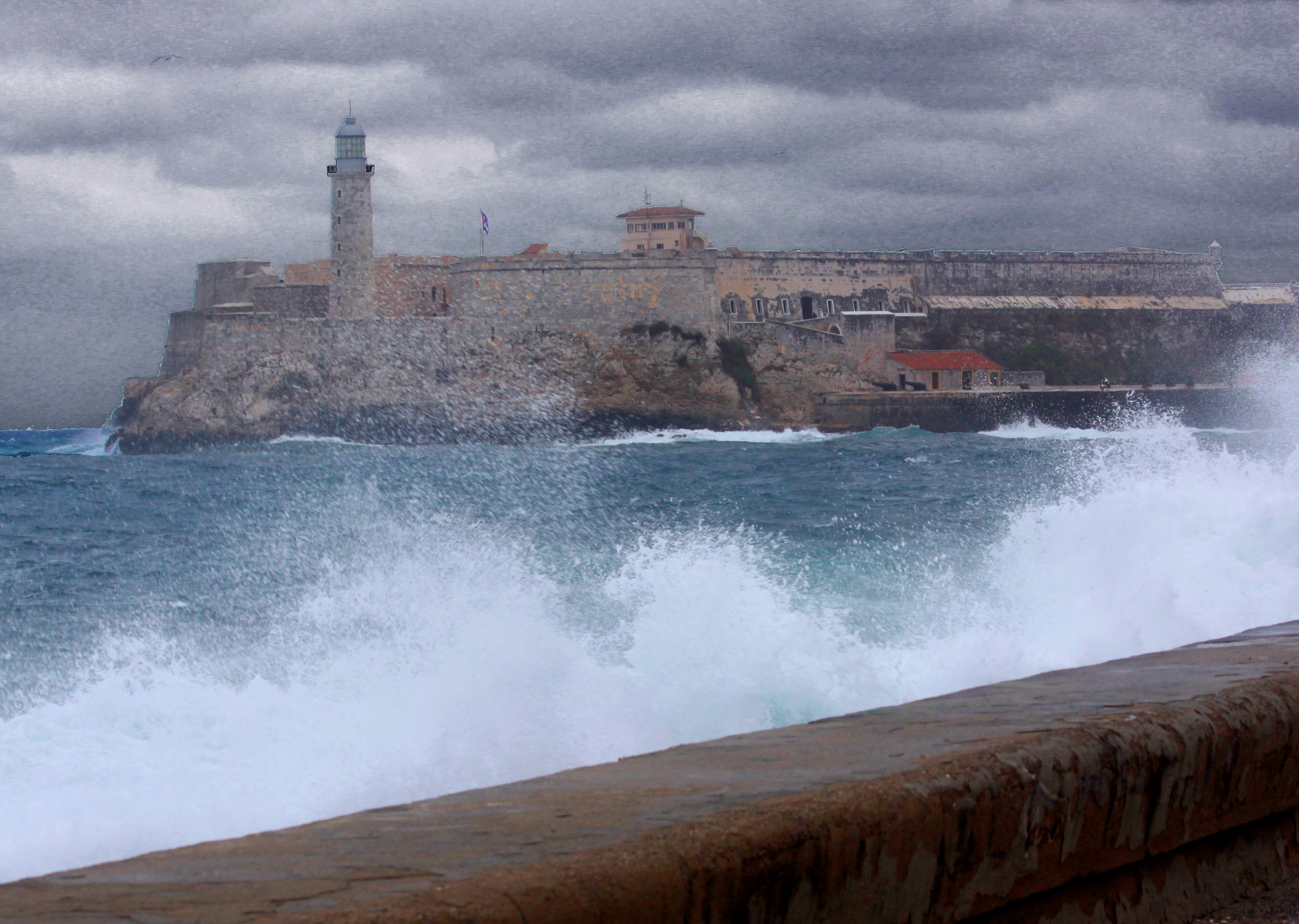
The first lighthouse in América was built in the Three Kings of Morro fortress in Havana in the 17th century. The current lighthouse dates from 1845.

==== Lighthouses in America ====
The first lighthouse in America was the 17th century lighthouse and watchtower of the Three Kings of Morro fortress in Havana, the most important port of the Caribbean and intensely used for the twice a year Spanish treasure fleet voyages to and from Spain. The first lighthouse in today's United States was the Boston Light, built in 1716 at Boston Harbor. Lighthouses were soon built along the marshy coast lines from Delaware to North Carolina, where navigation was difficult and treacherous. These were generally made of wood, as it was readily available. Due to the fire hazard, masonry towers were increasingly built - the oldest standing masonry tower was Sandy Hook Lighthouse, built in 1764 in New Jersey.

Screw-pile lighthouses were used in Chesapeake Bay and along the Carolina coast in the United States. The first screw pile light in the United States was Brandywine Shoal in Delaware Bay. They became especially popular after the Civil War, when the Lighthouse Board approved a policy to replace lighthouses in the interior. Around 100 of these complex structures were built on the Atlantic coast line from the Delaware and Chesapeake Bays down to the Florida Keys and Gulf of Mexico. One of the most famous towers was the Thomas Point Shoal Light; it has been called “the finest example of a screw pile cottage anywhere in the world.”

Another historic lighthouse in America is the San Juan de Ulúa fortress Veracruz lighthouse (1790), which was the first modern lighthouse in the American Spanish Empire.

On March 3, 1851, the U.S. Congress passed "An Act Making Appropriations for Light House, Light Boats, Buoys, &c.", leading to the creation of the United States Lighthouse Board to replace the Department of Treasury's Lighthouse Establishment as the governmental agency responsible for the construction and maintenance of all lighthouses and navigation aids in the United States.

Most recently, new high-power LED technology has started to replace the old rotating systems. Modern lighthouses need no moving parts, simply a computer controlled electronic oscillator. In simple terms, we could call it a Strobe light.

=== Lighting improvements ===
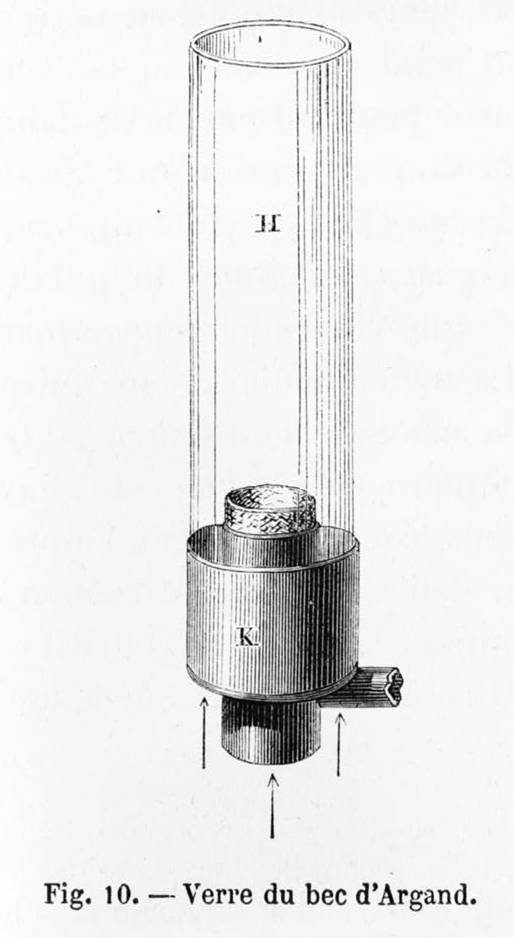
Argand lamp with circular wick and glass chimney. (Illustration from Les Merveilles de la science [1867-1869] by Louis Figuier).

The source of illumination had generally been wood pyres or burning coal, but this was expensive; some lighthouses consumed 400 tons of coal a year. Candles or oil lamps backed by concave mirrors were used, often in large banks. The French conducted a series of tests between 1783 and 1788, with varying results. Smeaton's Eddystone lighthouse used 24 candles until 1810.

The Argand lamp, invented in 1782 by the Swiss scientist Aimé Argand, revolutionized lighthouse illumination with its steady, smokeless flame. The Argand lamp had a sleeve-shaped candle wick mounted so that air could pass both through the center of the wick and also around the outside of the wick before being drawn into a cylindrical chimney. This steadied the flame and improved the flow of air. Early models used ground glass, which was sometimes tinted around the wick. Later models used a mantle of thorium dioxide suspended over the flame, creating a bright, steady light. The Argand lamp used whale oil, colza, olive oil or other vegetable oil as fuel, which was supplied by a gravity feed from a reservoir mounted above the burner. The lamp was first produced by Matthew Boulton, in partnership with Argand, in 1784 and became the standard for lighthouses for over a century.

John Richardson Wigham was the first to develop a system for the gas illumination of lighthouses. He was given a grant by the Dublin Ballast Board in 1865, and he fitted his new gas 'crocus' burner at the Baily Lighthouse in Howth Head, (Note: The 'crocus' burner was important in that it established the superiority of gas over oil, however Wigham replaced the 'crocus' design with his 'composite' burner) giving an output 4 times more powerful than the equivalent oil lights. An improved 'composite' design, installed in the Baily light in 1868, was 13 times more powerful than the most brilliant light then known, according to the scientist John Tyndall, an advisor to the United Kingdom's lighthouse authority, Trinity House.

In 1870, the light at Wicklow Head was fitted with Wigham's patent intermittent flashing mechanism, which timed the gas supply by means of clockwork. When this mechanism was combined with a revolving lens in Rockabill Lighthouse, the world's first lighthouse with a group-flashing characteristic was produced.

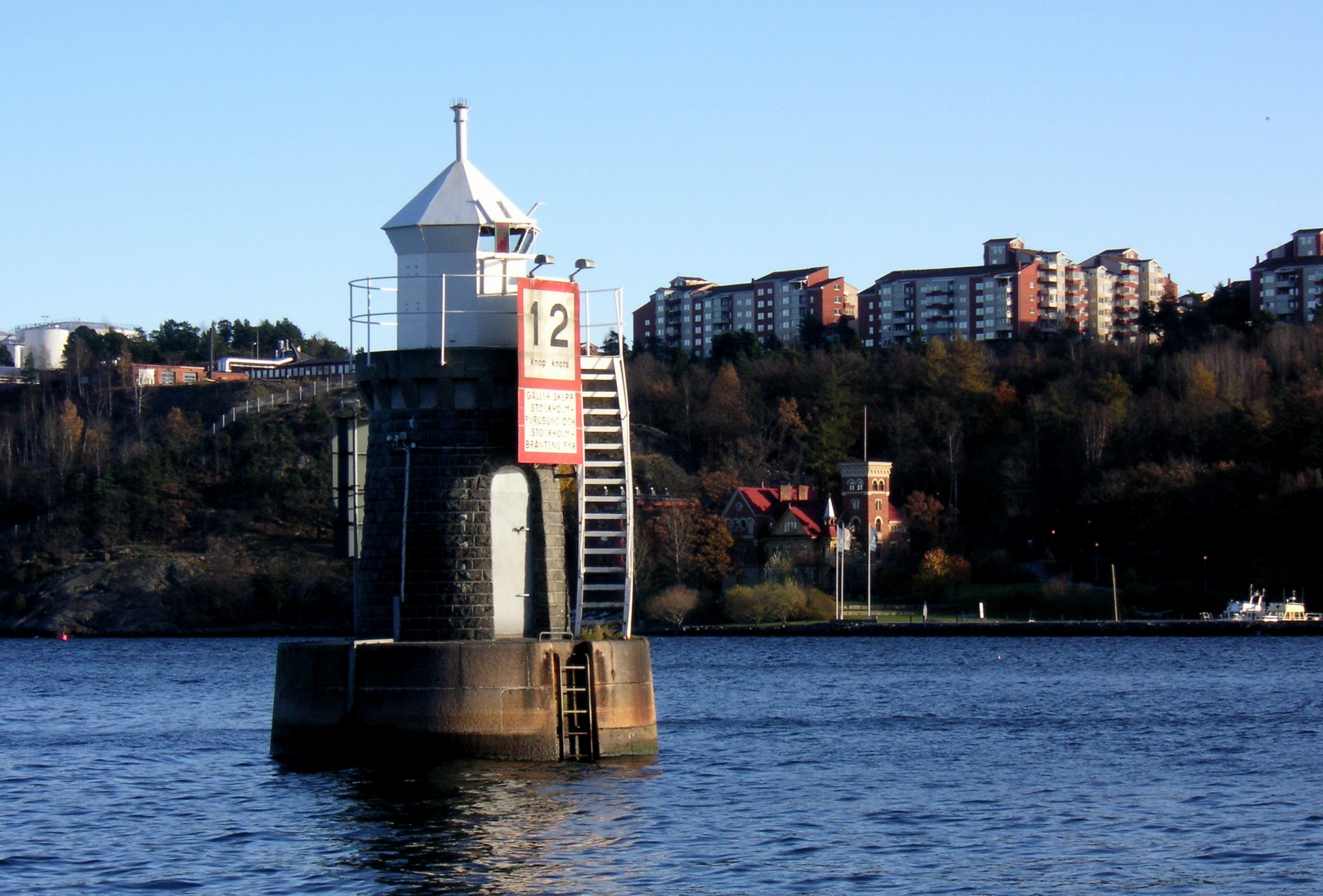
The AGA lighthouse "Blockhusudden", set up in 1912, used the Dalén light invented in 1906.

The vaporized oil burner was invented in 1901 by Arthur Kitson and improved by David Hood at Trinity House. The fuel was vaporized at high pressure and burned to heat the mantle, giving an output of over six times the luminosity of traditional oil lights.

The use of gas as an illuminant became widely available with the invention of the Dalén light by Swedish engineer, Gustaf Dalén. In 1906, Dalén became the chief engineer at the Gas Accumulator Company. Initially, Dalén worked with acetylene, an extremely explosive hydrocarbon gas. Dalén invented Agamassan (Aga), a substrate used to absorb the gas, allowing safe storage and hence commercial exploitation. Acetylene produced an ultra-bright white light and immediately superseded the duller-flamed LPG as the fuel of choice in lighthouse illuminations. Dalén incorporated another invention into his light: the 'sun valve'. This device allowed the light to operate only at night, conserving fuel and extending its service life to over a year.

The AGA lighthouse equipment worked without any type of electric supply and was thus extremely reliable. In a rugged coastal area like Scandinavia, his mass-produced, robust, minimal maintenance lights were a significant boon to safety and livelihood. AGA Lighthouses covered the entire Panama Canal. The technology was the predominant form of light source in lighthouses from the 1900s through the 1960s, when electric lighting had become dominant.

The first electrically illuminated lighthouse was the tower at Dungeness, Kent, in 1862. It was powered by a large carbon arc lamp, although it was later converted back to oil, as the arc lamps were difficult to operate (needing twice the number of keepers) and were not as cost-effective as oil lamps. South Foreland Lighthouse was the first tower to successfully use an electric light in 1875. The lighthouse's carbon arc lamps were powered by a steam-driven magneto.

=== Optics ===
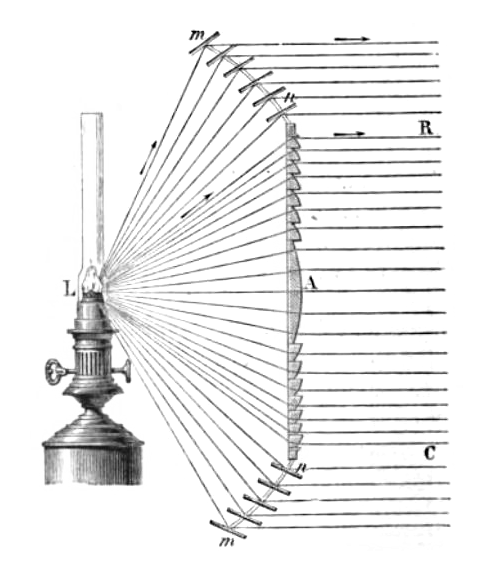
Diagram depicting how a spherical Fresnel lens collimates light.

With the development of the steady illumination of the Argand lamp, the application of optical lenses to increase and focus the light intensity became a practical possibility. William Hutchinson developed the first practical optical system in 1763, known as a catoptric system. He constructed paraboloidal reflectors by attaching small pieces of reflective material to a cast that had been moulded into an approximate paraboloid. This rudimentary system effectively collimated the emitted light into a concentrated beam, thereby greatly increasing the light's visibility. His system was installed in the newly built Leasowe Lighthouse near Liverpool and was later copied elsewhere. The ability to focus the light led to the first revolving lighthouse beams, where the light would appear to the mariners as a series of intermittent flashes. It also became possible to transmit complex signals using light flashes.

The idea of creating a thinner, lighter lens by making it with separate sections mounted in a frame is often attributed to Georges-Louis Leclerc, Comte de Buffon. The marquis de Condorcet (1743–1794) proposed grinding such a lens from a single thin piece of glass.

However, it was the French physicist and engineer Augustin-Jean Fresnel who is credited with the development of the multi-part Fresnel lens for use in lighthouses. His design allowed for the construction of lenses of large aperture and short focal length, without the mass and volume of material that would be required by a lens of conventional design. A Fresnel lens can be made much thinner than a comparable conventional lens, in some cases taking the form of a flat sheet. A Fresnel lens can also capture more oblique light from a light source, thus allowing the light from a lighthouse equipped with one to be visible over greater distances.

The first Fresnel lens was used in 1823 in the Cordouan Lighthouse at the mouth of the Gironde estuary in France; its light could be seen from more than 20 miles (32 km) out. Scottish physicist Sir David Brewster is credited with convincing the British authorities to adopt these lenses in their lighthouses. Fresnel's invention increased the luminosity of the lighthouse lamp by a factor of 4 and his system is still in common use.

== See also ==
- Roman engineering
