= Söderarm =

Lighthouse in Sweden

Söderarm Lighthouse
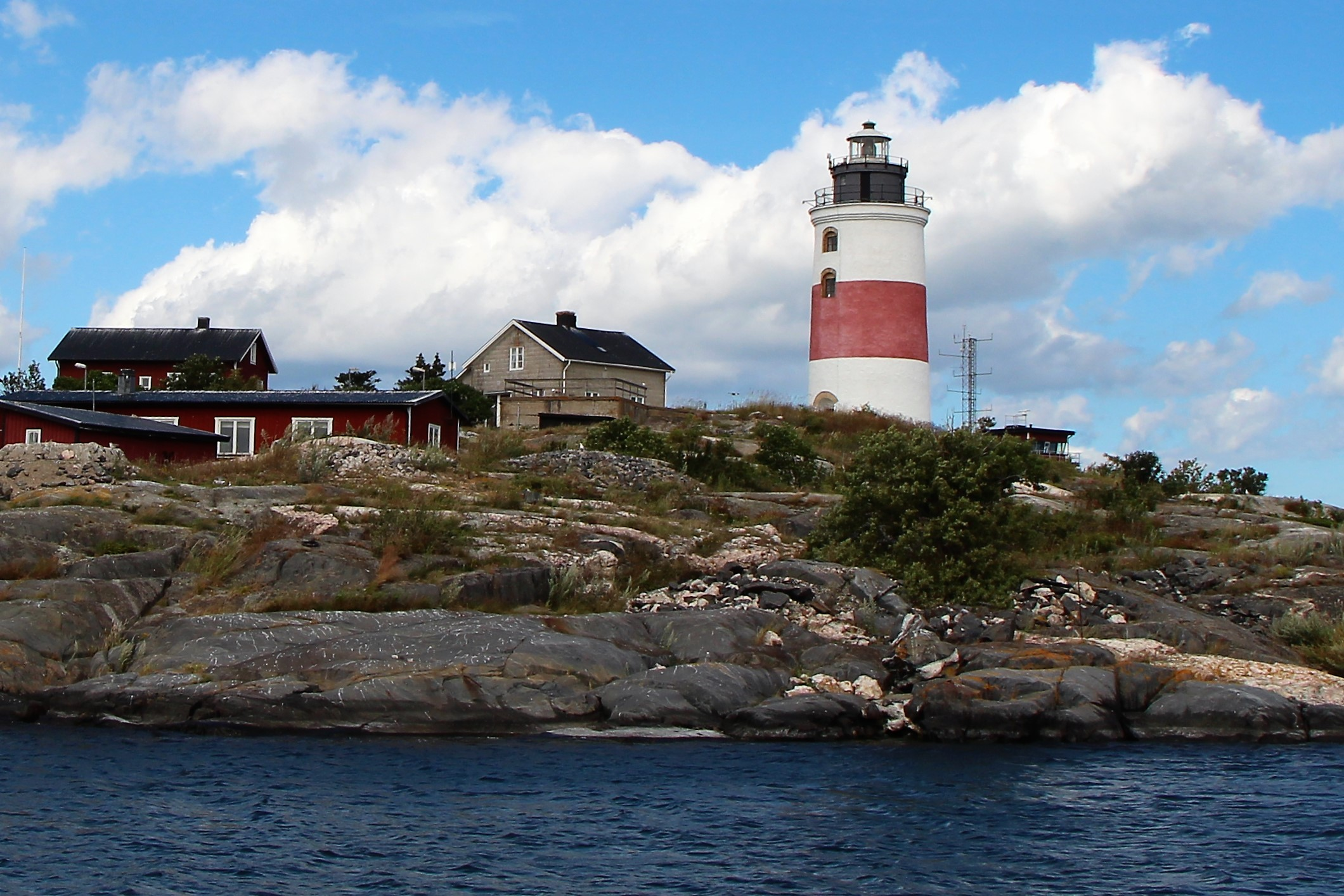
- Söderarm
- Location: Söderarm; Sweden
- Coordinates: 59.752891°N 19.405993°E

Tower
- Constructed: 1839
- Foundation: stone basement
- Construction: granite tower
- Automated: 1953
- Height: 21 metres (69 ft)
- Shape: cylindrical tower with balcony and lantern
- Markings: white tower with a red band, black observation room and lantern
- Power source: rapeseed oil, kerosene, acetylene, electricity
- Operator: Söderarm Fyr
- Heritage: governmental listed building complex, governmental listed building

Light
- Deactivated: 2007
- Focal height: 46 metres (151 ft)
- Lens: parabolic mirrors (original), 3rd order Fresnel lens (1953), aerobeacon (1999-2007)
- Range: 16 nautical miles (30 km; 18 mi)
- Characteristic: Exting (2007–)
- sweden no.: SV-2590

Söderarm is the name of a deactivated Swedish lighthouse station and its surrounding small archipelago in the west part of the Sea of Åland.

The light station is located on the island of Thorskär. This area, together with the tiny island of Tjärven north of Söderarm, marks the entrance for the shipping route leading to the ports of Kapellskär, Norrtälje, and also the north entrance to Stockholm. The area has been heavily fortified by the Swedish military and coastal artillery, and many traces of military activity from the years during the second world war are still visible. On the island of Manskär, for example, a large military radar mast stood for many years. It was demolished in 2010. In 2002, the coastal artillery was formally liquidated at Söderarm, but still some islands are forbidden for the public to visit. The Swedish Maritime Administration has confirmed that many Russian mines dating from the First World War may still lie on the sea bottom east of the light station, making anchoring or diving there dangerous.

== History ==
In the 17th century, the first land beacons were constructed at Thorskär, Söderarm. In 1839, the lighthouse was built and the island staffed. The light ran on colza oil, and mirrors reflected it. More houses and buildings were added during the 19th century. In 1882, a kerosene lamp replaced the old lamp, but the mirrors remained until 1928 when a third order lens and Gustaf Daléns AGA-light replaced the old equipment. In 1953, the light was finally electrified and automated. The station was, however, staffed until September 1997. In 1999, a small aerobeacon mounted on a metallic mast replaced the traditional light, which was deactivated and taken away by the Swedish Maritime Administration in the summer of 2007. Söderarm had been seen as a typical example of a lighthouse not needed for modern commercial shipping. However, the old lens and light equipment remains, and plans to reactivate the lighthouse have been discussed. The metallic mast was removed in the autumn of 2009. A conference company currently promotes activity in the old light station buildings. Overnight accommodations are available in the keeper's house. Söderam is frequently reported as a weather station in the Swedish Meteorological and Hydrological Institute (SMHI) shipping news. The lighthouse has been protected by Swedish law since 1935 as a culturally important building.

== Near future ==
Söderarm lighthouse island will be taken back into military use as of January 1, 2025. Söderarm AB tourism operations on the island will end at the same time, after 25 years.

== See also ==
- List of lighthouses and lightvessels in Sweden
