= Carbide lamp =

Acetylene-burning lamps

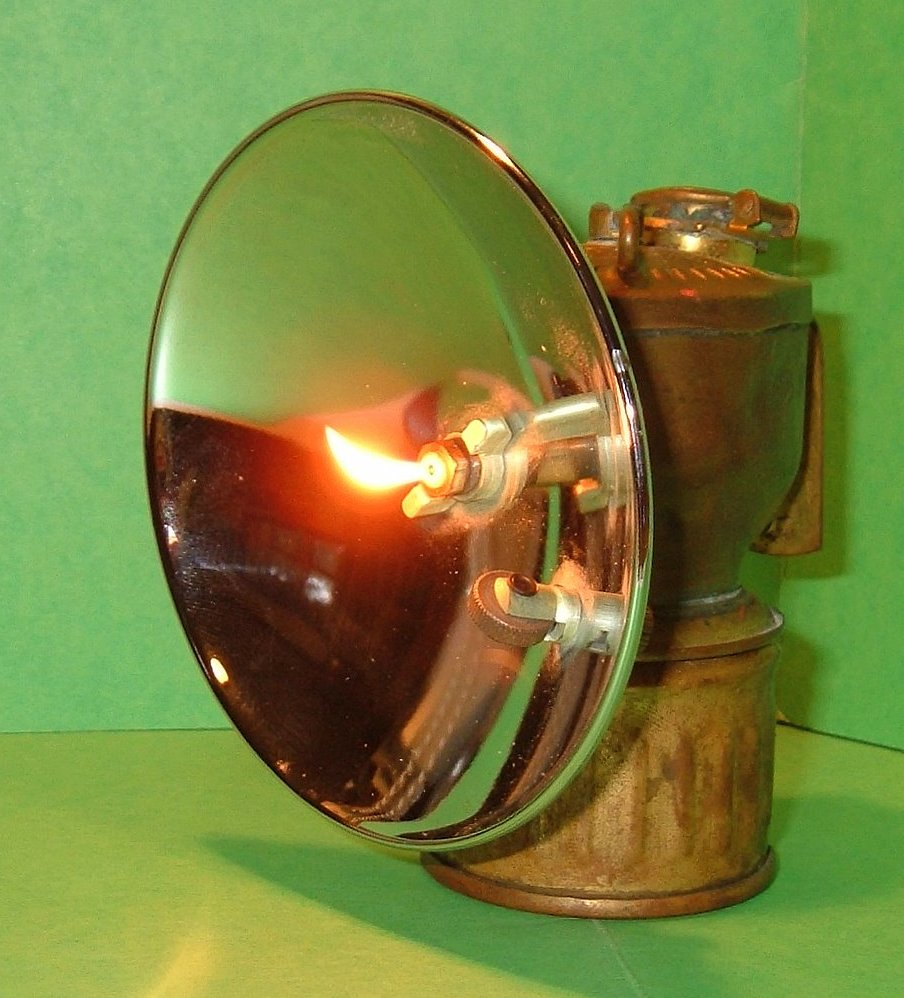
An acetylene gas miner's lamp

A carbide lamp or acetylene gas lamp is a simple lamp that produces and burns acetylene (C_{2}H_{2}), which is created by the reaction of calcium carbide (CaC_{2}) with water (H_{2}O).

Acetylene gas lamps were used to illuminate buildings, as lighthouse beacons, and as headlights on motor-cars and bicycles. Portable acetylene gas lamps, worn on the hat or carried by hand, were widely used in mining in the early twentieth century. They are still employed by cavers, hunters, and cataphiles.

== History ==
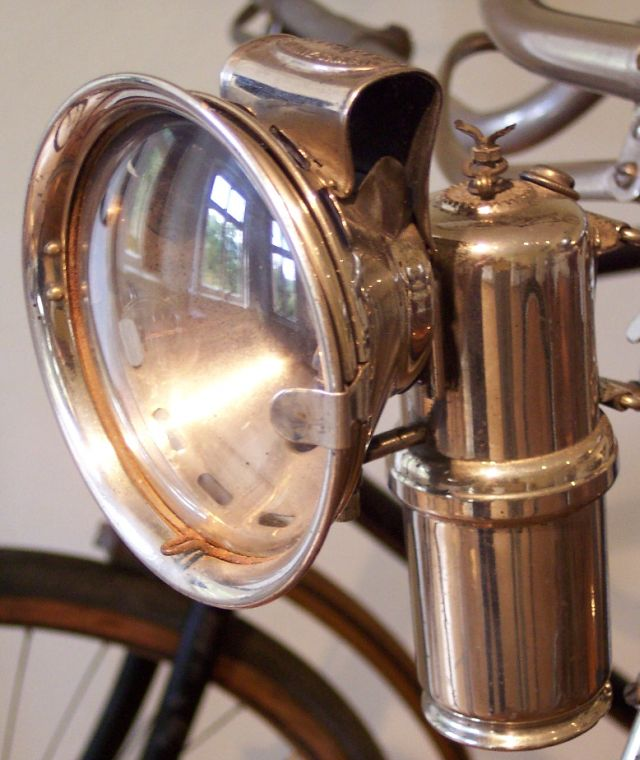
A French manufactured acetylene gas lamp, of circa 1910, mounted on a bicycle

In 1892, Thomas Willson discovered an economically efficient process for creating calcium carbide in an electric arc furnace from a mixture of lime and coke. The arc furnace provides the high temperature required to drive the reaction. Manufacture of calcium carbide was an important part of the industrial revolution in chemistry, and was made possible in the United States as a result of massive amounts of inexpensive hydroelectric power produced at Niagara Falls before the turn of the twentieth century. In 1895, Willson sold his patent to Union Carbide. Domestic lighting with acetylene gas was introduced circa 1894 and bicycle lamps from 1896. In France, Gustave Trouvé, a Parisian electrical engineer, also made domestic acetylene lamps and gasometers.

The first carbide bicycle lamp developed in the United States was patented in New York on August 28, 1900, by Frederick Baldwin. Another early lamp design is shown in a patent from Duluth, Minnesota from October 21, 1902. In the early 1900s, Gustaf Dalén invented the Dalén light. This combined two of Dalén's previous inventions, namely the substrate Agamassan and the Sun valve. Inventions and improvements to carbide lamps continued for decades.

After carbide lamp open flames were implicated in the 1932 Moweaqua Coal Mine disaster, an Illinois coal-seam methane gas explosion that killed 54 miners, carbide lamp use declined in United States coal mines. They continued to be used in the coal pits of other countries, notably the Soviet Union, and in gold mining in California.

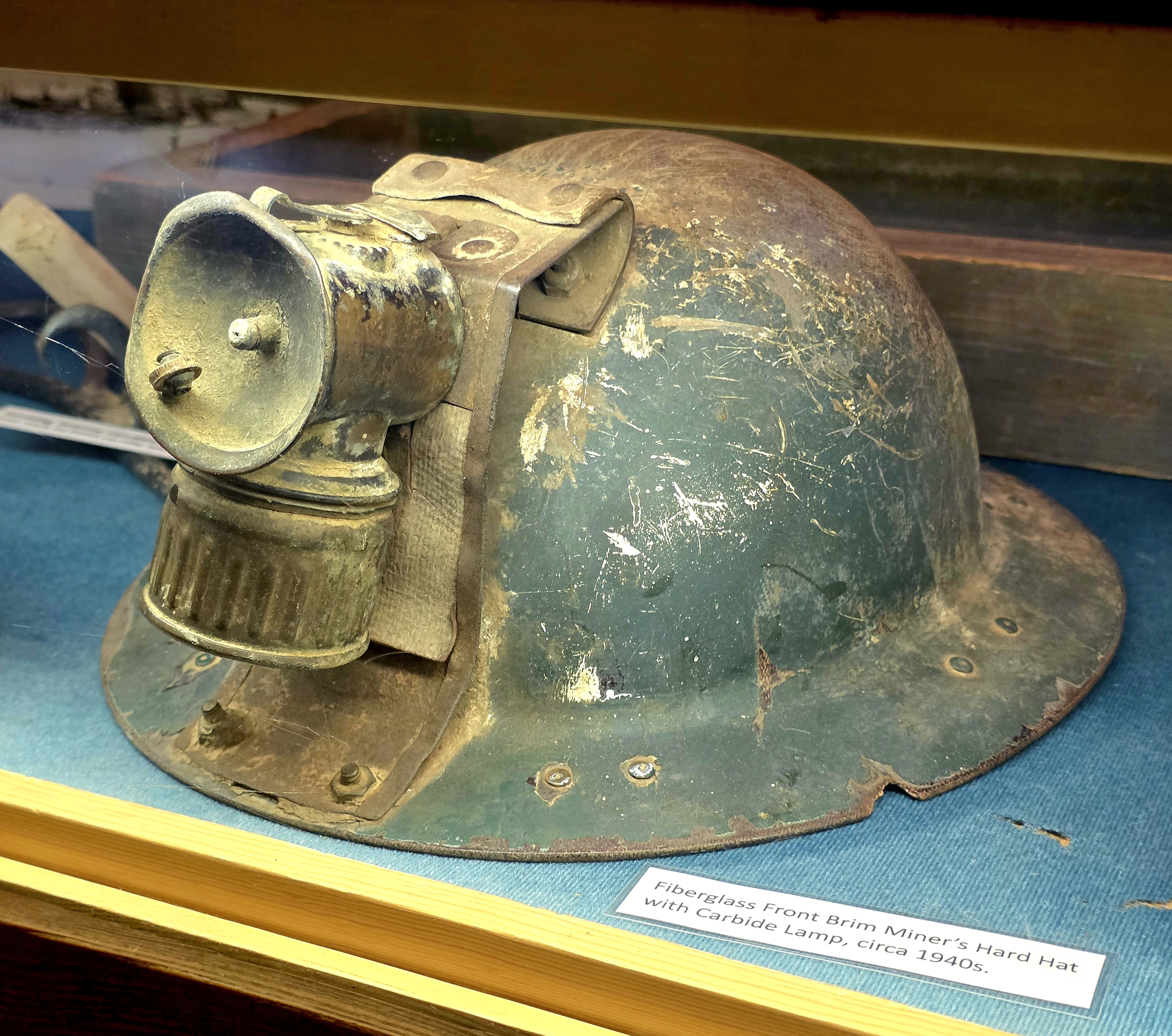
1940s era gold miner's helmet with carbide lamp

== Mechanism ==
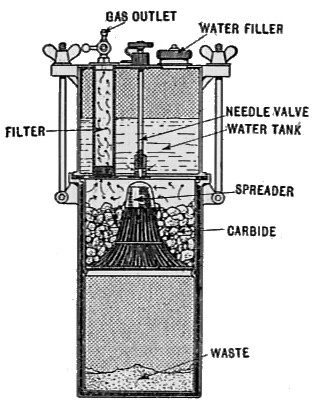
Carbide acetylene gas generator, drip type (Autocar Handbook, Ninth edition)

A mining or caving lamp has calcium carbide placed in a lower chamber, the generator. The upper reservoir is then filled with water. A threaded valve or other mechanism is used to control the rate at which the water is allowed to drip into the chamber containing the calcium carbide. By controlling the rate of water flow, the production of acetylene gas is controlled. This, in turn, controls the flow rate of the gas and the size of the flame at the burner, and thus the amount of light it produces.

This type of lamp generally has a reflector behind the flame to help project the light forward. An acetylene gas powered lamp produces a bright, broad light. Many cavers prefer this type of unfocused light as it improves peripheral vision in the complete dark. The reaction of carbide with water is exothermic and produces a fair amount of heat independent of the flame. In cold caves, carbide lamp users can use this heat to help stave off hypothermia.

Acetylene is produced by the reaction:

CaC_{2(s)} + 2H_{2}O_{(l)} → C_{2}H_{2}_{(g)} + Ca(OH)_{2}_{(aq)}

The acetylene combusts easily in the atmosphere:

2C_{2}H_{2} + 5O_{2} → 4CO_{2} + 2H_{2}O + ΔH = −1300 kJ/mol

When all of the carbide in a lamp has been reacted, the carbide chamber contains a wet paste of slaked lime (Ca(OH)_{2}) which can be used to make a cement. This is emptied into a waste bag and the chamber can be refilled.

== Uses ==
=== Lighting systems ===
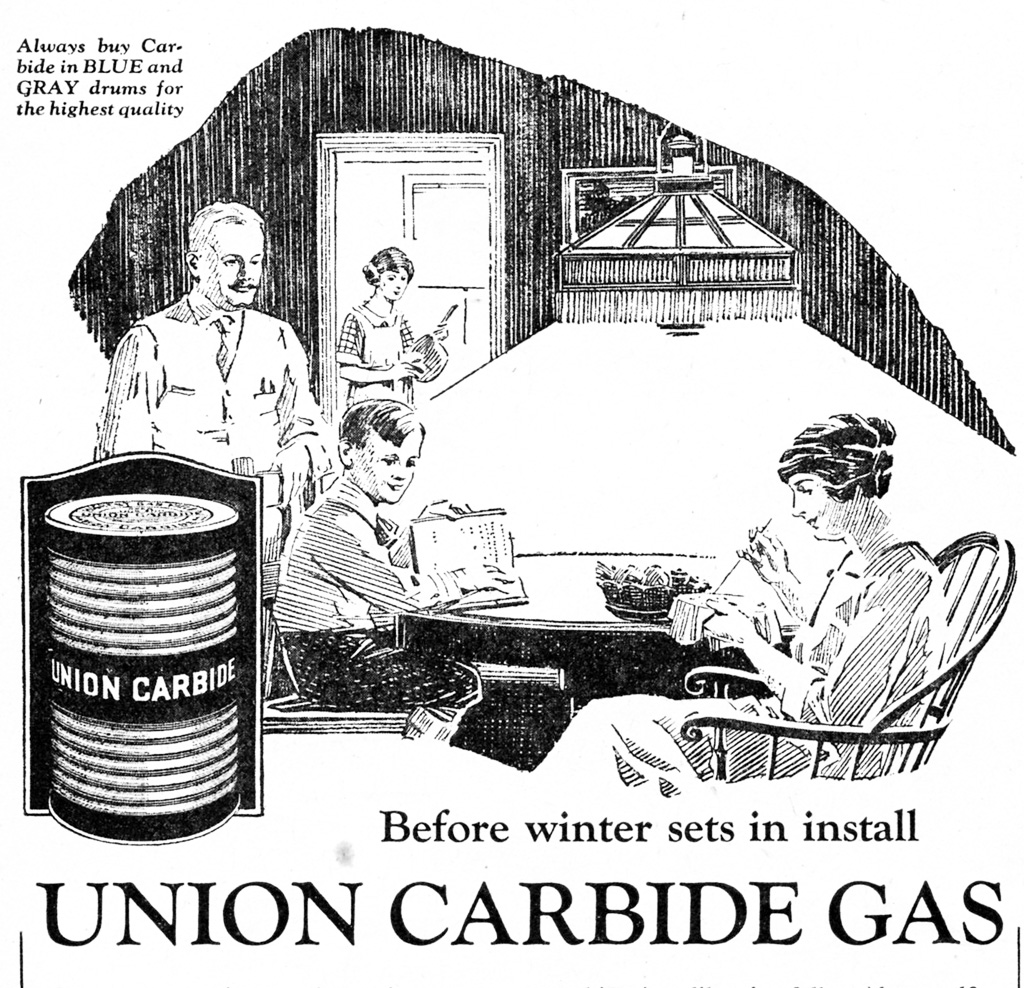
Advertisement for home acetylene gas lighting, 1922

Carbide lighting was used in rural and urban areas of the United States which were not served by electrification. Its use began shortly after 1900 and continued past 1950. Calcium carbide pellets were placed in a container outside the home, with water piped to the container and allowed to drip on the pellets releasing acetylene. This gas was piped to light fixtures inside the house, where it was burned, creating a very bright flame. Carbide lighting was inexpensive, but was prone to gas leaks and explosions.

Early models of the automobile, motorbike and bicycle used carbide lamps as headlamps. Acetylene gas, derived from carbide, enabled early automobiles to drive safely at night. Thick concave mirrors combined with magnifying lenses projected the acetylene flame light. These types of lights were used until reliable batteries and dynamos became available, and manufacturers switched to electric lights.

Acetylene lamps were also used on riverboats for night navigation. The National Museum of Australia has a lamp made c.1910 that was used on board PS Enterprise, a paddle steamer which has been restored to working order and also in the museum's collection.

=== Caving ===
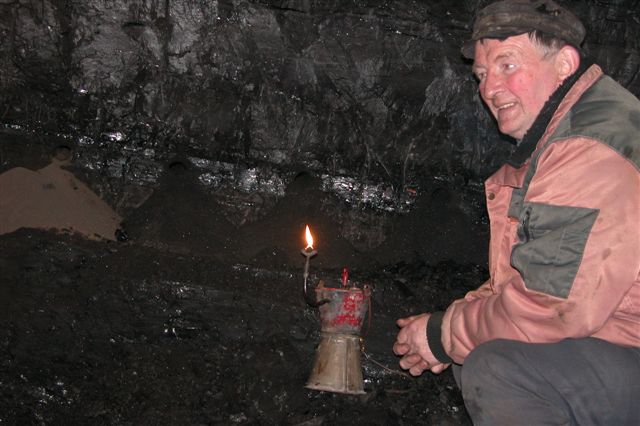
Carbide lamp in a coal mine

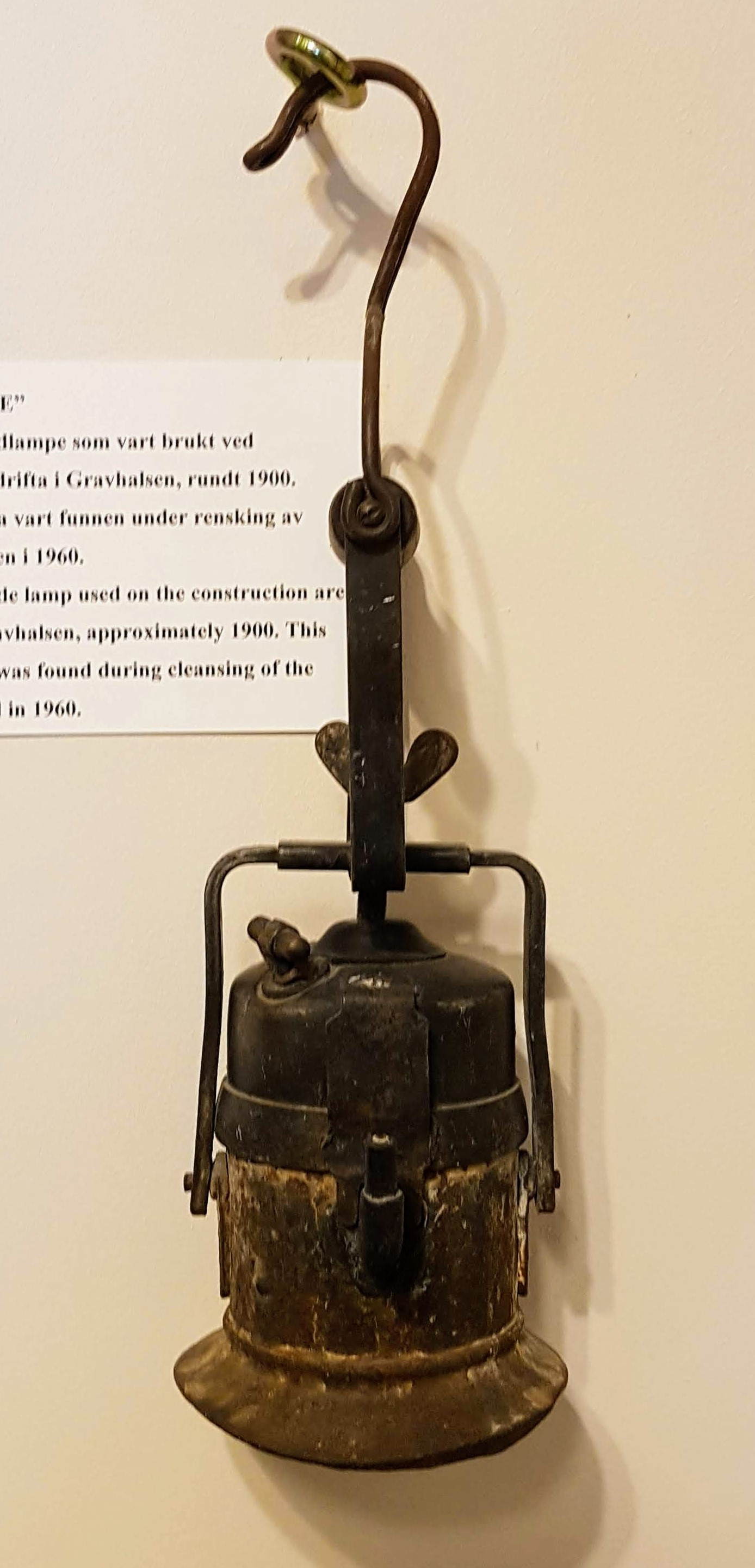
A carbide lamp from 1900s at the Railway Museum in Flåm, Norway

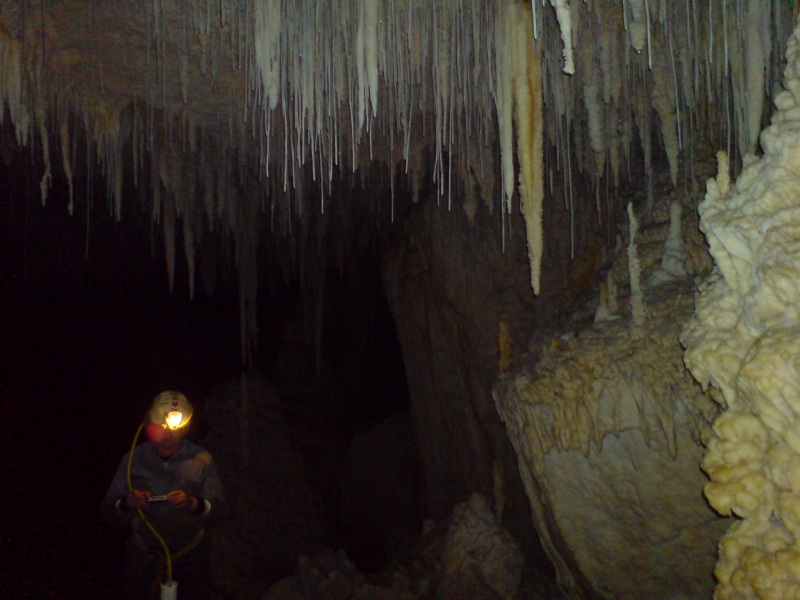
While LED electric lights have mostly replaced carbide lamps, some still prefer the "old-school" approach of using carbide lamps during recreational caving excursions

Early caving enthusiasts, not yet having the advantage of light-weight electrical illumination, introduced the carbide lamp to their hobby.

Many cavers favour carbide lamps for their durability and quality of illumination. They were once favoured for their relative illumination per mass of fuel compared to battery-powered devices. Before the advent of high-intensity light-emitting diode (LED) illumination with lithium-ion batteries, carbide also had two important advantages over the alternative of miners electric lamps. Miner's lamps were intended to last for the duration of a standard working shift, whilst major caving explorations could be much longer, so the carbide could be replenished during the trip. Expeditions involving camping over several days in remote regions might not have access to electricity for recharging. Lamps used in such circumstances would consist of a belt-mounted gas generator linked by flexible pipe to a headset.

The acetylene producing reaction is exothermic, which means that the lamp's reactor vessel will become quite warm to the touch; this can be used to warm the hands. The heat from the flame can also be used to warm the body by allowing the exhaust gases to flow under a shirt or poncho pulled out from the body, a technique discovered almost immediately by coal miners, and nicknamed by cavers the "Palmer furnace".

The lamps are sometimes called "stinkies" because of their odour.

=== Glare reduction ===
Small carbide lamps called "carbide candles" or "smokers" are used for blackening rifle sights to reduce glare. They are sometimes referred to as "smokers" because of the sooty flame produced by acetylene.

== See also ==
- Flashlight – Portable hand-held electric light
- Trouble light – Type of lamp
