= Eccles mine disaster =

1914 explosion in West Virginia, U.S.

Coordinates: 37.7779°N 81.2617°W

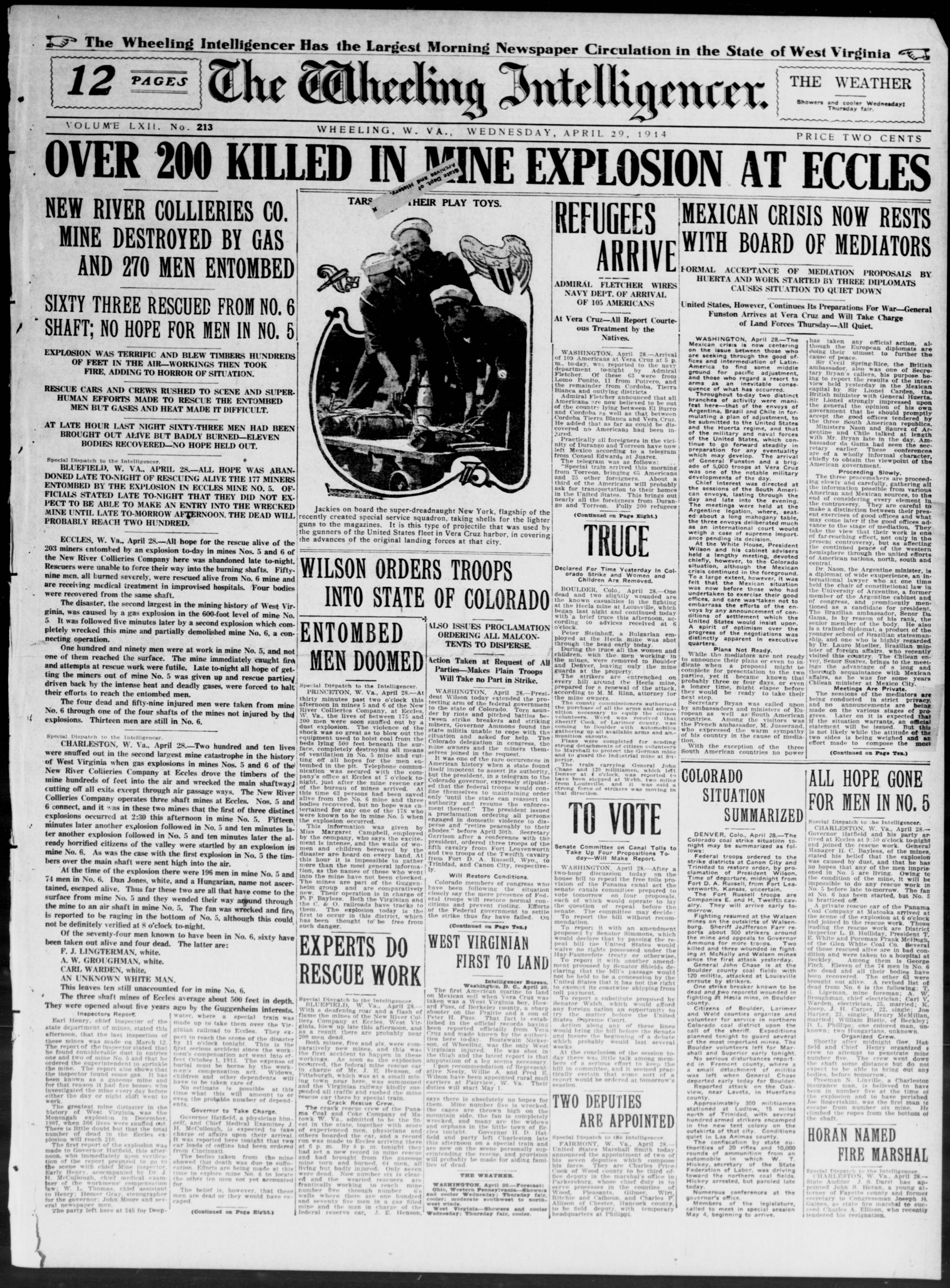
- Front Page of The Wheeling Intelligencer April 29, 1914
- Date: April 28, 1914
- Location: Eccles, West Virginia
- Cause: Coal Mine explosion
- Casualties: At least 180 men and boys

The Eccles mine disaster was an explosion of coal-seam methane that took place on April 28, 1914, in Eccles, West Virginia. The explosion took the lives of at least 180 men and boys.

== The disaster ==
The Eccles No. 5 mine was opened in 1905; served by the Chesapeake and Ohio and the Virginian Railway, it mined West Virginia smokeless coal. The mine was owned by the New River Colliers Company, a Guggenheim family interest at the time. As with other West Virginia mines, the shafts pierced not only beds of coal but also pockets of natural gas. Few coal faces at the time were lighted by electricity, and the miners lighted their work with helmets bearing carbide lamps that burned calcium carbide to produce flammable acetylene.

About 2:30 p.m. on April 28, 1914, a series of massive explosions ripped through the mine. A later investigation indicated that the flame of a carbide lamp had touched off a pocket of coal gas, which in turn ignited other pockets. It was the second-worst mining disaster in West Virginia history (exceeded as of 2022 only by the Monongah Mining Disaster).

At least 180 men lay dead, this being the death roll published as of 2011 by the National Coal Heritage Trail. A cemetery monument lists 183 victims, and the records of the county coroner list 186. One of the men who died was an insurance agent from Charleston, West Virginia, who had gone into the mine just before the explosion to solicit business from the men.

The workmen's compensation law of West Virginia had taken effect in October 1913, thus no appeal to charity was made on behalf of the families. Workers' compensation paid little ($20 a month for widows and supplement of $5 for each child) to victims. The disaster assisted unionization efforts in the West Virginia coal fields. A similar disaster eighteen years later in Illinois, the 1932 Moweaqua Coal Mine disaster, helped spur efforts to end the legal use of flammable carbide-acetylene lamps in U.S. coal mines.

The Eccles No. 5 mine resumed operations after the disaster, and continued in operation until 1928; the coal seam utilized by the mine continued to be extracted for many decades afterwards from other shafts. The Eccles Disaster Memorial commemorates victims of the explosions.

== Labor union ==
The mine disaster brought attention to an overall safety problem in the West Virginia mining industry and therefore aided the unions' attempts to improve the workers' conditions. The Eccles mine explosion happened at the very end of the Second Industrial Revolution.

In this time era, coal was needed in large quantities; U.S. coal production had increased from 50 million ton of coal in 1850 to 250 million tons of coal in 1903. The increasing demand for coal led to worsening work conditions. When digging for coal in deep mines, chambers of gas lay just underneath, which could be highly explosive when coming in contact with carbide headlamps. The labor union helped to ban carbide headlamps in West Virginia; they had been suspected to be the cause of the Eccles explosion and, later, a second mine explosion 18 years later in Illinois.

== See also ==
- 1932 Moweaqua Coal Mine disaster
- Monongah Mining disaster
