= Tjärven =

Lighthouse in Norrtälje Municipality, Baltic coast, Sweden

Tjärven Lighthouse
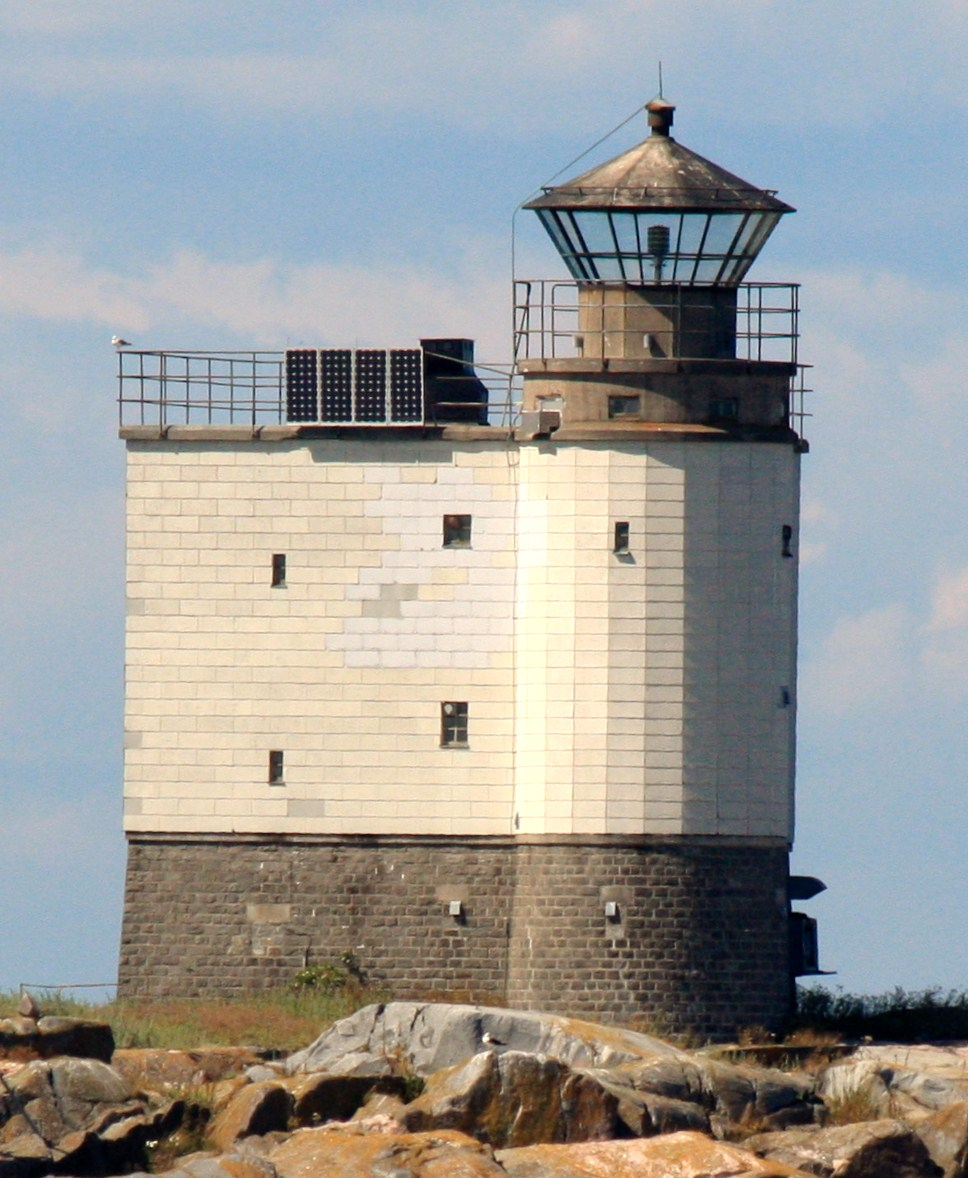
- Tjärven Lighthouse
- Location: Tjärven; Sea of Åland; Sweden
- Coordinates: 59.791866°N 19.370336°E

Tower
- Constructed: 1903
- Foundation: stone
- Construction: concrete tower
- Automated: 1945
- Height: 13 metres (43 ft)
- Shape: cylindrical tower with balcony and lantern attached to a 3-storey fortified building
- Markings: unpainted stone basement, white tower, dark lantern
- Power source: kerosene, electricity
- Operator: Swedish Maritime Administration (Sjöfartsverket)

Light
- First lit: 1 November 1903
- Focal height: 18 metres (59 ft)
- Lens: 4th order fresnel lens (original), 3rd order lens (current)
- Range: 17.5 nautical miles (32.4 km; 20.1 mi)
- Characteristic: Oc(2) WG 20s.
- Sweden no.: SV-2600

Tjärven is the name of a small island and light station surrounded by deep water and located in the sea of Åland, north of the Söderarm archipelago of the coast of Sweden. The lighthouse functions as the entrance to the shipping route for the ports of Kapellskär, Norrtälje and Stockholm.

== History ==
A day beacon existed on the island since the 19th century. The lighthouse construction began in 1902, and was finished in 1903. The original architecture included a crenelated gallery and an old-style lantern room. The building included bedrooms and a kitchen area for the lighthouse keepers. The light ran on kerosene. In 1952, the building was renovated and was redesigned in a functionalistic style with eternit bricks. The lantern was also changed and a 1000 watt electric light replaced the kerosene lamp. The Swedish Maritime Administration owns and runs the lighthouse. It renovated the building in 2008 and installed solar power. Initially, there was a decision to remove the lantern room and replace it with a mast, but this proved too hard to accomplish. That decision was also protested by lighthouse enthusiasts. So the new light was finally installed in the old lantern.

SMA has confirmed that many Russian mines dating from the first world war may still lie on the bottom of the sea east of the light station, making anchoring or diving dangerous in the area. The island can be visited by boat travelers under acceptable weather circumstances, but it is difficult to dock this remote and slippery island. And the areas surrounding it is heavily trafficked by the cruise ships plying between Sweden and Finland.

== See also ==
- List of lighthouses and lightvessels in Sweden
