= Eccles, West Virginia =

- Census-designated place (CDP)
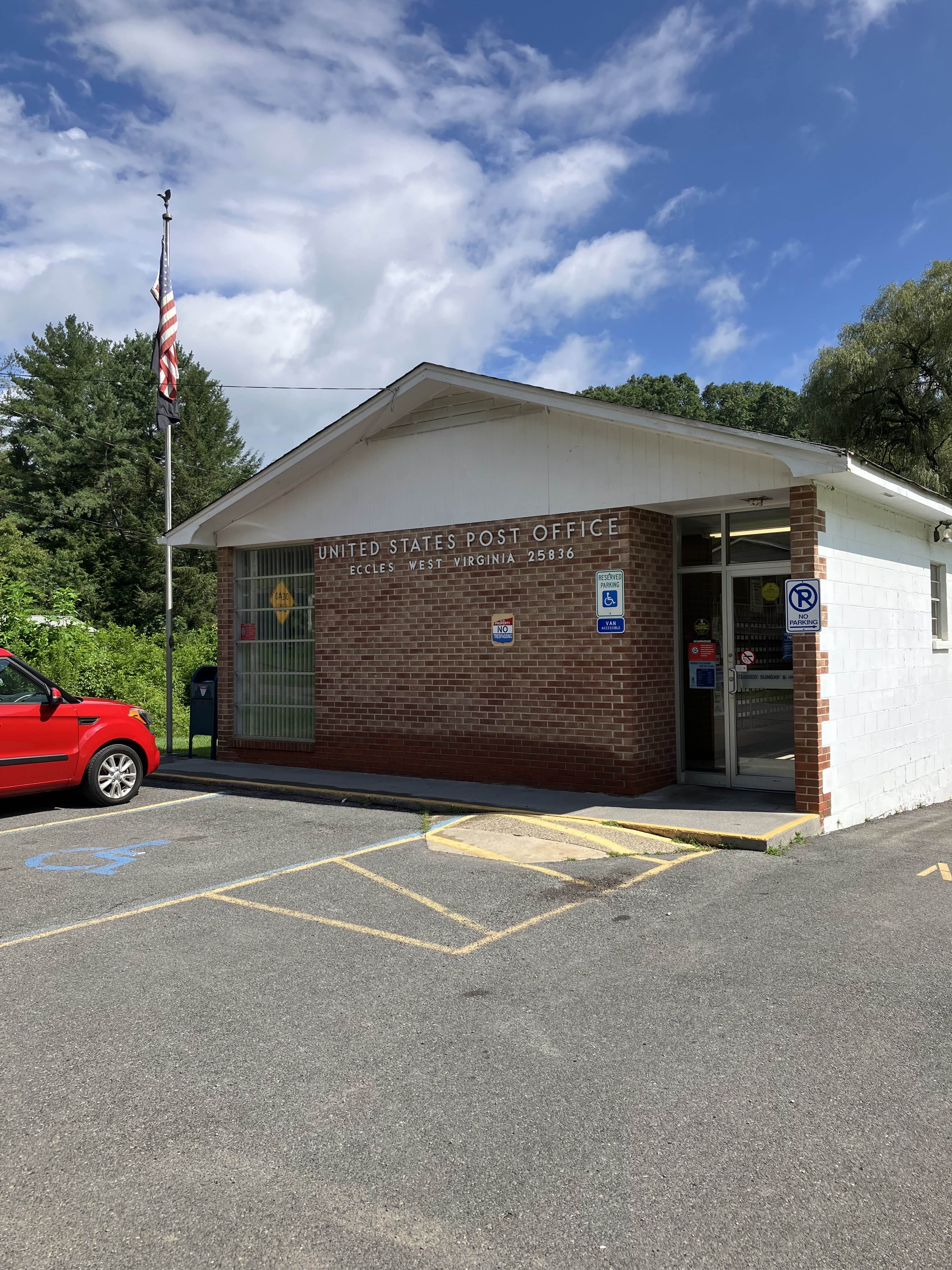
- Post office in Eccles, West Virginia

- Location within West Virginia
- Coordinates: 37°46′54″N 81°15′53″W
- Country: United States
- State: West Virginia
- County: Raleigh

Area
  - Total: 0.689 sq mi (1.78 km^{2})
  - Land: 0.687 sq mi (1.78 km^{2})
  - Water: 0.002 sq mi (0.0052 km^{2})
- Elevation: 2,182 ft (665 m)

Population (2020)
  - Total: 334
  - Density: 486/sq mi (188/km^{2})
- Time zone: UTC-5 (Eastern (EST))
  - Summer (DST): UTC-4 (EDT)
- ZIP code: 25836
- Area codes: 304 & 681
- GNIS feature ID: 2586800

Eccles is a census-designated place (CDP) in Raleigh County, West Virginia, United States. Eccles is located on West Virginia Route 3, 4 miles (6.4 km) west of Beckley. Eccles has a post office with ZIP code 25836. As of the 2020 census, its population was 334 (down from 362 at the 2010 census).

The community was originally named after the book of Ecclesiastes from the bible, where the mining company of its namesake was formed around the turn of the century. The name was later shortened by the local post office to Eccles to allow for easier postage and mail flow due to a common inability to correctly spell the name. Eccles is the site of the April 28, 1914 Eccles coal mining disaster, which took the lives of 180 men.
