= Agamassan =

Porous substrate used to transport and store acetylene

Agamassan is a porous substrate used to safely absorb acetylene and thus allow the transport, storage and commercial use of the otherwise unstable gas. It was developed and patented by the Swedish Nobel Laureate and industrialist Gustaf Dalén. Dalén was prominent in developing applications for acetylene.

Acetylene can readily explode when in liquid or solid form or while being pressurized, if it is pure. Dalén himself was blinded in an acetylene explosion.

In 1896, French chemists Georges Claude and Albert Hess discovered that large quantities of acetylene could be dissolved in acetone and rendered nonexplosive. As the liquid was reduced by consumption or cooling, explosive acetylene gas would collect in the space above the liquid's surface. The solution was to compress acetylene in a porous medium.

Before Dalén's work, numerous attempts were made to find a mass sufficiently elastic to withstand shock without crumbling and producing cavities filled with explosive acetylene gas.

Acetylene is shipped and stored in metal cylinders filled with agamassan, which is half-filled with dimethylformamide (DMF) or acetone as a solvent. The acetylene is dissolved in the DMF or acetone. The solvent holds many times the volume at atmospheric pressure of acetylene. Such cylinders are safe to transport and use as long as they are not opened sideways, to prevent the solvent from leaving the cylinder. Agamassan was devised as a compound containing asbestos and diatomaceous earth. Fine asbestos can be used at the bottom of the tank, balsa wood and infusorial earth in the bottom third, and long fiber asbestos at the top and an asbestos cloth just before the regulator. Calcium silicate hydrate can also be used as the filler material.

In Swedish, the porous filler is known as "AGA-massan", which would translate as "AGA mass", "AGA body", or "AGA compound". AGA was the company Dalén founded. The compound originally consisted of, among other things, asbestos, cement, and coal. The 1930 US patent also mentions kieselguhr (diatomaceous earth).

== References and further reading ==
- About Gustaf Dalén
- U.S. patent 1,767,514: Porous mass for the storage of explosive gases and method for making same; issued June 24, 1930
