= PS Enterprise =

19th-century Australian paddle-wheel steamboat

Coordinates: 35.2921°S 149.1218°E

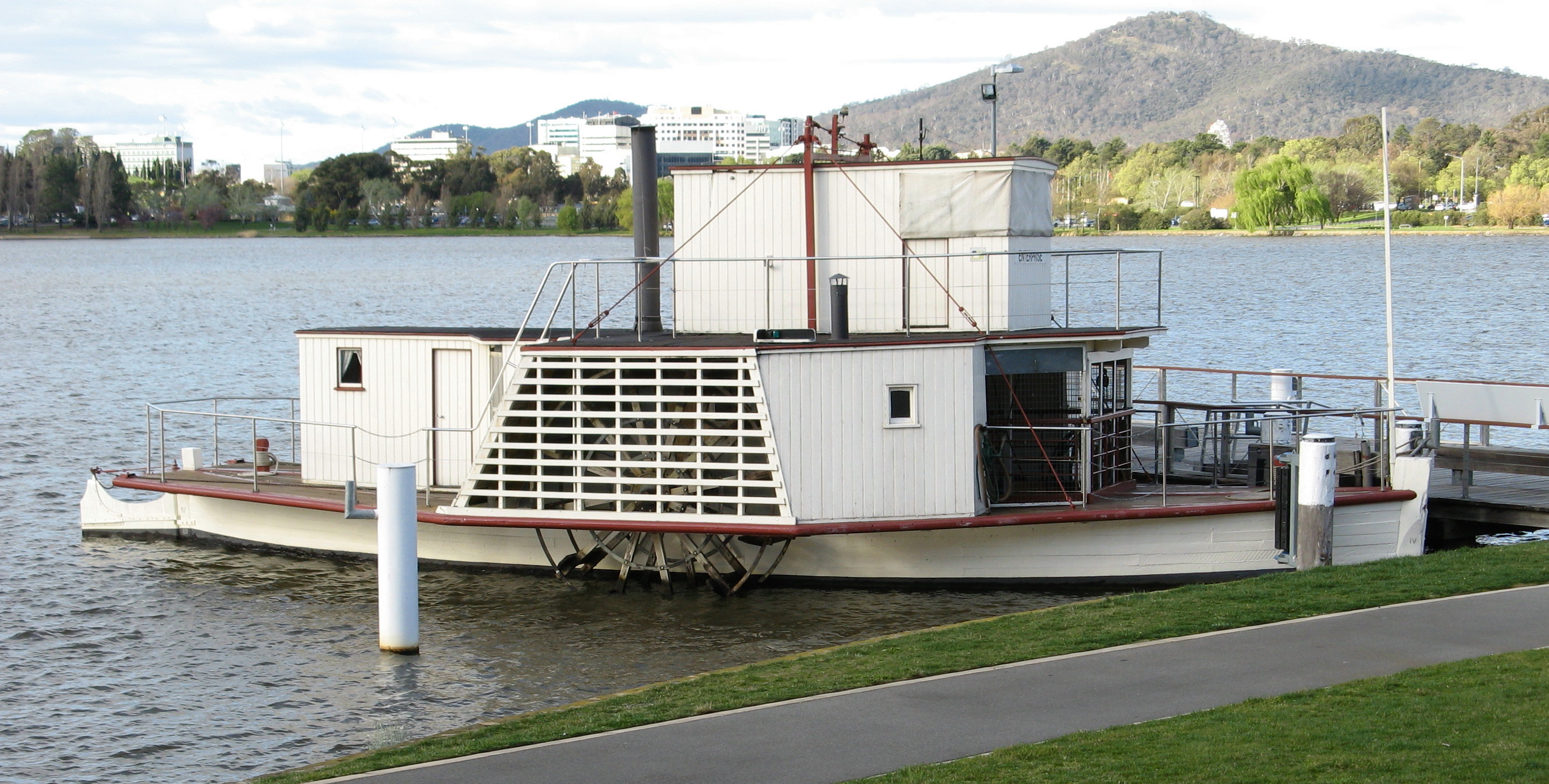

History
- Name: PS Enterprise
- Owner: National Museum of Australia
- Builder: William Keir
- Laid down: 1876
- Launched: 1878

General characteristics
- Type: Paddle steamer
- Tonnage: 55.9
- Displacement: 30–32 tonnes (33–35 tons)
- Length: 17.3 metres (57 ft)
- Beam: 4.6 metres (15 ft)
- Height: 5.9 metres (19 ft) (from waterline)
- Draught: 0.75 metres (2 ft 6 in)
- Installed power: Single expansion steam engine
- Propulsion: Paddle wheel
- Speed: 5 knots (9 km/h; 6 mph)
- Capacity: 25, including crew

PS Enterprise is an 1878 Australian paddle steamer, owned by the National Museum of Australia in Canberra. It is still operational and one of the oldest working paddle steamers in the world. It is listed on the Australian Register of Historic Vehicles.

Enterprise is built from river red gum wood; the engine is a two-cylinder single expansion steam engine made by the Beverley Iron and Wagon Company in the East Riding of Yorkshire, England in 1877. The original boiler was replaced in 1988. It is 17.3 metres (57 ft) long, 4.6 metres (15 ft) wide, and 5.9 metres (19 ft) high (from waterline). It has a shallow draft of 75 centimetres (30 in), allowing it to cope with the low water levels of the Australian rivers, and a maximum speed of 5 knots (9 km/h; 6 mph).

Enterprise was built in Echuca by William Keir between 1876 and 1878, and initially owned by his family, until they sold it in 1893. It changed hands several times over the years, and has been used as a cargo ship (towing barges), a store, a fishing boat and a houseboat, operating on the Murray, Darling and Murrumbidgee Rivers. From 1919 until 1945, it was owned by Augustus Creager, who, with his wife Hilda, raised a family of five children living on board.

In 1973, amidst a general renewed interest in steamboats, Enterprise was restored by enthusiast Graeme Niehus and his father, and subsequently raced against other paddle boats.

The National Museum of Australia bought Enterprise in 1984 and further restored it, including replacing the boiler. In 1988, as part of the Australian Bicentenary celebrations, it was recommissioned on Lake Burley Griffin in Canberra. It was opened to the public in January 1989.

On 4 December 1993, Enterprise was temporarily recommissioned as HMA PS Enterprise of the Royal Australian Navy and allowed to fly the White Ensign for the day, as part of the navy's Maritime Pageant.

Enterprise is operated by the museum – it is the largest functional object in the museum's collection – and crewed by volunteers. It undergoes regular maintenance and occasional restoration work.
