= AGA AB =

Former Swedish Gas Enterprise

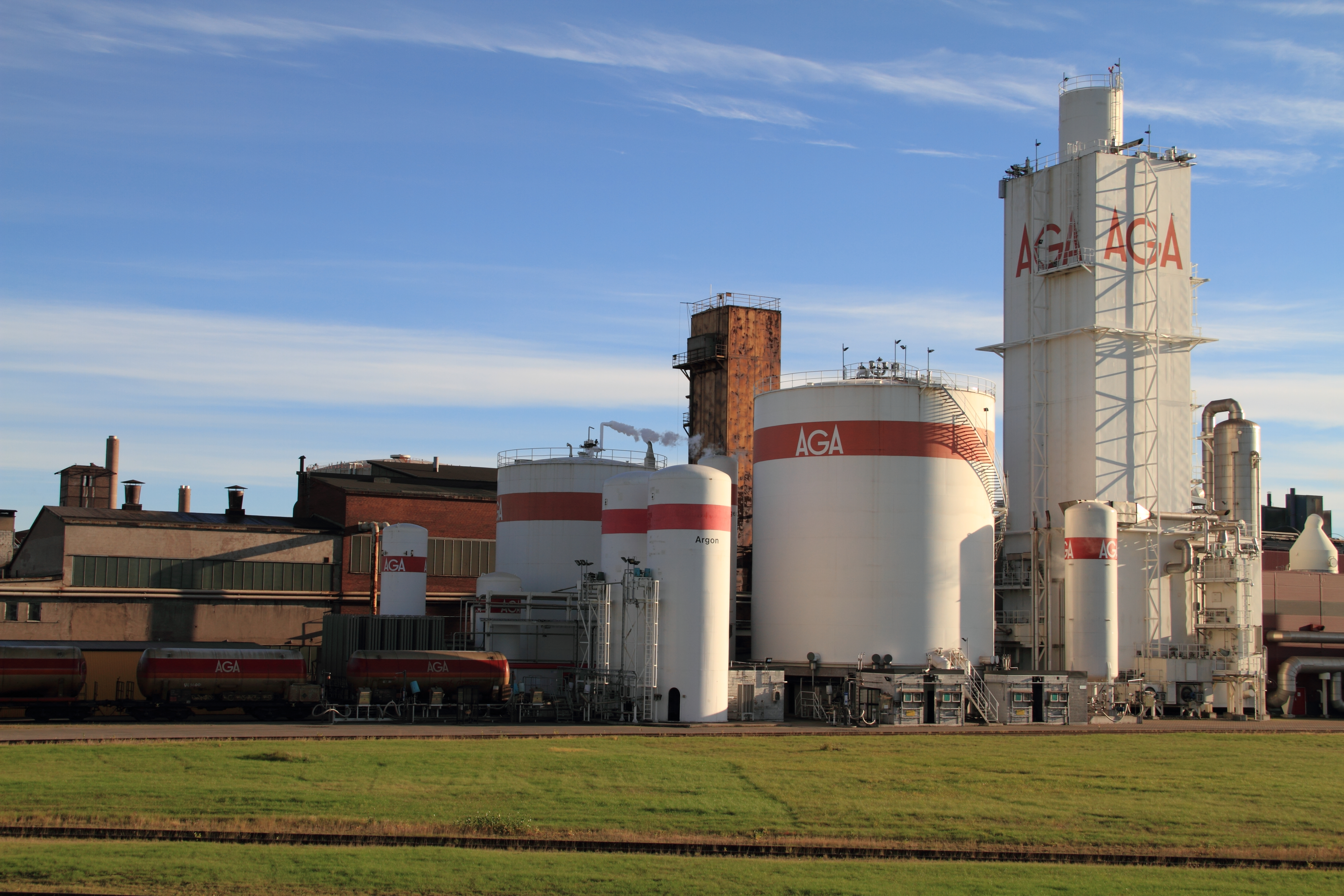
AGA Gas AB in Luleå, Sweden

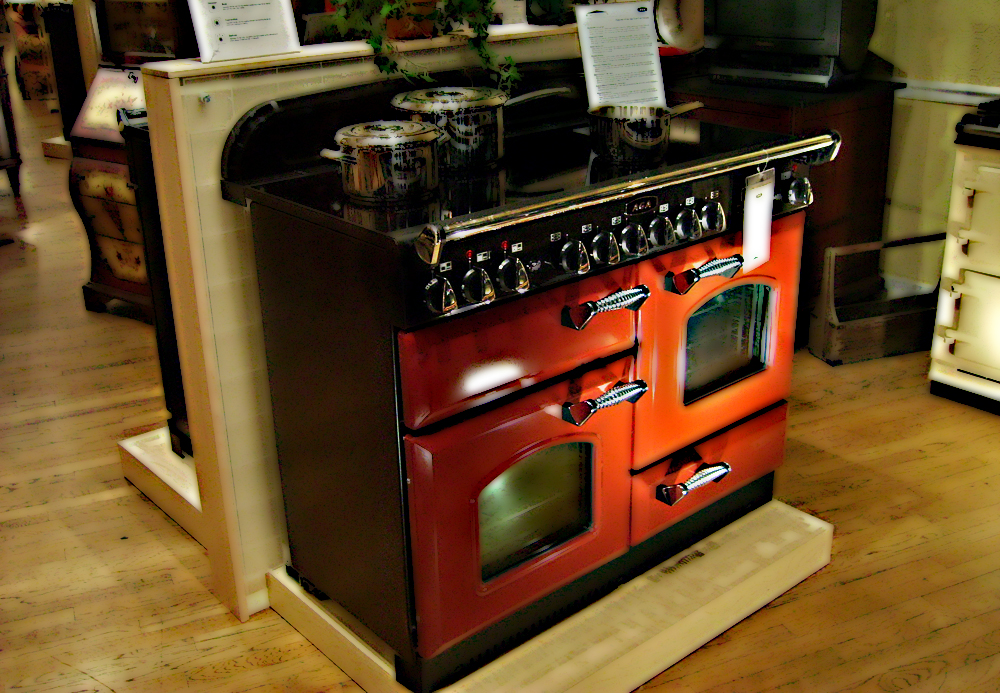
Stylized photograph of a modern AGA brand cooker

AGA AB, previously AB Gasaccumulator and AB Svenska Gasaccumulator, was a Swedish industrial gas company founded in 1904. Nobel Prize laureate Gustaf Dalén was an important part of the development of the company. Inventions included the AGA cooker and the Dalén light. In the 1990s, AGA conceived and developed HiQ for specialty gases. In 2000, AGA (which stands for Aktiebolaget Gas Accumulator) was integrated into Linde AG.
