= 1932 Moweaqua Coal Mine disaster =

Illinois industrial accident, 54 fatalities

Coordinates: 39°37′14.1″N 89°1′18.8″W

The Moweaqua Coal Mine disaster happened on December 24, 1932, in Moweaqua, Illinois. The disaster was caused by a methane gas explosion killing 54 miners. The explosion occurred shortly after the day shift started, sometime between 7:30 and 8:00 Christmas Eve morning.

Less than three years later (1935), the dangerous mine closed permanently. The Moweaqua Coal Mine Museum, founded in 1986, contains many mining artifacts that recall the disaster and the work of the miners.

== History of Moweaqua coal-mining industry ==
A large coal seam was first found in Moweaqua on October 3, 1889, after two months of drilling by the Samuel Warner and Son firm as reported in the Moweaqua Call-Mail, the local newspaper. Two years later in November the first mining shaft site was commissioned a few blocks from the railroad depot, but under a new drilling company called the Cochran Coal and Mining Company under James G. Cochran. Ground was broken for mine construction on December 21, 1891, on land bought from Mrs. M.K. Duncan and the Moweaqua Coal and Manufacturing Company was officially formed. The Moweaqua Call-Mail urged people living in the town to hold out for the coal they hoped to find because then they could buy the coal locally and it would be much cheaper for farmers and manufacturers. On August 30, 1892, three six-foot veins of coal were found in the mine 570 feet (170 m) below the Earth's surface and were sold in the market a few days later. The success of the mine increased over the coming months and by February 9, 1893, 25 tons (50,000–60,000 lb) of coal was being raised per day and sold at $1.25 for nut coal and $1.50 for lump coal. The mine also introduced plans to have steel fiber cables installed so they could lift eleven tons (22,000 lb) of coal at once. On August 8, 1894, the first mule was taken into the mine which allowed the mine to hire more workers to watch over the animals in the mine. By 1897, over 100 miners were working in the mine as cage men, motor men, mule drivers, shot firers, blacksmiths and miners. With the increasing number of workers in the mine, Catholic families began to express interest to build a church in Moweaqua and four lots were purchased from a man named Mr. Prescott to start a church. Many single men as well as families were drawn to Moweaqua over the years leading up to the 1932 Disaster because of the prosperous mine and the growing sense of community in the town, but the migrant workers ended up being disconnected from the community, and everyone kept to themselves.

== Disaster ==
On December 24, 1932, at 8:15 a.m., the whistle from the mine blew. People from the town began to gather outside the mine because they knew that the whistle meant that something went wrong at the work site. There was a methane gas explosion in the mine shaft a few minutes before they got there. It was later discovered in a state investigation published February 1, 1933, by the Moweaqua News that the disaster was caused by the open flame of a miner's carbide lamp which ignited the methane gas and prompted the explosion. Only about half of the miners were working that day as it was Christmas Eve and many chose to stay home with their families or were out of the town. 54 miners were trapped 625 feet (191 m) below the ground in the shaft. Two miners named Frank Floski and Ibra Adams did survive the accident because they were in a cage deeper in the mine. Specially trained rescue miners from Pana and Springfield arrived to help control the situation and retrieve bodies from the mine. When the other miners who had taken the day off arrived at the mine, they were not allowed in. The Illinois Central Railroad brought in cars to give the rescue miners a place to sleep and food to eat. The American Red Cross, the Moweaqua Hospital and people in the town also helped provide meals for the workers. The rescue miners worked for six days to find all of the bodies in the mine.

== Victims and after-effects ==
The owner of the mine, Mr. Shafer, said, "If the mine is reopened, every safety precaution would be taken of course. Upon the recommendation of the state mine inspector, nothing but electric safety lamps would be used in the future." The mine then reopened on December 28, 1933, after a service was held four days earlier to remember and honor the men who died in the disaster exactly one year before and to commemorate the rescue mine workers who helped uncover the bodies of the men trapped in the mine. The mine started up with success and by March 7, 1934, 65 men were back working in the mine again. In that year, a new company owned by Glen Shafer from Pana, Springfield called the Erie Sootless Coal Company of Moweaqua opened the mine after the summer. No coal was brought up after March 1935 and the shafts were officially closed in 1936, but were never sold. The tipple was mostly torn down by June 1940, and the remaining pieces of the structure blew over due to harsh winds and ruined the engine room five months later. The mine was finally destroyed in October 1941 due to rotting wood in the timbers holding up the mine walls and ceiling and the shaft collapsed on itself creating a sink hole 80 ft (24 m) wide.

== Museum and film ==
A museum was set up in Moweaqua to honor and remember the men who both lost their lives in the 1932 coal-mine disaster as well as any other men who served in the mines. It was also created to educate the public about the mining industry that dominated the Moweaquan economy in the late 1800s and early 1900s. The museum was dedicated on May 25, 1986. It houses a number of artifacts and documents, including tools, newspaper clippings and photographs, and coal specimens from the mine. The museum is free for all visitors and is open seven days a week.

A documentary film funded by the Illinois State Library was made in 2008 and can be borrowed from the public library in Moweaqua. The film was written by Ruth Shasteen, edited by Paul A. Brooks, and produced and directed by Andrew R. Moore.
