= Stenstorp =

- Location within Västra Götaland Location within Sweden
- Coordinates: 58°16′28″N 13°42′49″E
- Country: Sweden
- Province: Västergötland
- County: Västra Götaland County
- Municipality: Falköping Municipality

Area
  - Total: 1.66 km^{2} (0.64 sq mi)

Population (31 December 2010)
  - Total: 1,668
  - Density: 1,005/km^{2} (2,600/sq mi)
- Time zone: UTC+1 (CET)
  - Summer (DST): UTC+2 (CEST)
- Climate: Dfb

Stenstorp is a locality situated in Falköping Municipality, Västra Götaland County, Sweden. It had 1,668 inhabitants in 2010.

== Railways ==
The Western Main Line (Swedish: Västra stambanan) runs through Stenstorp and regional passenger trains from Gothenburg and Jönköping stop there. The travel time to the two closest cities, Falköping in the south and Skövde to the north, is about 10 minutes each. Between the 1870s and the 1960s, Stenstorp was a railway junction, as two 891 mm narrow gauge railways to Lidköping (westward) and Hjo (eastward) met there and connected to the state-owned Western Main Line.
