= Gustaf Dalén =

Swedish engineer and inventor (1869–1937)

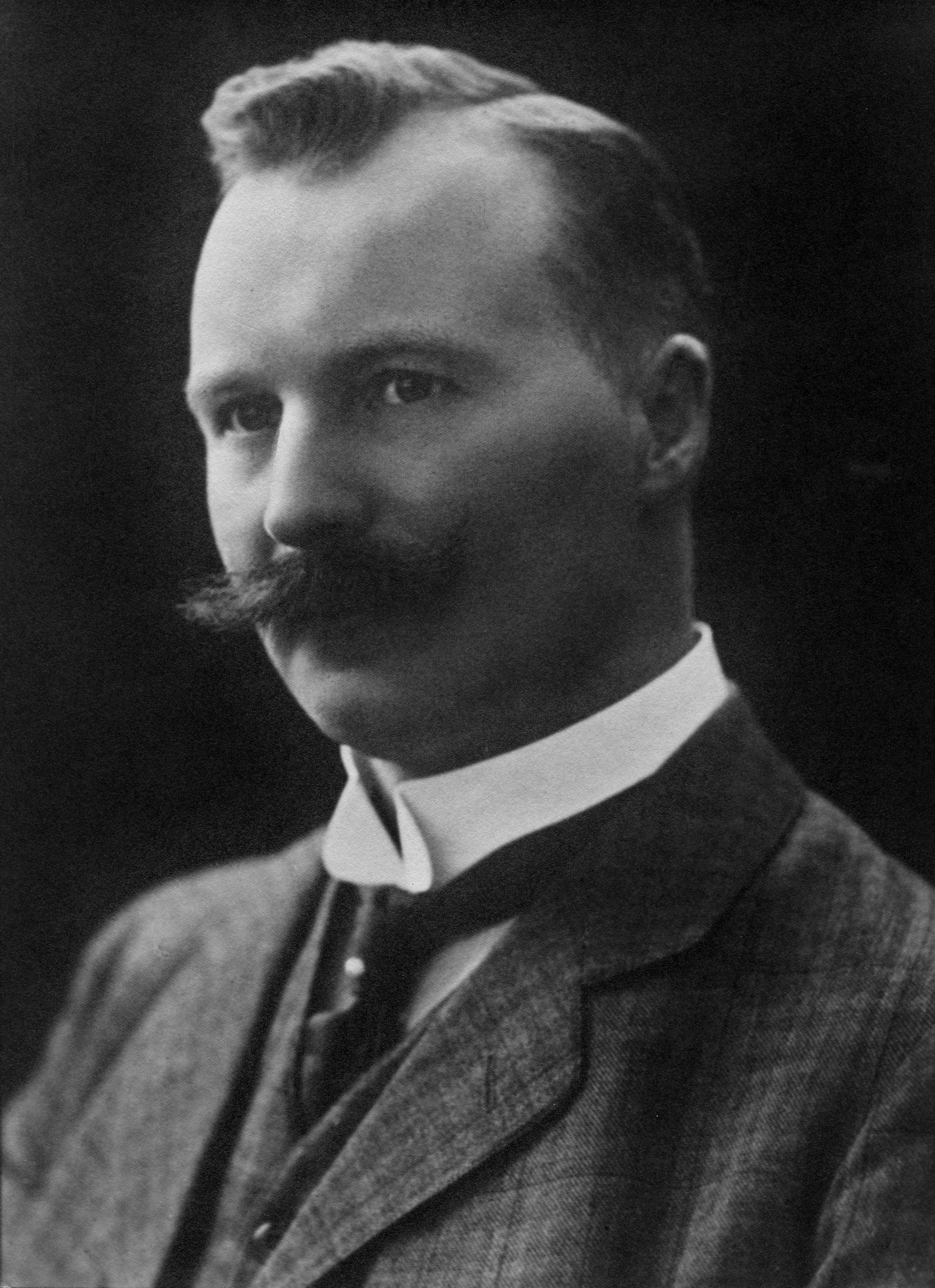
- Dalén in 1912
- Born: Nils Gustaf Dalén; 30 November 1869; Stenstorp, Sweden
- Died: 9 December 1937 (aged 68); Lidingö, Sweden
- Education: Chalmers University of Technology (grad. 1896)
- Years active: 1906–1937
- Employer: AGA
- Known for: Dalén light; AGA cooker
- Spouse: Elma Persson (m. 1901)
- Children: 4
- Awards: Nobel Prize in Physics (1912)

Nils Gustaf Dalén (Swedish: [ˈɡɵ̂sːtav daˈleːn]; 30 November 1869 – 9 December 1937) was a Swedish engineer and inventor who received the Nobel Prize in Physics in 1912 "for his invention of automatic regulators for use in conjunction with gas accumulators for illuminating lighthouses and buoys."

== Early life ==
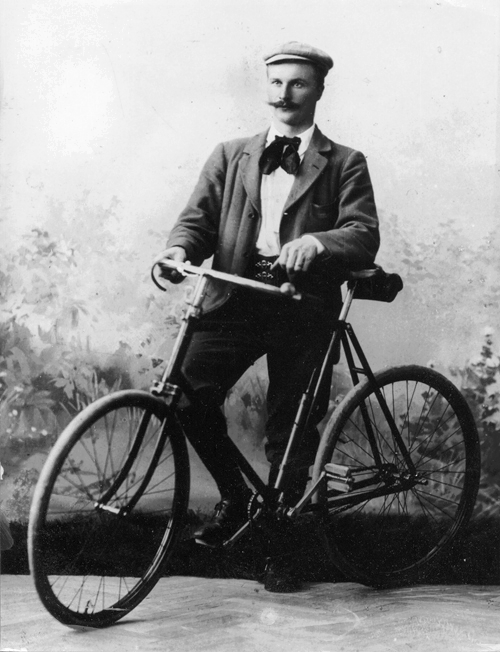
Gustaf Dalén as a young engineer with his bicycle in the photo studio, 1895.

Nils Gustaf Dalén was born on 30 November 1869 in Stenstorp, Sweden. He managed the family farm, which he expanded to include a market garden, a seed merchants and a dairy. In 1892 he invented a milk-fat tester to check milk quality of the milk delivered and went to Stockholm to show his new invention for Gustaf de Laval. de Laval was impressed by the self-taught Dalén and the invention and encouraged him to get a basic technical education. He was admitted to the Chalmers University of Technology, where he graduated in 1896. Dalén was much the same type of inventor as Gustaf de Laval, not afraid of testing "impossible" ideas, but Dalén was much more careful with the company economy. The products should have a solid market place before he introduced a new product.

== Career with AGA ==
In 1906, Dalén became chief engineer at the Gas Accumulator Company (manufacturer and distributor of acetylene) and in 1909 when AGA was founded, he was appointed the managing director for the company. During his life, AGA was one of the most innovative companies in Sweden and produced a large variety of products that grew every year. Finally in the early 1970s AGA was forced to reduce the number of markets it was involved in and concentrate on the production of gases for industrial use.

In 1909, Dalén ascended to the position of managing director of the renamed company Svenska Aktiebolaget Gasaccumulator (AGA). AGA developed lighthouses using Dalén's products. In 1910 the company bought a large real estate in Lidingö and built a production plant that was completed around 1912, when they moved out from the facilities in Stockholm.

=== Dalén light ===
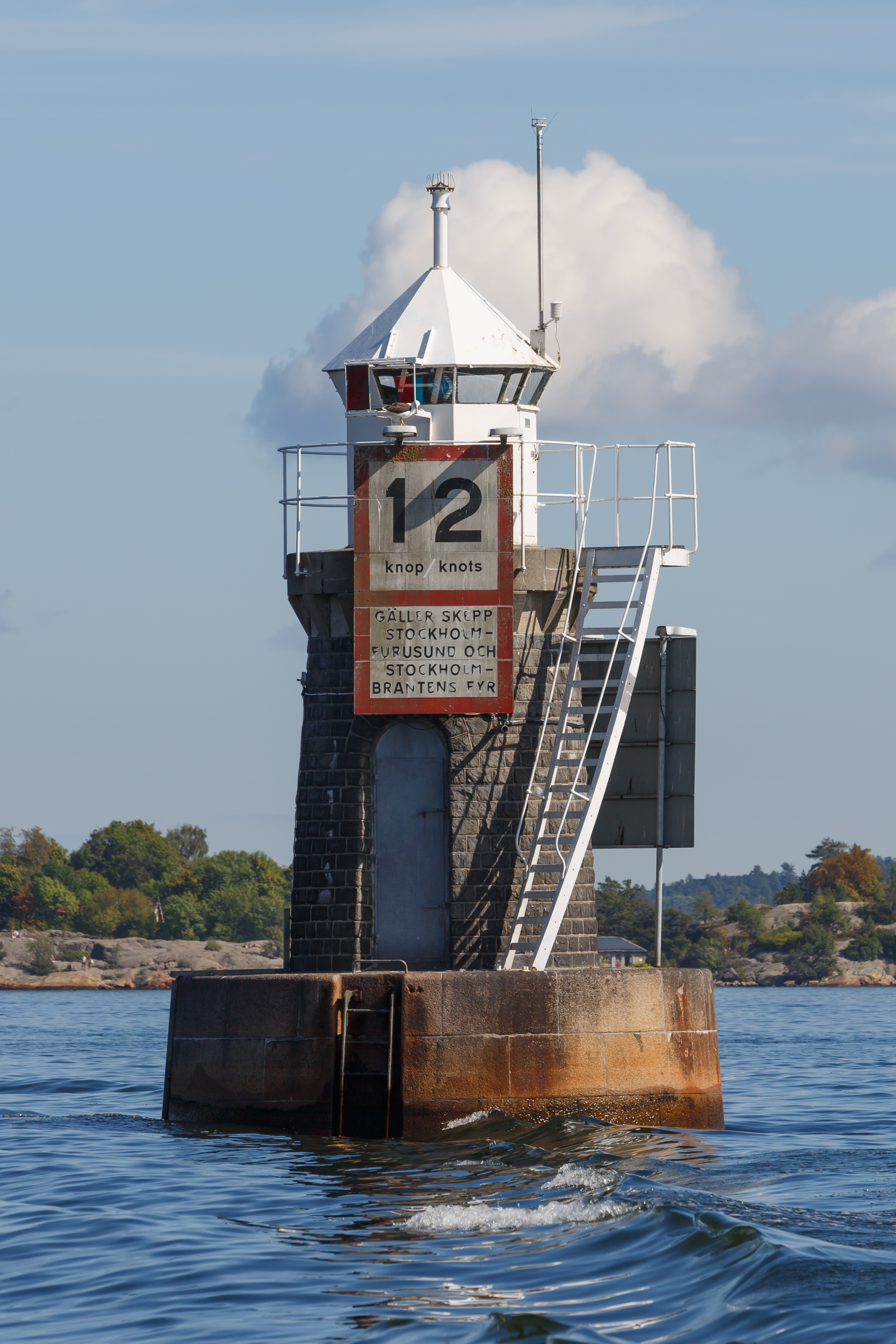
The AGA lighthouse "Blockhusudden" close to Stockholm, initially set up in 1912. When the lighthouse was electrified in 1980 it was determined that the sun valve had been working continuously since 1912 without the need for an overhaul.

Initially Dalén worked with acetylene (IUPAC: ethyne), a flammable and sometimes explosive hydrocarbon gas. Dalén invented Agamassan (Aga), a substrate used to absorb the gas allowing safe storage and hence commercial exploitation.

Acetylene produced an ultra-bright white light which superseded the less bright LPG as the fuel of choice for lighthouse illumination.

Dalén exploited the new fuel, developing the Dalén light which incorporated another invention, the sun valve. This device allowed the light to operate only at night, conserving fuel, and extending their service life to over a year.

The 'Dalen Flasher' was a device that, except for a small pilot light, only consumed gas during the flash stage. This reduced gas consumption by more than 90%. The AGA lighthouse equipment worked without any type of electric supply and was thus extremely reliable.

To a rugged coastal area like Scandinavia, his mass-produced, robust, minimal maintenance buoys were a significant boon to safety and livelihood. AGA Lighthouses covered the entire Panama Canal.

=== AGA cooker ===
In 1922, Dalén patented his invention of the AGA cooker. Most of the testing for the cooker was made in his private kitchen in his Villa Ekbacken that was built when AGA moved to Lidingö in 1912. His family helped him with the development work, checking temperatures, airflow etc., as the development work proceeded.

== Personal life ==
His parents were Anders and Lovisa Dalén. He married Elma Persson in 1901. They had four children, two daughters and two sons:

- Maja, married Silfverstolpe (1904–1995)
- Gunnar (1905–1970)
- Anders (1907–1994)
- Inga-Lisa, married Keen (1910–2004)

=== The accident in 1912 ===
Early in 1912, Dalén was blinded in an acetylene explosion during a test of maximum pressure for the accumulators. Later the same year he was awarded the Nobel Prize in Physics for his work on lighthouse technology. Too ill to attend the presentation, Dalén had his brother, ophthalmologist Professor Albin Dalén of the Caroline Institute, stand in his place.

The presentation speech praised the quality of sacrificing personal safety in scientific experimentation, a compliment that compared Dalén with Alfred Nobel himself. Despite his blindness, Dalén controlled AGA until his death in 1937. He received over 100 patents during his lifetime.

Dalén died on 9 December 1937 at the age of 68.

== Honours and awards ==
- Nobel Prize in Physics, 1912
- Member of the Royal Swedish Academy of Sciences
- Member of the Academy of Science and Engineering

== Image gallery ==
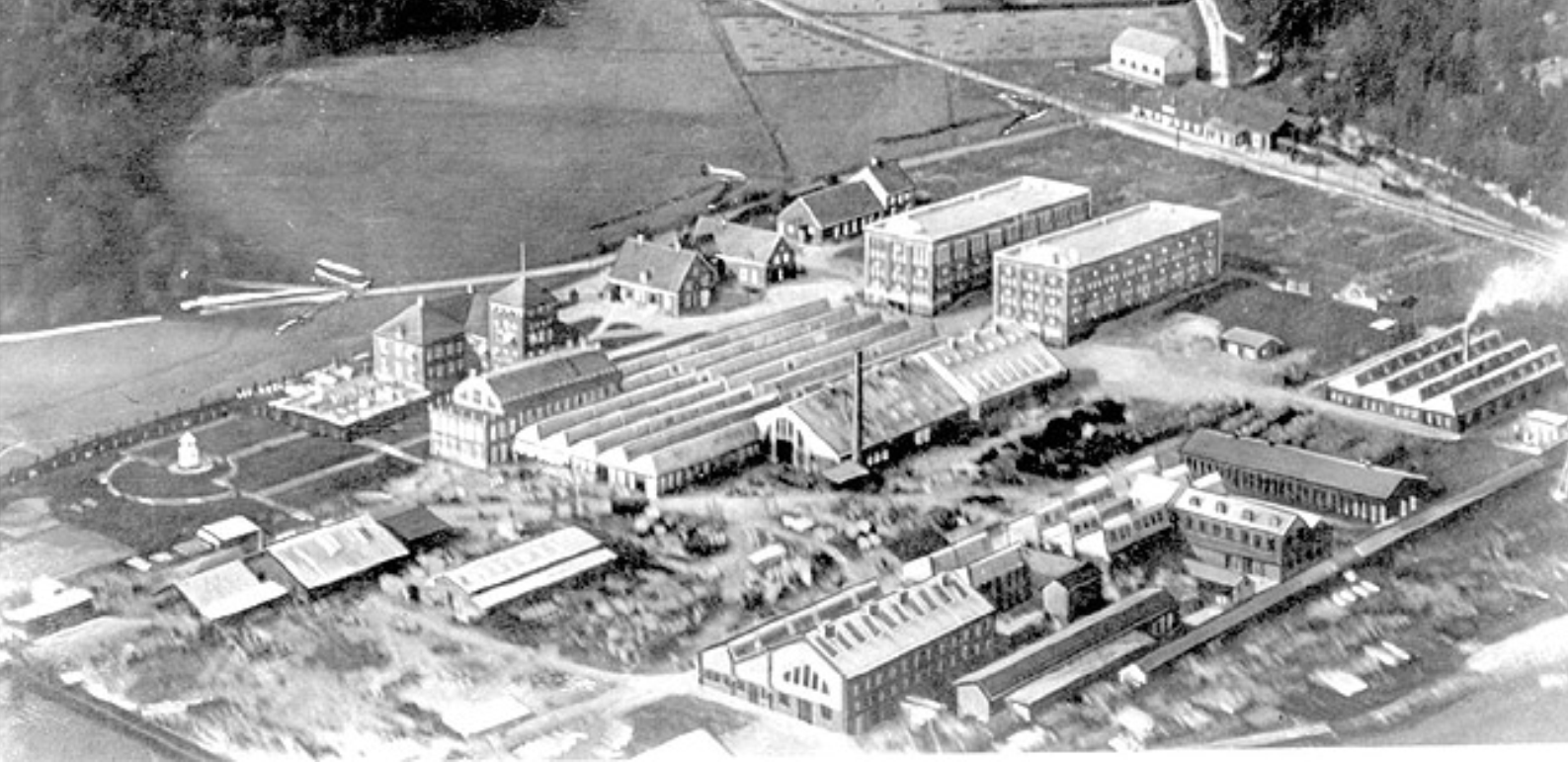
The AGA production and development center around 1920.

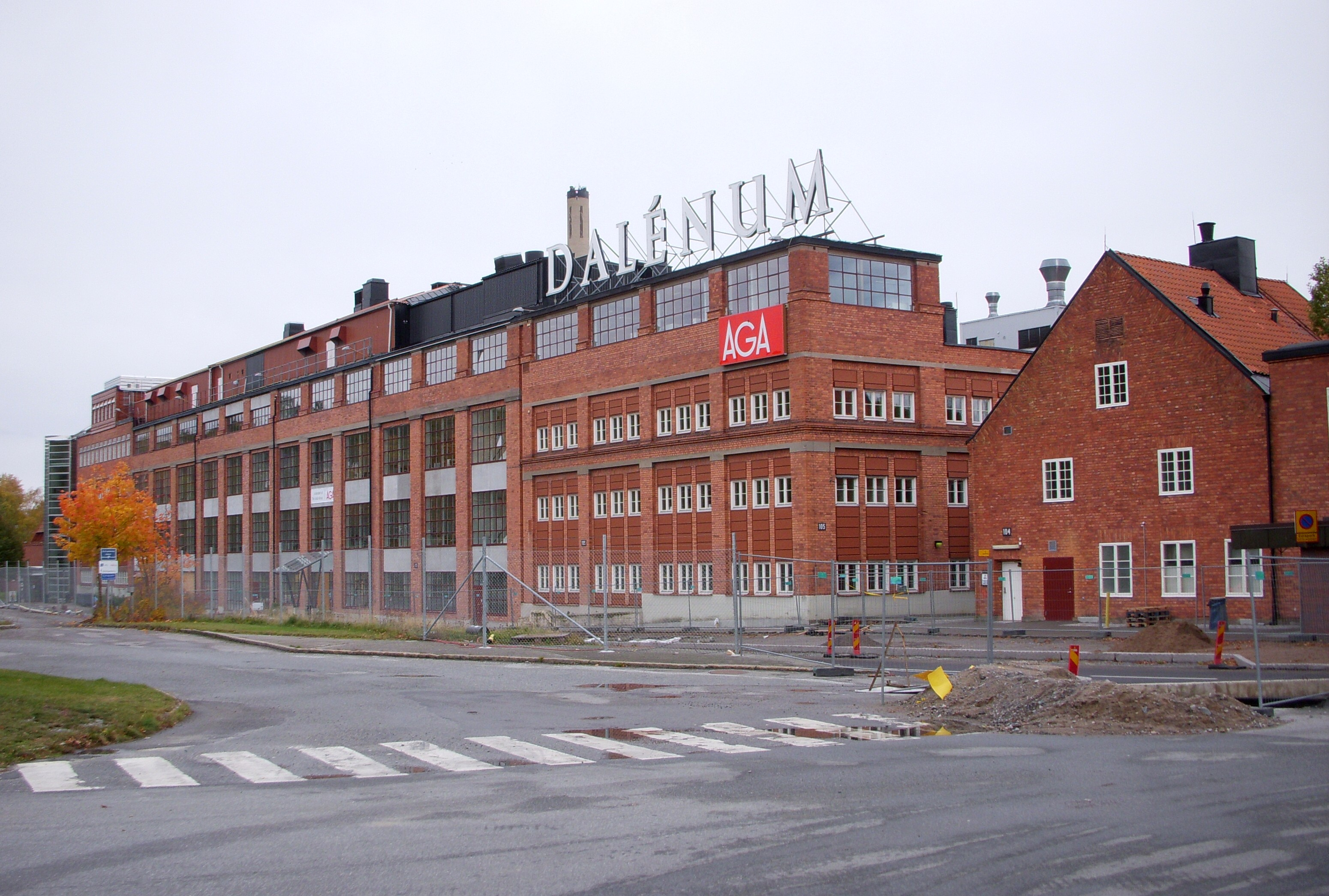
Some of the remaining AGA-buildings, today working as a center for small companies. The AGA head office with about 150 employees is still in some of the buildings. Photo: October 2009.

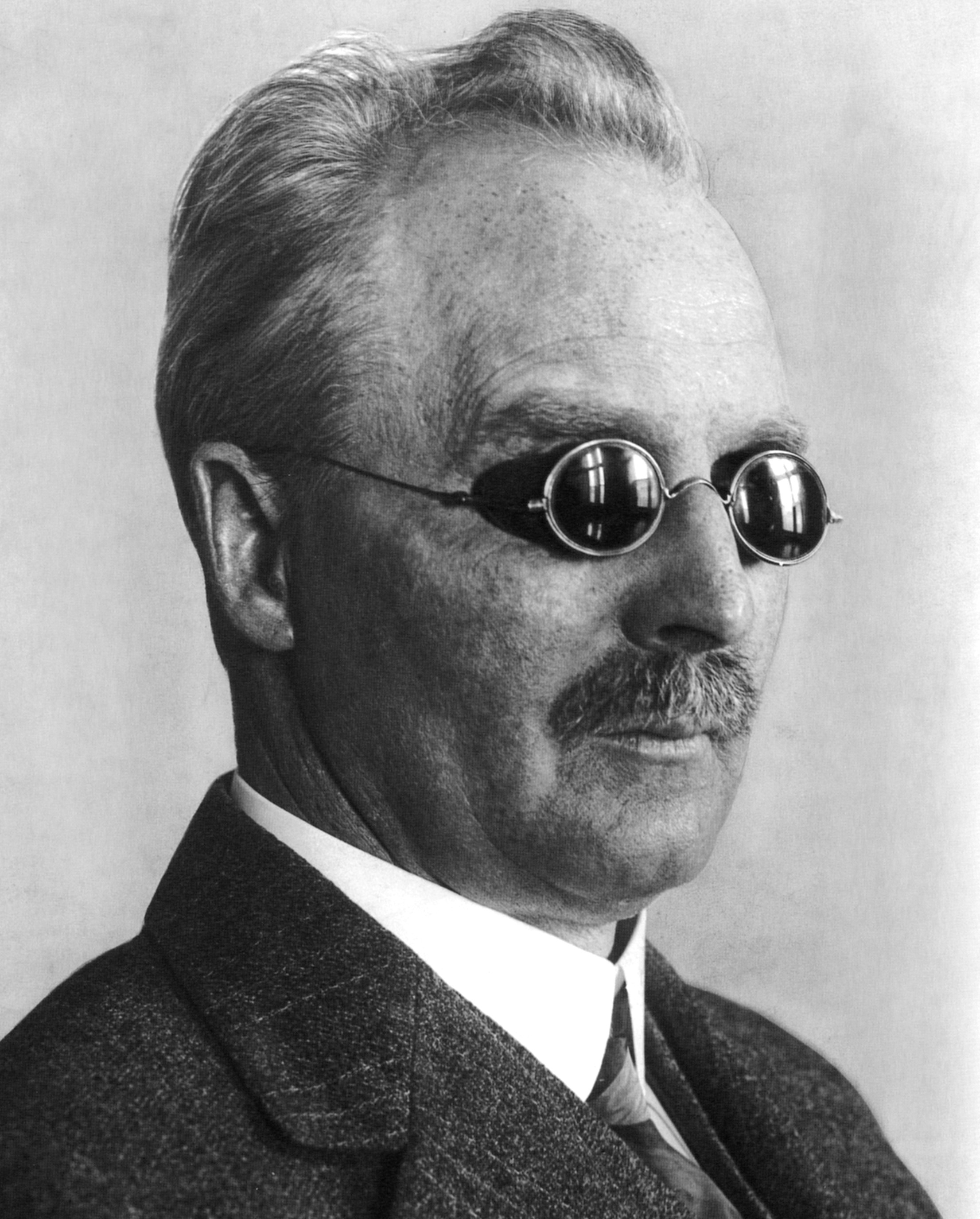
Gustaf Dalén, 1926 at the peak of his career as the managing director for AGA industry.

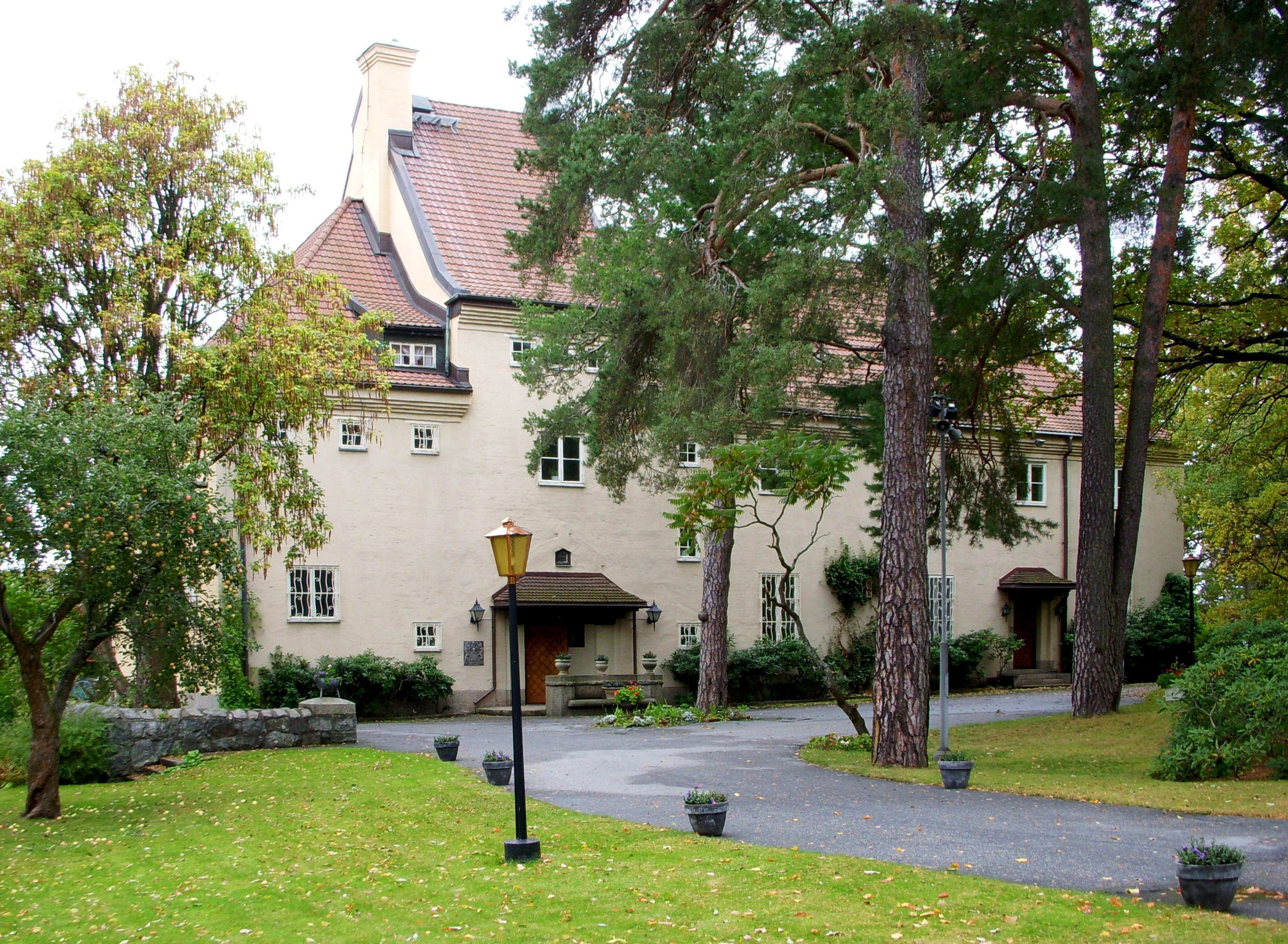
Villa Ekbacken, the private residence for the Dalén family, built in 1912 close to AGA production plant. Today the residence for Canada's ambassador in Sweden.

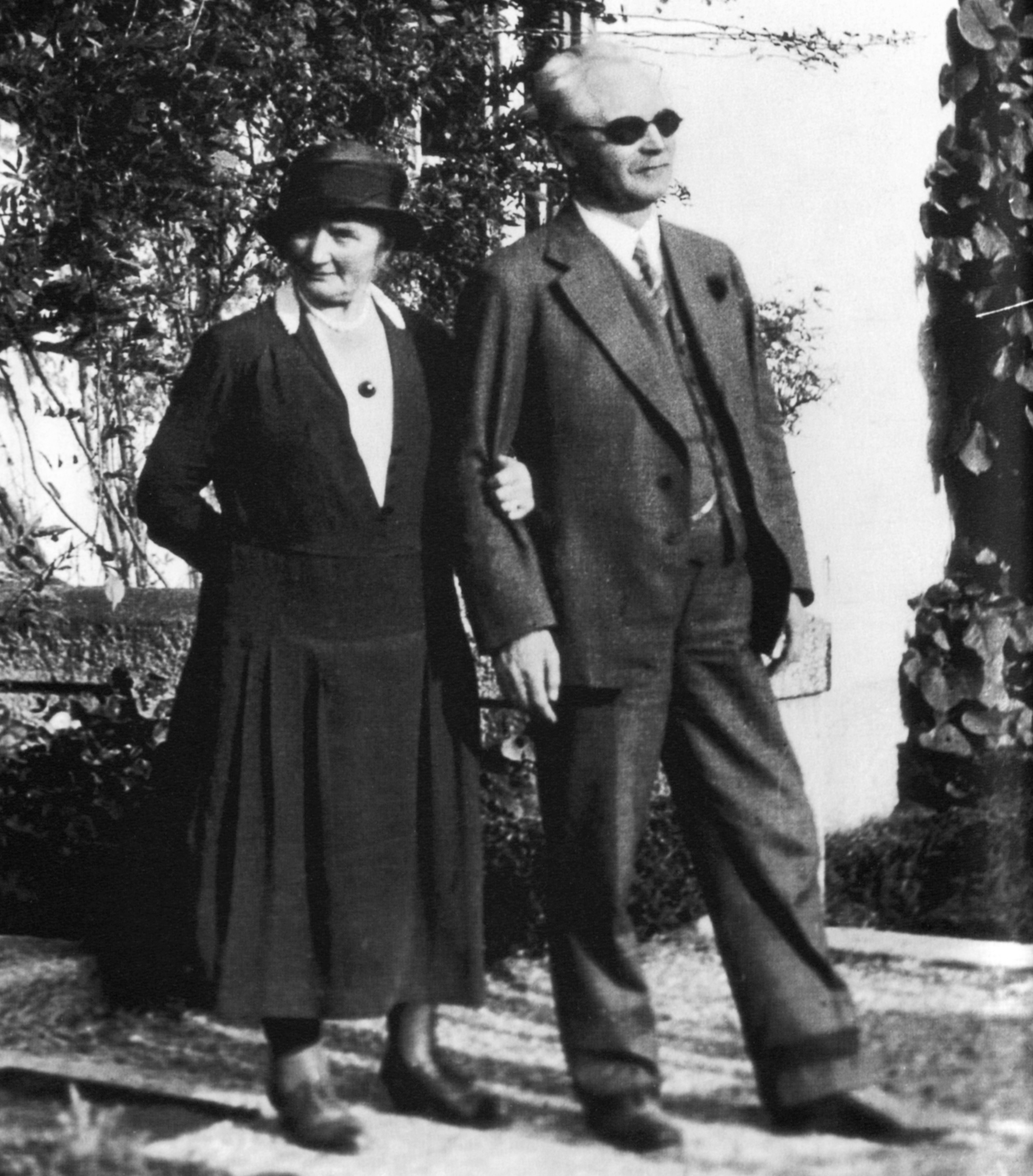
Gustaf Dalén and his wife Elma, outside Villa Ekbacken, 1937.
