= Dalén light =

Automatic controlled acetylene gas lighthouse

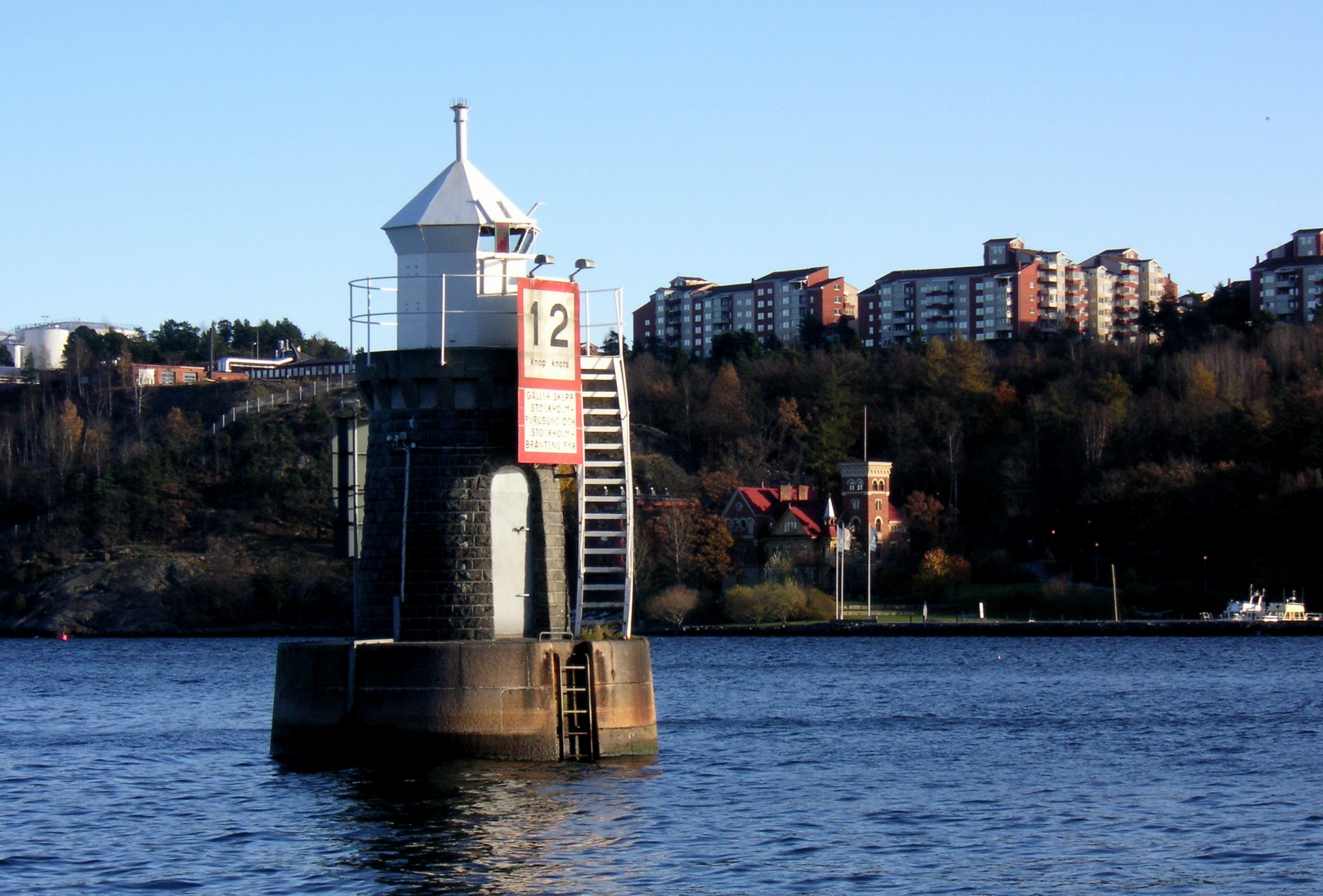
AGA light near Djurgården in Stockholm

A Dalén light is a flashing light produced from burning of carbide gas (acetylene), combined with a solar sensor which automatically operates the light only during darkness.

== Overview ==
In the last quarter of the 19th century navigation buoys began to be illuminated, however at first the lights were fixed (continuous) and could be mistaken for ship's navigation lights. Gustaf Dalén invented a valve which could be adjusted to deliver pulses of acetylene into the lamp. A pilot light, which burns continuously, then ignited them. The pattern of flashes (known as the light's characteristic) can be set by screw adjustments. The invention of this system resulted in Dalén being awarded the 1912 Nobel Prize in Physics. Gas was wasted however due to illumination during the day and subsequently Dalén developed the sun valve to shut off the flashes during daylight.

The technology was a form of light source in lighthouses from the 1900s through the 1960s, when electric lighting had become dominant. Dalén later invented the AGA cooker in 1922 whilst recuperating from an accident with acetylene which blinded him. The carbide lamp was developed in the early 1900s. While the lamps proved useful in many applications, the problem of safely storing acetylene meant they needed regular refilling which constrained their use in applications such as lighthouses.

== Examples ==
Lighthouses using Dalén lighting have included:

- Barrenjoey Lighthouse, New South Wales (1932–1972)
- Peninsula Point Light (1922–1936) Upper Peninsula Michigan United States
- Point Stephens Light, New South Wales (1922–1960)
- Celarain Lighthouse, Mexico (1934 – )
- Skerryvore Lighthouse, the Hebrides ( –1959)
- Recalada a Bahía Blanca Light, Argentina (1928–1974)
