= List of lighthouses and lightvessels in Sweden =

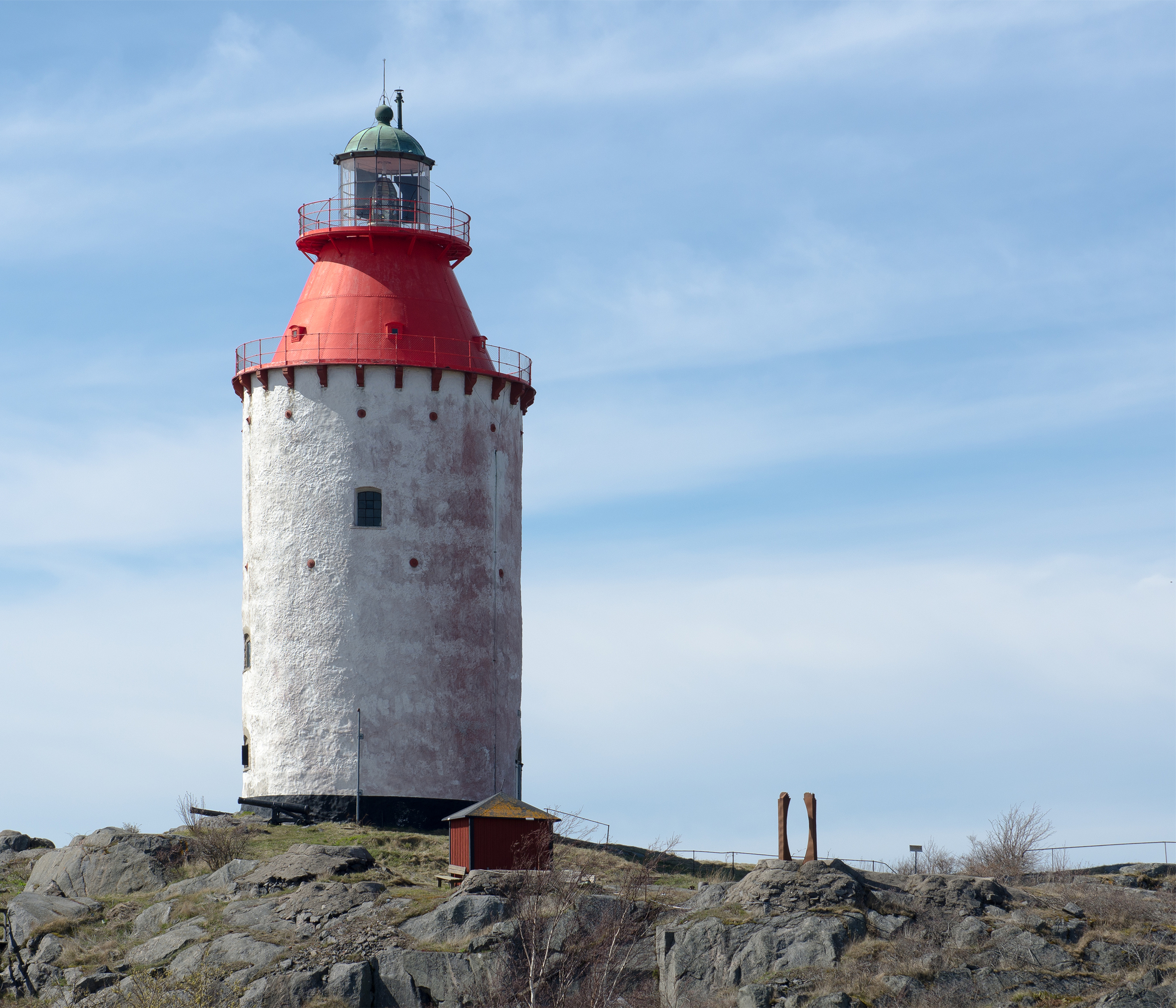
Landsort lighthouse

This is a list of lighthouses and lightvessels in Sweden.

== Lightvessels ==
- Almagrundet
- Old Finngrundet lightvessel, now a museum ship
- Fladen

== Lighthouses ==
- Agö, Hälsingland
- Bergudden, Västerbotten
- Bjuröklubb, Västerbotten
- Brämön, Ångermanland
- Bönan, Gästrikland
- Djursten, Uppland
- Eggegrund, Gästrikland
- Falsterbo Lighthouse, Scania
- Falsterborev, Scania
- Faludden, Gotland
- Finngrundet, Uppland
- Fårö Lighthouse, Gotland
- Garpen, Småland
- Gotska Sandön, Gotland
- Grundkallen, Uppland
- Grönskär, Södermanland
- Gåsören, Västerbotten
- Hallands Väderö, Scania
- Hanö, Blekinge
- Hoburgen, Gotland
- Holmögadd, Ångermanland
- Huvudskär, Södermanland
- Hållö, Bohuslän
- Häradskär, Östergötland
- Hätteberget, Bohuslän
- Högbonden, Ångermanland
- Högby Lighthouse, Öland
- Kapelludden, Öland
- Kullen Lighthouse, Kullaberg, Scania
- Landsort, Södermanland
- Lungö, Ångermanland
- Långe Erik, Öland
- Långe Jan, Öland
- Malören, Norrbotten
- Morups Tånge, Halland
- Måseskär, Bohuslän
- Naven, Vänern
- Nidingen, Halland
- När Lighthouse, Gotland
- Pater Noster Lighthouse, Bohuslän
- Pite-Rönnskär, Västerbotten
- Rataskär, Västerbotten
- Revengegrundet, Södermanland
- Rödkallen, Norrbotten
- Sandhammaren, Scania
- Skagsudde, Ångermanland
- Smygehuk Lighthouse, Scania
- Stenkyrkehuk, Gotland
- Stora Fjäderägg, Ångermanland
- Stora Karlsö, Gotland
- Storjungfrun, Hälsingland
- Storkläppen, Östergötland
- Svartklubben, Uppland
- Svenska Björn
- Svenska Högarna, Uppland
- Sydostbrotten
- Söderarm, Uppland
- Tistlarna, Halland
- Tjärven, Uppland
- Ursholmen, Bohuslän
- Understen, Uppland
- Utklippan, Blekinge
- Vinga Lighthouse, Bohuslän
- Väderöbod, Bohuslän
- Örskär, Uppland
- Östergarnsholm, Gotland

== See also ==
- Lighthouse
- Lists of lighthouses and lightvessels
- List of islands of Sweden
