= List of lightvessels =

This article lists lightvessels around the world. Most surviving light vessels reside in the United Kingdom and the United States. Some of the lightvessels mentioned in the lists have been renamed more than once, while others have been re-stationed or captured in war. Lightvessels were also not as permanent as a building or structure which helped lead to the replacement of others.

== Europe ==
Name	Image	Country	Location Coordinates	Year built	Year deactivated	Fate
Almagrundet		Sweden	Sandhamn; 59°16′N 19°31′E	1896	1964	Replaced in 1964, likely scrapped.
Amorina	—N/a	Sweden	—N/a	1934	1970	Refitted into a Barquentine in 1979, used for racing.
Mayor Abendroth		Germany	53.32269°N 8.34395°E	1908	1927	Museum ship
Fehmarnbelt Lightship		Germany	Schleswig-Holstein	1908	1985	Retired
Fladen		Sweden	Gothenburg; 57.70864°N 11.96036°E	1915	1969	Museum ship at Gothenburg
FS1		Germany	54°10.8′N 007°27.5′E or 54°09.9′N 006°20.7′E or in Wilhelmshaven during maintenance	1983		In service
FS3	—N/a	Germany	54°10.8′N 007°27.5′E or 54°09.9′N 006°20.7′E or in Wilhelmshaven during maintenance	1986		In service
FS4	—N/a	Germany	54°10.8′N 007°27.5′E or 54°09.9′N 006°20.7′E or in Wilhelmshaven during maintenance	1988		In service
Fs Kalkgrund II		Germany	—N/a	1910	1963	Re-named S/V Noorderlicht in 1992, continues to operate as a cruise vessel.
Hyöky		Finland	Tervasaari, harbor of Hamina	1912	1959	Sold to private owner
Kemi		Finland		1901	1975	Museum ship
Lightship Finngrundet		Sweden	Stockholm; 59°19′38.4″N 18°5′25.5″E	1903	1969	Museum ship
Lightvessel Gedser Rev		Denmark	Gedser Odde; 55.6800°N 12.5897°E	1895	1972	Museum ship at Nyhavn, Copenhagen
Lightvessel I	—N/a	Denmark	Horns Rev	1913	1980	Museum ship in Esbjerg.
Lightvessel XI		Denmark	—N/a	1878	Unknown	Sold to private owner
Lightvessel XXI	—N/a	Denmark	—N/a	1911	1988	Floating café in Ebeltoft.
Relandersgrund		Finland	Helsinki Harbour	1888	Unknown	Retired, and docked in Helsinki as a restaurant ship (2003)
Suriname-Rivier		Suriname	Fort Nieuw-Amsterdam	1910	1964	Permanently berthed, and in serious disrepair at a wet dock in Suriname.
West-Hinder I	—N/a	Belgium	Nieuwpoort; 51°07′28.6″N 4°17′27.2″E	1950	1972	Museum ship in Rupelmonde
West-Hinder II		Belgium	Nieuwpoort; 51°20′03.9″N 3°12′29.5″E	1950	1994	Berthed on dry land in a theme park at the Zeebrugge water front.
West-Hinder III		Belgium	Nieuwpoort; 51°13′46.5″N 4°24′16.3″E	1950	1992	Donated to the city of Antwerp in 1995.

== Elsewhere ==
Name	Image	Country	Location Coordinates	Year built	Year deactivated	Fate
Bras d'Or	—N/a	Canada	—N/a	1926	1939	Reported as missing in 1940.
CLS-4 Carpentaria		Australia	Sydney	1917	1985	Museum ship in Sydney

== See also ==
- Lists of lighthouses
