= Högbonden =

Lighthouse and island in Sweden

Högbonden Lighthouse
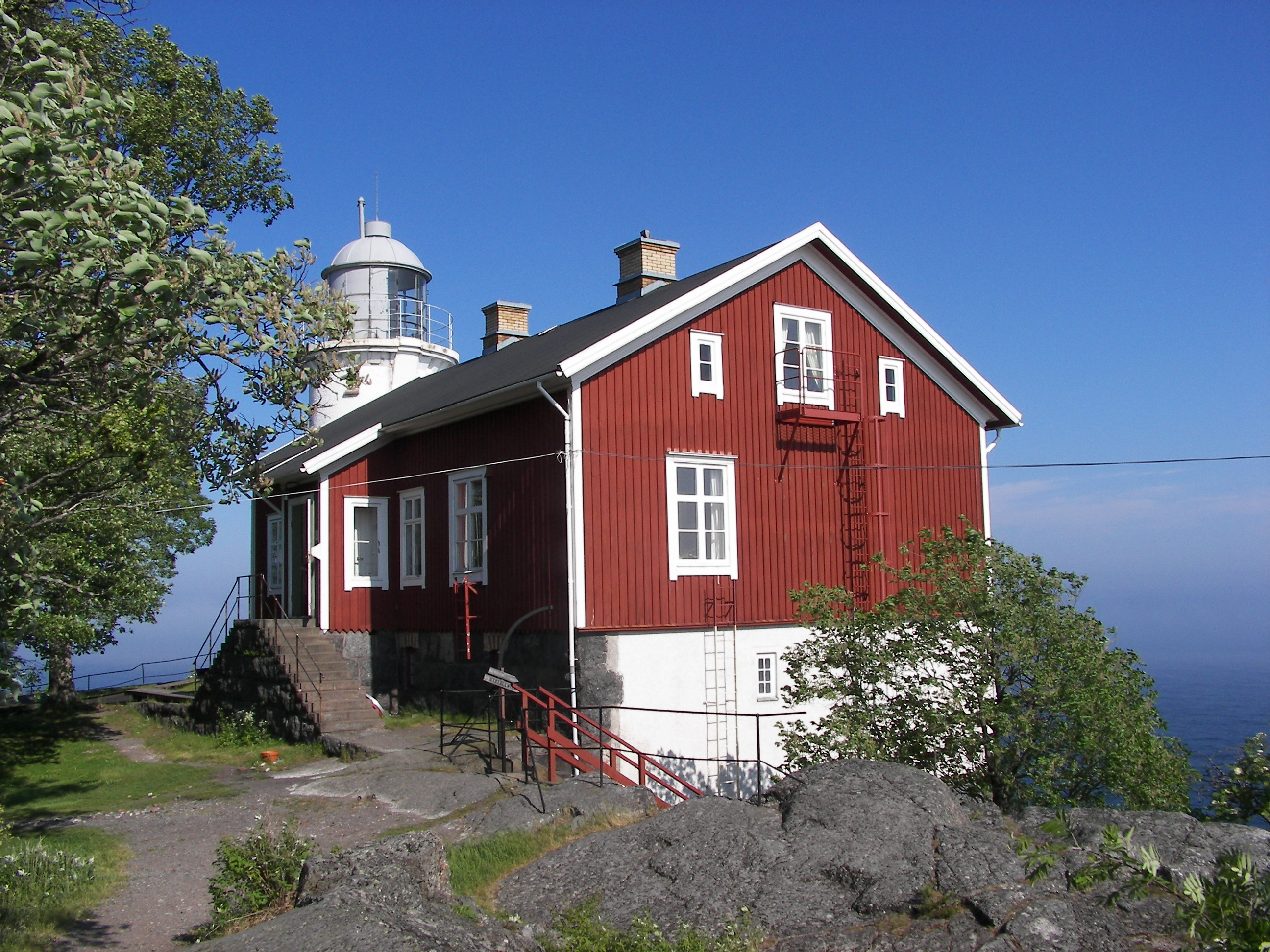
- Högbonden Lighthouse
- Location: Högbonden Island, east of Bönhamn, Ångermanland; Sweden
- Coordinates: 62.865948°N 18.478167°E

Tower
- Constructed: 1909
- Foundation: concrete
- Construction: cast iron tower
- Automated: 1963
- Height: 14 metres (46 ft)
- Shape: cylindrical tower with balcony and lantern attached to a 2-storey keeper's house
- Markings: white tower
- Power source: kerosene, acetylene, electricity
- Operator: Swedish Maritime Administration (Sjöfartsverket)
- Heritage: governmental listed building complex, governmental listed building

Light
- First lit: 18 October 1909
- Focal height: 75 metres (246 ft)
- Lens: 2nd order Fresnel lens (original), small aerobeacon (current)
- Range: white: 18 nautical miles (33 km; 21 mi) red: 15 nautical miles (28 km; 17 mi) green: 13 nautical miles (24 km; 15 mi)
- Characteristic: Fl (4) W 12s.
- Sweden no.: SV-1317

Högbonden is a Swedish island and lighthouse located in the World Heritage Site Höga kusten. From springtime in May through October a hostel is open to visitors in the old lightkeeper's house. In the summer season there is regular daily boat service from Bönhamn to Högbonden. The whole island is a nature reserve.

== History ==
The lighthouse was built after complaints that there were no lighthouses between Lungö and Skagsudde. It is the second-highest placed lighthouse in Sweden (after Kullen Lighthouse), and it was also one of the most powerful. In November 2010 the old lens was finally retired and the power source changed to solar cell-power. The light now consists of a small white light on the balcony's railing and the red and green sectors were removed. As of 2012 the tower is in bad condition and in need of repairs. It is owned by the Swedish Maritime Administration.

== See also ==
- List of lighthouses and lightvessels in Sweden
