= Högby Lighthouse =

Högby lighthouse Högby
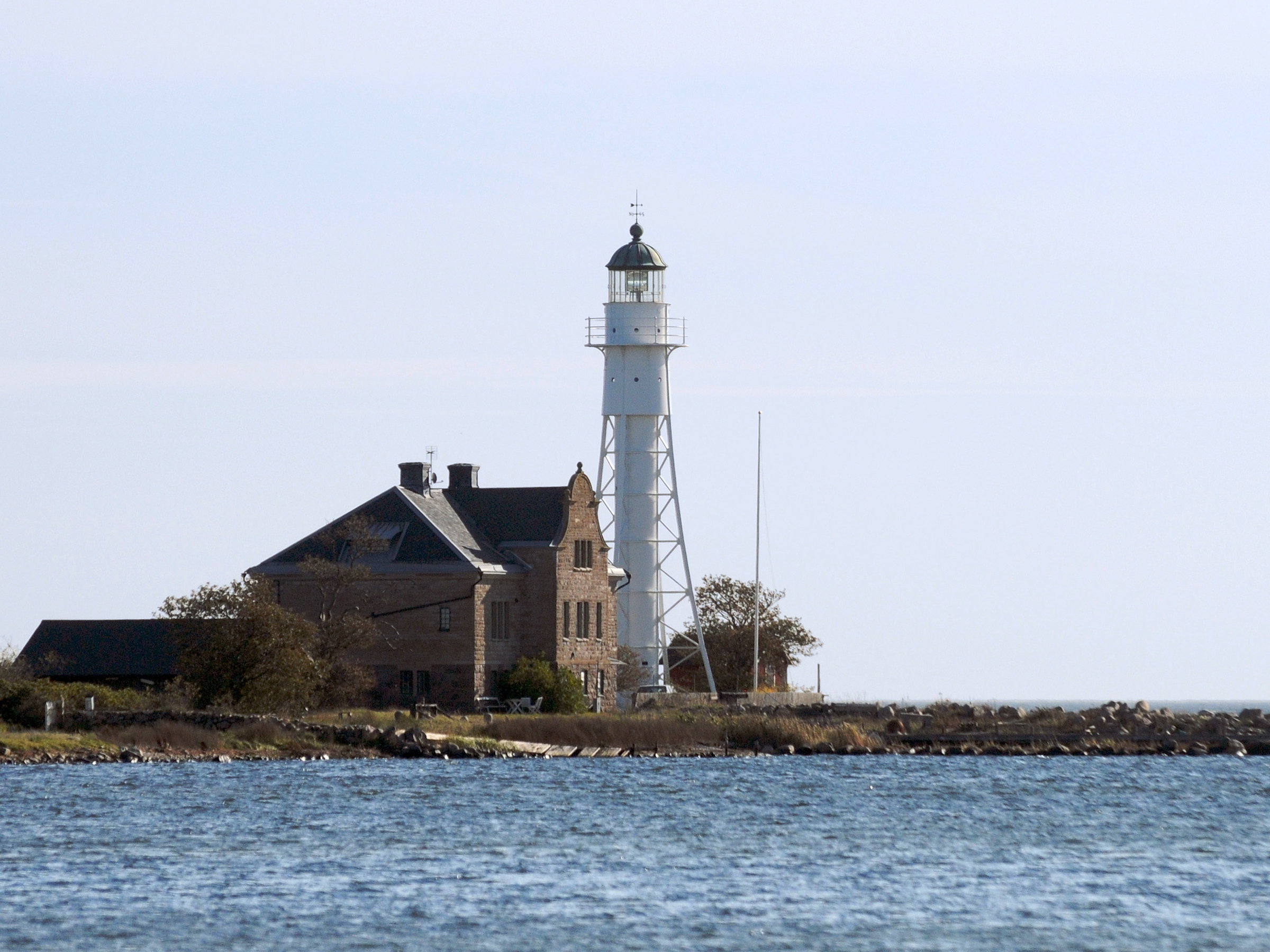
- Location: Öland, Löttorp, Borgholm Municipality, Sweden
- Coordinates: 57.146568°N 17.047189°E

Tower
- Constructed: 1898
- Construction: cast iron tower
- Automated: 1967
- Height: 23 metres (75 ft)
- Shape: square pyramidal skeletal tower with watch room, balcony and lantern
- Markings: white tower, grey metallic lantern dome
- Power source: kerosene, electricity
- Operator: Swedish Maritime Administration (Sjöfartsverket)
- Heritage: governmental listed building complex, governmental listed building

Light
- Focal height: 21 metres (69 ft)
- Lens: 3rd order Fresnel lens (original), 3rd order dioptric lens made by AGA (current)
- Range: 12.5 nautical miles (23.2 km; 14.4 mi)
- Characteristic: LFl (2) W 12s.
- Sweden no.: SV-5487

Högby Lighthouse is a Swedish lightstation. The lighthouse is built of iron and painted white. The design by architect Johan Höjer is unique to Sweden. The tower was exhibited at the Stockholm Exposition in 1897 before being located in Högby on a narrow peninsula. The flame ran on kerosene at first, and was updated with a gas mantle light in 1908. It was electrified in 1945 with a 1000 watt bulb and fully automated in 1967. Today the light runs with a faint 60 watt bulb, and the old rotating Fresnel lens has been replaced. The lighthouse is owned by The Swedish Maritime Administration.

Both the keeper's house and lighthouse is protected as a culturally important building since 1978. Today the keeper's house is a private residence to an artist and contains an art studio and showroom.

== Gallery ==
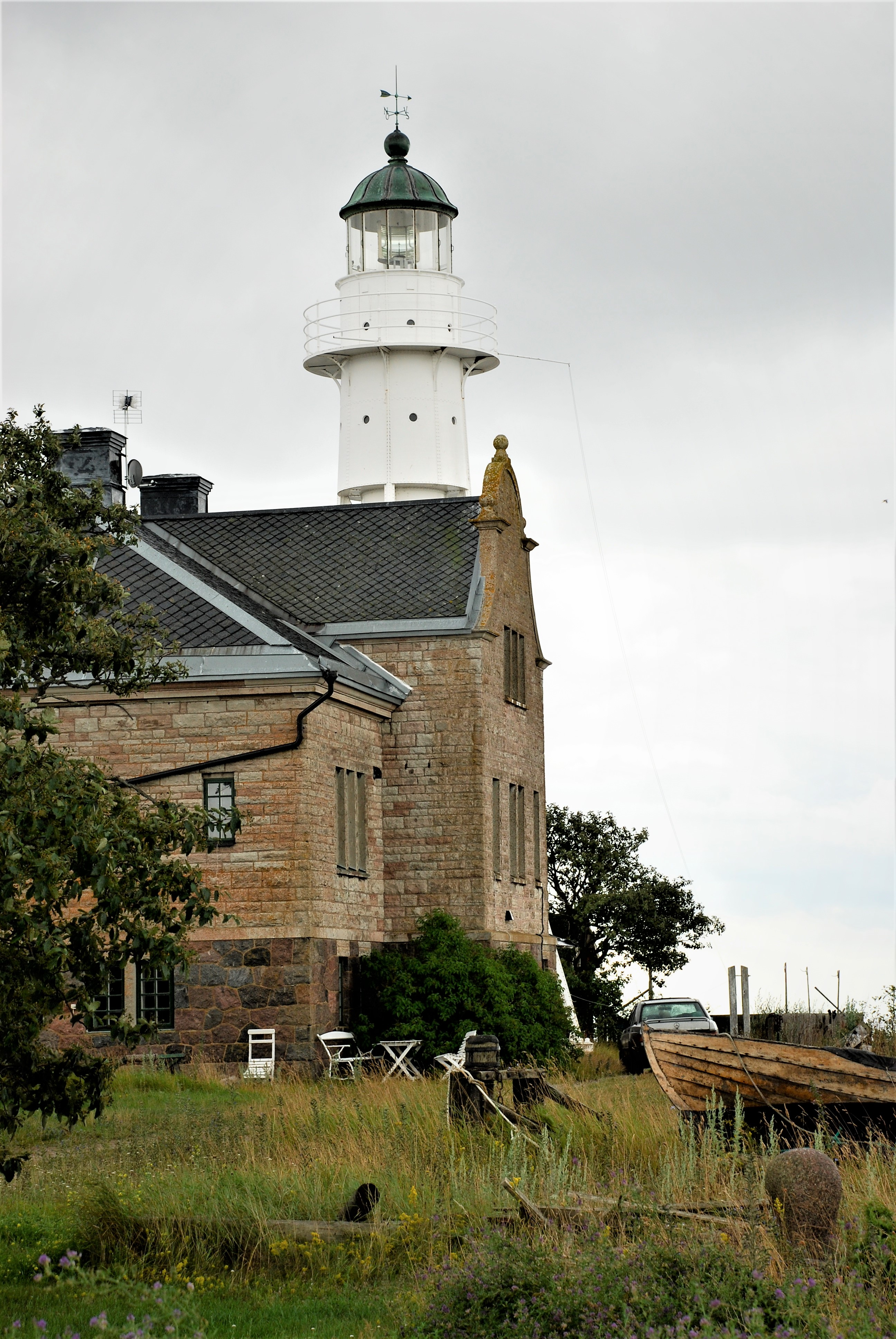
The keeper's house.

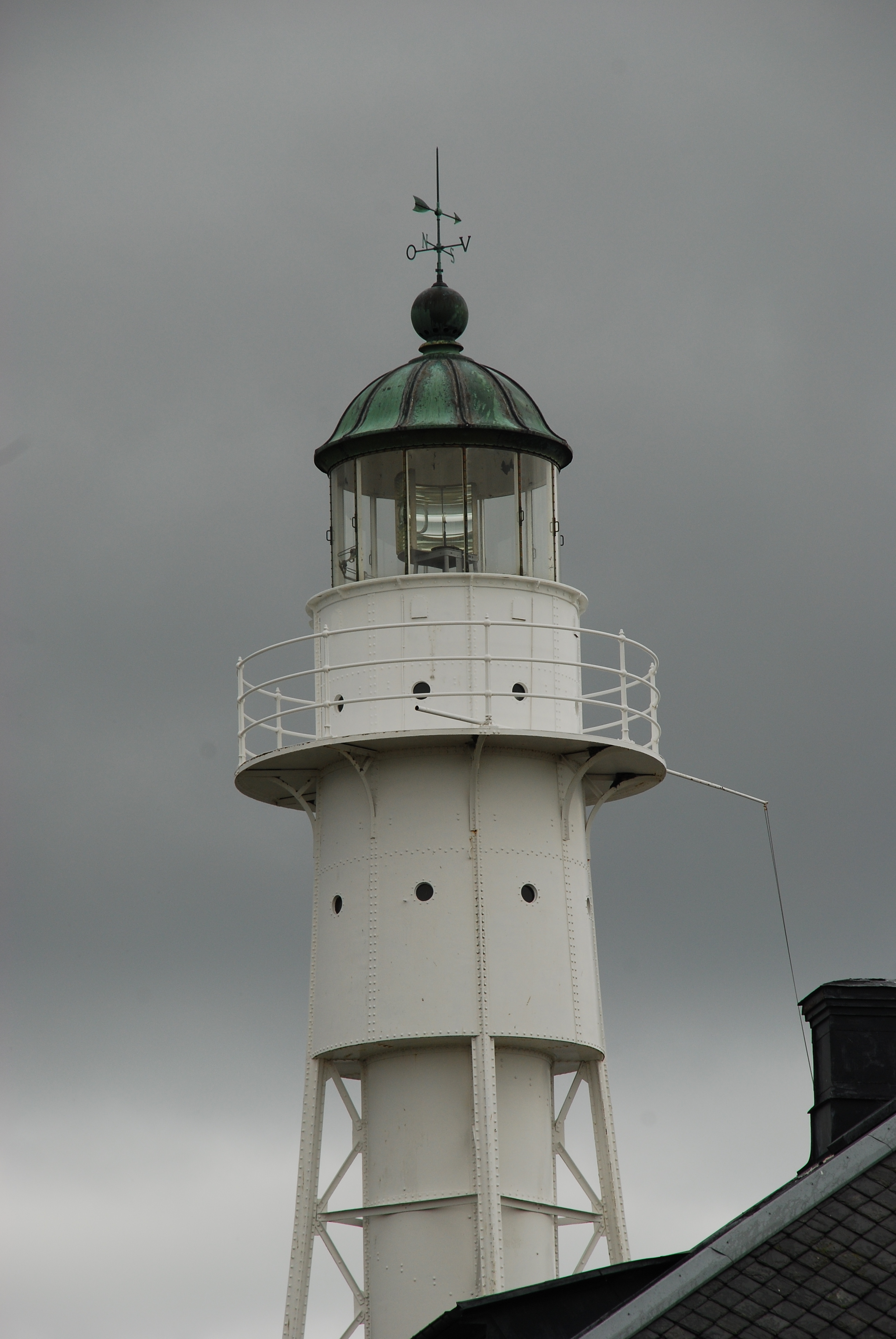
Close up.

== See also ==
- List of lighthouses and lightvessels in Sweden
