= Landsort =

Swedish village

Landsort lighthouse Landsort
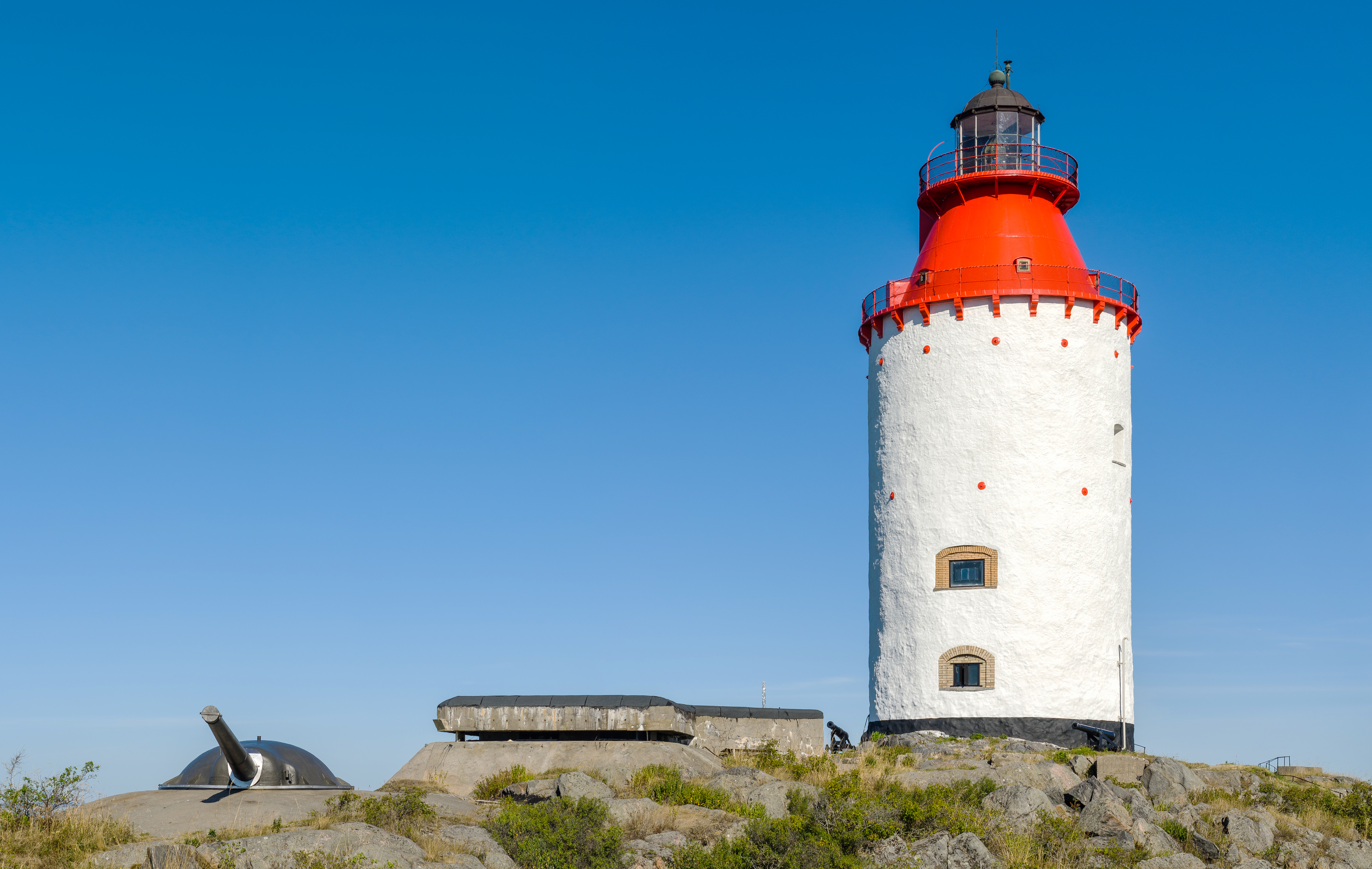
- Landsort Lighthouse
- Location: Öja; Södermanland; Sweden
- Coordinates: 58°44′23″N 17°51′57″E

Tower
- Constructed: 1651 (first)
- Foundation: stone
- Construction: stone and cast iron tower
- Automated: 1963
- Height: 25 metres (82 ft)
- Shape: two-stage tower: cylindrical lower part and conical roof with double balcony and lantern
- Markings: white tower, red roof
- Power source: charcoal, rapeseed oil, kerosene, electricity
- Operator: Swedish Maritime Administration (Sjöfartsverket)
- Heritage: governmental listed building complex, governmental listed building

Light
- First lit: 1689 (current)
- Focal height: 44.5 metres (146 ft)
- Lens: open fire (original), 3rd order Fresnel lens (current)
- Range: 22 nautical miles (41 km; 25 mi)
- Characteristic: Fl (5) W 60s.
- Sweden no.: SV-3275

Landsort (Swedish pronunciation: [ˈlânːdsʊʈ]) is a Swedish village with a lighthouse on the island of Öja. The village has around 30 permanent residents.

The tower was built in 1689, with an upper conical iron section added in 1870. Open fires, Serving as beacons, have been lit at the site since early times.

Landsort is the southernmost point of the Stockholm archipelago.

== Lighthouse ==
The first lighthouse in the modern sense was lit in 1651 and, until the current tower was raised, a couple of different buildings were used to support the light. The tower of 1689 was constructed to carry an open fire, which burned coal. In 1840, a colza oil lamp was installed. A flame consumed paraffin from 1887 but in 1938 the beacon was electrified. Today the Swedish Maritime Administration owns and runs the lighthouse.

During World War II and the Cold War, Landsort was a military base for the Swedish Coastal Artillery.

== Climate ==
The Swedish weather service SMHI operates a meteorological station at Landsort. The southern end of the island has either an oceanic climate (Cfb) or a humid continental climate (Dfb)(depending on if the 0 °C or -3 °C isotherm is used) with several maritime features. One of those is the delayed summer (May and June are very cool compared to nearby mainland areas), called seasonal lag. There is a very low diurnal temperature variation, which often results in very mild nights year-round compared with nearby cities and towns. Winters are more prone to cold than summers are to heat, owing to the possibility of coastal ice eliminating maritime moderation in winter months when inland temperatures are colder. During months in which ice is not a risk, all-time lows are much milder than during adjacent months. These cold snaps are rare. The area has a distinct microclimate, with relatively low precipitation for the reference period of 1961–1990. In spite of it being an extreme maritime climate by Swedish standards, it still is quite continental compared to similar latitudes in Scotland.

In summer, Landsort is isolated from heat waves affecting the east coast, with temperatures rarely going above 25 °C (77 °F). Between 2002 and 2016 there were only 14 such occurrences, at a 0.9 days average. The chilly temperatures are especially marked by May temperatures often staying 10 degrees lower or more than during coastal or inland warm periods. Summers are rather short, with June being relatively chilly and rapid cooling starting from September onwards. In spite of the cool summer days, Landsort has never reported September frost, a very unusual occurrence for Swedish weather stations. Overnight lows can be extremely mild. During a late summer 2002 heat wave, Landsort did not fall below 16.2 °C (61.2 °F) the entire August. On the other extreme, during a 2006 heat wave affecting the entire southern mainland, Landsort never rose above 24.3 °C (75.7 °F) in spite of frequent hot days in its vicinity.

The drastic cooling in winter months has resulted in an all-time cold record of −28 °C (−18 °F), typical of inland locations, but the all-time record heat measured at just 29 °C (84 °F) is comparatively low, especially since nearby Stockholm recorded 35.4 °C (95.7 °F) that very day in 1975.

Climate data for Landsort (2002–2020 averages; extremes since 1901)
Month	Jan	Feb	Mar	Apr	May	Jun	Jul	Aug	Sep	Oct	Nov	Dec	Year
Record high °C (°F)	9.4 (48.9)	9.4 (48.9)	12.5 (54.5)	16.5 (61.7)	23.2 (73.8)	27.5 (81.5)	28.0 (82.4)	29.0 (84.2)	23.0 (73.4)	16.9 (62.4)	14.2 (57.6)	10.7 (51.3)	29.0 (84.2)
Mean maximum °C (°F)	5.8 (42.4)	5.2 (41.4)	8.0 (46.4)	11.9 (53.4)	17.2 (63.0)	21.8 (71.2)	24.0 (75.2)	23.5 (74.3)	19.0 (66.2)	13.9 (57.0)	10.1 (50.2)	7.2 (45.0)	24.8 (76.6)
Mean daily maximum °C (°F)	1.6 (34.9)	1.4 (34.5)	3.3 (37.9)	6.9 (44.4)	11.4 (52.5)	16.5 (61.7)	20.0 (68.0)	19.7 (67.5)	15.6 (60.1)	10.2 (50.4)	6.5 (43.7)	3.7 (38.7)	9.7 (49.5)
Daily mean °C (°F)	−0.1 (31.8)	−0.2 (31.6)	1.5 (34.7)	4.8 (40.6)	9.2 (48.6)	14.2 (57.6)	17.8 (64.0)	17.7 (63.9)	13.7 (56.7)	8.6 (47.5)	5.0 (41.0)	2.2 (36.0)	7.9 (46.2)
Mean daily minimum °C (°F)	−1.6 (29.1)	−1.8 (28.8)	−0.4 (31.3)	2.3 (36.1)	7.1 (44.8)	12.0 (53.6)	15.6 (60.1)	15.6 (60.1)	11.8 (53.2)	7.0 (44.6)	3.5 (38.3)	0.5 (32.9)	6.0 (42.7)
Mean minimum °C (°F)	−8.6 (16.5)	−8.6 (16.5)	−5.4 (22.3)	−1.2 (29.8)	2.8 (37.0)	8.1 (46.6)	11.9 (53.4)	11.6 (52.9)	6.9 (44.4)	1.6 (34.9)	−2.6 (27.3)	−5.6 (21.9)	−10.7 (12.7)
Record low °C (°F)	−26.4 (−15.5)	−28.0 (−18.4)	−26.0 (−14.8)	−18.5 (−1.3)	−4.0 (24.8)	2.5 (36.5)	7.3 (45.1)	6.8 (44.2)	1.2 (34.2)	−4.0 (24.8)	−9.0 (15.8)	−17.8 (0.0)	−28.0 (−18.4)
Average precipitation mm (inches)	33.6 (1.32)	29.1 (1.15)	23.6 (0.93)	22.4 (0.88)	34.0 (1.34)	44.4 (1.75)	44.8 (1.76)	60.9 (2.40)	38.0 (1.50)	51.3 (2.02)	51.6 (2.03)	49.1 (1.93)	482.8 (19.01)
Source 1: SMHI Open Data
Source 2: SMHI Monthly Data 2002–2020

== See also ==
- List of lighthouses and lightvessels in Sweden
- Stockholm Archipelago Trail
