= Grönskär =

Lighthouse in Sweden

Grönskär lighthouse Grönskär
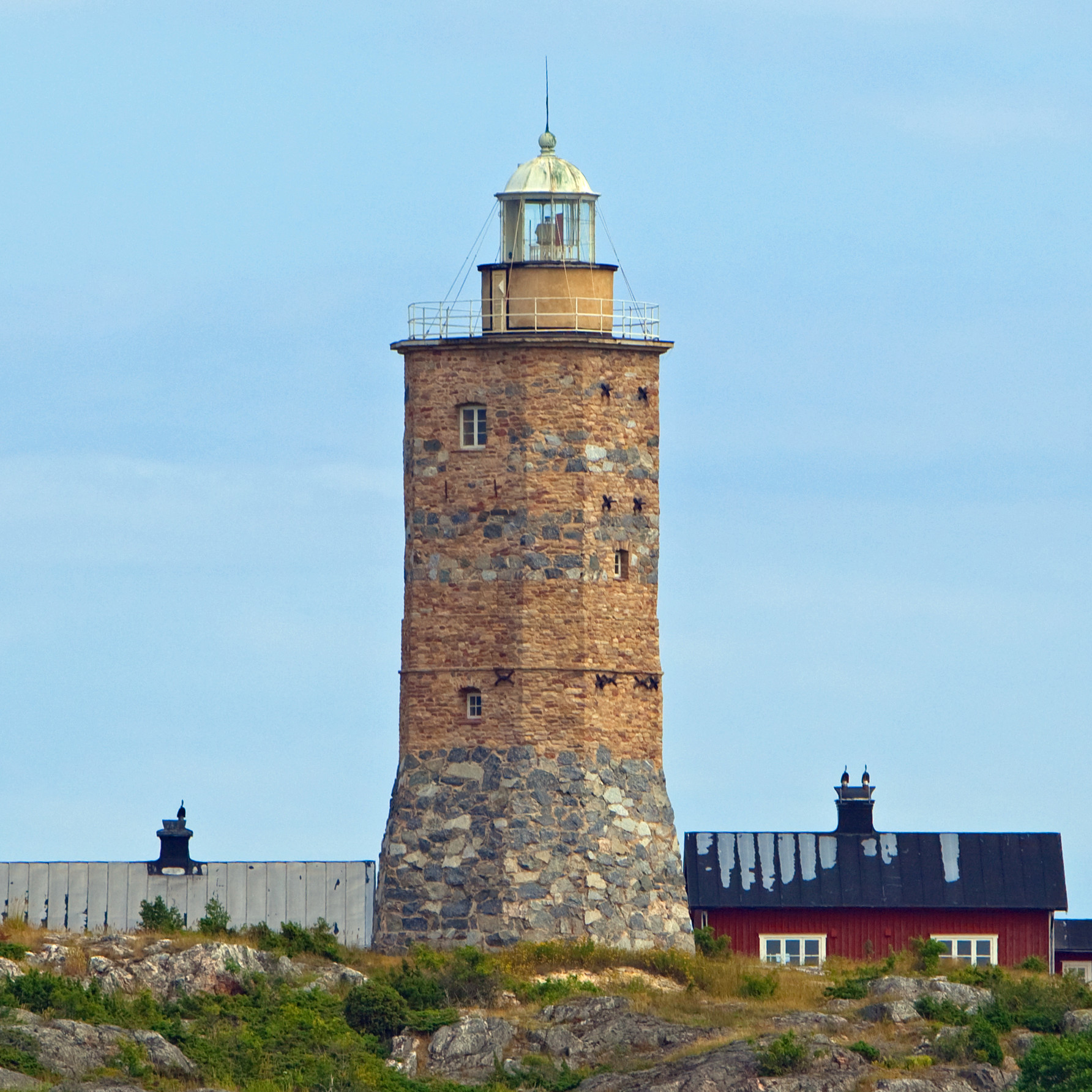
- Location: Grönskär; Stockholm archipelago Sweden
- Coordinates: 59.277953°N 19.024364°E

Tower
- Constructed: 1770
- Construction: granite base and limestone tower
- Automated: never
- Height: 18 metres (59 ft)
- Shape: octagonal tower with balcony and off center lantern
- Markings: brownish and grey unpainted tower, greenish lantern dome
- Power source: bituminous coal, rapeseed oil, kerosene, solar cell
- Heritage: individual listed building complex, enskilt byggnadsminne

Light
- First lit: 1 September 1770
- Deactivated: 1961-2000
- Focal height: 33 metres (108 ft)
- Lens: open coal fire, 3rd order Fresnel lens (1845-1961), diode light (current)
- Range: 4 nautical miles (7.4 km; 4.6 mi)
- Characteristic: L Fl G 20s.

Grönskär (English: The Green skerry) is a Swedish island and lighthouse station located in the south Stockholm archipelago, east of Sandhamn. The island is rocky and the nature sparse. The herb cloudberry has been found on the island. The whole island is owned by the Swedish foundation "Skärgårdsstiftelsen" (English: The Archipelago foundation). since 1964. The foundation also owns the lighthouse since 1984.

== History ==
The Grönskär lighthouse construction started in 1769. Sketchings were made by the architect Carl Adelcrantz. The tower replaced a day beacon that was built 1725, and destroyed in a storm in 1768. The light was an open coal fire. The tower was enhanced in 1786 and has remained in that shape since. In 1845, a colza oil lamp and Fresnel lens was installed. In 1873 the light was updated with a kerosene lamp. This light station was never automated or electrified and was closed down in favor of the modern lighthouse Revengegrundet 1961. That light is placed in open water and can be seen from Grönskär. The original lens was taken away in 1963. In September 2000 the lighthouse was reactivated with modern equipment powered with sun panels. It shows a green faint color, since the word "grön" means green in Swedish. It was chosen as it was a good fit to the island's name.

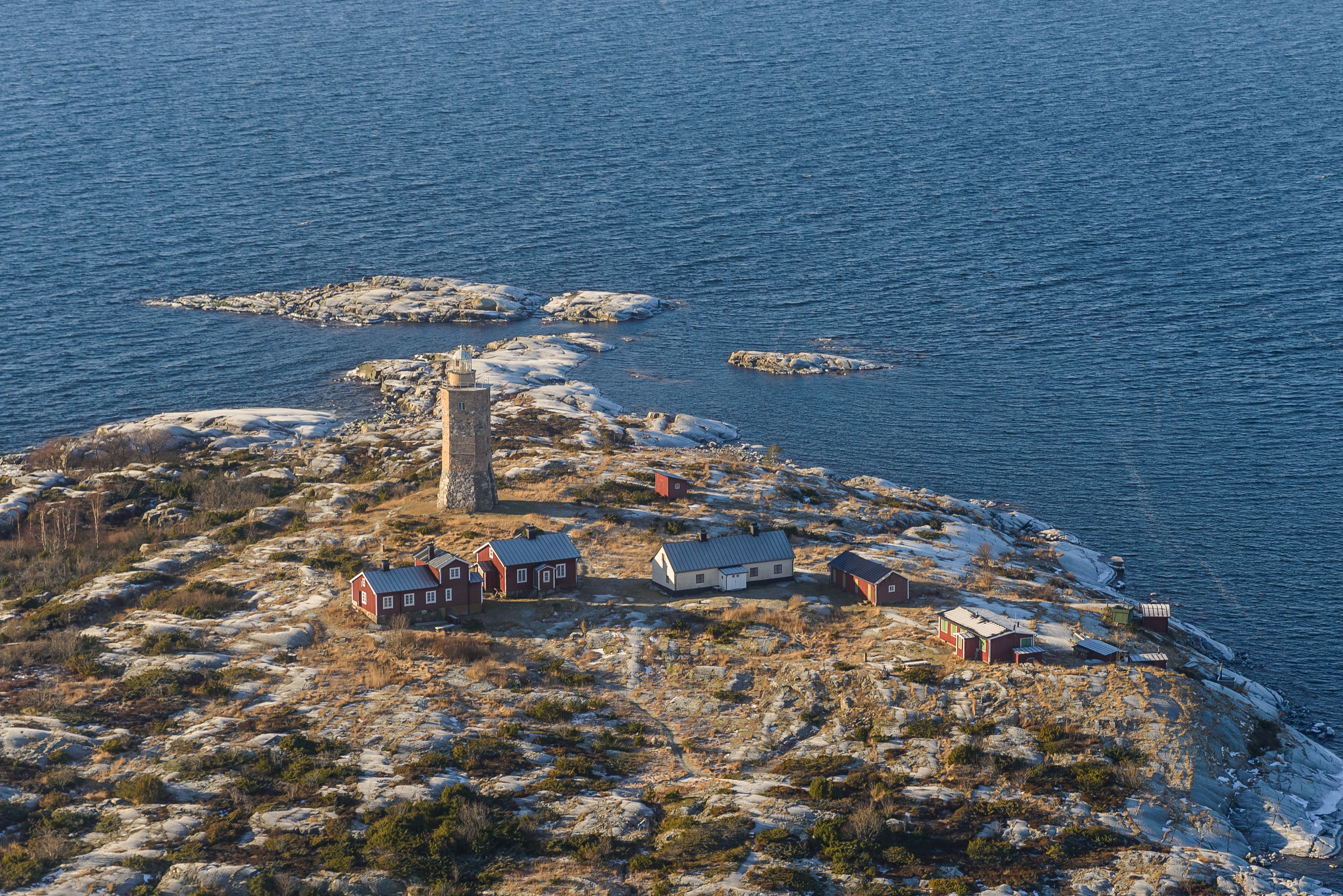
The island and lighthouse

== See also ==
- List of lighthouses and lightvessels in Sweden
