= Utklippan =

Utklippan Lighthouse
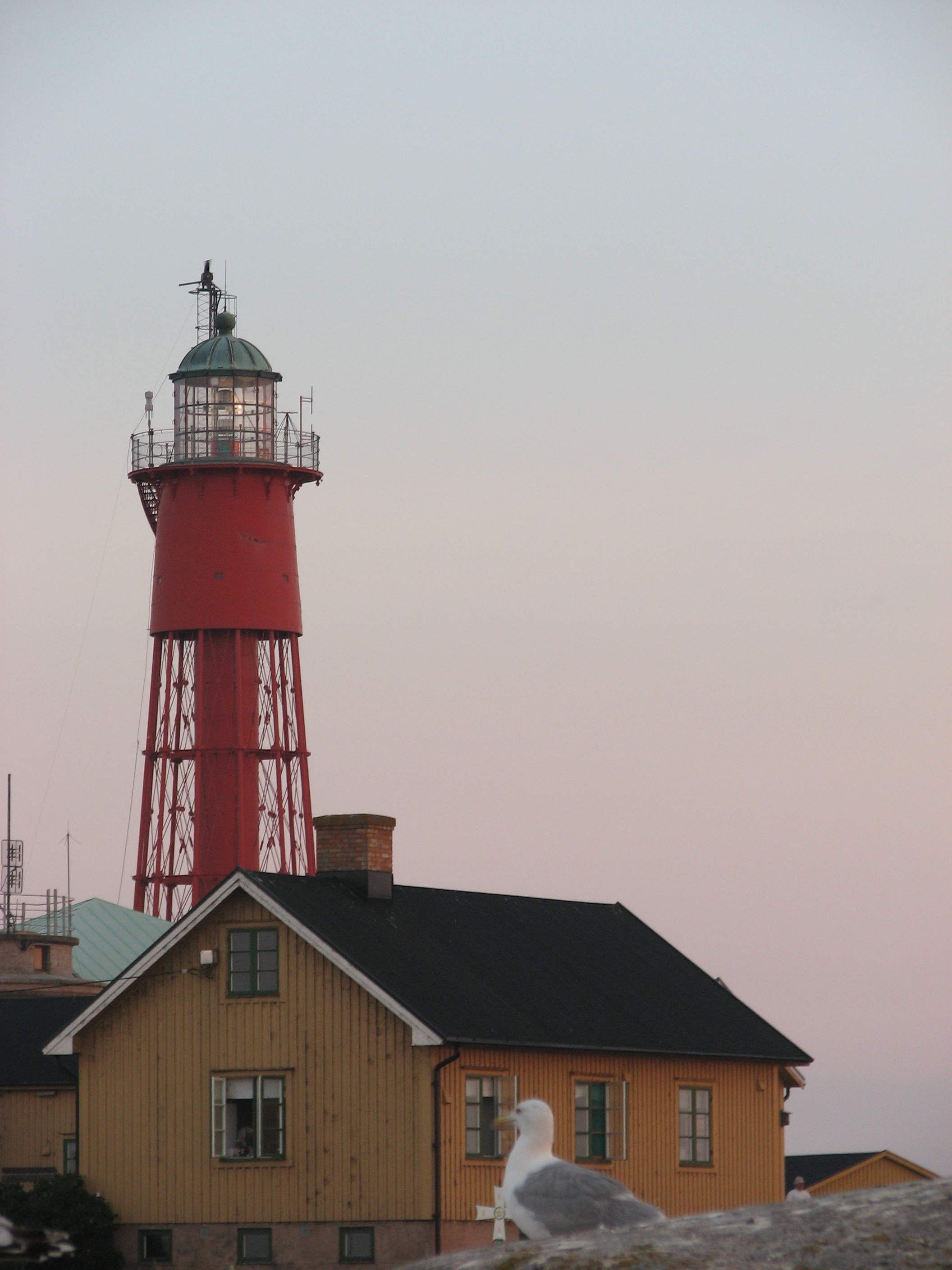
- Utklippan Lighthouse
- Location: Baltic Sea; Southeast of Karlskrona; Sweden
- Coordinates: 55.952736°N 15.701429°E

Tower
- Constructed: 1789 (first); 1840 (second)
- Foundation: stone basement
- Construction: cast iron skeletal tower
- Automated: 1972
- Height: 30 metres (98 ft)
- Shape: conical skeletal tower with central cylinder, balcony and lantern on a stone fortress
- Markings: red tower, grey lantern dome, white fortress
- Power source: rapeseed oil, kerosene, electricity
- Operator: Swedish Maritime Administration (Sjöfartsverket)
- Heritage: governmental listed building

Light
- First lit: 1870 (current)
- Deactivated: 2008 (passing light active)
- Focal height: 31 metres (102 ft)
- Lens: mirrors (original), 4th Fresnel lens (current)
- Range: 23 nautical miles (43 km; 26 mi)
- Characteristic: Fl (2) WRG 6s. (current); Fl W 15s. (before deactivation)
- Sweden no.: SV-6015

Utklippan is a Swedish island group including Södraskär (South Skerry), Norraskär (North Skerry), and Degerhuvudet. It has been home to a lighthouse since 1789.

== History ==
Utklippan has been a light station since 1789 when a basket light was in use. The current tower (built in 1870) replaced an older tower built in 1840 on top of an old fortress. The flame ran on colza oil. In 1887 the colza oil lamp was replaced with a kerosene lamp. It has been powered electrically since 1948.

Utklippan was turned into a nature reserve in 1988. The Swedish Maritime Administration owns the lighthouse today. In the summer of 2008 SMA reported that the white main light had been deactivated, as it was no longer considered to be an important lighthouse for commercial shipping. A small passing light remains in use.

== Geography ==
Utklippan consists of three main islands – Södraskär, Norraskär, and Degerhuvudet – in addition to some smaller skerries.

Between Södraskär and Norraskär is a fishing harbour. Today it is protected and mainly used for recreational boats. There are five other houses on the islands, owned by the Swedish National Property Board. One of them is a small hostel.

Despite its remote location, Utklippan is home to varied wildlife including frogs, earless seals, blue mussels, and seaweed. A birding station exists to watch and research migrating birds in the spring and autumn.

The bedrock on Utklippan consists of granite. There are traces of the ice sheet that used to cover the Baltic Sea.

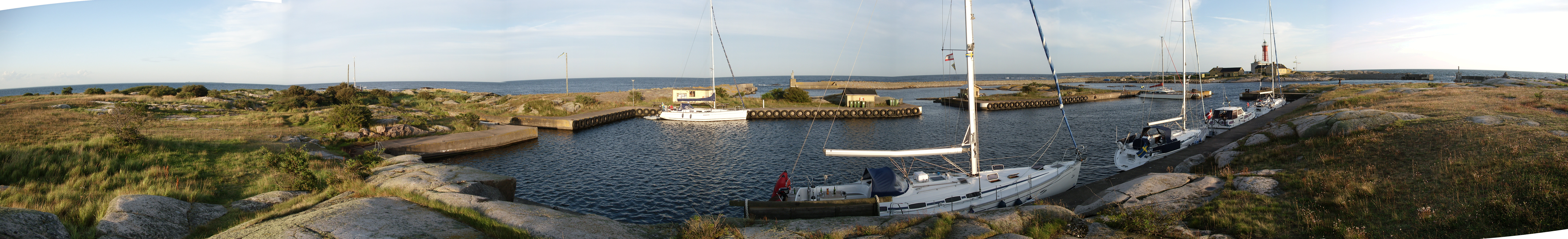
Panoramic view of Utklippan twin islands; view from the small harbour bassin of the north island towards the southeast, 30.07.2009

Climate data for Utklippan, 2015-2021
Month	Jan	Feb	Mar	Apr	May	Jun	Jul	Aug	Sep	Oct	Nov	Dec	Year
Mean daily maximum °C (°F)	4.1 (39.4)	4.0 (39.2)	5.2 (41.4)	8.1 (46.6)	12.7 (54.9)	17.8 (64.0)	19.9 (67.8)	20.6 (69.1)	17.0 (62.6)	12.6 (54.7)	9.0 (48.2)	6.4 (43.5)	11.4 (52.6)
Daily mean °C (°F)	2.7 (36.9)	2.6 (36.7)	3.5 (38.3)	5.9 (42.6)	10.2 (50.4)	15.2 (59.4)	17.5 (63.5)	18.3 (64.9)	15.2 (59.4)	11.1 (52.0)	7.6 (45.7)	5.0 (41.0)	9.6 (49.2)
Mean daily minimum °C (°F)	1.4 (34.5)	1.2 (34.2)	1.8 (35.2)	3.7 (38.7)	7.7 (45.9)	12.7 (54.9)	15.3 (59.5)	16.1 (61.0)	13.4 (56.1)	9.1 (48.4)	6.4 (43.5)	3.5 (38.3)	7.7 (45.9)

== See also ==
- List of lighthouses and lightvessels in Sweden
