= Hallands Väderö =

Hallands Väderö Lighthouse
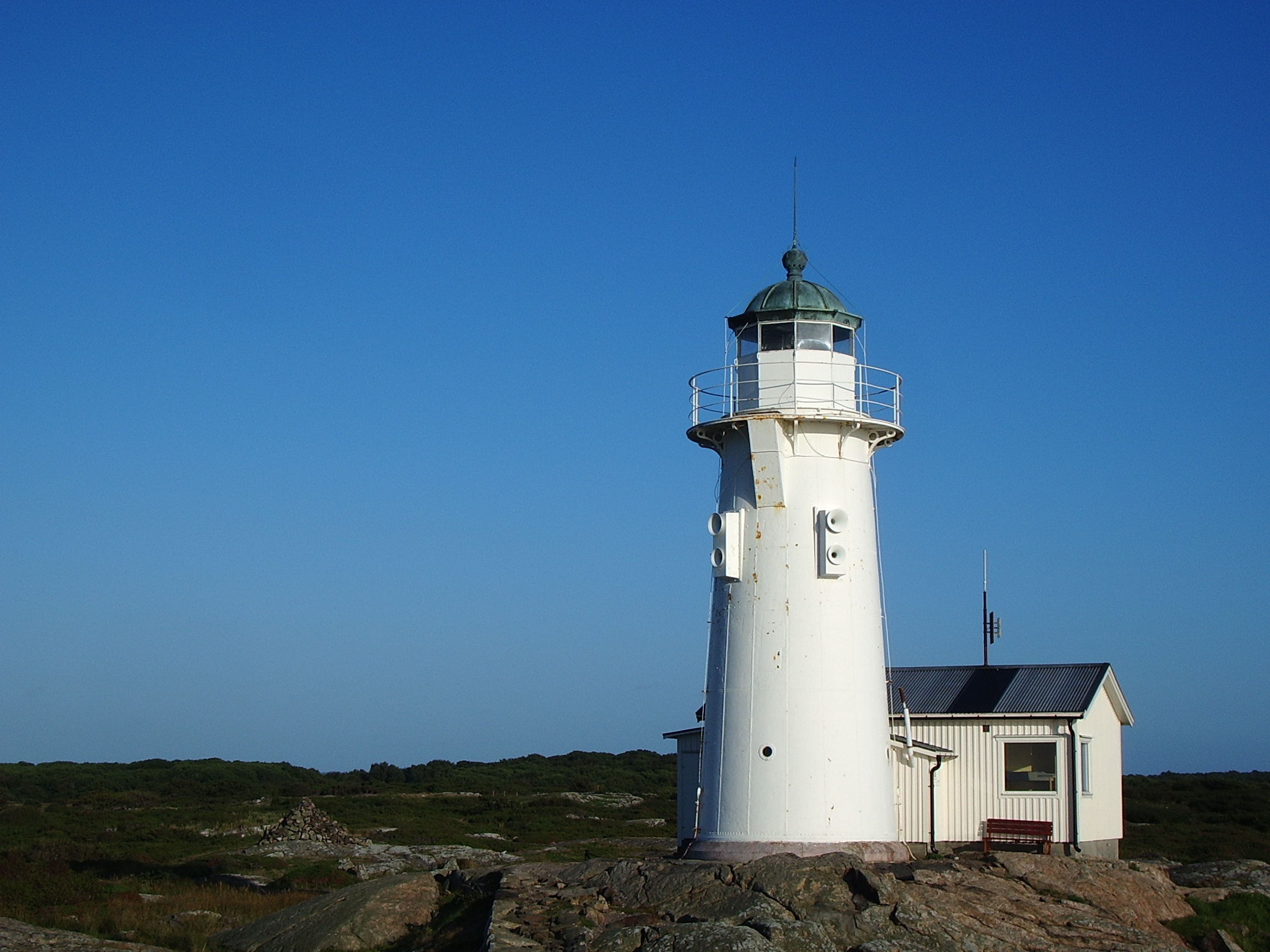
- Hallands Väderö Lighthouse
- Location: Hallands Väderö, west of Torekov, Kattegatt sea, Sweden
- Coordinates: 56.450708°N 12.542501°E

Tower
- Constructed: 1884 (first)
- Construction: cast iron tower
- Automated: 1965
- Height: 13 metres (43 ft)
- Shape: cylindrical tower with balcony and lantern
- Markings: white tower, greenish lantern dome
- Operator: Swedish Maritime Administration (Sjöfartsverket)
- Heritage: individual listed building complex

Light
- First lit: 1909 (current)
- Focal height: 21 metres (69 ft)
- Lens: 3rd order Fresnel lens (original), 4th order lens (current)
- Range: 12 nautical miles (22 km; 14 mi)
- Characteristic: Iso W 8s.
- Sweden no.: SV-7173

Hallands Väderö (en: Halland's Weather Island) is a Swedish island located in the northwest corner of the Scania province, but it is named after the province above; Halland. Since 1958 it has been a nature reserve due to its valuable ecologic life with an old beech-forest, unusual fungi and large bird populations. During the summer season small ferries transport people to the island from Torekov. There are no permanent residents on the island at the present time, but many cabins from older times remain on the island and some can be rented for overnight accommodations. The island is also known for its large beaches that are good for bathing. In 2006 the Swedish state surveying Lantmäteriverket decided that the whole island belonged to the Church of Sweden due to an old agreement from 1753.

== Lighthouse ==
The lighthouse on the island was constructed on the northwestern tip in 1884 and originally carried a kerosene lamp. It was electrified in 1950 and totally automated in 1965. In the summer of 2010 the power cable to main land was cut and the power source replaced with solar panels and batteries. The light was changed to a LED-light and the characteristic modified to preserve power. The tower is connected to a small light keepers cabin. It is owned and remote controlled by the Swedish Maritime Administration.

Map of Halland Väderö and Torekov.

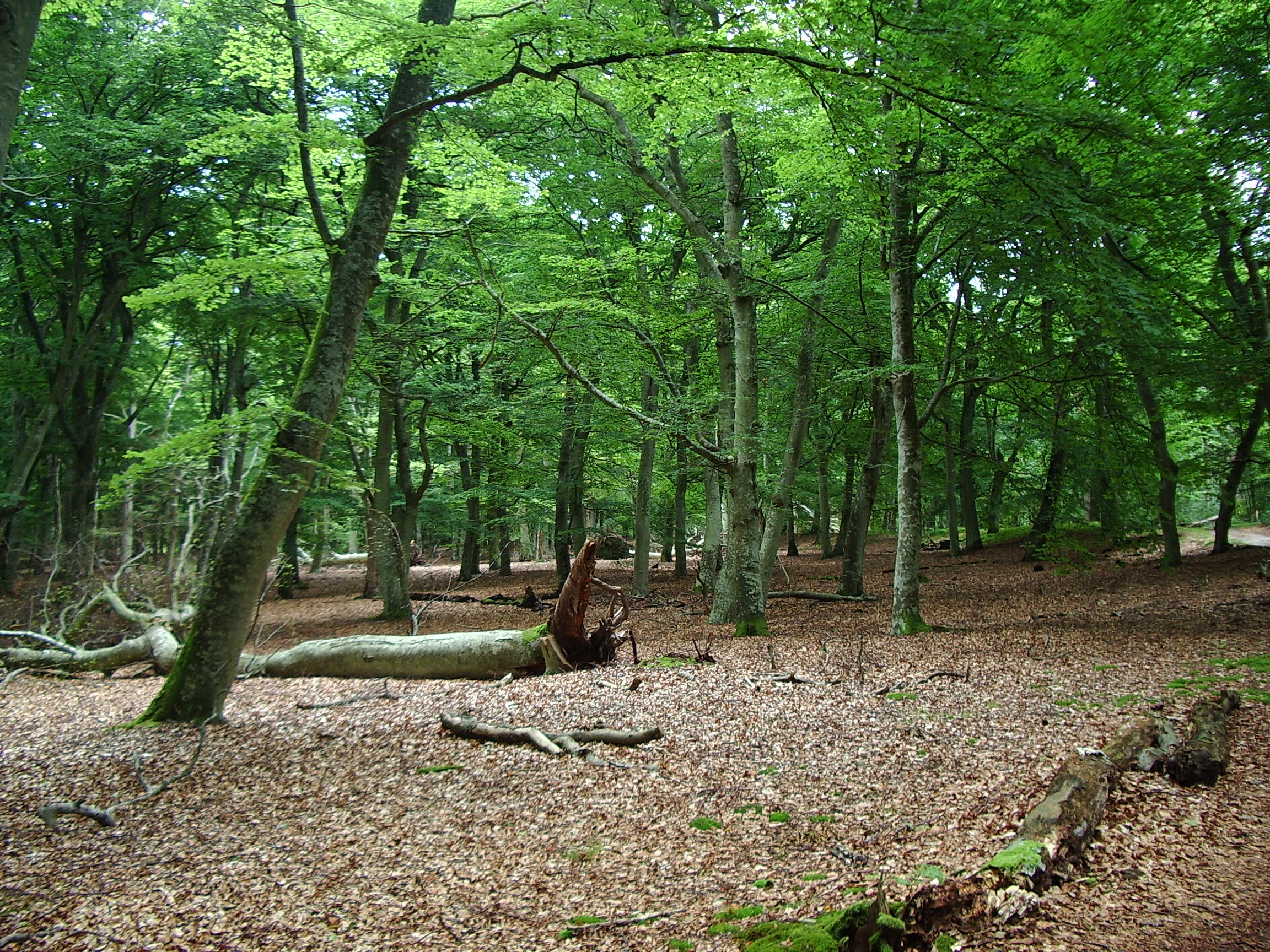
Beech forest.

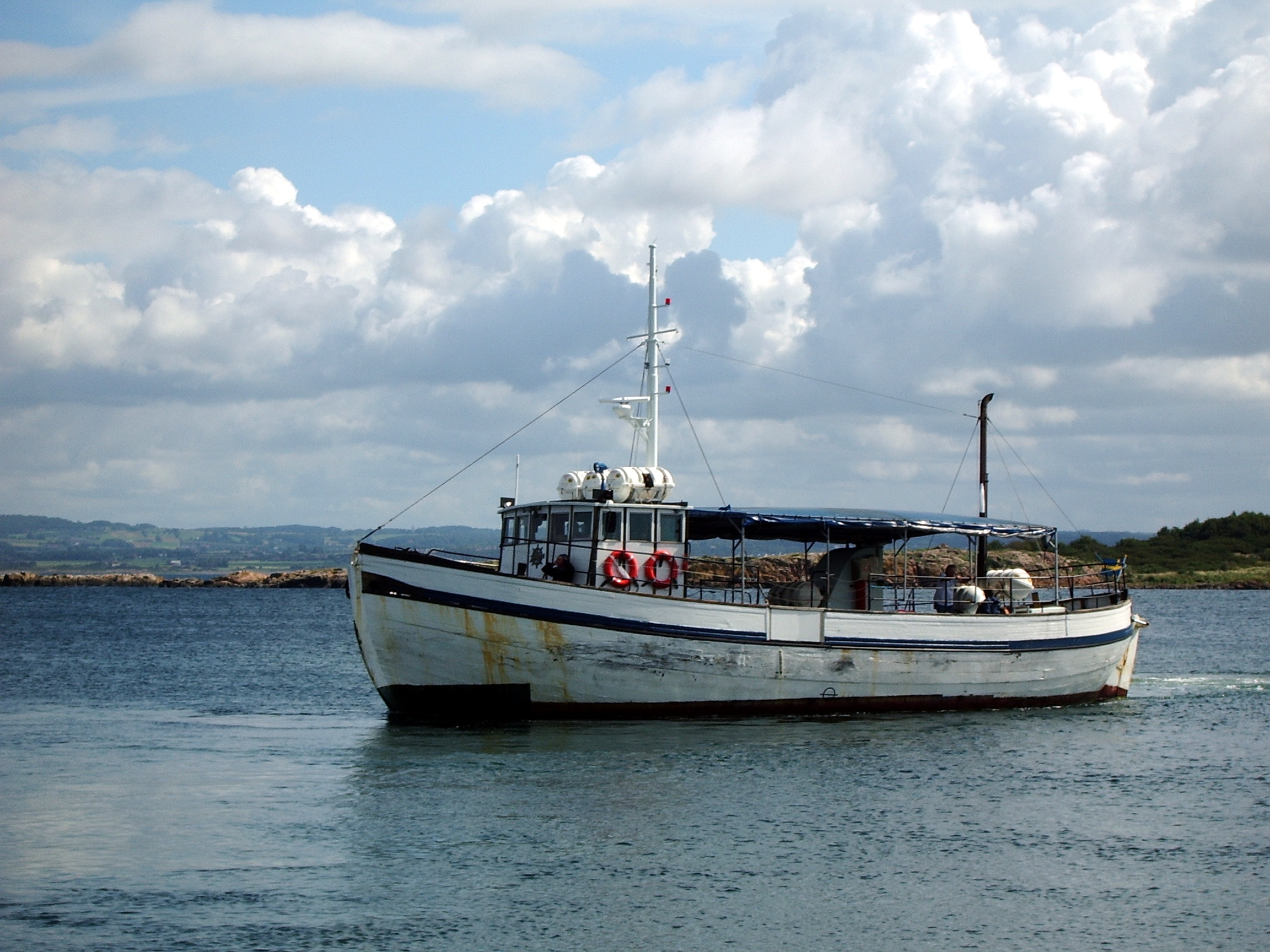
The tour boat on the way back to Torekov.

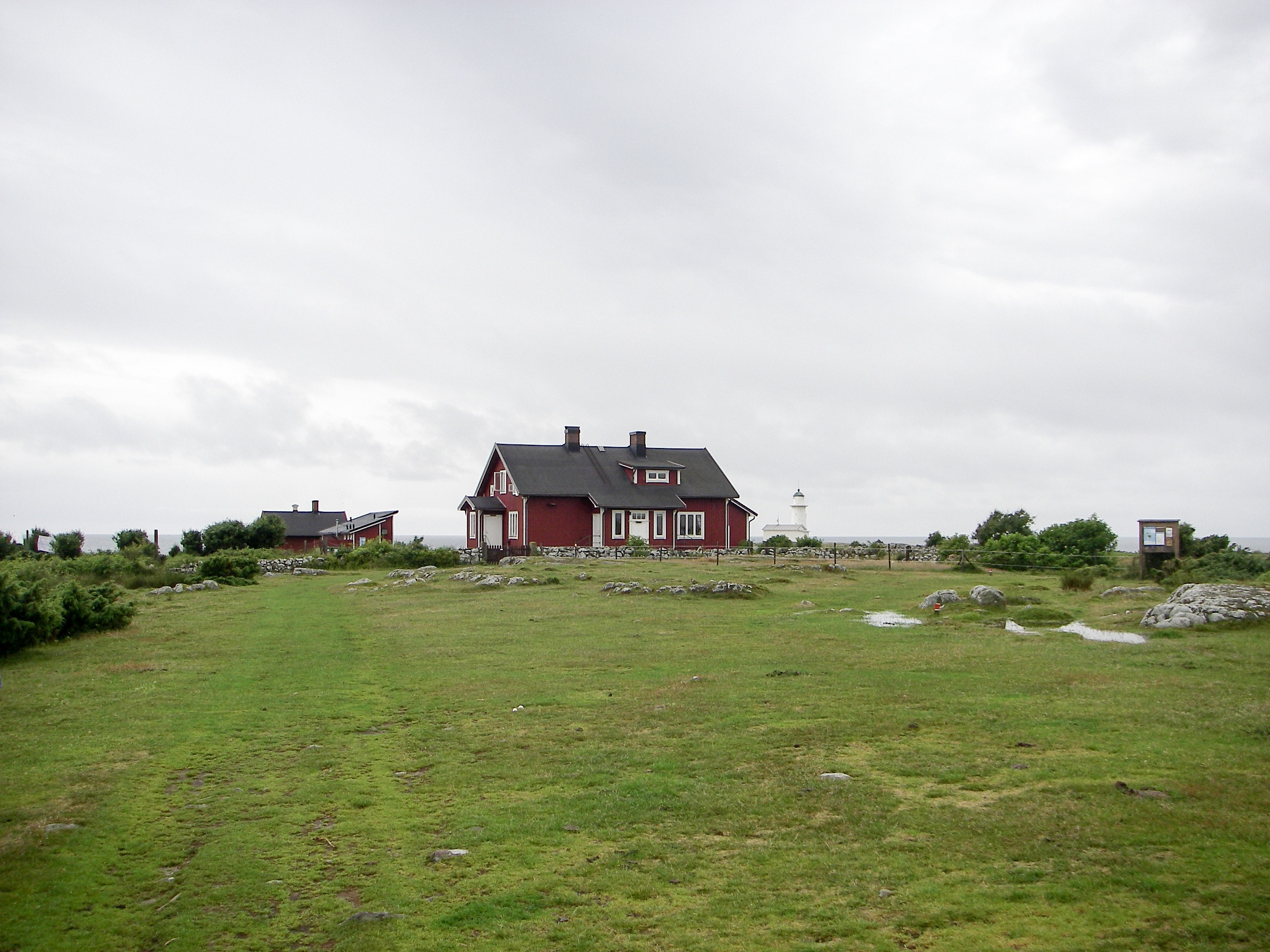
Lighthouse keepers house.

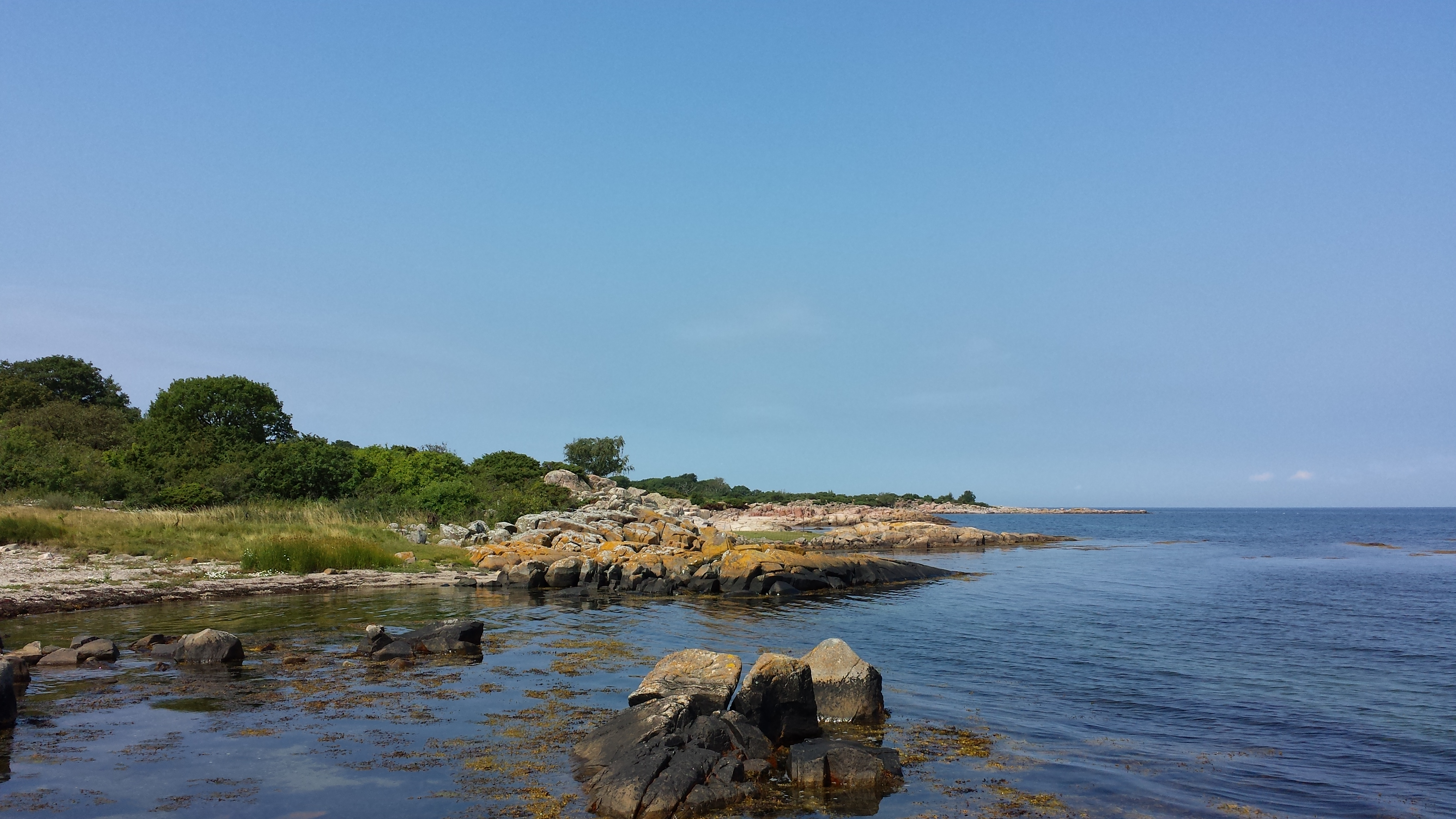
Beach on the east coast.

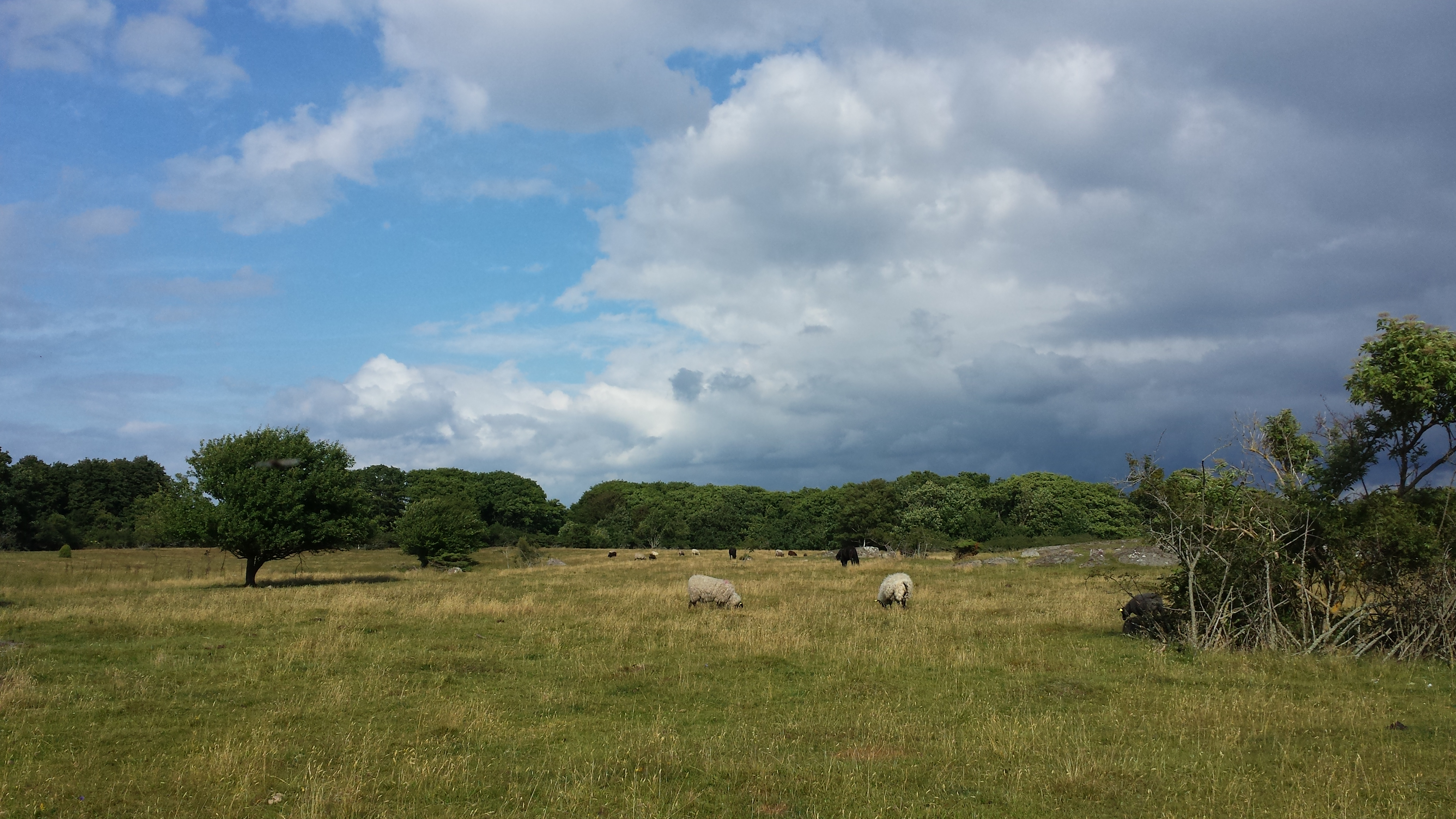
Grazing sheep.

== See also ==
- List of lighthouses and lightvessels in Sweden
