= Fårö Lighthouse =

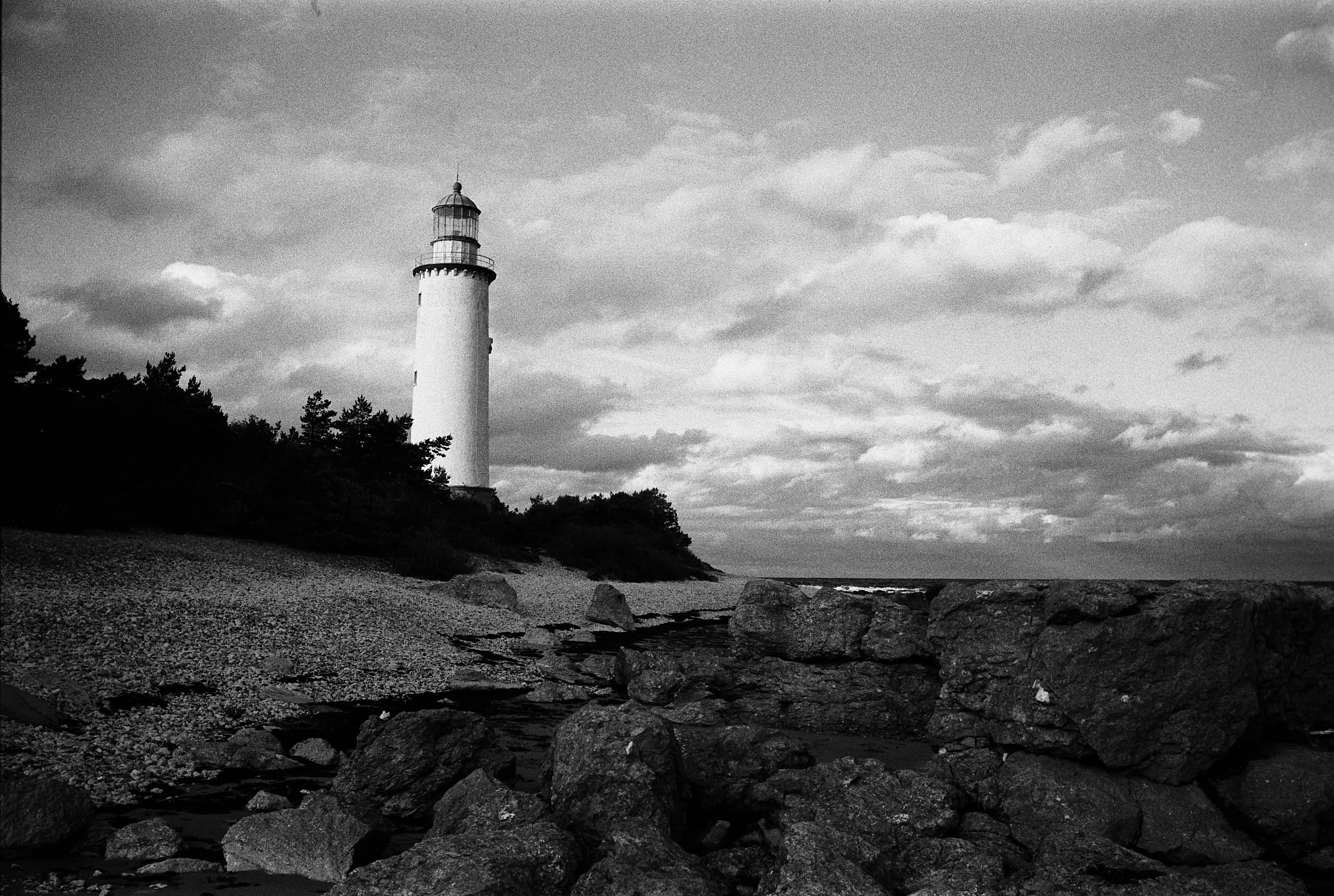
- Fårö Lighthouse
- Location: Fårö; Gotland; Sweden
- Coordinates: 57.959570°N 19.349265°E

Tower
- Constructed: 1847
- Foundation: limestone basement
- Construction: stone tower
- Automated: 1976
- Height: 30 metres (98 ft)
- Shape: cylindrical tower with balcony and lantern
- Markings: white tower and lantern, greenish lantern roof
- Power source: rapeseed oil, kerosene, electricity
- Operator: Swedish Maritime Administration (Sjöfartsverket)
- Heritage: governmental listed building complex, governmental listed building

Light
- First lit: 21 October 1847
- Focal height: 31 metres (102 ft)
- Lens: mirrors (original), 4th order Fresnel lens (current)
- Range: 17 nautical miles (31 km; 20 mi)
- Characteristic: Iso WR 8s.
- Sweden no.: SV-4117

Fårö Lighthouse (Swedish: Fårö fyr) is a Swedish lighthouse located on the easternmost tip of Fårö, a Baltic Sea island.

== History ==
In the 19th century there had been many complaints from sea authorities that the coastlines on Gotland had very few lighthouses. So the decision was made to build one on the north side of Gotland. This lighthouse was constructed one year after the one on Hoburgen at the south tip of Gotland.

The light ran on a colza oil lamp at first. In 1882 a paraffin lamp replaced the old one, and in 1953 it was electrified. From 1891 to 1976 the tower had a first-order Fresnel lens installed in its lantern which made the lighthouse very powerful. It is remote-controlled since 1976 and owned by the Swedish Maritime Administration.

== See also ==
- List of lighthouses and lightvessels in Sweden
