= Understen =

Understen lighthouse Understen
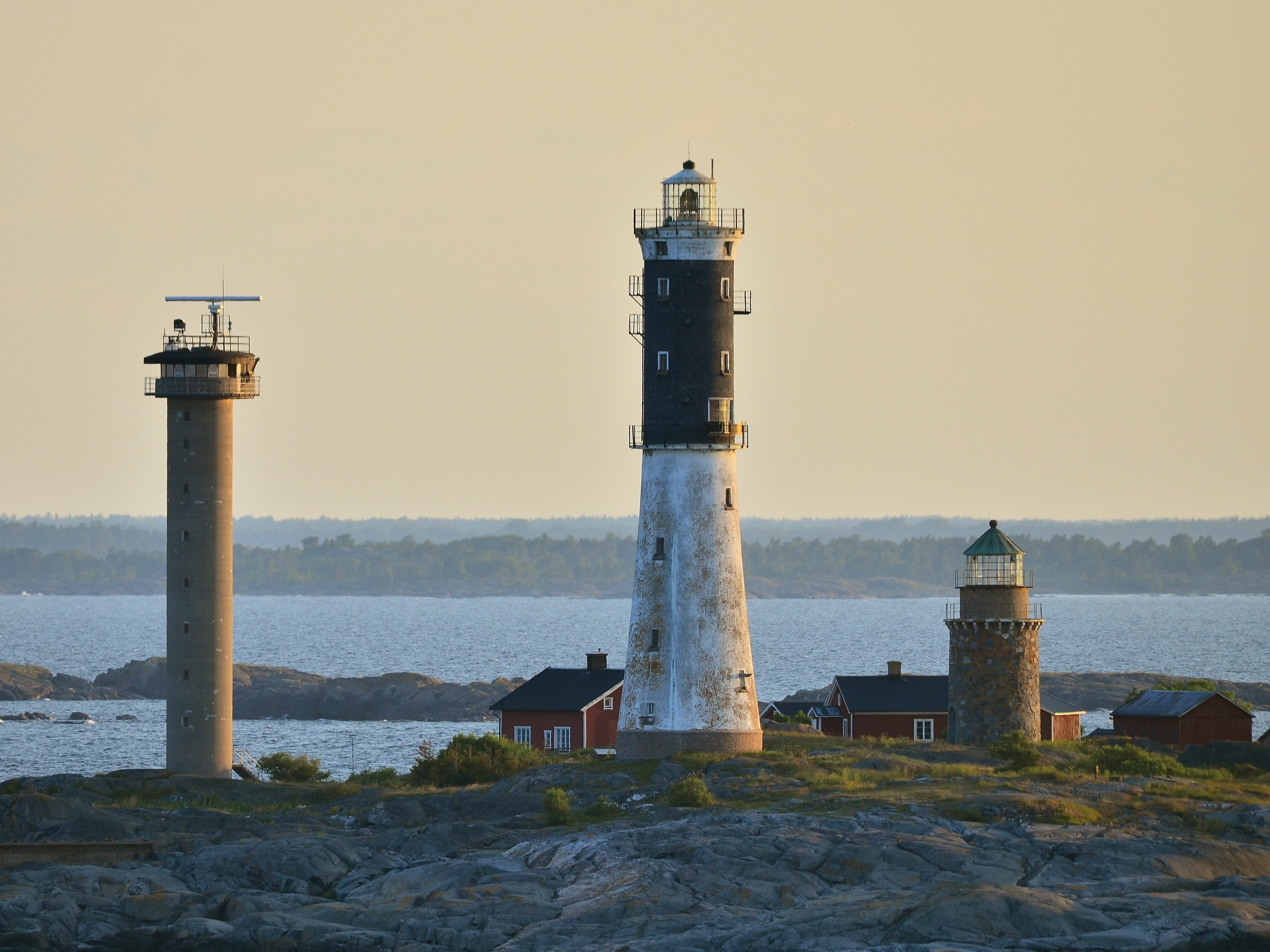
- The current lighthouse is the black and white tower in the centre
- Location: Understen, Norrtälje Municipality, Sweden
- Coordinates: 60°16′30″N 18°55′12″E

Tower
- Constructed: 1915
- Construction: reinforced concrete
- Automated: 1966
- Height: 39 m (128 ft)
- Shape: tapered 2-stage cylindrical tower with balcony and lantern
- Markings: Black (stripe), white, white (lantern)
- Power source: kerosene, diesel generator, electricity
- Operator: Swedish Maritime Administration

Light
- Focal height: 48 m (157 ft), 32 m (105 ft)
- Lens: third order Fresnel lens
- Range: 23 nmi (43 km; 26 mi) (main light), 15 nmi (28 km; 17 mi) (auxiliary light)
- Characteristic: Fl(4) W 15s, F WRG (1922–)
- Sweden no.: SV-2201

Main light
- First lit: 1916
- Focal height: 48 m (157 ft)
- Lens: third order Fresnel lens
- Range: 23 nmi (43 km; 26 mi)
- Characteristic: Fl(4) W 15s

Auxiliary light
- First lit: 1916
- Focal height: 32 m (105 ft)
- Range: 15 nmi (28 km; 17 mi) (auxiliary light)
- Characteristic: F WRG
- Understen old lighthouse
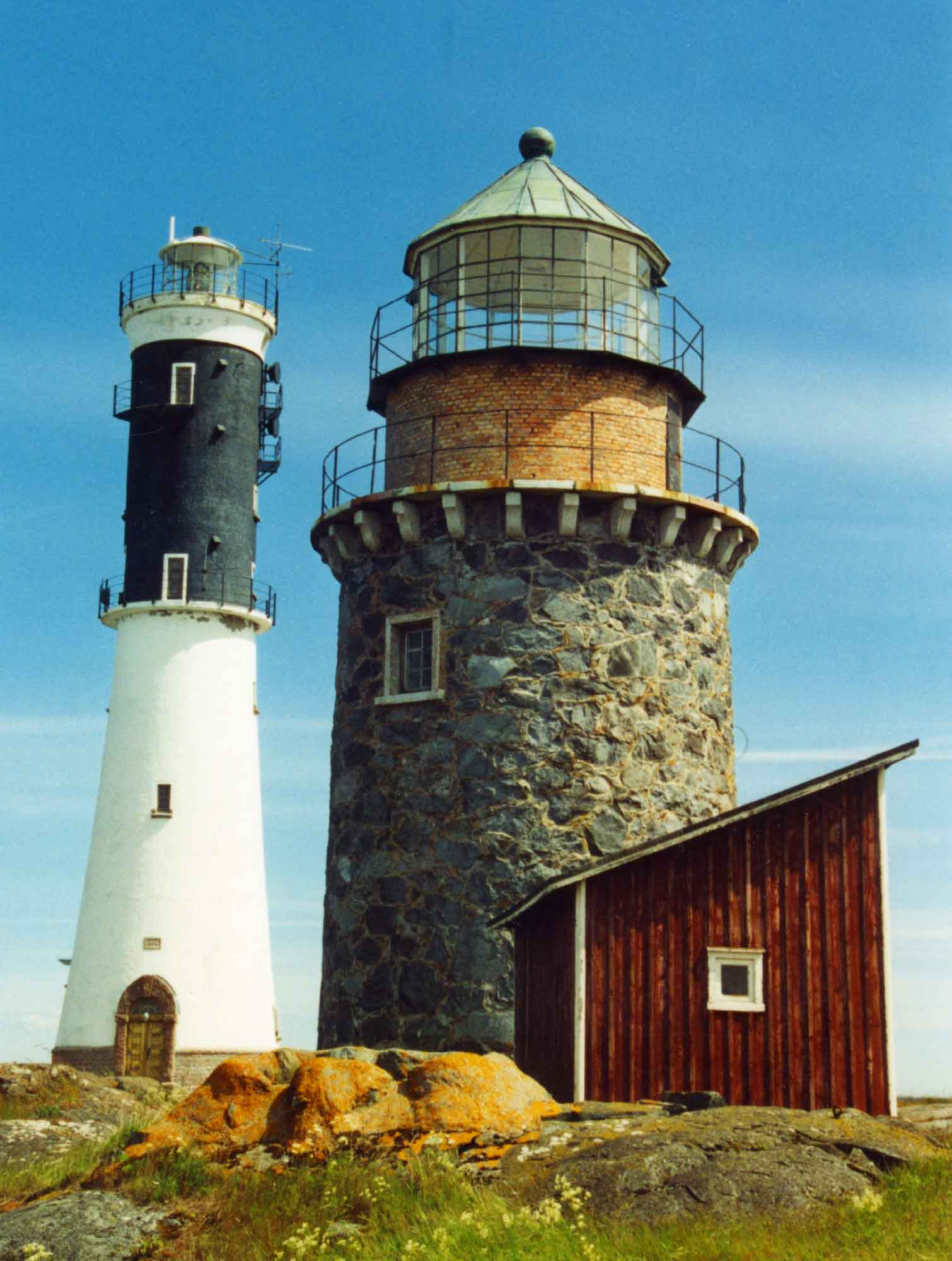
- The old lighthouse is the unpainted tower.
- Constructed: 1847
- Construction: natural stone
- Height: 16 m (52 ft)
- Shape: cylindrical tower with balcony and lantern
- Markings: Grey
- Power source: rapeseed oil, kerosene
- Heritage: governmental listed building
- First lit: 11 November 1848
- Deactivated: 1916
- Focal height: 24.3 m (80 ft)
- Lens: 10 parabolic mirrors
- Range: 14 nmi (26 km; 16 mi)
- Characteristic: Exting (1916–)

Understen is a Swedish island and lighthouse station located in South Kvarken, east of Öregrund at the northern tip of sea of Åland in Sweden.

== History ==
The first day beacon on the island was built in the 18th century. The first lighthouse was built in 1848, and lit in November that year with a colza oil lamp. In 1880 a kerosene lamp was added but the lighthouse was considered too short (13 metres) and weak, and plans for the construction of a more powerful tower started. In 1916 the new much higher tower was completed and fitted with a powerful rotating Fresnel lens in 1922. The old tower was not demolished and survives to this day, but its light equipment was removed.

The keepers left their job in 1968, after the tower was automated in 1966. The island has been used as a station for the Swedish military due to its strategic location in the sea, and was staffed by military personnel in 1975–1996. On the island is also an observation tower built by the military. That tower is today fitted with remote controlled cameras observing the sea traffic in the area. The lighthouse remains in use and is still powered with electric cable and 1000 watt bulbs. It is owned by the Swedish Maritime Administration, and remote controlled from their headquarters in Norrköping. For many years, to visit the island permission had to be granted by the Swedish marine, but it is uncertain if this is valid nowadays (2010). The island can be observed on a distant view to the north from the ferries traveling between Grisslehamn and Ekerö on Åland.

SMA has confirmed that many Russian and Swedish mines dating from the first and second world war may still lie on the sea bottom east of the light station, making anchoring or diving dangerous in the area.

== See also ==
- List of lighthouses and lightvessels in Sweden
