= Almagrundet =

Almagrundet lighthouse Almagrundet
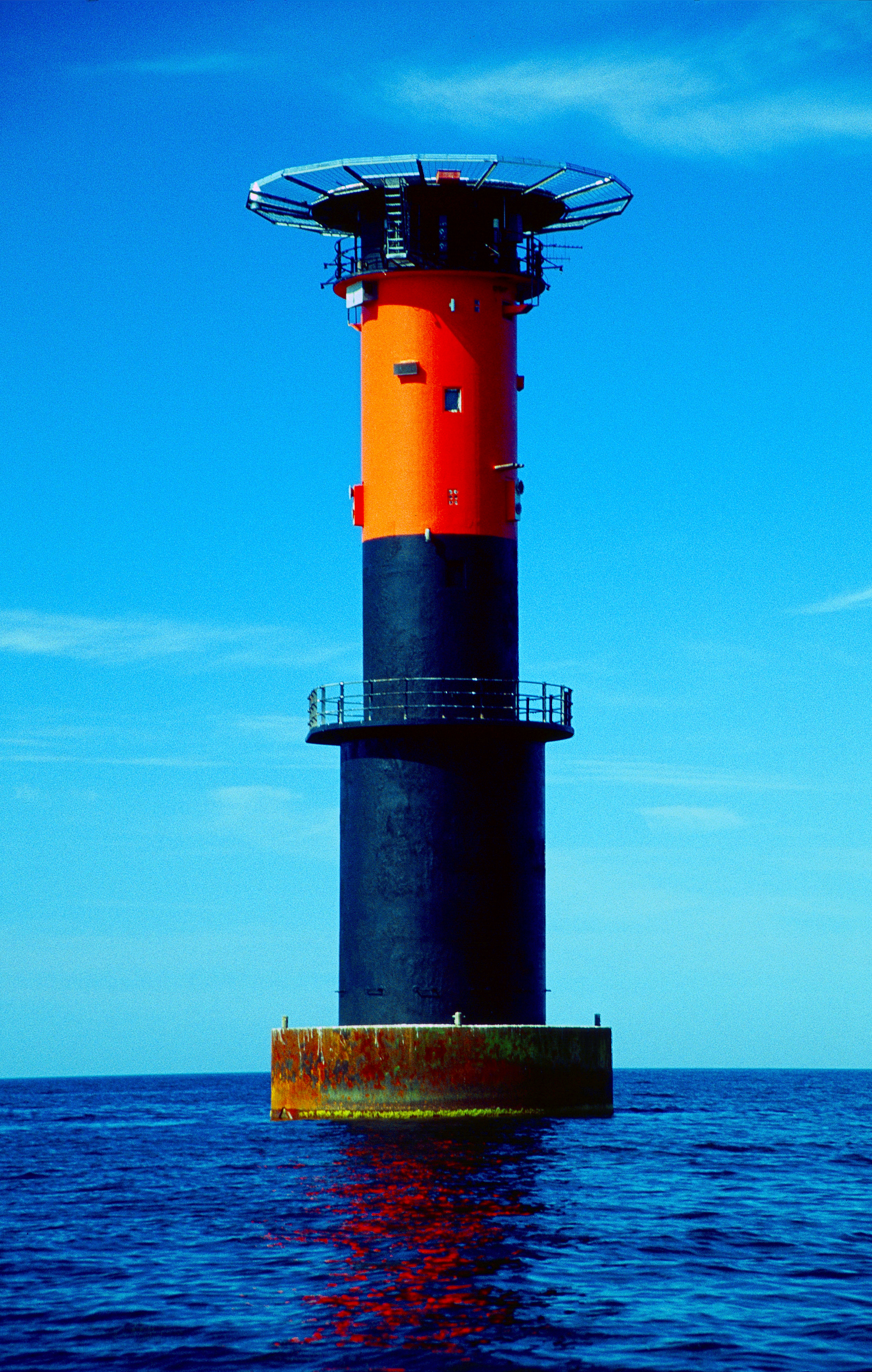
- Almagrundet Lighthouse
- Location: southeast of Sandhamn
- Coordinates: 59°16′N 19°31′E

Tower
- Constructed: 1896 (ship first)
- Construction: concrete tower
- Automated: 1964
- Height: 30 metres (98 ft)
- Shape: cylindrical tower with double balcony, lantern and helipad on the top
- Markings: black tower with a broad red band in the upper part
- Power source: electricity, solar cell panel
- Operator: Swedish Maritime Administration
- Racon: (– – •)

Light
- First lit: 1964 (current)
- Focal height: 28 metres (92 ft)
- Lens: 72 sealbeam lights (1964), Sabik LED 350 (2008)
- Range: 16 nautical miles (29,632 m)
- Characteristic: Fl(4) WR 12s (2009–)

Almagrundet is a Swedish lighthouse station located southeast of Sandhamn outside the Stockholm archipelago and consists of a number of basic heels at depths between 3 and 14 meters below the sea. The shoal was named after the Norwegian brig Alma got aground in heavy storm in 1866 in a place regarded as safe sea.

== History ==
Lightship no. 2B Sydostbrottet was placed in the area as a warning in 1896. In 1912, no. 6 Svenska Björn came as replacement. Both lightships was painted with Almagrundet in white letters on the sides. In 1964 a modern remote controlled concrete caisson lighthouse replaced the ships and it stands to this day. It was fitted with 72 powerful sealbeam lights, electric cable (connected to the Revengegrundet light), diesel generators, fog horns, helipad, racon, and floodlighting. There was also a kitchenette and two sleeping berths. The lighthouse was constructed in the area of Jävre-Sandholmen, near Piteå and then transported by ship to the location.

In 2008 the electric cable failed and the Swedish Maritime Administration replaced the equipment with a LED 350 powered with sun panels placed on top of the helipad.

== Gallery ==
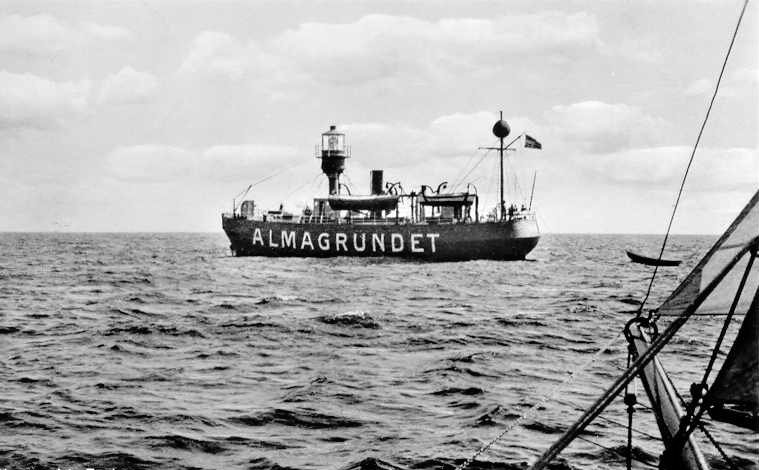
Old Lightship Almagrundet.

== See also ==
- List of lighthouses and lightvessels in Sweden
