= Skagsudde =

Skagsudde Lighthouse
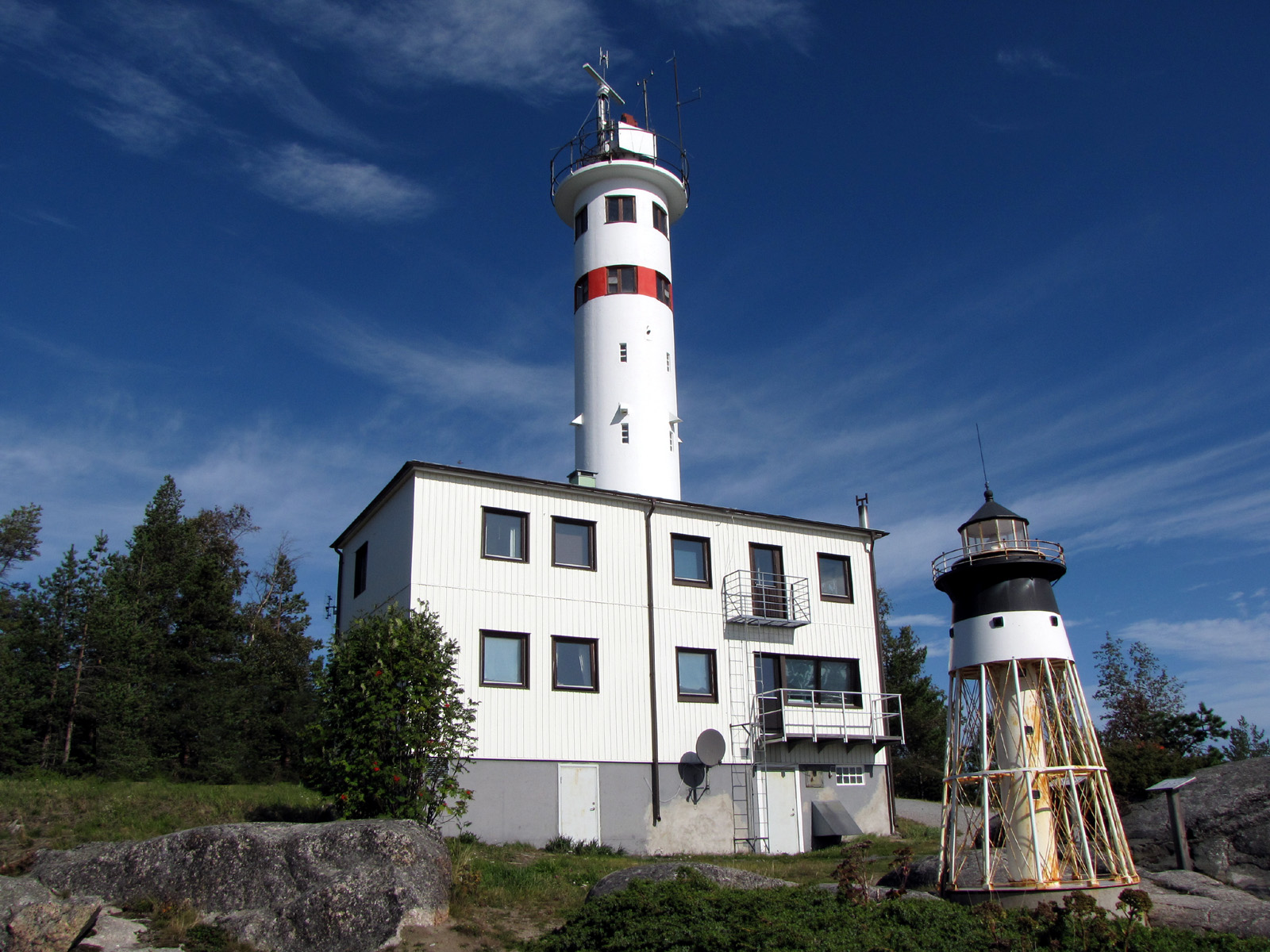
- The current and the first Skagsudde lighthouse
- Location: Skagsudde, southeast of Örnsköldsvik, Sweden
- Coordinates: 63.188085°N 19.016077°E

Tower
- Constructed: 1871 (first)
- Foundation: concrete
- Construction: concrete tower
- Automated: 1957
- Height: 26 metres (85 ft)
- Shape: cylindrical tower with lantern attached to the keeper's house
- Markings: white tower with one red band, with lantern
- Power source: electricity
- Operator: Swedish Maritime Administration (Sjöfartsverket)

Light
- First lit: 1957 (current)
- Focal height: 38.5 metres (126 ft)
- Lens: AGA 105 and 107
- Range: 21 nautical miles (39 km; 24 mi)
- Characteristic: Fl (4) W 12s.
- Sweden no.: SV-1128

Skagsudde, is a Swedish lighthouse. It was built to replace to old light station Skag located on the island Gråklubben nearby.

== History ==
Skag lighthouse was designed by engineer Nils Gustaf von Heidenstam and lit in 1877 and is now relocated complete with a Fresnel lens as a tourist attraction outside the town of Piteå.

The modern tower is of typical 1950's functionalistic design and its top holds many antennas and communications gear. Skagsudde is frequently reported as a weather station in shipping news by the Swedish Meteorological and Hydrological Institute. It is owned and remote-controlled by the Swedish Maritime Administration. It is the main lighthouse to reach the ports of Örnsköldsvik and Husum.

== Climate ==
Skagsudde has a humid continental climate due to recent mildening of the climate. It retains strong maritime influence, resulting in cool summers and milder winters than in surrounding interior low-lying areas. As typical of east coast maritime stations in Sweden, precipitation is generally low even though the climate is humid.

Climate data for Skagsudde (2002–2018); extremes since 1964
| Month | Jan | Feb | Mar | Apr | May | Jun | Jul | Aug | Sep | Oct | Nov | Dec | Year |
|---|---|---|---|---|---|---|---|---|---|---|---|---|---|
| Record high °C (°F) | 9.4 (48.9) | 8.9 (48.0) | 13.5 (56.3) | 17.8 (64.0) | 26.5 (79.7) | 27.0 (80.6) | 30.0 (86.0) | 29.0 (84.2) | 23.6 (74.5) | 19.2 (66.6) | 13.5 (56.3) | 10.6 (51.1) | 30.0 (86.0) |
| Mean maximum °C (°F) | 4.6 (40.3) | 4.8 (40.6) | 9.3 (48.7) | 12.5 (54.5) | 18.7 (65.7) | 21.4 (70.5) | 24.5 (76.1) | 22.4 (72.3) | 18.8 (65.8) | 12.7 (54.9) | 8.5 (47.3) | 6.4 (43.5) | 24.7 (76.5) |
| Mean daily maximum °C (°F) | −1.4 (29.5) | −1.6 (29.1) | 1.6 (34.9) | 5.5 (41.9) | 10.7 (51.3) | 15.4 (59.7) | 19.1 (66.4) | 18.1 (64.6) | 14.1 (57.4) | 7.9 (46.2) | 3.6 (38.5) | 1.1 (34.0) | 7.8 (46.1) |
| Mean daily minimum °C (°F) | −6.5 (20.3) | −6.8 (19.8) | −4.2 (24.4) | 0.1 (32.2) | 4.8 (40.6) | 9.7 (49.5) | 13.9 (57.0) | 13.0 (55.4) | 9.2 (48.6) | 3.4 (38.1) | −0.5 (31.1) | −3.8 (25.2) | 2.7 (36.9) |
| Mean minimum °C (°F) | −16.9 (1.6) | −17.4 (0.7) | −12.8 (9.0) | −4.9 (23.2) | −0.2 (31.6) | 5.6 (42.1) | 9.9 (49.8) | 7.7 (45.9) | 3.0 (37.4) | −3.4 (25.9) | −8.1 (17.4) | −12.9 (8.8) | −20.4 (−4.7) |
| Record low °C (°F) | −30.5 (−22.9) | −31.3 (−24.3) | −24.9 (−12.8) | −14.1 (6.6) | −6.1 (21.0) | 1.9 (35.4) | 2.4 (36.3) | 4.2 (39.6) | −2.1 (28.2) | −12.1 (10.2) | −18.6 (−1.5) | −26.6 (−15.9) | −31.3 (−24.3) |
| Average precipitation mm (inches) | 25.1 (0.99) | 19.3 (0.76) | 16.6 (0.65) | 23.5 (0.93) | 32.6 (1.28) | 38.9 (1.53) | 48.9 (1.93) | 68.6 (2.70) | 49.7 (1.96) | 49.4 (1.94) | 37.9 (1.49) | 36.7 (1.44) | 447.2 (17.6) |
Source 1: SMHI
Source 2: SMHI Monthly Data 2002-2018

== See also ==
- List of lighthouses and lightvessels in Sweden
