= Bjuröklubb =

Nature reserve in Västerbotten, Sweden

Coordinates: 64.471800°N 21.582892°E

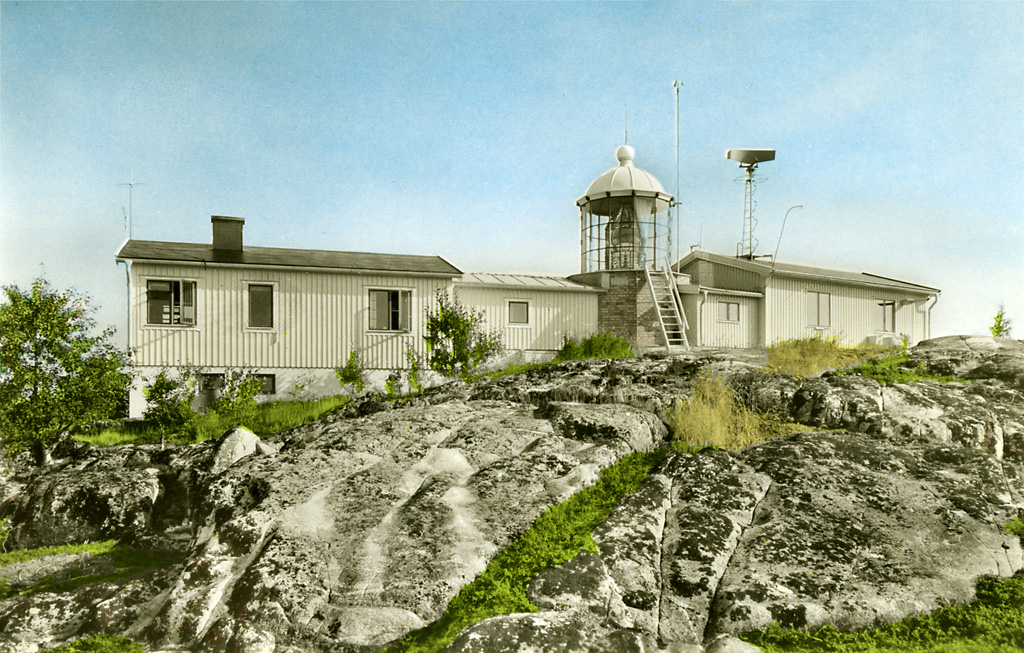
Bjuröklubb lighthouse at the coast of the Baltic Sea

Bjuröklubb is a peninsula hosting a lighthouse and a nature reserve on the Bothnian Bay in Skellefteå Municipality in Västerbotten County in northern Sweden.

== Climate ==
Bjuröklubb hosts an SMHI weather station, with a permanent record for maximum and minimum temperatures in the open data since 1951, although it has been active for overall monthly means on record since 1878 and for precipitation since 1879. It underwent a slight change of position in 1995. In spite of this, SMHI still lists all weather records for Bjuröklubb as uninterrupted from 1901 onwards in its monthly reports.

The climate of Bjuröklubb was classified as subarctic under the Köppen system (Dfc) during the 1961–1990 reference period, although it has been transitioning into a humid continental climate (Dfb) during the 21st century as a result of sizeable warming. Bjuröklubb has maritime influence from the Bothnian Bay retaining some warmth in late summer, unlike less shielded areas, although less so than coastal areas further south. The September mean was 8.7 °C (47.7 °F) during the 1961–1990 timeframe, about two degrees colder than during the first two decades of the 21st century. Winters are also more moderated due to less interior influence, with both January and February averaging −8.1 °C (17.4 °F) during 1961–1990. In spite of the winter moderation, sea ice and cold water in spring can result in individual cold extremes.

Climate data for Bjuröklubb (2002–2018; extremes since 1901)
Month	Jan	Feb	Mar	Apr	May	Jun	Jul	Aug	Sep	Oct	Nov	Dec	Year
Record high °C (°F)	10.2 (50.4)	9.2 (48.6)	13.9 (57.0)	19.5 (67.1)	26.6 (79.9)	30.7 (87.3)	32.0 (89.6)	29.2 (84.6)	23.0 (73.4)	17.0 (62.6)	11.9 (53.4)	9.9 (49.8)	32.0 (89.6)
Mean maximum °C (°F)	3.4 (38.1)	4.6 (40.3)	8.4 (47.1)	12.7 (54.9)	19.7 (67.5)	23.4 (74.1)	26.1 (79.0)	24.3 (75.7)	18.7 (65.7)	12.6 (54.7)	7.4 (45.3)	4.8 (40.6)	27.0 (80.6)
Mean daily maximum °C (°F)	−3.1 (26.4)	−3.2 (26.2)	0.7 (33.3)	5.4 (41.7)	11.1 (52.0)	15.9 (60.6)	19.7 (67.5)	18.4 (65.1)	13.7 (56.7)	6.9 (44.4)	2.4 (36.3)	−0.4 (31.3)	7.3 (45.1)
Daily mean °C (°F)	−5.7 (21.7)	−6.0 (21.2)	−2.5 (27.5)	2.2 (36.0)	7.6 (45.7)	12.4 (54.3)	16.4 (61.5)	15.4 (59.7)	10.9 (51.6)	4.8 (40.6)	0.5 (32.9)	−2.7 (27.1)	4.4 (40.0)
Mean daily minimum °C (°F)	−8.2 (17.2)	−8.8 (16.2)	−5.7 (21.7)	−1.1 (30.0)	4.0 (39.2)	8.9 (48.0)	13.0 (55.4)	12.3 (54.1)	8.1 (46.6)	2.7 (36.9)	−1.4 (29.5)	−4.9 (23.2)	1.6 (34.8)
Mean minimum °C (°F)	−18.8 (−1.8)	−19.4 (−2.9)	−14.2 (6.4)	−6.2 (20.8)	−0.3 (31.5)	4.8 (40.6)	9.2 (48.6)	7.9 (46.2)	3.1 (37.6)	−3.7 (25.3)	−8.2 (17.2)	−12.8 (9.0)	−22.6 (−8.7)
Record low °C (°F)	−35.1 (−31.2)	−32.5 (−26.5)	−28.6 (−19.5)	−17.5 (0.5)	−10.5 (13.1)	−0.5 (31.1)	5.0 (41.0)	4.0 (39.2)	−2.0 (28.4)	−11.5 (11.3)	−20.6 (−5.1)	−27.5 (−17.5)	−35.1 (−31.2)
Average precipitation mm (inches)	42.9 (1.69)	35.2 (1.39)	28.0 (1.10)	27.8 (1.09)	35.0 (1.38)	39.9 (1.57)	49.3 (1.94)	58.2 (2.29)	50.9 (2.00)	58.9 (2.32)	55.0 (2.17)	54.9 (2.16)	536 (21.1)
Source 1: SMHI Open Data
Source 2: SMHI climate data 2002–2018

== In popular culture ==
Artist Laleh released a single called Bjurö klubb in 2009.
