= Fladen =

Coordinates: 57.70864°N 11.96036°E

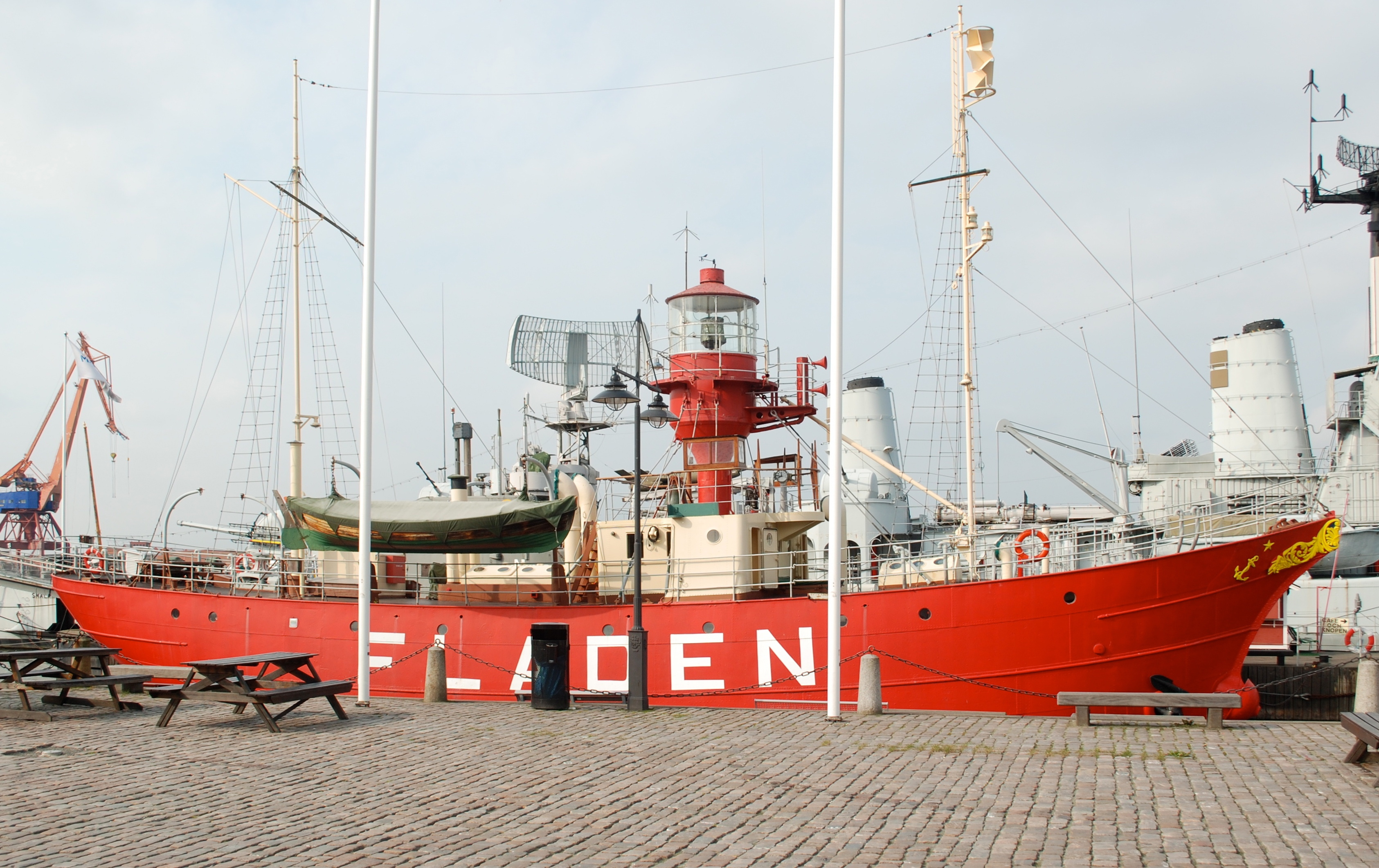
- Fladen in Gothenburg

History

Sweden
- Builder: Bergsunds Mekaniska Verkstad, Stockholm
- Laid down: 1915
- Decommissioned: 1969
- Fate: Scrapped in 2024

General characteristics
- Type: Lightvessel

Lightship No. 29 Fladen was a Swedish lightvessel, later preserved as a museum ship moored at the Maritiman maritime museum on Göta Älv in Gothenburg. She was scrapped in late 2024.

Fladen was built in 1929 at Bergsunds Mekaniska Verkstad in Stockholm. She was employed at Hävringe in the Oxelösund archipelago and at Öland reef before receiving her last assignment on the Halland coast between 1966 and 1969. She was replaced in 1969 by an anchored buoy.

== Gallery ==
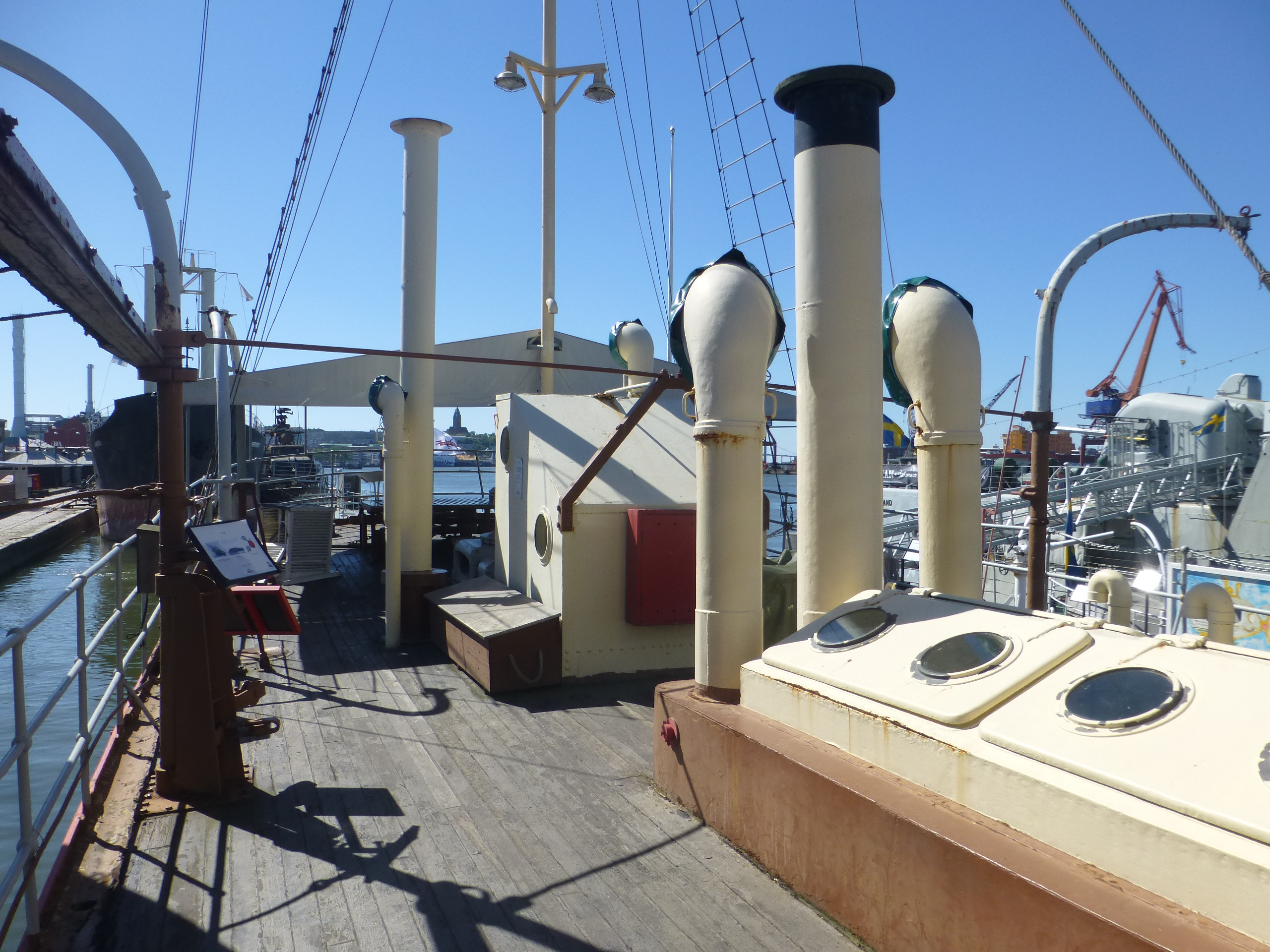

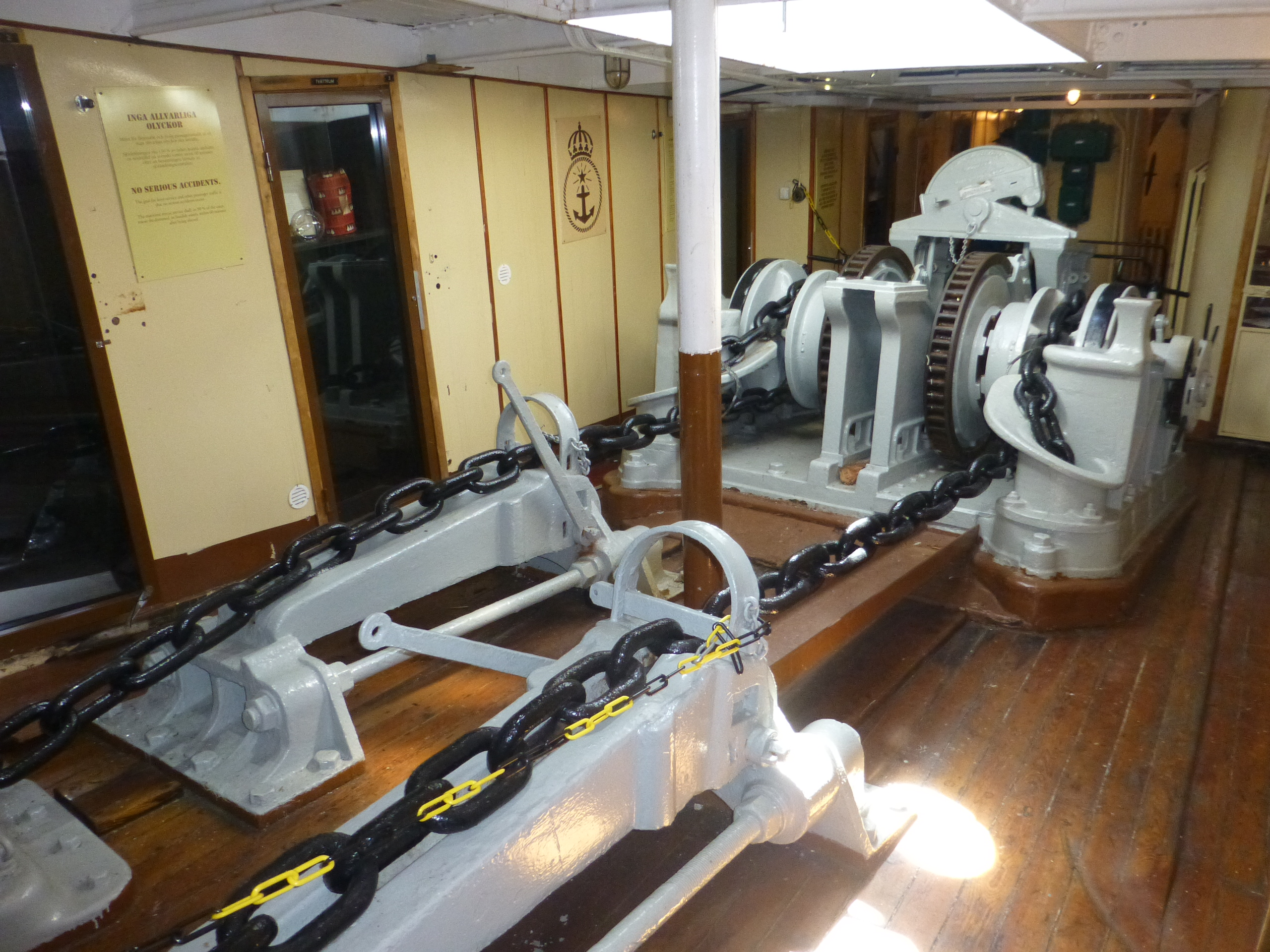

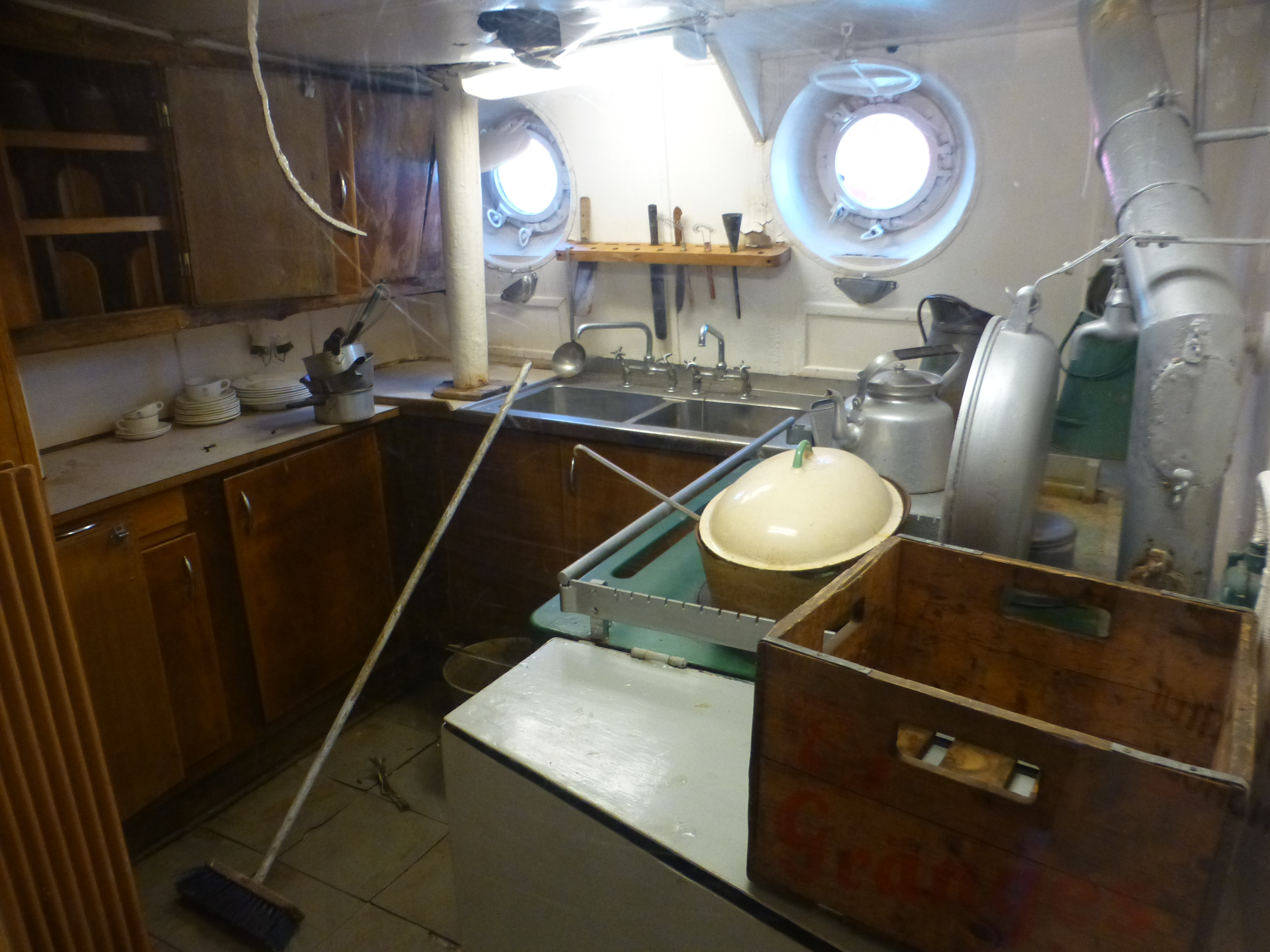

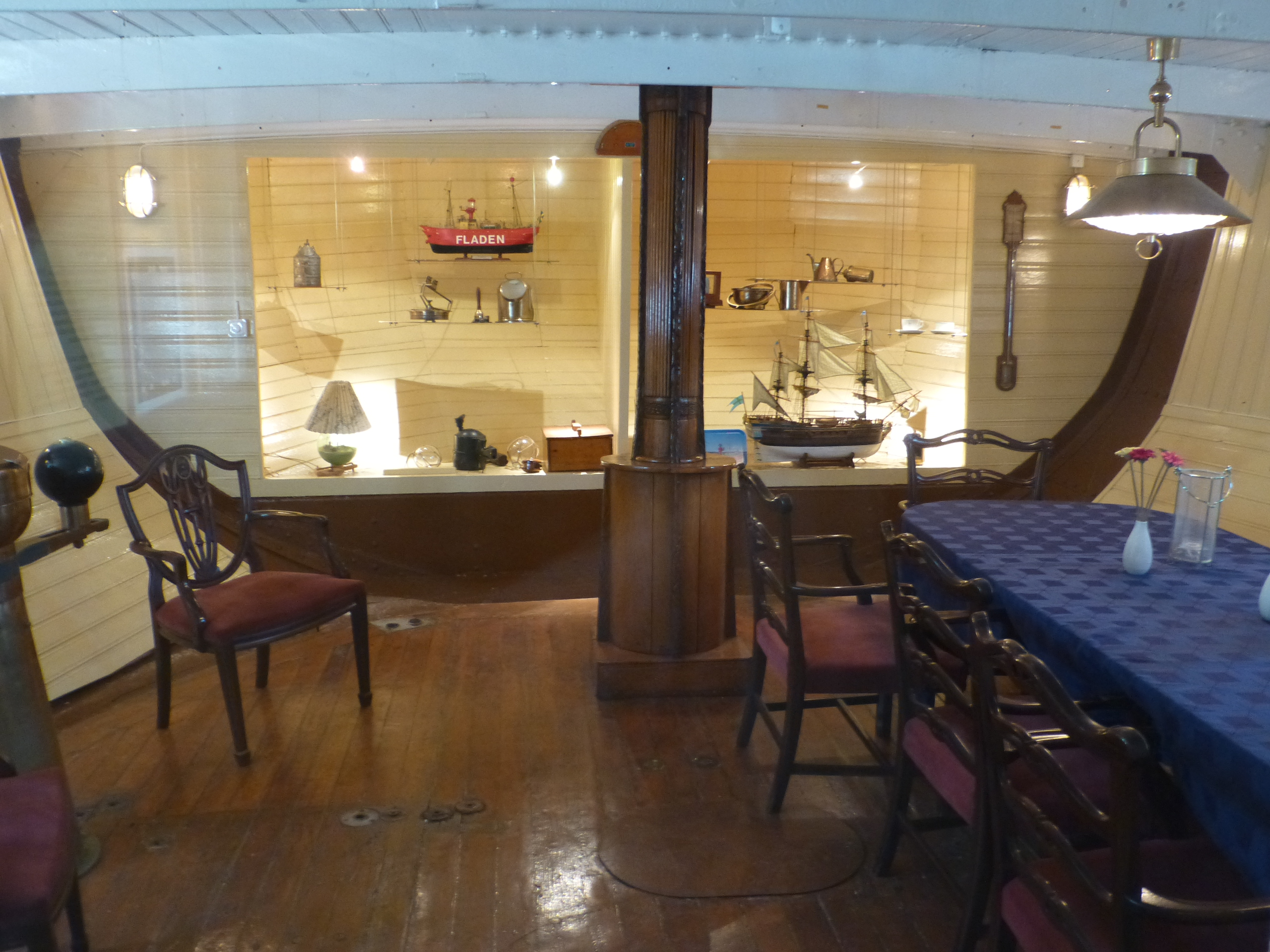

== Other sources ==
- Björn Werner (1999) Fyrskepp i Sverige (Falkenberg: C B Marinlitteratur AB) ISBN 91-973187-0-1
