= Lightship Finngrundet (1903) =

Working life museum in Stockholm Municipality, Sweden

Coordinates: 59°19′38.4″N 18°5′25.5″E

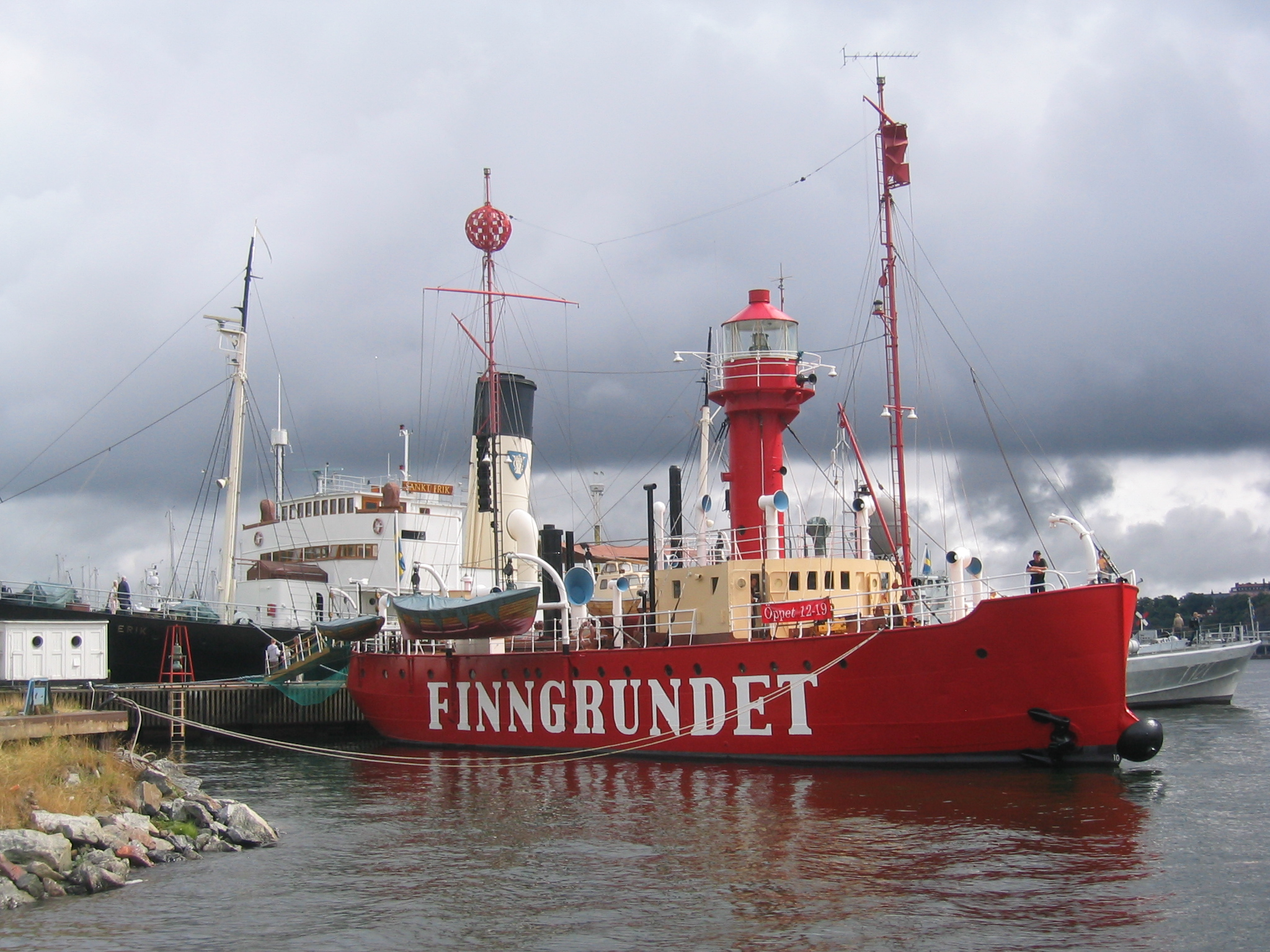
- As a museum ship in 2005

History

Sweden
- Namesake: Finngrund banks, Baltic Sea
- Builder: Gefle Mekaniska Verkstad AB
- Laid down: 1903
- Decommissioned: 14 July 1969
- Status: Museum ship on 4 June 1970 at Stockholm

General characteristics
- Type: Lightvessel
- Displacement: 264 tonnes empty, 350 fully loaded
- Length: 32.80 m (27.32 m in 1903, lengthened in 1927)
- Beam: 6.85 m
- Draft: 3.2 m (3 m in 1903, draft increased in 1927)
- Propulsion: 4-cylinder reciprocating steam engine, around 130 hp (97 kW)
- Complement: 8 crew

The Lightship Finngrundet is a lightvessel built in 1903 and now a museum ship moored in Stockholm, Sweden.

== History ==
She was the second Finngrundet lightvessel, built in Gävle, Sweden in 1903 and replacing one dating from 1859. She was stationed on the Finngrund banks in the Baltic Sea 40 nautical miles (74 km) northeast of Gävle during the ice-free part of the year.

She was extensively modified in a refit in 1927 at Öregrunds Ship och Varvs AB, the original paraffin light being replaced with an AGA beacon. The fog bell was augmented with a "nautophone" fog signal and an underwater fog signal.

Further modifications carried out in 1940 included the addition of wireless communication along with equipment for her to function as a weather station, and the electrification of her light.

Her final refit was in 1957 when the deckhouse and crew space were modified.

The optics were built by G.W. Lyth of Stockholm. They are mounted 11.5 metres above sea level and had a range of around 11 nautical miles (20 km). Two flashes were produced every 20 seconds (1 second on, 3.5 seconds off, 1 second on and 14.5 seconds off).

She was replaced in 1969 by an unmanned caisson lighthouse and became a museum ship attached to the Vasa Museum.
