= Östanå =

Östanå may refer to:

- Östanå Castle - a castle in Österåkers Municipality, Stockholm County, Sweden
- Östanå, Österåker municipality - a ferry port in Österåker Municipality, Stockholm County, Sweden
- Östanå, Östra Göinge municipality - a village in Östra Göinge Municipality, Skåne County, Sweden
- SS Östanå I - a historic former Swedish steamship, now converted to the motor vessel MV Östanå I
- SS Östanå II - a historic former Swedish steamship, now scrapped

See also

- Fabian Wrede, Count of Östanå - a 17th-century Swedish politician
- Ostana - a municipality in the province of Cuneo in Piedmont, Italy
