= SS Express =

Express was the name of a number of steamships, including:

- SS Express (1847), a London and South Western Railway ship
- SS Express (1880), tug scrapped in 1913
- SS Express (1900), a Waxholmsbolaget ship
- SS Express (1940), an American Export Lines ship
- SS Express II
