= SS Waxholm =

SS Waxholm may refer to:

- SS Waxholm (1881), a Swedish steamship built in 1881, and scrapped in 1956.
- SS Waxholm (1909), a Swedish steamship built, as SS Brevik, in 1909, renamed Waxholm in 1964, and destroyed by fire in 1978.
