= Kullervo (disambiguation) =

Kullervo is an ill-fated character in the Kalevala, the Finnish national epic.

Kullervo may also refer to:

== Compositions ==
- Kullervo (Madetoja), symphonic poem by Leevi Madetoja
- Kullervo (Sallinen), opera by Aulis Sallinen
- Kullervo (Sibelius), choral symphony by Jean Sibelius

== Others ==
- Kullervo (given name)
- Kullervo Helsinki, football club from Helsinki
- Kullervo, former name of MV Katarina
