= SS Storskär =

Listed historical ship in Sweden

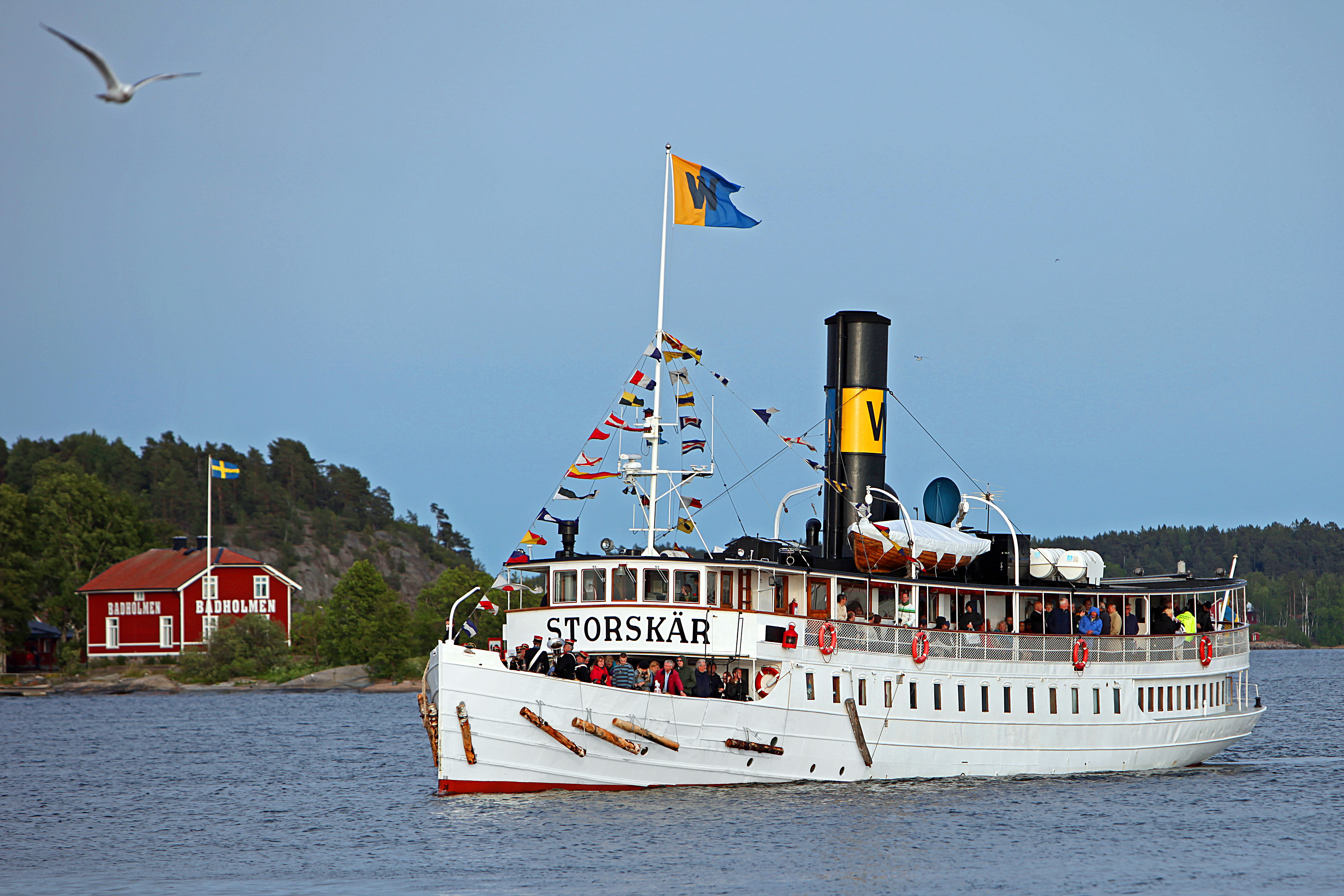

History

Sweden
- Name: Storskär
- Owner: Waxholmsbolaget
- Builder: Lindholm Shipyard, Gothenburg
- Completed: 1908
- Identification: IMO number: 5341813; MMSI number: 265522420
- Status: in service

General characteristics
- Type: Steamship
- Length: 38.95 metres (127.8 ft)
- Beam: 6.99 metres (22.9 ft)
- Draft: 2.75 metres (9 ft 0 in)
- Propulsion: Steam
- Capacity: 330 Passengers

Storskär (literally Big Skerry) is a steamship that was built in 1908 in Gothenburg. She was originally named Strängnäs Express and traded between Stockholm and Strängnäs on Lake Mälaren. She was transferred to service on the Stockholm archipelago in 1939, and given her current name in the following year. Storskär has operated for Waxholmsbolaget and her predecessors since 1939, and is today one of that company's classic fleet, alongside Norrskär and Västan. She is a listed historical ship of Sweden.

== History ==
Strängnäs Express was built by the Lindholm Shipyard in Gothenburg and was delivered to Strengnäs Nya Rederi AB in Strängnäs on 10 July 1908. As delivered she had a Lindholm triple expansion steam engine of 660 horsepower (490 kW) and, during trials, attained a speed of 14.5 knots (26.9 km/h; 16.7 mph). She was introduced in 1908 on the route from Strängnäs to Stockholm via Stallarholmen. The ship was sold in 1918 to Ångfartygs AB Drottningholm-Fittja, which in 1925 changed its name to Trafikaktiebolaget Mälaren-Hjelmaren. King Gustav V travelled on the ship from Stallarholmen to Strängnäs in 1923 in connection with the celebration of the 400th anniversary of Gustav Vasa's election as King of Sweden.

After another ownership change, Strängnäs Express was laid up in Stockholm in April 1939. In December 1939 she was purchased by Waxholms Nya Ångfartygs AB, better known as Waxholmsbolaget, who gave her her current name of Storskär in May 1940. The vessel was put into service on routes to the northern archipelago. Among other things, she traveled between Norrtälje and Arholma via Furusund. In the 1960s, Storskär became the first ship to be fitted with the Maritex system, which allowed for automated telex transmission. A new oil-fired boiler was installed in 1999 at Oskarshamns Varv.

== Operation ==
Storskär has been in regular traffic in the archipelago since 1940. She is still steam-powered and uses her original engine of 1908. Today, along with Waxholmsbolaget’s other classic ships, she is in regular traffic between May and September, serving the route from Stockholm to Vaxholm and other central archipelago islands. She has a top speed of 13 knots (24 km/h; 15 mph), which makes her the archipelago's fastest steamer.

Storskär has a length of 38.95 metres (127.8 ft), a beam of 6.99 metres (22.9 ft), a draft of 2.75 metres (9 ft 0 in), and carries 330 passengers.
