= MV Västan =

Swedish passenger ship (1900)

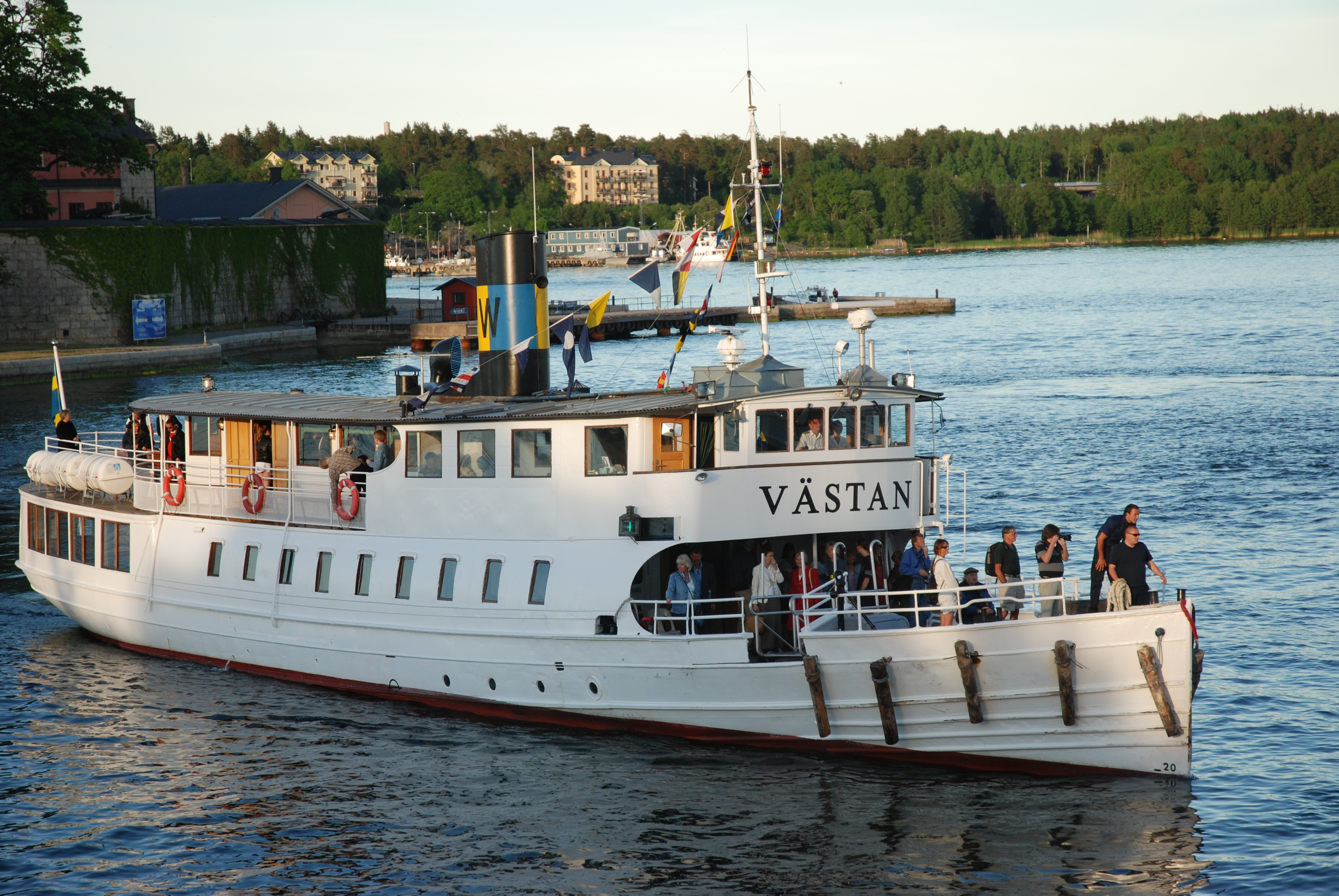

History

Sweden
- Name: MV Västan
- Owner: Waxholmsbolaget
- Builder: Motala Verkstad, Motala
- Completed: 1900
- Identification: IMO number: 5377135
- Status: in service

General characteristics
- Type: Steamship
- Length: 32.47 metres (106.5 ft)
- Beam: 5.91 metres (19.4 ft)
- Draft: 2.50 metres (8 ft 2 in)
- Propulsion: Diesel-electric
- Capacity: 180 Passengers

Västan is a motor vessel, and former steam ship, that was built in 1900 in Motala. She was originally named Nya Svartsjölandet and traded between Stockholm and Slut on Lake Mälaren. She was sold to Waxholmsbolaget for use in the Stockholm archipelago in 1937 and renamed Västan. She was converted to diesel power in 1953. The Västan is today the oldest of Waxholmsbolaget's classic fleet, operating alongside Storskär and Norrskär which, although newer, have retained their original steam propulsion. She is a listed historic ship of Sweden.

== History ==
Nya Svartsjölandet was built by the Motala Verkstad in Motala and was delivered to Nya Svartsjölandet Ångfartygs AB in May 1900. On May 21, she was introduced on the route from Stockholm and Slut via Ådö and Säbyholm. In 1937 she was purchased by Waxholms Nya Ångfartygs AB, better known as Waxholmsbolaget, and was renamed Västan. Initially the Västan operated on the Stockholm to Östhammar route.

In 1953 the Västan was rebuilt, receiving a new wheelhouse. and was converted from steam power to diesel power. Further rebuilds have taken place in 1966, 1969, 1990, 2002 and 2012. During the 2012 rebuild, a new diesel-electric power system was installed.

== Operation ==
Västan has been in regular traffic in the archipelago since 1937. Today, along with Vaxholmsbolaget's other classic ships, she is in regular traffic between May and September, serving the route from Stockholm to Vaxholm and other central archipelago islands. She has a top speed of 10.9 knots (20.2 km/h; 12.5 mph), a length of 32.47 metres (106.5 ft), a beam of 5.91 metres (19.4 ft), a draft of 2.50 metres (8 ft 2 in), and carries 180 passengers.
