= Breivika =

Breivika may refer to the following locations:

- Breivika, Møre og Romsdal, a village in Rauma Municipality in Møre og Romsdal county, Norway
- Breivika, Nordland, a village in Hadsel Municipality in Nordland county, Norway
- Breivika, Troms, a village in Harstad Municipality in Troms county, Norway
- Breivika, a part of the city of Tromsø in Tromsø Municipality in Troms county, Norway

== See also ==
- Brevik (disambiguation)
- Breivik (disambiguation)
- Breidvik (disambiguation)
