= Breivik (disambiguation) =

Breivik (transl. "broad cove") may refer to:

== People ==
- Breivik (surname)

== Places ==
- Breivik, Finnmark, in Hasvik Municipality in Finnmark county, Norway
- Breivik, Nordland, in Bodø Municipality in Nordland county, Norway
- Breivik, Telemark, in Fyresdal Municipality in Telemark county, Norway
- Breivik, Vestland, in Askøy Municipality in Vestland county, Norway

== See also ==
- Breidvik (disambiguation)
- Breivika (disambiguation)
- Brevik (disambiguation)
