= Breidvik =

Breidvik may refer to the following locations:

- Breidvik, Askøy, a village in Askøy Municipality in Vestland county, Norway
- Breidvik, Gulen, a village in Gulen Municipality in Vestland county, Norway
- Breidvik or Småland, a village in Inderøy municipality in Trøndelag county, Norway
- Breivik, Nordland, a village in Bodø Municipality in Nordland county, Norway

== See also ==
- Brevik (disambiguation)
- Breivik (disambiguation)
- Breivika (disambiguation)
