= Express II =

Express II may refer to:

- Express Airlines II - a US airline
- SS Express II (1909) - a Swedish steamship dating from 1909
