= Brevig =

Brevig may refer to:

== People ==
- Eric Brevig (born 1957), American film director
- Hans Christian Brevig (1904-1974), Norwegian farmer and politician

== Places ==
- Brevig, former name of Brevik, Norway
- Brevig, Barra, Scotland
- Brevig Mission, Alaska, United States
  - Brevig Mission Airport, Alaska, United States

== See also ==
- Brevik (disambiguation)
