= MV Östanå I =

Strömma Kanalbolaget passenger ferry and listed historic ship in Sweden

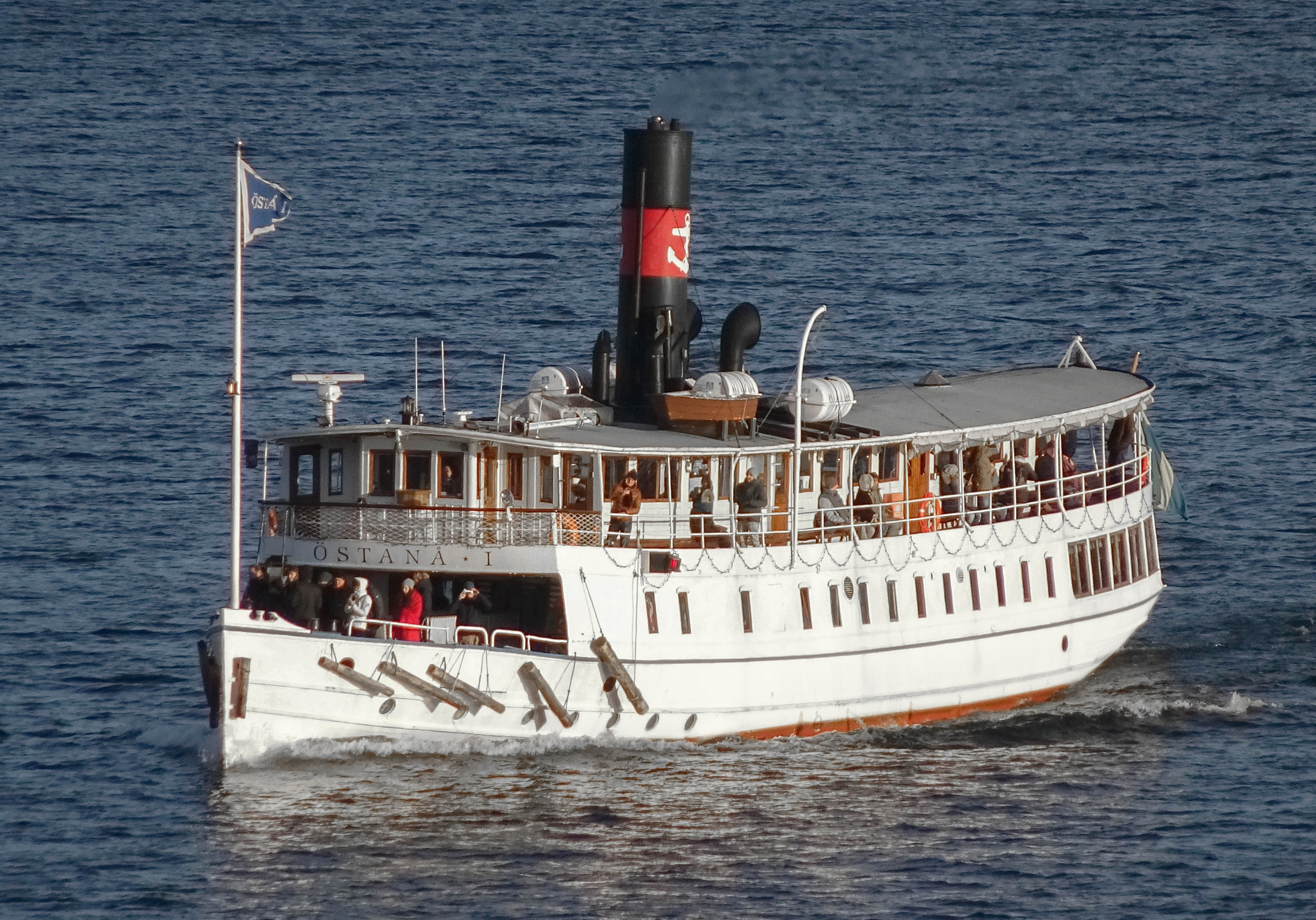
- Östanå I

History
- Name: Östanå I
- Owner: Ångfartygs AB Östanå (1906-1913); Waxholmsbolaget (1913-1964); Various (1967-1986); Strömma Kanalbolaget (1986-)
- Builder: William Lindberg's Shipyard, Sweden; Bergsund's Mechanical Workshop, Sweden
- In service: 1906
- Identification: IMO number: 5266348

General characteristics
- Type: Passenger ferry
- Length: 35.04 m (115 ft 0 in)
- Beam: 6.86 m (22 ft 6 in)
- Draught: 2.70 m (8 ft 10 in)
- Speed: 12.5 knots (23.2 km/h; 14.4 mph)

The Östanå I is a motor vessel, and former steam ship, that was built in 1905/6 at Stockholm. In 1913 she was sold to Waxholmsbolaget, with whom she remained in service until 1957. Between then and 1986 she was out of service and had a number of owners, and in 1985 she was converted to diesel power. In 1986 Strömma Kanalbolaget bought the ship. She is now used for tourist services in the Stockholm archipelago. She is a listed historic ship of Sweden.

== History ==
Östanå I was ordered in 1905 from William Lindberg's Shipyard, on Södermalm in Stockholm, but that shipyard closed before the ship was completed. The finished parts were moved to Bergsund's Mechanical Workshop, also on Södermalm, where she was completed and launched. She was delivered to her owners, Ångfartygs AB Östanå, in September 1906, and was used on their route between Stockholm and Östra Lagnö via Vaxholm, Östanå and Ljusterö. In 1908, she was joined by a sister ship, the Östanå II.

In 1913, she was sold to Waxholms Nya Ångfartygs AB, better known as Waxholmsbolaget, continuing to operate on the same route. At the end of the summer of 1957, the Östanå I was laid up, and eventually sold. Over the following years she had several owners, and was moored at various locations. In 1985, she was converted to diesel power, using a second-hand engine, and the following year she was sold to Ångfartygs AB Strömma Channel, better known as Strömma Kanalbolaget. In 1988, a new diesel engine was fitted and the vessel was renovated.

== Operation ==
The Östanå I is operated by Strömma Kanalbolaget on cruises through the Stockholm archipelago that operate from the Nybrokajen in Stockholm.

The Östanå I has a length of 35.04 metres (115.0 ft), a beam of 6.86 metres (22.5 ft) and a draft of 2.7 metres (8 ft 10 in). She has a top speed of 12.5 knots (23.2 km/h; 14.4 mph) and carries 300 passengers.
