= Brevik =

Brevik may refer to:

== People ==
- David Brevik (born 1968), an American video game designer, producer and programmer

== Places ==
=== Norway ===
- Brevik, Akershus, a village in Frogn municipality in Akershus county, Norway
- Brevik, or Store Brevik, a village in Vestby municipality in Akershus county, Norway
- Brevik, Norway, a town (and former municipality) in Porsgrunn municipality in Telemark county, Norway
- Brevik Church, a church in the town of Brevik in Porsgrunn municipality in Telemark county, Norway
- Brevik Station, a former railway station located at Strømtangen in the town of Brevik in Porsgrunn, Norway

=== Sweden ===
- Brevik, Sweden, a town on the island of Lidingö, Stockholm County, Sweden

=== United States ===
- Brevik, Minnesota, an unincorporated community in Boy Lake Township, Cass County, Minnesota, United States

== Other ==
- Brevik Line, a 10-kilometre (6.2 mi) long railway which runs from Eidanger to Brevik in Porsgrunn, Norway
- Norcem Brevik, a cement factory located at Brevik in Porsgrunn, Norway
- SS Brevik (1909), a Swedish steamship built in 1909

== See also ==
- Brevig (disambiguation)
- Breivik (disambiguation)
