= Breivik (surname) =

Breivik is a Norwegian surname meaning "broad cove". Notable people with the surname include:

- Anders Behring Breivik (born 1979), perpetrator of the 2011 Norway attacks
- Ane Breivik (born 1998), Norwegian politician
- Anne Breivik (1932–2012), Norwegian painter
- Bård Breivik (1948–2016) Norwegian sculptor
- Birger Breivik (1912–1996), Norwegian politician
- Dag Petter Breivik (born 1970), Norwegian footballer
- Eirik Langedal Breivik (born 1998), Norwegian orienteering competitor
- Emil Breivik (born 2000), Norwegian footballer
- Gunnar Breivik (born 1943), Norwegian sociologist
- Harald Breivik (born 1940), Norwegian physician
- Marit Breivik (born 1955), Norwegian handball coach and player
- Terje Breivik (born 1965), Norwegian politician
- Thomas Breivik (born 1977), Norwegian footballer
