= SS Norrskär =

Historical ship in Sweden

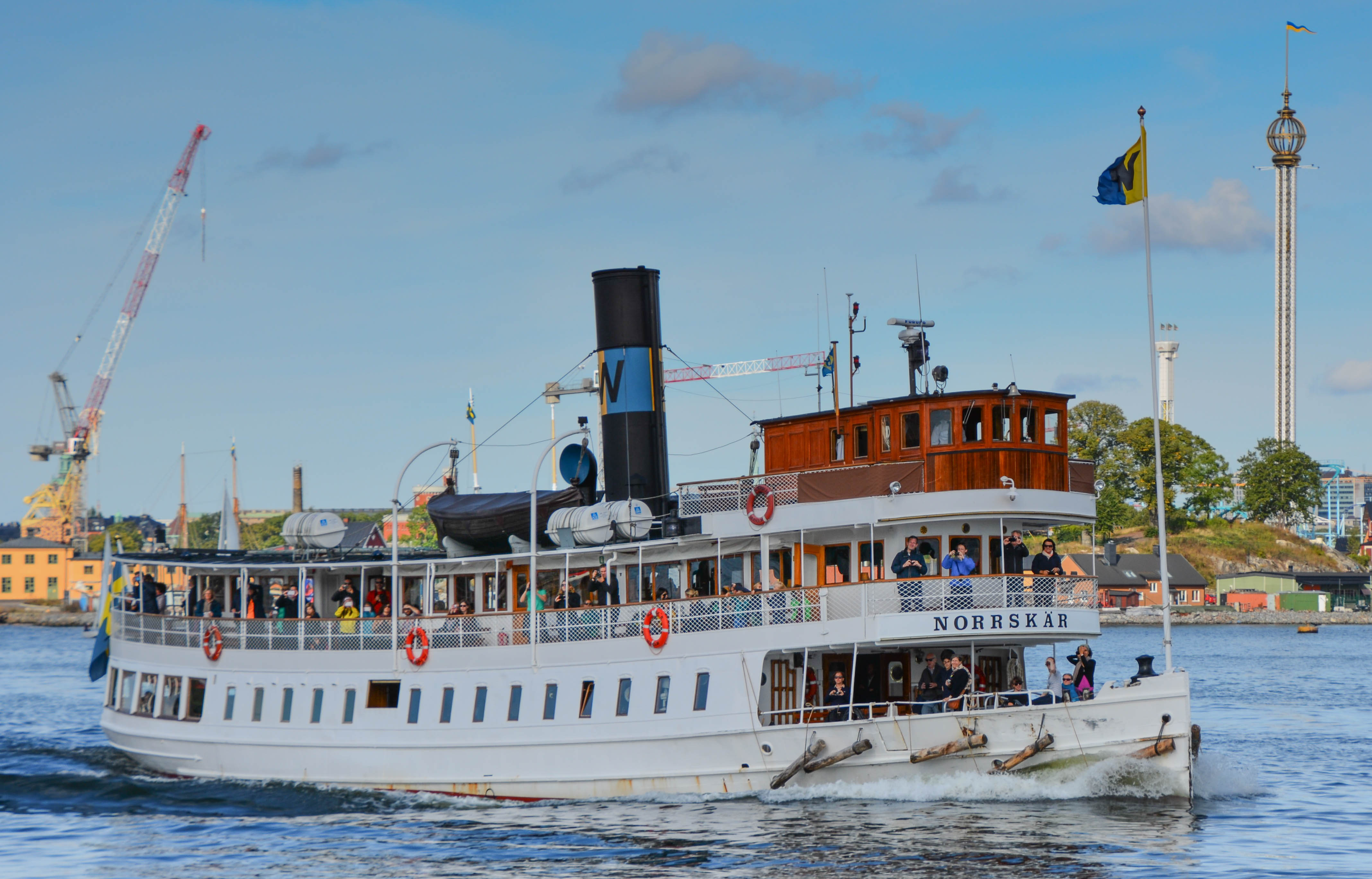
- SS Norrskär passing Gröna Lund in Stockholm

History

Sweden
- Name: Norrskär
- Owner: Waxholmsbolaget
- Builder: Eriksbergs Shipyard, Gothenburg
- Completed: 1910
- Identification: IMO number: 5256537; MMSI number: 265522430
- Status: In service

General characteristics
- Type: Steamship
- Length: 34.84 metres (114.3 ft)
- Beam: 6.88 metres (22.6 ft)
- Draft: 3.05 metres (10.0 ft)
- Propulsion: Steam
- Capacity: 265 Passengers

The steamship Norrskär (literally North Skerry) was built in Gothenburg in 1910. Originally named Sandhamns Express, she traded between Stockholm and Sandhamn in the Stockholm archipelago. She was sold to Waxholmsbolaget in 1947 and gained her current name in 1949. Today Norrskär is a listed historic ship of Sweden and forms part of Waxholmsbolaget's classic fleet, alongside Storskär and Västan.

== History ==
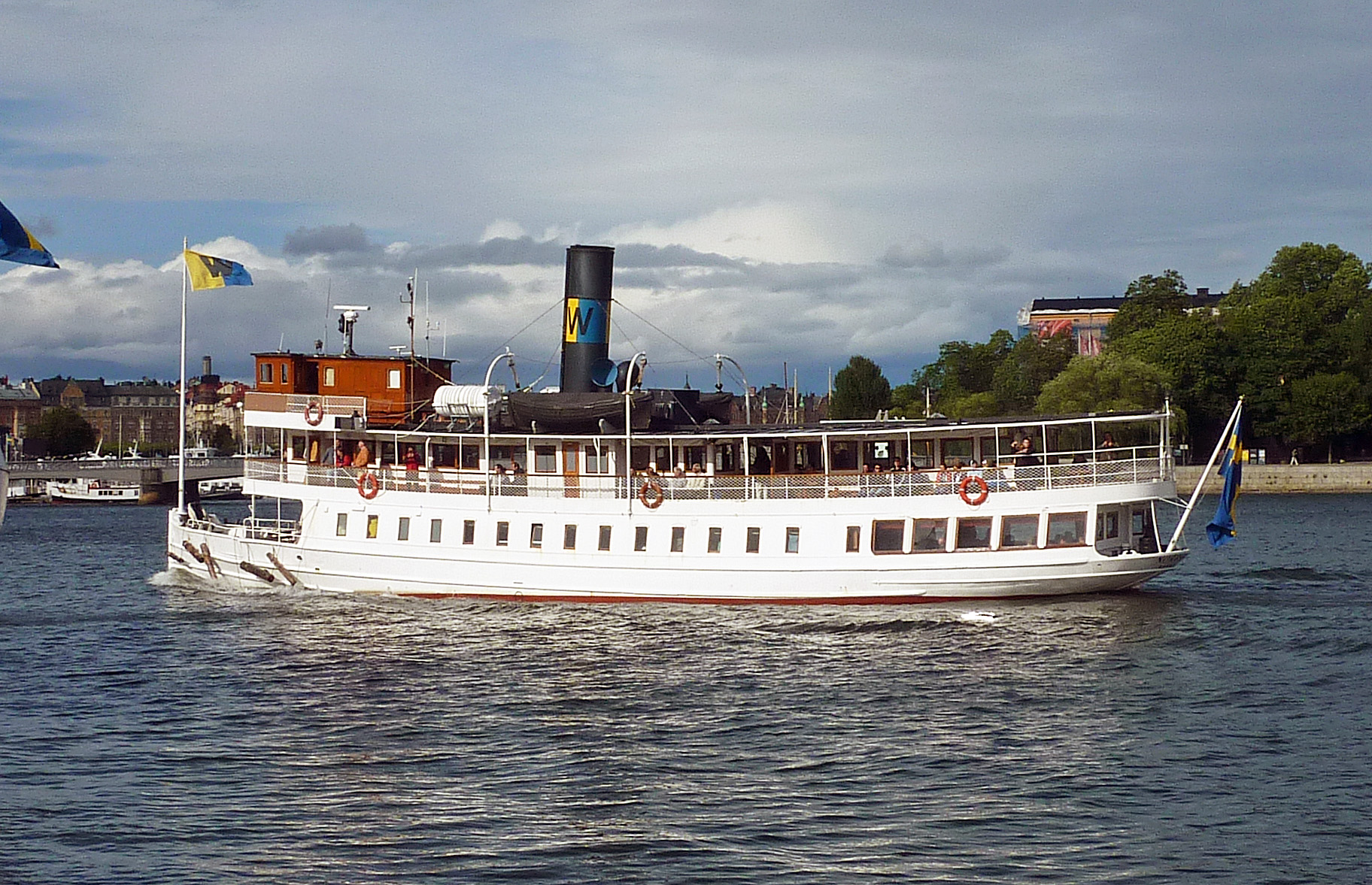
Stern view of Norrskär 2022

Sandhamns Express was built by the Eriksbergs Shipyard in Gothenburg and was delivered to Oscar Seippel on April 5, 1910. On April 24, she was introduced on the route from Stockholm to Sandhamn via Vindö, Djurö and Runmarö. The ship was sold in 1915 to Stockholm - Sandhamns Rederi AB, whilst continuing to serve the same route. In 1947 she was purchased by Waxholms Nya Ångfartygs AB, better known as Waxholmsbolaget, when her previous owners ceased trading. She was renamed Norrskär in 1949, when she was moved from the Sandhamn route to serve other routes within the archipelago.

In 1967 the Norrskär suffered a fire during welding on the hull, but was repaired. She has received replacement boilers in 1970 and 2000, and a new wheelhouse in 1993.

== Operation ==
Norrskär has been in regular traffic in the archipelago since she was built. Today, along with Vaxholmsbolaget's other classic ships, she is in regular traffic between May and September, serving the route from Stockholm to Vaxholm and other central archipelago islands. She has a top speed of 11 knots (20 km/h; 13 mph), a length of 34.84 metres (114.3 ft), a beam of 6.88 metres (22.6 ft), a draft of 3.05 metres (10.0 ft), and carries 265 passengers.
