= Östanå Castle =

- Österåker Municipality, Sweden
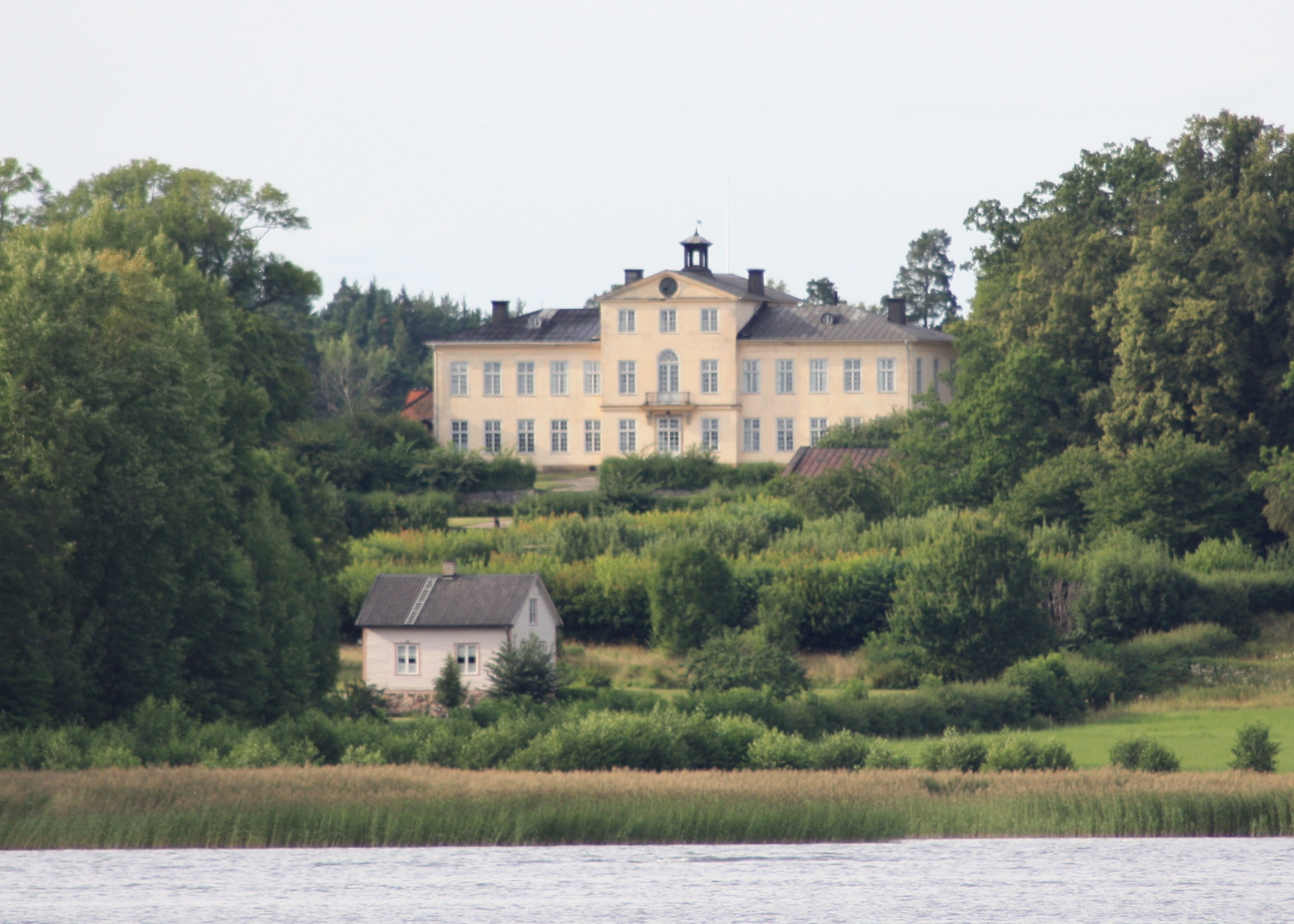

Site information
- Type: Castle

Location
- Coordinates: 59°33′26″N 18°34′42″E

Östanå Castle (Swedish: Östanå slott) is a castle in Sweden. It is located in the Österåker Municipality of Stockholm County, and is situated some 50 kilometres (31 mi) north-east of Stockholm City. The castle overlooks the main shipping channel into Stockholm through the Stockholm archipelago, and the ferry port of Östanå, from which ferries cross to the island of Ljusterö, lies just to the west of the castle.

Between the 14th and 17th centuries, various families from the Swedish nobility owned the castle. In 1687, the castle was owned by Fabian Wrede. The original wooden building was destroyed in 1719, during the Russian Pillage, and the current main building was built between 1791 and 1794. At the end of the 19th century the castle was home to Erik Gustaf Boström, the then prime minister of Sweden. The Boström family sold the castle in 2006, and by 2016 it was in a poor state of repair, and up for sale for 35 million kronor.

== See also ==
- List of castles in Sweden
