= SS Express I =

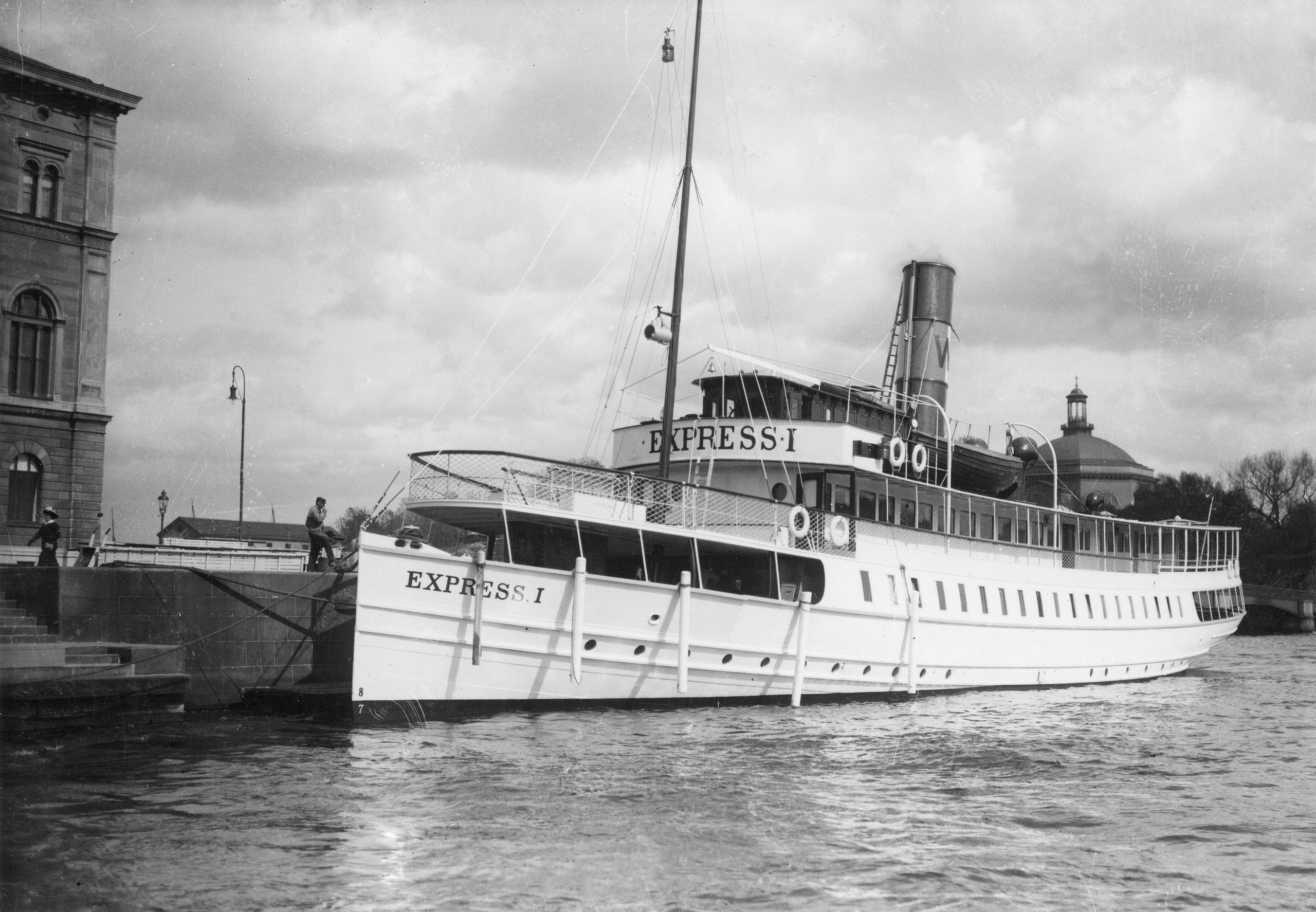
- Express I at Stockholm

History
- Name: Express (1900–1913); Express I (1913–1961)
- Owner: Waxholmsbolaget
- Builder: William Lindberg's Shipyard, Sweden
- Fate: Scrapped 1961

General characteristics
- Type: Steam passenger ferry
- Length: 44.07 m (144 ft 7 in)
- Beam: 8.1 m (26 ft 7 in)
- Draught: 3.4 m (11 ft 2 in)

Express I was a steam ship that was built in 1900, as the Express, for the Waxholmsbolaget. She remained on that company's Stockholm archipelago passenger ferry services for her working life, being renamed Express I in 1913, laid up in 1956 and scrapped in 1961.

== History ==
The Express was ordered in 1898 from William Lindberg's Shipyard on Södermalm, Stockholm, Sweden. She was delivered in 1900 to Waxholms Ångfartygs AB, better known as the Waxholmsbolaget, and initially used on that company's route from Stockholm to Vaxholm. In 1913 she was renamed Express I, at the same time as the company introduced the Express II. In 1951 the Express I was transferred to the service from Stockholm to Björkö via Blidösund and Rådmansö. After the end of the summer season in 1956 she was laid up, and in 1961 she was scrapped.
