= Djurgården ferry =

Inner city ferry route in Stockholm, Sweden

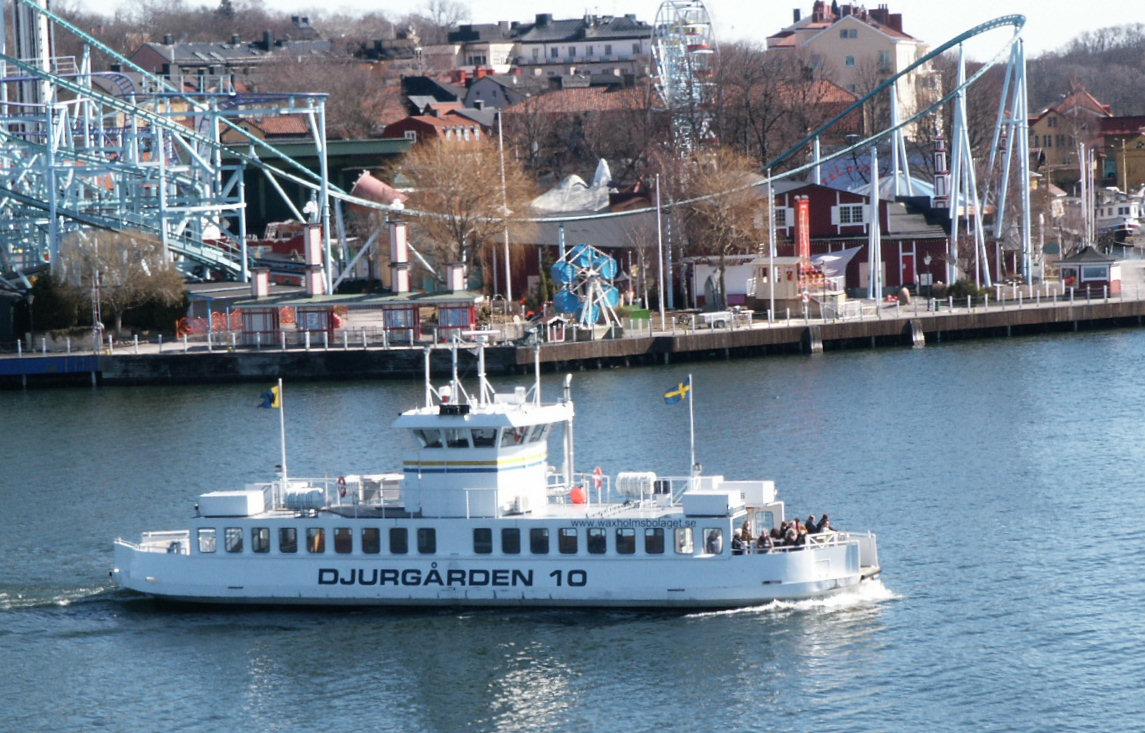
- Djurgården ferry, with Gröna Lund behind
- Carries: Passengers
- Operator: Waxholmsbolaget, contracted to Djurgårdens Färjetrafik
- No. of vessels: 4

The Djurgården ferry (Swedish: Djurgårdsfärjan) is an inner city ferry route in Stockholm, Sweden. It runs from a terminal near Slussen, in the old town of Gamla Stan, to Allmänna gränd on the island of Djurgården, with an optional stop at the island of Skeppsholmen. The service is integrated into Stockholm's public transport system, as route 82, and accepts all the relevant tickets of Storstockholms Lokaltrafik (SL).

It is operated on behalf of SL by Waxholmsbolaget and its sub-contractors, Djurgårdens Färjetrafik.

All of the ferry's stops are close to visitor attractions, with the Slussen terminal close to the old city centre and the Royal Palace, the Skeppsholmen stop near to the Moderna Museet, and the Djurgården terminal close to the Gröna Lund amusement park, the Vasa Museum and the Skansen open-air museum.

== Operation ==
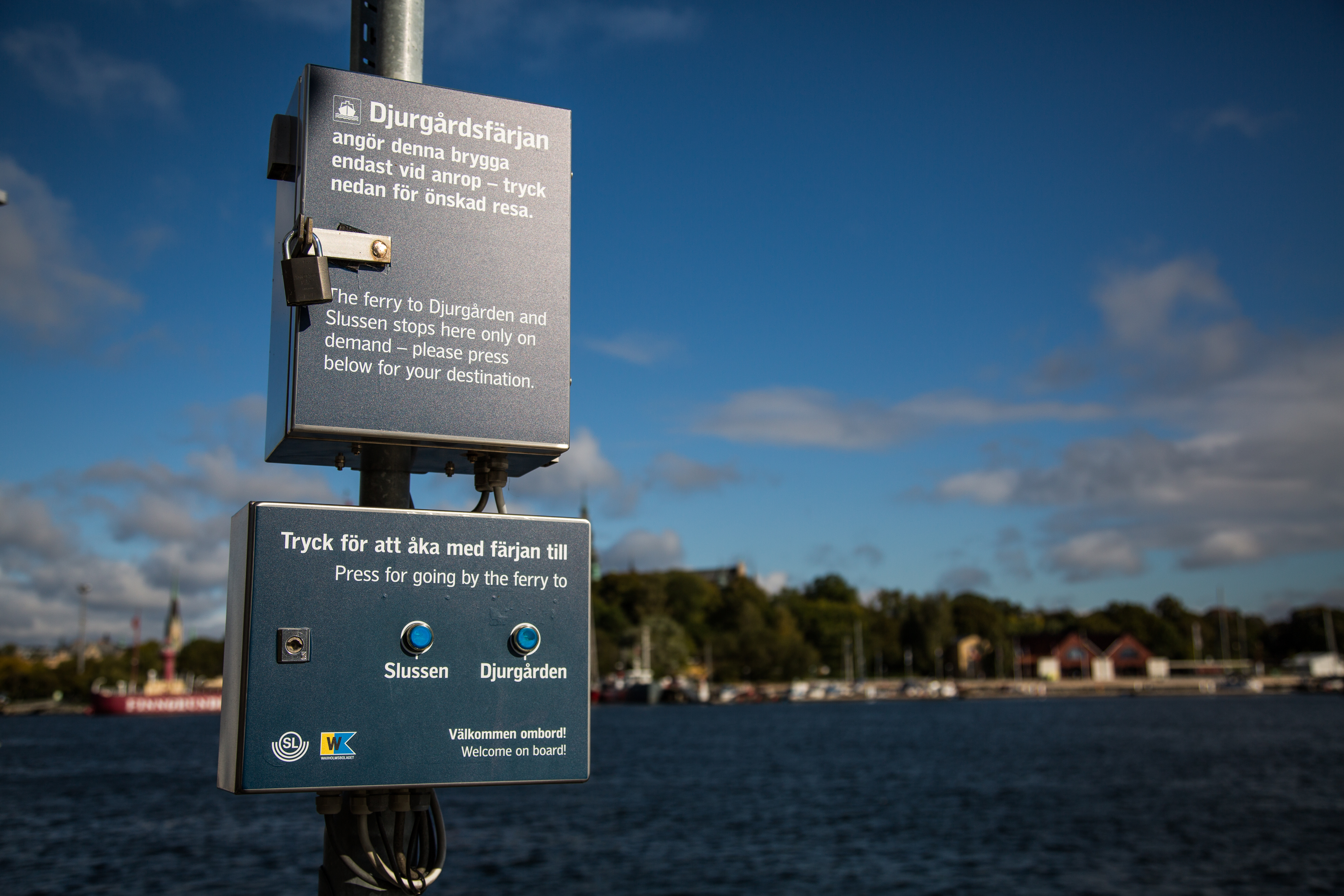
From Skeppsholmen, ferry service is available upon request only

Depending on the time of day and day of the week, the ferries operate three, four or six times per hour. Two ferries are normally required to operate services, with an extra ferry required for the six services per hour frequency. The service carries some 2.2 million passengers a year.

Not all trips stop at Skeppsholmen, and a journey to or from there may require a passenger to travel via Slussen or Djurgården. Skeppsholmen is a request stop and passengers wishing to disembark there must inform a crew member on boarding. Passengers wishing to join the ferry are required to summon the ferry by pressing a button at the stop.

== History ==
Ferry traffic in Stockholm's harbour dates to the 18th century, when rowing boats were stationed at different locations. During the 19th century steam ferries took over traffic to be followed by modern motor-powered ferries. However road and rail routes increasingly took over, and the Djurgården ferry is one of the few of the harbour ferries to have survived.

Waxholmsbolaget took over the Djurgården ferry in 1970. In 2014 the responsibility for the ferry service was transferred to Storstockholms Lokaltrafik (SL), and it was fully integrated into that body's ticketing system. Waxholmsbolaget continue to own the ferries, and subcontracts their operation to Djurgårdens Färjetrafik, who are a joint venture of Serco and Strömma Turism & Sjöfart.

== Current fleet ==
Name	Built	Description	Image
Djurgården 8	1977	Djurgården 8 is 25.32 metres (83.1 ft) in length, with a beam of 6.85 metres (22.5 ft), a draught of 2.22 metres (7 ft 3 in), and a capacity of 300 passengers. A Scania diesel engine of 312 horsepower (233 kW) gives a speed of 9 knots (17 km/h; 10 mph). The hull was built by Oxelösunds Svets & Smide AB of Oxelösund, with superstructure by Boghammar Marin AB of Lidingö. She was remodelled in 2002 by Oskarshamns varv of Oskarshamn, with a new larger wheelhouse and a new engine.	
Djurgården 9	1981	Djurgården 9 is 27 metres (89 ft) in length, with a beam of 6.85 metres (22.5 ft), a draught of 2.22 metres (7 ft 3 in), and a capacity of 300 passengers. A Scania diesel engine of 300 horsepower (220 kW) gives a speed of 9 knots (17 km/h; 10 mph). The hull was built by Kalmar Fartygsreparationer AB of Kalmar, with superstructure by Boghammar Marin AB of Lidingö. She was remodelled in 2005 by Oskarshamns varv of Oskarshamn, with a new larger wheelhouse. Her engine was replaced in 2011.	
Djurgården 10	1982	Djurgården 10 is 27 metres (89 ft) in length, with a beam of 6.85 metres (22.5 ft), a draught of 2.22 metres (7 ft 3 in), and a capacity of 300 passengers. A Scania diesel engine of 270 horsepower (200 kW) gives a speed of 9 knots (17 km/h; 10 mph). The hull was built by Kalmar Fartygsreparationer AB of Kalmar, with superstructure by Boghammar Marin AB of Lidingö. She was remodelled in 2004 by Oskarshamns varv of Oskarshamn, with a new larger wheelhouse.	
Djurgården 11	1998	Djurgården 11 is 27 metres (89 ft) in length, with a beam of 6.9 metres (23 ft), a draught of 2.22 metres (7 ft 3 in), and a capacity of 298 passengers. A Scania diesel engine of 270 horsepower (200 kW) gives a speed of 8 knots (15 km/h; 9.2 mph). The hull was built by Poul Ree A/S of Stokkemarke in Denmark, with superstructure by Boghammar Marin AB of Lidingö.	
