= Ramsö =

Island in the Stockholm archipelago and Vaxholm municipality, Sweden

- Location within Stockholm Location within Sweden Location within European Union
- Coordinates: 59°23′4″N 18°24′27″E
- Country: Sweden
- Province: Uppland
- County: Stockholm County
- Municipality: Vaxholm Municipality
- Time zone: UTC+1 (CET)
  - Summer (DST): UTC+2 (CEST)

Ramsö is an island in the Stockholm archipelago in Sweden. Rindö island lies to its north, Tynningö island to its south-west, Skogsön island to its south-east, and the Oxdjupet strait to its east. Administratively, it is in Vaxholm Municipality and Stockholm County. The island consists of three parts: Ramsö itself, Ramsöholm and Ramsöberg. Ramsöholm was separate from Ramsö until the 18th century, but is now joined to the rest of the island after the channel between the two was infilled. Ramsöberg began to be built up in the 1960s.

Ramsö has no road connection to the mainland or other islands. It is served throughout the year by passenger ships of the Waxholmsbolaget, which call at the Ramsö pier and/or the Ramsöberg pier, providing a connection to Vaxholm town and Stockholm city.

The island is the home to three shipyards: Ramsövarvet, Abrahamsson and Börjesson's shipyard and Blomberg's shipyard.

== Gallery ==
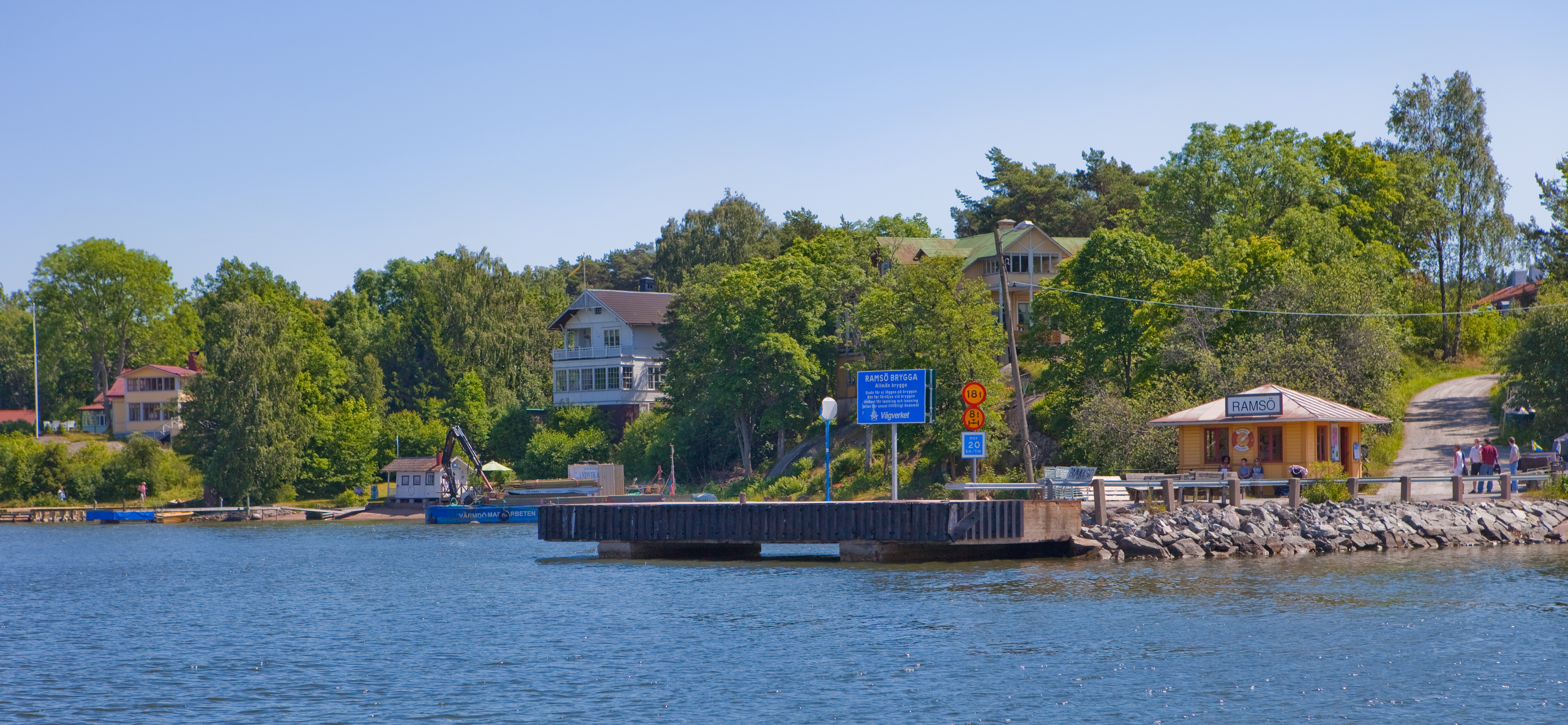
The Ramsö pier, served by Waxholmsbolaget ships

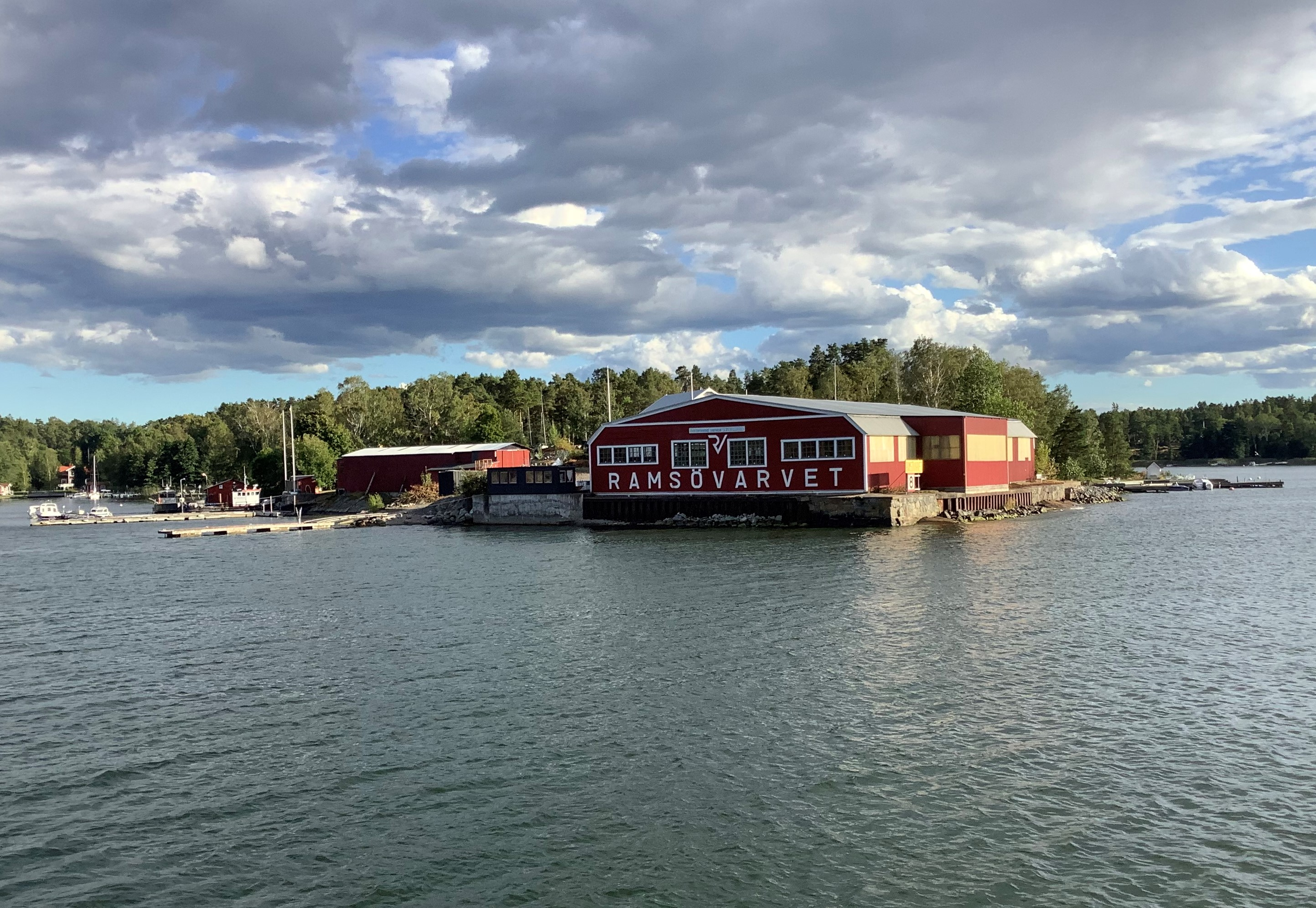
Ramsövarvet, one of the shipyards on the island
