= Maritex =

Maritex system logo

Maritex was a Swedish maritime telecommunication system enabling fully automated shortwave telex transmission between ship radio stations at sea and telex subscribers on land. Televerket tested the system in the 1960s in the North Sea and the coast radio station in Gothenburg. The service was launched in mid-1972 and was decommissioned on 31 December 2000, when the development of satellite communications rendered the Maritex technology obsolete.

The ship's equipment consisted of an error-correcting control computer called ARQ (Automatic Repeat Request) and a dedicated Maritex receiver that scanned selected frequency bands to receive calls. Additionally, there was a link between the ARQ and the ship's main transmitter, as well as a telex terminal.

When the ARQ detected a call from a land station via its receiver, the ship's transmitter would automatically activate and respond to the call. Once the call was established, the message was received. The land station would send three characters at a time, and if the ship's station confirmed that the characters had been received correctly, the next three characters would be sent. If the received characters were incorrect, the last three characters would be sent again, and so on. Contact from the ship to the land station was performed in a similar manner.

Because the shore station had to handle many simultaneous calls from ships, each radio channel in the system had a transmitter, a receiver, and an ARQ unit. When a shore telex subscriber sent a message to a ship subscriber, the shore station computer responded and received the message. The appropriate radio channel was then selected, the ship was called, and the message was transmitted.

Due to changing shortwave conditions, ship availability was variable. In 1980, statistics showed that 80% of Maritex messages reached ships within two hours, and 50% within 30 minutes.

== See also ==
- Telex
