= Kullervo (given name) =

Kullervo is a given name. Notable people with the name include:

- Kullervo Leskinen (1908–1989), Finnish sports shooter
- Kullervo Manner (1880–1939), Finnish journalist and politician
