= Brevig, Barra =

Coordinates: 56.962°N 7.446°W

Brevig: Scottish Gaelic: Brèibhig
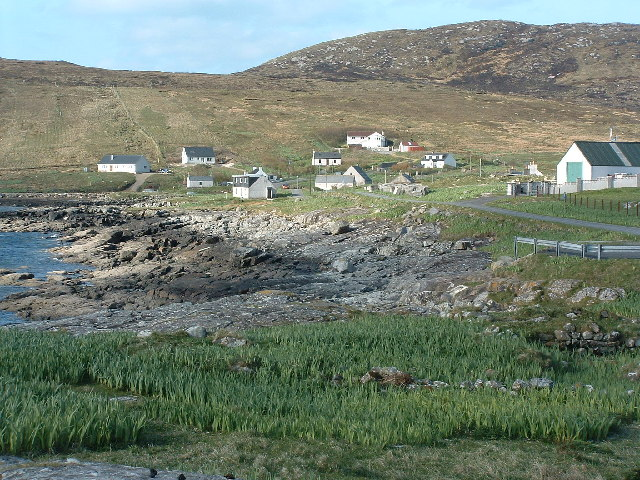
- The village of Brevig on the east coast of Barra

- Location within the Outer Hebrides
- Language: Scottish Gaelic; English
- OS grid reference: NL690988
- Civil parish: Barra
- Council area: Na h-Eileanan Siar
- Lieutenancy area: Western Isles
- Country: Scotland
- Sovereign state: United Kingdom
- Post town: ISLE OF BARRA
- Postcode district: HS9
- Dialling code: 01871
- Police: Scotland
- Fire: Scottish
- Ambulance: Scottish
- UK Parliament: Na h-Eileanan an Iar
- Scottish Parliament: Na h-Eileanan an Iar

Brevig (Scottish Gaelic: Brèibhig) is a village on the island of Barra, in the Outer Hebrides, Scotland. The settlement is situated on the A888, which is Barra's circular main road. Brevig is also within the parish of Barra.

The Druim A' Charra standing stones are situated close to the settlement. The remains of other sites, which were possibly stone circles, are also in the area.
