= Slut, Munsö =

Coordinates: 59°25′20″N 17°33′25″E

- Smaller locality
- Interactive map of Slut, Munsö
- Country: Sweden
- County: Stockholm County
- Municipality: Ekerö Municipality
- Time zone: UTC+1 (CET)
  - Summer (DST): UTC+2 (CEST)

Slut, Munsö is a village (smaller locality) in Ekerö Municipality, Stockholm County, southeastern Sweden. The name probably refers to a promontory on which the village is situated. Munsö is a village and a former island in Ekerö Municipality, Sweden which, because of post-glacial rebound, is now connected to the island Ekerö. The village is located on the edge of Lake Mälaren. There is a daily bus connection from Brommaplan, line 311.
