= Östanå, Österåker Municipality =

Östanå
- Location within Stockholm Location within Sweden
- Coordinates: 59°32′54.8″N 18°34′28.4″E
- Country: Sweden
- Province: Uppland
- County: Stockholm County
- Municipality: Österåker Municipality

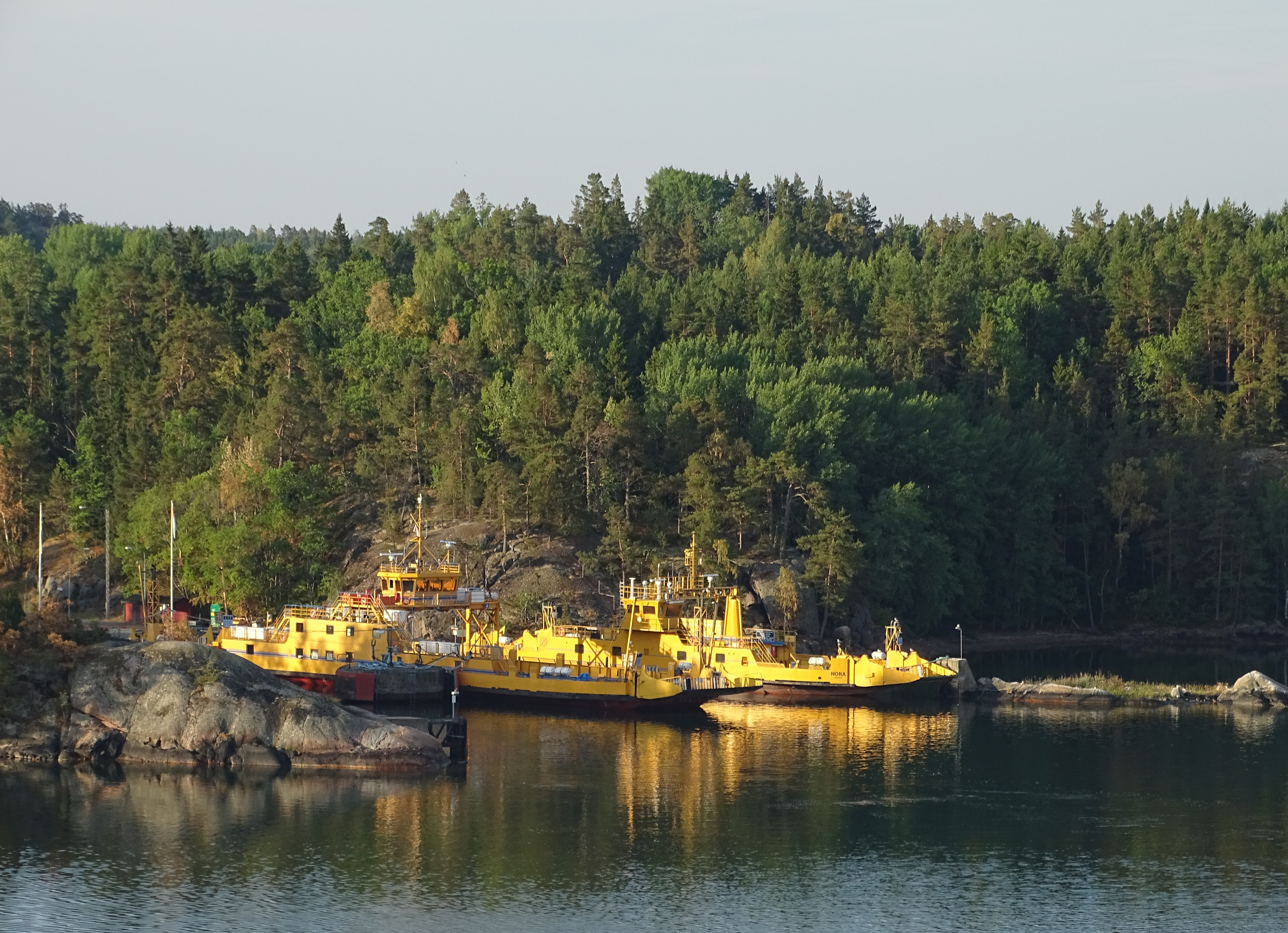
Ferry Ljusterö-Östanå

Östanå is a ferry port in the municipality of Österåker in the Swedish county of Stockholm. It is the mainland terminal of the Ljusteröleden vehicle ferry route to the island of Ljusterö, operated by Trafikverket, and is also a calling point for the passenger ferries of the Waxholmbolaget on its routes from the city of Stockholm to the northern part of the Stockholm archipelago.

Nearby is Östanå Castle, an 18th-century building on a site occupied since the 14th century, and the village of Roslags-Kulla.
