= MV Katarina =

Finnish restaurant ship and former Swedish steamship built in 1869

Coordinates: 60.446543°N 22.263544°E

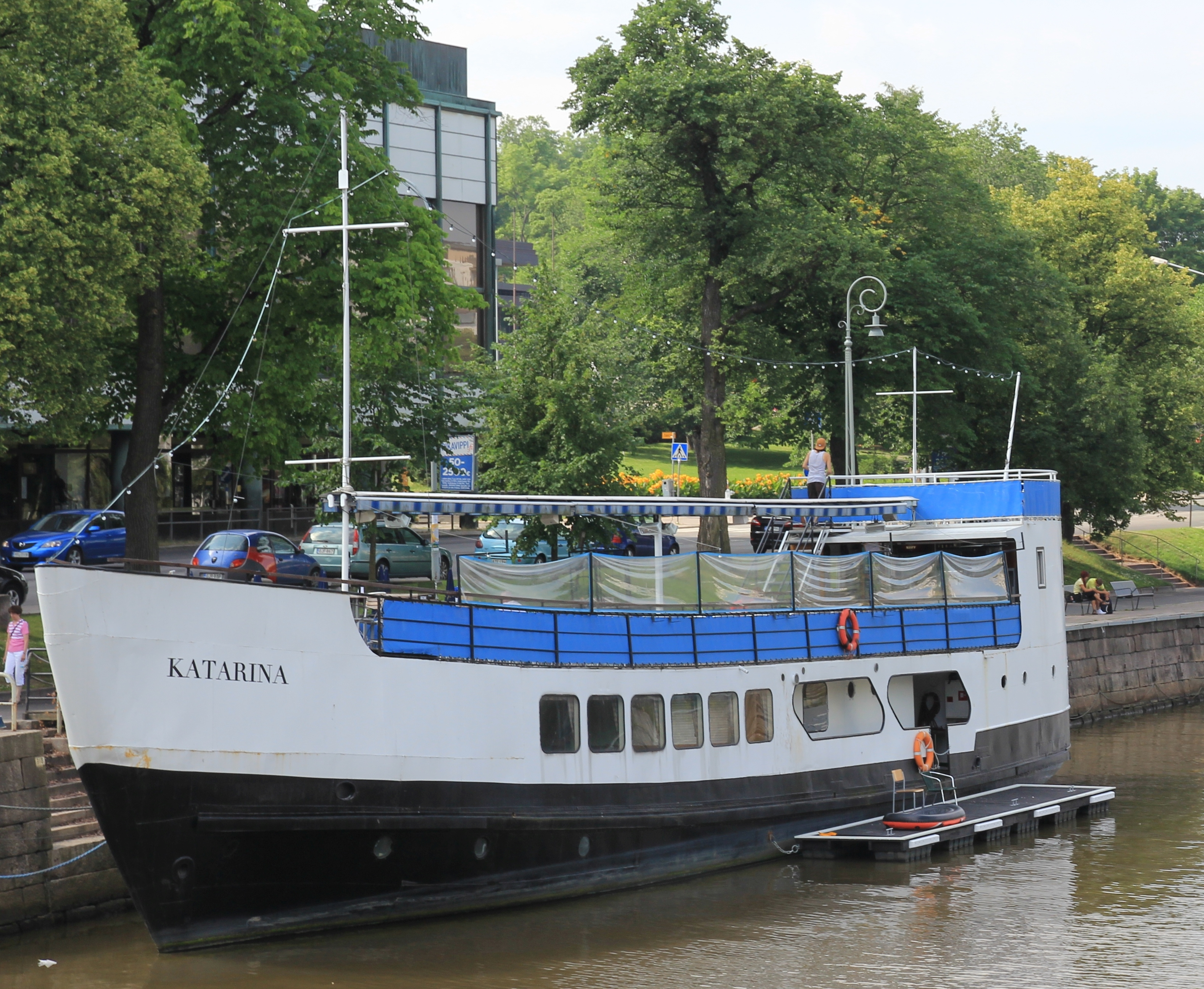
- The Katarina moored in the Aura river in Turku in 2011

History
- Name: Fredriksborg (1869–1882); Various - see text (1882–1985); Katarina (1985–)
- Owner: Waxholmsbolaget (1869–1882); Various - see text (1882–)
- Builder: William Lindberg's Shipyard, Sweden

General characteristics
- Type: Floating restaurant, former steam passenger ferry
- Length: 29.69 m (97 ft 5 in)
- Beam: 5.2 m (17 ft 1 in)
- Draught: 1.7 m (5 ft 7 in)

The Katarina is a floating restaurant, and former steam ship, that was built in 1869 at Stockholm in Sweden. Sailing under her original name of Fredriksborg on the route through the Stockholm archipelago from Stockholm to Vaxholm, she was the Waxholmsbolaget's first propeller-driven steam ship. After being sold by the Waxholmsbolaget in 1882, she operated in various roles under the names Höganäs, Mariehamn, Stella, Wirumaa, Kullervo and André before acquiring her current name in 1985. Today she is a floating restaurant moored in the Aura river in Turku, Finland.

== History ==
The Fredriksborg was built in 1869 by William Lindberg's Shipyard, on Södermalm in Stockholm, for the recently founded Waxholms Ångfartygs AB, better known as the Waxholmsbolaget. She was that company's first propeller-driven steam ship, operating between Stockholm and Vaxholm. In 1882, she was sold to Ångfartygs AB Skånska Kusten of Malmö, who renamed her Höganäs. Whilst in Malmö, she operated a route from Skanör to Mölle via Malmö, Barsebäck, Landskrona, Helsingborg and Viken.

In 1886, the Höganäs was sold to Leon Gestrin of Turku in Finland, who renamed her Mariehamn and used her on services from Turku to Mariehamn in Åland. In 1890, she was sold to Carl Georg Rosenberg, also of Turku, who renamed her Stella but continued to operate her between Turku and Mariehamn. In 1912, she was sold to the Reval Shipping Company of Tallinn in Estonia, who renamed her Wirumaa and ran her on services between Tallinn and Riga in Latvia.

In 1916, the Wirumaa was sold to a group of individual owners in the Koivisto Islands, then part of Finland, and renamed Kullervo. Over the following years she had a number of owners, being renamed André in 1922. In 1926 she was converted to a barge, and in 1956 converted again to a motor cargo vessel. In 1972 she was converted to a cruise ship, and in 1985 she was renamed Katarina.
