= SS Östanå II =

Former Swedish steam passenger ferry, built 1908, scrapped 1952

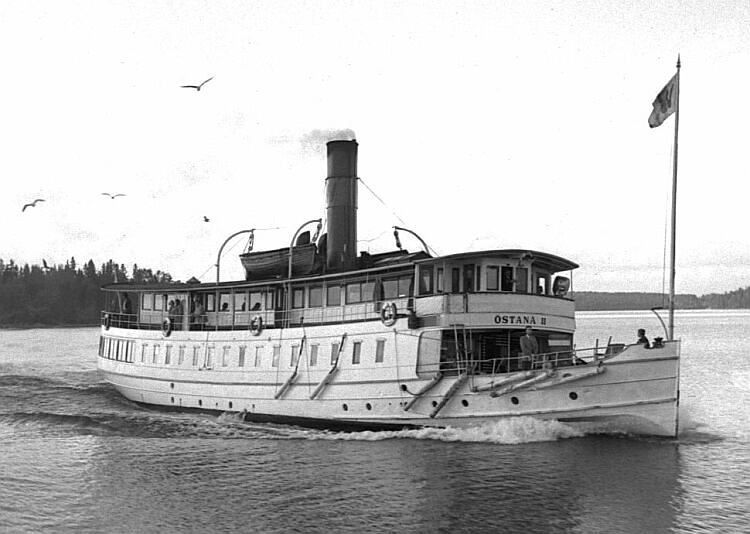
- Östanå II

History
- Name: Östanå II
- Owner: Ångfartygs AB Östanå (1908-1913); Waxholmsbolaget (1913-1952)
- Builder: Bergsund's Mechanical Workshop, Sweden
- In service: 1908
- Out of service: 1951
- Fate: Scrapped

General characteristics
- Type: Passenger ferry
- Length: 33.5 m (109 ft 11 in)
- Beam: 6.8 m (22 ft 4 in)
- Draught: 2.7 m (8 ft 10 in)

The Östanå II was steam ship, that was built in 1908 at Stockholm. In 1913 she was sold to Waxholmsbolaget, with whom she remained in service until 1951, when she went aground and sustained hull damage. In 1952 she was sold for scrap, and towed to the River Tyne in England, where she was scrapped.

== History ==
Östanå II was delivered by Bergsund's Mechanical Workshop, on Södermalm in Stockholm, as a sister ship to the slightly earlier Östanå I. She was delivered to her owners, Ångfartygs AB Östanå, in September 1908. In 1913, she was sold to Waxholms Nya Ångfartygs AB, better known as Waxholmsbolaget, who placed her in service on the route between Stockholm and Bergshamra. In 1940 she was moved to the route from Stockholm to Arholma, and in 1946 she was moved again to the route from Stockholm to Svartlöga.

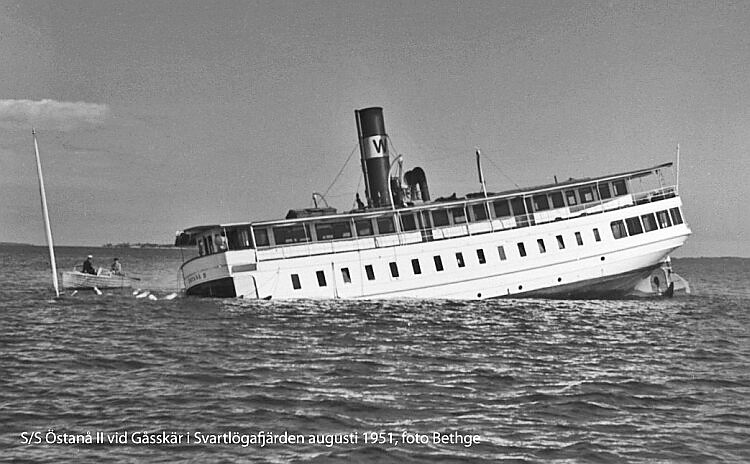
Östanå during sinking.

On the 18 August 1951, the Östanå II went aground on a trip from Svartlöga to Stockholm and started to take on water. All the passengers and crew were safely evacuated, and three days later the vessel was salvaged. However she was not repaired, and the following year she was sold for scrap, and taken in tow for a journey to a scrapyard in Newcastle upon Tyne in England. Whilst crossing the North Sea the tow was lost, but the Östanå II was then taken in tow by the Scottish steamship Quentin and taken to the River Tyne, where she was sold to CW Dorkin & Co of Gateshead and finally scrapped.
