= Thomas Breivik =

Norwegian footballer (born 1977)

Personal information
- Date of birth: 1 March 1977 (age 49)
- Height: 1.75 m (5 ft 9 in)
- Position: Defender

Youth career
- –1997: Bodø/Glimt

Senior career*
Years	Team	Apps	(Gls)
1997–2001	Bodø/Glimt	48	(2)
2002	Lofoten		
2003–2006	Innstranden		
- * Club domestic league appearances and goals

Thomas Breivik (born 1 March 1977) is a retired Norwegian football defender.

He made his Eliteserien debut for FK Bodø/Glimt in October 1997 against Viking. After four more seasons where he was a semi-regular for the last three, he joined FK Lofoten in 2002. Ahead of the 2003 season he went on to Innstrandens IL, playing there until 2006. In 2003 he was named 3. divisjon Group 21 player of the year by Avisa Nordland.
