= SS Waxholm (1881) =

History
- Name: Waxholm
- Owner: Waxholmsbolaget
- Builder: Bergsund's Mechanical Workshop, Sweden
- Fate: Scrapped 1956

General characteristics
- Type: Steam passenger ferry
- Length: 32.65 m (107 ft 1 in)
- Beam: 6.28 m (20 ft 7 in)
- Draught: 2.7 m (8 ft 10 in)
- Speed: 13 knots (24 km/h; 15 mph)
- Capacity: 385 passengers

The Waxholm was a steam ship that was built in 1881, at Stockholm in Sweden, for the Waxholmsbolaget. She operated on services throughout the Stockholm archipelago for that company until 1956, when she was scrapped.

== History ==
The Waxholm was built in 1881 by Bergsund's Mechanical Workshop, on Södermalm in Stockholm, for the Waxholms Ångfartygs AB, better known as the Waxholmsbolaget. Her design would set the pattern for the typical archipelago steamer. Initially used on the route between Stockholm and Stenslätten via Vaxholm and Oskar-Fredriksborg, the steamer would remain in service with the Waxholmsbolaget until 1956. In that year, she was sold for scrap, and was scrapped in Hamburg, Germany.

After the 1881-built Waxholm had been scrapped, the Waxholmsbolaget reused her name on a 1909-built steamer that had previously been named Express II and, before that, Brevik.
