= Ljusterö =

Island in the Stockholm archipelago

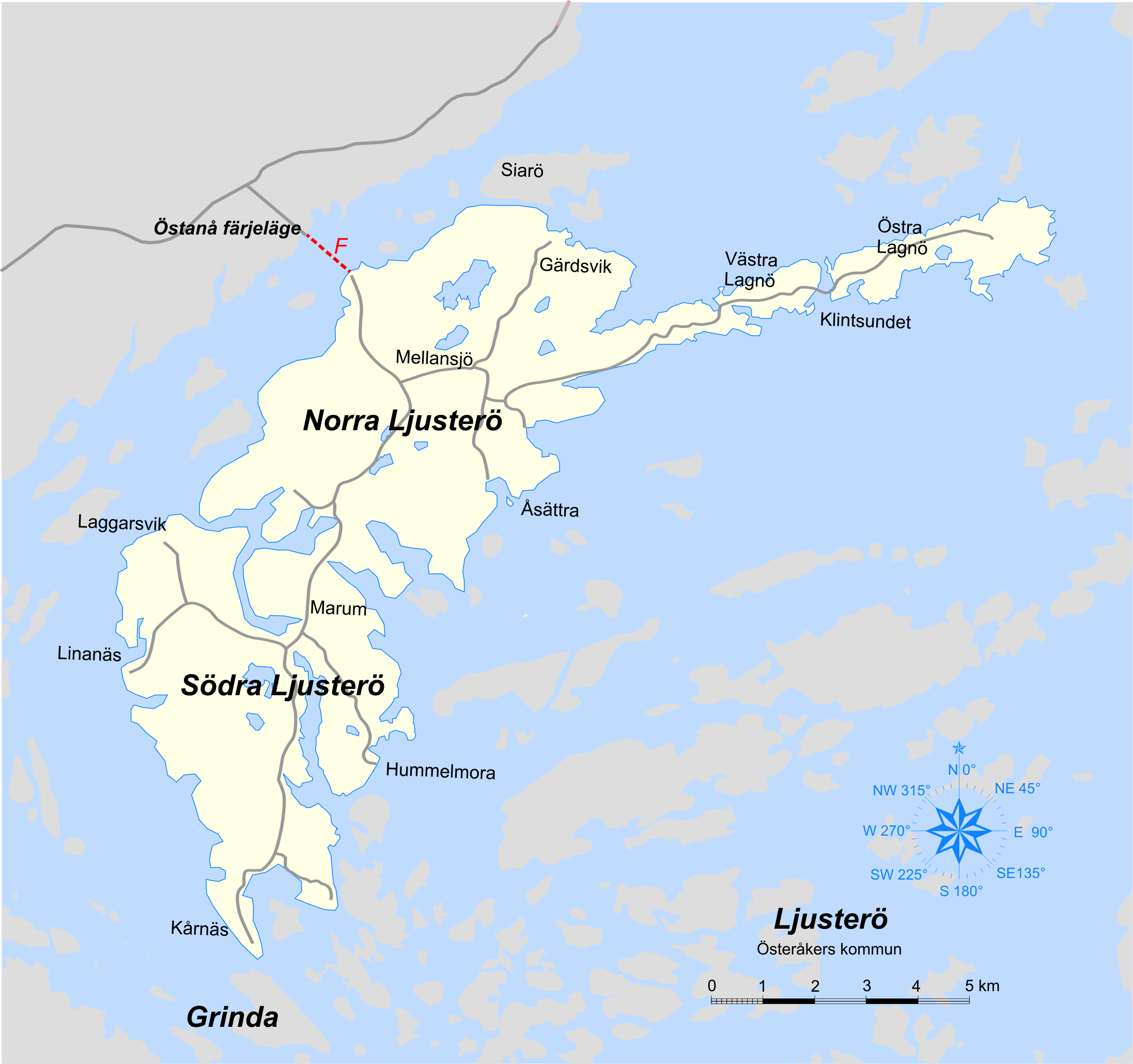
- The island of Ljusterö.

Geography
- Coordinates: 59°31′33″N 18°37′25″E
- Area: 62.05 km^{2} (23.96 sq mi)

Administration
- Sweden
- County: Stockholm
- Municipality: Österåker

Demographics
- Population: 1591

Ljusterö is an island in Sweden.

It is in the northern part of the Stockholm archipelago in Österåker Municipality, Stockholm County. It is approximately 65 kilometers north of central Stockholm.

With an area of 62.05 km^{2}, it is the 17th largest island in the country.

The island is accessed from the mainland by regular ferries from Östanå as well as by boat from central Stockholm.

It has approximately 1,500 permanent residents and 25,000-30,000 residents during the summer season due to the large number of summer houses.

== Administrative history ==
Ljusterö was originally its own municipality until 1967, when it became part of Österåker Municipality. In 1974, all of Österåker Municipality became part of Vaxholm Municipality, but since 1983, Ljusterö has been part of the new Österåker Municipality.

== Ljusterö windfarm project ==
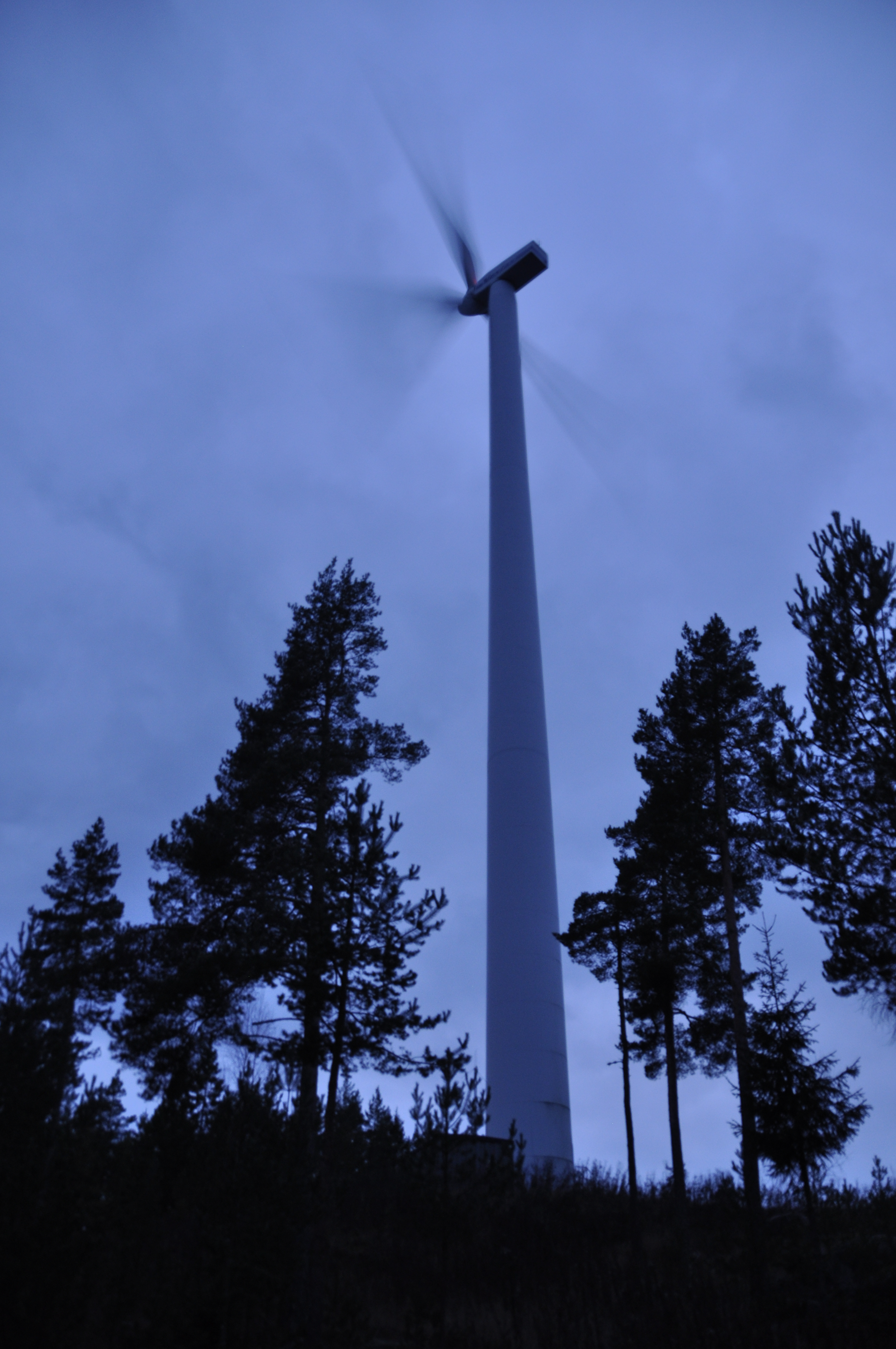
The present wind turbine on the island Ljusterö in 2014

Ljusterö is the site of a proposed project to install a large number of wind turbines to generate renewable energy. The project proposes 23 turbines, each with two megawatts electrical power output. Two wind turbines, one 0.8 MW was built in 2006 and one additional with 2 MW has been approved and was installed during 2009, but the other turbines have not yet been approved by the Österåker Municipality. The project has been heavily criticised by a large number of summer residents as well as permanent residents for affecting the archipelago's environment and views too much, making the island "look like an industrial power plant". Several other negative effects has been stated, such as generation of low frequency noise, drop of real estate values etc.

== Photo gallery ==
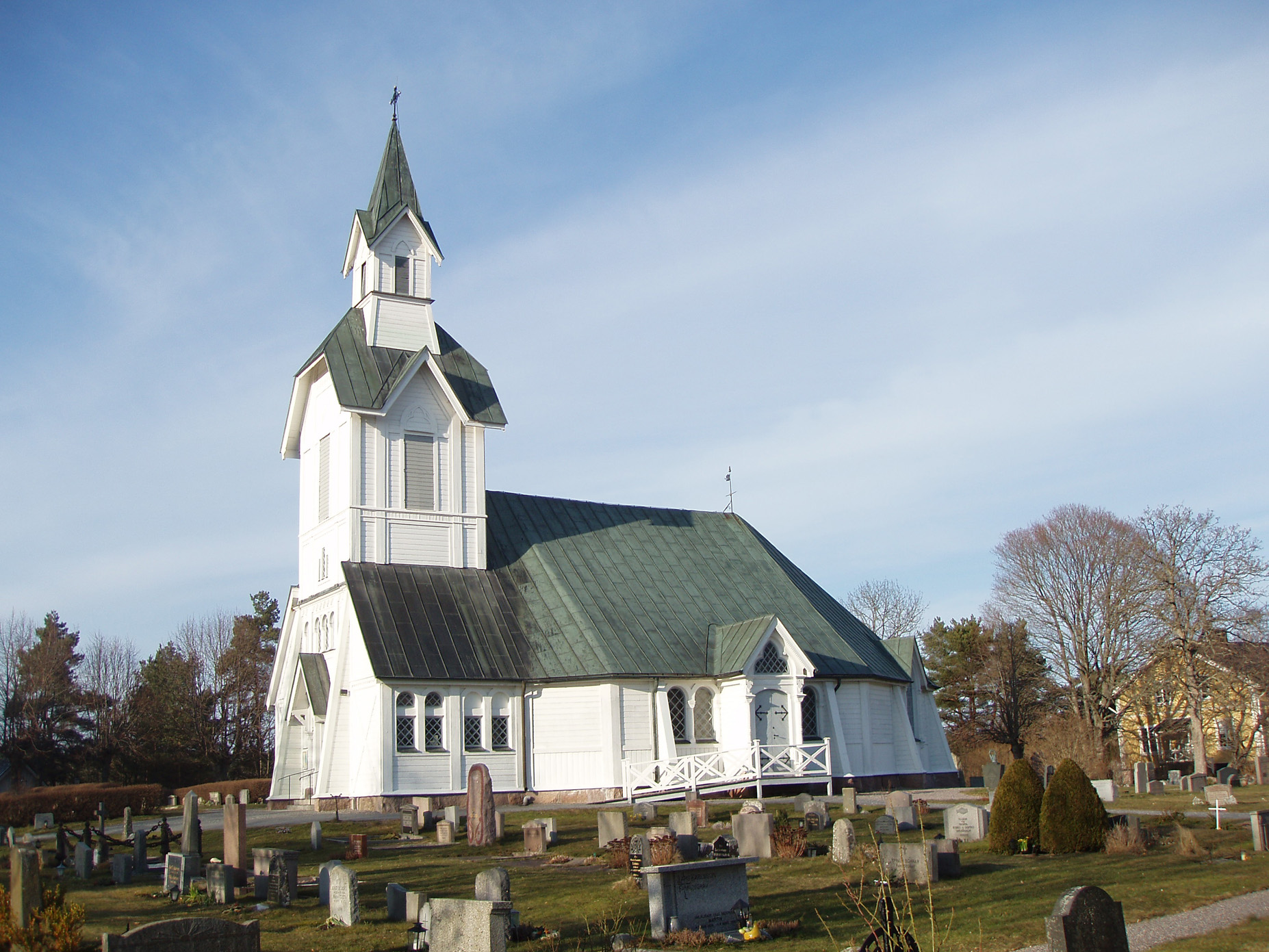
Ljusterö Church. Photo: March 2008.

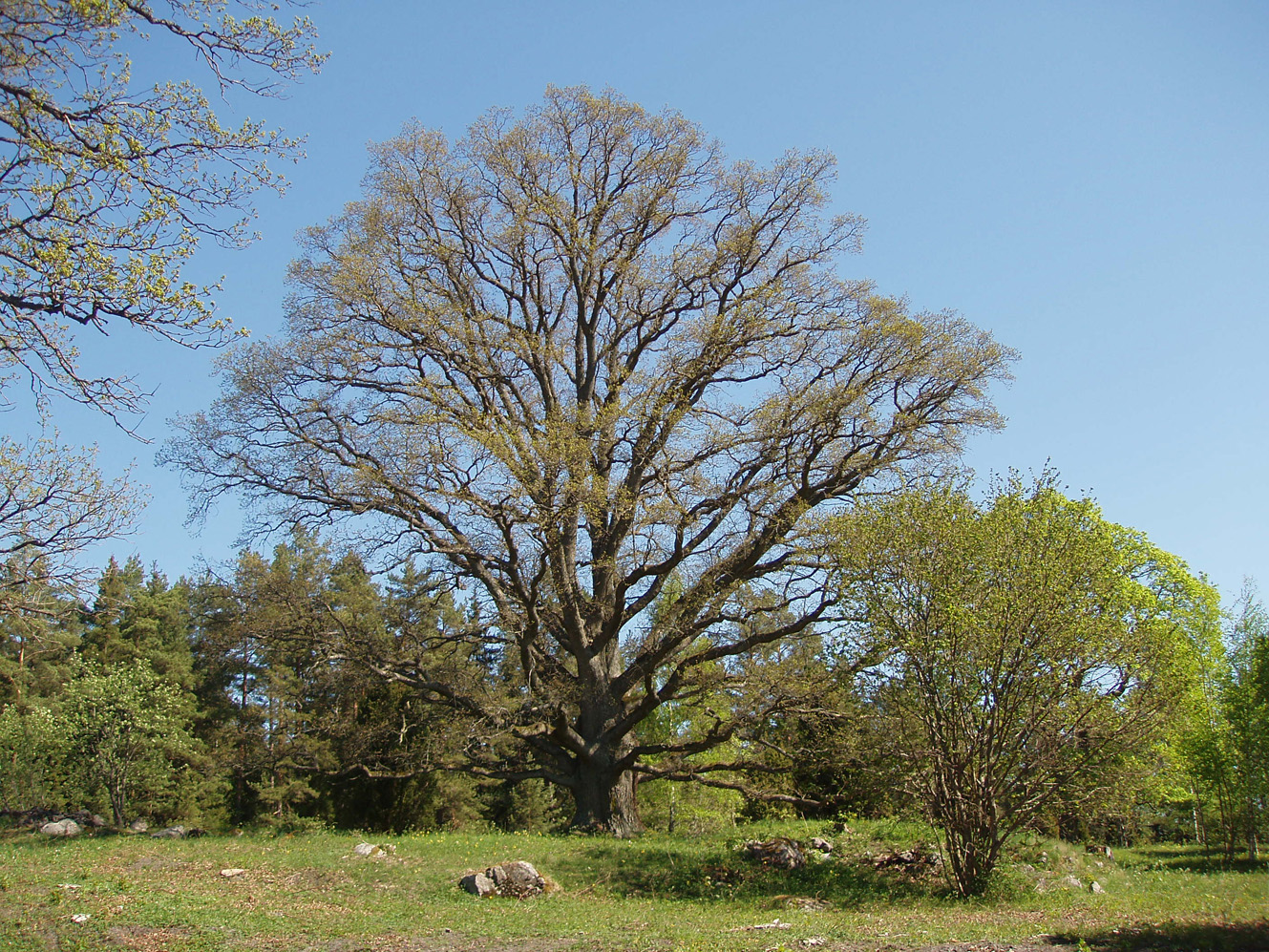
Old oak at Bössarviken, North Ljusterö. Photo: May 2008.

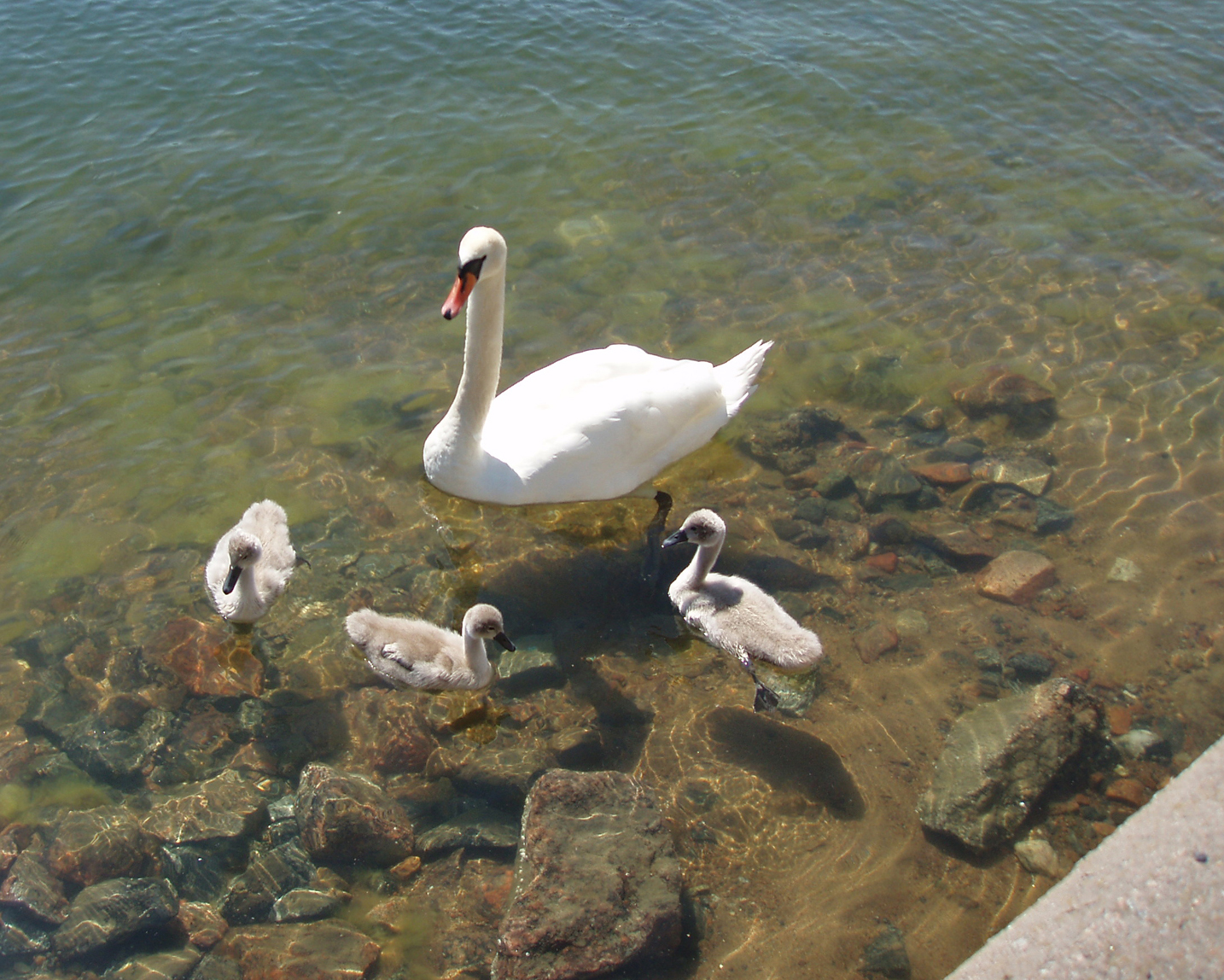
Mute swan with cygnets. South edge of Ljusterö. Photo: July 2008.

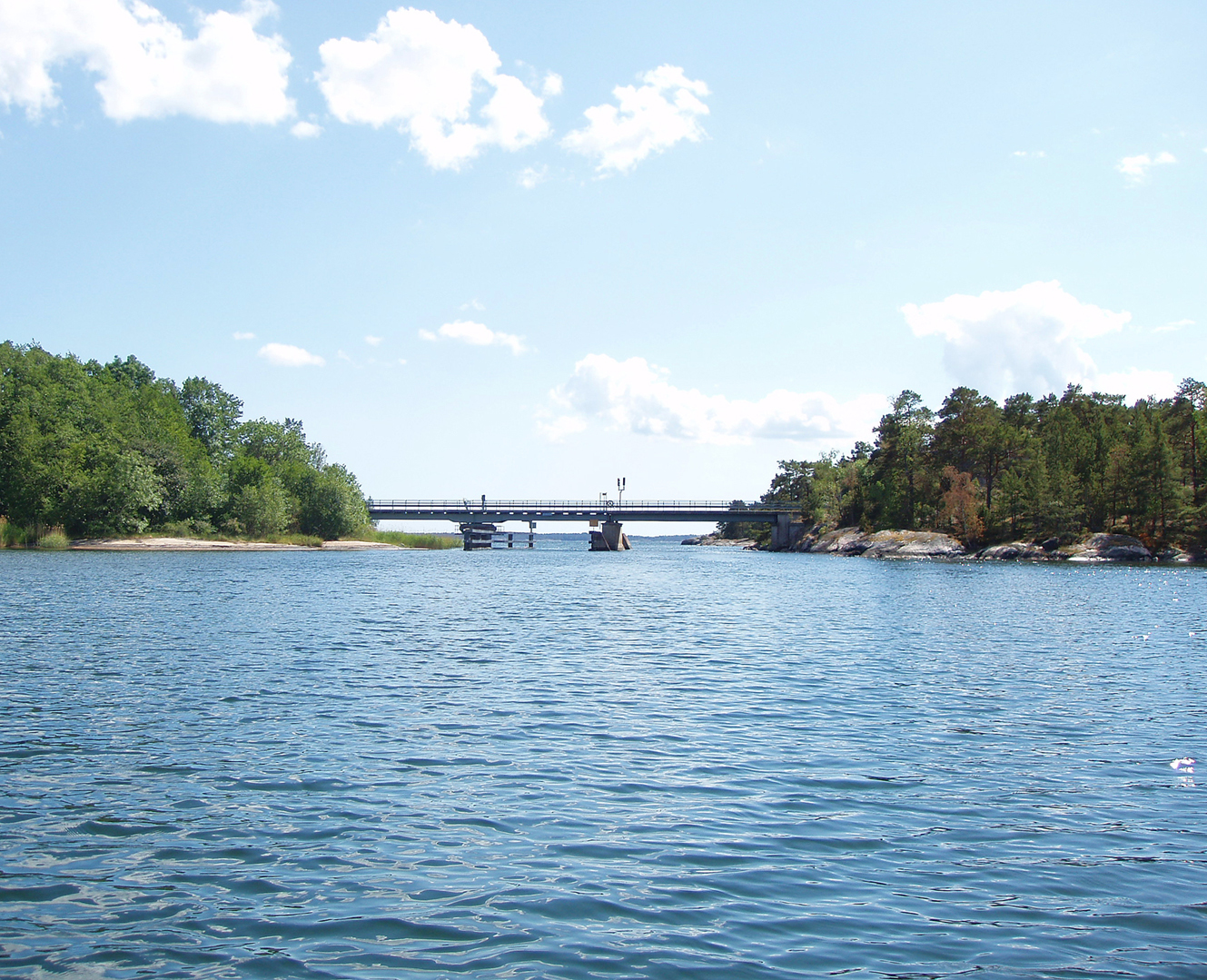
Klintsundet, "the door to the outer archipelago" and the bridge that spans between the western and eastern Lagnö. Photo: June 2008.

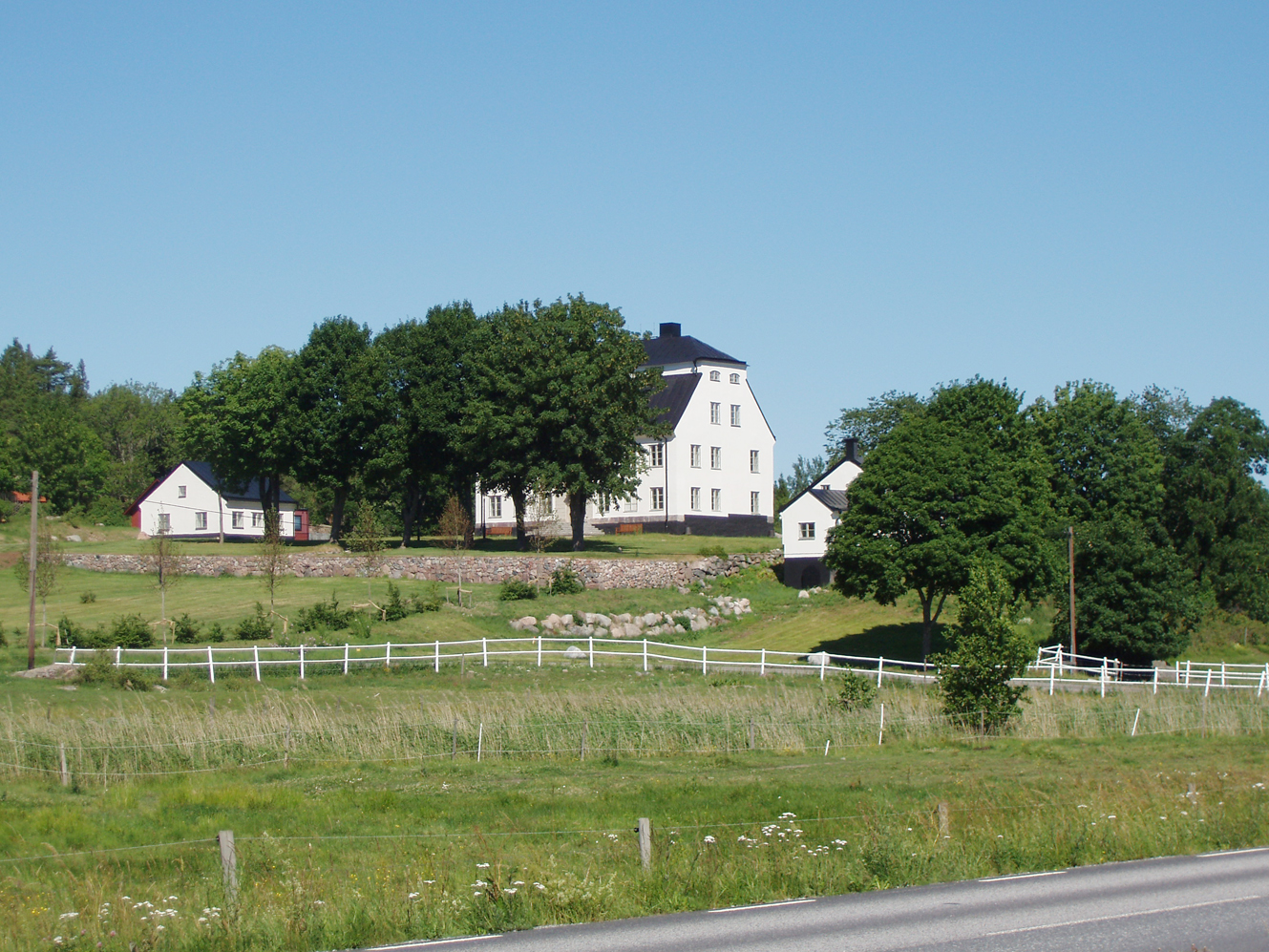
Marum's farm. Photo: July 2008.

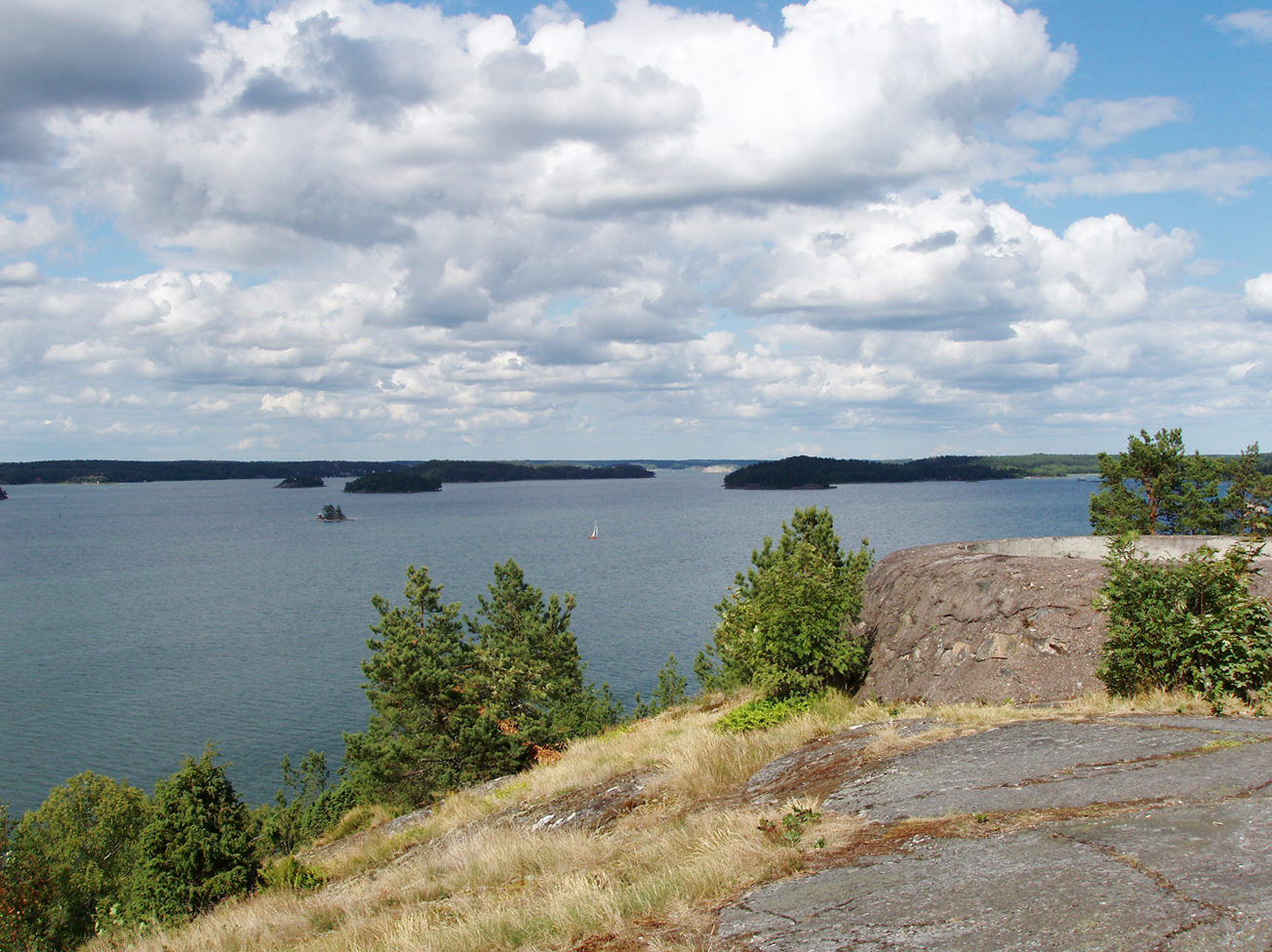
View from Ljusterö huvud, Furusundsleden to the north. Photo: July 2008.

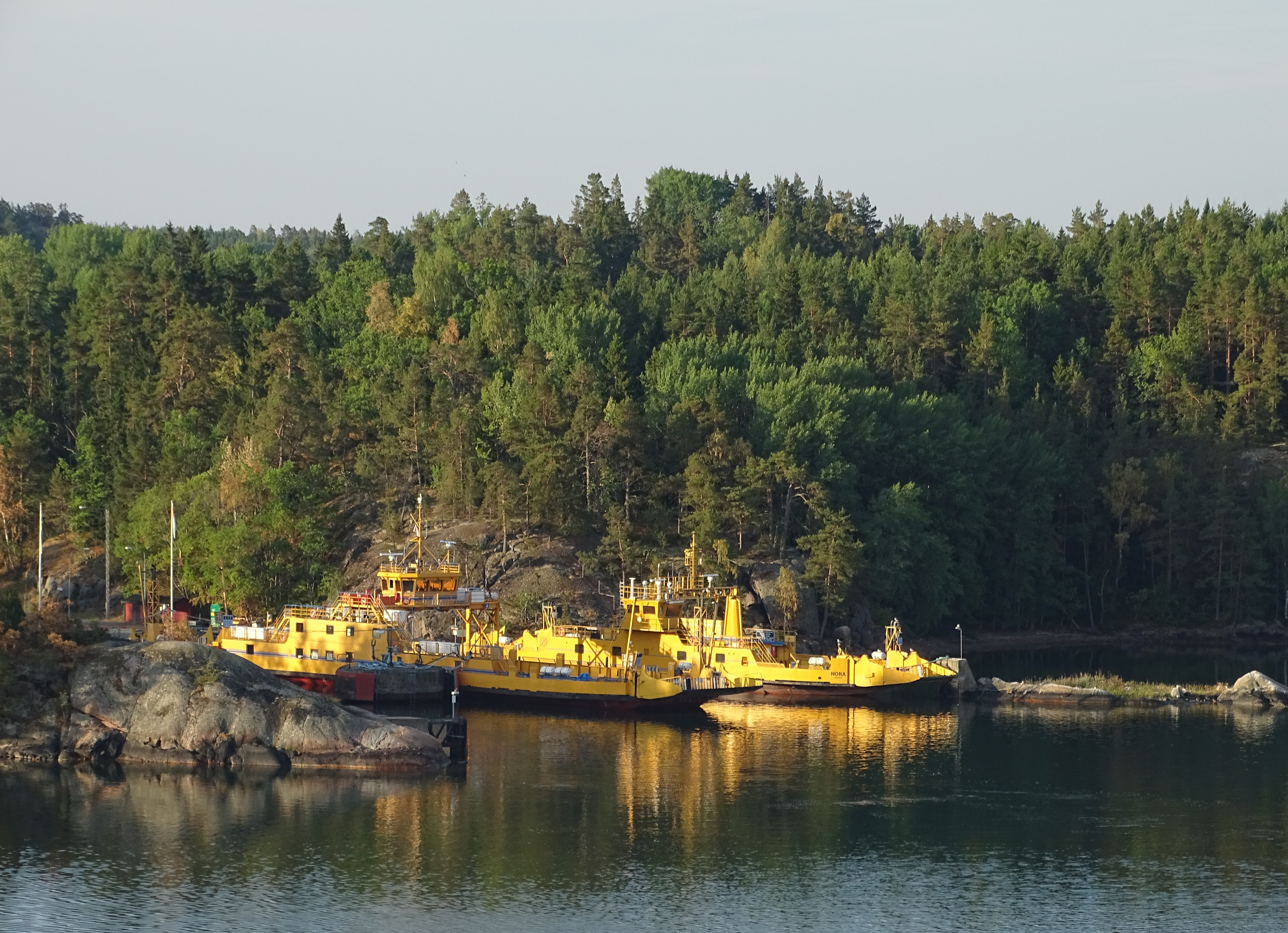
Ferry Ljusterö-Östanå
