= Brevik, Sweden =

Brevik
- Location within Stockholm Location within Sweden Location within European Union
- Coordinates: 59°21′N 18°12′E
- Country: Sweden
- Province: Uppland
- County: Stockholm County
- Municipality: Lidingö Municipality

Area
  - Total: 3.97 km^{2} (1.53 sq mi)

Population (31 December 2010)
  - Total: 8,772
  - Density: 2,211/km^{2} (5,730/sq mi)
- Time zone: UTC+1 (CET)
  - Summer (DST): UTC+2 (CEST)

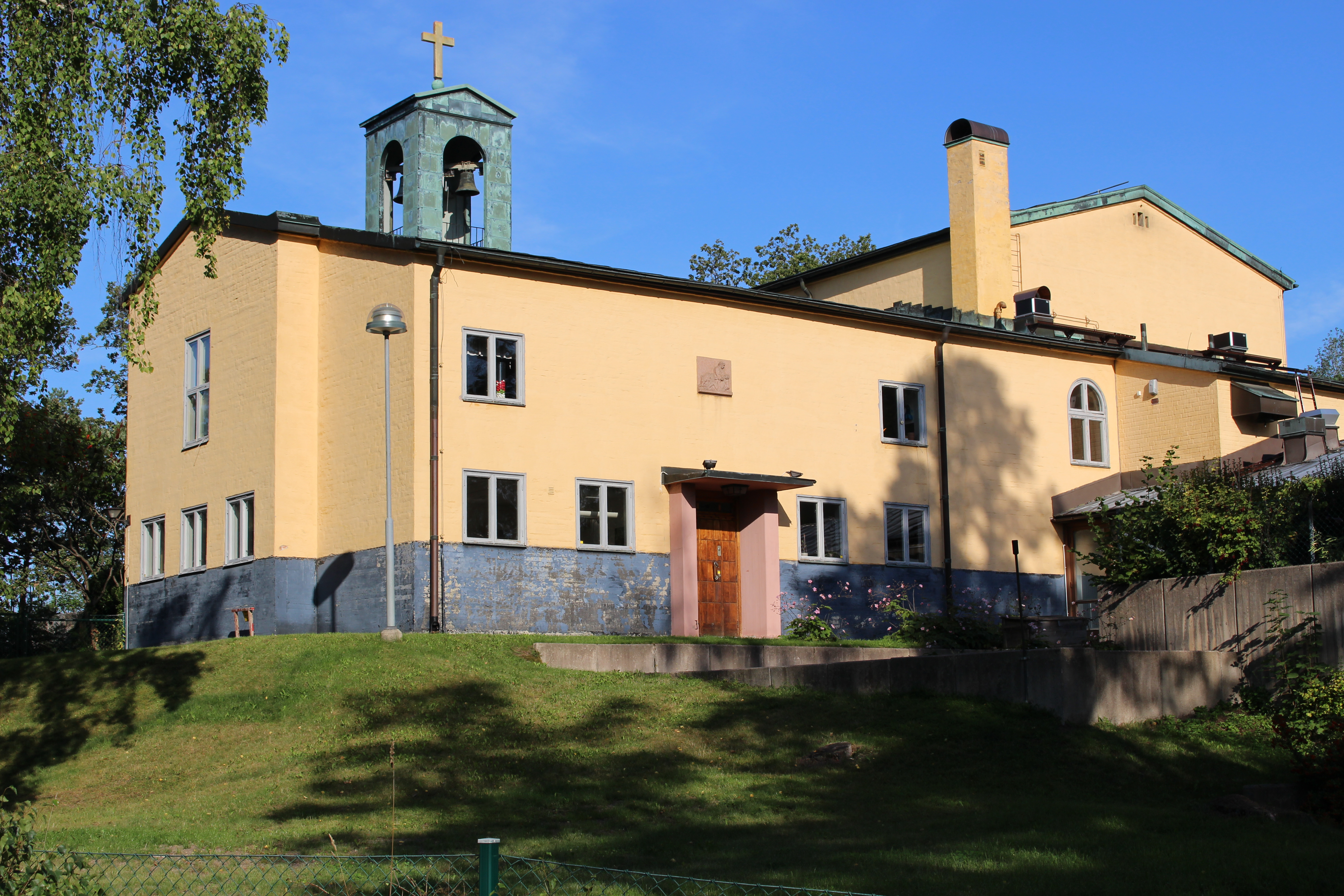
Brevik Church and parish hall

Brevik is a locality situated in Lidingö Municipality, Stockholm County, Sweden with 8,772 inhabitants in 2010.
