= Waxholmsbolaget =

Company responsible for the seaborne public transport in the Stockholm area

- Company type: Joint-stock company
- Industry: Maritime transport
- Founded: 1849; 177 years ago
- Headquarters: Stockholm, Sweden
- Area served: Stockholm Archipelago
- Services: Public transport
- Owner: Stockholm County Council
- Website: waxholmsbolaget.se

Waxholms Ångfartygs AB, commonly referred to as Waxholmsbolaget, is a shipping company owned by Stockholm county council and is responsible for the seaborne public transport in the Stockholm archipelago and Stockholm harbour. The company, which is mostly tax-funded, carried about 4.3 million travellers in 2003, covering a region from Arholma in north of the archipelago to Landsort in the south.

The company owns 20 archipelago boats, and four boats for the inner-city Djurgården ferry line. The operation of the ships is handled by several contractors, some of whom also operate their own ships on behalf of Waxholmsbolaget.

== History ==
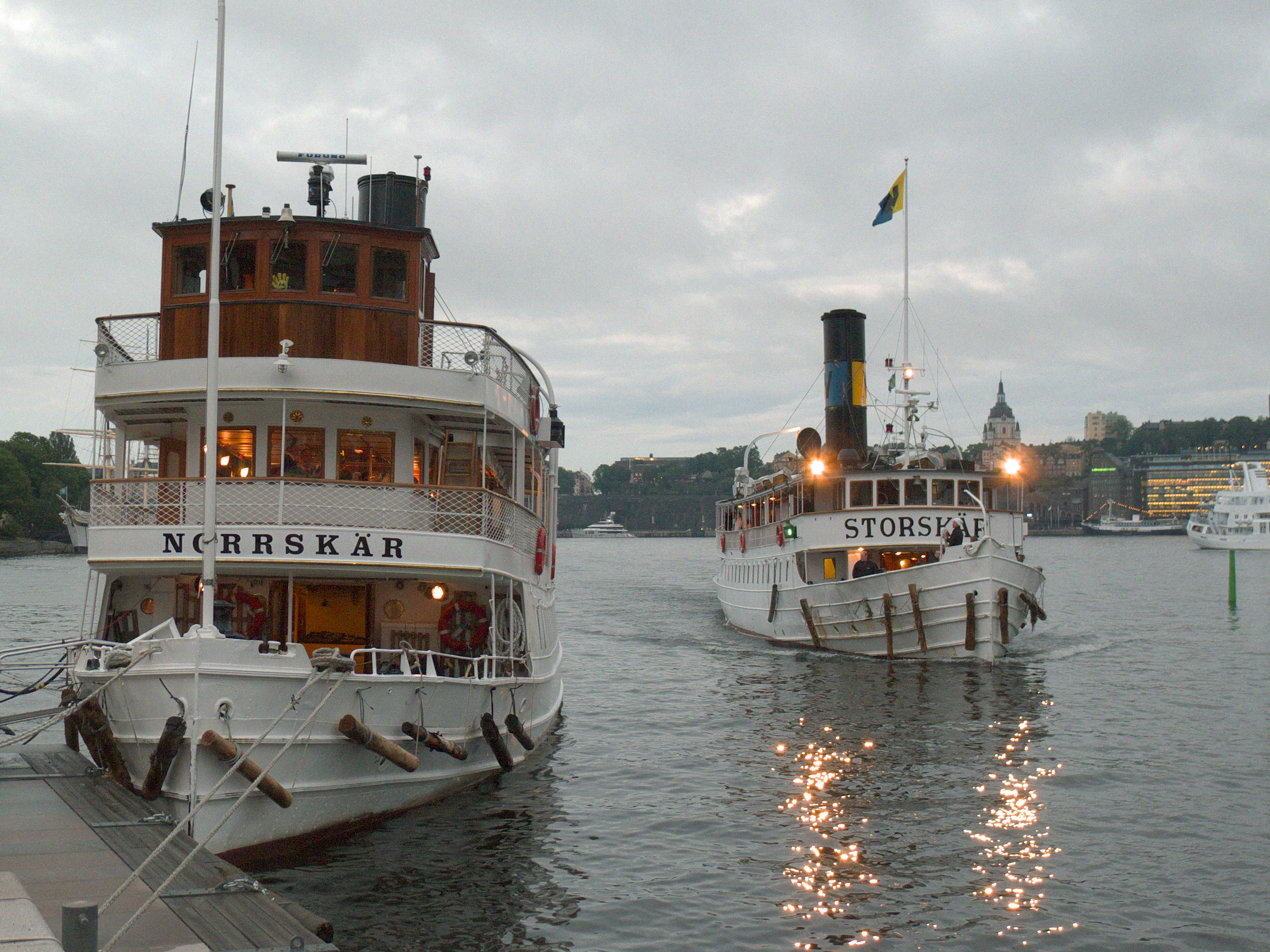
The steamships Norrskär and Storskär date from the beginning of the 20th century and are still used for scheduled traffic in summer

The origins of the company lie in the Djurgårdens Ångbåts-Aktie-Bolag, which was established in 1849. The company operated a steamboat service to the Stockholm archipelago, using the paddle steamers Ran and Aegir on routes from Stockholm to Vaxholm and Dalarö. The new steamboats answered a demand for travel to and from the archipelago, both from affluent Stockholmer’s building summer villas on outlying islands, but also from archipelago residents who travelled into the city to sell fish and vegetables at the market.

In 1869 the company was transformed into the Waxholms Ångfartygs Aktiebolag, which came to be popularly known as the Waxholmsbolaget. Shares were issued in the new company, and a new propeller powered steamboat, the Fredriksborg, was built. In 1881, the Waxholm joined the fleet, establishing the design of what became the typical archipelago steamer. However, in 1898, dissatisfaction with the services provided by the Waxholms Ångfartygs Aktiebolag led to the foundation of a competitor, the Stockholm - Vaxholms Rederi AB. In 1901, the two companies merged to form a new company, the Waxholms Nya Ångfartygs AB, which continued to be popularly known as the Waxholmsbolaget.

In 1913, the Enskilda Bank took over the running of the Waxholmsbolaget, in order to expand operations and offer a better service throughout the archipelago. One of the changes introduced during this period was the company logo, a "W" on a blue and yellow background, designed by Jacob Hägg. In 1946, Rederi Svea became the majority shareholder.

In 1964, the company was renamed as Waxholms Ångfartygs AB, under the ownership of the Vaxholm Municipality. Three years later, in 1967, ownership was transferred to a joint body of the City of Stockholm and County of Stockholm. In 1971, with the incorporation of the city into the county, ownership moved to Stockholm County Council.

In 1970, Waxholmsbolaget took over the services and fleet of the Stockholms Ångslups AB company, which had been founded in 1863. This company operated ferry services within Stockholm city and the inner archipelago, including the Djurgården ferries.

== Current fleet ==
The current fleet owned by the Waxholmsbolaget comprises three classic vessels, nine ice-strengthened ferries, eight fast ferries and four ferries for the urban Djurgården ferry service.

=== Classic ferries ===
Name	Built	Description	Image
Västan	1900	Västan is 32.47 metres (106.5 ft) in length, with a beam of 5.91 metres (19.4 ft), a draught of 2.50 metres (8 ft 2 in), and a capacity of 180 passengers. A Scania diesel engine of 340 horsepower (250 kW) gives a speed of 10.9 knots (20.2 km/h; 12.5 mph). She was built, as the steam ship Nya Svartsjölandet, by Motala Verkstad of Motala, for Nya Svartsjölandet Ångfartygs AB, and initially used on Lake Mälaren. Acquired and renamed by Waxholmolaget in 1937, she was rebuilt and converted to diesel propulsion in 1953, and has been rebuilt and repowered several times since.	
Storskär	1908	Storskär is 38.95 metres (127.8 ft) in length, with a beam of 6.99 metres (22.9 ft), a draught of 2.75 metres (9 ft 0 in), and a capacity of 330 passengers. A steam engine of 659 horsepower (491 kW) gives a speed of 13 knots (24 km/h; 15 mph). She was built, as the Strängnäs Express, by Lindholm Shipyard of Gothenburg, for Strengnäs Nya Rederi AB, and initially used on Lake Mälaren. Acquired by Waxholmolaget in 1939, she still uses her original steam engine with a boiler installed in 1999.	
Norrskär	1910	Norrskär is 34.84 metres (114.3 ft) in length, with a beam of 6.88 metres (22.6 ft), a draught of 3.05 metres (10.0 ft), and a capacity of 265 passengers. A steam engine of 409 horsepower (305 kW) gives a speed of 11 knots (20 km/h; 13 mph). She was built, as the Sandhamns Express, by Eriksbergs Shipyard of Gothenburg, for Oscar Seippel, and has operated services in the Stockholm archipelago since she was built. Acquired by Waxholmolaget in 1947, she acquired her current name in 1949. She still uses her original steam engine with a boiler installed in 2000.	

=== Ice-strengthened ferries ===
Name	Built	Description	Image
Solöga	1978	Solöga is the first of two sister ships to be built, followed by Vindöga. She was built by the local Götaverken Finnboda Shipyard. She is 27.53 metres (90.3 ft) in length, with a beam of 7.2 metres (24 ft), a draught of 3.25 metres (10.7 ft), and a capacity of 180 passengers. A Scania diesel engine of 650 horsepower (480 kW) gives a speed of 11 knots (20 km/h; 13 mph). She was remodelled and a new engine fitted in 2000.	
Vindöga	1978	Vindöga is a sister ship to Solöga. She was built by the local Götaverken Finnboda Shipyard. She is 27.53 metres (90.3 ft) in length, with a beam of 7.2 metres (24 ft), a draught of 3.25 metres (10.7 ft), and a capacity of 180 passengers. A Scania diesel engine of 650 horsepower (480 kW) gives a speed of 11 knots (20 km/h; 13 mph). She was remodelled and a new engine fitted in 2000.	
Waxholm I	1983	Waxholm I is the first of two sister ships to be built, followed by Waxholm II. She was built by the Lunde Shipyard at Ramvik. She is 36.31 metres (119.1 ft) in length, with a beam of 9.02 metres (29.6 ft), a draught of 3 metres (9.8 ft), and a capacity of 344 passengers. Two Volvo diesel engines with a combined power of 1,200 horsepower (890 kW) give a speed of 13 knots (24 km/h; 15 mph). She was remodelled in 1984, 1993, 2006 and 2015, and was re-engined in 1987, 2000 and 2009.	
Waxholm II	1983	Waxholm II is a sister ship to Waxholm I. She was built by the Lunde Shipyard at Ramvik. She is 36 metres (118 ft) in length, with a beam of 9.02 metres (29.6 ft), a draught of 2.95 metres (9 ft 8 in), and a capacity of 350 passengers. Two Volvo diesel engines with a combined power of 1,200 horsepower (890 kW) give a speed of 13 knots (24 km/h; 15 mph). She was remodelled in 1984 and 2007, and was re-engined in 1987, 2001 and 2007.	
Söderarm	2004	Söderarm is the first of three sister ships to be built, followed by Sandhamn and Dalarö. She was built by the Riga Shipyard at Riga in Latvia, with equipment by Moen Slip at Kolvereid in Norway. She is 39.9 metres (131 ft) in length, with a beam of 10.3 metres (34 ft), a draught of 2.85 metres (9 ft 4 in), and a capacity of 500 passengers. Two Mitsubishi diesel engines with a combined power of 1,755 horsepower (1,309 kW) give a speed of 12.7 knots (23.5 km/h; 14.6 mph). She was re-engined in 2016.	
Sandhamn	2004	Sandhamn is a sister ship to Söderarm and Dalarö. She was built by Moen Slip at Kolvereid in Norway. She is 39.9 metres (131 ft) in length, with a beam of 10.3 metres (34 ft), a draught of 2.85 metres (9 ft 4 in), and a capacity of 500 passengers. Four Scania diesel engines with a combined power of 1,800 horsepower (1,300 kW) give a speed of 13.4 knots (24.8 km/h; 15.4 mph). She was re-engined in 2016.	
Dalarö	2005	Dalarö is a sister ship to Söderarm and Dalarö. She was built by the Riga Shipyard at Riga in Latvia, with equipment by Moen Slip at Kolvereid in Norway. She is 39.9 metres (131 ft) in length, with a beam of 10.3 metres (34 ft), a draught of 2.85 metres (9 ft 4 in), and a capacity of 500 passengers. Four Volvo diesel engines with a combined power of 1,800 horsepower (1,300 kW) give a speed of 12 knots (22 km/h; 14 mph).	
Nämdö	2009	Nämdö is the first of two sister ships to be built, followed by Gällnö. She was built by Uki Workboat at Uusikaupunki in Finland. She is 31.3 metres (103 ft) in length, with a beam of 8.72 metres (28.6 ft), a draught of 2.7 metres (8 ft 10 in), and a capacity of 280 passengers. Four Volvo diesel engines with a combined power of 1,175 horsepower (876 kW) give a speed of 12 knots (22 km/h; 14 mph).	
Gällnö	2010	Gällnö is a sister ship to Nämdö. She was built by Uki Workboat at Uusikaupunki in Finland. She is 31.3 metres (103 ft) in length, with a beam of 8.72 metres (28.6 ft), a draught of 2.7 metres (8 ft 10 in), and a capacity of 280 passengers. Four Volvo diesel engines with a combined power of 1,175 horsepower (876 kW) give a speed of 12 knots (22 km/h; 14 mph).	
Yxlan	2018	Yxlan is 27 metres (89 ft) in length, with a beam of 7.5 metres (25 ft), and a capacity of 150 passengers. Two Scania diesel engines with a combined power of 810 kilowatts (1,090 hp) give a speed of 12.5 knots (23.2 km/h; 14.4 mph).	

=== Fast ferries ===
Name	Built	Description	Image
Skärgården	1978	Skärgården is the first of two sister ships to be built, followed by Roslagen. She was built by Marinteknik Verkstads AB at Öregrund. She is 35.06 metres (115.0 ft) in length, with a beam of 7.42 metres (24.3 ft), a draught of 1.4 metres (4 ft 7 in), and a capacity of 297 passengers. Four MTU diesel engines, with a combined output of 1,600 horsepower (1,200 kW) give a speed of 20 knots (37 km/h; 23 mph). After an inspection in 1996 resulted in the imposition of a maximum speed of 12 knots (22 km/h; 14 mph), she was remodelled the following year and had sponsons added to improve stability. Further remodellings followed in 2003 and 2013, and new engines were fitted in 1988, 2001 and 2013.	
Roslagen	1979	Roslagen is a sister ship to Skärgården. She was built by Marinteknik Verkstads AB at Öregrund. She is 35.06 metres (115.0 ft) in length, with a beam of 7.42 metres (24.3 ft), a draught of 1.4 metres (4 ft 7 in), and a capacity of 297 passengers. Four Volvo diesel engines, with a combined output of 1,200 horsepower (890 kW) give a speed of 18 knots (33 km/h; 21 mph). After the inspection of Skärgården in 1996 resulted in the imposition of a maximum speed, the Roslagen was remodelled the following year and had sponsons added to improve stability. Further remodellings followed in 2004 and 2015, and new engines were fitted in 1987 and 2004.	
Värmdö	1990	Värmdö is the first of five sister ships to be built, the so-called V-båtarna as all have names beginning with V. She was built by Oskarshamn Shipyard at Oskarshamn. She is 37.7 metres (124 ft) in length, with a beam of 7.5 metres (25 ft), a draught of 1.7 metres (5 ft 7 in), and a capacity of 340 passengers. Three MTU diesel engines, with a combined output of 2,448 horsepower (1,825 kW) give a speed of 22.5 knots (41.7 km/h; 25.9 mph). As built, the engines exhausted at the waterline, but after a years service she was remodelled to exhaust through funnels. She was further remodelled in 2010 and 2011, and new engines were fitted in 2001 and 2010.	
Vånö	1991	Vånö is the second of five sister ships to be built, the so-called V-båtarna as all have names beginning with V. She was built by Oskarshamn Shipyard at Oskarshamn. She is 37.7 metres (124 ft) in length, with a beam of 7.5 metres (25 ft), a draught of 1.7 metres (5 ft 7 in), and a capacity of 340 passengers. Three MTU diesel engines, with a combined output of 2,448 horsepower (1,825 kW) give a speed of 22 knots (41 km/h; 25 mph). She was remodelled in 2011, and new engines were fitted in 2002 and 2011.	
Väddö	1992	Väddö is the third of five sister ships to be built, the so-called V-båtarna as all have names beginning with V. She was built by Oskarshamn Shipyard at Oskarshamn. She is 37.7 metres (124 ft) in length, with a beam of 7.5 metres (25 ft), a draught of 1.7 metres (5 ft 7 in), and a capacity of 340 passengers. Three MTU diesel engines, with a combined output of 2,448 horsepower (1,825 kW) give a speed of 22 knots (41 km/h; 25 mph). She was remodelled in 2012, and new engines were fitted in 2003 and 2012.	
Viberö	1993	Viberö is the fourth of five sister ships to be built, the so-called V-båtarna as all have names beginning with V. She was built by Oskarshamn Shipyard at Oskarshamn. She is 37.7 metres (124 ft) in length, with a beam of 7.5 metres (25 ft), a draught of 1.7 metres (5 ft 7 in), and a capacity of 340 passengers. Three MTU diesel engines, with a combined output of 2,448 horsepower (1,825 kW) give a speed of 22 knots (41 km/h; 25 mph). She was remodelled in 2012, and new engines were fitted in 2003 and 2012.	
Vaxö	1993	Vaxö is the last of five sister ships to be built, the so-called V-båtarna as all have names beginning with V. She was built by Oskarshamn Shipyard at Oskarshamn. She is 37.7 metres (124 ft) in length, with a beam of 7.5 metres (25 ft), a draught of 1.7 metres (5 ft 7 in), and a capacity of 340 passengers. Three MTU diesel engines, with a combined output of 2,448 horsepower (1,825 kW) give a speed of 22 knots (41 km/h; 25 mph). New engines were fitted in 2000 and 2009.	
Saxaren	1999	Saxaren is a later half-sister to the five V-båtarna. She was built by Båtservice Holding A/S at Mandal in Norway. She is 37.39 metres (122.7 ft) in length, with a beam of 7.5 metres (25 ft), a draught of 1.41 metres (4 ft 8 in), and a capacity of 340 passengers. Two MTU diesel engines, with a combined output of 1,632 horsepower (1,217 kW) give a speed of 20.5 knots (38.0 km/h; 23.6 mph). She was remodelled and new engines were fitted in 2014.	

=== Djurgården ferries ===
See article Djurgården ferry

== Notable past fleet ==
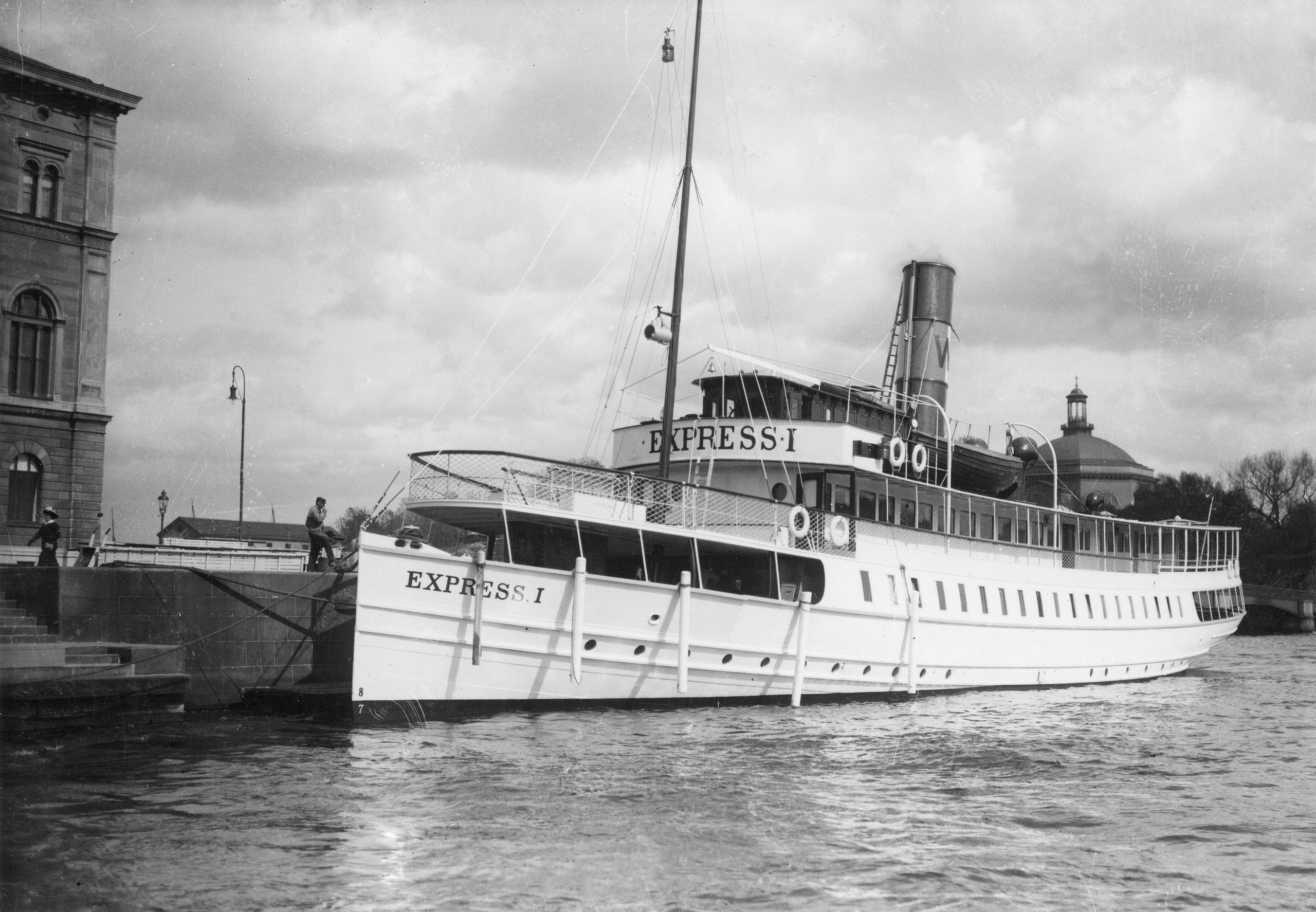
The Express I, in May 1913

The following notable vessels were formerly part of the Waxholmsbolaget fleet:

- Angantyr (between 1968 and 1978)
- Express I (as the Express, between 1900 and 1913; as the Express I, between 1913 and 1960)
- Fredriksborg (between 1869 and 1882; now the Katarina)
- Östanå I (between 1913 and 1957)
- Östanå II (between 1913 and 1951)
- Saxaren (between 1929 and 1964; now the Gustafsberg VII)
- Valkyrian (between 1918 and 1964, now the Drottningholm)
- Waxholm (between 1881 and 1956)
- Waxholm (as the Express II, between 1913 and 1964; as the Waxholm, between 1964 and 1978)
