= SS Waxholm (1909) =

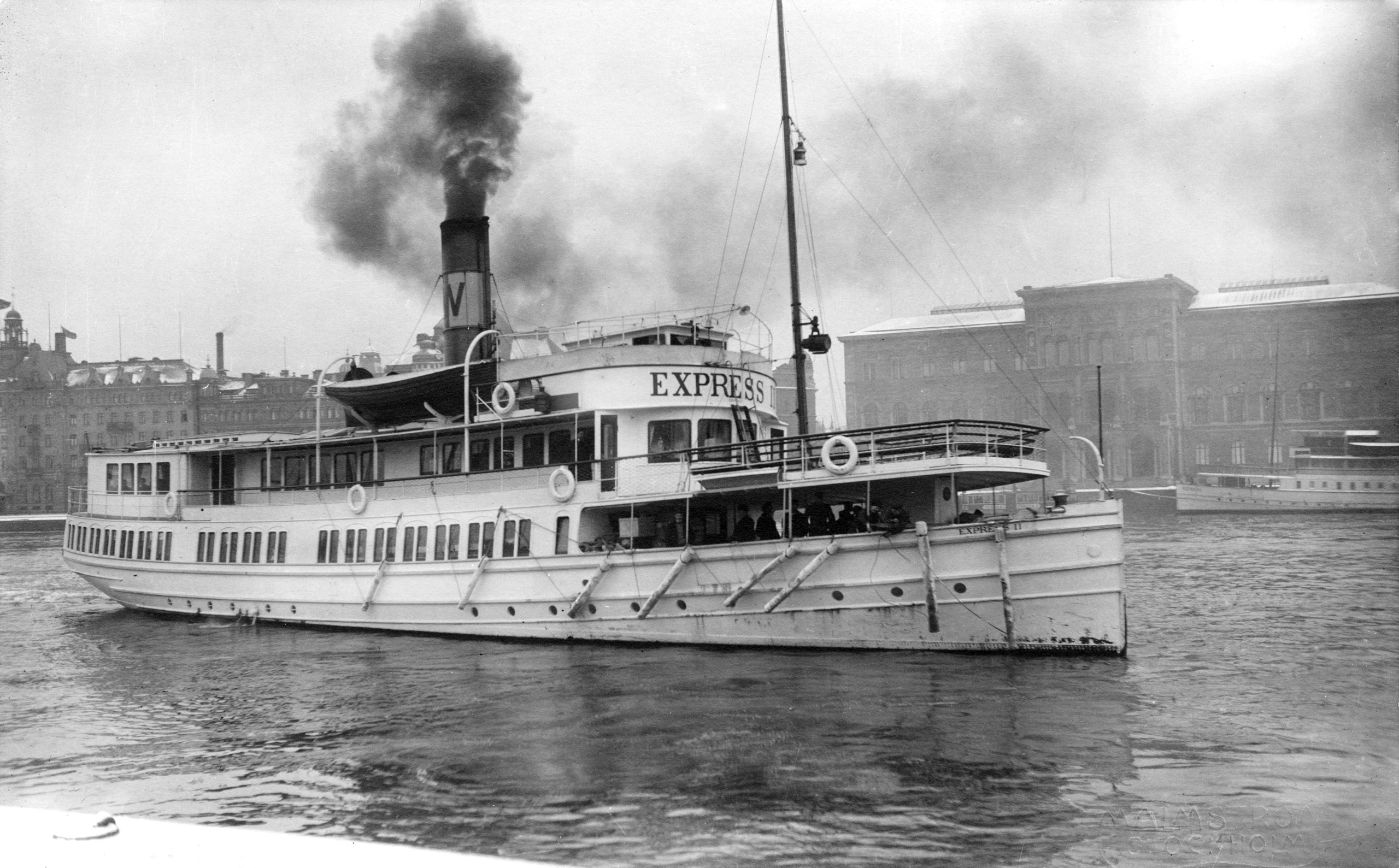
- The Express II in Stockholm prior to being renamed Waxholm in 1964

History
- Name: Brevik (1909-1913); Express II (1913-1964); Waxholm (1964-1978)
- Owner: Fastighets AB Lidingö-Brevik (1909-1911); Ångfartygs AB Lidingö-Brevik (1911-1913); Waxholmsbolaget (1913-1978)
- Builder: Eriksbergs Mekaniska Verkstad, Gothenburg, Sweden
- Identification: IMO number: 5111127
- Fate: Scrapped in 1983

General characteristics
- Type: Steam passenger ferry
- Length: 38.99 m (127 ft 11 in)
- Beam: 7.73 m (25 ft 4 in)
- Draught: 3.0 m (9 ft 10 in)
- Speed: 14 knots (26 km/h; 16 mph)
- Capacity: 450 passengers

The Waxholm was a steam ship that was built, as the Brevik, in 1909. She was intended for use on local services between Stockholm and the newly built residential area in Brevik on the island of Lidingö. Proven uneconomic on that relatively short service, she was acquired by the Waxholmsbolaget in 1913, renamed Express II and remodelled for use on that company's archipelago services. In 1964 she was renamed Waxholm, but in 1978 she was badly damaged in a fire. Never repaired, she was scrapped in 1983.

== History ==
The Brevik was built in 1909 by the Eriksbergs Mekaniska Verkstad in Gothenburg, Sweden. She was delivered on 13 July 1909 to the Fastighets AB Lidingö-Brevik, a property company responsible for developing the new suburb of Brevik on the island of Lidingö, in order to link that suburb to central Stockholm. In 1911 the Fastighets AB Lidingö-Brevik formed the Ångfartygs AB Lidingö-Brevik shipping company, who took over the Brevik and continued to operate her on the same service.

In 1913, the Brevik was sold to Waxholms Nya Ångfartygs AB, better known as the Waxholmsbolaget, and renamed Express II. She was remodeled for use on that company's archipelago services, and was initially used on the service from Stockholm to Stenslätten via Vaxholm and Ramsö. She remained on this service until 1951, when she moved to the service from Stockholm to Sandhamn.

In 1964, after the 1881-built Waxholm had been scrapped, the Express II was renamed Waxholm. She continued on the Sandhamn service until 12 March 1978, when a fire broke out whilst the ship was moored for the night in Stavsnäs Vinterhamn. The ship was badly damaged and eventually towed back to Beckholmen and then Värtahamnen, before being scrapped in 1983.
