= List of oldest surviving ships =

This is a list of the oldest ships in the world which have survived to this day with exceptions to certain categories. The ships on the main list, which include warships, yachts, tall ships, and vessels recovered during archaeological excavations, all date to between 500 AD and 1918; earlier ships are covered in the list of surviving ancient ships. Vessels listed are sorted by date of launch as most accurately known. Many of the ships in the "Build location" column were built for use in other countries by the United Kingdom, which in the mid to late 1800s was a dominant worldwide ship builder. A majority of ships on this list are found in museums, and it includes examples that are the last of their kind left in the world.

== List criteria ==
While this list includes the "oldest surviving" ships, many have since been restored, and/or reconstructed. Ships that have been exposed to the elements gradually deteriorate over time, thus no ship can be considered truly original due to part replacements during a ship's life. This leads to a known paradox called the "Ship of Theseus", making the definition of "original" unclear. An example is the USS Niagara: the original sank in 1820 and was raised and reconstructed three times. These extensive reconstructions left little of the original ship remaining (nonstructural items). Another separate issue is incomplete ships due to weathering conditions caused by their status as a former shipwreck, or by sheer neglect. One example is the ship Mary Rose, whose raised and preserved remains consist of only a partial hull. Those that remain underwater and intact are lumped into a separate category that focuses on shipwrecks, such as those found in the Black Sea. Many surviving old ships may also appear on other Wikipedia lists such as lightvessels. Many old lightvessels survive worldwide to this day, unlike ocean liners of which there are very few pre-World War II examples.

=== With these things in mind, the following are excluded ===
- Replicas – There is an article on ship replicas.
- Underwater wrecks – There is an index with lists of shipwrecks.
- Ships made after 1918 – This is a list of "oldest" ships launched before 1919.

=== The following things are included in this page ===
- Reconstructed ships – "Restored" is fine as long as the ship retains its original features or some of its original features. (Note: Use your best judgement when including these ships here per "Ship of Theseus". Going by reliable sources indicating that the ship is "surviving" is a good indication of inclusion.)
- Wreckage – As long as they are restored in some way and put on display as a museum exhibit. All of the ships listed below include a fully intact or partially intact hull. Ships like the Lady Elizabeth are still considered to be surviving despite their current condition of not being preserved.

== Legend ==
- These ships have been preserved in museums or
  they are no longer in use but still exist to this day.
- Not a museum ship (commercial vessel, privately
  owned, etcetera)
- N/A indicates that information is unavailable or yet to be evaluated.

== Oldest ships ==
=== 500–1400s AD ===
Name	Image	Year of construction	Type	Build location (Note: Area of origin)	Current location	Overall length
Punjulharjo boat		660–780 AD	Lashed-lug boat	Indonesia (Rembang Regency)	(Punjulharjo Cultural Conservation Site, Rembang Regency)	51 ft (16 m)
Butuan Boat 2	—N/a	689–940 AD	Lashed-lug boat	Philippines (Butuan)	Philippines (National Museum of Anthropology, Manila)	37 ft (11 m)
Butuan Boat 1	—N/a	777–988	Lashed-lug boat	Philippines (Butuan)	Philippines (National Museum of the Philippines, Butuan)	33 ft (10 m)
First Lake Mendota canoe	—N/a	800	Dugout canoe	United States (Lake Mendota)	United States (Unknown)	15 ft (4.6 m)
Oseberg Ship		820	Viking ship	Norway (Vestfold)	Norway (Oslo)	71 ft (22 m)
Gokstad ship		900	Viking ship	Norway (Vestfold)	Norway (Oslo)	76 ft (23 m)
Tune ship		900	Viking ship	Norway (Vestfold)	Norway (Oslo)	61.3 ft (18.7 m) (Note: Estimated length)
Äskekärrskeppet		10th century	Viking ship	—N/a	Sweden (Museum of Gothenburg, Gothenburg)	52.4 ft (16.0 m)
Utrecht ship		997–1030	Cargo vessel	Netherlands (Unknown)	Netherlands (Utrecht)	58.39 ft (17.80 m)
Serçe Limanı Shipwreck (Note: It is popularly called the Glass Wreck because of the large quantities of broken glassware visible during the ships excavation)		11th century	Merchant ship	Byzantine Empire	Turkey (Bodrum)	49.2 ft (15.0 m)
Viksbåten		11th century	Viking ship	Sweden (Unknown)	Sweden (Erikskulle museum)	31.49 ft (9.60 m)
Stanley Ferry logboat		1000	Logboat	England	England (Wakefield)	19 ft (5.8 m)
Roskilde 6		1025	Viking ship	Norway (Oslo)	Denmark (Copenhagen)	122.7 ft (37.4 m)
Skuldelev 1		1030	Viking ship	Norway (Sognefjorden)	Denmark (Roskilde)	51.96 ft (15.84 m)
Skuldelev 5		1030	Viking ship	Denmark (Roskilde)	Denmark (Roskilde)	56.7 ft (17.3 m)
Skuldelev 6		1030	Viking ship	Norway (Sognefjorden)	Denmark (Roskilde)	36.7 ft (11.2 m)
Skuldelev 3		1040	Viking ship	Denmark (Unknown)	Denmark (Roskilde)	45 ft (14 m)
Skuldelev 2		1042	Viking ship	Kingdom of Dublin	Denmark (Roskilde)	98 ft (30 m)
Ląd boat		After 1125	Cargo vessel	Poland (Wrocław)	Poland (Gdańsk)	27.8 ft (8.5 m) (Note: Extant length)
Ellingåskibet		1163	Merchant ship	Denmark (Jutland)	Denmark (Frederikshavn)	47.57 ft (14.50 m)
Quanzhou ship		1272	Junk	China (Unknown)	China (Fujian)	113.5 ft (34.6 m)
Shinan ship		14th century	Trade ship	China (Unknown)	South Korea (Mokpo)	105 ft (32 m)
Bremen cog		1380	Trade ship	Holy Roman Empire (Archbishopric of Bremen)	Germany (Bremerhaven)	79 ft (24 m)
IJssel cog		15th century	Cog	Netherlands (Guelders)	Netherlands (Lelystad)	65 ft (20 m)
Newport Ship		1449	Trade ship	Spain (Basque Country)	United Kingdom (Newport) (Note: Currently Disassembled)	116 ft (35 m)

=== 1500s–1859 ===
Names	Image	Year of construction	Type	Build location	Current location	Overall length
Mary Rose		1511	Carrack	England (Unknown)	United Kingdom (Portsmouth)	—N/a
Riddarholmsskeppet		1517	Sailing warship (Note: Not otherwise defined, it's only known that these ships were used for warfare.)	Sweden (Unknown)	Sweden (Stockholm)	—N/a
Maasilinn Ship		1550	Transport ship	Saaremaa	Estonia (Tallinn)	52 ft (16 m)
Tarihi Kadırga		Late 16th century	Galley	Ottoman Empire	Turkey (Istanbul)	130 ft (39.64 m)
Sparrow Hawk		1626	Pinnace	England (Unknown)	United States (Plymouth) (Note: Currently in storage)	40 ft (12 m)
Vasa		1627	Sailing warship	Swedish Empire (Stockholm)	Sweden (Stockholm)	226 ft (69 m)
Botik of Peter the Great		1640s	Miniature Warship	England or Russia	Russia (Central Naval Museum)	23 ft (7.0 m)
State Barge of Charles II		1670	Shallop	England (Unknown)	United Kingdom (Portsmouth)	35 ft (11 m)
La Belle		1684	Colony Ship	Kingdom of France	United States (Austin)	54.4 ft (16.6 m)
Queen Mary's Shallop		1689	Shallop	United Kingdom (Unknown)	United Kingdom (Greenwich)	41.60 ft (12.69 m)
Fortuna		1689–1692	Boat	Russia (Unknown)	Russia (Pereslavl-Zalessky)	24 ft (7.3 m)
Tsar Peters Båt		1697	Boat	Netherlands (Zaardam)	Sweden (Livrustkammaren)	16.73 ft (5.10 m)
Galeota Grande		1711	Royal barge	Kingdom of Portugal (Ribeira)	Portugal (Lisbon)	81 ft (24 m)
Bucintoro dei Savoia		1729	Royal barge	Republic of Venice	Italy (Venaria Reale)	52 ft (16 m)
Prince Frederick's Barge		1732	Royal barge	Great Britain (South Bank, London)	United Kingdom (Greenwich)	63.34 ft (19.31 m)
Barque		1735–1750	Transport ship	Canada	Canada (Quebec City)	31.00 ft (9.45 m)
Galeota Pequena		1753	Royal barge	Kingdom of Portugal (Unknown)	Portugal (Lisbon)	58 ft (18 m)
HMS Victory		1765	Ship of the line	Great Britain (Chatham, Kent)	United Kingdom (Portsmouth)	228 ft (69 m)
USS Philadelphia		1776	Gunboat	United States (Skenesboro)	United States (Washington, D.C.)	53 ft (16 m)
Bergantim real		1780	Royal barge	Kingdom of Portugal (Lisbon)	Portugal (Lisbon)	96 ft (29 m)
Hvide Chalup		1780	Royal barge	Denmark (Unknown)	Denmark (Copenhagen)	—N/a
Margaret		1780	Sailing yacht	United Kingdom (Whitehaven)	United Kingdom (Windermere)	86.9 ft (26.5 m)
Delfinen		1787	Royal barge	Sweden (Karlskrona)	Sweden (Stockholm)	33 ft (10 m)
Galten		1787	Royal barge	Sweden (Karlskrona)	Sweden (Stockholm)	33 ft (10 m)
HMS Nancy		1789	Schooner	United States (Detroit)	Canada (Wasaga Beach)	80 ft (24 m)
Peggy		1789	Armed yacht	Isle of Man (Castletown)	Isle of Man (Castletown)	27 ft (8.2 m)
Saveira Dourada		1790	Royal barge	Kingdom of Portugal (Unknown)	Portugal (Lisbon)	43 ft (13 m)
USS Constitution		1797	Frigate	United States (Boston)	United States (Boston)	203.3 ft (62.0 m)
Galeota da Alfândega		Late 18th century	State barge	Kingdom of Portugal (Unknown)	Portugal (Lisbon)	38 ft (12 m)
Nordic Spirit		19th century	Fishing boat (now replica Viking ship)	Norway (Unknown)	United States (Seattle)	—N/a
Zetland		1802	Lifeboat	United Kingdom (South Shields)	United Kingdom (Redcar)	29.97 ft (9.13 m)
Galeota Real		1808	Royal barge	Kingdom of Portugal (Salvador)	Brazil (Rio de Janeiro)	78 ft (24 m)
Canot impérial de Napoléon		1810	Royal barge	French Empire (TBD)	France (Paris)	59 ft (18 m)
USS Ticonderoga		1812–1814	Schooner	United States (Adam and Noah Brown)	United States (Whitehall, NY)	120 ft (37 m)
Koningssloep		1816–1818	Royal barge	Netherlands (Unknown)	Netherlands (Amsterdam)	55 ft (17 m)
HMS Trincomalee		1817	Frigate	Company Raj (Bombay)	United Kingdom (Hartlepool)	150.45 ft (45.86 m)
Lady Guilford		1819	Sailing galley	United Kingdom (Unknown)	United Kingdom (Irvine)	—N/a
HMS Unicorn		1824	Frigate	United Kingdom (Chatham, Kent)	United Kingdom (Dundee)	151.9 ft (46.3 m)
Waka Taua		Before 1827	Waka	New Zealand (Bay of Plenty)	United Kingdom (Edinburgh)	19 ft (5.8 m)
Oxford 1829 Boat	—N/a	1828	Racing yacht	United Kingdom (Oxford)	United Kingdom (Henley-on-Thames)	46.89 ft (14.29 m)
Prince Miguel's barge		1831	Royal barge	Kingdom of Portugal (Oporto)	Portugal (Lisbon)	47 ft (14 m)
Tyne		1833	Lifeboat	United Kingdom (South Shields)	United Kingdom (South Shields)	—N/a
LV16 Inner Dowsing	—N/a	1840	Lightvessel	United Kingdom (Northfleet)	United Kingdom (Rochester)	87.44 ft (26.67 m)
Charles W. Morgan		1841	Whaler	United States (New Bedford)	United States (Mystic)	113 ft (34 m)
Dom Fernando II e Glória		1843	Frigate	Portuguese India (Daman)	Portugal (Almada)	284 ft (87 m)
Bertha		1844	Dredge	United Kingdom (Bristol)	United Kingdom (Store)	50 ft (15 m)
Great Britain		1845	Ocean liner	United Kingdom (Bristol)	United Kingdom (Bristol)	322 ft (98 m)
Brandtaucher		1850	Submarine	German Confederation (Kiel)	Germany (Dresden)	27 ft (8.2 m)
Dolly		1850	Launch	United Kingdom (Unknown)	United Kingdom (Windermere)	40.98 ft (12.50 m)
Gondola		1850	Gondola	Italy (Venice)	United States (Las Vegas)	36 ft (11 m)
Snow Squall	—N/a	1851	Clipper	United States (Cape Elizabeth)	United States (Bath)	157 ft (48 m) (Note: 36-foot bow section is preserved)
Edwin Fox		1853	Australian convict ship	Company Raj (Calcutta)	New Zealand (Picton)	157 ft (48 m)
Maria		1853	Narrowboat	United Kingdom (Cheshire)	United Kingdom (Manchester)	70.00 ft (21.34 m)
Anna af Sand	—N/a	1854	Hardangerjakt	Norway (Hardanger)	Norway (Stavanger)	51.8 ft (15.8 m)
USS Constellation		1854	Sloop-of-war	United States (Portsmouth)	United States (Baltimore)	199 ft (61 m)
Francis Metallic Surfboat		1854	Boat	United States (Long Branch)	United States (Douglas)	26 ft (7.9 m)
Tudor Vladimirescu		1854	Paddle steamer	Austrian Empire (Budapest)	Romania (Galați)	195.0 ft (59.44 m)
Victoria	—N/a	1855	Racing yacht	United Kingdom (Newcastle upon Tyne)	United Kingdom (Henley-on-Thames)	39.34 ft (11.99 m)
Santiago		1856	Barque	United Kingdom (Methil)	Australia (Garden Island)	160 ft 7 in (48.95 m)
Skibladner		1856	Paddle steamer	Sweden–Norway (Motala)	Norway (Gjøvik)	164 ft (50 m)
Gondola		1859	Steam yacht	United Kingdom (Liverpool)	United Kingdom (Coniston Water)	86 ft (26 m)

=== 1860–1889 ===
Names	Image	Year of construction	Type	Build location	Current location	Overall length
Rifle		1860s	Steamship	United Kingdom (Unknown)	United Kingdom (Irvine)	—N/a
Jylland		1860	Steam frigate	Denmark (Copenhagen)	Denmark (Ebeltoft)	233 ft (71 m)
Mossdale		1860	Mersey flat	United Kingdom (Chester)	United Kingdom (Ellesmere Port)	71.97 ft (21.94 m)
Warrior		1860	Ironclad	United Kingdom (London)	United Kingdom (Portsmouth)	420 ft (130 m)
Cairo		1861	Ironclad	United States (Mound City)	United States (Vicksburg)	175 ft (53 m)
Hjejlen		1861	Paddle steamer	Denmark (B&W Copenhagen)	Denmark (Ry)	26.9 m (88 ft)
Mayflower		1861	Tugboat	United Kingdom (Bristol)	United Kingdom (Bristol)	64.95 ft (19.80 m)
Chattahoochee		1863	Gunboat	Confederate States of America (Saffold)	United States (Columbus)	150 ft (46 m)
Daring		1863	Schooner	New Zealand (Mangawhai)	New Zealand (Hobsonville)	55 ft (17 m)
H. L. Hunley		1863	Submarine	Confederate States of America (Mobile)	United States (Charleston)	40 ft (12 m)
Intelligent Whale		1863	Submarine	United States (Unknown)	United States (Sea Girt)	28.8 ft (8.8 m)
Neuse		1863	Ironclad	Confederate States of America (Kinston)	United States (Kinston)	152 ft (46 m)
Star of India		1863	Windjammer	United Kingdom (Isle of Man)	United States (San Diego)	278 ft (85 m)
City of Adelaide		1864	Clipper	United Kingdom (Sunderland)	Australia (Adelaide, South Australia)	244 ft (74 m)
Muscogee		1864	Ironclad	Confederate States of America (Columbus)	United States (Columbus)	223.6 ft (68.2 m)
Strelets		1864	Monitor	Russian Empire (Saint Petersburg)	Russia (Saint Petersburg)	201 ft (61 m)
El Mahrousa		1865	Superyacht	United Kingdom (London)	Egypt (Alexandria)	478 ft (146 m)
Gerda		1865	Steamboat	Sweden–Norway (Gothenburg)	Sweden (Eskilstuna)	44.46 ft (13.55 m)
Huáscar		1865	Monitor	United Kingdom (Birkenhead)	Chile (Talcahuano)	219 ft (67 m)
Sub Marine Explorer		1865 (Note: Built between 1863 and 1865)	Submarine	United States (Brooklyn)	Panama (Pearl Islands)	39.4 ft (12.0 m)
Adelaide		1866	Paddle steamer	Australia (Echuca)	Australia (Echuca)	105.51 m (346.2 ft)
Bjoren		1866	Steamboat	Sweden–Norway (Oslo)	Norway (Bygland)	69 ft (21 m)
Emma C. Berry		1866	Sloop	United States (Noank)	United States (Mystic)	39.2 ft (11.9 m)
Waterlily		1866	Launch	United Kingdom (Chiswick)	United Kingdom (Falmouth)	41.97 ft (12.79 m)
Grönland		1867	Fishing vessel	Sweden–Norway (Unknown)	Germany (Bremerhaven)	84.64 ft (25.80 m)
May Queen		1867	Ketch	Australia (Franklin, Tasmania)	Australia (Hobart, Tasmania)	69 ft (21 m)
Buffel		1868	Ironclad	United Kingdom (Glasgow)	Netherlands (Rotterdam)	196 ft (60 m)
Enköping		1868	Steamship	Sweden–Norway (Oskarshamn)	Sweden (Stockholm)	99 ft (30 m)
Freja af Fryken		1868	Steamship	Sweden–Norway (Motala)	Sweden (Fryksta)	66.47 ft (20.26 m)
Lone Star		1868	Towboat	United States (Lyons)	United States (Le Claire)	90 ft (27 m)
Schorpioen		1868	Ironclad	French Empire (La Seyne-sur-Mer)	Netherlands (Den Helder)	196 ft (60 m)
Cutty Sark		1869	Clipper	United Kingdom (Dumbarton)	United Kingdom (Greenwich)	280 ft (85 m)
Esperance		1869	Saloon launch	United Kingdom (Rutherglen)	United Kingdom (Windermere)	64.95 ft (19.80 m)
Katarina		1869	Steamship	Sweden–Norway (Stockholm)	Finland (Turku)	97.42 ft (29.69 m)
LV44 Carnarvon Bay		1869	Lightvessel	United Kingdom (Bristol)	United Kingdom (Canvey Island)	105.67 ft (32.21 m)
Middlewich		1870	Icebreaker	United Kingdom (Unknown)	United Kingdom (Madeley)	42.10 ft (12.51 m)
Yavari		1870	Lake steamer	United Kingdom (London)	Peru (Lake Titicaca)	100 ft (30 m)
TS ''Atlantic''		1871	Gaff rig	Germany (Hamburg)	Germany (Bremen)	74.47 ft (22.70 m)
Gisela		1871	Paddle steamer	Austria-Hungary (Floridsdorf)	Austria (Unknown)	170.60 ft (52.00 m)
Gurli		1871	Passenger ship	Sweden–Norway (Stockholm)	Sweden (Stockholm)	67.1 ft (20.5 m)
Leitha		1871	River monitor	Austria-Hungary (Budapest)	Hungary (Budapest)	166 ft (51 m)
Lewis R. French		1871	Schooner	United States (South Bristol)	United States (Camden)	101 ft (31 m)
Raven		1871	Steam barge	United Kingdom (Rutherglen)	United Kingdom (Windermere)	70.95 ft (21.63 m)
Stephen Taber		1871	Schooner	United States (Glenwood Landing)	United States (Rockland)	68 ft (21 m)
FK 312		1872	Tugboat	Hungary (Unknown)	Hungary (Balatonboglár)	—N/a
Gjøa		1872	Sloop	Sweden–Norway (Rosendal)	Norway (Oslo)	70 ft (21 m)
Kyles		1872	Cargo ship	United Kingdom (Paisley)	United Kingdom (Irvine)	77.15 ft (23.52 m)
Puno		1872	Hospital ship	United Kingdom (London)	Peru (Lake Titicaca)	100 ft (30 m)
Meiji Maru		1873	Lighthouse tender	United Kingdom (Govan)	Japan (Tokyo)	249.3 ft (76.0 m)
Rap		1873	Torpedo boat	United Kingdom (London)	Norway (Horten)	60 ft (18 m)
Eva		1874	Saloon launch	United Kingdom (Chiswick)	United Kingdom (Henley-on-Thames)	44.98 ft (13.71 m)
PS Hero		1874	Paddle steamer	Australia (Echuca)	Australia (Echuca)	92 ft (28 m)
James Craig		1874	Barque	United Kingdom (Sunderland)	Australia (Sydney)	229.6 ft (70.0 m)
Juno		1874	Passenger ship	Sweden–Norway (Motala)	Sweden (Gothenburg)	103.1 ft (31.45 m)
SS Salama		1874	Steamship	Finland (Vyborg)	Finland (Savonlinna)	103.0 ft (31.4 m)
ARA Uruguay		1874	Corvette	United Kingdom (Birkenhead)	Argentina (Buenos Aires)	150 ft (46 m)
Muñoz Gamero		1875	Full-rigged ship	United Kingdom (Glasgow)	Chile (Punta Arenas)	266.6 ft (81.3 m)
Sölve		1875	Monitor	Sweden–Norway (Norrköping)	Sweden (Gothenburg)	131 ft (40 m)
Anna Karoline		1876	Nordlandsjekt	Sweden–Norway (Mosvik)	Norway (Bodø)	21 ft (6.40 m)
PS Gem		1876	Paddle steamer	Australia (Moama)	Australia (Swan Hill)	131 ft (40 m)
Gustaf Wasa		1876	Passenger ship	Sweden–Norway (Stockholm)	Sweden (Leksand)	98.0 ft (29.9 m)
Lottie Cooper		1876	Schooner	United States (Unknown)	United States (Sheboygan)	131 ft (40 m) (Note: 89-ft. section is preserved)
St. Georg		1876 (Note: Oldest still navigable steamship in Germany)	Steamboat	Germany (Hamburg)	Germany (Alster)	—N/a
Bonaire		1877	Steam frigate	Netherlands (Rotterdam)	Netherlands (Den Helder)	173 ft (53 m)
Elissa		1877	Barque	United Kingdom (Aberdeen)	United States (Galveston, TX)	141 ft (43 m)
Governor Stone		1877	Schooner	United States (Pascagoula)	United States (Panama City)	39 ft (12 m)
Lady of the Lake		1877	Steam yacht	United Kingdom (Glasgow)	United Kingdom (Ullswater)	97 ft (30 m)
Loyal		1877	Ketch	Sweden–Norway (Hardanger)	Norway (TBD)	54 ft (16 m)
Sirius		1877	Yacht	Portugal (TBD)	Portugal (Lisbon)	73.81 ft (22.50 m)
Bayou St. John submarine		1878 (Note: This is the discovery date, it is assumed the submarine is from the Confederacy. No known information is available regarding a launch date or original name.)	Submarine	United States (Unknown location)	United States (Baton Rouge)	20 ft (6.1 m)
Enterprise		1878	Paddle steamer	Australia (Unknown)	Australia (Canberra)	57 ft (17.3 m)
HMS Gannet		1878	Sloop-of-war	United Kingdom (Sheerness, Kent)	United Kingdom (Chatham, Kent)	170 ft (52 m)
Great Canoe		1878	Pacific Northwest	United States (New York City)	63 ft (19 m)	
Holland I		1878	Submarine	United States (New York City)	United States (Paterson)	14 ft (4.3 m)
The Lightship	—N/a	1878	Lightvessel	United Kingdom (Cork)	United Kingdom (Gillingham)	91 ft (28 m)
Lady Elizabeth		1879	Barque	United Kingdom (Sunderland)	Falkland Islands (Stanley)	223 ft (68 m)
Light Vessel 50 H.Y. Tyne	—N/a	1879	Lightvessel	United Kingdom (Unknown)	United Kingdom (Blyth)	99.93 ft (30.46 m)
Stadt Wehlen		1879	Paddle steamer	Germany (Blasewitz)	Germany (Unknown)	194.25 ft (59.21 m)
Vallejo	—N/a	1879	Houseboat (Note: Originally built as a steam ferry)	United States (Portland)	United States (Sausalito)	123.2 ft (37.6 m)
Munter		1879	Steam Launch	Sweden–Norway (Lidköping)	Sweden (Vrena)	39.69 ft (12.1 m)
Annie		1880	Sloop	United States (Mystic)	United States (Mystic)	28 ft (8.5 m)
Ejdern		1880	Passenger ship	Sweden–Norway (Gothenburg)	Sweden (Södertälje)	73.46 ft (22.39 m)
Friedrich		1880	Passenger ship	Germany (Bremen)	Germany (Bremen)	60.13 ft (18.33 m)
Cygnet		1881	Spritsail barge	United Kingdom (Strood)	United Kingdom (Snape)	41.97 ft (12.79 m)
Elise Ann Conners		1881	Tugboat	United States (Camden)	United States (Kingston)	76.5 ft (23.3 m)
Fenian Ram		1881	Submarine	United States (New York City)	United States (Paterson)	30.10 ft (9.17 m)
Holvikejekta		1881	Jekt	Sweden–Norway (Sandane)	Norway (Øyrane)	64 ft (20 m)
Mary D. Hume		1881	Steamboat	United States (Gold Beach)	United States (Gold Beach)	140 ft (43 m)
Meissen		1881	Paddle Steamer	Germany (Unknown)	Germany (Bremerhaven)	—N/a
S:t Erik af Göteborg		1881	Passenger ship	Sweden–Norway (Gothenburg)	Sweden (Gothenburg)	122.28 ft (37.27 m)
Grace Bailey		1882	Schooner	United States (Patchogue)	United States (Camden)	118 ft (36 m)
Joseph Conrad		1882	Sailing ship	Denmark (Copenhagen)	United States (Mystic)	118 ft (36 m)
SL ''Alaska''		1883	River launch	United Kingdom (Bourne End)	United Kingdom (Marlow)	59.67 ft (18.20 m)
HMS Calypso		1883	Unprotected cruiser	United Kingdom (Chatham)	Canada (Embree)	235 ft (72 m)
Christeen		1883	Sloop	United States (Glenwood Landing)	United States (Oyster Bay)	40 ft (12 m)
Nelcebee		1883	Lighter	United Kingdom (Rutherglen)	Australia (Port Adelaide)	107 ft (33 m)
Abdón Calderón		1884	Gunboat	United Kingdom (Port Glasgow)	Ecuador (Guayaquil)	131 ft (40 m)
Kuna		1884	Icebreaker	Poland (Gdańsk)	Poland (Gorzów Wielkopolski)	100 ft (30.48)
Little Jennie	—N/a	1884	Bugeye	United States (Solomons)	United States (Centerport)	54 ft (16 m)
Amazon		1885	Yacht	United Kingdom (Southampton)	Malta (Sliema)	102 ft (31 m)
Coronet		1885	Schooner	United States (Brooklyn)	United States (Newport)	190 ft (58 m)
John Sebastian		1885	Lightvessel	United Kingdom (Bristol)	United Kingdom (Bristol)	102.92 ft (31.37 m)
Partridge		1885	Gaff cutter	United Kingdom (Gosport)	France (La Ciotat)	71.78 ft (21.88 m)
Pioneer		1885	Schooner	United States (Marcus Hook)	United States (New York City)	102 ft (31 m)
Polly Woodside		1885	Barque	United Kingdom (Belfast)	Australia (Melbourne)	192 ft (59 m)
Wavertree		1885	Full-rigged ship	United Kingdom (Southampton)	United States (New York City)	279 ft (85 m)
Balclutha		1886	Full-rigged ship	United Kingdom (Glasgow)	United States (San Francisco)	301 ft (92 m)
Hertha		1886	Steamship	Poland (Szczecin)	Germany (Unknown)	74.86 ft (22.82 m)
Isaac H. Evans		1886	Schooner	United States (Mauricetown)	United States (Rockland, ME)	118 ft (36 m)
L'Almée		1886	Yacht	France (Argenteuil)	France (Aix-les-Bains)	89 ft (27 m)
St. Nicholas		1886–1887	Paddle steamer	Russia (Tyumen)	Russia (Krasnoyarsk)	184.3 ft (56.2 m)
Nordlys	—N/a	1887	Ketch	United Kingdom (Lowestoft)	United Kingdom (Lowestoft)	82.02 ft (25.00 m)
Primrose	—N/a	1887	Barge	United Kingdom (Rye)	United Kingdom (Hastings)	56.39 ft (17.19 m)
RMS Segwun		1887	Steamship	Canada (Gravenhurst)	Canada (Toronto)	125 ft (38.1 m)
Sigyn		1887	Barque	Sweden–Norway (Gothenburg)	Finland (Turku)	189 ft (58 m)
HNoMS Tyr	—N/a	1887	Flat-iron gunboat (Note: Rebuilt as a car ferry)	Sweden–Norway (Horten)	Norway (Kvinnherad)	104.33 ft (31.80 m)
af Chapman		1888	Full-rigged ship	United Kingdom (Whitehaven)	Sweden (Stockholm)	290 ft (88 m)
Akarana		1888	Cutter	New Zealand (Auckland)	Australia (Darling Harbour)	39 ft (12 m)
City of Seattle		1888	Houseboat	United States (Portland)	United States (Sausalito)	121.5 ft (37.0 m)
''Elbe 3''		1888	Lightvessel	Germany (Vegesack)	Germany (Hamburg)	147.96 ft (45.10 m)
Elf		1888	Racing Yacht	United States (Pocomoke City)	United States (St. Michaels)	68 ft (21 m)
Equator		1888	Schooner	United States (San Francisco)	United States (Everett)	78 ft (24 m)
Monarch		1888	Rowing 10	United Kingdom (Unknown)	United Kingdom (Falmouth)	64.95 ft (19.80 m)
Priscilla		1888	Sloop	United States (Patchogue)	United States (West Sayville)	60 ft (18 m)
MS Alli		1888	Pleasure ship	Finland (Varkaus)	Finland (Kuopio)	64.8 ft (19.8 m)
Anna Kristina		1889	Hardangerjakt	Sweden–Norway (Stangvik)	Spain (Canary Islands)	108 ft (33 m)
Arthur Foss		1889	Tugboat	United States (Portland)	United States (Seattle)	120 ft (37 m)
Catarina		1889	Ketch	Germany (Neuhof)	Germany (Hamburg)	52.6 ft (16.0 m)
SS Maggie	—N/a	1889	Houseboat (Note: Originally built as a steam Schooner.)	United States or Denmark (Debated)	United States (Sausalito)	—N/a
MY Raven		1889	Steam yacht	United Kingdom (Rutherglen)	United Kingdom (Ullswater)	112 ft (34 m)
Peral		1889	Submarine	Kingdom of Spain (Arsenal de la Carraca)	Spain (Cartagena)	72 ft (22 m)

=== 1890–1909 ===
Names	Image	Year of construction	Type	Build location	Current location	LOA
Adamant		1890	Narrowboat	United Kingdom (Birmingham)	United Kingdom (Stockton)	56.00 ft (17.07 m)
Dorothy		1890	Tugboat	United States (Newport News)	United States (Newport News)	90 ft (27.4 m)
Ethel von Brixham		1890	Schooner	United Kingdom (Brixham)	Germany (Kiel)	95.14 ft (29.60 m)
Eureka		1890	Ferry	United States (Tiburon)	United States (San Francisco)	299 ft (91.29 m)
Free China		1890	Junk	China (Fujian)	Taiwan (Keelung)	75.4 ft (23.0 m)
Frifararen		1890	Sloop	Sweden–Norway (Orust)	Sweden (Lysekil)	—N/a
Isabella Fortuna		1890	Fifie	United Kingdom (Arbroath)	United Kingdom (Wick)	43.48 ft (13.25 m)
SS Robin		1890	Steamship	United Kingdom (London)	United Kingdom (London)	143 ft (44 m)
Scorpio		1890	Barge	United Kingdom (Unknown)	United Kingdom (Ellesmere Port)	71.97 ft (21.94 m)
Alma		1891	Schooner	United States (San Francisco)	United States (San Francisco)	80 ft (24 m)
Greta		1891	Thames sailing barge	United Kingdom (Brightlingsea)	United Kingdom (Faversham)	80 ft (24 m)
''Guvernøren''		1891	Whaling ship	United Kingdom (Newcastle upon Tyne)	Antarctica (Wilhelmina Bay)	436.3 ft (133.0 m)
''Helka''		1891	Steamship	Hungary (Balatonfüred)	Hungary (Lake Balaton)	115.55 ft (35.22 m)
''Kelén''		1891	Steamship	Hungary (Balatonfüred)	Hungary (Lake Balaton)	115.55 ft (35.22 m)
Nellie		1891	Sloop	United States (Smithtown)	United States (Mystic, CT)	32.7 ft (10.0 m)
Tern		1891	Motor yacht	United Kingdom (Wivenhoe)	United Kingdom (Windermere)	145.7 ft (44.41 m)
Fram		1892	Schooner	Sweden–Norway (Larvik)	Norway (Oslo)	128 ft (39 m)
Janet		1892	Admirals barge	United Kingdom (Isle of Wight)	United Kingdom (Portsmouth)	40.00 ft (12.19 m)
Kestrel	—N/a	1892	Steam yacht	United States (Boston)	United States (Alexandria Bay)	63 ft (19 m)
Leila		1892	Gaff Cutter	United Kingdom (Charlton, London)	United Kingdom (Lincolnshire)	43.13 ft (13.15 m)
Mirosa		1892	Thames sailing barge	United Kingdom (Maldon)	United Kingdom (Faversham)	82.92 ft (25.27 m)
Olympia		1892	Protected cruiser	United States (San Francisco)	United States (Philadelphia)	344 ft (105 m)
Rona		1892	Sailing Yacht	New Zealand (Auckland)	New Zealand (Wellington)	—N/a
Trafik		1892	Steamship	Sweden–Norway (Stockholm)	Sweden (Hjo)	103.87 ft (31.66 m)
Yarmouth Belle		1892	Excursion vessel	United Kingdom (Great Yarmouth)	United Kingdom (Kingston upon Thames)	81.97 ft (25.0 m)
SS Coya		1893	Steamship	United Kingdom (William Denny and Brothers)	Peru (Puno)	170 ft (52 m)
El Primero		1893	Steam yacht	United States (San Francisco)	United States (Bremerton)	120 ft (37 m)
Lettie G. Howard		1893	Schooner	United States (Essex)	United States (New York City)	125 ft (38 m)
Maggie S. Myers	—N/a	1893	Schooner	United States (Bridgeton)	United States (Leipsic)	50 ft (15 m)
Result		1893	Schooner	United Kingdom (Carrickfergus)	United Kingdom (Cultra)	102 ft (31 m)
SS ''Saimaa''		1893	Steamboat	Finland (Turku)	Finland (Gulf of Finland)	81.0 ft (24.7 m)
Viking		1893	Replica Viking ship	Sweden–Norway (Sandefjord)	United States (Chicago)	78 ft (23 m)
Lagaren		1894	Motorship	Sweden–Norway (Stockholm)	Santa Cruz de Tenerife (Spain)	113.68 ft (34.65 m)
Sif		1894	Schooner	Odense, Denmark	Imperia	54.9 ft (16.47m)
RNLB Alfred Corry (ON 353)		1894	Lifeboat	United Kingdom (Great Yarmouth)	United Kingdom (Southwold)	44.1 ft (13.4 m)
Bore		1894	Icebreaker	Sweden–Norway (Malmö)	Sweden (Malmö)	133.00 ft (40.54 m)
Effie M. Morrissey		1894	Schooner	United States (Essex, MA)	United States (New Bedford)	152 ft (46 m)
Henry Ramey Upcher		1894	Lifeboat	United Kingdom (Sheringham)	United Kingdom (Sheringham)	36 ft (11 m)
Spry		1894	Severn Trow	United Kingdom (Chepstow)	United Kingdom (Madeley)	71.5 ft (21.8 m)
Turbinia		1894	Experimental steamship	United Kingdom (Wallsend)	United Kingdom (Newcastle upon Tyne)	102 ft (31 m)
Vridni		1894	Tugboat	Austria-Hungary (Fiume)	Croatia (Split)	42 ft (13 m)
Bessie		1895	Narrowboat	United Kingdom (Brierley Hill)	United Kingdom (Dudley)	69.97 ft (21.33 m)
C.A. Thayer		1895	Schooner	United States (Eureka)	United States (San Francisco)	219 ft (67 m)
Centaur		1895	Thames sailing barge	United Kingdom (Harwich)	United Kingdom (Maldon)	85.7 ft (26.1 m)
Hiawatha		1895	Ferry	Canada (Toronto)	Canada (Toronto)	56 ft (17 m)
Kitty		1895	Thames sailing barge	United Kingdom (Harwich)	United Kingdom (Maldon)	82.13 ft (25.03 m)
Lightvessel Gedser Rev (Note: Lightvessel No. XVII Gedser Rev is the full name of the ship.)		1895	Lightvessel	Denmark (Odense)	Denmark (Nyhavn)	110 ft (34 m)
Motala Express		1895	Steamship	Sweden–Norway (Jönköping)	Sweden (Stockholm)	117.03 ft (35.67 m)
Orinoco		1895	Barge	United Kingdom (Greenwich)	United Kingdom (Faversham)	86.0 ft (26.2 m)
Pilgrim		1895	Brixham trawler	United Kingdom (Brixham)	United Kingdom (Brixham)	74.43 ft (22.69 m)
Belem		1896	Barque	France (Nantes)	France (Nantes)	190 ft (58 m)
Branksome		1896	Saloon launch	United Kingdom (Windermere)	United Kingdom (Windermere)	49.97 ft (15.23 m)
Edna G		1896	Tugboat	United States (Cleveland)	United States (Two Harbors)	92.4 ft (28.2 m)
Genève		1896	Paddle steamer	Switzerland (Winterthur)	Switzerland (Lake Geneva)	208 ft (63 m)
Glenlee		1896	Barque	United Kingdom (Port Glasgow)	United Kingdom (Glasgow)	246 ft (75 m)
''Kishamis''		1896	Sailing boat	Hungary (Balatonfüred)	Hungary (Unknown)	40 ft (12 m)
Lynher		1896	Tamar Barge	United Kingdom (Calstock)	United Kingdom (Cremyll)	51.18 ft (15.60 m)
Meteor		1896	Whaleback	United States (Superior)	United States (Superior)	380 ft (120 m)
Otto		1896	Launch	United Kingdom (Wivenhoe)	United Kingdom (Windermere)	45.48 ft (13.86 m)
Rebecca T. Ruark		1896	Skipjack	United States (Taylors Island)	United States (Tilghman Island)	—N/a
Rickmer Rickmers		1896	Barque	German Empire (Bremerhaven)	Germany (Hamburg)	318 ft (97 m)
MS Kameli		1896	Pleasure ship	Finland (Varkaus)	Finland (Kuopio)	83.66 ft (25.50 m)
Dawn		1897	Spritsail barge	United Kingdom (Maldon)	United Kingdom (West Mersea)	81.93 ft (24.97 m)
Keenora		1897	Passenger ship	Canada (Lake of the Woods)	Canada (Selkirk)	158 ft (48 m)
La Dolce Vita		1897	Hotel barge	Netherlands (Groningen)	Italy (Venice)	69 ft (21 m)
Marianne		1897	Yacht	Sweden–Norway (Gothenburg)	Sweden (Mariestad)	82.45 ft (25.13 m)
HSwMS Najaden		1897	Full-rigged ship	Sweden–Norway (Karlskrona)	Norway (Fredrikstad)	160 ft (49 m)
Presidente Sarmiento		1897	Training ship	United Kingdom (Birkenhead)	Argentina (Buenos Aires)	267 ft (81 m)
St Paul		1897	Lifeboat	United Kingdom (Great Yarmouth)	United Kingdom (Chatham)	38.98 ft (11.88 m)
Wallace Foss	—N/a	1897	Tugboat	United States (Tacoma)	United States (Newport)	62 ft (19 m)
Wyvern		1897	Sailing yacht	Sweden–Norway (Porsgrund Baatbyggeri)	Norway (Stavanger)	59.75 ft (18.21 m)
Albion		1898	Norfolk wherry	United Kingdom (Lake Lothing)	United Kingdom (Ludham)	65 ft (20 m)
Berkeley		1898	Ferry	United States (San Francisco)	United States (San Diego)	279 ft (85 m)
Carola		1898	Steam yacht	United Kingdom (Bowling)	United Kingdom (Irvine)	70.16 ft (21.38 m)
Consuta	—N/a	1898	Umpire's Launch	United Kingdom (Goring-on-Thames)	United Kingdom (River Thames)	49.97 ft (15.23 m)
Edme		1898	Thames sailing barge	United Kingdom (Harwich)	United Kingdom (St Osyth)	80 ft (24 m)
RNLB Jane Anne		1898	Lifeboat	United Kingdom (Thames Iron Works)	United Kingdom (Irvine)	36.9 ft (11.2 m)
Kittiwake		1898	Saloon launch	United Kingdom (Bowness-on-Windermere)	United Kingdom (Windermere)	40.00 ft (12.19 m)
Marjorie		1898	Thames sailing barge	United Kingdom (Ipswich)	United Kingdom (Unknown)	84 ft (25.6 m)
Marquis		1898	Narrowboat	United Kingdom (Saltley Dock)	United Kingdom (Trent & Mersey Canal)	54.00 ft (16.46 m)
Moyie		1898	Paddle steamer	Canada (Toronto)	Canada (Kaslo)	161.7 ft (49.3 m)
Niagara		1898	Thames sailing barge	United Kingdom (Wivenhoe)	United Kingdom (Unknown)	86.7 ft (26.43 m)
Northwich		1898	Narrowboat	United Kingdom (Saltley)	United Kingdom (Gloucester)	71.28 ft (21.73 m)
Nuneham		1898	Passenger vessel	United Kingdom (Brimscombe)	United Kingdom (Windsor)	
Puglia (Note: Bow and bridge section are preserved)		1898	Protected cruiser	Italy (Taranto)	Italy (Vittoriale degli italiani)	289.5 ft (88.25 m)
MS ''Koski''		1898	Pleasure ship	Finland (Varkaus)	Finland (Kuopio)	78.74 ft (24.00 m)
MS ''Puijo''		1898	Pleasure ship	Finland (Maaninka)	Finland (Saimaa)	92.84 ft (28.30 m)
MS ''Ukko''		1898	Pleasure ship	Finland (Lehtoniemi)	Finland (Kuopio)	100.06 ft (30.50 m)
PS Waimarie		1898	Paddle Steamer	United Kingdom (London)	New Zealand (Whanganui River)	100.2 ft (30.5 m)
SB Wyvenhoe		1898	Thames sailing barge	United Kingdom (Wivenhoe)	United Kingdom (Maldon)	85 ft (26 m)
Albatros		1899	Ketch	Netherlands (Capelle aan den IJssel)	Netherlands (Amsterdam)	131 ft (39.9 m)
Decima		1899	Thames sailing barge	United Kingdom (Southampton)	United Kingdom (Dartford)	85 ft (26 m)
Enterprise No 1		1899	Narrowboat	United Kingdom (Unknown)	United Kingdom (Staines)	52 ft (15.86 m)
James Stevens No 10		1899	Lifeboat	United Kingdom (Thames Iron Works)	United Kingdom (St. Ives)	37.50 ft (11.43 m)
Maud		1899	Norfolk wherry	United Kingdom (Reedham)	United Kingdom (Ludham)	60 ft (18 m)
Norrtelje		1899	Steamship	Sweden–Norway (Stockholm)	Sweden (Norrtälje)	145.01 ft (44.20 m)
Shamrock		1899	Tamar Barge	United Kingdom (Stonehouse Creek)	United Kingdom (Cotehele Quay)	56.95 ft (17.36 m)
Stjernen I		1899	Steamship	Sweden–Norway (Oslo)	Norway (Exact location unknown)	56 ft (17 m)
William B. Tennison		1899	Bugeye	United States (Oriole)	United States (Solomons Island)	60.5 ft (18.4 m)
MS ''Pyhäselkä''	—N/a	1899	Pleasure ship	Finland (Varkaus)	Finland (exact location unknown)	102.36 ft (31.20 m)
Angara		1900	Icebreaker	United Kingdom (Newcastle upon Tyne)	Russia (Irkutsk)	200.13 ft (61 m )
Christiaan Brunings		1900	Steamer	Netherlands (Amsterdam)	Netherlands (Amsterdam)	—N/a
Edward M. Cotter		1900	Fireboat	United States (Elizabeth)	United States (Buffalo)	118 ft (36 m)
SY Ena		1900	Steam yacht	Australia (Berrys Bay)	Australia (Sydney)	88 ft (27 m)
SS Howard L. Shaw		1900	Lake Freighter	United States (Wyandotte)	Canada (Ontario Place)	451 ft (137 m)
Ironsides		1900	Thames sailing barge	United Kingdom (Grays)	United Kingdom (Faversham)	84 ft (26 m)
James Stevens No 14		1900	Lifeboat	United Kingdom (Thames Iron Works)	United Kingdom (Walton-on-the-Naze)	42.98 ft (13.10 m)
HMS ''Jarramas''		1900	Tall ship/Frigate	Sweden–Norway (Karlskrona)	Sweden (Karlskrona)	128.4 ft (39.1 m)
Marbury		1900	Icebreaker	United Kingdom (Unknown)	United Kingdom (Ellesmere Port)	40.98 ft (12.49 m)
Mikasa		1900	Pre-dreadnought battleship	United Kingdom (Barrow-in-Furness)	Japan (Yokosuka)	432 ft (132 m)
Regina M.		1900	Sloop	United States-Canada (Passamaquoddy Bay)	United States (Mystic)	—N/a
River Thames Visitor Centre		1900	Thames Lighter	United Kingdom (Unknown)	United Kingdom (Richmond Upon Thames)	60 ft (18.30 m)
Sir Walter Scott		1900	Steamship	United Kingdom (Dumbarton)	United Kingdom (Trossachs)	110 ft (34 m)
Västan		1900	Steamship	Sweden–Norway (Motala)	Sweden (Stockholm)	106.5 ft (32.5 m)
Victory Chimes		1900	Schooner	United States (Bethel)	United States (Rockland)	135 ft (41 m)
Cangarda		1901	Yacht	United States (Wilmington)	United States (Belfast, Maine)	126 ft (38 m)
Chauncy Maples		1901	Motor ship	United Kingdom (Polmadie)	Malawi (Monkey Bay)	126 ft (38 m)
RRS Discovery		1901	Barque	United Kingdom (Dundee)	United Kingdom (Dundee)	172 ft (52 m)
Duchesse Anne		1901	Full-rigged ship	German Empire (Bremerhaven)	France (Dunkirk)	302 ft (92 m)
Gazela		1901	Barquentine	Kingdom of Portugal (Setubal)	United States (Philadelphia)	177 ft (54 m)
Holland 1		1901	Submarine	United Kingdom (Barrow-in-Furness)	United Kingdom (Gosport)	63.10 ft (19.23 m)
Janie Seddon		1901	Submarine minelayer	United Kingdom (Paisley)	New Zealand (Motueka)	90 ft (27 m)
Kathryn		1901	Skipjack	United States (Crisfield)	United States (Chance)	50 ft (15 m)
Lilith		1901	Narrowboat	United Kingdom (Unknown)	United Kingdom (Ashton-under-Lyne)	71.44 ft (21.77 m)
Reaper		1901	Fifie	United Kingdom (Sandhaven)	United Kingdom (Fife)	70.26 ft (21.42 m)
Rocket	—N/a	1901	Tugboat	United States (Buffalo)	Canada (Sault Ste. Marie)	73 ft (22 m)
Sigsbee		1901	Skipjack	United States (Deal Island)	United States (Baltimore)	47 ft (14 m)
Susan May	—N/a	1901	Skipjack	United States (Pocomoke City)	United States (Wenona)	46 ft (14 m)
Tilikum		1901	Dugout canoe	British Canada	Canada (Victoria, British Columbia)	38 ft (12 m)
Urger		1901	Tugboat	United States (Ferrysburg)	United States (Waterford)	73 ft (22 m)
Uri		1901	Paddle Steamer	Switzerland (Winterthur)	Switzerland (Lake Lucerne)	202.7 ft (61.8 m)
HMCC Vigilant		1901	Customs cutter	United Kingdom (Falmouth)	United Kingdom (Chatham)	99.93 ft (30.46 m)
Windsor Belle		1901	Launch	United Kingdom (Windsor)	United Kingdom (Wargrave)	59.48 ft (18.13 m)
Basuto		1902	Clyde puffer	United Kingdom (Port Dundas)	United Kingdom (Ellesmere Port)	65.90 ft (20.10 m)
Columbia		1902	Excursion steamship	United States (Wyandotte)	United States (Buffalo)	207.67 ft (63.30 m)
Irene		1902	Tugboat	United States (Crawford and Reid)	United States (Seattle)	70 ft (21 m)
Jupiter		1902	Tugboat	United States (Philadelphia)	United States (Philadelphia)	101 ft (31 m)
Kung Ring		1902	Passenger ship	Sweden–Norway (Stockholm)	Sweden (Stockholm)	66.08 ft (20.14 m)
Madiz		1902	Yacht	United Kingdom (Ailsa Shipbuilding Company)	—N/a	147.5 ft (45.0 m)
Minx		1902	Sailing Yacht	United Kingdom (Carrickfergus)	United Kingdom Royal North of Ireland Yacht Club	22.5Ft (6.9m)
Normac		1902	Steamship	United States (Port Huron)	Canada (Port Dalhousie)	110 ft (35.2 m)
Osprey		1902	Saloon launch	United Kingdom (Bowness)	United Kingdom (Windermere)	45.48 ft (13.86 m)
USS Sachem		1902	Yacht	United States (Pusey and Jones)	United States (Petersburg)	186 ft (57 m)
Shenandoah		1902	Schooner	United States (New York City	United Kingdom (Sark)	177 ft (54 m)
Silver Heel		1902	Log canoe	United States (Kent County)	United States (Chestertown)	33.11 ft (10.09 m)
Solway Lass		1902	Schooner	Netherlands (Martenshoek)	Australia (Whitsundays Islands)	127 ft (39 m)
Stanley Norman		1902	Skipjack	United States (Salisbury)	United States (Annapolis)	48.3 ft (14.71 m)
Suomen Joutsen		1902	Full-rigged ship	France (Saint-Nazaire)	Finland (Turku)	315 ft (96 m)
Waratah		1902	Tugboat	Australia (Unknown)	Australia (Sydney)	108.5 ft (33.1 m)
Water Viper		1902	Saloon launch	United Kingdom (Windermere)	United Kingdom (Windermere)	42.56 ft (12.97 m)
Alma Doepel		1903	Schooner	Australia (Bellingen)	Australia (Melbourne)	148.3 ft (45.2 m)
Aurora		1903	Protected cruiser	Russian Empire (Saint Petersburg)	Russia (Saint Petersburg)	416 ft (127 m)
Boomerang		1903	Schooner	Australia (Sydney)	Australia (Sydney)	96 ft (29.28 m)
Celtic		1903	Thames sailing barge	Netherlands (Papendrecht)	United Kingdom (Sittingbourne)	90 ft (27.43 m)
Daniel Adamson		1903	Tugboat	United Kingdom (Birkenhead)	United Kingdom (Liverpool)	109.93 ft (33.53 m)
Eleanor		1903	Racing sloop	United States (City Island)	United States (Hudson)	36 ft (11 m)
Garlandstone		1903	Cargo vessel	United Kingdom (Calstock)	United Kingdom (Tavistock)	75.93 ft (23.14 m)
Lightship Finngrundet		1903	Lightvessel	Sweden–Norway (Gävle)	Sweden (Stockholm)	107.6 ft (32.7 m)
Föri		1903	Ferry	Grand Duchy of Finland (Turku)	Finland (Turku)	—N/a
Light Vessel 72		1903	Lightvessel	United Kingdom (Sunderland)	United Kingdom (Neath)	115.93 ft (35.34 m)
SS ''Mariefred''		1903	Passenger ship	Sweden–Norway (Stockholm)	Sweden (Mariefred)	107.74 ft (32.84 m)
Ohio	—N/a	1903	Tugboat	United States (Chicago)	United States (Toledo)	118 ft (36 m)
Pommern		1903	Barque	United Kingdom (Glasgow)	Finland (Åland)	311.8 ft (95.0 m)
Alose		1904	Submarine	France (Toulon)	France (Marseille)	77.9 ft (23.7 m)
Ariki		1904	Yacht	New Zealand (Logan Brothers)	New Zealand (Auckland)	54 ft (16.45 m)
Barnegat		1904	Lightship	United States (Camden)	United States (Camden)	129 ft (39 m)
STV Black Jack		1904	Brigantine	United Kingdom (Scotland)	Canada (Quyon)	87 ft (27 m)
SS ''Boxholm II''		1904	Steamship	Sweden–Norway (Kristianstad)	Sweden (Sommen)	67.61 ft (20.61 m)
Dispatch II	—N/a	1904	Tugboat	United Kingdom (England)	Canada (Sault Ste. Marie)	42 ft (13 m)
Fannie L. Daugherty		1904	Skipjack	United States (Crisfield)	United States (Wenona)	41.3 ft (12.6 m)
''Hajen''		1904	Submarine	Sweden–Norway (Stockholm)	Sweden (Karlskroma)	76.4 ft (23.3 m)
Henry		1904	Spritsail barge	United Kingdom (Grays)	United Kingdom (Faversham)	76.26 ft (23.24 m)
James & Mary Walker	—N/a	1904	Lifeboat	United Kingdom (London)	United Kingdom (Anstruther)	38.00 ft (11.58 m)
RNLB J C Madge (ON 536)		1904	Lifeboat	United Kingdom (Thames Iron Works)	United Kingdom (Sheringham Museum)	41 ft (12 m)
SS ''Leppävirta''		1904	Pleasure ship	Finland (Varkaus)	Finland (Lappeenranta)	88.09 ft (26.85 m)
Maple Leaf		1904	Schooner	Canada (Vancouver)	Canada (Vancouver)	92 ft (28 m)
Medea		1904	Steam yacht	United Kingdom (Glasgow)	United States (San Diego)	134 ft (41 m)
SS Milwaukee Clipper		1904	Ferry	United States (Cleveland)	United States (Muskegon)	361 ft (110 m)
PS ''Montreux''		1904	Paddle Steamer	Switzerland (Winterthur)	Switzerland (Lake Geneva)	206.6 ft (63.0 m)
Moshulu		1904	Barque	United Kingdom (Port Glasgow)	United States (Philadelphia)	396 ft (121 m)
Piemonte		1904	Paddle Steamer	Switzerland (Zürich)	Switzerland (Lake Maggiore)	167 ft (51 m)
Provider	—N/a	1904	Schooner	United Kingdom (Fleetwood)	United Kingdom (Tayvallich)	45.97 ft (14.01 m)
Sava		1904	Monitor	Austria-Hungary (Újpest)	Serbia (Belgrade)	189 ft (58 m)
Seamew		1904–08	Yard tender	United Kingdom (Fairlie)	United Kingdom (Irvine)	25 ft (7.6 m)
Swiftsure (LV-83)		1904	Lightship	United States (Camden)	United States (Seattle)	129.6 ft (39.47 m)
Virginia W		1904	Skipjack	United States (Guilford)	United States (Cambridge)	37.5 ft (11.4 m)
Woltman		1904	Tugboat	Germany (Roßlau)	Germany (Hamburg)	72.10 ft (21.98 m)
SS Amasa Stone		1905	Lake freighter (Note: Hull is now a breakwater)	United States (Wyandotte)	United States (Charlevoix)	545 ft (166 m)
BAP ''América''		1905	Gunboat	United Kingdom (Liverpool)	Peru (Iquitos)	134 ft (41 m)
Asgard		1905	Sailing yacht	Norway (Larvik)	Ireland (Collins Barracks)	50.9 ft (15.5 m)
Doris		1905	Sailing yacht	United States (Deep River)	United States (Deep River)	77.6 ft (23.7 m)
MS Fæmund II		1905	Ferry	Norway (Trondheim)	Norway (Femund)	82 ft (25 m)
Hathor		1905	Norfolk wherry	United Kingdom (Reedham)	United Kingdom (Wroxham)	56 ft (17 m)
Hermann		1905	Sailboat	Germany (Wewelsfleth)	Germany (Hamburg)	—N/a
Hilda M. Willing		1905	Skipjack	United States (Oriole)	United States (Chance)	40 ft (12 m)
SS ''Karjalankoski''		1905	Pleasure ship	Finland (Joroinen)	Finland (Kuopio)	79.39 ft (24.20 m)
Kieler Sprotte		1905	Steamboat	Germany (Rostock)	Germany (Kiel)	71.4 ft (21.8 m)
SS Ridgetown		1905	Lake freighter	United States (Chicago)	Canada (Mississauga)	569 ft (176.4 m)
Sheila		1905	Canoe Yawl	Isle of Man	France (Golfe du Morbihan)	23 ft (7.6m)
MS Jässi		1905	Pleasure ship	Finland (Varkaus)	Finland (Kuopio)	52.82 ft (16.10 m)
Alexander von Humboldt		1906	Barque	Germany (Bremen)	Germany (Bremerhaven)	205.2 ft (62.55 m)
Baltimore		1906	Tugboat	United States (Baltimore)	United States (Baltimore)	84.5 ft (25.8 m)
Blümlisalp		1906	Paddle steamer	Switzerland (Zürich)	Switzerland (Lake Thun)	198.33 ft (60.45 m)
Bussard		1906 (Note: Sea going museum ship)	Steamboat	Germany (Papenburg)	Germany (Kiel)	139.7 ft (42.6 m)
SB Cambria		1906	Thames sailing barge	United Kingdom (Greenhithe)	United Kingdom (Faversham)	90.95 ft (27.72 m)
Edith May		1906	Thames sailing barge	United Kingdom (Harwich)	United Kingdom (Lower Halstow)	20.75 ft (6.32 m)
SB Ena		1906	Thames sailing barge	United Kingdom (Harwich)	United Kingdom (Hoo St Werburgh)	88.13 ft (26.86 m)
Ida May		1906	Skipjack	United States (Somewhere in Virginia)	United States (Chance)	42.2 ft (12.9 m)
Minnehaha		1906	Steamboat	United States (Minnesota)	United States (Minnesota)	70 ft (21 m)
Östanå I		1906	Passenger ferry	Sweden (Stockholm)	Sweden (Stockholm)	115 ft (35 m)
Saturn		1906	Narrowboat	United Kingdom (Chester)	United Kingdom (Shropshire Union Canal)	71.60 ft (21.82 m)
SS St. Marys Challenger		1906 (Note: Converted to an articulated barge in 2013. Bow section remains the same while the superstructure has changed.)	Lake Freighter	United States (River Rouge)	United States (Great Lakes)	551 ft (167.945 m)
Thalatta		1906	Thames sailing barge	United Kingdom (Harwich)	United Kingdom (St Osyth)	88.9 ft (27.1 m)
Ticonderoga		1906	Paddle steamer	United States (Shelburne)	United States (Shelburne)	220 ft (67 m)
U-1		1906	Submarine	German Empire (Kiel)	Germany (Munich)	139.1 ft (42.4 m)
Viking		1906	Barque	Denmark (Copenhagen)	Sweden (Gothenburg)	387.2 ft (118.0 m)
Viola		1906	Trawler	United Kingdom (Beverley)	South Georgia (Grytviken)	108.50 ft (33.07 m)
Ambrose (LV-87)		1907	Lightvessel	United States (Camden)	United States (Manhattan)	135.5 ft (41.28 m)
Andechs		1907	Paddle steamer	Germany (Stegen am Ammersee)	Germany (Holzhausen am Ammersee)	111.5 ft (34.0 m)
Charles Henry Ashley		1907	Lifeboat	United Kingdom (Thames Ironworks and Shipbuilding Company)	United Kingdom (Cemaes Bay)	37.97 ft (11.57 m)
Daniel McAllister		1907	Tugboat	Canada (Collingwood)	Canada (Montreal, QC)	108.9 ft (33.2 m)
Drazki		1907	Torpedo boat	France (Chalon-sur-Saône)	Bulgaria (Varna)	124 ft (38 m)
F. C. Lewis Jr.	—N/a	1907	Skipjack	United States (Hopkins)	United States (Wenona, MD)	39 ft (12 m)
MS Henrik Ibsen		1907	Steamship	Sweden (Gothenburg)	Norway (Telemark Canal)	101.5 ft (30.9 m)
Hercules		1907	Tugboat	United States (Camden)	United States (San Francisco)	151 ft (46 m)
Hjälparen		1907	Lifeboat	Sweden (Stockholm)	Sweden (Stockholm)	30.8 ft (9.4 m)
Irene		1907	Ketch	United Kingdom (Bridgwater)	United Kingdom (Bridgwater)	100 ft (30 m)
Keewatin		1907	Passenger liner	United Kingdom (Govan)	Canada (Kingston, Ontario)	336.5 ft (102.6 m)
Lyttelton		1907	Tugboat	United Kingdom (Scotland)	New Zealand (Port Lyttelton)	—N/a
Moewe		1907	Ketch	Germany (Itzehoe)	Germany (Hamburg)	58.59 ft (17.86 m)
Nyanza		1907	Steamship	United Kingdom (Renfrewshire)	Kenya (Kisumu)	—N/a
Prince Otman	—N/a	1907	Yacht	United Kingdom (Fleetwood)	United Kingdom (Palma)	92 ft (28 m)
Rosa		1907	Hotel barge	Netherlands (Dedemsvaart)	France (Canal Latéral de la Garonne)	98 ft (30 m)
SS ''Suur-Saimaa''		1907	Pleasure ship	Finland (Varkaus)	Finland (Savonlinna)	90.38 ft (27.55 m)
Tarmo		1907	Icebreaker	United Kingdom (Newcastle upon Tyne)	Finland (Kotka)	220 ft (67 m)
Yankee		1907	Ferry	United States (Kensington)	United States (New York City)	136.6 ft (41.6 m)
SS Wipunen		1907	Steamboat	Finland (Varkaus)	Finland (Kuopio)	62.00 ft (18.90 m)
Alexandra		1908	Steamship	Germany (Hamburg)	Germany (Flensburg)	121.25 ft (36.96 m)
Circle Line XIV		1908	Tour boat	United States (Newburgh)	United States (Jersey City)	123 ft (37 m)
Fehmarnbelt		1908	Lightvessel	Germany (Brake, Lower Saxony)	Germany (Lübeck)	149.1 ft (45.44 m)
Mohican II		1908	Steamship	United States (Newburgh)	United States (Lake George)	117 ft (36 m)
Monarch		1908	Narrowboat	United Kingdom (Saltley Dock)	United Kingdom (Trent & Mersey Canal)	61.97 ft (18.89 m)
Oscar W		1908	Paddle steamer	Australia (Echuca)	Australia (River Murray)	103.1 ft (31.42 m)
Oster		1908	Steamship	Norway (Kristiansand)	Norway (Bergen)	104 ft (32 m)
Raeo		1908	Tugboat	United States (Bronx)	United States (Wenatchee)	72 ft (22 m)
Sabino		1908	Steamship	United States (Boothbay)	United States (Mystic)	57 ft (17 m)
Sharpness		1908	Tugboat	United Kingdom (Branscombe)	United Kingdom (Braunston)	44.98 ft (13.72 m)
Speeder		1908	Motor vessel	United States (Seattle, WA)	United States (Exact location unknown)	87 ft (26.52 m)
Storskär		1908	Steamship	Sweden (Gothenburg)	Sweden (Stockholm)	127.8 ft (39.0 m)
Thalis o Milisios		1908	Cable ship	United States (Newport News)	Greece (Palaio Faliro)	—N/a
Angantyr		1909	Ferry	Sweden (Motala Verkstad)	Sweden (Stockholm)	76 ft (23 m)
Ardwina		1909	Thames sailing barge	United Kingdom (Ipswich)	United Kingdom (London)	85 ft (26 m)
Arkansas		1909	Tugboat	United States (Cleveland)	United States (Wilmington)	75 ft (23 m)
Bigwin	—N/a	1909	Steamship	Canada (Toronto)	Canada (Dorset)	66 ft (20 m)
Black Pearl		1909	Schooner	Sweden (Pukavik)	Malta (Ta'Xbiex)	150 ft (46 m)
Bürgermeister Abendroth		1909	Lightvessel	Germany (Tönning)	Germany (Bremerhaven)	144 ft (44 m)
Dar Pomorza		1909	Frigate	German Empire (Hamburg)	Poland (Gdynia)	267 ft (81 m)
Doris		1909	Thames bawley	United Kingdom (Harwich)	United Kingdom (Gillingham)	40.00 ft (12.19 m)
Drottningholm		1909	Ferry	Sweden (Motala Verkstad)	Sweden (Stockholm)	76 ft (23 m)
Duwamish		1909	Fireboat	United States (Shoreline)	United States (Seattle)	120 ft (37 m)
Großherzogin Elisabeth		1909	Schooner	Netherlands (Alblasserdam)	Germany (Elsfleth)	209 ft (64 m)
Kysten		1909	Steamship	Norway (Trondheim)	Norway (Tønsberg)	140 ft (43 m)
Lizzie Porter		1909	Lifeboat	United Kingdom (Thames Ironworks and Shipbuilding Company)	United Kingdom (Chatham Historic Dockyard)	34.98 ft (10.67 m)
Lotus		1909	Motor ship	United States (Seattle)	United States (Seattle)	85 ft (26 m)
President		1909	Narrowboat	United Kingdom (Saltley)	United Kingdom (Dudley)	71 ft (22 m)
Stadt Zürich		1909	Paddle steamer	Switzerland (Zürich)	Switzerland (Lake Zürich)	193.9 ft (59.1 m)
Steam Pinnace 199		1909	Pinnace	United Kingdom (Portsmouth)	United Kingdom (Portsmouth)	50 ft (15 m)
Unyo Maru		1909	Training ship	Japan (Osaka Iron Works)	Japan (Tokyo)	136.1 ft (41.51 m)
William Riley of Birmingham		1909	Lifeboat	United Kingdom (Thames Iron Works)	United Kingdom (Whitby)	33.97 ft (10.35 m)

=== 1910–1918 ===
Names	Image	Year of construction	Type	Build location	Current location	Length overall
George		1910	Short boat	United Kingdom (Wigan)	United Kingdom (Ellesmere Port)	61.97 ft (18.89 m)
Georgios Averof		1910	Armored cruiser	Kingdom of Italy (Livorno)	Greece (Palaio Faliro)	459.7 ft (140.1 m)
Gonca		1910	Steam yacht	—N/a	Turkey (Istanbul)	104.9 ft (32.0 m)
Grimsby		1910	Narrowboat	United Kingdom (Saltley Dock)	United Kingdom (Trent & Mersey Canal)	71.60 ft (21.82 m)
RNLB Helen Smitton (ON 603)		1910	Lifeboat	United Kingdom (Thames Iron Works)	United Kingdom (Marloes)	37.97 ft (11.57 m)
RNLB James Leith		1910	Lifeboat	United Kingdom (TBD)	United Kingdom (TBD)	—N/a
Juneta	—N/a	1910	Tugboat	United States (Astoria)	United States (Portland)	43 ft (13 m)
Krasnyy Vympel		1910	Yacht	Russia (Saint Petersburg)	Russia (Vladivostok)	151.9 ft (46.3 m)
La Suisse		1910	Paddle steamer	—N/a	Switzerland (Lausanne-Ouchy)	257.5 ft (78.5 m)
Laurindo Pitta		1910 (Note: Laurindo Pitta is active at times when doing water tours.)	Tugboat	Great Britain (Barrow-in-Furness)	Brazil (Rio de Janeiro)	129 ft (39 m)
Noorderlicht		1910	Schooner	German Empire (Flensburg)	Norway (Svalbard)	151.7 ft (46.2 m)
Norrskär		1910	Steamship	Sweden (Gothenburg)	Sweden (Stockholm)	114.3 ft (34.8 m)
North Dakota		1910	Tugboat	United States (Cleveland	United States (Wilmington)	81 ft (25 m)
Sand Man		1910	Tugboat	United States (Tacoma) (Note: Wheelhouse was built in Olympia.)	United States (Olympia)	60 ft (18 m)
Ste. Claire		1910	Excursion steamship	United States (Toledo Shipbuilding Company)	United States (Detroit)	190 ft (58 m)
Suriname-Rivier		1910	Lightvessel	Netherlands (Haarlem)	Suriname (Nieuw Amsterdam)	81.6 ft (24.85 m)
Tiger		1910	Tugboat	Germany (Hamburg)	Germany (Hamburg)	52.02 ft (15.86 m)
Trillium		1910	Ferry	Canada (Toronto)	Canada (Toronto)	150 ft (46 m)
Atlinto	—N/a	1911	Launch	Canada (Atlin, BC)	Canada (Atlin, BC)	41 ft (12 m)
SS ''Blidösund''		1911	Steamship	Sweden (Göteborg)	Sweden (Stockholm)	115.7 ft (35.3 m)
Claude W. Somers		1911	Skipjack	United States (Young's Creek)	United States (Reedville)	42.5 ft (13.0 m)
Connaught		1911	Passenger vessel	United Kingdom (Oxford)	United Kingdom (Richmond Upon Thames)	105.93 ft (32.31 m)
Europa		1911	Barque	Germany (Hamburg)	Netherlands (Amsterdam)	131 ft (40 m)
Eye of the Wind		1911	Brigantine	Germany (Brake)	Germany (exact location unknown)	132 ft (40 m)
Hestmanden		1911	Merchant ship	Norway (Laksevåg)	Norway (Kristiansand)	195 ft (59 m)
James M. Schoonmaker		1911	Lake freighter	United States (Ecorse)	United States (Toledo)	617 ft (188 m)
McKeever Brothers (SP-683)		1911	Patrol vessel	United States (Noank, CT)	United States (Seaford, DE)	136 ft (41 m)
Nomadic		1911	Tender	United Kingdom (Belfast)	United Kingdom (Belfast)	220 ft (67 m)
Nusret		1911	Minelayer	German Empire (Kiel)	Turkey (Tarsus)	131 ft (40.20 m)
Passat		1911	Barque	German Empire (Hamburg)	Germany (Lübeck)	377 ft (115 m)
Peking		1911	Barque	German Empire (Hamburg)	Germany (Hamburg)	377.6 ft (115.1 m)
Tennessee		1911	Tugboat	United States (Cleveland)	United States (Wilmington)	81 ft (25 m)
Thomas W. Clyde		1911	Skipjack	United States (Oriole)	United States (Deal Island)	54.4 ft (16.6 m)
Tordenskjold		1911	Schooner	United States (Seattle)	United States (Seattle)	75 ft (23 m)
Tradewind		1911	Schooner	Netherlands (Capelle aan de IJssel)	Netherlands (Exact location unknown)	121 ft (37 m)
Wäiski		1911	Passenger ship	Germany (Einswarden)	Finland (Helsinki)	157.48 ft (48.00 m)
''Zeelands Luister''		1911	Barge	Netherlands (Vrijenban)	Netherlands (Rotterdam)	128.8 ft (39.3 m)
African Queen		1912	Boat	United Kingdom (Lytham)	United States (Key Largo)	30 ft (9.1 m)
''Albatros''		1912	Steamboat	Germany (Papenburg)	Germany (Damp)	119.81 ft (36.52 m)
Canberra		1912	Paddle Steamer	Australia (Echuca)	Australia (Echuca)	74 ft (22.6 m)
Cartela		1912	Ferry	Australia (Hobart)	Australia (Hobart)	123 ft (37 m)
TSS Earnslaw		1912	Steamship	New Zealand (Dunedin)	New Zealand (Lake Wakatipu)	168 ft (51 m)
Garðar BA 64		1912	Whaler	Norway (Unknown)	Iceland (Patreksfjörður)	100.39 ft (30.6 m)
MS Gustaf III		1912	Steamship	Sweden (Stockholm)	Sweden (Stockholm)	76.11 ft (23.20 m)
MV Gustafsberg VII		1912	Steamship	Sweden (Oskarshamn)	Sweden (Stockholm)	113.7 ft (34.7 m)
Herons	—N/a	1912	Houseboat	United Kingdom (Unknown)	United Kingdom (Brentford)	48.50 ft (14.78 m)
Hospital Boat No. 67	—N/a	1912	Hospital boat	United Kingdom (Isle of Wight)	United Kingdom (Devonshire)	70 ft (21 m)
Hyöky		1912	Lightvessel	Russia (Saint Petersburg)	Finland (Hamina)	140.09 ft (42.70 m)
Ilford		1912	Narrowboat	United Kingdom (West Bromwich)	United Kingdom (TBD)	70.46 ft (21.48 m)
James Caird		1912	Whaleboat	United Kingdom (London)	United Kingdom (London)	22.5 ft (6.9 m)
MS J. L. Runeberg		1912	Steamship	Finland (Helsinki)	Finland (Gulf of Finland)	94.4 ft (28.8 m)
Kanangra		1912	Ferry	Australia (Mort's Dock)	Australia (Sydney)	149.18 ft (45.47 m)
Katherine M. Lee	—N/a	1912	Oyster schooner	United States (Greenwich)	United States (Leipsic)	85 ft (26 m)
Kerne		1912	Tugboat	United Kingdom (Montrose)	United Kingdom (Liverpool)	76.95 ft (23.47 m)
Kwasind		1912	Ferry	Canada (Toronto)	Canada (Toronto)	71 ft (22 m)
La Palma		1912	Steamship	United Kingdom (Middlesbrough)	Canary Islands (Tenerife)	220.14 ft (67.10 m)
Lady Denman		1912	Ferry	Australia (Huskisson)	Australia (City of Shoalhaven)	110 ft (34 m)
Sundowner		1912	Yacht	United Kingdom (Sheerness, Kent)	United Kingdom (Ramsgate, Kent)	58 ft (18 m)
Swell		1912	Tugboat	Canada (Vancouver, British Columbia)	Canada (Victoria)	88 ft (27 m)
Wendameen		1912	Schooner	United States (Boothbay)	United States (Portland)	67 ft (20 m)
Zhongshan		1912	Gunboat	Japan (Nagasaki)	China (Wuhan)	216.12 ft (65.87 m)
Acadia		1913	Survey vessel	United Kingdom (Tyne and Wear)	Canada (Halifax)	182 ft (55 m)
Adanac III	—N/a	1913	Tugboat	Canada (Port Arthur)	Canada (Sault Ste. Marie)	80 ft (24 m)
Adventuress		1913	Schooner	United States (Boothbay)	United States (Seattle)	133 ft (41 m)
Benjamim Guimarães		1913	Paddle steamer	United States (Pittsburgh, PA)	Brazil (Pirapora)	144 ft (44 m)
Claus D		1913	Tugboat	Germany (Hamburg)	Germany (Hamburg)	58.26 ft (17.76 m)
Count Dracula	—N/a	1913	Launch	German Empire (Wilhemshaven)	United Kingdom (Hayling Island)	50.00 ft (15.24 m)
''Jókai''		1913	Steamship	Hungary (TBD)	Hungary (TBD)	118.43 ft (36.10 m)
Jolie Brise		1913	Cutter	France (Le Havre)	United Kingdom (Hamble)	73.10 ft (22.28 m)
Kildare		1913	Narrowboat	United Kingdom (TBD)	United Kingdom (Dudley)	76.60 ft (23.35 m)
Kommuna		1913	Salvage Vessel	Russian Empire (St. Petersburg)	Sevastopol (Note: Sevastopol is a city in Crimea) (Disputed)	315 ft (96 m)
''Kossuth''		1913	Steamship	Hungary (TBD)	Hungary (TBD)	202.7 ft (61.80 m)
Kyle		1913	Steamship	United Kingdom (Tyne and Wear)	Canada (Harbour Grace)	220 ft (67 m)
MV North Head		1913	Ferry	Australia (Woolwich)	Australia (Cairns)	210 ft (64 m)
Rusinga	—N/a	1913	Ferry	United Kingdom (Renfrewshire)	Kenya (Kisumu)	220 ft (67 m)
Oklahoma	—N/a	1913	Tugboat	United States (Cleveland)	United States (Wilmington)	81 ft (25 m)
SS Stord I		1913	Passenger ship	Norway (Bergen)	Norway (Bergen)	—N/a
SS Usoga		1913	Ferry	United Kingdom (Renfrewshire)	Kenya (Kisumu)	220 ft (67 m)
SS ''Lokki''		1913	Pleasure ship	Finland (Varkaus)	Finland (Helsinki)	78.58 ft (23.95 m)
Belle of Louisville		1914	Paddle steamer	United States (Pittsburgh)	United States (Louisville)	157.5 ft (48.0 m)
Borcea		1914	Paddle steamer	Romania (Turnu Severin)	Romania (Brăila)	129 ft (39.4 m)
Bustardthorpe	—N/a	1914	Lighter	United Kingdom (Gainsborough)	United Kingdom (Abingdon)	91.93 ft (28.02 m)
Caroline		1914	Light cruiser	United Kingdom (Birkenhead)	United Kingdom (Belfast)	420 ft (130 m)
Doulos Phos		1914 (Note: Retains its original engines and other machinery as well as its stern section)	Cruise ship	United States (Newport News)	Indonesia (Bintan Regency)	428 ft (130 m)
Eppleton Hall		1914	Tugboat	United Kingdom (South Shields)	United States (San Francisco)	100.5 ft (30.6 m)
Frédéric Mistral		1914	Tugboat	Netherlands (Geertruidenberg)	Austria (Vienna)	26.35 m (86.5 ft)
Fulton		1914	Schooner	Denmark (Marstal)	Denmark (Marstal)	38 m (124.7 ft)
Halas 71	—N/a	1914	Ferry	United Kingdom (Glasgow)	Turkey (Istanbul)	164.04 ft (50.00 m)
Hazel		1914	Narrowboat	United Kingdom (Runcorn)	United Kingdom (Ashton-under-Lyne)	71.97 ft (21.94 m)
Hercules		1914	Floating crane	Germany (Emden)	Panama (Panama Canal)	152 ft (46 m)
Horns Rev		1914	Lightvessel	Denmark (Fåborg)	Denmark (Esbjerg)	110.18 ft (33.58 m)
Alaska		1914	Tugboat	United States (Cleveland)	United States (Wilmington)	71 ft (22 m)
Katahdin		1914	Steamboat	United States (Bath Iron Works)	United States (Greenville)	102 ft (31 m)
L.V. Railroad Barge No. 79		1914	Barge	United States (Perth Amboy)	United States (Brooklyn)	36 ft (11 m)
Libby's No. 23		1914	Sailboat (Fishing vessel)	United States (Seattle)	United States (Port Alsworth)	29.6 ft (9.0 m)
Naramata		1914	Tugboat	Canada (Okanagan Landing)	Canada (Penticton)	98 ft (30 m)
Perth		1914	Ferry	United Kingdom (Glasgow)	Australia (Perth)	103 ft (31 m)
Pilot		1914	Pilot boat	United States (San Diego)	United States (San Diego)	52 ft (16 m)
Sicamous		1914	Sternwheeler	Canada (Port Arthur, Ontario)	Canada (Penticton)	200.5 ft (61.1 m)
Stadt Rapperswil		1914	Paddle steamer	Switzerland (Zürich)	Switzerland (Lake Zürich)	193.9 ft (59.1 m)
Statsraad Lehmkuhl		1914	Training ship	German Empire (Bremerhaven)	Norway (Bergen)	320 ft (98 m)
Suur Tõll		1914	Icebreaker	German Empire (Stettin)	Estonia (Tallinn)	247 ft (75.4 m)
SSV Tabor Boy	—N/a	1914	Sailboat	Netherlands (Amsterdam)	United States (Marion)	92 ft (28 m)
Texas		1914	Dreadnought battleship	United States (Newport News)	United States (La Porte)	573 ft (175 m)
USS Zumbrota		1914	Motor boat	United States (Port Clinton)	United States (Marina del Rey)	70 ft (21 m)
Addie		1915	Tugboat	United Kingdom (Brinscombe)	United Kingdom (London)	63.93 ft (19.49 m)
Amrumbank		1915	Lightvessel	Germany (Papenburg)	Germany (Emden)	172.2 ft (52.5 m)
Atta Boy		1915	Motor launch	United Kingdom (Suffolk)	United Kingdom (Thames)	30 ft (9.1 m)
Bradbury		1915	Patrol boat	Canada (Selkirk, Manitoba)	Canada (Selkirk, Manitoba)	158 ft (48 m)
Brandram	—N/a	1915	X Lighter	United Kingdom (Sunderland)	United Kingdom (Stoke)	105 ft (32 m)
Cyclops		1915	Admiralty pinnace	United Kingdom (Portsmouth)	United Kingdom (Portsmouth)	42.00 ft (12.80 m)
Glala	—N/a	1915	Yacht	United Kingdom (Hamble)	United Kingdom (Ipswich)	78.00 ft (23.77 m)
Iowa		1915	Tugboat	United States (Cleveland)	United States (Wilmington)	75 ft (23 m)
Katie (SP-660)		1915	Patrol vessel	United States (Crittenden)	United States (Richmond)	48 ft (15 m)
Langer Heinrich		1915	Floating crane	Germany (Duisburg)	Italy (Genoa)	165 ft (50 m)
Liemba		1915	Ferry	German Empire (Papenburg)	Tanzania (Kigoma)	234.25 ft (71.40 m)
Light Ship Petrel		1915	Lightvessel	Ireland (Dublin Dockyard Company)	United Kingdom (Strangford)	99 ft (30 m)
M33		1915	Monitor	United Kingdom (Belfast)	United Kingdom (Portsmouth)	177 ft (54 m)
Marie Galante		1915	Schooner	Germany (Unknown)	Netherlands (Amsterdam)	121 ft (37 m)
Miseford		1915	Tugboat	Canada (Welland	Canada (Thunder Bay)	80 ft (24 m)
Peacock		1915	Narrowboat	United Kingdom (Birmingham)	United Kingdom (Dudley)	69.97 ft (21.33 m)
Peter P		1915	X Lighter	United Kingdom (Sunderland)	United Kingdom (Barking Creek)	109.93 ft (33.51 m)
Sankt Erik		1915	Icebreaker	Sweden (Stockholm)	Sweden (Stockholm)	200 ft (61 m)
See W. See (SP-740)		1915	Patrol vessel	United States (Bay Shore)	United States (Richmond)	65 ft (20 m)
Skjelskør		1915	Steamship	Denmark (Svendborg)	Denmark (Frederikssund)	67.4 ft (20.5 m)
Spithead	—N/a	1915	X Lighter	United Kingdom (Sunderland)	United Kingdom (Sandwich)	105.50 ft (32.16 m)
Wilhelm Carpelan		1915	Transport boat	Finland (Helsinki)	Finland (Turku)	60.8 ft (18.5 m)
Coastal Motor Boat 4		1916	Torpedo boat	United Kingdom (London)	United Kingdom (Duxford)	40.00 ft (12.19 m)
Coastal Motor Boat 9	—N/a	1916	Torpedo boat	United Kingdom (London)	United Kingdom (Avonmouth)	40.00 ft (12.19 m)
Krassin		1916	Icebreaker	United Kingdom (Newcastle upon Tyne)	Russia (Saint Petersburg)	327.4 ft (99.8 m)
Lilian		1916	Yacht	Sweden (Stockholm)	United Kingdom (Twickenham)	98.43 ft (30.00 m)
MAS 15		1916	Torpedo boat	Italy (Unknown)	Italy (Rome)	—N/a
Mercantile		1916	Schooner	United States (Little Deer Isle)	United States (Camden)	155 ft (47 m)
Portsmouth Lightship		1916	Lightvessel	United States (Pusey and Jones)	United States (Portsmouth)	101 ft (31 m)
Skeaf VII		1916	Sailing cruiser	Germany (Lemwerder)	France (Douarnenez, Bretagne)	92 ft (28 m)
SM UB-46		1916	U-boat	Germany (Bremen)	Turkey (Çanakkale)	121.1 ft (36.9 m)
Carlisle II		1917	Ferry	United States (Bellingham)	United States (Port Orchard)	65 ft (20 m)
CLS2 Carpentaria		1917	Lightvessel	Australia (Sydney)	Australia (Queensland Maritime Museum)	72.0 ft (21.9 m)
CLS4 Carpentaria		1917	Lightvessel	Australia (Sydney)	Australia (Darling Harbour)	72.0 ft (21.9 m)
Commander		1917	Motor vessel	United States (Morehead City)	United States (New York City)	60 ft (18 m)
Flashing Stream	—N/a	1917	Pinnace	United Kingdom (Chatham)	United Kingdom (Bristol)	—N/a
L'Art de Vivre		1917	Hotel barge	United Kingdom (Deptford)	France (Bordeaux)	100 ft (30 m)
''MAS 96''		1917	Torpedo boat	Italy (Unknown)	Italy (Gardone Riviera)	52 ft (16 m)
Hausten		1917	Sailing ship	Norway (Vollen)	Norway (Tofte)	119 ft (19 m)
Louisiana		1917	Tugboat	United States (Cleveland)	United States (Wilmington)	81 ft (25 m)
Maud		1917	Sailing ship	Norway (Vollen)	Norway (Tofte)	119 ft (36 m)
''Pajtás''		1917	Steamship	Hungary (TBD)	Hungary (TBD)	88.58 ft (27 m)
''Szőke Tisza''		1917	Steamship	Hungary (TBD)	Hungary (TBD)	253.94 ft (77.4 m)
Tarahne		1917	Passenger ferry	Canada (Atlin)	Canada (Atlin)	119.3 ft (36.3 m)
Valley Camp		1917	Lake freighter	United States (Lorain)	United States (Sault Ste. Marie)	550 ft (170 m)
Concrete Canal Boat		1918	Barge	United Kingdom (Stourbridge)	United Kingdom (Gloucester)	69.97 ft (21.33 m)
Felipe Larrazabal (R-11)		1918	Minesweeper	United States (New York City)	Venezuela (Puerto Cabello)	187 ft (57 m)
STS Kapitan Borchardt		1918	Schooner	Poland (Unknown)	Poland (Unknown)	138 ft (42 m)
Lotus		1918	Schooner	United States (Rocky River)	United States (Sodus Point)	60 ft (18 m)
Oosterschelde		1918	Schooner	—N/a	Netherlands (Rotterdam)	160 ft (48.7 m)
Robert and Ellen Robson		1918	Lifeboat	United Kingdom (Thames Ironworks and Shipbuilding Company)	United Kingdom (Whitby)	33.97 ft (10.35 m)
Seaplane Lighter H21		1918	Seaplane lighter	United Kingdom (Kent)	United Kingdom (Yeovilton)	57.97 ft (17.68 m)
Surprise		1918	Schooner	United States (Rockport)	United States (Camden)	44.5 ft (13.6 m)
W. P. Snyder Jr.		1918	Sternwheeler	United States (Pittsburgh)	United States (Marietta)	175 ft (53 m)

== Oldest surviving by category ==
The following is a list of ships arranged by category. These include ships that are the oldest in the world by type and by function, they do not include ships known only for being the last of their kind. The cutoff date as with the list are ships constructed before 1919.

=== By type ===
Oldest...	Name	Year of construction	Type
Warship	Mary Rose	1511	Carrack
Continuously maintained	Tarihi Kadırga	c.1600 (Note: Tarihi Kadırga was constructed in the late 16th or early 17th century)	Galley
Schooner	Peggy	1791	Armed yacht
Lifeboat	Zetland	1802	Rescue craft
Submarine	Brandtaucher	1850	Naval ship
Tugboat	Mayflower	1861	Steam tug
Clipper ship	City of Adelaide	1864	Sailing ship
Turbine-powered ship	Turbinia	1894	Experimental
Sternwheeler	Moyie	1898	Paddle steamer

=== By function ===
Oldest...	Name	Year of construction	Type
Commissioned naval vessel	HMS Victory (Note: Ceremonial role)	1765	Ship of the line
Commissioned naval vessel afloat	USS Constitution	1797	Frigate
Merchant ship	Charles W. Morgan	1841	Whaler
Ocean liner	SS Great Britain	1843	Passenger ship
Operational steamship	Bertha (Note: The Bertha is laid up (inactive))	1844	Dredge
Active steamship	Tudor Vladimirescu	1854	Paddle steamer (Note: The Tudor Vladimirescu is a "Sidewheeler" as opposed to the Moyie.)
Active sailing ship	Star of India	1863	Windjammer
Racing yacht	Partridge	1885	Yacht
Active fireboat	Edward M. Cotter	1900	Fireboat
Commissioned naval vessel in active service	Kommuna	1913	Salvage ship

== See also ==
- Museum ship
- List of museum ships
- List of ocean liners
- List of cruise ships
- List of schooners
- List of large sailing yachts
- List of surviving ancient ships
- List of clipper ships
- List of large sailing vessels
- List of ships
- Ships of ancient Rome
