= Dorothy (1891 tug) =

19th Century tugboat

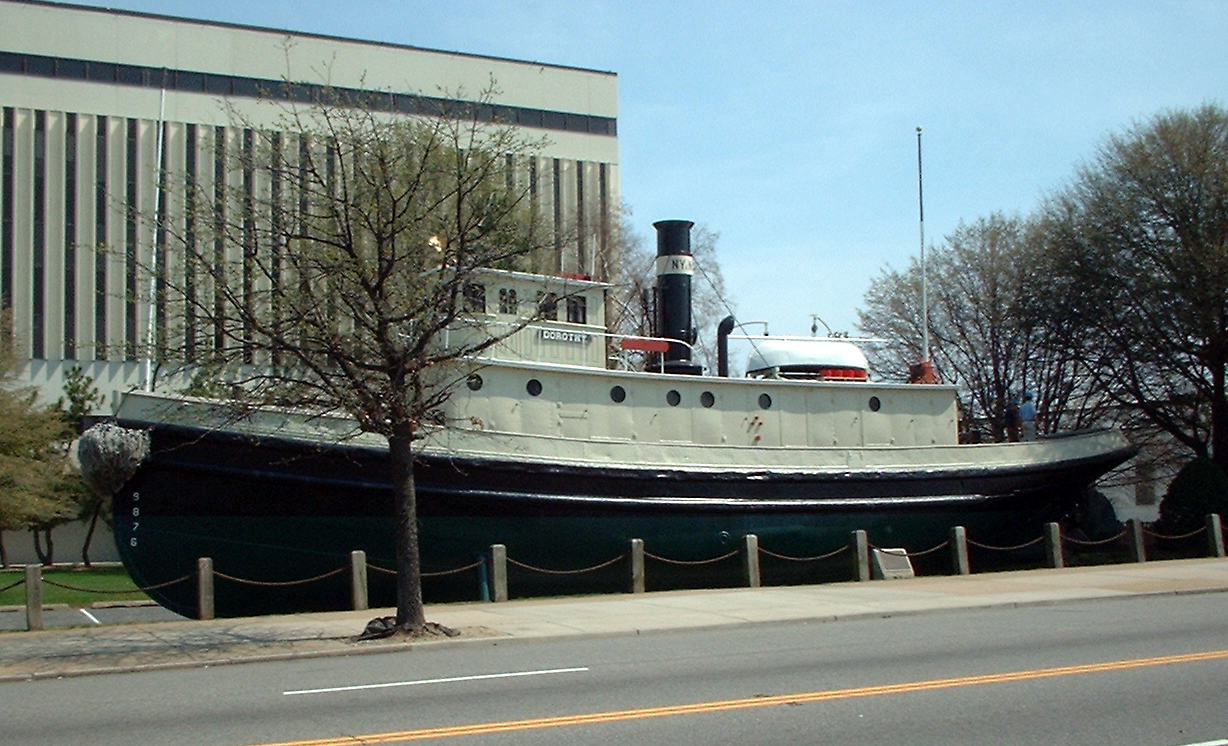
Photo of "Dorothy," c. 2007

Dorothy is a tugboat and the first ship constructed by the Newport News Shipbuilding and Dry Dock Company, currently on display in the yard. Dorothy is one of the oldest surviving ships in Virginia. She was built in 1890 and launched in 1891.

== History ==
The Dorothy was designed by Horace See and built in 1890 by the Newport News Shipbuilding and Dry Dock Company of Newport News, Virginia for Captain James P. Sheffield of Norfolk. The tugboat was named for Dorothy Whitney, the daughter of former Secretary of the Navy William C. Whitney.

She was a single screw 90-foot tugboat, rated at 400 horsepower. The tug was acquired by the New York Central Railroad Company where she was renamed the "New York Central No. 3" and used to push rail barges. She was later acquired by the Curtis Bay Towing Company of Baltimore, Maryland, where she was renamed the "J. Alvah Clark." In 1962, the tug was acquired by Eva Simkins and renamed the "Jesse Jr." After a 1964 collision, the tug was retired and returned to Newport News, where it was restored and is now preserved as a tribute to the shipbuilders of Newport News.
