= Lagaren (ship) =

Historic Swedish ship

Coordinates: 28°27′53.30″N 16°14′43.39″W

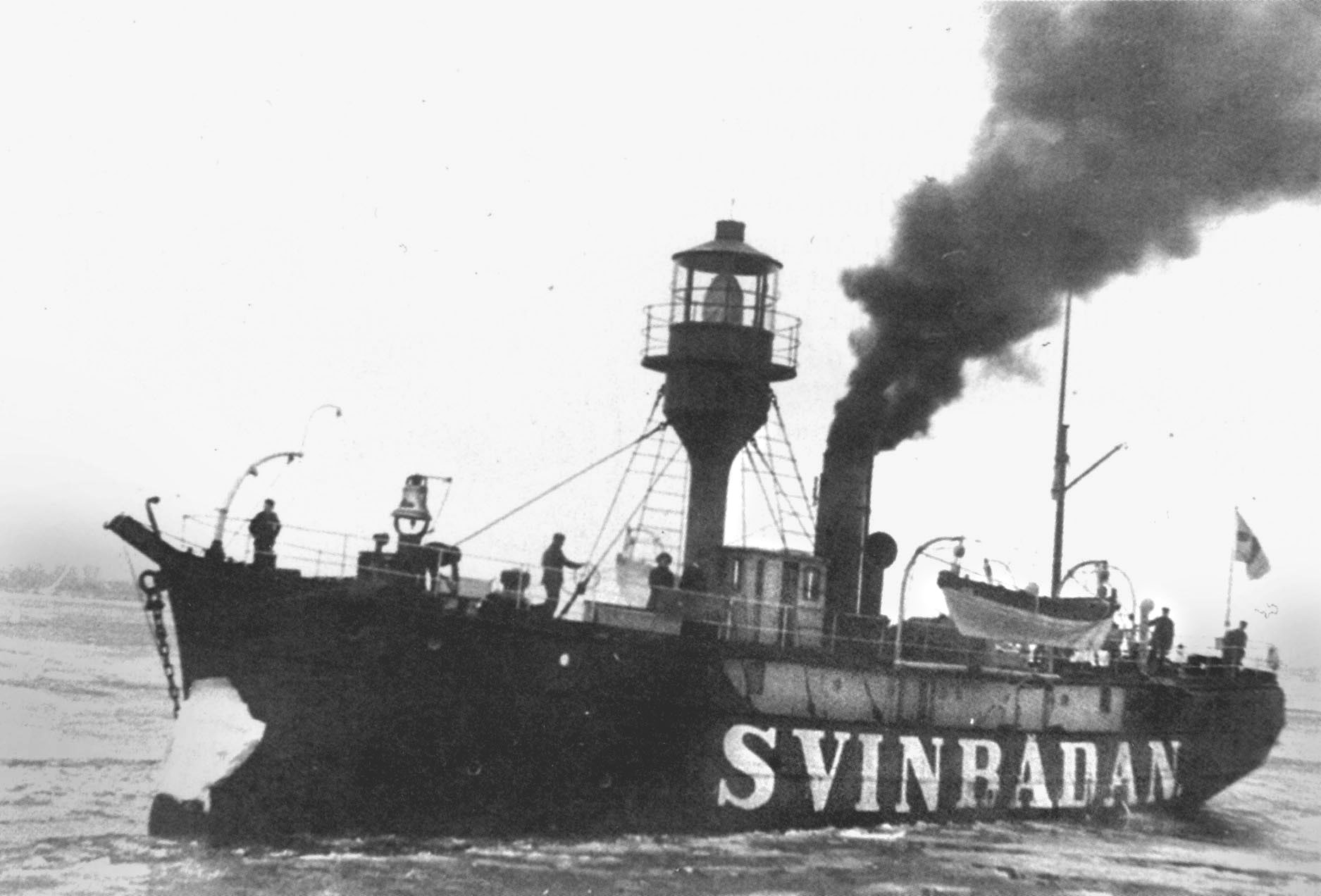
- Lagaren during its time as the light-vessel No. 17 Svinbådan

History

Sweden
- Name: No. 17 Svinbådan
- Builder: G W Lindbergs Verkstad, Stockholm, Sweden
- Laid down: 1893
- Launched: 1894
- Renamed: Lagaren in 1960
- Reclassified: Schoolship in 1972
- Fate: Sold to an American buyer in December 2009

United States
- Name: Lagaren
- In service: 2010
- Fate: Impounded in Santa Cruz, Tenerife in 2013

General characteristics
- Type: Private schooner rigged motorship (Currently); Steamship, Lightvessel (Formerly)
- Length: 34.65 m
- Beam: 6.7 m
- Draft: 3.1 m
- Propulsion: eight-cylinder Scania DSI14 diesel engine (Currently); 125 hp steam engine (As built)
- Complement: 8 crew

Lagaren is a historic iron-hulled ship that formerly served as the Swedish lightvessel steamship No. 17 Svinbådan and was subsequently used as a workshop vessel and a schoolship. In 2010 the ship was flagged in the United States and since 2013 has been impounded in Santa Cruz, Tenerife in relation to a drug smuggling case.

== History ==
Built by W. Lindbergs Varvs- och Verkstads AB between 1893 and 1894 the Lagaren was launched in 1894 as the lightship No. 17 Svinbådan for the Swedish Pilot Office. She served at the northern entrance to Öresund in that role until 1960 when she had her engine removed at the Kalmar dockyards and was reclassified as a workshop vessel with the name Lagaren. The refitted ship served as a service vessel for survey ships. Between 1968 and 1972 the ship itself was used for hydrographic survey work. The Skeppsholmsgården foundation bought the ship in 1972 and rigged her as a sailing vessel with a schooner rig with the intention of using her as a schoolship. She was drydocked at Beckholmen in 1992 and outfitted with a bow propeller to increase maneuverability. In 1995 Skeppsholmsgården added a diesel engine to the ship, allowing her to once again become a primarily motor-powered vessel. The ship was a filming location for the Swedish crime thriller TV-series Graven (2004).

In late 2009 the foundation sold the ship to an American buyer. The new owner moved the ship to Portsmouth for refit and to Harlingen for re-rigging in 2010. The ship came to the attention of local media in the Canary Islands when police detained the vessel and arrested the crew in 2013 due to its involvement with an operation to ship cocaine from Cape Verde to the Canary Islands. The ship has remained in Santa Cruz de Tenerife ever since.

== See also ==
List of oldest surviving ships
