= SS Salama =

Finnish cargo and passenger ship, museum

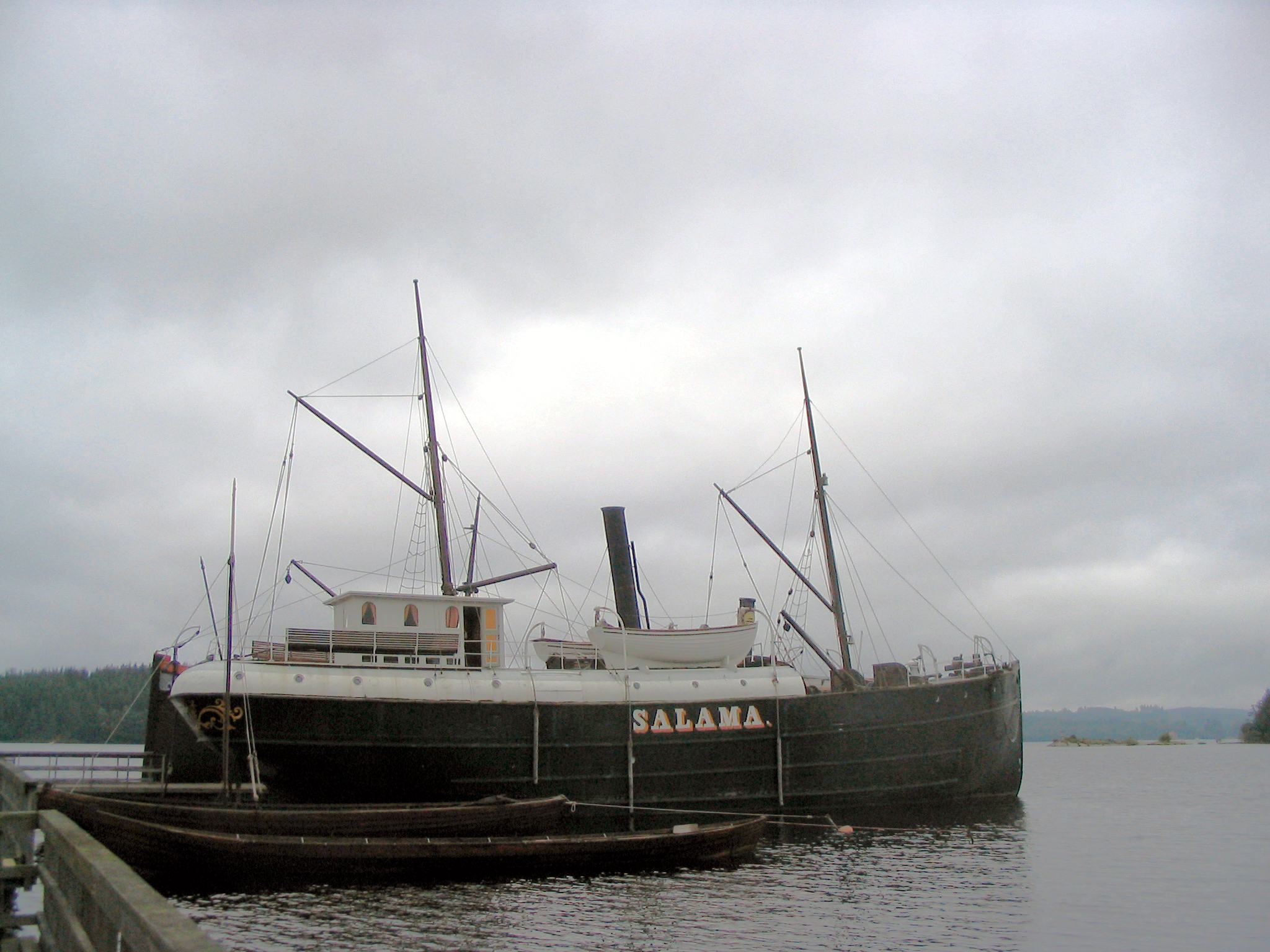
- SS Salama in her berth outside Savonlinna Museum

History
- Name: Salama
- Owner: 1874: Savonlinnan Höyrylaiva Osakeyhtiö; 1985: Savonlinna museum
- Route: Joensuu–Savonlinna–Viipuri–Pietari
- Builder: Viipurin konepaja
- Completed: 1874
- Fate: Sank in a collision near Puumala, 13 September 1898
- Status: Raised in 1971, museum ship since 1985

General characteristics
- Type: Steam schooner
- Length: 31.42 m (103.1 ft) p/p
- Beam: 6.7 m (22 ft)
- Depth: 244 m (801 ft)
- Speed: 7.5 knots (13.9 km/h) (1874-1898)
- Capacity: as built: 12 passengers; 1883-1898: 60 passengers

Steam schooner Salama is a Finnish cargo and passenger ship that sank in 1898, was raised in 1971, and is now open to the public as a museum ship. The word "salama" is Finnish for lightning.

The vessel was built in 1874 by the Vyborg machine shop in the Grand Duchy of Finland for the Savonlinnan Höyrylaiva Osakeyhtiö (Savonlinna steam ship company). She was originally equipped with both a steam engine and auxiliary sails. She mainly operated on inland waterways of lake Saimaa and coastal waters of the Gulf of Finland on the route Joensuu - Savonlinna - Lappeenranta - Vyborg - Saint Petersburg carrying both cargo and passengers. In addition, the ship made a number of voyages across the Baltic Sea to Lübeck. The vessel was built for only 12 passengers, but after her 1883 refit, she could carry 60 people in a lounge and dining room.

On the night of 13 September 1898, SS Salama was traversing a narrow waterway near Puumala while returning from Saint Petersburg towards Savonlinna when she collided with the passenger ship SS Ilmari. The collision tore a hole in the starboard side of Salama's hull, and she sank half an hour later with her cargo of rye. The tugboat Ahkera happened to be nearby and managed to rescue all of Salama's passengers and crew.

In 1970, the shipwreck was discovered by chance when Salama's mast was caught in a passing tugboat's wire. In the summer of 1971, 73 years after the sinking, the wreck was raised in a project funded by the forest industry company Enso-Gutzeit. Having been well preserved by the freshwater conditions, SS Salama was restored and the hole in her hull was repaired. In 1985, she was donated to the City of Savonlinna to be opened as a museum ship. As of 2024, she is afloat, but as her steam engine has not been restored, she is permanently moored outside the Savonlinna Museum in Riihisaari. The tugboat SS Ahkera that rescued her passengers during her sinking can be seen at the same pier. (Note: Built 1870-1871, the tugboat SS Ahkera is the oldest steam vessel in Finland. Other museum ships normally found at the same pier include the passenger ship SS Savonlinna and the tar steamer SS Mikko. All three ships still run under their own power.)
