= Utrecht ship =

Tenth-century cargo ship

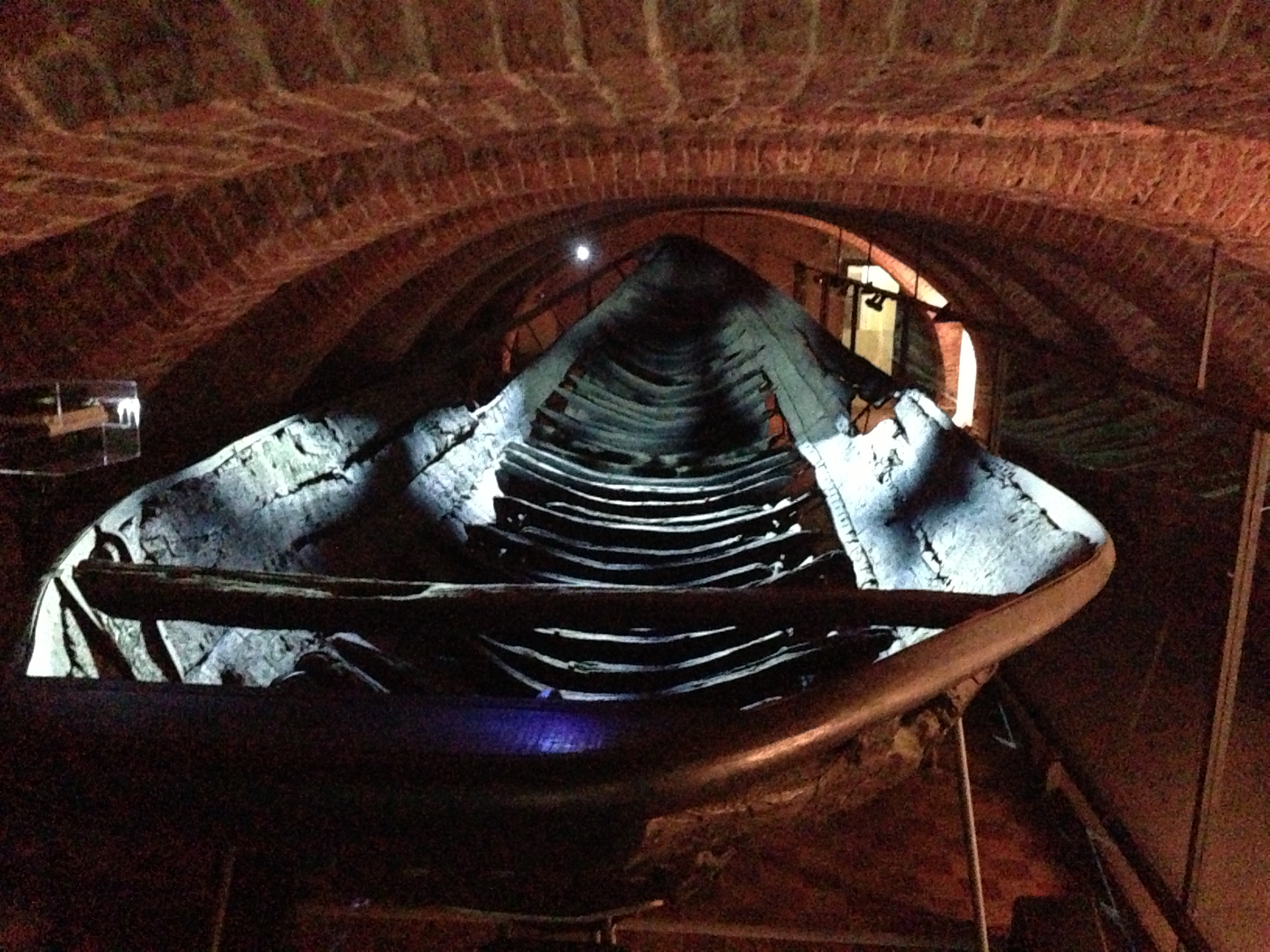
- The Utrecht ship at the Centraal Museum in Utrecht, Netherlands

History
- Name: Utrecht ship
- Completed: 997-1030
- Fate: Museum ship

General characteristics
- Type: Cargo ship
- Length: 17.8 metres (58 ft)
- Beam: 3.8 m (12 ft)
- Draft: 0.7 metres (2.3 ft)
- Propulsion: Sail

The Utrecht ship is a tenth-century cargo ship found during excavation works at the Van Hoornekade in Northern Utrecht, Netherlands, in 1930. It is displayed at the Centraal Museum in Utrecht, Netherlands.

== Construction ==
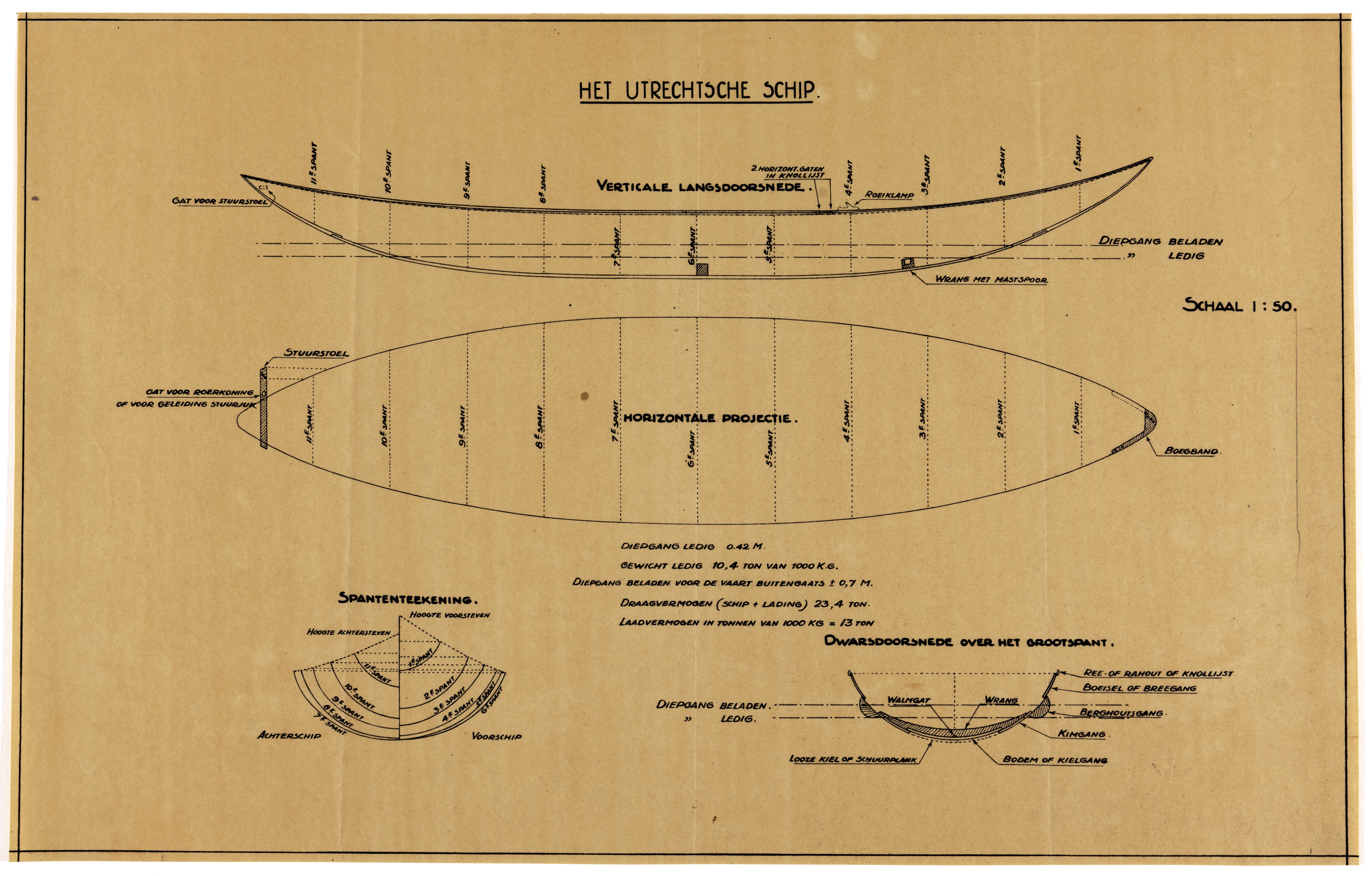
Drawing of the ship's layout.

The Utrecht ship was constructed between 997 and 1030 in the Netherlands of a local oak tree, which was carved out to make the bottom of the ship. An array of planks and beams were afterwards added to the ship to create the hull. The ship is 17.8 metres (58 ft) long, 3.8 m (12 ft) wide and had a draft of 0.7 metres (2.3 ft). She could carry about 13 tons of cargo.

The ship was most likely constructed to serve as a cargo ship and sailed along the Rhine from Utrecht to settlements alongside the river.

== Discovery ==
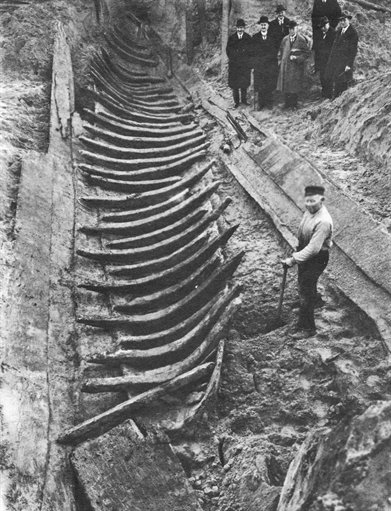
Discovery of the ship in 1930.

The remains of the ship were found during excavation works at the Van Hoornekade in Northern Utrecht, Netherlands, on 3 December 1930. Those who had initially discovered her believed the wreck to be that of a Roman ship, but after the use of tree-ring dating in the late 1950s, it was determined the ship was much younger, dating back to the 10th century.

The director of the Centraal Museum dr. W.C. Schuylenburg, decided to preserve the ship and had the wreck be taken to the museum by use of a specially constructed train rail and by ship across the river Vecht. The ship was brought to the basement of the museum, for which they had to demolish a part of the exterior walls of the building to fit the ship inside.

After initial examinations by researchers from across the globe, dr. Schuylenburg decided to conserve the ship by treating the wreck with a mixture of carbolineum and linseed oil, which can still be smelled on the ship to this day. A ship building company reconstructed the ship after its treatment.

== Public exhibition ==
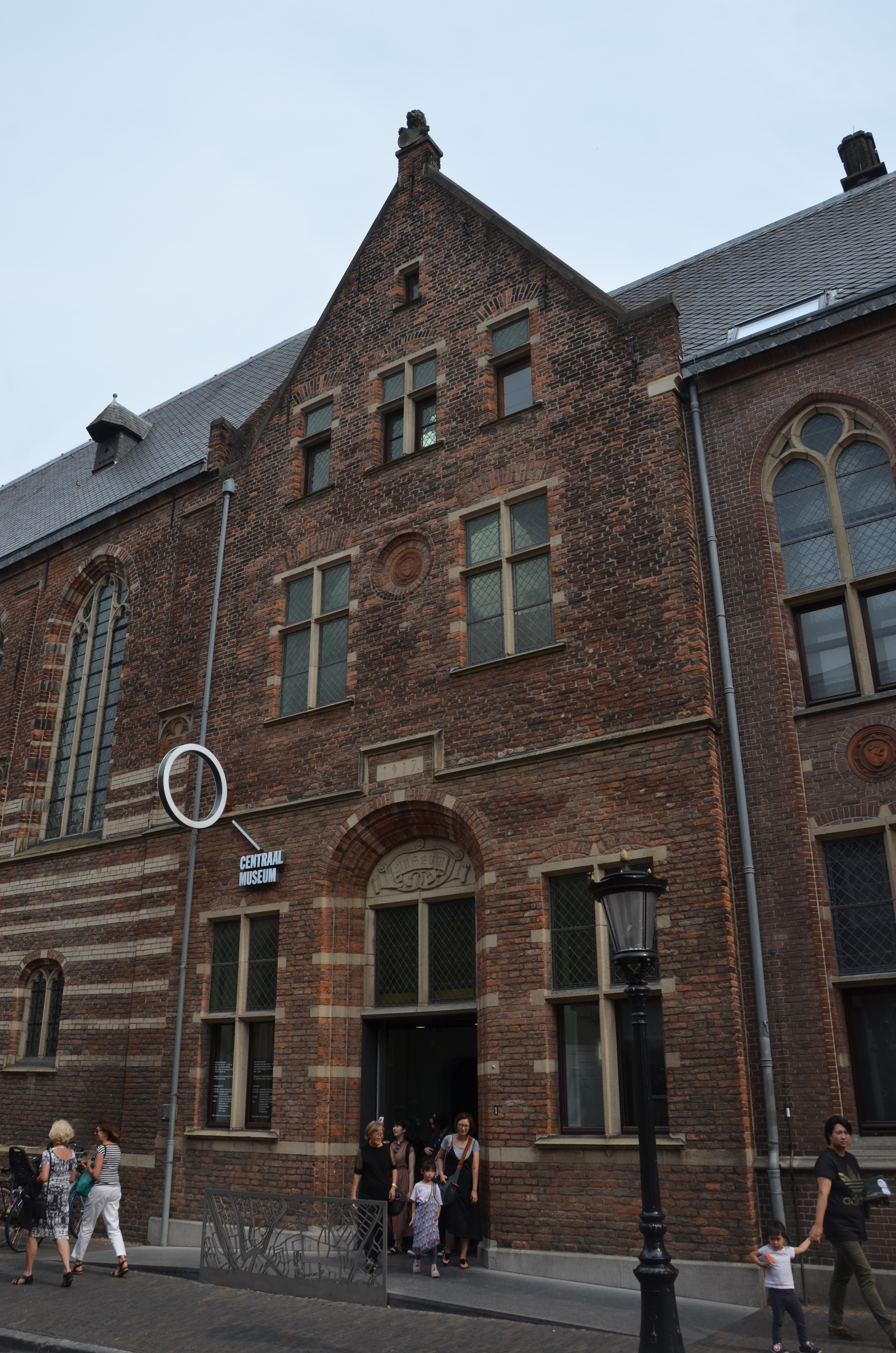
Centraal Museum in Utrecht.

The ship has been on display to the public at the Centraal Museum in Utrecht, Netherlands, since 1936.
