= Gurli =

Gurli is a Scandinavian given name for females. Notable people named Gurli include:

- Gurli Ewerlund (1902–1985), Swedish swimmer
- Gurli Vibe Jensen (1924–2016), Danish missionary, priest and writer
- Gurli Linder (1865–1947), Swedish writer
- Gurli Åberg (1843–1922), Swedish actress

See also:

- Gwili Andre (1907–1959), Danish model and actress, born Gurli Andresen
