= L'Almée (ship) =

Yacht built 1886

Coordinates: 45.7057°N 5.8857°E

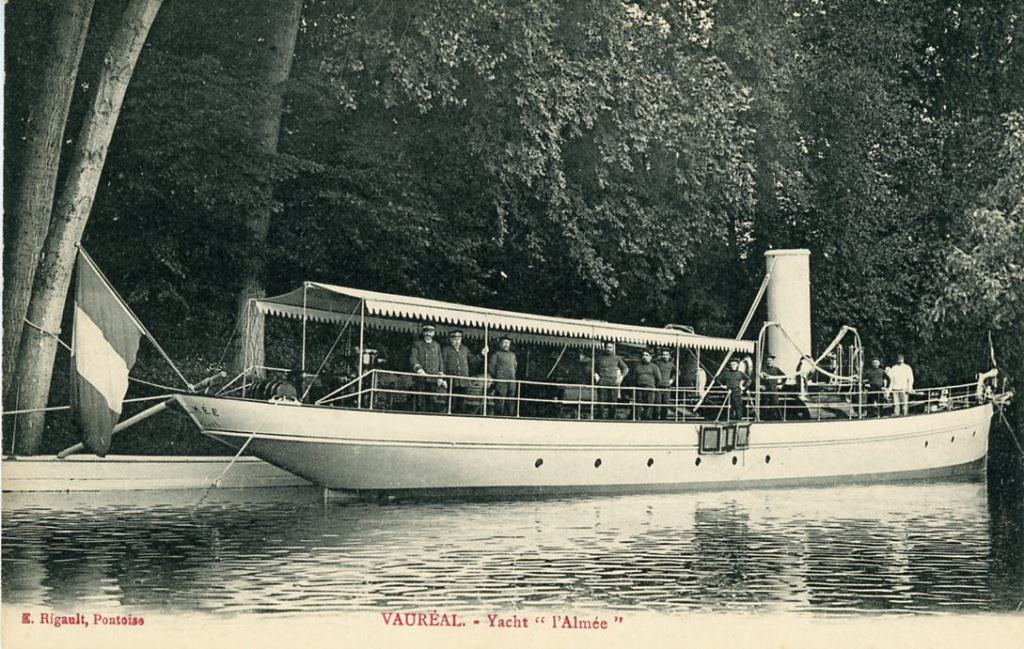
- L'Almée in Vauréal

History

France
- Name: L'Almée
- Owner: Henri Menier (1887–1913); Domaines de l'État (1913–1927); Compagnie de Navigation du Lac (1927–1945); Société de l'Étoile du Lac (1945–1970); Daniel Carraz (1970–1976); Compagnie des Bateaux du lac du Bourget et du Haut-Rhône (since 1976)
- Operator: Marine nationale (1914–1918)
- Builder: Chantiers de la Seine, Argenteuil (France)
- Launched: May 10, 1887
- Christened: September 9, 1888
- In service: 1888
- Out of service: 1970
- Renamed: Hautecombe (1947–1970)
- Refit: 1945
- Homeport: Le Havre (1888–1927); Aix-les-Bains (since 1927)
- Fate: Transformed as maritime store at Aix-les-Bains

General characteristics
- Displacement: 100 tonnes
- Length: 27 metres (89 ft)
- Propulsion: Two steam turbines

L'Almée is a yacht built in 1886 by the Chantiers de la Seine of Argenteuil. She is now a maritime store at Aix-les-Bains, on the Lac du Bourget.

== Ship history ==
L'Almée is a yacht built in 1886 by the Chantiers de la Seine of Argenteuil for Henri Menier, a French chocolate-maker, who had drawn its plans. The ship was launched on May 10, 1887.

On October 24, 1893, during an official visit to Paris, Counter admiral and baron Jean Théobald Lagé, president of the Union des yachts français, gave counter admiral Theodor Avellan, major of the Russian Squadron in the Mediterranean Sea, a diploma of honorary member of the Union and a commemorative gold medal on board the yacht.

On September 6, 1913, Henri Menier died and his yacht was laid up on the Oise. The next year, World War I began and the L'Almée was requisitioned by the Marine Nationale. It was used as a patrol boat until the end of the war when it came back to the Oise. It was bought by the Domaines de l'État and moored on the Marne. In 1926, it was bought by the Compagnie de Navigation du Lac, jointly managed by Michel Clappier and Félix Bal, and brought to the Lac du Bourget. In 1929, Michel Clappier became the only manager of the company and Félix Bal created a competing company in 1930, the Société Nouvelle de Navigation – Les cygnes du Lac.

L'Almée was then used as a barge to transport wood or was aground in Memard Bay (North West of Aix-les-Bains). During the Second World War, it stayed aground in this bay (located only some meters away from its current location). It was plundered during the conflict.

At the end of the war, it was bought by the Société de l'Étoile du Lac and transformed into a ferry-boat. It was renamed Hautecombe and, in 1947, it began its crossings between Aix-les-Bains and Hautecombe Abbey, alternating with the ferry La Savoie.

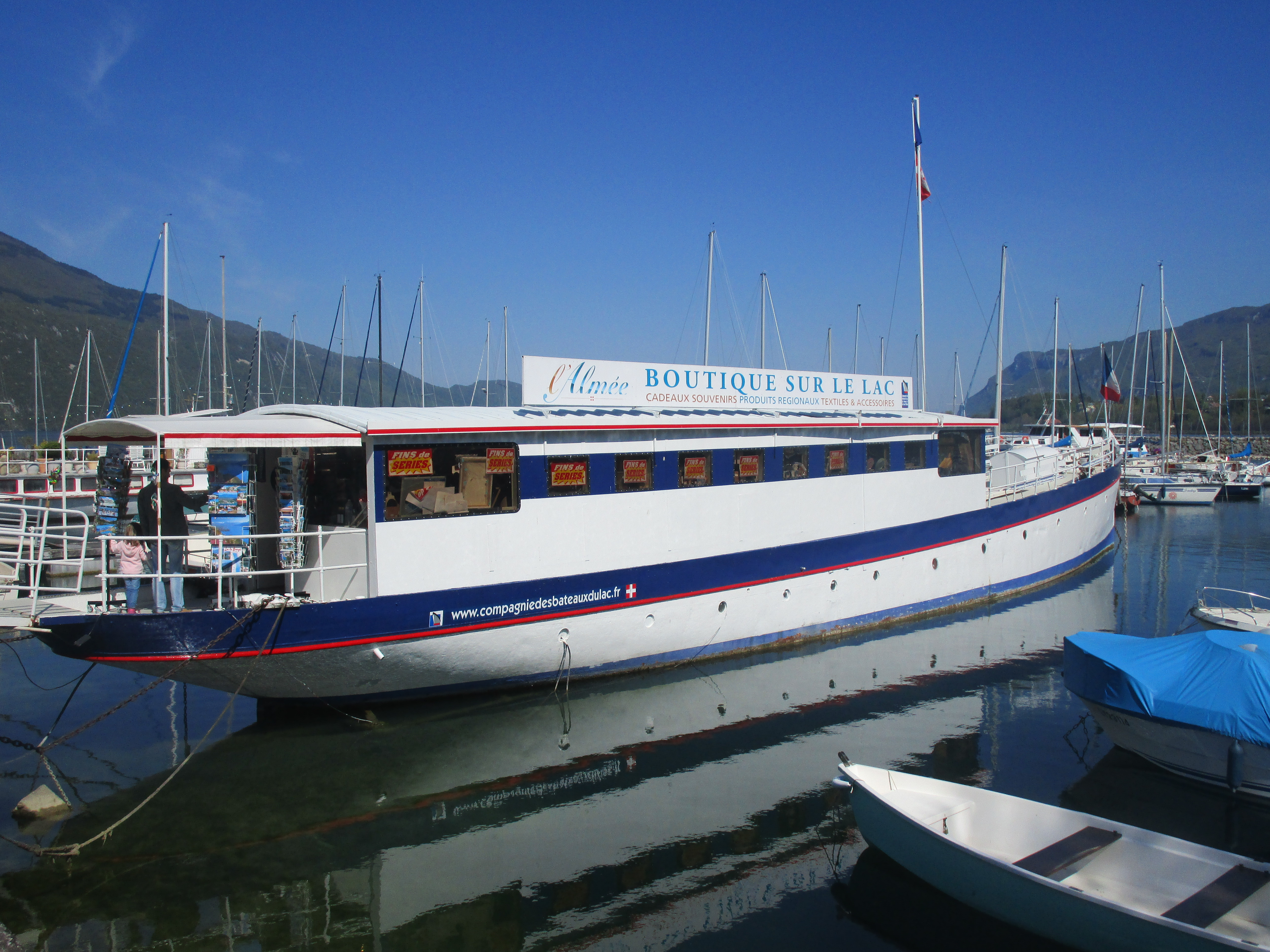
The maritime store L'Almée in April 2015.

On August 18, 1969, the cruise ship La Fraidieu sunk near Ripaille Castle, then the ship Sainte-Odile capsized on August 7, 1970, near Yvoire. In total, the sinking of these ships killed 31 people; 24 in the first shipwreck and 7 in the second. To avoid new tragedies, the freshwater navigation rules were reinforced. Due to these new regulations, the Hautecombe had to be retired from service, that was done in September 1970. Daniel Carraz bought it and removed the motors, then used it as storage facility.

In 1976, Alain Prud'homme bought the ferry Hautecombe and used it as headquarters for his sailing school. The ship took back its original name and was moored at the Grand Port of Aix-les-Bains, near the docks for the company's ships . It was later converted into a maritime store. On February 8, 2015, it dragged its anchor and a part of its gangway was snatched due to strong winds. The ship was not damaged and the gangway was repaired some days later.

== Annexes ==
=== Linked articles ===
- Lac du Bourget
- Aix-les-Bains

=== External links ===
- "Le yacht Almée". Saga Menier.
- "Almée – Yacht". Pages 14–18. Archived from the original on February 15, 2015.

=== Bibliography ===
- Frieh-Giraud, Geneviève (2002). La Navigation sur le Lac du Bourget – Des origines à nos jours. Aix-les-Bains: GWEL. pp. 82–83. ISBN 2-9519241-0-0.
- Société d'Art et d'Histoire (1998). Le Lac du Bourget – Photographies 1870–1970. Lyon: Chirat. pp. 43–47. ISBN 2-908214-06-7.
- Pallière, Johannès (2003). Le Lac du Bourget – Lac majeur de France. Montmélian: La fontaine de Siloé. pp. 344–350. ISBN 2-84206-234-5.
- Billiez, Henri (June 1997). "L'Almée : le plus vieux bateau de nos lacs". Arts et Mémoire (8). Société d'Art et d'Histoire: 42–47.
