= Wäiski =

Restaurant ship in Helsinki, Finland

Coordinates: 60°10′39.47″N 24°57′29.64″E

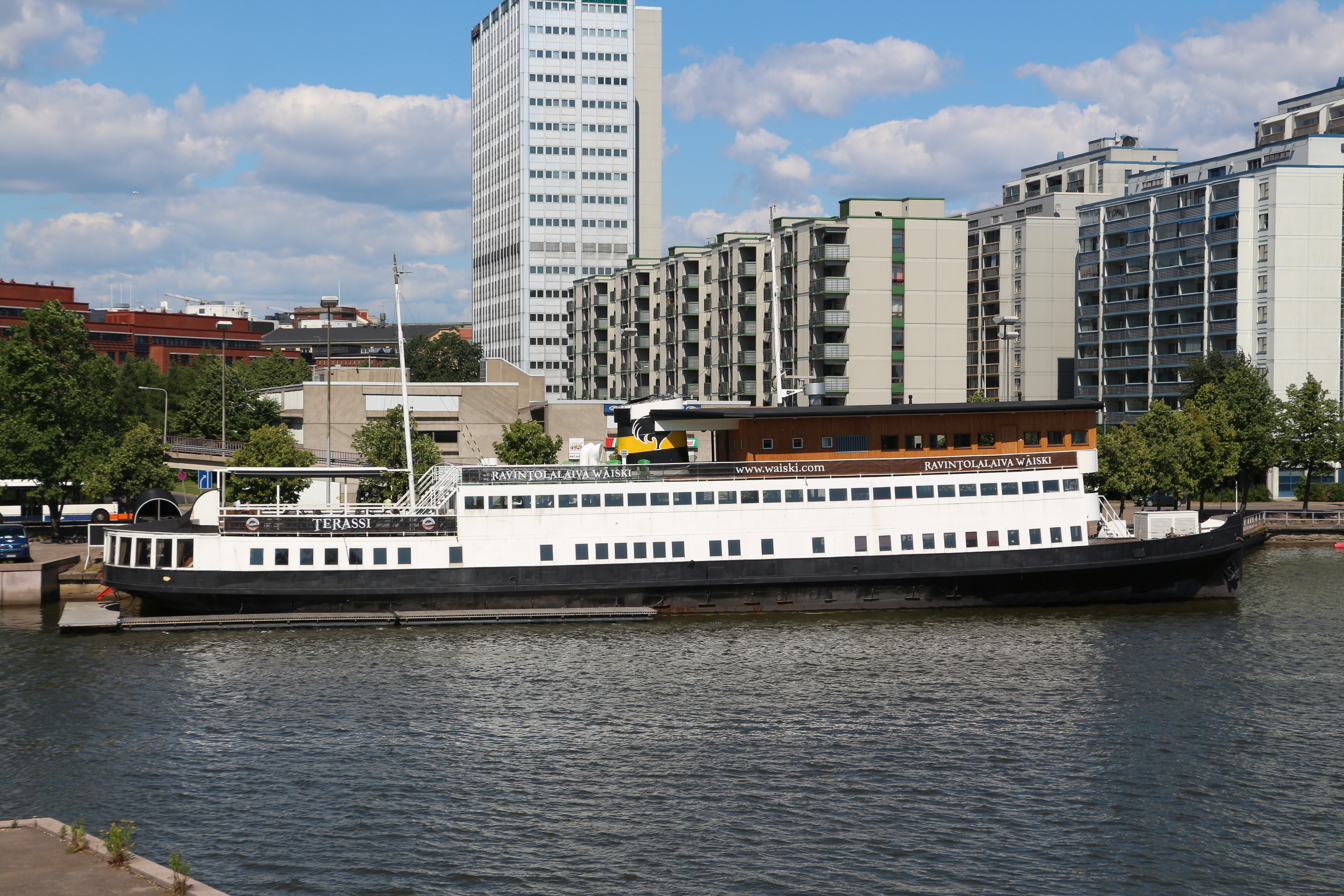
Restaurant ship Wäiski

Wäiski is a restaurant ship located in Punavuori, Helsinki, Finland.

== History ==
The ship has had a long history. The steam ship Wäiski was originally built in 1911 in Germany as the passenger ship Oldenburg. It was later resold and renamed many times. In 1967, it was sold to Oskarshamn, Sweden.

In 1989, it was sold to Naantali, Finland, and in 1999, it finally settled in Merihaka.
