= Bustardthorpe =

Flat-bottomed barge constructed in 1914

History

United Kingdom
- Name: Bustardthorpe
- Owner: TF Woods & Co
- Operator: TF Woods & Co
- Route: Between York and the towns of Hull and Goole
- Builder: JS Watson of Gainsborough
- Completed: 1914
- Status: Converted to a privately owned houseboat

General characteristics
- Class & type: Lighter
- Tonnage: 98.22 gross tons
- Length: 91.93 ft (28.02 m) overall
- Beam: 17.08 ft (5.21 m)
- Depth: 6.89 feet (2.10 metres)
- Installed power: Inboard motor
- Capacity: 120 tons

Bustardthorpe, now known as Miranda Mayne, is a privately owned steel lighter, based on the River Thames at Abingdon. She is on the National Register of Historic Vessels, but is not a part of the National Historic Fleet.

Bustardthorpe was originally constructed as an unpowered barge by Joseph Spencer Watson for T F Woods & Co. Constructed of riveted Swedish rolled steel and fitted with a tiller and open wheelhouse, she was completed in 1914. She was initially paired with the steam towing barge Ouse, and made regular trips between York and the towns of Hull and Goole. During her time with T F Woods & Co, she carried up to 120 tons of Swedish pulped paper rolls, destined for use by the Yorkshire Herald. She also transported bagged cocoa beans, sugar, hazelnuts and gum to Wormald Cut on the River Foss for the confectionery company Rowntrees.

In 1931, Bustardthorpe was fitted with a 75kW Lister JP6 diesel engine, and was registered as a motor vessel.

== Collisions at Castle Mill Lock ==
In 1949, Bustardthorpe's reverse gear failed while travelling down the River Foss, and she crashed into the lower gates of Castle Mill Lock, damaging the gates. She was then sold in 1957 to the Dry Pool Engineering and Dry Dock Company, and the following year was sold again to William Gilyott & Co Ltd of Hull. In 1959, again at Castle Mill Lock, her engine overheated and she lost control. She caused £60 of damage to the pumphouse suction pipe after colliding with it.
