= Little Jennie (bugeye) =

- Little Jennie (Chesapeake Bay bugeye)
- U.S. National Register of Historic Places
- Location within New York Location within the United States
- Location: Centerport Harbor, Centerport, New York
- Coordinates: 40°53′36″N 73°22′28″W
- Built: 1884
- Architect: J.T. Marsh
- Architectural style: Chesapeake Bay bugeye
- NRHP reference No.: 86001081
- Added to NRHP: May 12, 1986

The Little Jennie is a Chesapeake Bay bugeye built in 1884 and designed by J.T. Marsh of Solomons, Maryland. She is homeported at Centerport, Suffolk County, New York. Her hull is 54 feet in length at the waterline, her beam is 15.6 feet, and her draft is 3.5 feet. She was restored between 1976 and 1985.

She was listed on the National Register of Historic Places in 1986.
