= Ethel von Brixham =

Sailing vessel in service 1890–2026

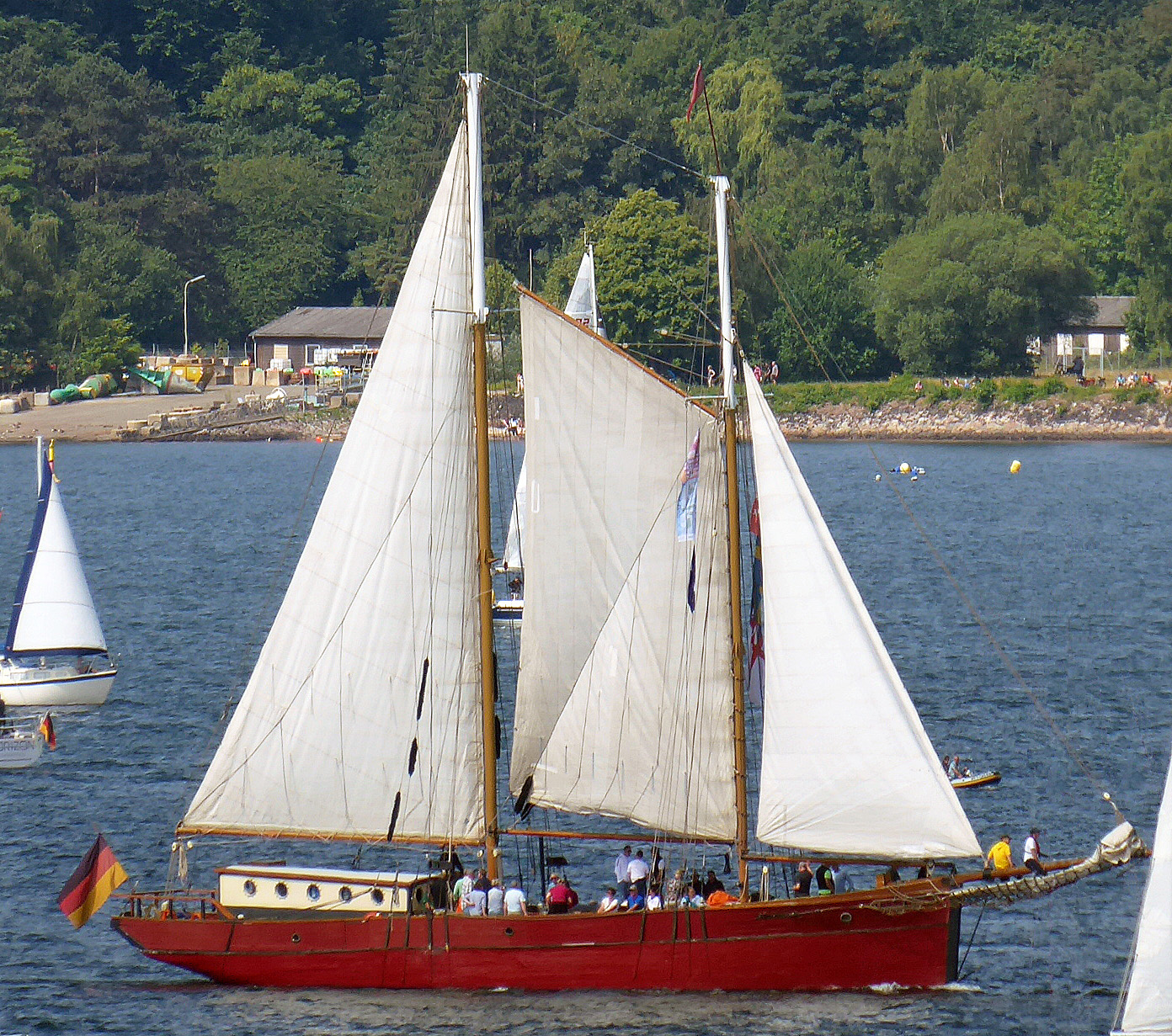
- Ethel von Brixham in 2023

History

United Kingdom
- Name: Ethel von Brixham
- Namesake: Brixham
- Builder: J. W. & A. Upham, Brixham, Devon, England
- Launched: 1890
- Renamed: Salvøy; Bass; Lønning; Ethel; Ethel von Brixham
- Home port: Kiel, Germany (1986–2024)
- Identification: Callsign: DJTA
- Status: Broken up after grounding and salvage failure in 2026

General characteristics
- Class & type: Brixham trawler; later rebuilt as a two-masted schooner/traditional sailing vessel
- Tons burthen: 49 gross tons
- Length: 95.14 ft (29.00 m) overall
- Beam: 16.40 ft (5.00 m)
- Draft: 2.90 m (9.5 ft)
- Depth: 6.56 ft (2.00 m)
- Propulsion: sail; 1 diesel engine
- Sail plan: two-masted schooner

Ethel von Brixham was a Brixham trawler built in 1890 in Brixham, Devon, England, the oldest Brixham trawler in the world before her loss in 2026. Later rebuilt and operated in Germany as a sailing vessel, she was sold in 2025 for planned restoration in the United Kingdom after passing through British, Scandinavian, and German ownership. On 31 January 2026, during her transportation back to the UK, she ran aground off Cuxhaven, Germany and subsequently broke in two during salvage operations in February 2026.

== History ==
Ethel von Brixham was built in 1890 by J. W. & A. Upham in Brixham, and was originally named Lily & Ethel. She was built as a wooden sailing Brixham trawler.

For her first years she worked from Lowestoft in the North Sea fisheries. In 1906 she was sold to Sweden and later operated in Norway, where she was used for fishing and, subsequently, as a cargo vessel under a series of names including Salvøy. By 1927 she had been acquired by the Sævlandsvik Partrederi of Kopervik, Norway, and continued in Norwegian service for decades.

By 1981 the vessel had arrived in Germany, where owners Eckhard Clemens and Annette Pipahl began converting her from a motor vessel into an oceangoing staysail schooner. Registered in Kiel from 1986 to 2024, she was used in the Baltic for day trips, weekend voyages, and longer sail-training and charter cruises. German tall-ship directories listed her as about 30 m (98 ft) overall, with a sail area of about 400 m^{2} (4,300 sq ft).

In 2011, the rig was altered to resemble more closely that of an original Brixham trawler. The high mainsail was retained, while the fisherman and staysail between the masts were replaced by a gaff sail, and the jib was reduced in size and set as a boom jib.

Ethel von Brixham also appeared in film productions. National Historic Ships UK records her appearance in the German-language adaptation of Günter Grass's The Rat and, later, in Guy Ritchie's 2024 film The Ministry of Ungentlemanly Warfare.

After her German safety certificate expired in September 2024, her owners offered the ship for sale, stating that they could not afford the cost of modifications required under new safety regulations. She was sold in 2025 and then sold again in November 2025 to a British owner who intended to bring her back to the United Kingdom for full restoration.

=== Loss ===
On 31 January 2026, while on passage from Brunsbüttel to Den Helder, Ethel von Brixham ran aground on a breakwater near buoy 29 off Cuxhaven, about 1.4 nautical miles from the Kugelbake. Attempts to refloat were unsuccessful, and crew members had to leave the vessel, assisted by the crew of another boat, after they reported water ingress and bilge pump failures. In mid-February 2026 she was lifted by floating crane during a wreck-removal operation, but the wooden hull broke in two, ending any prospect of restoration.

== Gallery ==
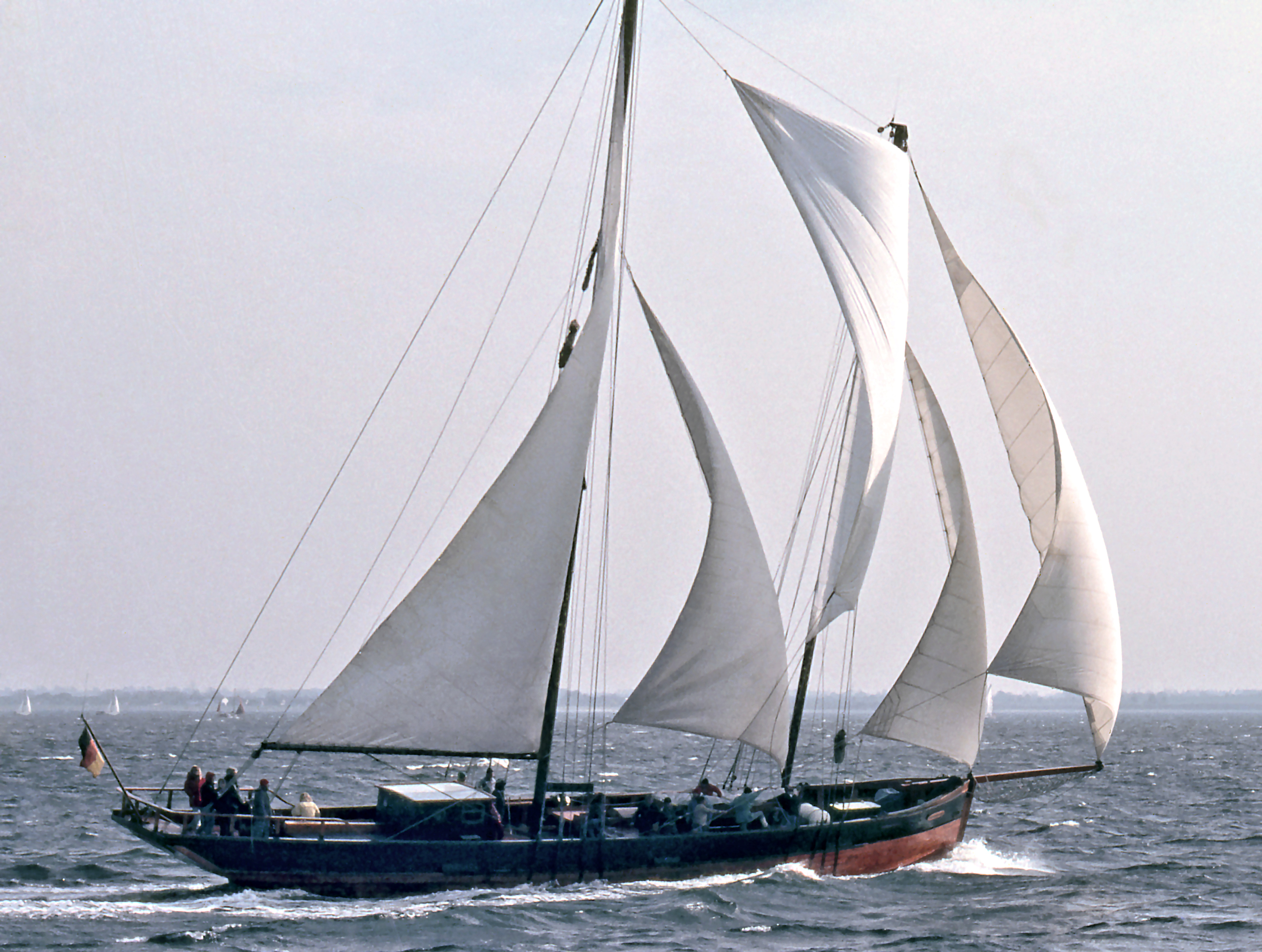
Under sail in 1987

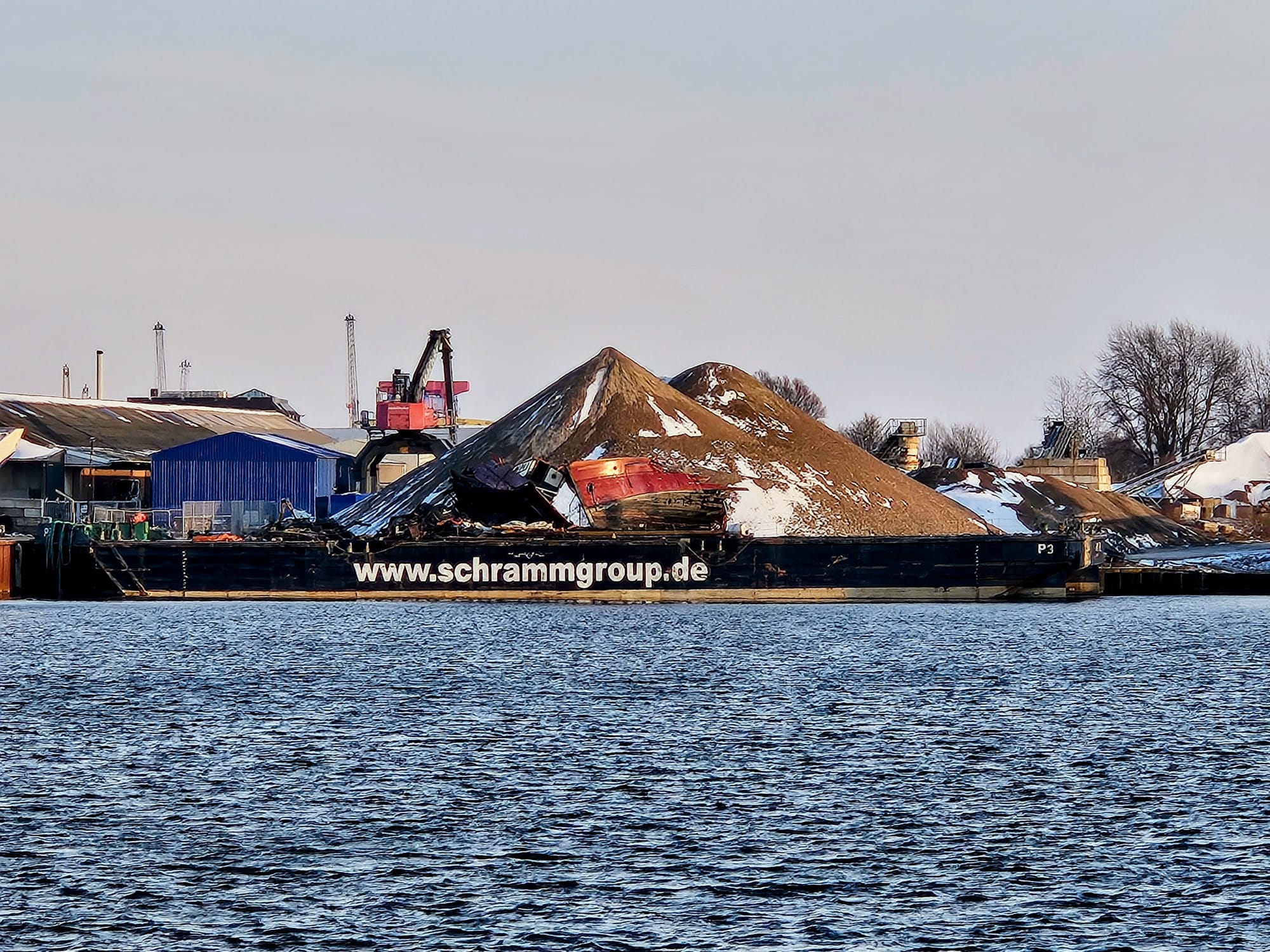
After salvage failure in 2026
