= ASPO =

ASPO or Aspo may refer to:

== Places ==
- Aspö Islands, a group of islands in the Pargas municipality of southern Finland
  - Aspö, a village on the islands
- Aspö, Karlskrona, an island outside Karlskrona, Sweden

== Organisations ==
- American Society of Preventive Oncology, a multidisciplinary learned society dedicated to cancer prevention
- American Society for Psychoprophylaxis in Obstetrics, now known as Lamaze International
- Association of the Scouts of the Penza Oblast (Ассоциация Скаутов Пензенской области), Scouting in Russia
- Association for the Study of Peak Oil, researchers on Peak oil
- Army Space Program Office, United States Army Space and Missile Defense Command
- Apollo Spacecraft Program Office, NASA
- Aspo (company), Finland (fi:Aspo)
- ASPO Tours, French basketball club (fr:ASPO Tours (basket-ball))
- Äspö Hard Rock Laboratory, Sweden

== Entertainment ==
- About Some Precioux Oldies, French band which has toured with Alton Ellis
