= Långa Soffan =

Bench in Oskarshamn, Sweden

Coordinates: 57.264704°N 16.454166°E

Långa Soffan (literally the Long Sofa) is a 72 meters (about 240 ft) long wooden park bench, located in the harbor area of Oskarshamn in Sweden.

== History ==
The bench was constructed in 1867 along with the terrace on which it stands. It is situated along the street of Skeppsbron on the south side of the harbor, just below the old City Hall in Oskarshamn. The bench measures 72 meters and is regarded as one of the longest wooden benches still existing from the 19th century. Historically it was used by wives of sailors, who awaited their husbands to return from sea. From the bench there is a view over the port of Oskarshamn and the surrounding waters.

== Gallery ==
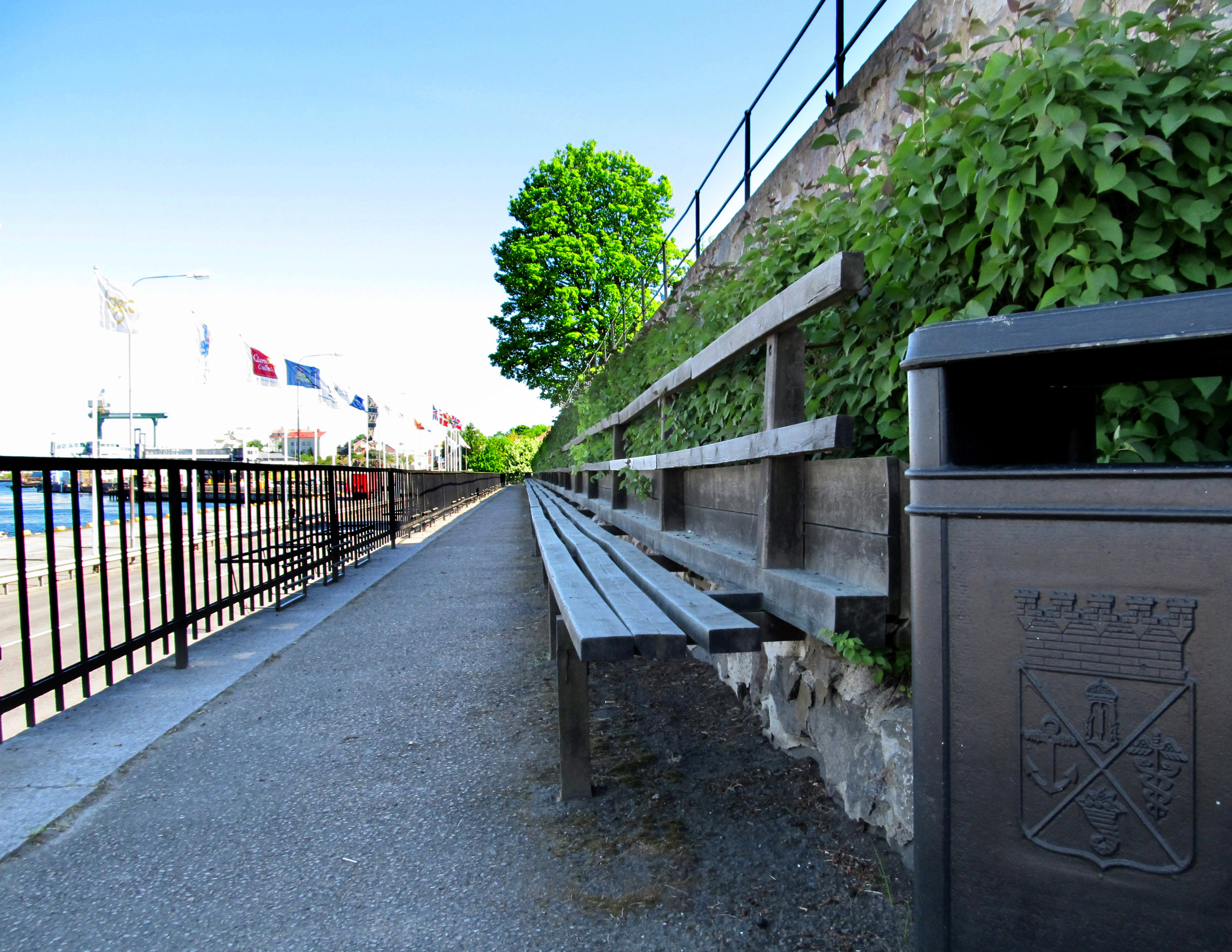
Långa Soffan in 2012.

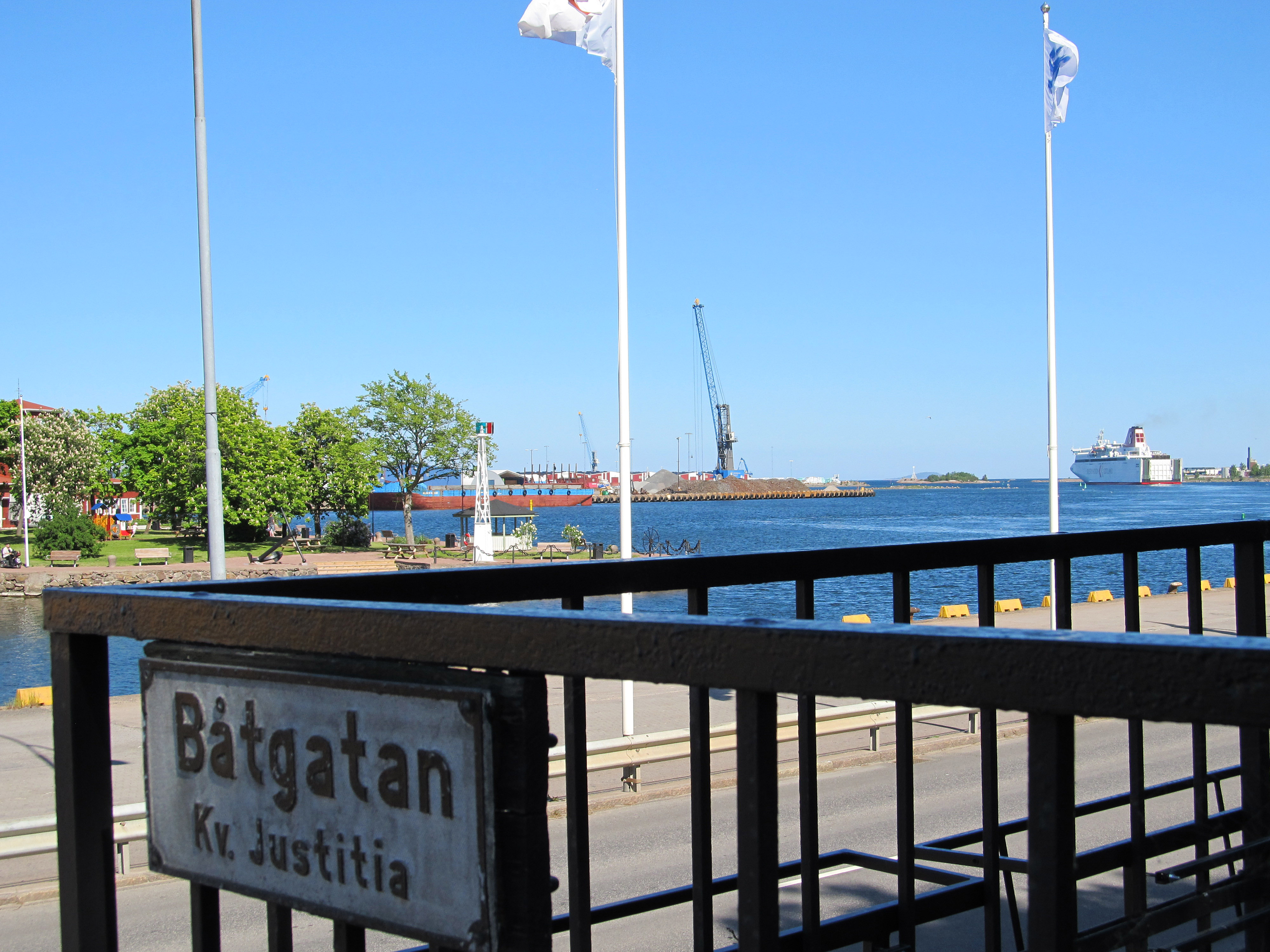
Western part of the terrace.

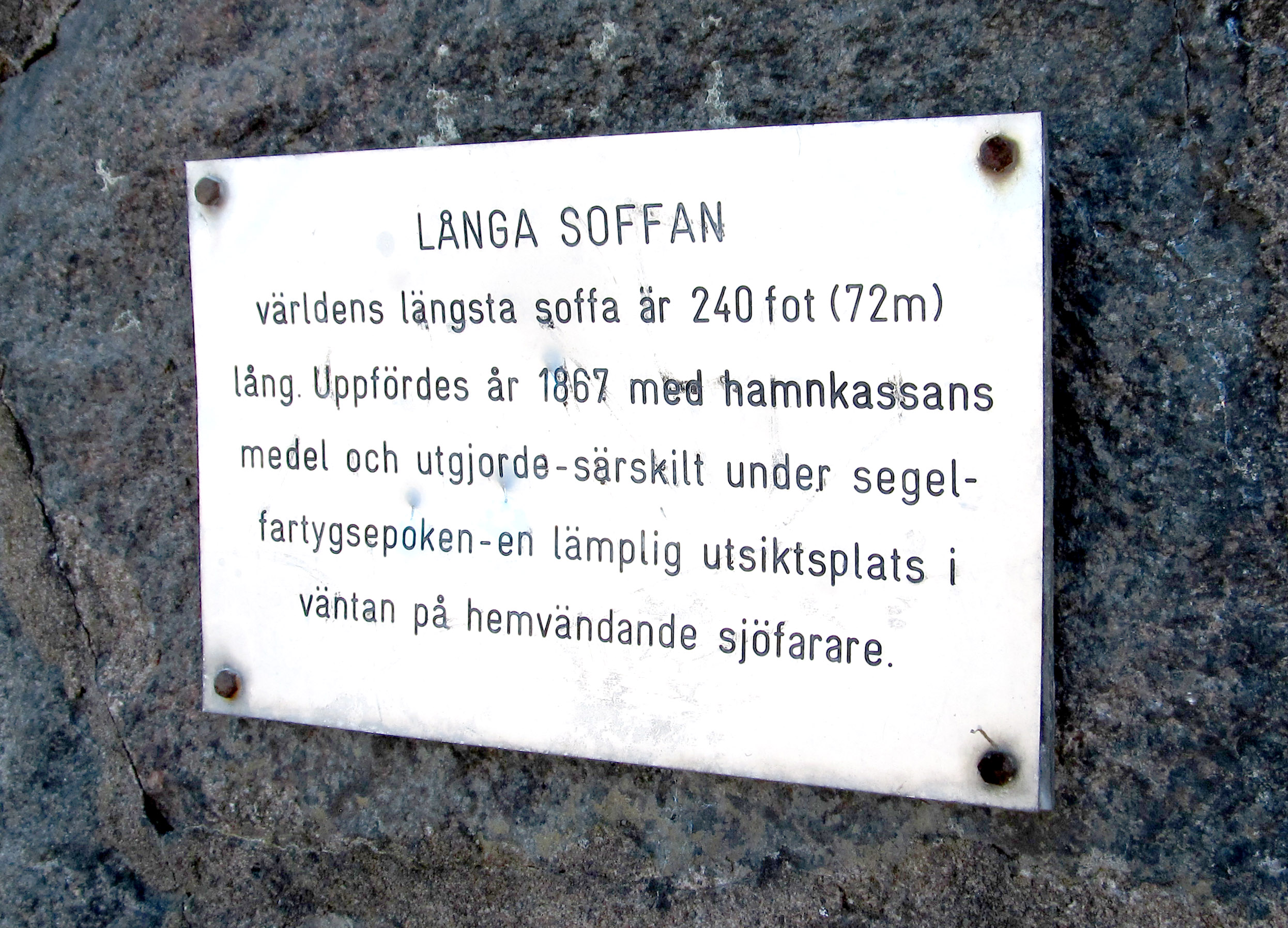
Information plaque.

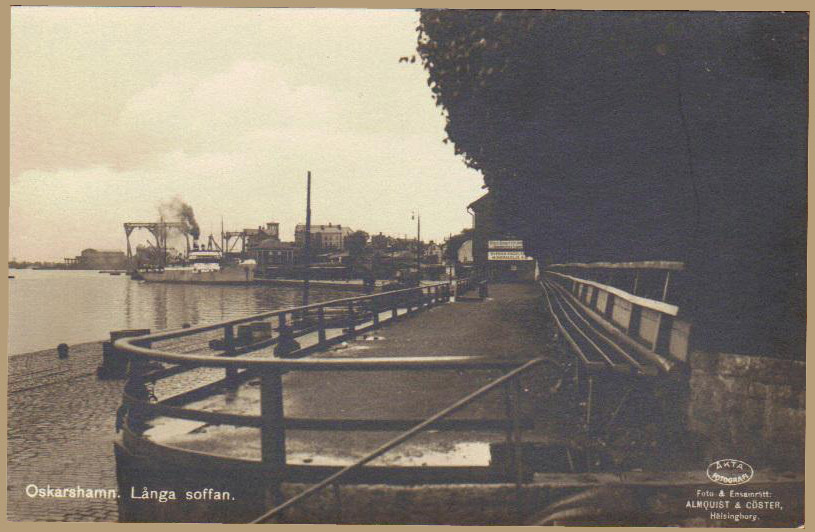
Långa Soffan in the 1930s.
