= Döderhultarn Museum =

Sculpture museum in Oskarshamn, Sweden

Coordinates: 57°15′46.2″N 16°26′46.6″E

- Döderhultarmuseet
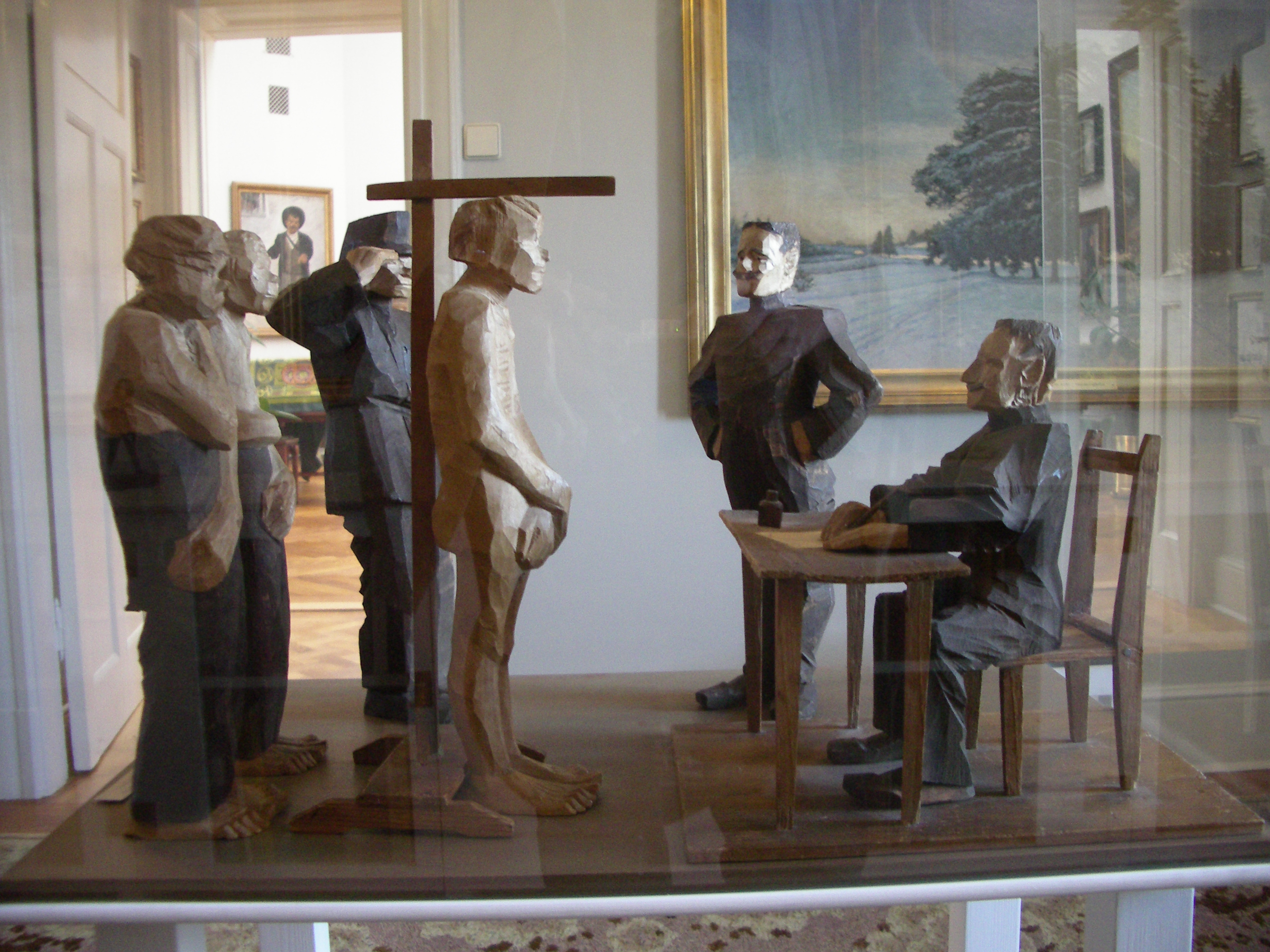
- Established: 1911
- Location: Oskarshamn, Sweden, Europe
- Visitors: 25 000

The Döderhultarn Museum (Swedish: Döderhultarmuseet) is a museum in Oskarshamn, Sweden that exhibits the carved works of Axel Petersson Döderhultarn.

== General information ==
Axel Petersson "Döderhultarn" (1868–1925) was a Swedish woodcarver. In the Döderhultarn Museum there is a collection of his work, with more than 200 wooden sculptures. The museum is located to the same building as the library in the central parts of Swedish town Oskarshamn.

=== Gallery ===
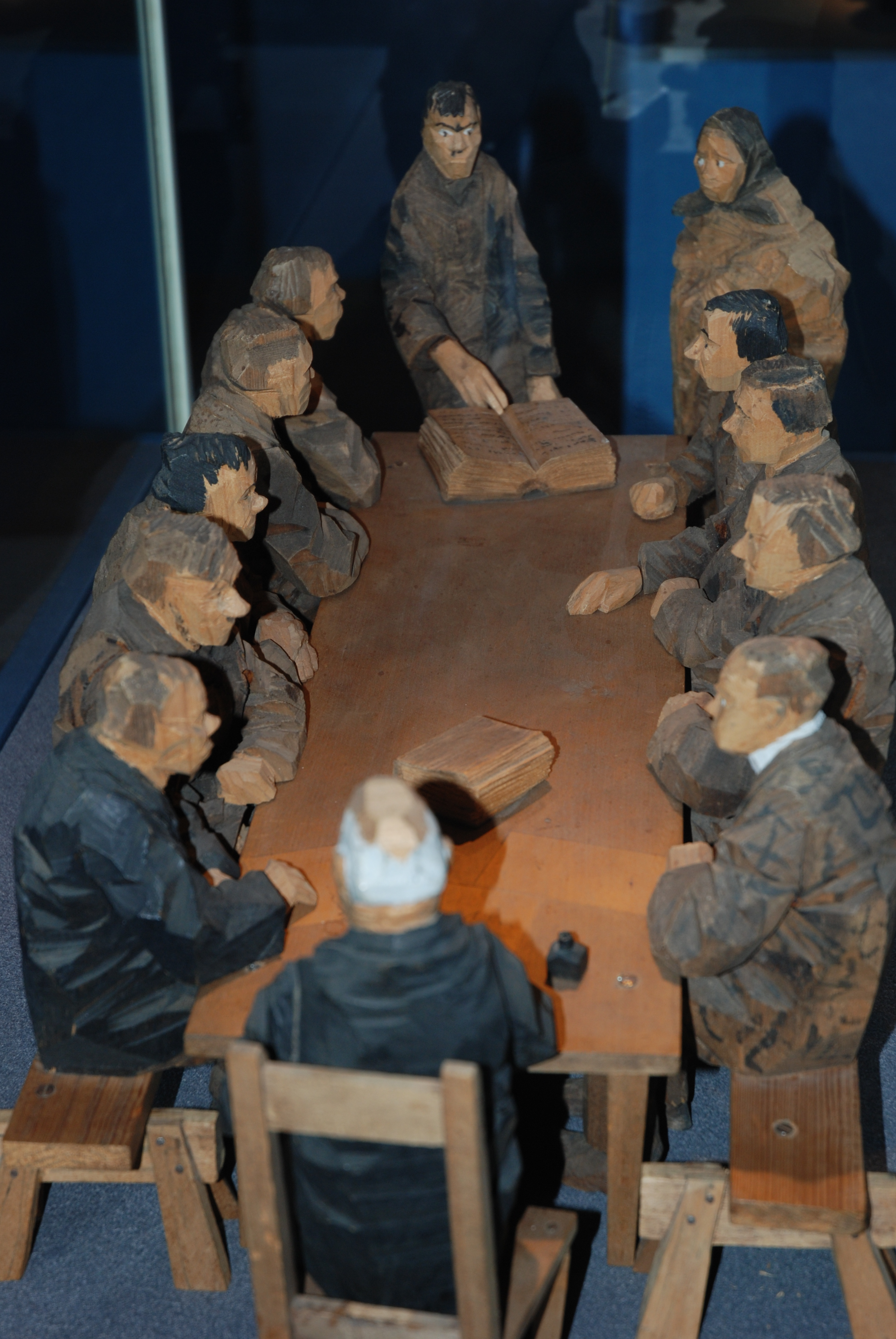
Häradsrätten. Trial at the District Court.

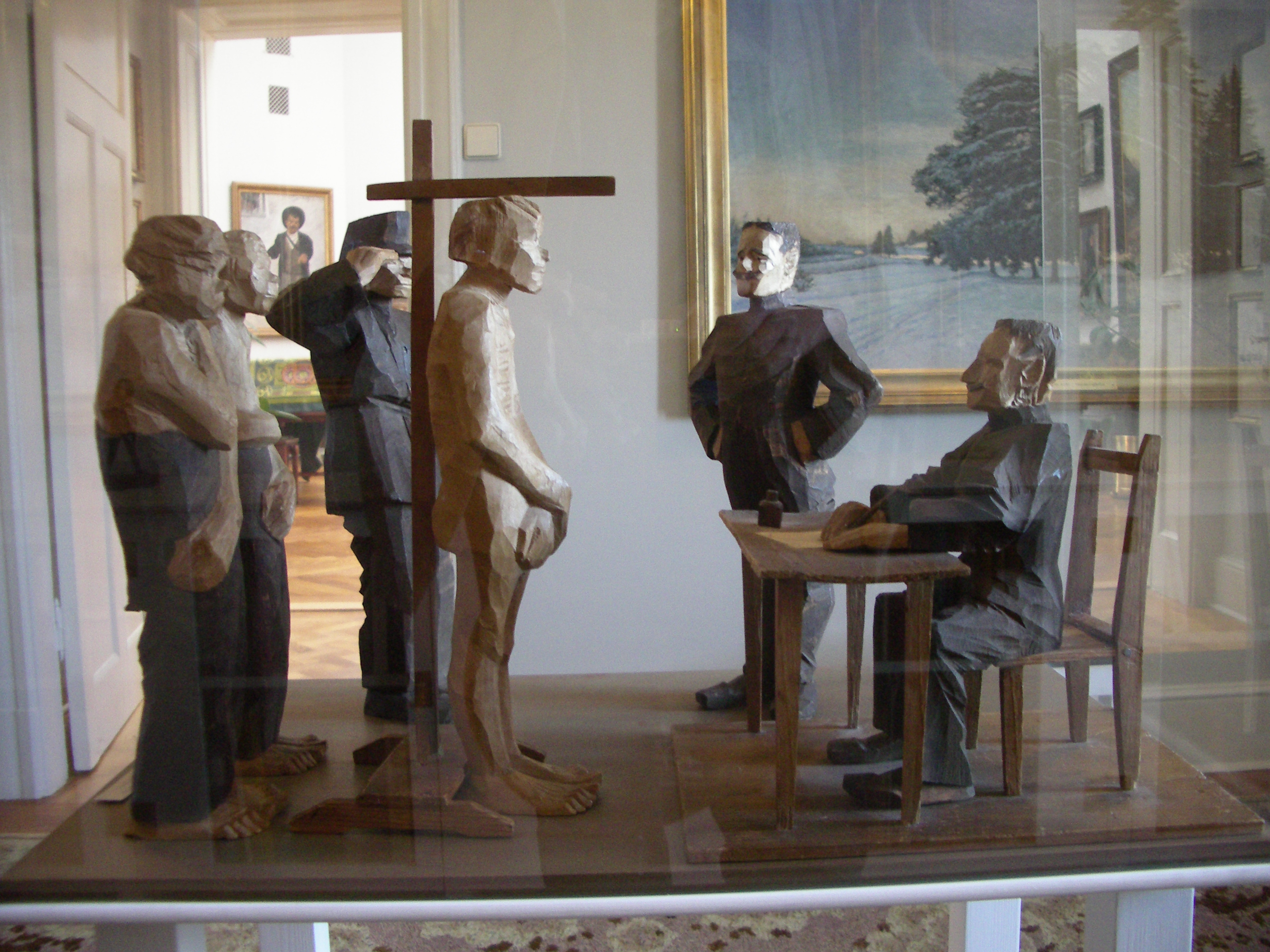
Beväringsmönstring. Signing for the army.

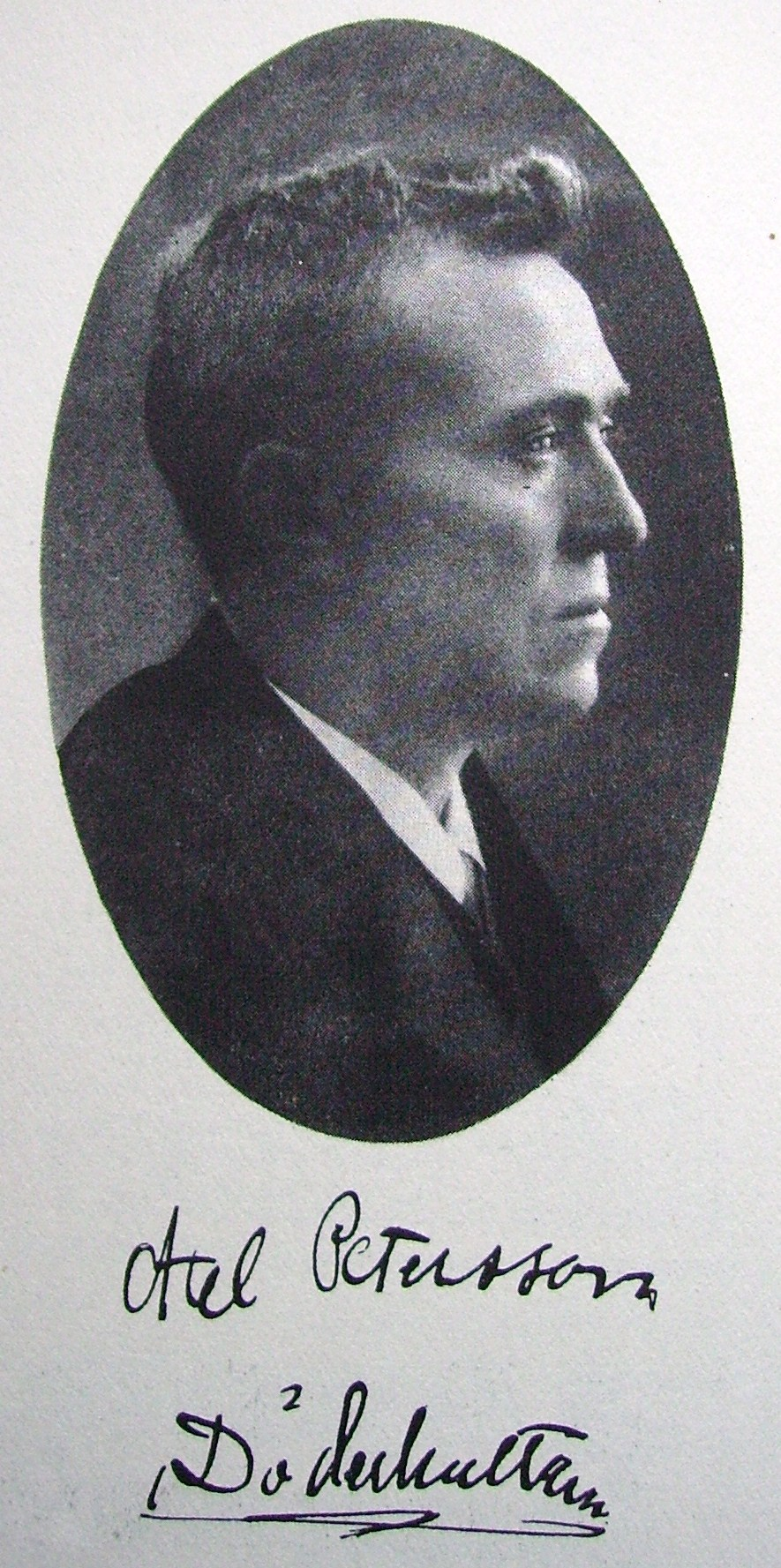
Portrait of woodcarver Axel Peterson in 1936.

== See also ==
- List of single-artist museums

== Other sources ==
- Refsal, Harley (2015) Carving Flat-Plane Style Caricatures (Fox Chapel Publishing) ISBN 978-1-56523-858-9
- Refsal, Harley (2015) Scandinavian Figure Carving (Fox Chapel Publishing) ISBN 978-1565238756
- Refsal, Harley (2004) Art & Technique of Scandinavian-Style Woodcarving (Fox Chapel Publishing) ISBN 978-1565232303
