= Axel Petersson Döderhultarn =

Swedish artist (1868–1925)

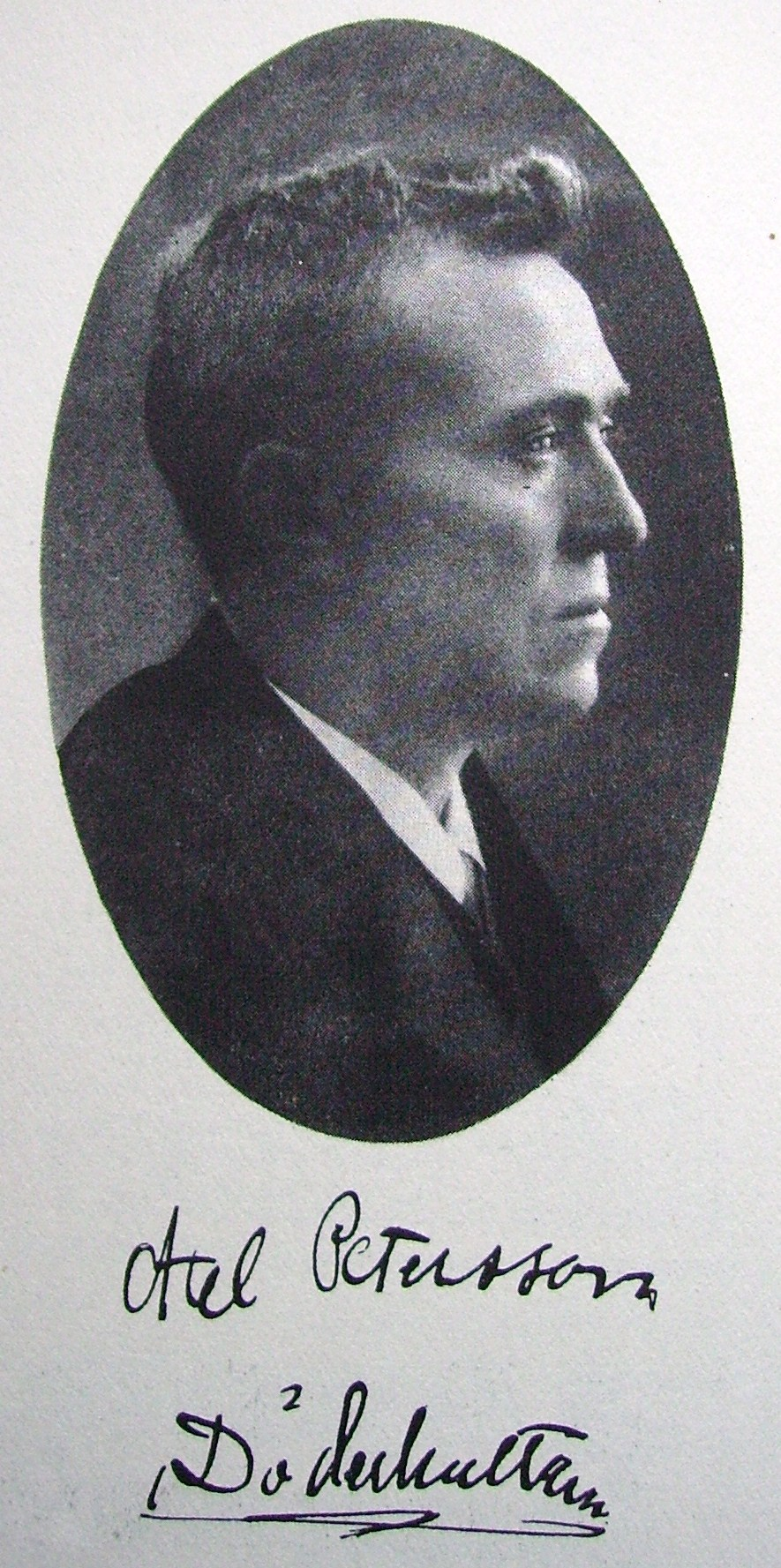
Axel Petersson Döderhultarn

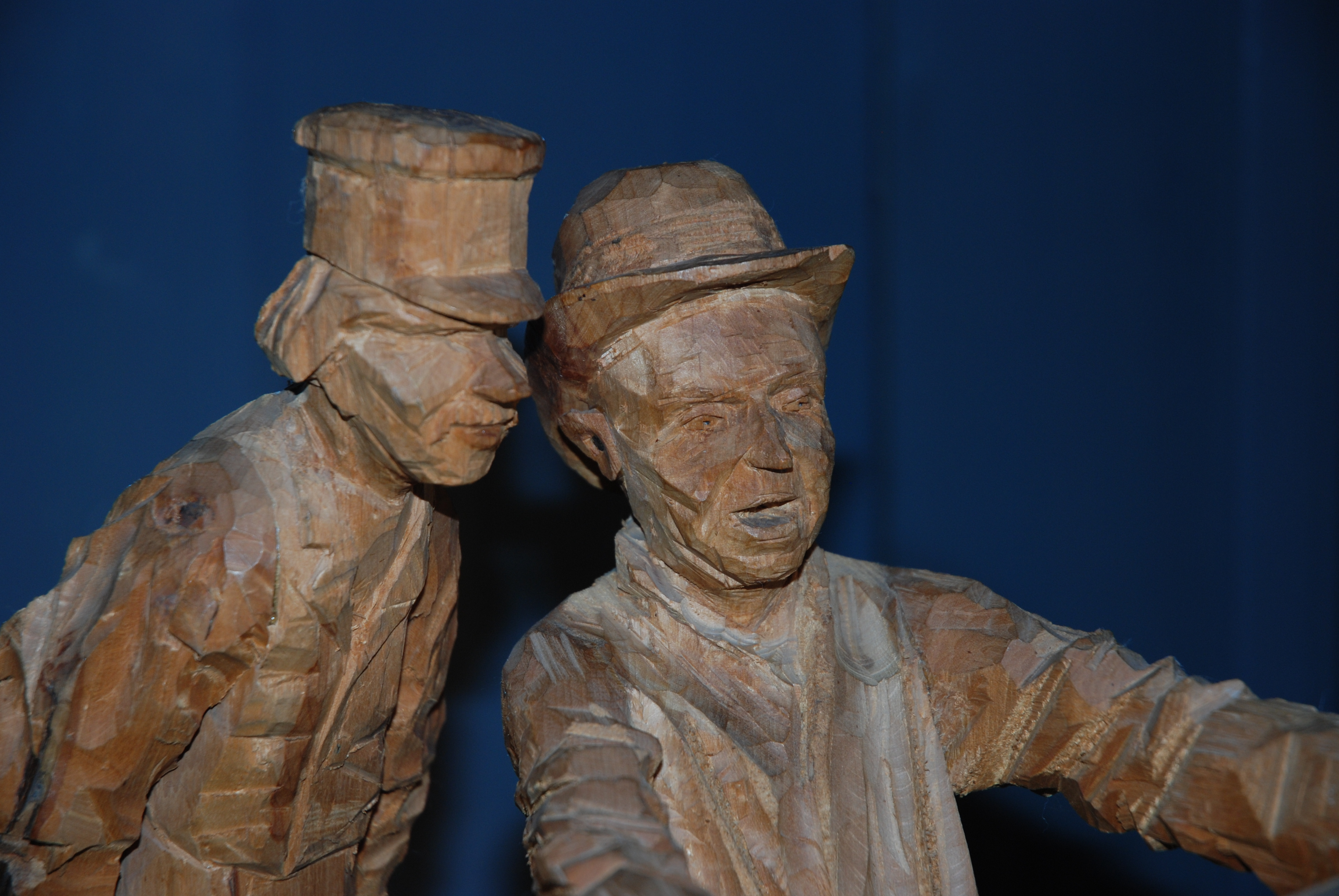
Self-portrait

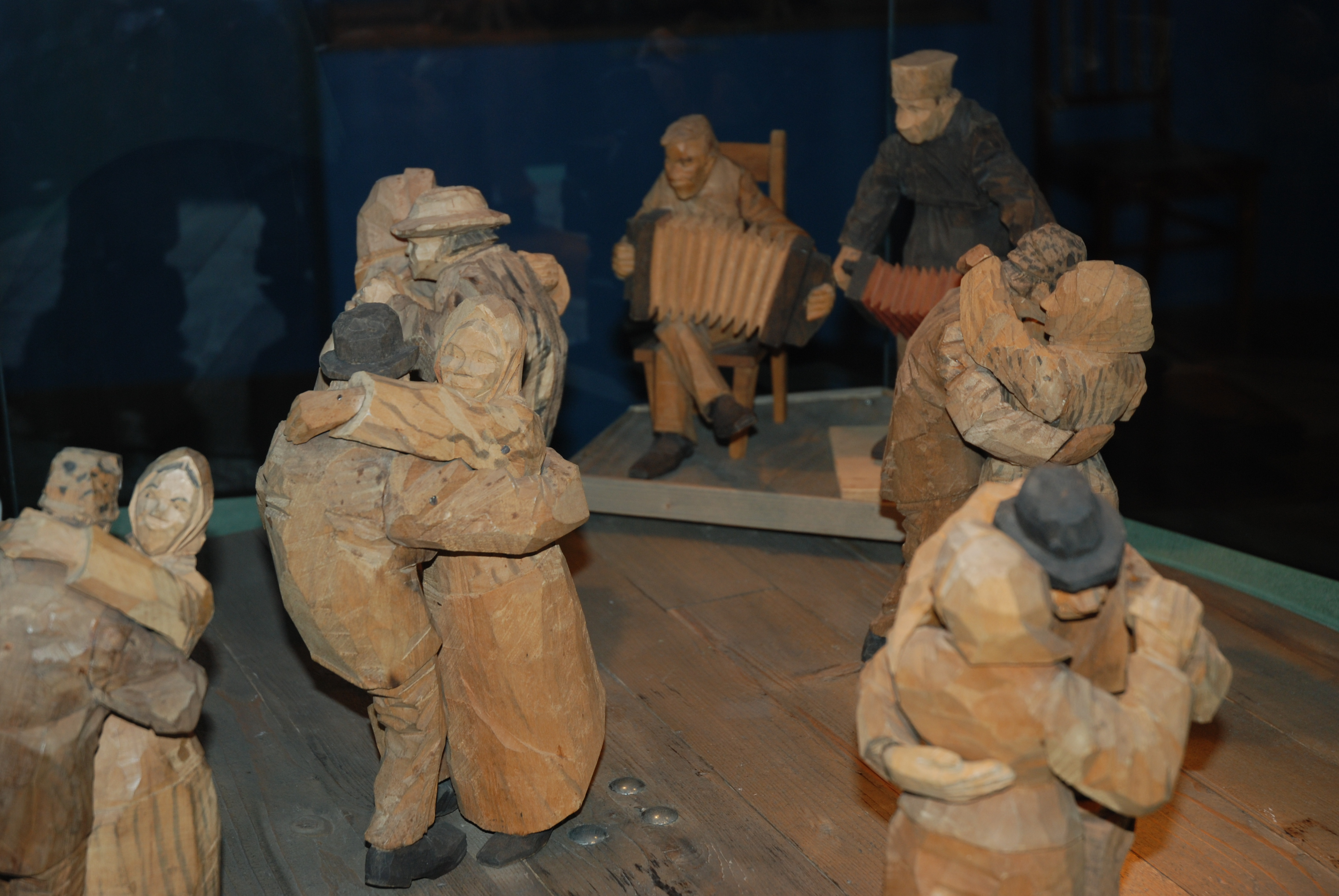
At the dance course

Axel "Döderhultarn" Petersson, formerly Axel Petersson, (12 December 1868 – 15 March 1925) was a Swedish wood carver who was one of the recognized masters of wood carving, most famous for Scandinavian flat-plane-style woodcarving.

== Early years ==
Axel Petersson Döderhultarn was born in the parish of Döderhult in Oskarshamn Municipality. His parents were Eva Lotta Persdotter and Per August Petersson. When he was five years of age, his father died. Members of his family decided the best thing for him to do as a young adult was to emigrate to the United States. Petersson did not emigrate to America, as his family had planned, and after a brief time away he moved back to help his widowed mother in Oskarshamn.

In his youth, his primary interest was in whittling, and carving small figures. He worked on figure carving and sold figurines in the local market in Oskarshamn. Most of the figures he sold were refined traditional wood carvings. Sometime around 1900 he began to carve in a minimalist style. These are the carved figures he is most famous for. Many of these carvings sold in the local market for $1.00 – $2.00 USD. Adjusted for inflation, $1.50 in 1900 would be equivalent to $33.23 in 2005.

== Recognition ==
In 1909, Petersson was invited to participate in an exhibition in Stockholm. The public response to his work was overwhelming. Georg Nordensvan wrote in the newspaper Dagens Nyheter on 20 January 1909, "Axel Petersson's old men are irresistibly amusing. They depict such primitive art as one could wish for, made out of a couple of simple contours using only a couple of strokes, but, from an artist with sure eye and nimble hands. It is a new conception with a personal touch...small masterpieces of complete nonconformative art."

After his success with the Stockholm exhibition, some of the museums in Sweden began purchasing his work. He had many requests to exhibit his work throughout Europe and the United States. In 1911 fifty-seven of his figures were on display in Oskarshamn, and the groundwork was laid for a Döderhultarn Museum. His work was also featured in exhibitions in Copenhagen, Brighton, Rome and Turin during 1911. The next year some of his work was shipped to the United States and the Swedish Consulate sent it on tour in several major cities: New York City (1913) and San Francisco and Chicago (1915).

== Legacy ==
Döderhultarn became known as one of Sweden's great artists. His work, as well as photos of his work, were circulated worldwide and he served as an inspiration to other woodcarvers, including Carl Johan Trygg (1887–1954) and H. S. "Andy" Anderson (1892–1960). His popularity was so great that Döderhultarn figure became the generic term for any small figure in the minimalist style.

== Notes ==
1. Axel "Döderhultarn" Petersson was born Axel Petersson. After his success and many tour requests he was hailed as "the man from Döderhult (Döderhultarn)" Petersson became known by the nickname Döderhultarn.
2. Page 26, Refsal, Harley (1992). Woodcarving in the Scandinavian Style. Sterling Publishing Co., Inc., New York, New York. p. 128. ISBN 0-8069-8633-6.

== Other sources ==
- Refsal, Harley (1992). Woodcarving in the Scandinavian Style. Sterling Publishing Co., Inc., New York, New York. p. 128. ISBN 0-8069-8633-6.
- Refsal, Harley (2015) Carving Flat-Plane Style Caricatures (Fox Chapel Publishing) ISBN 978-1-56523-858-9
- Refsal, Harley (2015) Scandinavian Figure Carving (Fox Chapel Publishing) ISBN 978-1565238756
- Refsal, Harley (2004) Art & Technique of Scandinavian-Style Woodcarving (Fox Chapel Publishing) ISBN 978-1565232303
