= Hoffman, Minnesota =

City in Minnesota, United States

Hoffman
- City
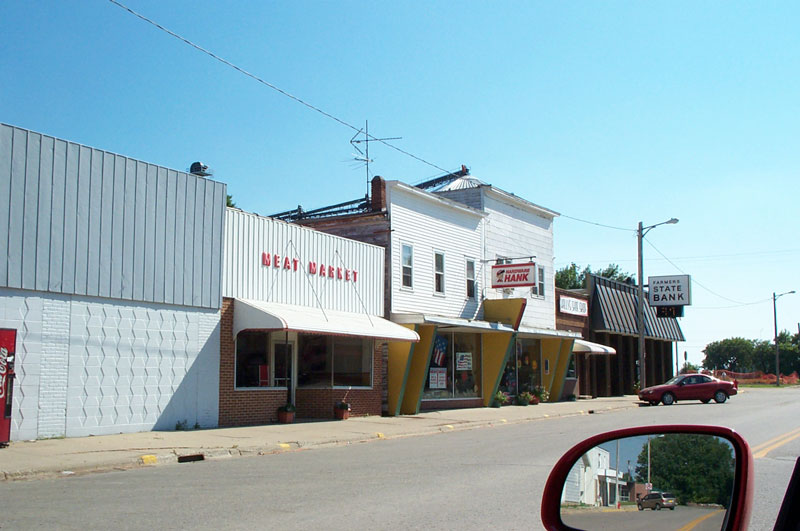
- Downtown Hoffman, Minnesota

- Location of Hoffman, Minnesota
- Coordinates: 45°49′48″N 95°47′21″W
- Country: United States
- State: Minnesota
- County: Grant

Area
  - Total: 2.10 sq mi (5.44 km^{2})
  - Land: 2.10 sq mi (5.44 km^{2})
  - Water: 0 sq mi (0.00 km^{2})
- Elevation: 1,250 ft (380 m)

Population (2020)
  - Total: 698
  - Density: 332.4/sq mi (128.34/km^{2})
- Time zone: UTC-6 (Central (CST))
  - Summer (DST): UTC-5 (CDT)
- ZIP code: 56339
- Area code: 320
- FIPS code: 27-29474
- GNIS feature ID: 0645053
- Website: http://www.hoffmanmn.com/

Hoffman is a city in Grant County, Minnesota, United States, along the Chippewa River. The population was 698 at the 2020 census.

== History ==
Hoffman was platted in 1887, and named for Robert C. Hoffman, a railroad official. A post office has been in operation at Hoffman since 1887.

== Geography ==
According to the United States Census Bureau, the city has a total area of 2.07 square miles (5.36 km^{2}), all land.

Minnesota State Highways 27 and 55 are two of the main routes in the community.

== Demographics ==
Historical population
Census	Pop.	Note	%±
1900	270		—
1910	391		44.8%
1920	475		21.5%
1930	468		−1.5%
1940	504		7.7%
1950	575		14.1%
1960	605		5.2%
1970	627		3.6%
1980	631		0.6%
1990	576		−8.7%
2000	672		16.7%
2010	681		1.3%
2020	698		2.5%
U.S. Decennial Census

=== 2010 census ===
As of the census of 2010, there were 681 people, 285 households, and 150 families residing in the city. The population density was 329.0 inhabitants per square mile (127.0/km^{2}). There were 325 housing units at an average density of 157.0 per square mile (60.6/km^{2}). The racial makeup of the city was 95.7% White, 0.1% African American, 0.4% Native American, 0.6% Asian, 0.1% Pacific Islander, 1.6% from other races, and 1.3% from two or more races. Hispanic or Latino of any race were 3.1% of the population.

There were 285 households, of which 25.3% had children under the age of 18 living with them, 41.1% were married couples living together, 7.4% had a female householder with no husband present, 4.2% had a male householder with no wife present, and 47.4% were non-families. 39.3% of all households were made up of individuals, and 21.1% had someone living alone who was 65 years of age or older. The average household size was 2.24 and the average family size was 3.07.

The median age in the city was 43.2 years. 21.6% of residents were under the age of 18; 6.4% were between the ages of 18 and 24; 24.6% were from 25 to 44; 22.3% were from 45 to 64; and 25.1% were 65 years of age or older. The gender makeup of the city was 47.7% male and 52.3% female.

=== 2000 census ===
As of the census of 2000, there were 672 people, 274 households, and 164 families residing in the city. The population density was 319.9 inhabitants per square mile (123.5/km^{2}). There were 307 housing units at an average density of 146.2 per square mile (56.4/km^{2}). The racial makeup of the city was 98.36% White, 0.45% African American, 0.89% Native American, and 0.30% from two or more races. Hispanic or Latino of any race were 0.15% of the population.

There were 274 households, out of which 26.3% had children under the age of 18 living with them, 49.3% were married couples living together, 8.8% had a female householder with no husband present, and 39.8% were non-families. 35.0% of all households were made up of individuals, and 23.4% had someone living alone who was 65 years of age or older. The average household size was 2.25 and the average family size was 2.94.

In the city, the population was spread out, with 21.3% under the age of 18, 7.1% from 18 to 24, 21.6% from 25 to 44, 19.0% from 45 to 64, and 31.0% who were 65 years of age or older. The median age was 45 years. For every 100 females, there were 87.2 males. For every 100 females age 18 and over, there were 86.3 males.

The median income for a household in the city was $29,464, and the median income for a family was $42,955. Males had a median income of $31,818 versus $18,333 for females. The per capita income for the city was $16,725. About 1.9% of families and 10.6% of the population were below the poverty line, including 10.2% of those under age 18 and 14.6% of those age 65 or over.

== Notable person ==
- Harley Refsal - Norwegian-American woodcarver honored by a king of Norway.
