= Äspö Hard Rock Laboratory =

Underground research site in southern Sweden

Coordinates: 57.43291°N 16.66128°E

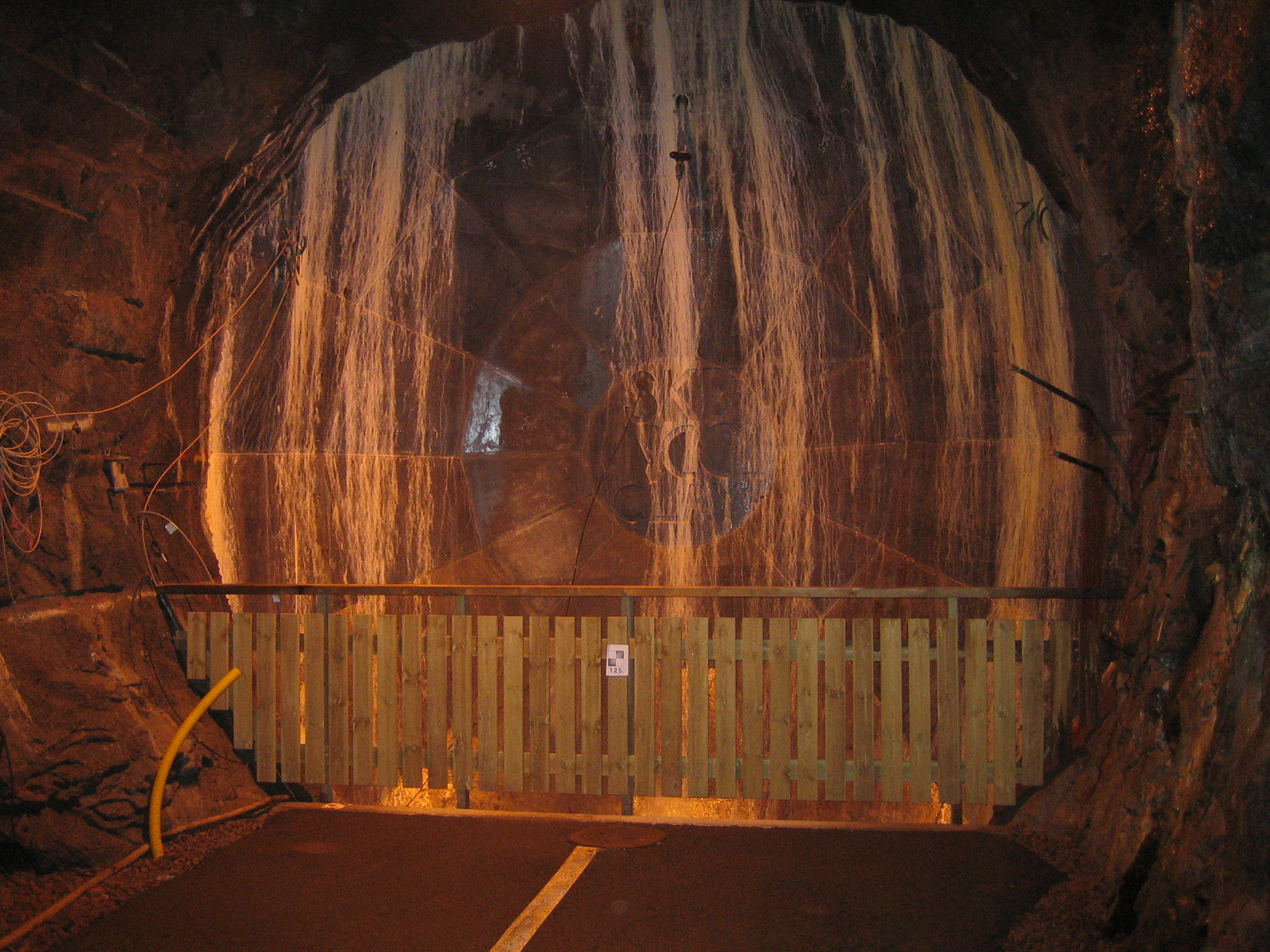
Tunnel in the Äspö Hard Rock Laboratory

Äspö Hard Rock Laboratory (Äspölaboratoriet) is a research site located outside Oskarshamn in Kalmar County, Sweden. The laboratory is located in the Misterhult archipelago, near the Oskarshamn Nuclear Power Plant (Oskarshamns Kärnkraftverk).

== General information ==
The Äspö Hard Rock Laboratory is a research facility whose construction started in 1995 for studying the future geological disposal of spent nuclear fuel. The plant is owned and operated by Svensk Nuclear Fuel Management AB (Svensk Kärnbränslehantering AB). It was built to test different methods and possibilities for the final disposal of spent nuclear fuel. At the laboratory, a series of experiments is performed at depths of 500 metres (1,600 ft) into the bedrock. Swedish and international experts cooperate in in situ experiments in the underground laboratory.

Much of the research is done for the construction of the future Spent Fuel Repository. There is no spent nuclear fuel on the site, which makes it possible to keep the Äspö laboratory open to the public. There is an exhibition at the site with information and also guided tours via a tunnel down through the bedrock, which takes the visitors as far as 500 metres (1,600 ft) below ground.
