= Oskarshamn =

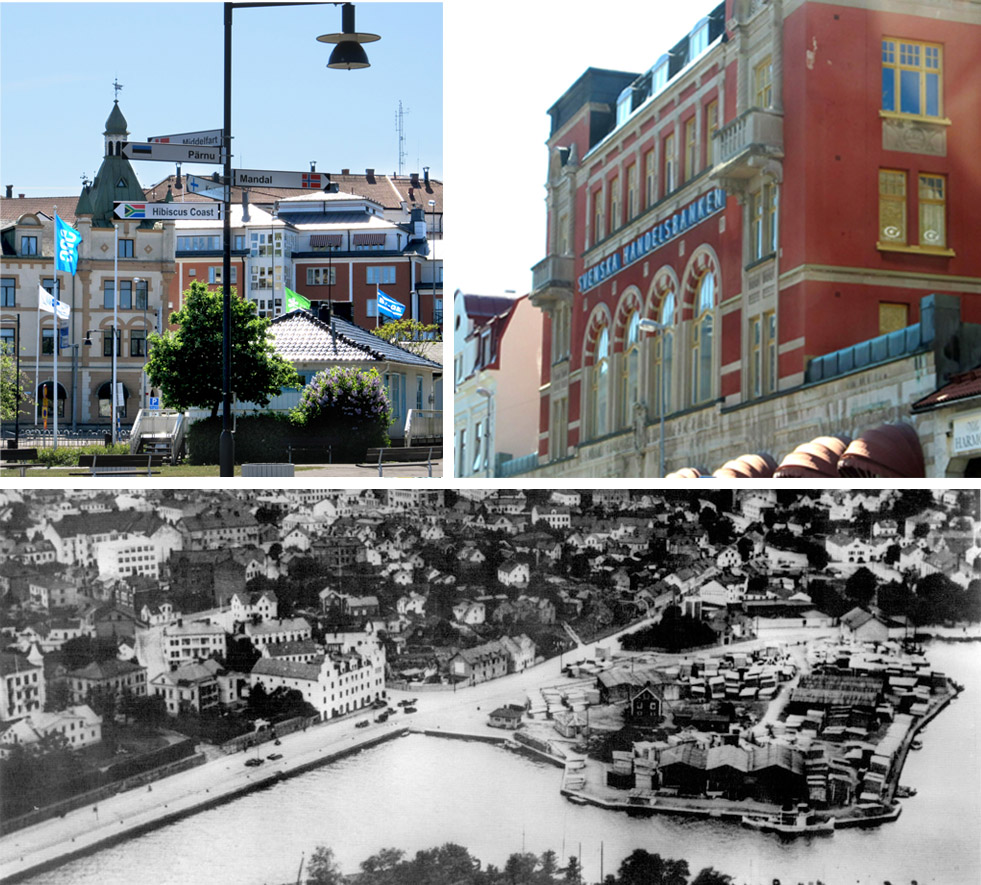
- Oskarshamn upper left: Skeppsbron; upper right: Building at Lilla torget; bottom: Harbor area.

- Coat of arms

- Location within Kalmar Location within Sweden
- Coordinates: 57°15′54″N 16°27′00″E
- Country: Sweden
- Province: Småland
- County: Kalmar County
- Municipality: Oskarshamn Municipality
- Charter: 1856
- Founder: Oscar I

Area
  - Total: 13.10 km^{2} (5.06 sq mi)

Population (31 December 2010)
  - Total: 17,258
  - Density: 1,317/km^{2} (3,410/sq mi)
- Time zone: UTC+1 (CET)
  - Summer (DST): UTC+2 (CEST)
- Website: www.oskarshamn.se

Oskarshamn is a coastal city and the seat of Oskarshamn Municipality, Kalmar County, Sweden with 17,258 inhabitants in 2010.

== History ==
=== Etymology ===
Döderhultsvik was the original name before a town charter was granted in 1856. The name was then changed to Oscarshamn (meaning: Oscar's port) after the king Oscar I of Sweden. The spelling has later changed to Oskarshamn.

=== Struggle for town charter ===
The location of Oskarshamn was known as Döderhultsvik since the Medieval age. In 1645, the city of Kalmar, to the south, made a request to the Royal Government on holding commerce in the bay there, which was granted, giving it merchancy rights as a köping. There followed 200 years of merchancies in the town, during which it was governed and dependent on Kalmar; while the surrounding towns and municipalities made frequent requests to grant it a charter, consequently turned down each of the attempts made in the years: 1786, 1798, 1800, 1815, 1818, 1823, 1825, 1830 and 1838. In 1843 it got some independence, with a local council, but the council itself was occupied by citizens of Kalmar. In 1854, King Oscar I of Sweden promised to grant it a charter as soon as it had fulfilled certain demands, including building a prison and a council hall, among other things. When they had accomplished the feats, the charter was granted, and the city became one of the Cities of Sweden on 1 May 1856. This status has no legal significance today, but Oskarshamn is now the seat of the much larger Oskarshamn Municipality without being a political entity of its own.

=== Recent history ===
Industrialisation began with the inauguration of the railway line to Nässjö. From then on, industries as well as the harbour began to expand. The biggest private employer for a long time was the Oskarshamn Shipyard, which at its height had almost 1500 employees. But in the 1970s, the Swedish shipbuilding industry suffered a large financial crisis and many shipyards closed down. In Oskarshamn, the shipyard went through a large downsizing which left many people unemployed.

However, at around the same time, two major industries were established in Oskarshamn. In 1966, Scania AB bought the truck cab factory, which had been building truck cabs since 1948, and started expanding. The Scania factory is today one of the biggest employers in Kalmar county with almost 2,000 employees. Liljeholmens Stearinfabriks AB, established in Oskarshamn in 1970, is the world’s largest candle manufacturer, specialized in stearin candles.

The oldest person in Sweden, Astrid Zachrison, was born in Åby, Fliseryd, just west of Oskarshamn. She died on her 113th birthday.

== Economy ==
The shipyard founded in 1863 is still active, as well as commercial and passenger shipping. Three different ferry lines transport passengers to Gotland, Öland and Blå Jungfrun.

Between 1965-1985, a nuclear power facility was constructed outside Oskarshamn. Three BWR units were built, that today deliver about 10% of Sweden's electrical supply. There is also a laboratory for research concerning long-time storage of spent nuclear fuel. The Äspö Hard Rock Laboratory is open to the public to visit.

The two top employers in Oskarshamn are Scania truck manufacturer and the OKG nuclear power plant. Other companies include Liljeholmens candle factory, battery manufacturer SAFT, Elajo, and Bygg Hemma.

== Sights ==
In the port of Oskarshamn there are tourist boats which take visitors to the island and national park Blå Jungfrun. There are also boats that cruise the coastal waters closer to Oskarshamn. Within the municipality there is the Oskarshamn archipelago which consists of over 5, 000 islands and small islets.

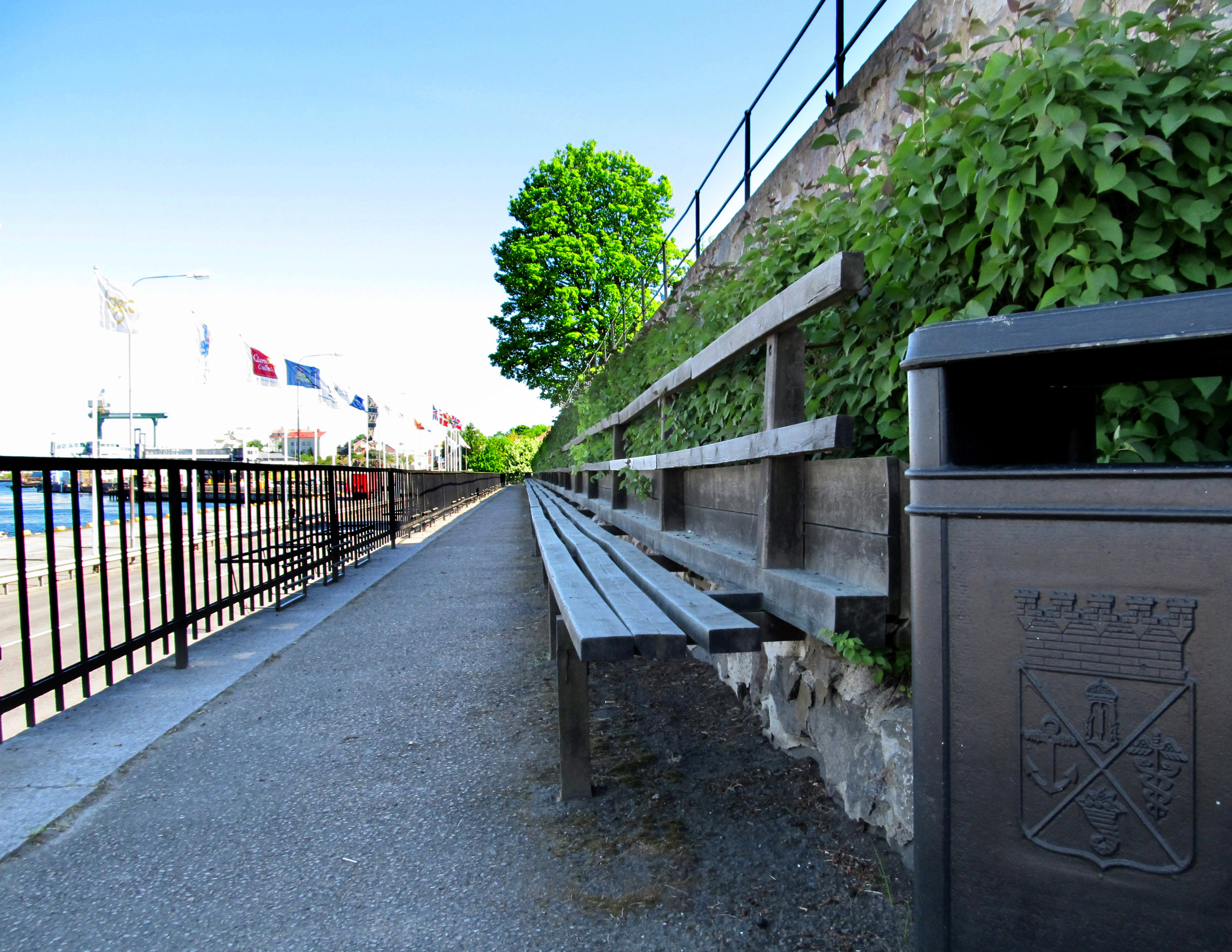
The 72-metre (236ft) wooden bench, Långa Soffan, in the port of Oskarshamn.

In the harbor area there are some restaurants, pubs and cafés. There are also viewpoints over the harbour. On the south side of the port there is a 72-metre (236 ft) wooden bench called Långa Soffan. It was built in 1867 and it is believed to be the longest of its kind in Europe. From the bench there is a panorama view over the harbor and the quite lively shipping activity going on there. There is a marina for private boats at the innermost of the harbor.

Another panorama-view of Oskarshamn and the sea outside is obtained from the top of the town’s northern water-tower which is open to the public.

The older part of Oskarshamn is preserved fairly well. In one particular part of town there are older wooden houses originating from the 19th century. The area is called Besväret and Fnyket.

Oskarshamns Stadspark is a public park located immediately south of the towns central parts.

Fredriksbergs Herrgård is a manor-house built in 1784 situated just outside the city center of Oskarshamn. It is open for the public to visit and houses a restaurant, café and a small museum.

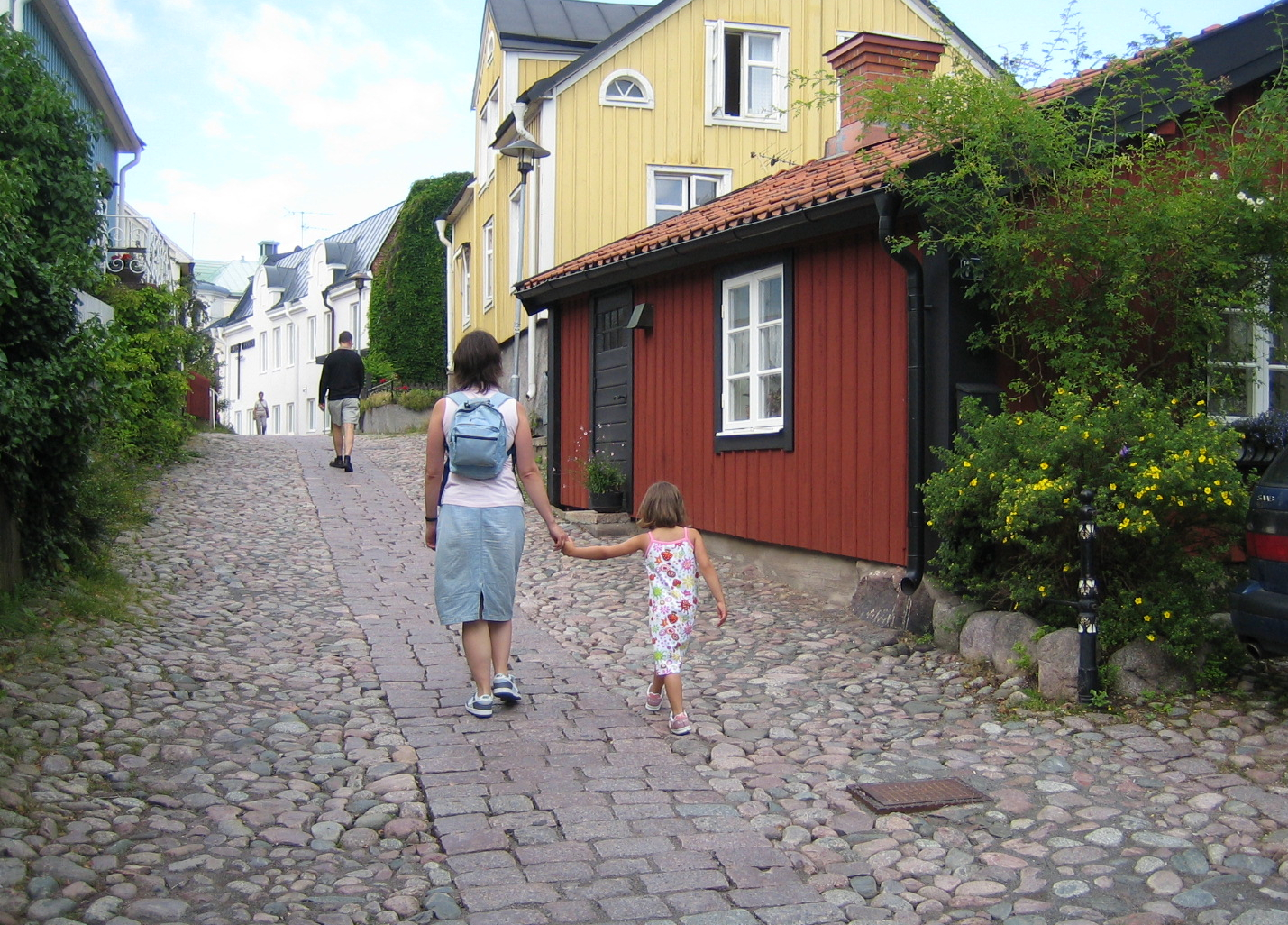
Besvärsgränd in Oskarshamn.

== Climate ==
Oskarshamn has an oceanic climate (Cfb), mild for its latitude, with winter means slightly below freezing and summer days among the warmest in Sweden and Scandinavia. Precipitation is light to moderate, typical of Southeastern Sweden.

Climate data for Oskarshamn (2002–2021 averages, extremes since 1961)
Month	Jan	Feb	Mar	Apr	May	Jun	Jul	Aug	Sep	Oct	Nov	Dec	Year
Record high °C (°F)	12.1 (53.8)	16.1 (61.0)	22.2 (72.0)	27.2 (81.0)	30.1 (86.2)	33.2 (91.8)	34.3 (93.7)	33.2 (91.8)	28.9 (84.0)	24.5 (76.1)	17.0 (62.6)	13.0 (55.4)	34.3 (93.7)
Mean maximum °C (°F)	8.2 (46.8)	9.3 (48.7)	16.1 (61.0)	20.7 (69.3)	25.1 (77.2)	28.6 (83.5)	29.2 (84.6)	28.0 (82.4)	24.7 (76.5)	18.3 (64.9)	12.8 (55.0)	8.7 (47.7)	30.7 (87.3)
Mean daily maximum °C (°F)	1.9 (35.4)	3.0 (37.4)	7.2 (45.0)	12.6 (54.7)	17.3 (63.1)	21.6 (70.9)	23.4 (74.1)	22.6 (72.7)	18.7 (65.7)	12.1 (53.8)	6.9 (44.4)	3.4 (38.1)	12.6 (54.6)
Daily mean °C (°F)	−0.9 (30.4)	−0.3 (31.5)	2.6 (36.7)	6.8 (44.2)	11.3 (52.3)	15.2 (59.4)	18.0 (64.4)	17.1 (62.8)	13.7 (56.7)	8.1 (46.6)	4.1 (39.4)	0.8 (33.4)	8.0 (46.5)
Mean daily minimum °C (°F)	−3.6 (25.5)	−3.6 (25.5)	−2.1 (28.2)	0.9 (33.6)	5.3 (41.5)	9.7 (49.5)	12.5 (54.5)	11.6 (52.9)	8.6 (47.5)	4.1 (39.4)	1.2 (34.2)	−1.9 (28.6)	3.6 (38.4)
Mean minimum °C (°F)	−14.0 (6.8)	−13.6 (7.5)	−10.5 (13.1)	−5.6 (21.9)	−1.5 (29.3)	3.4 (38.1)	7.5 (45.5)	5.5 (41.9)	1.7 (35.1)	−4.1 (24.6)	−6.9 (19.6)	−11.8 (10.8)	−17.2 (1.0)
Record low °C (°F)	−25.4 (−13.7)	−34.6 (−30.3)	−24.9 (−12.8)	−12.0 (10.4)	−7.0 (19.4)	−1.6 (29.1)	3.1 (37.6)	0.2 (32.4)	−6.6 (20.1)	−11.0 (12.2)	−24.3 (−11.7)	−26.0 (−14.8)	−34.6 (−30.3)
Average precipitation mm (inches)	44.5 (1.75)	34.5 (1.36)	29.5 (1.16)	23.5 (0.93)	44.8 (1.76)	60.6 (2.39)	75.4 (2.97)	58.1 (2.29)	33.2 (1.31)	62.6 (2.46)	61.6 (2.43)	49.0 (1.93)	577.3 (22.74)
Average extreme snow depth cm (inches)	20 (7.9)	22 (8.7)	15 (5.9)	2 (0.8)	0 (0)	0 (0)	0 (0)	0 (0)	0 (0)	1 (0.4)	6 (2.4)	10 (3.9)	30 (12)
Source 1: SMHI Open Data for Oskarshamn, precipitation
Source 2: SMHI Open Data for Oskarshamn, temperature

== Culture ==
Oskarshamn was the home of the famous woodcarver Axel Petersson Döderhultarn. His studio, as well as the Döderhultarn Museum, contains more than 200 of his carvings. There is also a maritime museum in Oskarshamn.

At the release of The Simpsons film, Swedish newspaper Sydsvenska Dagbladet concluded that Oskarshamn is the Swedish equivalent to Springfield, the Simpsons' hometown.

Each summer there is a music festival located to the harbor area. The festival, named Latitud 57 and connected to the other international Latitude music festivals, is taking place simultaneously as the annual Oskarshamn Offshore Race which is a popular competition for powerboats. The world championship in Offshore was held here in 2011.

== Education ==
There are four main elementary schools in Oskarshamn, Norra skolan, Vallhallaskolan, Rödsleskolan and Kristinebergskolan. There are also two high schools, Oscarsgymnasiet (the main high school) and Elajogymnsiet (specializing in electricity).

== Transport ==
The rail traffic is today limited to a few passenger trains a day to and from Nässjö and freight trains to and from the harbour. There is also a ferry line between the town and Visby on the Swedish island of Gotland. Oskarshamn also has its own airport, situated some 11 kilometres (7 miles) to the north of the city centre. The connection with Stockholm-Arlanda was closed down on 17 April 2014. In May 2014 there was a decision by the municipality to close down the airport totally. The nearest other airport is Kalmar Airport, 75 kilometres (47 mi) from Oskarshamn. The airport is still used for some general aviation.

== Sports ==
IK Oskarshamn is the name of the local ice hockey team. The team played in the highest hockey-league in Sweden, the Swedish Hockey League, from 2019 to 2024.

Craftstaden IBK is the name of the floorball team which is playing in the division 1-league. IFK Oskarshamn and Oskarshamns AIK are two of the towns' soccer teams. The latter plays in the division 1-league.

From 5 to 10 July 2011, Oskarshamn hosted the world championship in offshore powerboat racing.

== International relations ==
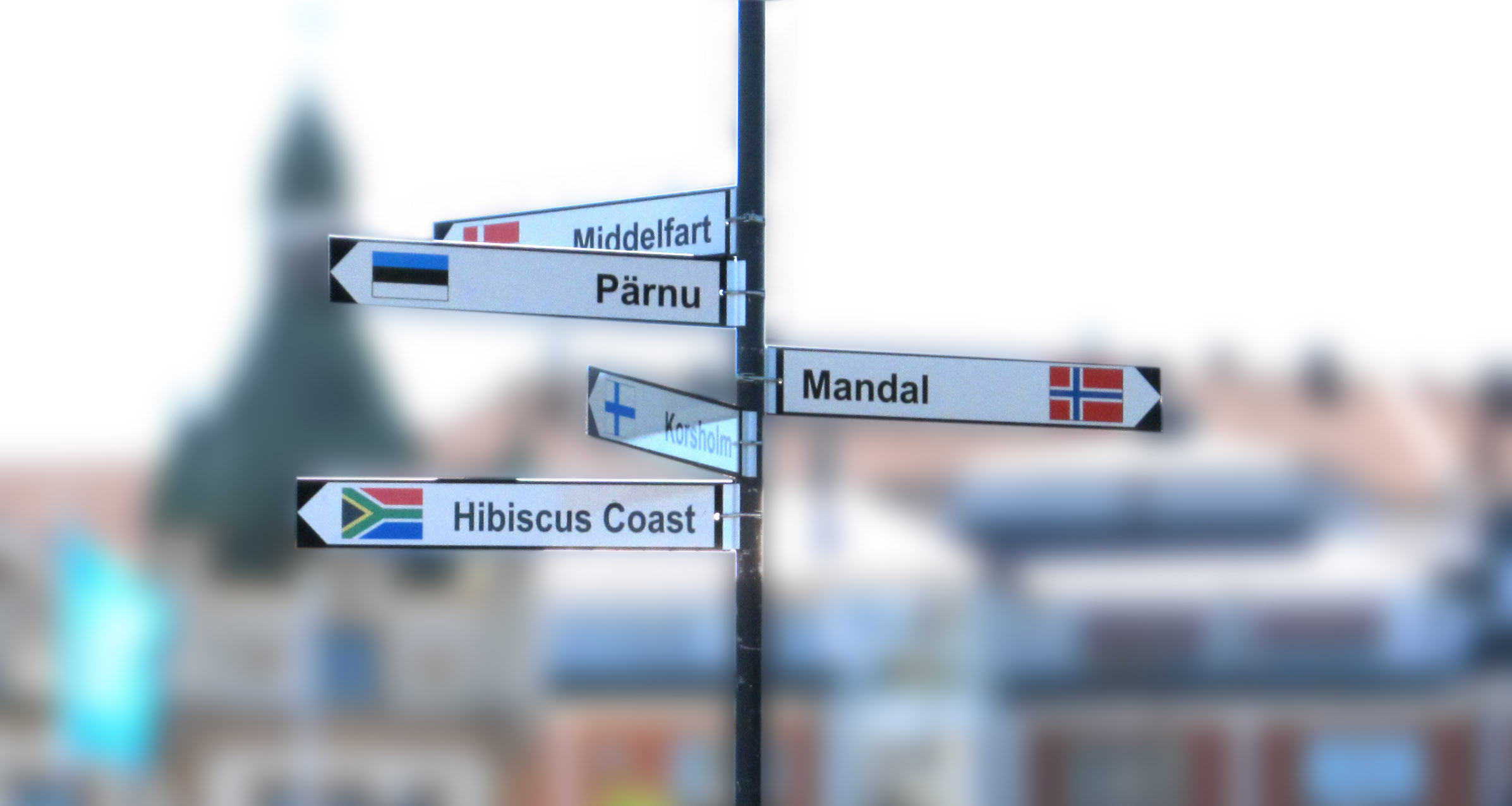
Twin towns sign in Oskarshamn

=== Twin towns – sister cities ===
Oskarshamn is twinned with:

- Pärnu, Estonia
- Port Shepstone, South Africa
- Korsholm, Finland
- Mandal, Norway
- Middelfart, Denmark

== Gallery ==
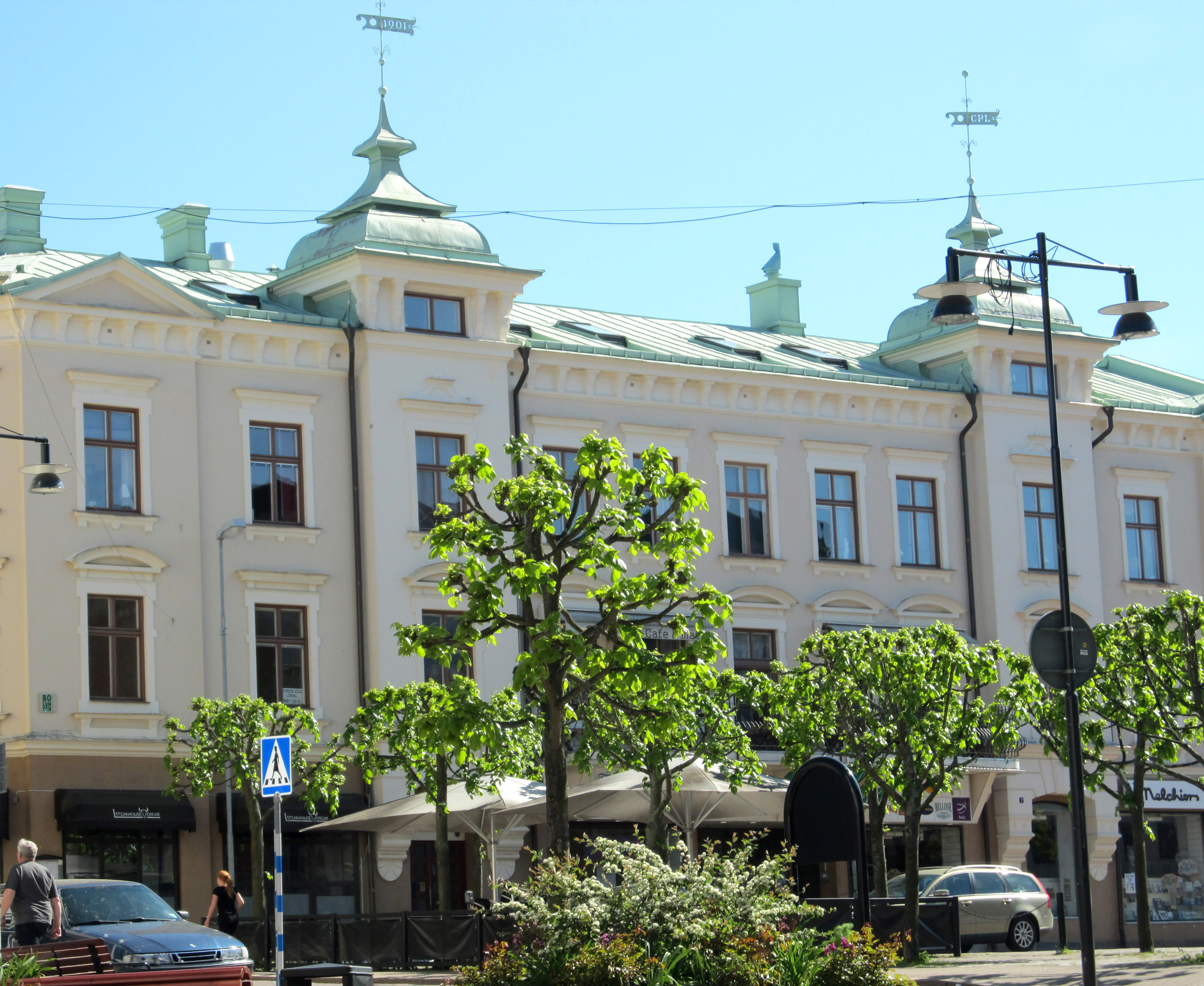
Building from 1901 at square Lilla torget.

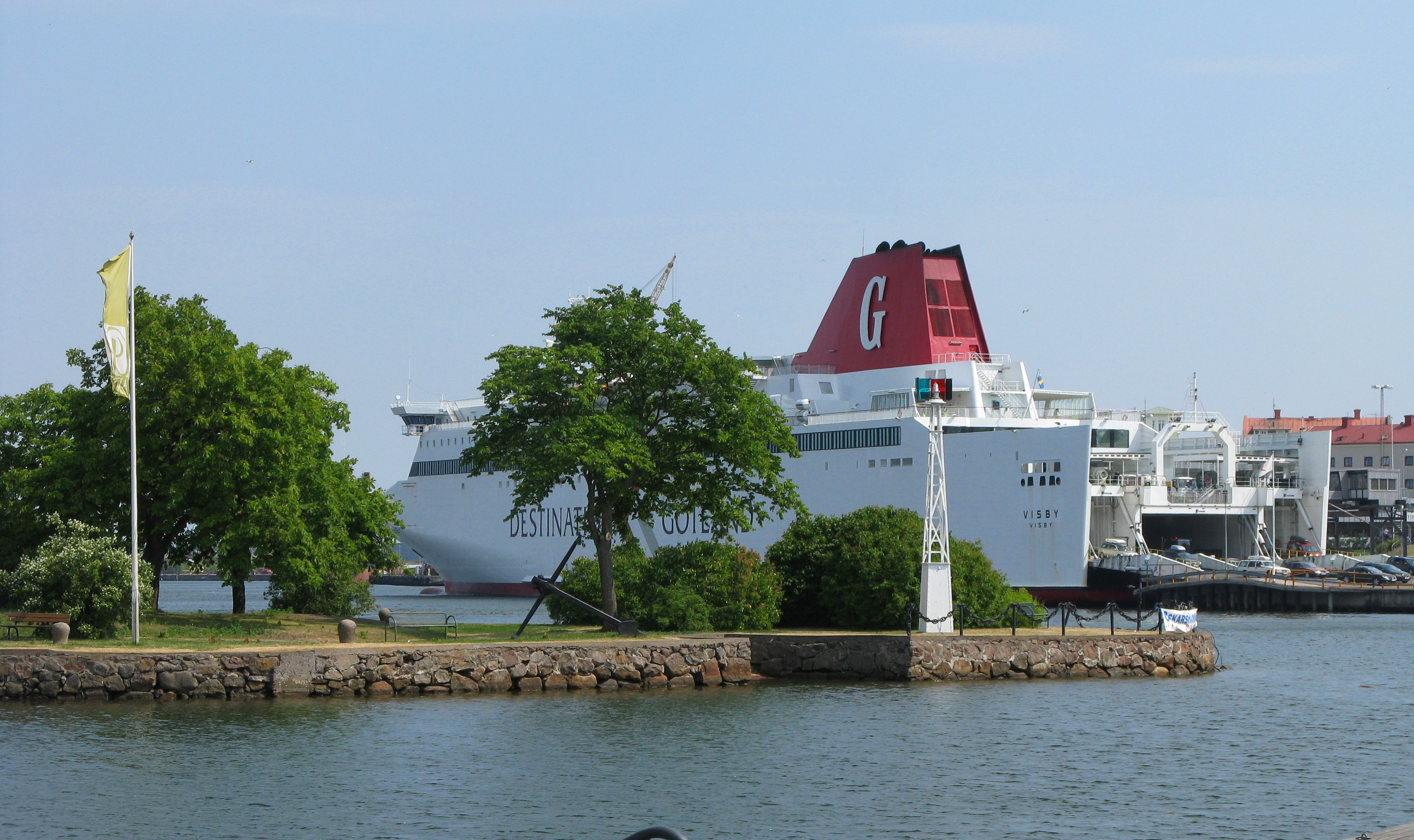
Islet named Badholmen. Ferry M/S Visby in the background.

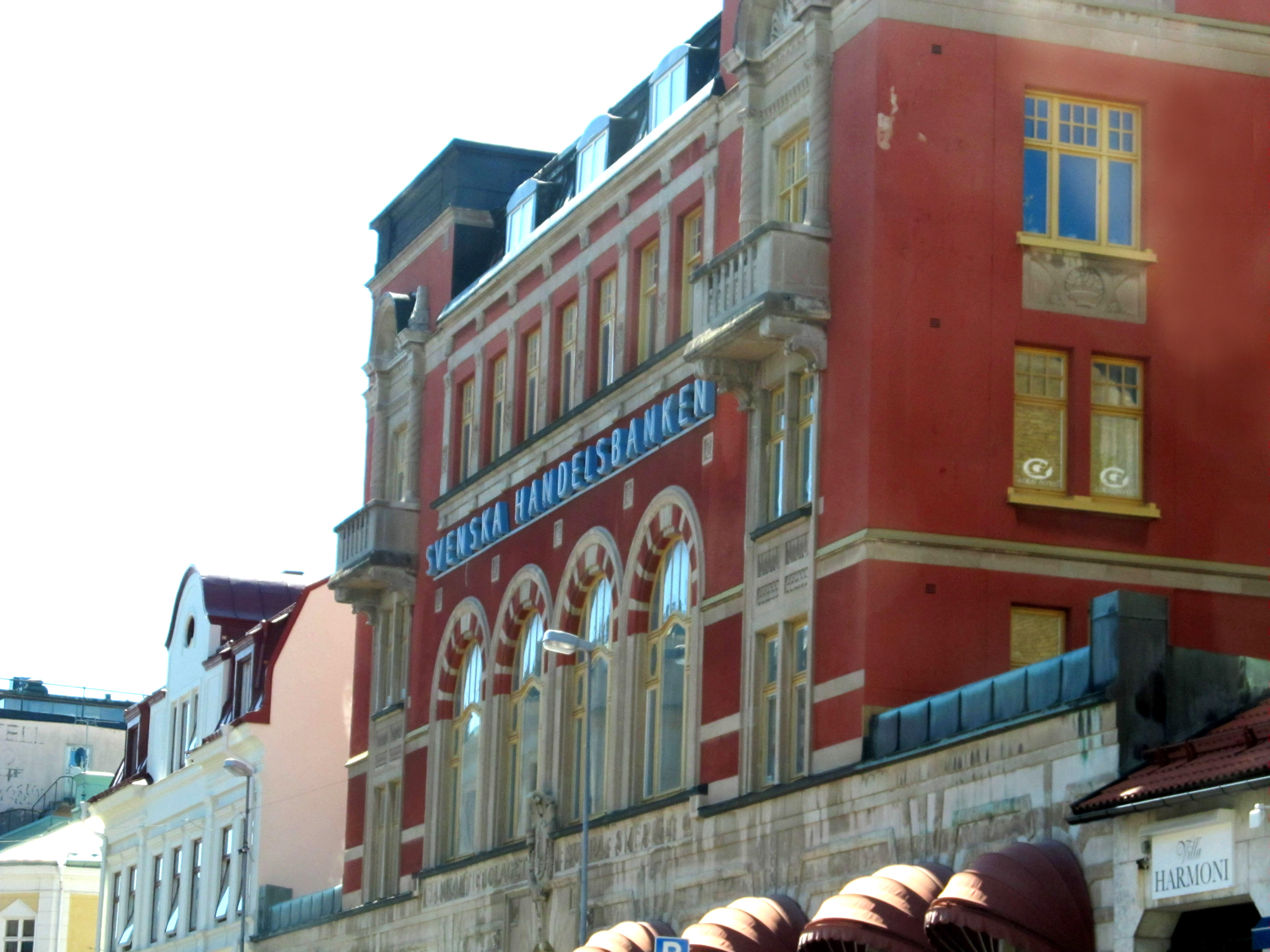
Bank building at square Lilla torget.

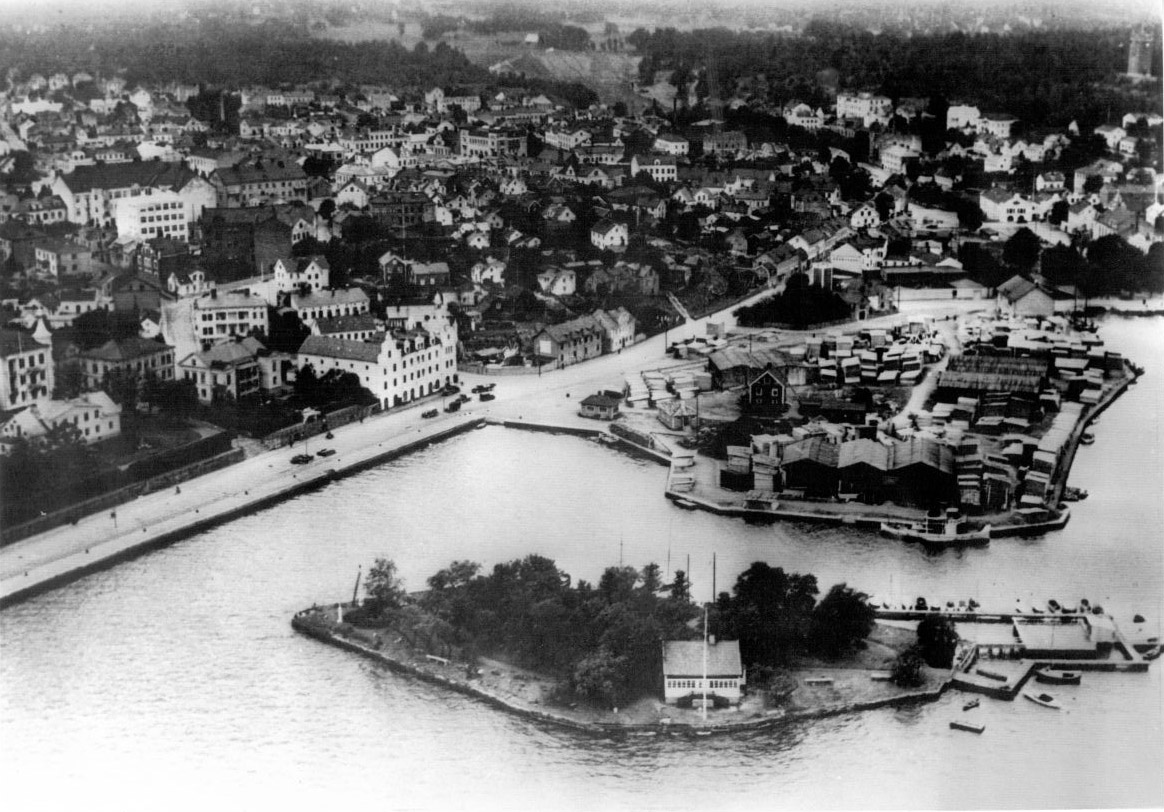
Oskarshamn harbour in 1930.

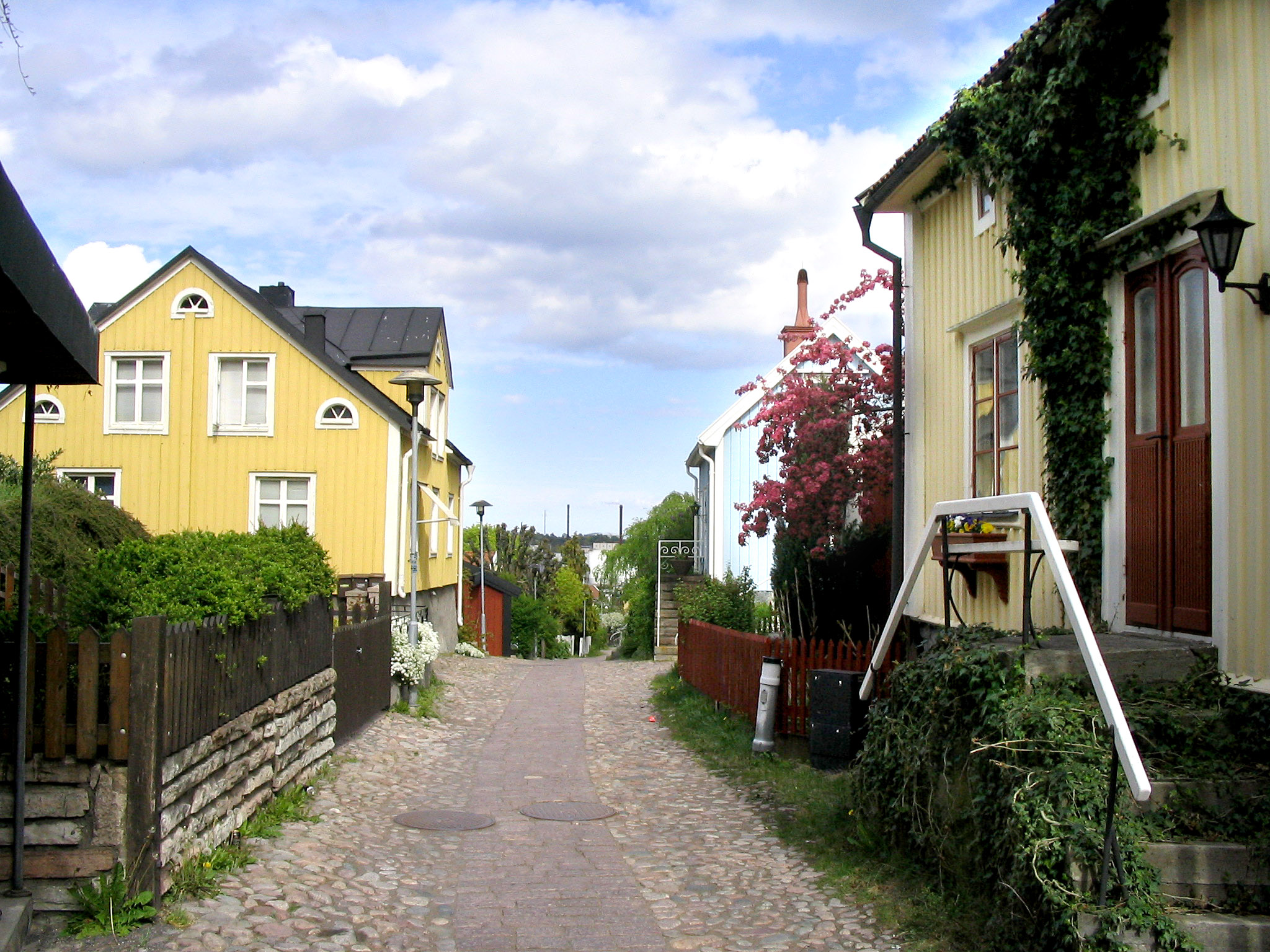
Older parts of Oskarshamn; Besväret och Fnyket.

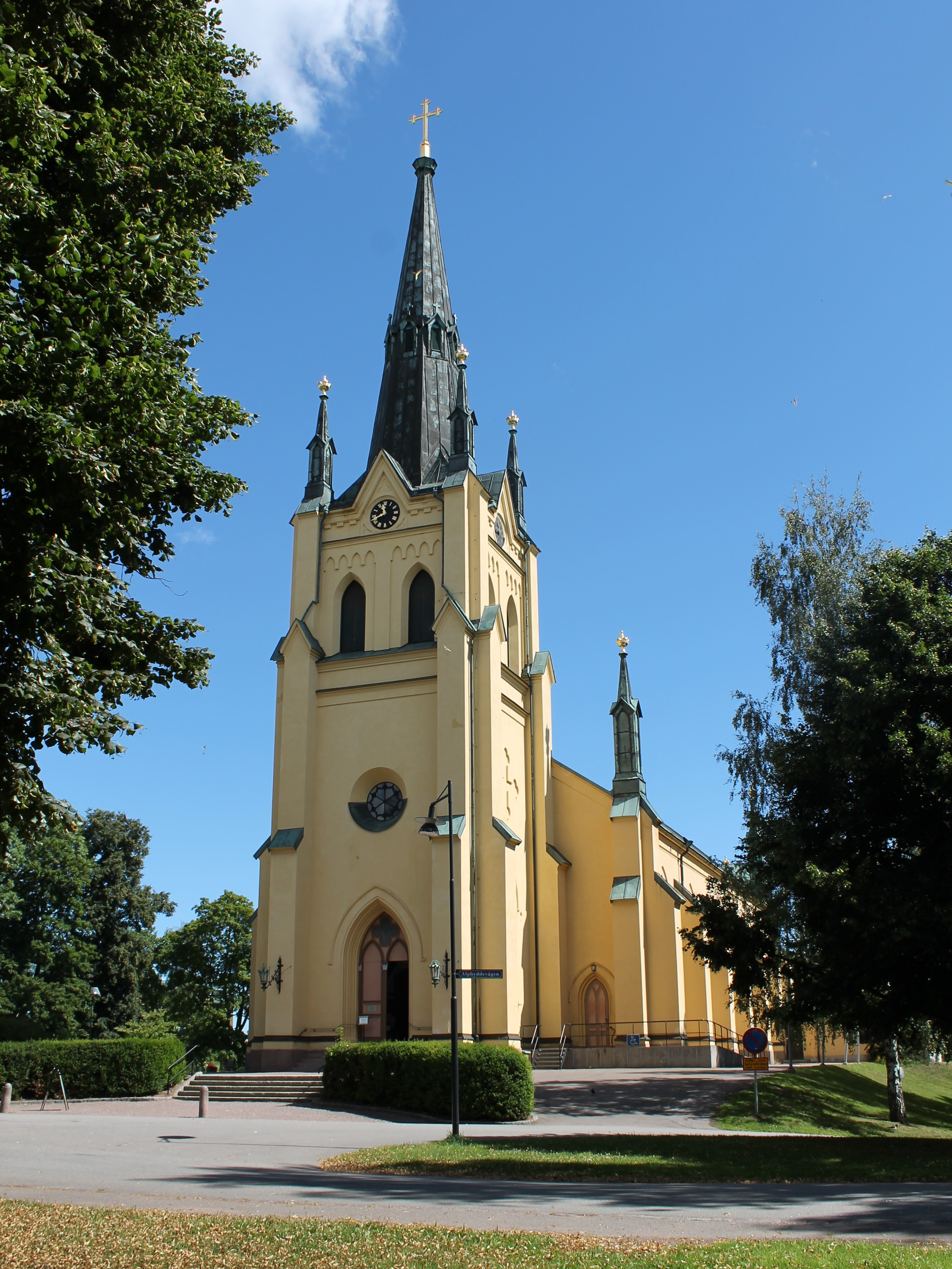
Churchtower.

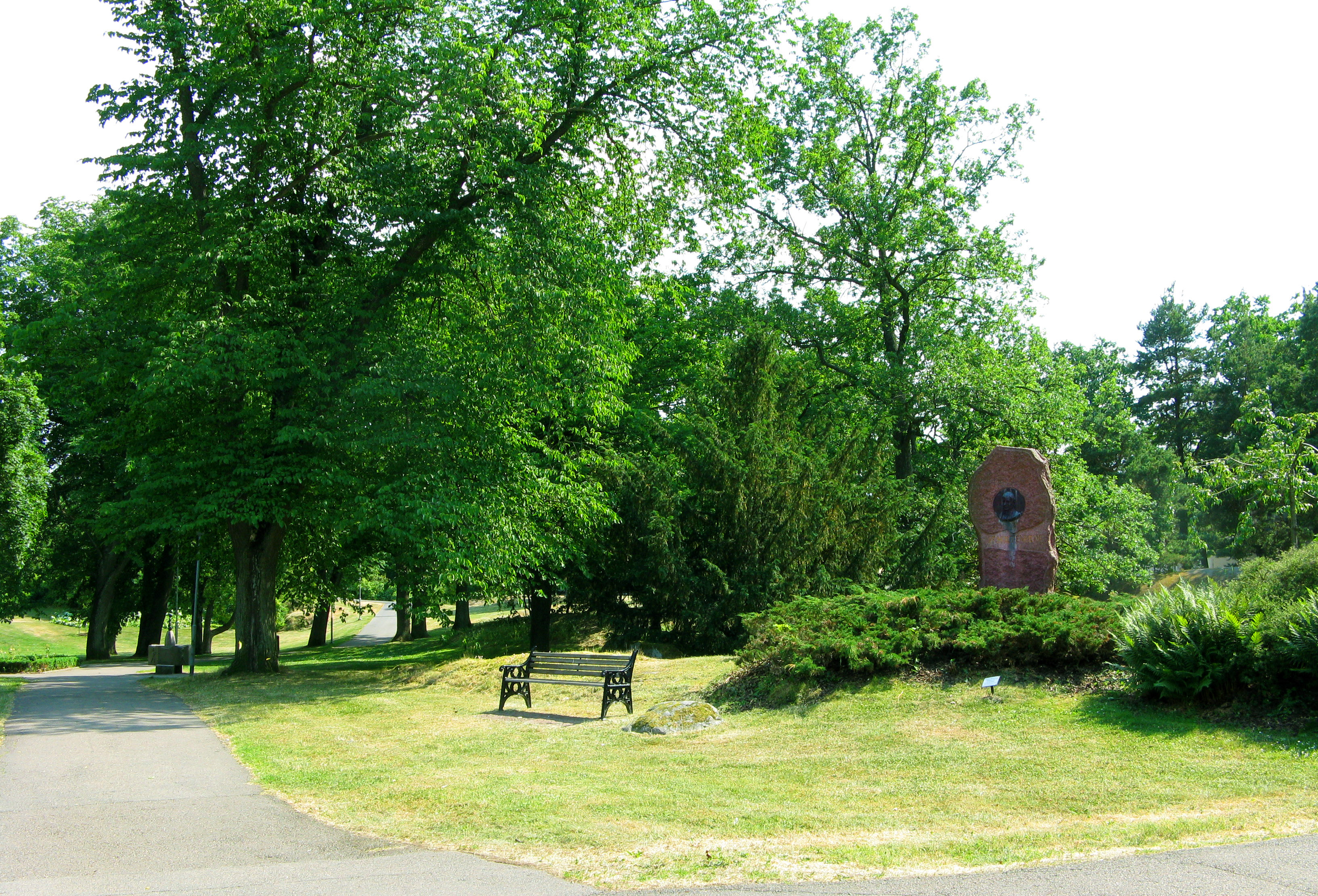
City park.

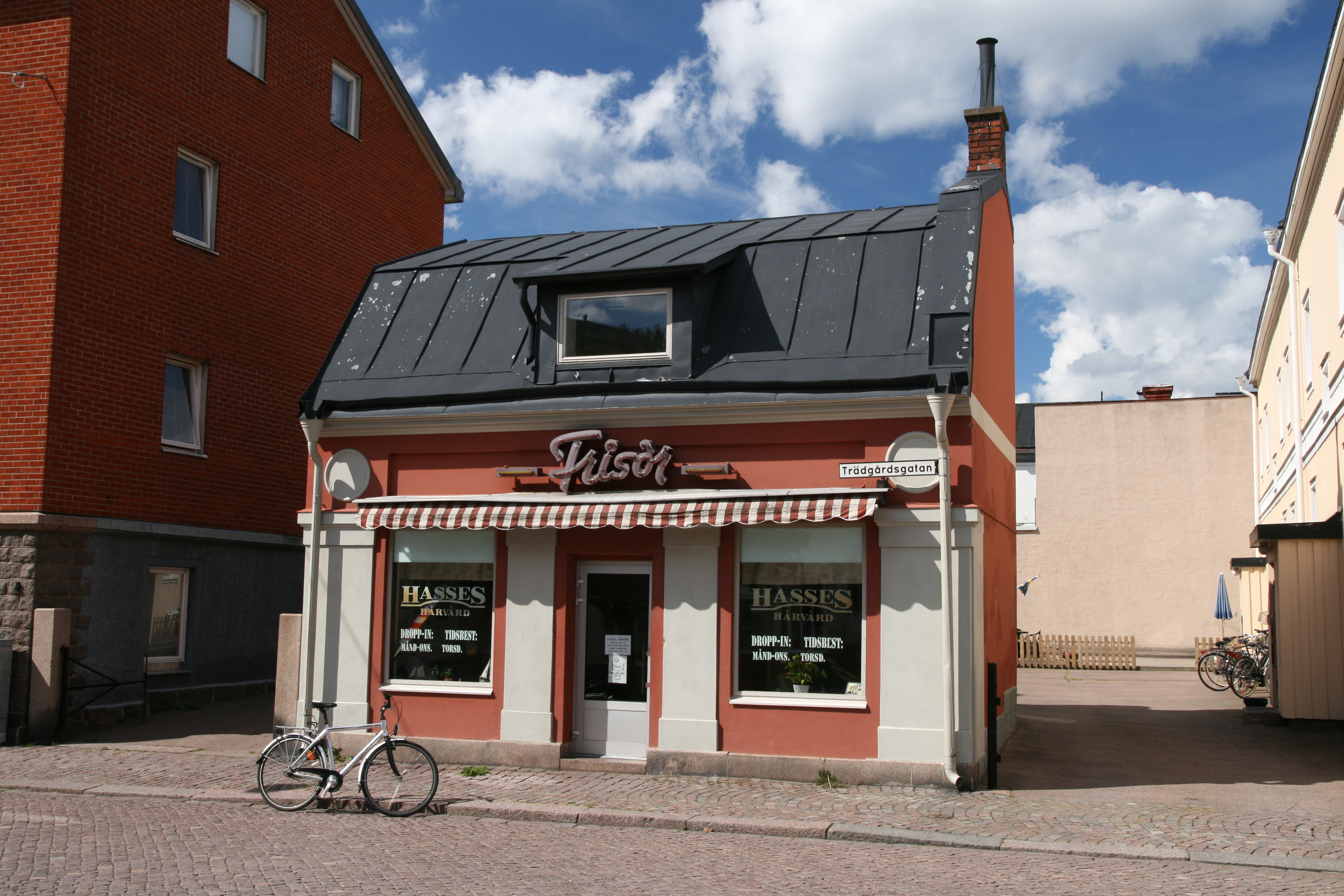
Barbershop at Trädgårdsgatan.

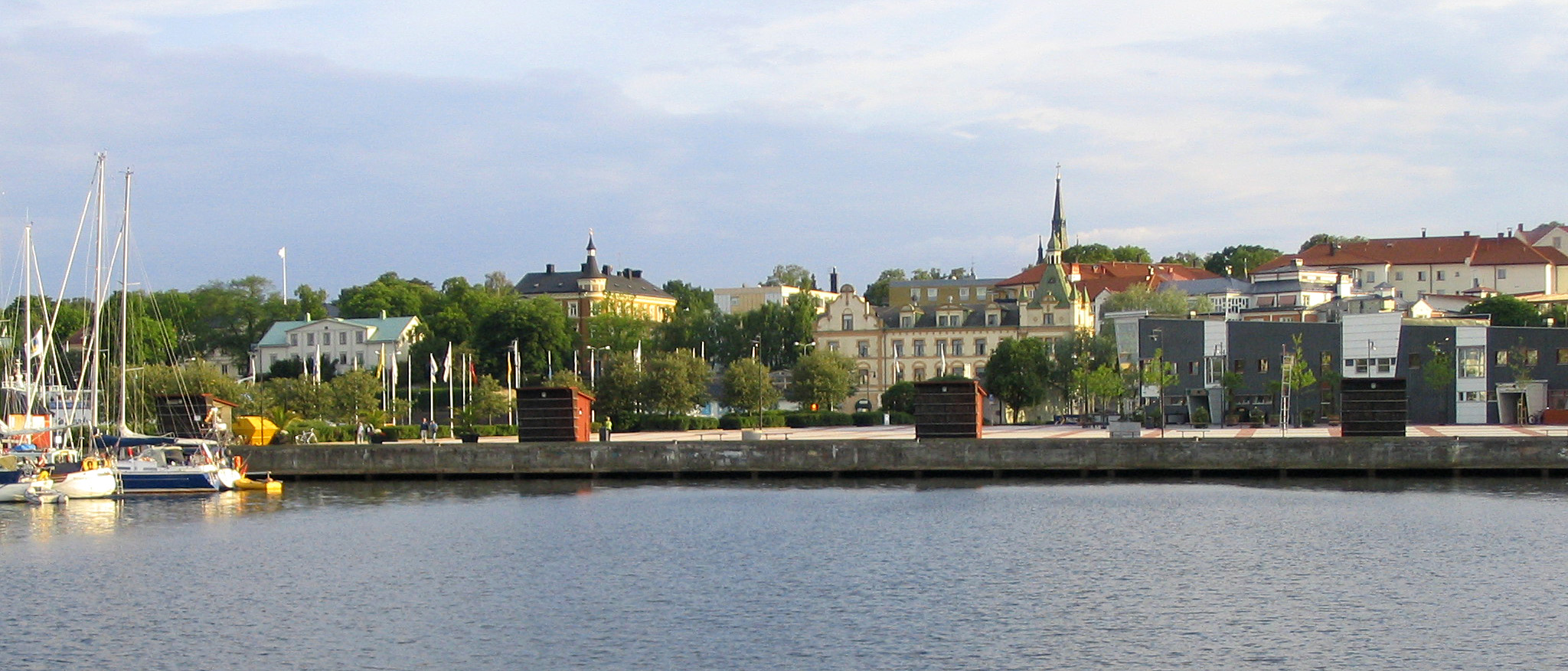
Oskarshamn.

== See also ==
- Oskarshamn Maritime Museum
- Oskarshamns Stadspark
- Oskarshamn archipelago
- Döderhultarn Museum
- Blå Jungfrun
- IK Oskarshamn hockey team
