= Liljeholmens Stearinfabriks AB =

Swedish candle manufacturer

Coordinates: 57°15′38″N 16°28′42″E

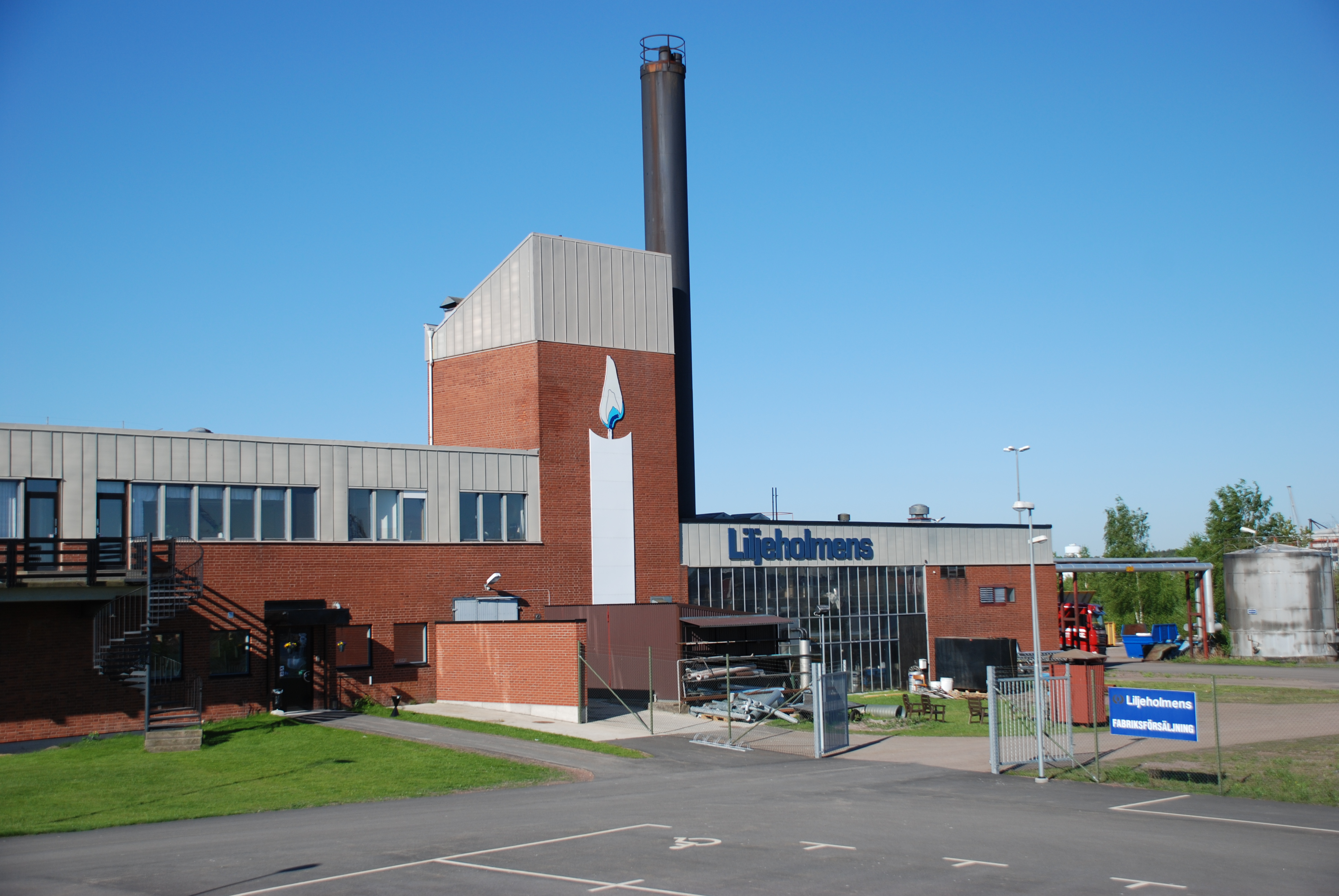
- Company type: Aktiebolag
- Industry: Candle manufacturer
- Founded: 1839
- Founder: Lars Johan Hierta
- Headquarters: Oskarshamn, Sweden
- Website: http://www.liljeholmens.se/

Liljeholmens Stearinfabriks AB is a Swedish candle manufacturer and supplier to the Swedish Royal House. The factory is located in Oskarshamn, Sweden.

== History ==
The company was founded in 1839 by Lars Johan Hierta, the same person who founded the Swedish daily newspaper Aftonbladet. Originally the factory was located to Stockholm but in 1970 a new factory and a factory outlet was built in coastal town Oskarshamn, in the south-east of Sweden.

== Production ==
Today the factory is the world's largest manufacturer specialized in stearin candles. The annual production is about 11 000 tons.

== Gallery ==
Inside the factory (around year 1900)
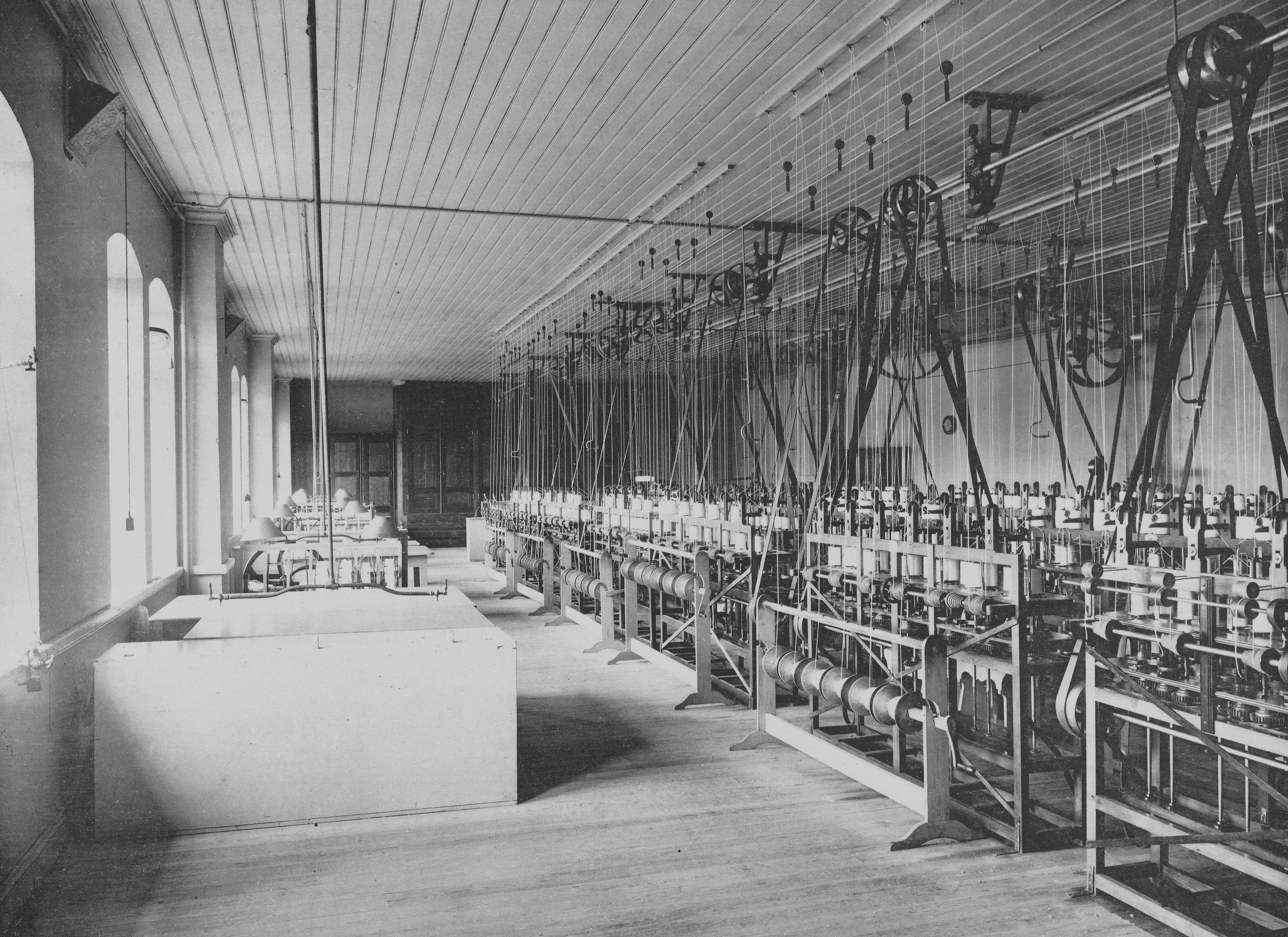

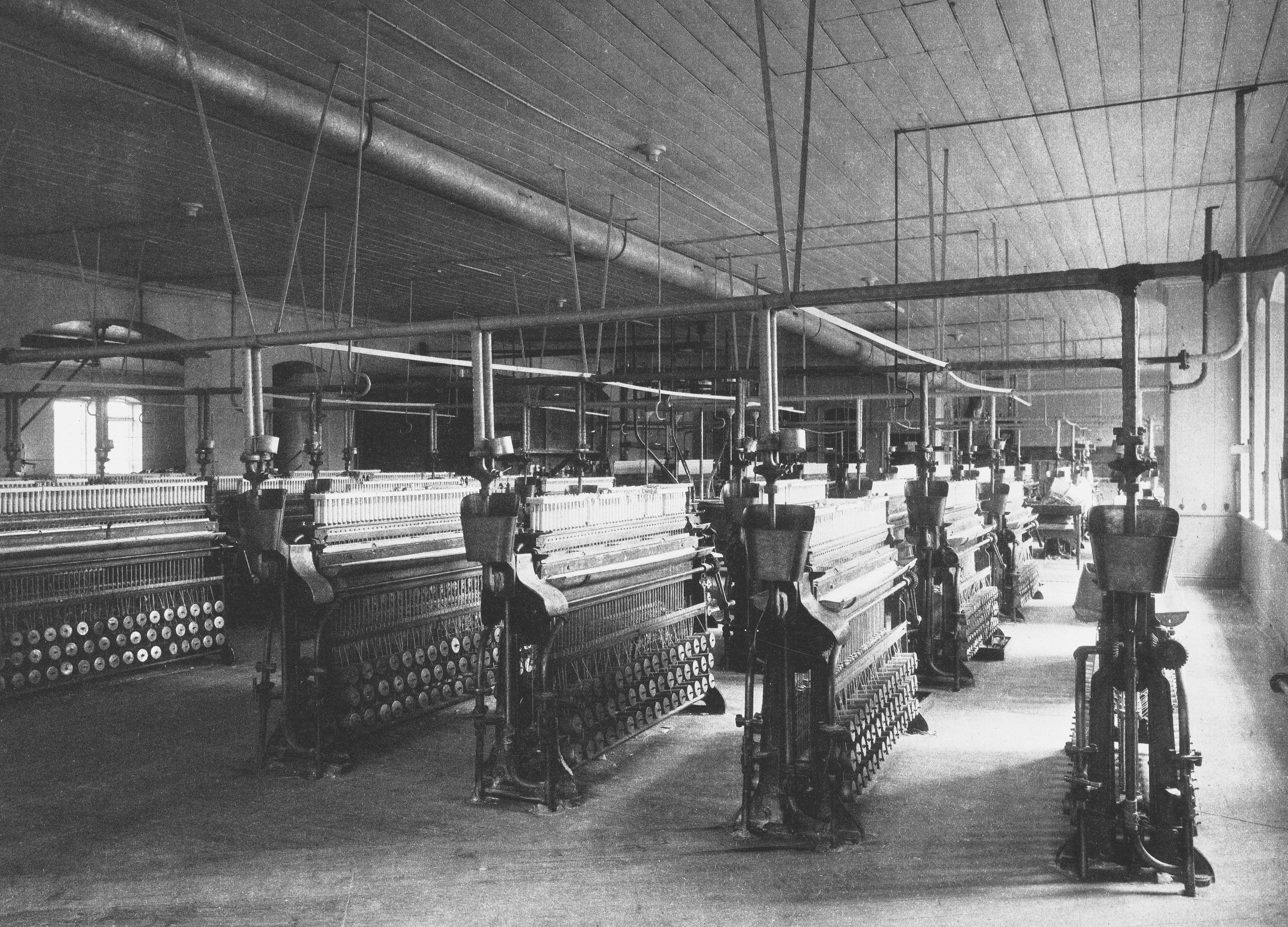

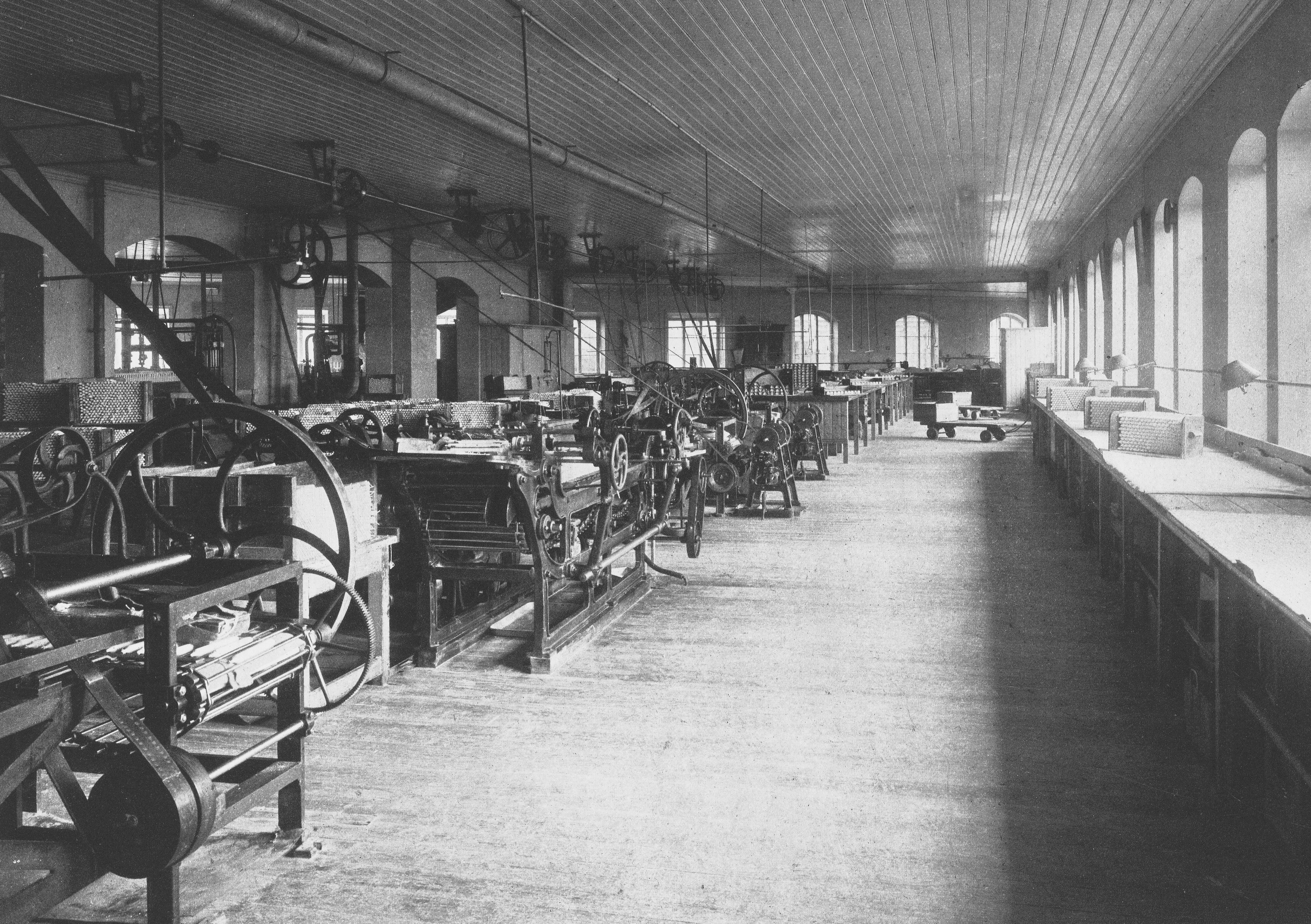

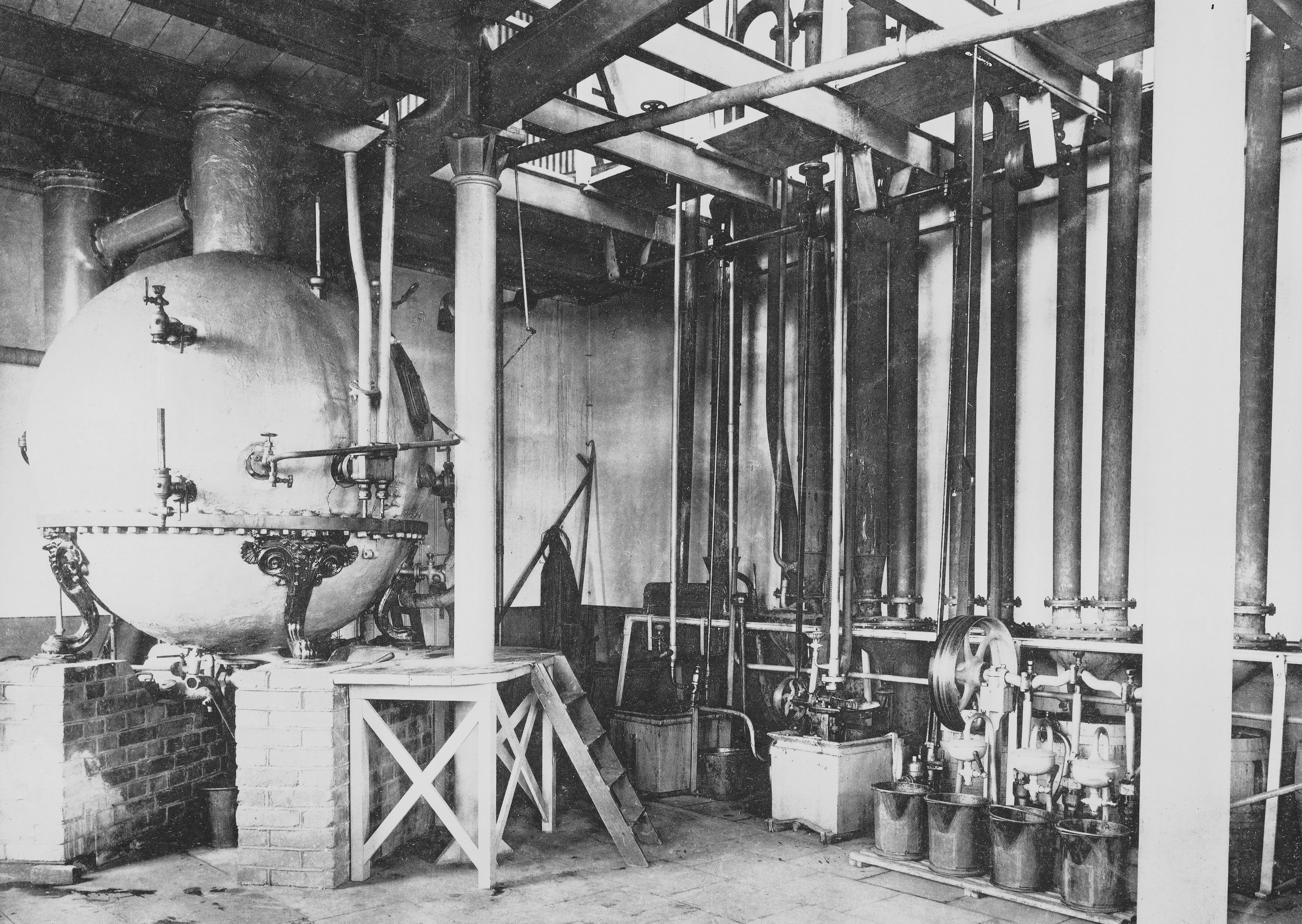

== See also ==
- List of royal warrant holders of the Swedish court
- History of candle making
