= Craftstaden IBK =

Floorball club in Oskarshamn, Sweden

- Logo used since 2006.
- Short name: CIBK
- Founded: 6 March 1986; 39 years ago
- Arena: Oskarshamns sporthall
- Manager: Niclas Lundström
Home colors	Away colors

Craftstaden IBK is a floorball club based in Oskarshamn, Sweden. It is one of the largest clubs in Småland, by number of active players. Several top players, including Kasper Hydén, have played for the club in the past.

== History ==
On 6 March 1986, a group of teenagers at Kristineberg Community Youth Center (Kristinebergs fritidsgård) founded the Oskarshamns Innebandyklubb. In 2006 however, the club was renamed to its current name. The current head manager and chairman of the club is Niclas Lundström. The club's home arena is the A-Hall of Oskarshamn Sports Center (Oskarshamns sporthalls A-hall), located at Oscarsgymnasiet in Oskarshamn.

Craftstaden have played numerous seasons among the highest national leagues, both in the men's and women's. On 4 February 2017, the club reached the Floorball All-Swedish attendance record when playing against FBC Kalmarsund at the BeGe Hockey Center. Currently, the Men's A-team and the Women's A-team play in the Swedish Division 4 North East (Division 4 Nordöstra) and the Women's All-Swedish South (Damallsvenskan Södra) respectively.

== Roster ==
In total, Craftstaden have dozens of teams by varying age groups, including the parasports team and the goalkeeper training programme.

=== Men's A-team ===
The head coach and manager of the Men's A-team is Stefan Johansson and Magnus Jonneryd respectively.

#	Nationality	Player	Position	Grip	Age	Acquired
	Sweden	Fabian Karlberg-Magnusson			19
	Sweden	Victor Olsson			29
	Sweden	Filip Mattsén			20
	Sweden	Daniel Sällqvist			41
	Sweden	Gabriel Moberg Adolfsson			26
	Sweden	Wilmer Magnusson			23
91	Sweden	Emil Wyckman	G		19
12	Sweden	Emil Erlandsson		R	22
	Sweden	Theodor Roth			19
	Sweden	Petter Tornedal			19
	Sweden	Alexander Konradsson			30
6	Sweden	Hannes Berggren			21
	Sweden	Simon Hjalmarsson			21
	Sweden	Noa Axelsson			19
	Sweden	Jakob Savolainen			24
	Sweden	Patrick Holm			19
	Sweden	Victor Magnusson			28
	Sweden	Edwin Magnusson			26
	Sweden	Oliver Moberg			20
	Sweden	Rasmus Johansson			26
4	Sweden	Hannes Axelsson		L	22
	Sweden	Albin Borg			30
81	Sweden	Alexander Aronsson Johansson			19
	Sweden	Milton Karlsson-Sundberg			18
	Sweden	Jakob Åsberg			19
	Sweden	Liam Fransson			18

=== Women's A-team ===
The head coach and manager of the Women's A-team is Mikael Thorn and Mattias Sundberg respectively.

#	Nationality	Player	Position	Grip	Age	Acquired
	Sweden	Ellen Eos			19
	Sweden	Sanna Zetterling			30
	Sweden	Maja Lindberg			18
	Sweden	Lisa Hultgren			23
	Sweden	Tindra Nordgren			22
	Sweden	Wilma Djurstedt			22
	Sweden	Elin Ljunggren			31
	Sweden	Linn Petersson			21
20	Sweden	Ida Fredriksson			22
	Sweden	Linda Zetterling			32
	Sweden	Ebba Selin			20
21	Sweden	Christine Borg			22
	Sweden	Lisa Sundberg Tisell			29
	Sweden	Stina Nilsson			23
	Sweden	Vilma Zetterling			23
	Sweden	Mathilda Zetterling			23
	Sweden	Elna Olsson			25
	Sweden	Ebba Sundberg Tisell			22
	Sweden	Antonia Jonsson			29
	Sweden	Linnéa Eos			29
98	Sweden	Fanny Sundberg Tisell			27
