= Port of Oskarshamn =

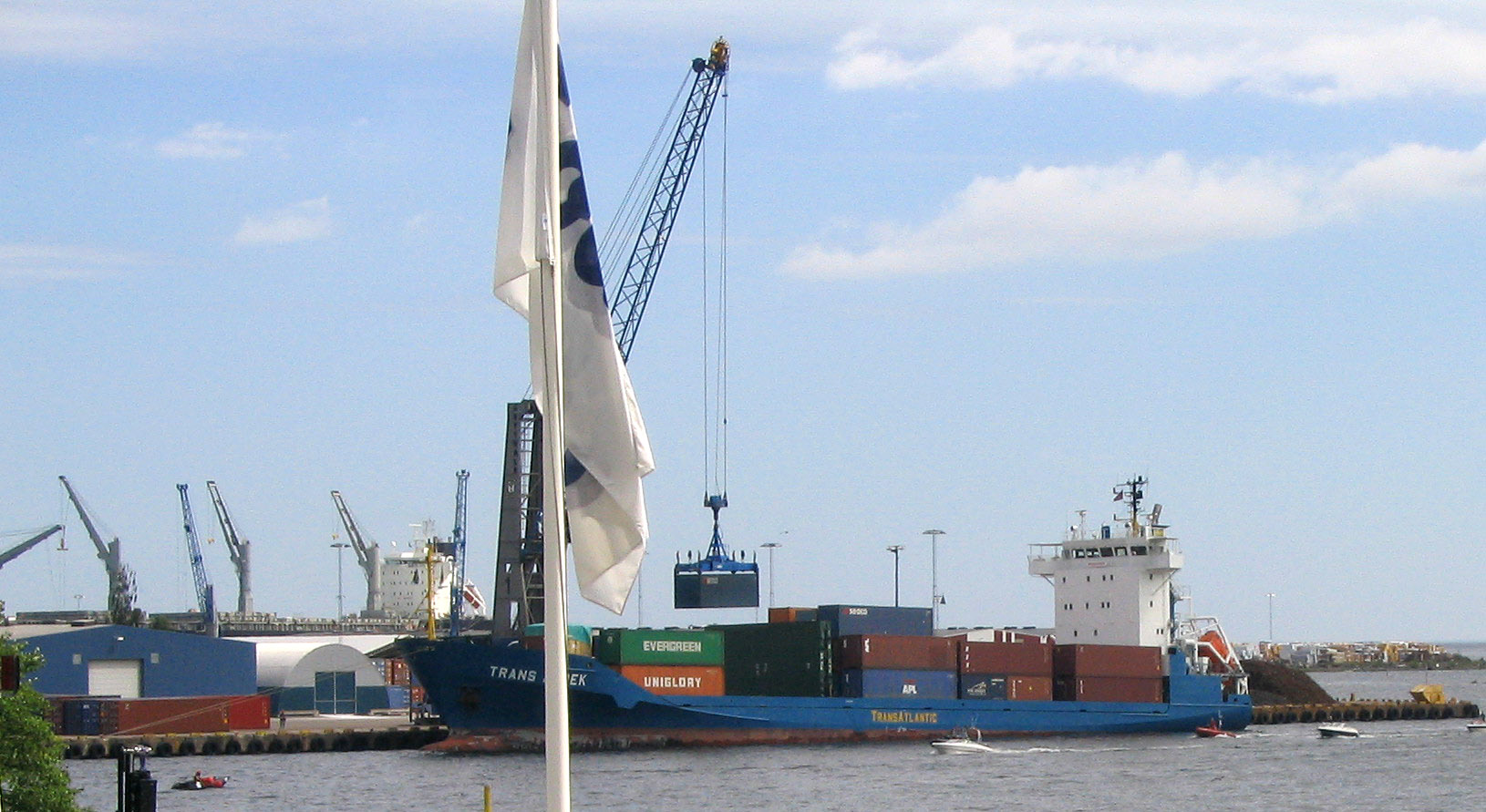
- Click on the map for a fullscreen view

Location
- Country: Sweden
- Location: Oskarshamn
- Coordinates: 57°16′01″N 16°28′05″E
- UN/LOCODE: SEOSK

Details
- Owned by: Oskarshamns Hamn AB
- Employees: 65 (2008)

Statistics
- Vessel arrivals: 771 (2008)
- Annual cargo tonnage: 1.4 million tons (2008)
- Passenger traffic: Gotland, 400 000 passengers per year
- Website http://www.port.oskarshamn.se/

Port of Oskarshamn is a seaport in Oskarshamn, Kalmar County, in southeastern Sweden.

== Cargo handling ==
The port handles most types of goods; containers, dry bulk cargo and wet bulk cargo. The facilities are: Total quay-length of 2.7 km, maximum depth 11 m, Roro-facilities, cranes, warehouses, oil and chemical storage.

== Shipyard ==
Oskarshamnsvarvet Sweden AB is a shipyard operating on the south side of the harbor. The shipyard was first established in 1863 and has launched about 500 ships in total. The shipyard is equipped with floating drydock, gantry crane, slipway and 318 m of quay.

== Passenger traffic ==
From the port there are also ferry lines to Gotland, Öland and national park Blå Jungfrun.

== See also ==
- Ports of the Baltic Sea
