= Misterhult =

- Location within Kalmar Location within Sweden
- Coordinates: 57°28′N 16°33′E
- Country: Sweden
- Province: Småland
- County: Kalmar County
- Municipality: Oskarshamn Municipality

Area
  - Total: 0.36 km^{2} (0.14 sq mi)

Population (31 December 2010)
  - Total: 203
  - Density: 569/km^{2} (1,470/sq mi)
- Time zone: UTC+1 (CET)
  - Summer (DST): UTC+2 (CEST)

Misterhult is a locality situated in Oskarshamn Municipality, Kalmar County, Sweden with 203 inhabitants in 2010.
