= Harley Refsal =

American woodcarver (1944–2024)

Harley Refsal (December 25, 1944 – September 8, 2024) was an American internationally recognized figure carver, specializing in Scandinavian flat-plane style of woodcarving.

== Background ==
Refsal was born on December 25, 1944 and raised on a farm near Hoffman, Minnesota, which was homesteaded by his Norwegian-immigrant grandparents. He began working in wood as a young boy. His father, a carpenter and farmer, and a woodworker uncle who lived nearby kept him well supplied with wood, tools, and encouragement.

Refsal died on September 8, 2024, at the age of 79.

== Career ==
Refsal lived in Norway in the 1960s and again in the 1980s, and has traveled extensively throughout Scandinavia. Upon retiring from full-time teaching at Luther College, Decorah, Iowa in 2010, he held the title Professor Emeritus of Scandinavian Folk Art. Since the 1980s, Refsal, who spoke fluent Norwegian, shared his knowledge of and skills in Scandinavian-style flat-plane figure carving with thousands of carvers through courses and presentations in North America and in Scandinavia.

Refsal was an Emeritus Member of the Caricature Carvers of America. In 1996 he was decorated by H.M. Harald V, King of Norway, receiving the St. Olav's Medal, in recognition of his role in reinvigorating and popularizing Scandinavian figure carving in both North America and Norway. Refsal taught carving at a variety of course centers through the U.S., including Vesterheim Museum, Decorah, IA; North House Folk School, Grand Marais, MN; Milan Village Arts School, Milan, MN; Norsk Wood Works, Barronett, WI; and the John C. Campbell Folk School, Brasstown, NC.

He was named 2012 Woodcarver of the Year by Woodcarving Illustrated Magazine.

== Education ==
- B.A., Augsburg College, Minneapolis, Minnesota
- Eksamen Filosophicum, University of Oslo
- M. Div., Luther Theological Seminary, St. Paul, Minnesota
- Cand. Mag., Telemark University College, Rauland, Norway

== Publications ==
- Refsal, Harley (2004). Art & Technique of Scandinavian Style Woodcarving. Fox Chapel Publishing, East Petersburg, PA. p. 137. ISBN 1-56523-230-5.
- Refsal, Harley (2011). Whittling Little Folk. Fox Chapel Publishing, East Petersburg, PA. ISBN 978-1-56523-518-2.
- Refsal, Harley (1992). Woodcarving in the Scandinavian Style. Sterling Publishing Co., Inc., New York, New York. p. 128. ISBN 0-8069-8633-6.
