= Oskarshamn Maritime Museum =

Coordinates: 57°15′47″N 16°26′46.4″E

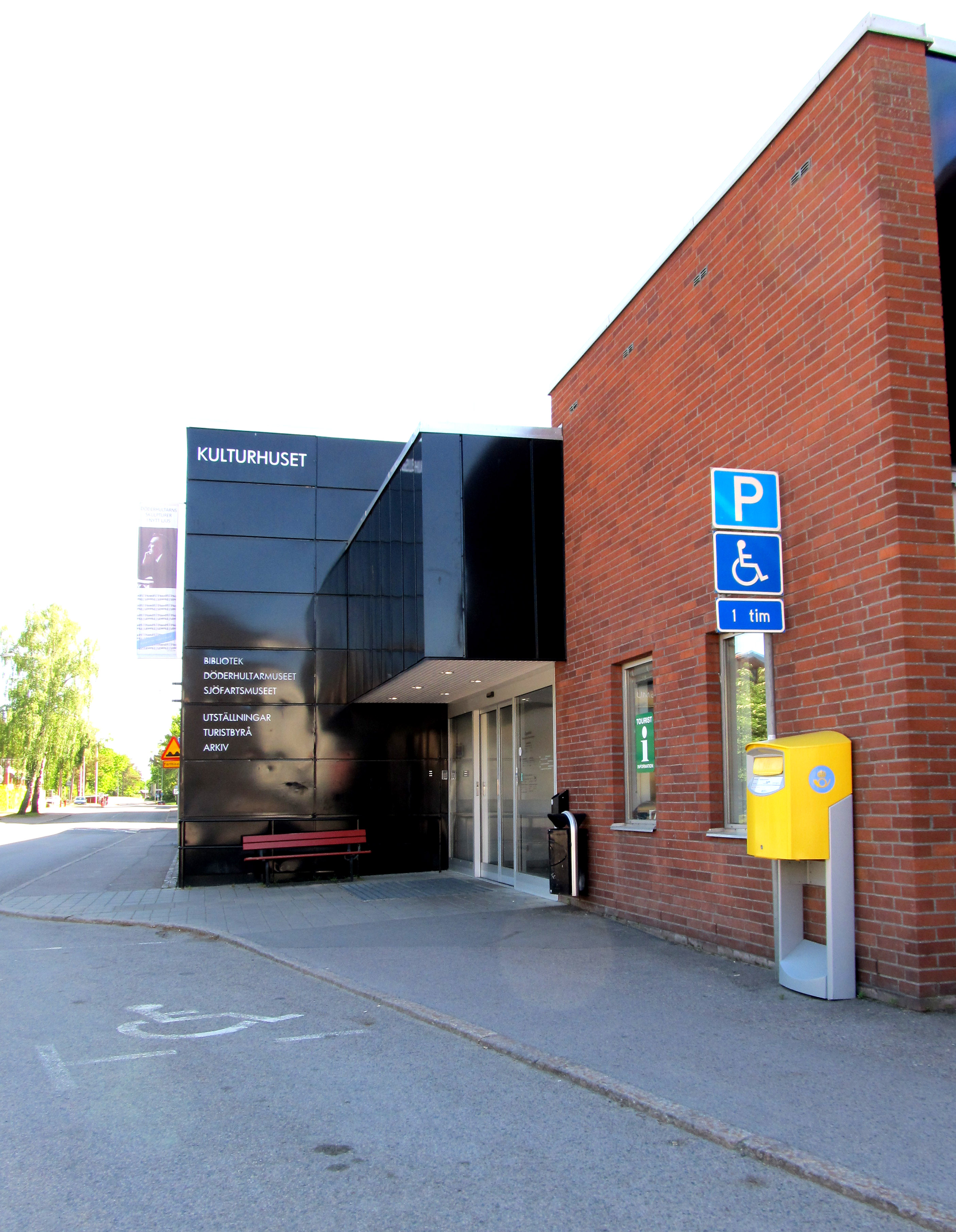
- The main museum at Kulturhuset in Oskarshamn.
- Established: 1954
- Location: Kulturhuset at Hantverksgatan 18 in Oskarshamn, Sweden
- Type: Maritime Museum
- Website: Oskarshamn Maritime Museum

The Oskarshamn Maritime Museum is located in Oskarshamn, Sweden. The Museum exhibits items related to the merchandise shipping and shipbuilding activity in the Oskarshamn area.

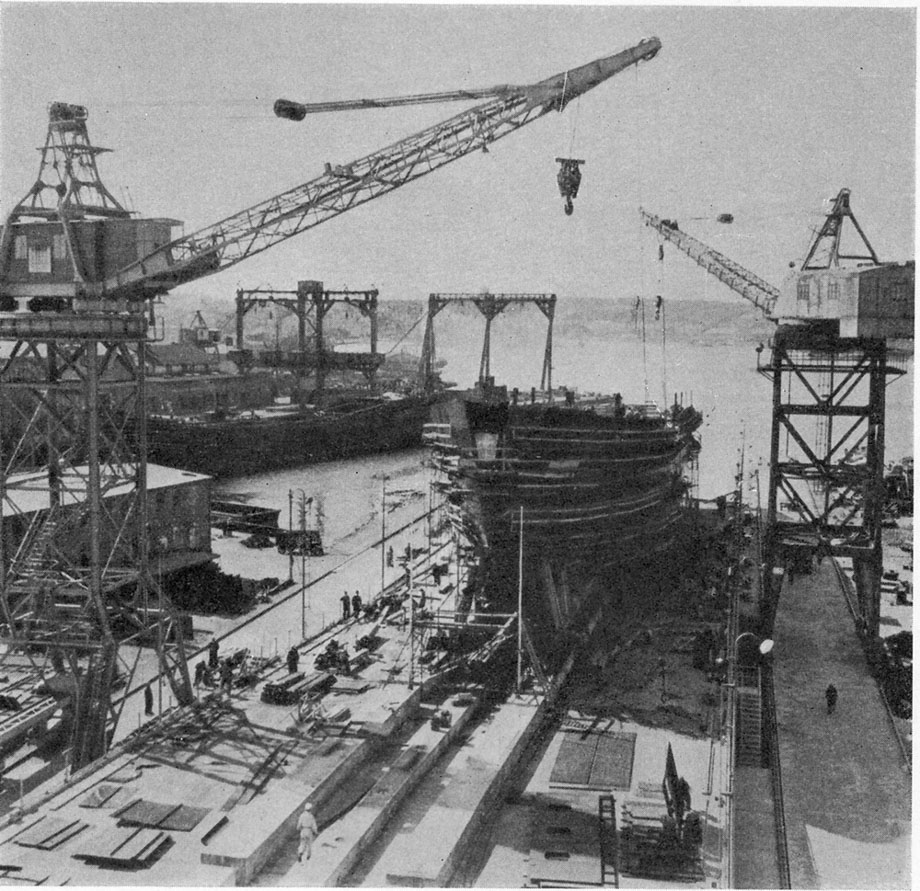
Part of the exhibition is related to the history of Oskarshamn Shipyard, here at a photograph from the 1930s.

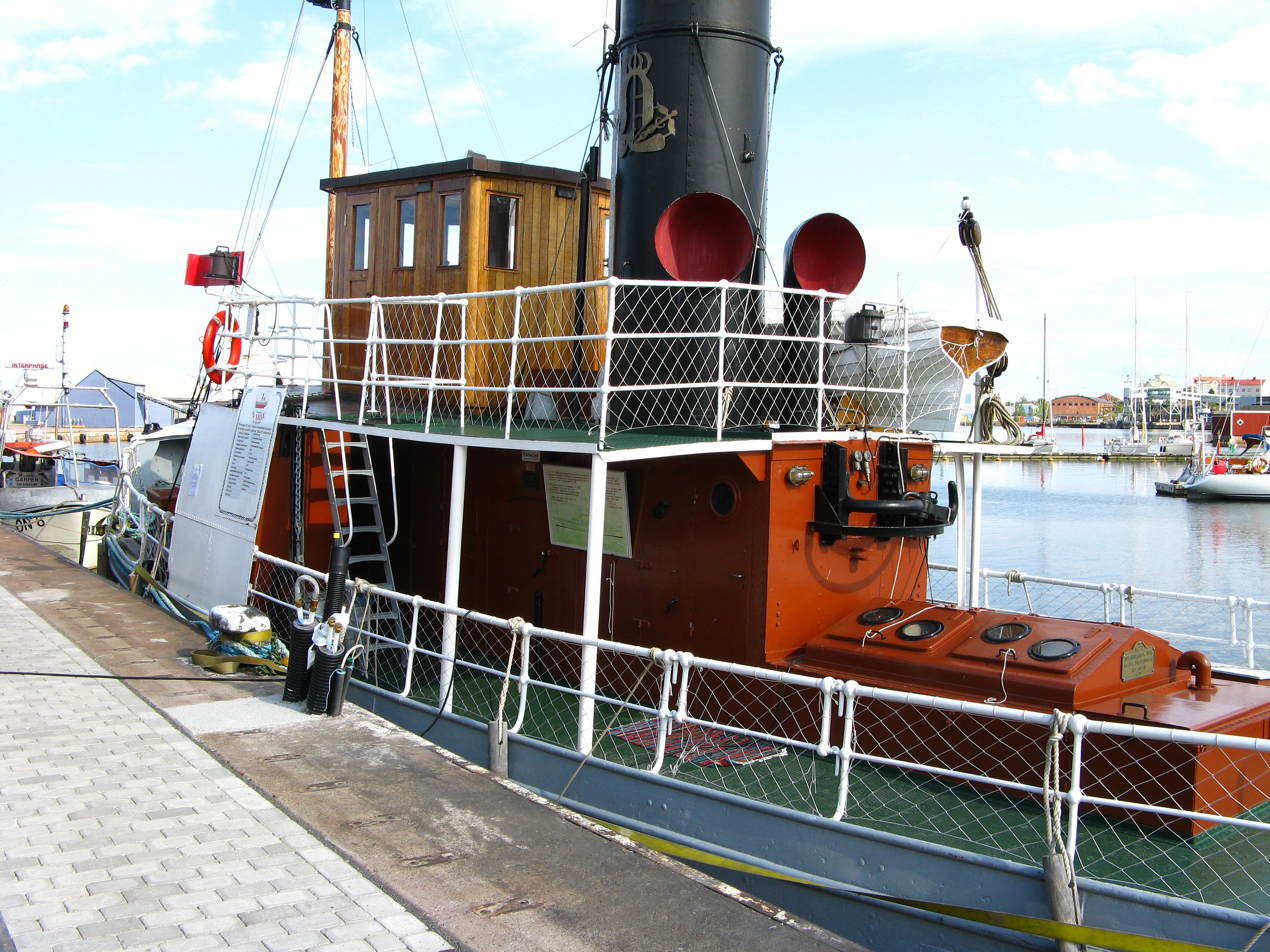
Tugboat S/S Nalle was built at the Oskarshamn Shipyard in 1923 and now serves as a museum ship in the harbour of Oskarshamn.

== History ==
The Oskarshamn Maritime Museum was founded in 1954. The main part of the exhibition is located to Kulturhuset at Hantverksgatan 18 in the central parts of Oskarshamn. The Museum was completely remodeled in 2012.

In 2009 a new branch of the museum was opened in a building at the harbour-area, exhibiting the marine steam engine from 1912 that once powered the SS Gustafsberg VII, as well as a number of smaller wooden boats. The tugboat S/S Nalle moored nearby, is also a part of the museum. The S/S Nalle was built and launched at the Oskarshamn Shipyard in 1923.

== Collection ==
The main museum at Kulturhuset exhibits a large collection of ship models and ship portraits, as well as navigational equipment, photographs, nautical charts, films, books and ship construction drawings. There are also items related to the ferry traffic between Oskarshamn and Visby, which has been going on since more than a century.

== See also ==
- Oskarshamn Shipyard
- Port of Oskarshamn
