= MS Juno =

Listed historic ship of Sweden, built in 1874

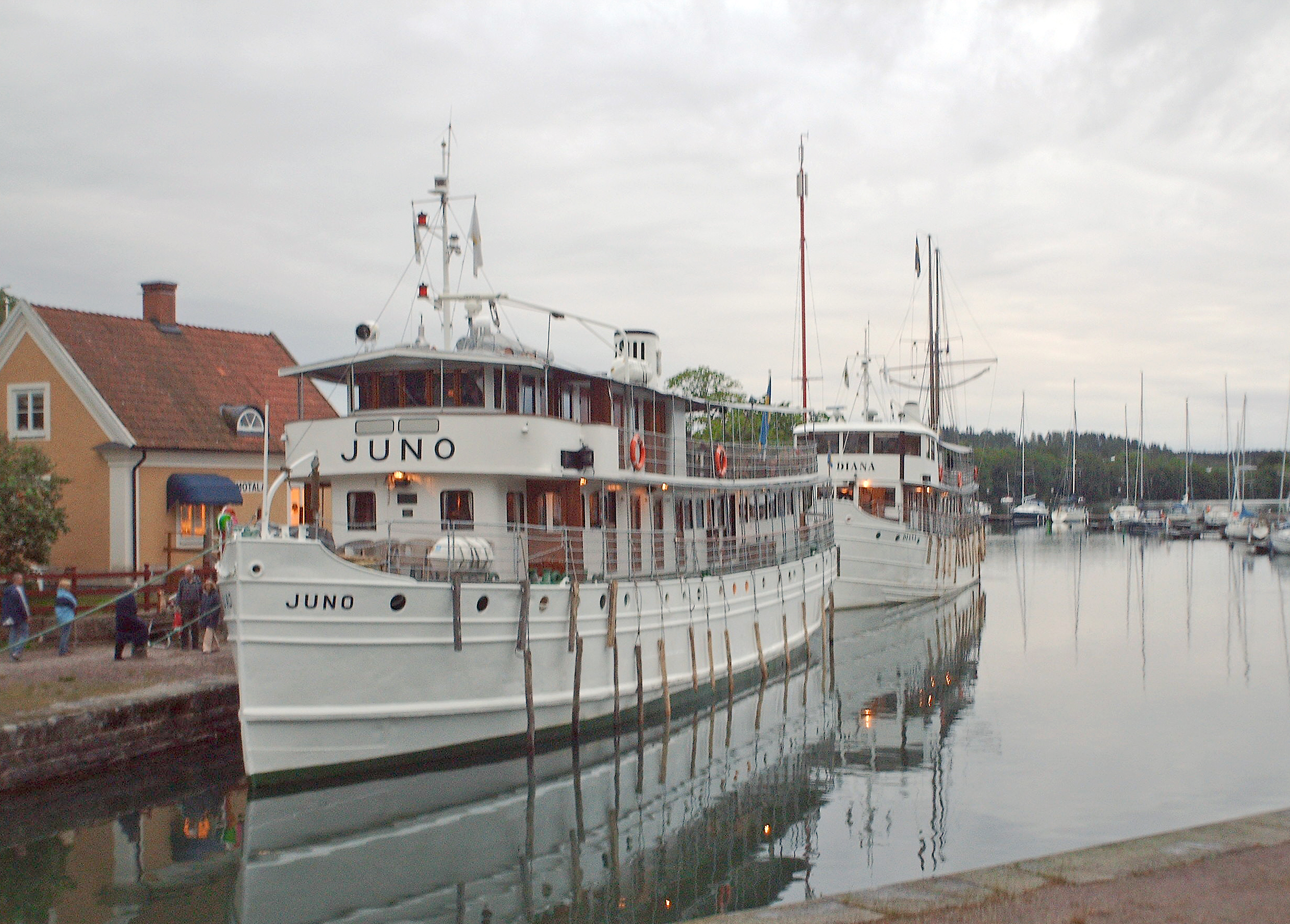
- Juno in Motala

History
- Name: Juno
- Builder: Motala Verkstad, Sweden
- Launched: 1874
- Identification: IMO number: 8634132
- Status: In service

General characteristics
- Type: Passenger ship
- Length: 31.45 m (103 ft 2 in)
- Beam: 6.87 m (22 ft 6 in)
- Draught: 2.72 m (8 ft 11 in)
- Speed: 10 knots (19 km/h; 12 mph)

MS Juno is a Swedish motor vessel, and former steam ship, that was built in 1874 at Motala for the Göta canal. M/S Juno is the world’s oldest registered cruising ship. The ship has 29 cabins on three decks. The dining room with a lounge is found on the middle deck (shelter deck) and the upper deck (bridge deck) offers a covered aft deck with a perfect view. She is a listed historic ship of Sweden.
