= MV Angantyr =

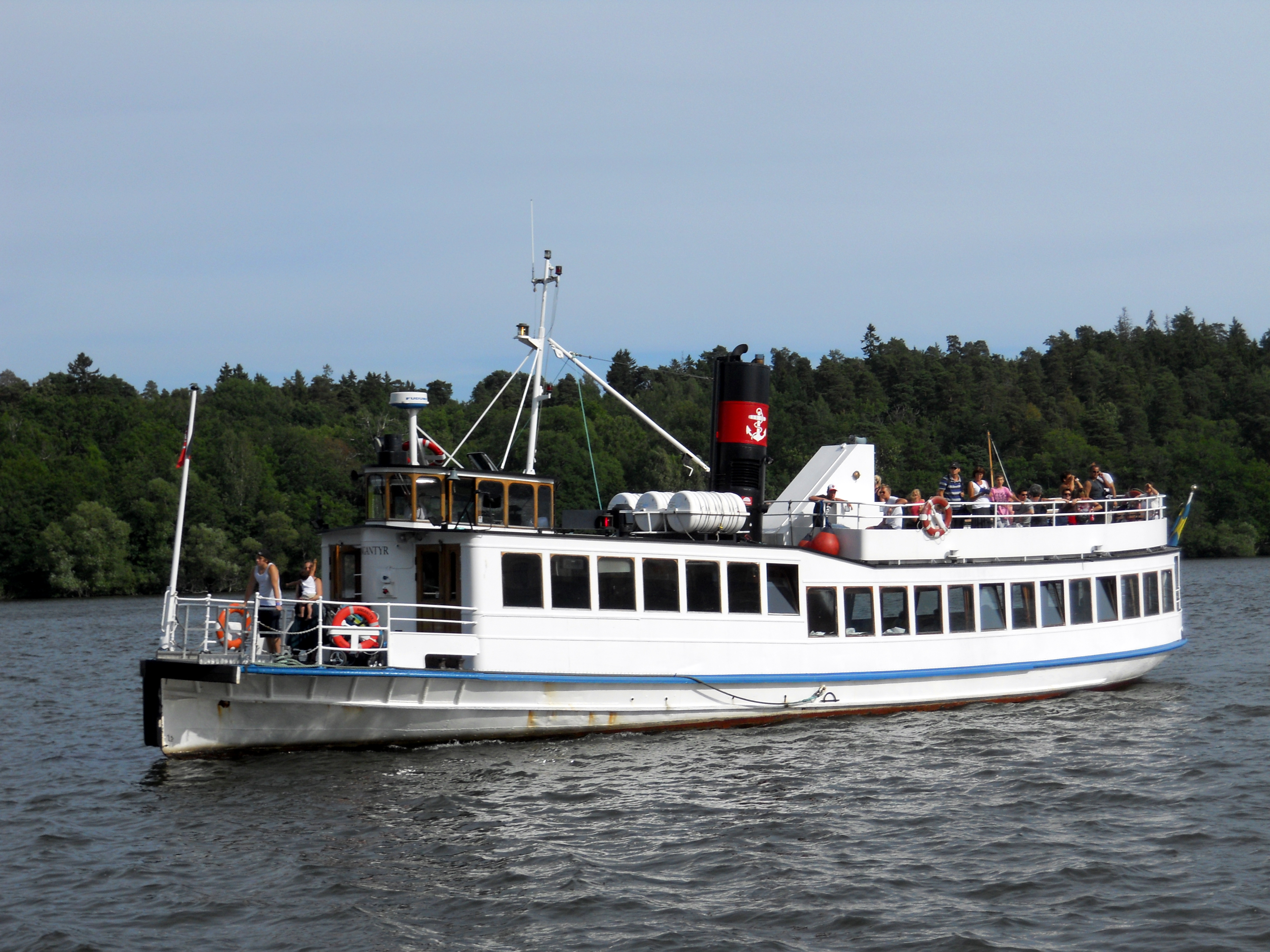
- Angantyr approaching Drottningholm in 2010

History
- Name: Angantyr
- Owner: Stockholms Ångslups (1909-1968); Waxholmsbolaget (1968-1978); Various - see text (1978-1988); Strömma Kanalbolaget (1988-)
- Builder: Motala Verkstads Nya AB, Sweden
- Launched: 1909

General characteristics
- Type: Passenger ferry
- Length: 23.16 m (76 ft 0 in)
- Beam: 5.6 m (18 ft 4 in)
- Draught: 1.9 m (6 ft 3 in)
- Speed: 10 knots (19 km/h; 12 mph)

The Angantyr is a Swedish motor vessel, and former steam ship, that was built in 1909 at Motala Verkstads Nya AB. She now operates cruises and charters for the Strömma Kanalbolaget and is a listed historic ship of Sweden.

== History ==
Angantyr was built as a steam ship by the Motala Verkstads Nya AB in Motala and delivered in May 1909 to the Stockholms Ångslups AB (Stockholm Steam Launch AB) of Stockholm for use on Lake Malaren. She was a sister ship to Valkyrian (now Drottningholm), built the same year, and was initially used on a service from Stockholm to the Essingen Islands. She was rebuilt in 1914 with an upper deck superstructure, but this was removed again in 1949, and she now has the open upper deck that she was built with.

In 1941, the Angantyr was transferred to the Stockholm archipelago, operating services between Möja, Sandhamn, Runmarö, Nämdö and Utö. In 1955, her original steam engine was replaced by a diesel engine. In 1968, she was sold to Waxholms Nya Ångfartygs AB, better known as Waxholmsbolaget, who employed her on routes from Stockholm to Möja and Stockholm to Stora Saxaren and Lilla Saxaren.

In 1978, the Angantyr was sold to Drottningholms Ångfartygs AB, who hired her to Ångfartygs AB Strömma Kanal, better known as Strömma Kanalbolaget. The following year she was sold to a private individual, but remained on hire to Strömma Kanalbolaget. In 1983, she was re-engined with a new diesel engine. The same year she returned to her original route from Stockholm to the Essingen Islands, running a commuter service that she remained on until 2003. In 1988, she was purchased by Strömma Kanalbolaget.

== Operation ==
The Angantyr is operated by Strömma Kanalbolaget in the Stockholm area on cruises through Lake Malaren and the Stockholm archipelago. She has a length of 23.16 metres (76.0 ft), a beam of 5.6 metres (18 ft) and a draft of 1.9 metres (6 ft 3 in). She has a top speed of 10 knots (19 km/h; 12 mph) and carries 148 passengers.
