= Saxaren =

Saxaren may refer to:

- SS Saxaren, a 1912-built Swedish steamship that now operates as MV Gustafsberg VII
- MV Saxaren, a 1999-built passenger ferry in the fleet of the Waxholmsbolaget in Sweden
