= MV Stegeholm =

Strömma Kanalbolaget passenger ferry and listed historic motor launch in Sweden

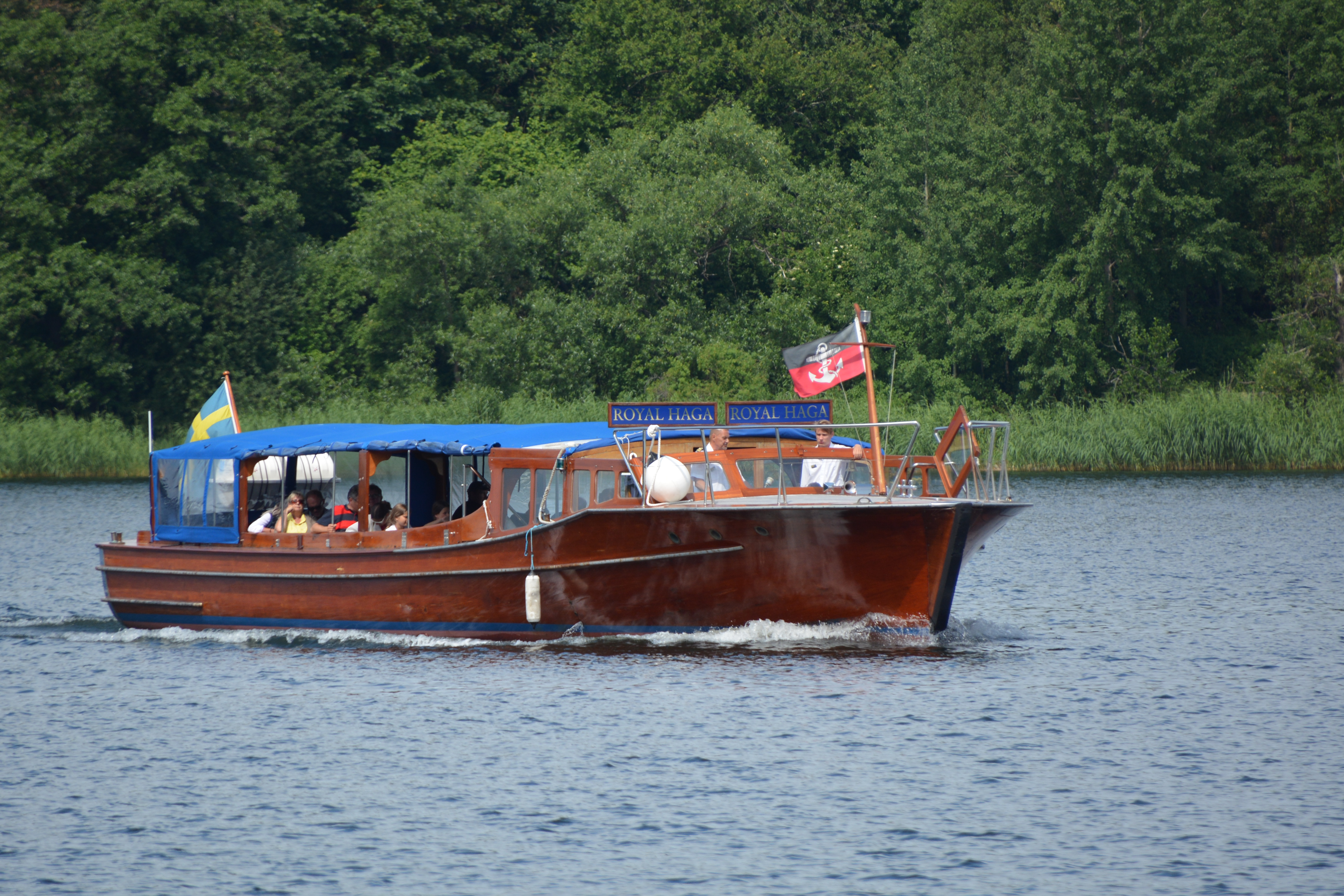
- Stegeholm on the Brunnsviken in 2015

History
- Name: Queen Mary (1950–1960); Stella-Fors (1960–1964); Forsman 9 (1964–1984); Bellman 4 (1984–1985); Wasaholm 2 (1985–1988); Stegeholm (1988–present)
- Owner: Various - see text (1950–1992); Strömma Kanalbolaget (1992–present)
- Builder: Rosättra Båtvarv, Norrtälje, Sweden
- Launched: 1950

General characteristics
- Type: Motor launch
- Length: 18.06 m (59 ft 3 in)
- Beam: 3.97 m (13 ft 0 in)
- Draught: 1.1 m (3 ft 7 in)
- Speed: 10 knots (19 km/h; 12 mph)

Stegeholm is a Swedish sightseeing motor launch that was built in 1950 as the Queen Mary, and has also been known as the Stella-Fors, Forsman 9, Bellman 4 and Wasaholm 2. Given her current name in 1988, she now operates sightseeing trips for the Strömma Kanalbolaget. Built in mahogany, she is one of the last open wooden sightseeing boats operating in Stockholm, and is a listed historic ship of Sweden.

== History ==
Queen Mary was built by the Rosättra Båtvarv in Norrtälje and delivered in 1950 to Bertil Sjöberg for use on sightseeing boat services in Stockholm. In 1960 she was sold to Forsmans Trafik & Taxibåtar and renamed Stella-Fors. In 1964 she was transferred to Forsman Sightseeing AB and renamed Forsman 9. In 1984 she was sold to Tourist Sightseeing AB and renamed Bellman 4. The following year she was sold to Bröderna Rais Skärgårdsturer and renamed Wasaholm 2, before being renamed Stegeholm in 1988. In 1992 she was bought by Ångfartygs AB Strömma Kanal, better known as Strömma Kanalbolaget.

Despite the changes in name and ownership, the Stegeholm continued to operate similar services. In 2010, she initiated a new hop-on, hop-off sightseeing service on the Brunnsviken, a lake in Stockholm that is surrounded by parks and interesting buildings, most notably the Haga Park and Haga Palace.

== Operation ==
The Stegeholm is operated by Strömma Kanalbolaget on tourist sightseeing services in the Stockholm area. She has a length of 18.06 metres (59 ft 3 in), a beam of 3.97 metres (13 ft 0 in) and a draught of 1.1 metres (3 ft 7 in). She has a top speed of 10 knots (19 km/h; 12 mph) and carries 75 passengers.
