= MV Enköping =

Strömma Kanalbolaget passenger ferry and listed historic ship in Sweden

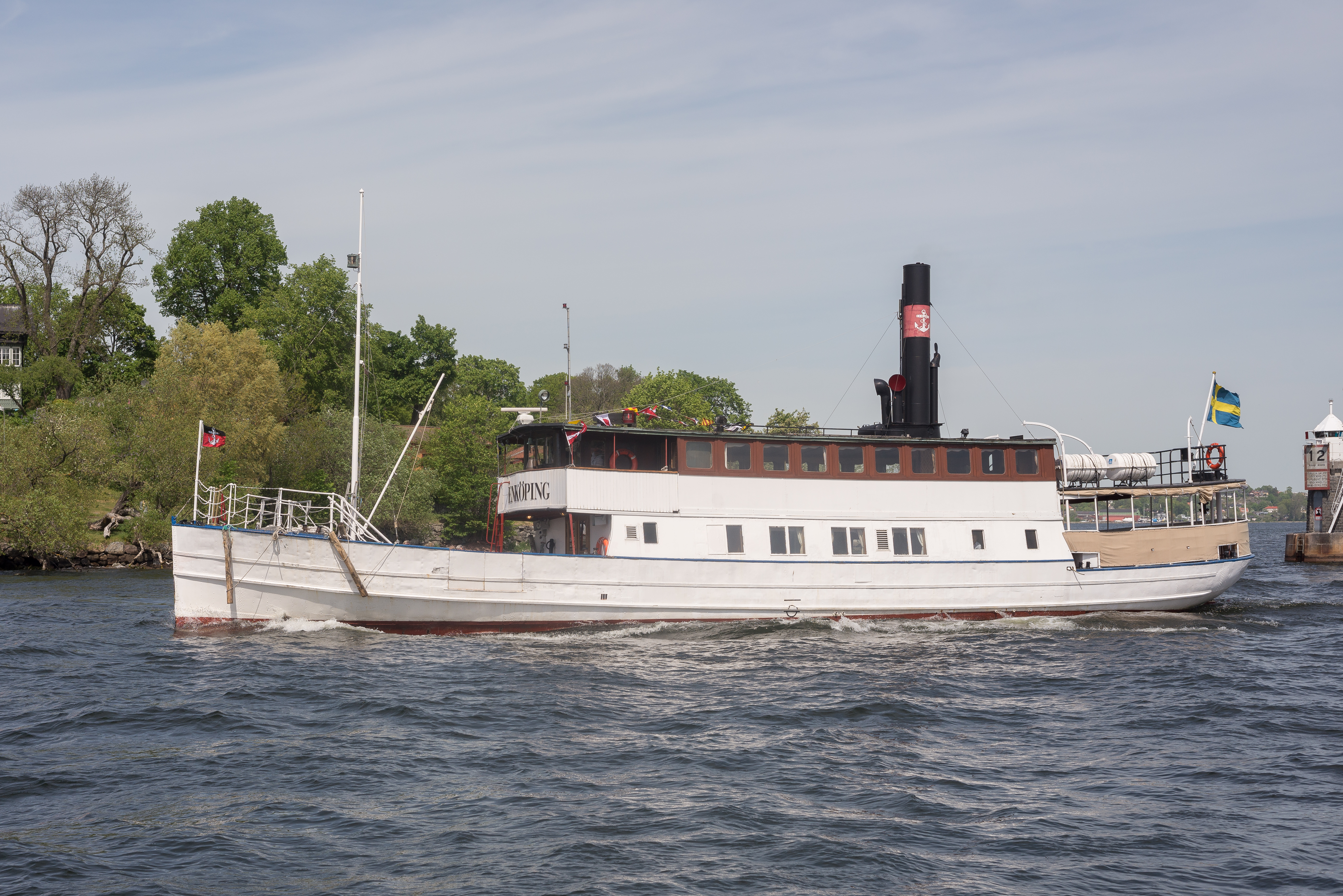
- Enköping passing Blockhusudden in 2017

History
- Name: Enköping (1868-1885); Various - see text (1885-1990); Enköping (1990-)
- Owner: Various - see text (1868-1990); Strömma Kanalbolaget (1990-)
- Builder: Oskarshamn Shipyard, Sweden
- Launched: 1868
- Identification: IMO number: 5334755

General characteristics
- Type: Passenger ferry
- Length: 30.33 m (99 ft 6 in)
- Beam: 5.45 m (17 ft 11 in)
- Draught: 2.4 m (7 ft 10 in)
- Speed: 9 knots (17 km/h; 10 mph)

The Enköping is a Swedish motor vessel, and former steam ship, that was built in 1868 at Oskarshamn. Over the years, she has operated under the names Östhammar, Skokloster, Arholma, Väddö, Glafsfjorden, Södra Skärgården and Soten. In 1948 she was converted to diesel power. In 1990 Strömma Kanalbolaget bought her, and she is now used for tourist services on Lake Malaren and in the Stockholm archipelago. According to her owners, she is the oldest passenger ship still in service in the Lloyd's Register of Shipping, and she is a listed historic ship of Sweden.

== History ==
Enköping was built as a steam ship by the Oskarshamn Shipyard in Oskarshamn and launched on the 20 June 1868. She was delivered to the Bockholmssunds Ångfartygsbolag of Stockholm for service on the route from Stockholm to Enköping via Lake Malaren. Despite several changes of ownership, she continued to operate on this route until 1885.

Enköping was sold to Ångfartygs AB Östhammar in 1885, for use in the Stockholm archipelago on the Stockholm to Östhammar route, and taking the name Östhammar. In 1889 she was given a new engine and boiler. In November 1899 she went aground outside Herräng and suffered significant damage. The following year, and still unrepaired, she was sold to Ångfartygs AB Sigtuna and renamed Skokloster. After repair, she returned to Lake Mälaren to operate a service from Stockholm to Örsundsbro via Sigtuna.

In 1911 Skokloster was sold to Ångfartygs AB Sylfid of Norrtälje and renamed Arholma. Her new owners returned her to the Stockholm archipelago and she was put into service on the Stockholm to Arholma service. She received a new boiler in 1912, but the following year was sold to Carl Gustaf Grönstedt, also of Norrtälje, and renamed Väddö. She ran on the Stockholm to Väddö route.

Väddö was sold to Ångfartygs AB Glafsfjorden of Arvika in 1915 and renamed Glafsfjorden. Her new owners used her on their services on the Glafsfjorden, a freshwater lake in the Värmland region of Sweden that has navigable access to the sea via Lake Vänern and the Göta Canal. In 1919 she was sold to Ångbåts AB Byelfven, also of Arvika, and renovated, with the fitting of new roofs and sides, together with a new steam engine.

In 1935 Glafsfjorden was sold to a group of individuals in Styrsö, an island off the west coast of Sweden. She was renamed Södra Skärgården, and put into service between Gothenburg and Styrsö. In 1943 she was renamed Soten and in 1948 her steam engine was replaced with a diesel engine. In 1971 she was re-engined, and in 1978 sold to Rederi AB Soten of Kungshamn, who operated her on a service from Lysekil to Kungshamn. In 1990, she was sold to Ångfartygs AB Strömma Kanal, better known as Strömma Kanalbolaget, who returned her to her original name of Enköping and to the waters of Lake Malaren.

== Operation ==
The Enköping is operated by Strömma Kanalbolaget in the Stockholm area on cruises through Lake Malaren and the Stockholm archipelago. She has a length of 30.33 metres (99.5 ft), a beam of 5.45 metres (17.9 ft) and a draft of 2.4 metres (7 ft 10 in). She has a top speed of 9 knots (17 km/h; 10 mph) and carries 148 passengers.
