= MV Gustafsberg VII =

Strömma Kanalbolaget passenger ferry built in Sweden in 1912

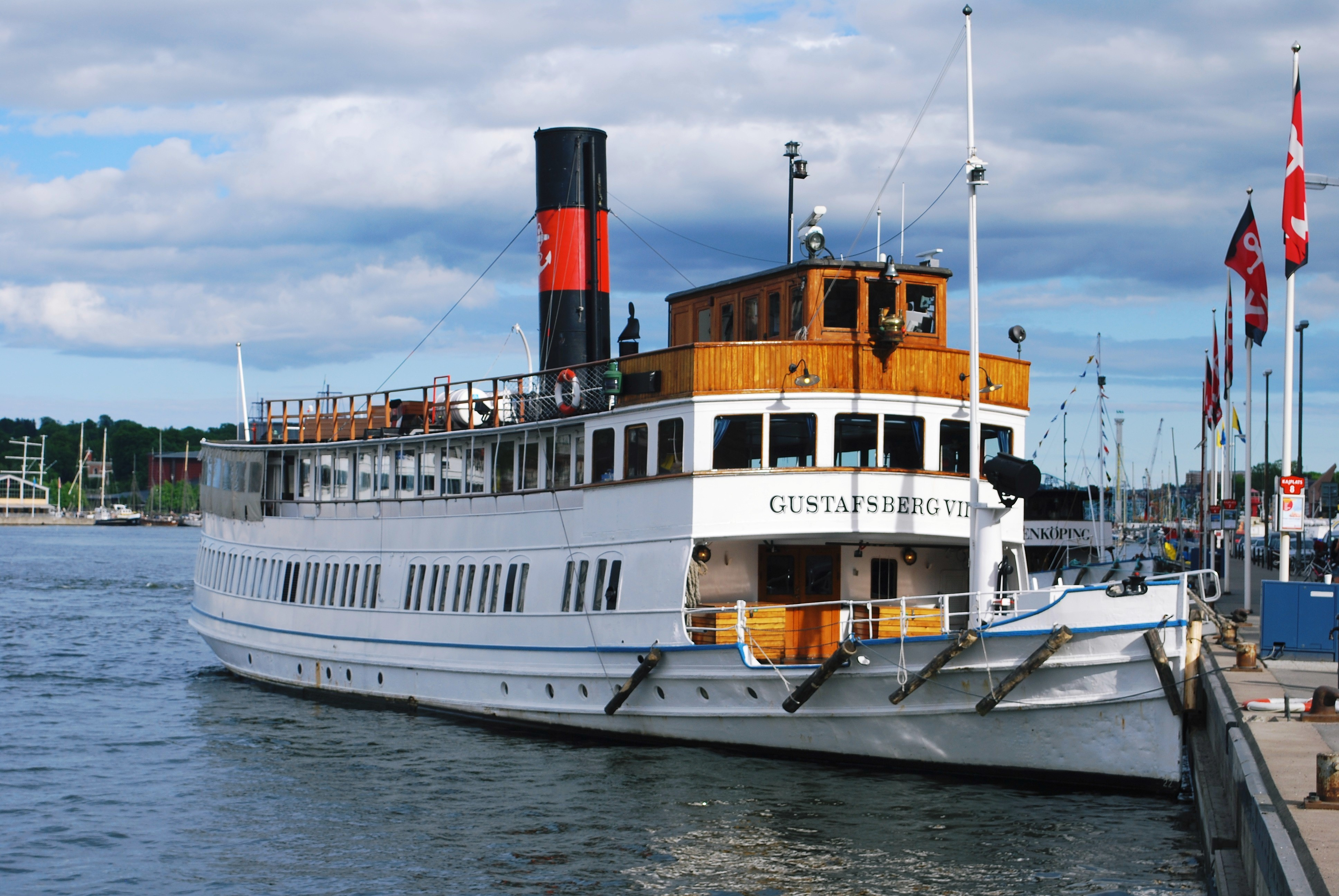
- Gustafsberg VII moored on Stockholm's Nybrokajen in 2011

History
- Name: Gustafsberg VII (1912-c.1925); Gustavsberg VII (c.1925-1929); Saxaren (1929-1974); Gustafsberg VII (1974-)
- Owner: Gustavsbergs fabriker (1912-1929); Waxholmsbolaget (1929-1964); Various (1964-1973); Strömma Kanalbolaget (1973-)
- Builder: Oskarshamn Shipyard, Sweden
- Acquired: 1912
- Maiden voyage: 1912
- Out of service: 1964-1966
- Identification: IMO number: 5314937

General characteristics
- Type: Passenger ferry
- Tonnage: 266 GRT
- Length: 34.66 m (113 ft 9 in)
- Beam: 7.11 m (23 ft 4 in)
- Draught: 2.5 m (8 ft 2 in)
- Speed: 13.5 knots (25.0 km/h; 15.5 mph)

Gustafsberg VII is a motor vessel, and former steam ship, that was built in 1912 at Oskarshamn. In 1929 she was sold to Waxholmsbolaget. After being written off in a sinking accident in 1964, she was bought by steamship enthusiasts, salvaged and restored. In 1973, Strömma Kanalbolaget bought the ship. She was converted to diesel power in 1985, and is now used for tourist services in the Stockholm archipelago. Over the years, she has also operated under the names Gustavsberg VII and Saxaren.

== History ==
Gustafsberg VII was ordered by the Gustavsberg porcelain factory, principally to transport their products from their factory, She was built as a steam ship by the Oskarshamn Shipyard in Oskarshamn and was delivered to the Gustavsberg factory in May 1912. She ran on a route between Stockholm and Gustavsberg via the Skurusundet. In around 1925, the spelling of the name was changed to Gustavsberg VII. In December 1929, she was purchased by Waxholms Nya Ångfartygs AB, better known as Waxholmsbolaget, who gave her the name Saxaren and run her on the route between Stockholm and Marum via Linanäs.

In May 1964, the Saxaren capsized and sank at Stor-Krån's dock in western Saxarfjärden and was written off by her insurers as beyond economic repair. The sunken ship was sold to a pair of students and steamboat enthusiasts, Staffan Lindhé and Hans Johansson, for 1,200 kronor. The ship was subsequently salvaged and repaired, and, after an abortive sale to Danish interests, was sold to Strömma Kanalbolaget in 1973. In 1974, she regained her original name of Gustafsberg VII and, at the wedding of Princess Christina and Tord Magnuson, transported the royal couple and their wedding guests from Stockholm to Drottnigholm Palace.

In 1985, the Gustafsberg VII was converted to diesel power, and her original steam engines were transferred to the Oskarshamn Maritime Museum, where they are still on display. In 2013, she reprised her 1974 role, by carrying the guests of the wedding between Princess Madeleine and Christopher O'Neill from Stockholm to Drottningholm.

== Operation ==
The Gustafsberg VII is operated by Strömma Kanalbolaget on cruises through the Stockholm archipelago that operate from the Nybrokajen in Stockholm. Some of these cruises follow the ship's original route to Gustavsberg via the Skurusundet and Baggensstäket waterways.

The Gustafsberg VII has a length of 34.66 metres (113.7 ft), a beam of 7.11 metres (23.3 ft), a draft of 2.5 metres (8 ft 2 in) and a tonnage of 266 GRT. She has a top speed of 13.5 knots (25.0 km/h; 15.5 mph) and carries 260 passengers.
