= MV Gustaf III =

Strömma Kanalbolaget passenger ferry and historic ship in Sweden

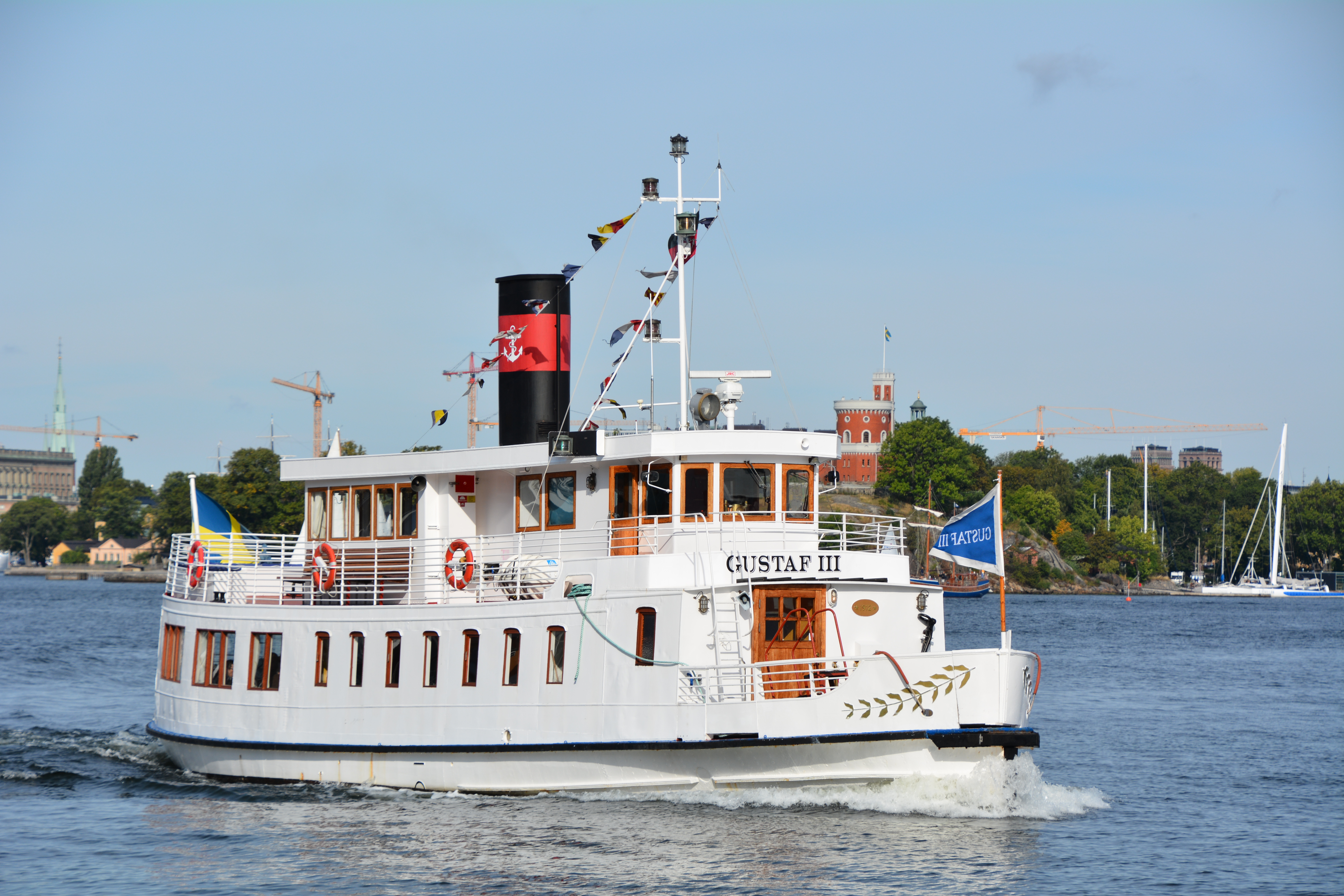

MV Gustaf III is a steamship that still operates in Sweden today as of 2021.

== History ==
Originally built as HMS Rindö in 1912, the Gustaf III was built by Bergsunds Mekaniska Verkstad in Stockholm and was launched in 1912 as HMS Rindö. She was delivered to the Coastal Artillery in Vaxholm, which used the ship for transports between Vaxön and Rindö until 1950.

In 1951, the central library on Lidingö with county librarian Elise Adelsköld applied for a grant for a new outreach cultural project with a book bus and book boat. In 1952, the application for the book boat was granted by the county council and Elise Adelsköld was hired by HMS Rindö from the coastal artillery. On May 5, 1953, the first trip for the book boat departed, which was the first book boat in Stockholm County.

In 1974, the Gustaf III was bought by Rederi AB Sommar & Sol, which renamed the ship the Gustaf III after renovation and rebuilding of the ship.

In 1995, Ångfartygs AB Strömma Kanal bought the vessel. She has her berth at Nybroviken in Stockholm.
