= Motala Verkstad =

Swedish engineering company

AB Motala Verkstad
- Type: Public
- Founded: 1822
- Headquarters: Motala, Sweden
- Revenue: SEK 400 million (2007)
- Number of employees: about 240 (2023)
- Website: mvg,se

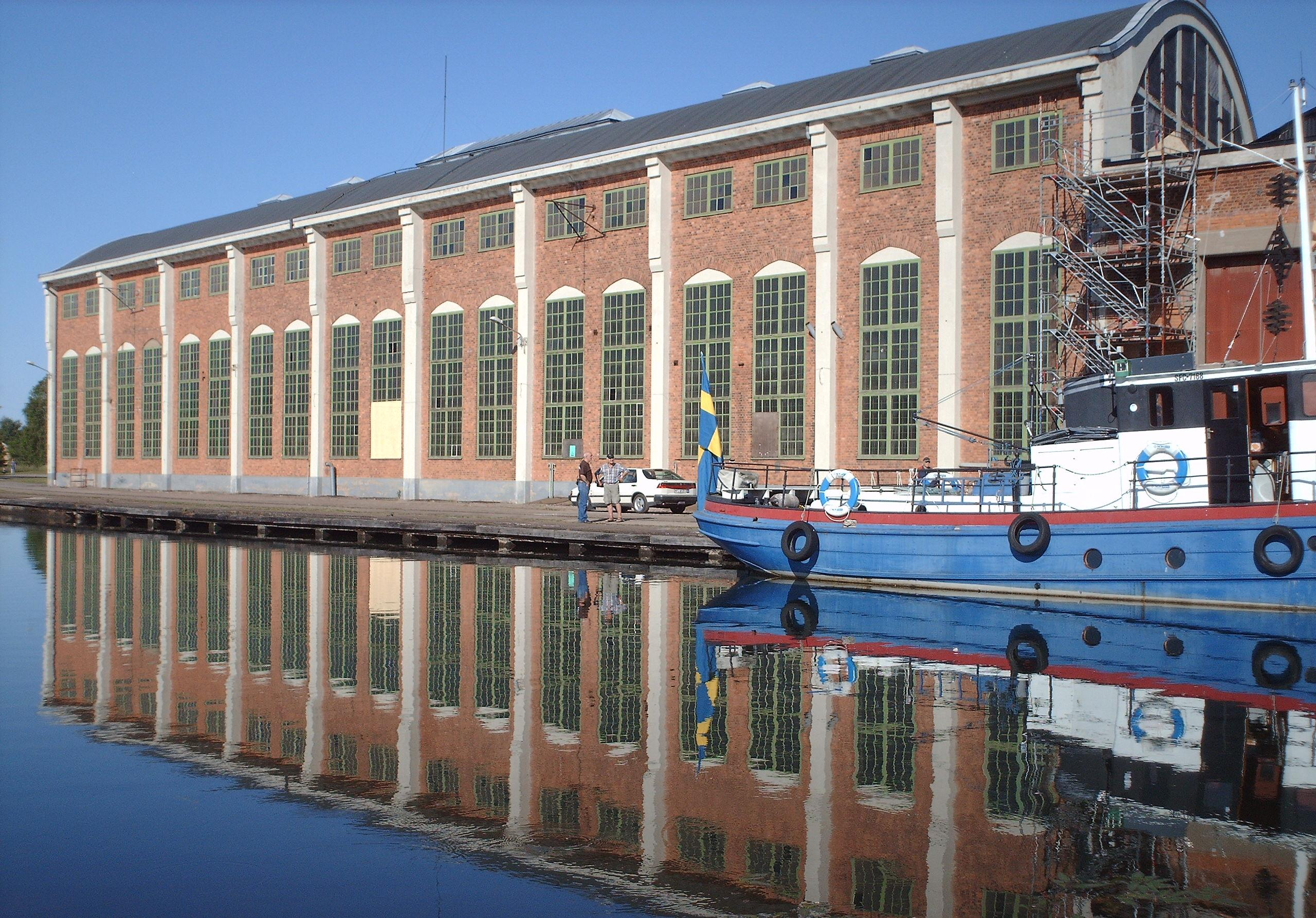
The old buildings by Göta Canal

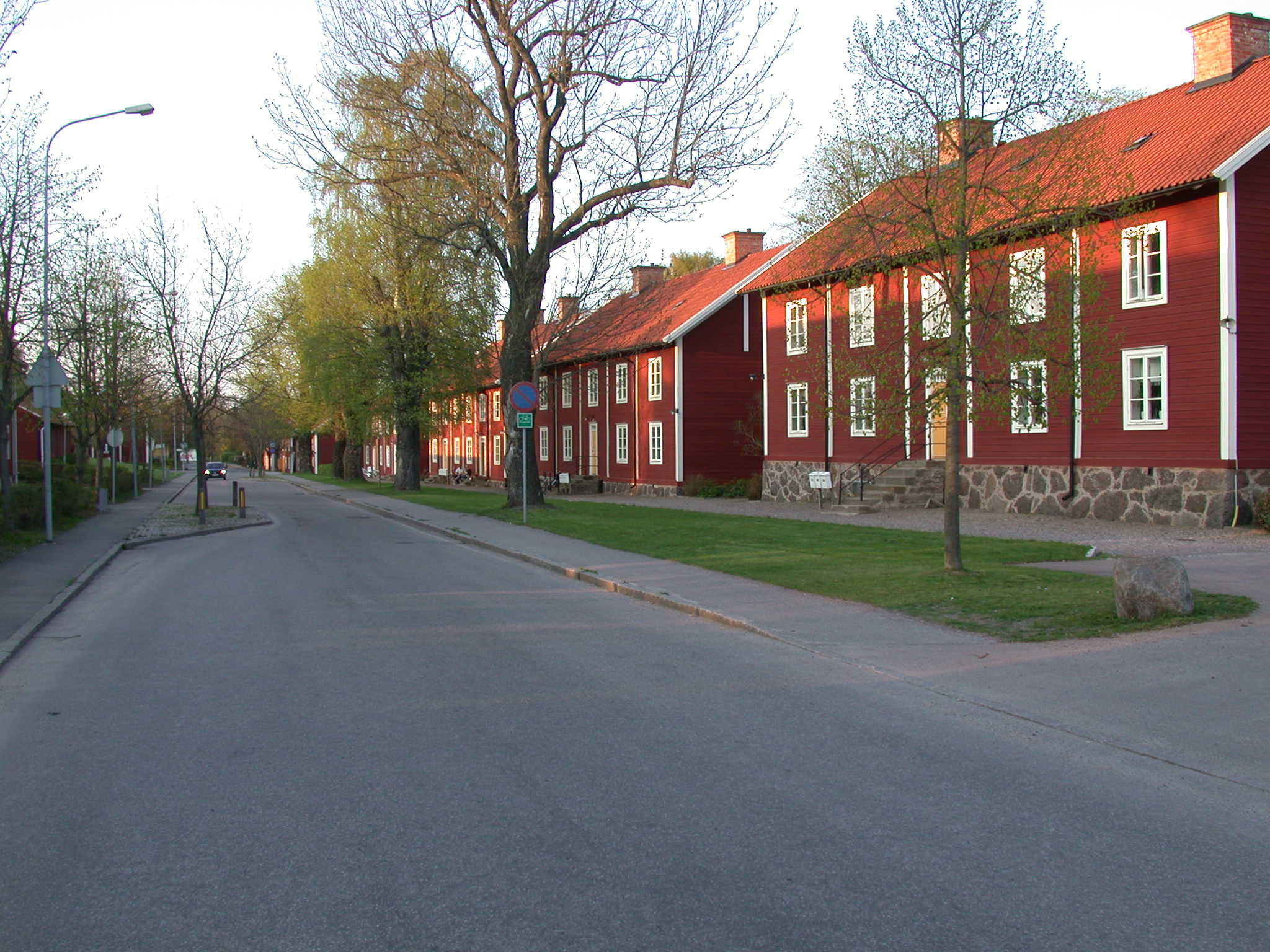
Worker's housing at Motala Verkstad

AB Motala Verkstad is one of the oldest engineering companies in Sweden. The company was founded in 1822 during the construction of Göta Canal. Motala Verkstad has also built about 400 ships, 800 bridges (e.g. Västerbron, Skeppsholmsbron, Bergsnäsbron and the Ahvaz Bridge in Iran), railway equipment, and 1300 locomotives. The 118-meter-tall towers of Uppsala Cathedral were also built by Motala Verkstad. During the 1970s the company was the world's largest exporter of kitchen sinks and during the 1980s they built landing gear for Swedish-built aircraft. As of 2023 the company employs about 240 people.

== History ==
Motala Verkstad was started in 1822 on Baltzar von Platen's initiative. Von Platen realized the importance of having local technical knowledge during the construction of the channel. The first leader was Daniel Fraser.

== Ships built at Motala Verkstad ==
- Hildur-class monitors (1870s)
- M/S Juno (1874)
- SS Nya Svartsjölandet (1900, now MV Västan)
- SS Angantyr (1909)
- SS Valkyrian (1909, now SS Drottningholm)
- PS Skibladner (1856)

== In literature ==
In Jules Verne's 1870 novel Twenty Thousand Leagues Under the Seas, the "beak" of the submarine Nautilus was built at Motala Verkstad.
