= Strömma Kanalbolaget =

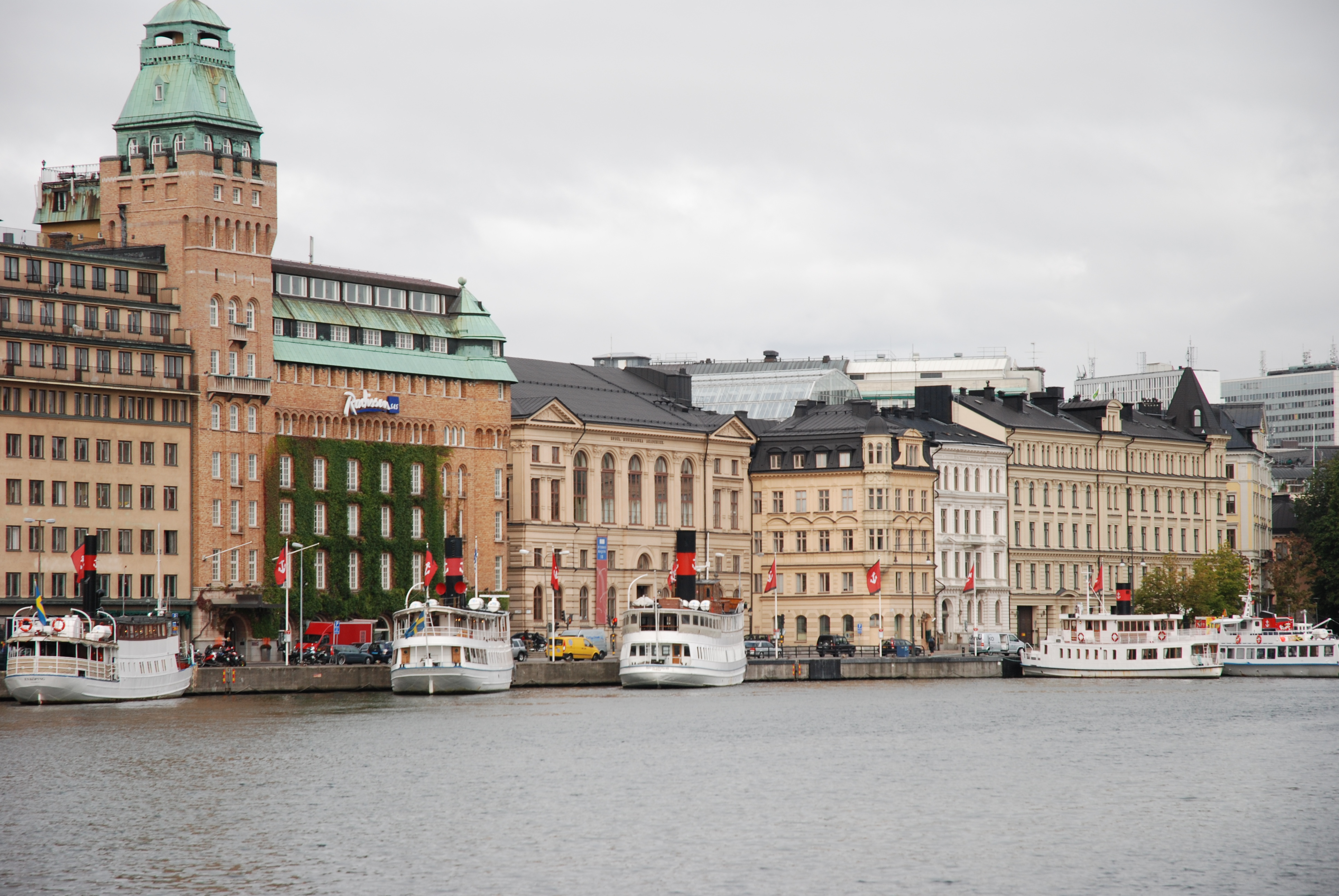
- Five ships of the Strömma Kanalbolaget at their Nybroviken berths
- Industry: Maritime transport
- Headquarters: Stockholm, Sweden
- Area served: Stockholm city Stockholm archipelago Lake Malaren
- Services: Tourism
- Owner: Strömma Turism & Sjöfart

Ångfartygs AB Strömma Kanal, better known as the Strömma Kanalbolaget, is an operator of tourist shipping services in and around Stockholm, Sweden, as well as a number of ferry routes under the name Cinderellabåtarna in the same area. It is part of the Strömma Turism & Sjöfart group, which operates tourist services in a number of cities around Europe, including the City Sightseeing tourist bus franchise for Stockholm.

== History ==
Ångfartygs AB Strömma Kanal was started in 1968 with the aim of saving historic ships from being scrapped. It took its name from a 19th-century shipping company that operated services from Stockholm to Sandhamn, via the Strömma Canal. In 1992, the company was taken over by August Lindholm Eftr. AB, a company that operated sightseeing boats within Stockholm, and all the latter company's boats and services were transferred to the Strömma Kanalbolaget. At the same time, the owning company changed its name to Strömma Turism & Sjöfart. In 1993, the company also acquired the vessels and services of City Jet Line AB, who operated fast ferries to the outer archipelago under the brand Cinderella.

== Current fleet ==
Strömma Kanalbolaget's fleet includes a number of notable and historic vessels, including:

- Enköping (1868)
- Djurgården 7 (1893)
- Prince Carl Philip (1901)
- Waxholm III (1903)
- Östanå I (1906)
- Angantyr (1909)
- Drottningholm (1909)
- Gustafsberg VII (1912)
- Gustaf III (1912)
- Stockholm (1931)
- Stegeholm (1950)
- Strömma Kanal (1975)
- Evert Taube (1976)
- Mälar Victoria (1984)
- Cinderella II (1986)
- Cinderella I (1990)
