= Sandhamn =

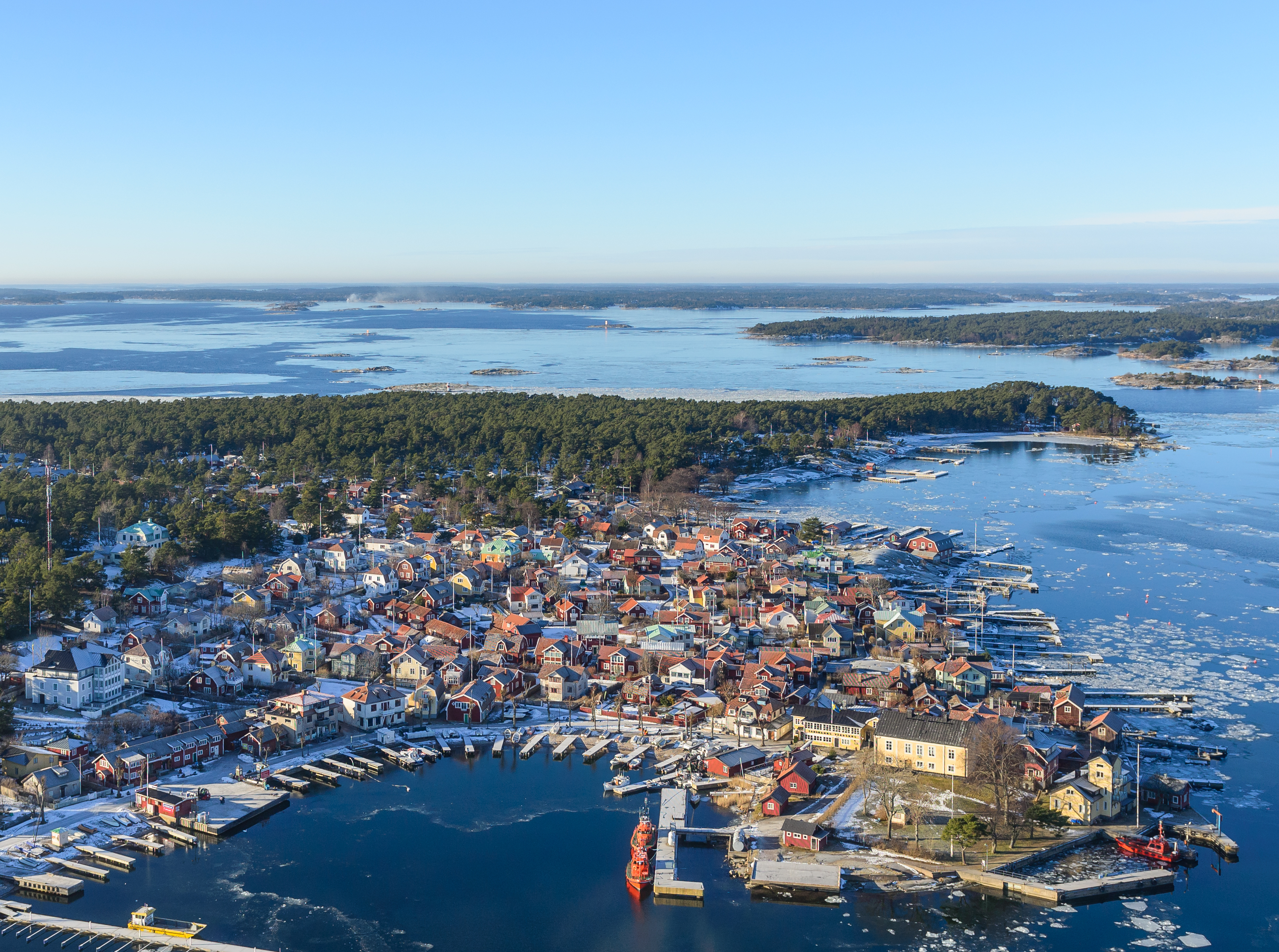
- Sandhamn, Stockholm Archipelago

- Location within Sweden
- Coordinates: 59°17′20.55″N 18°54′54.40″E
- Country: Sweden
- Municipality: Värmdö Municipality
- County: Stockholm County
- Province: Uppland
- Founded: Before 1280

Area
  - Total: 0.27 km^{2} (0.10 sq mi)

Population (2005-12-31)
  - Total: 108
  - Density: 407/km^{2} (1,050/sq mi)
- Time zone: UTC+1 (CET)
  - Summer (DST): UTC+2 (CEST)
- Website: www.sandhamn.se

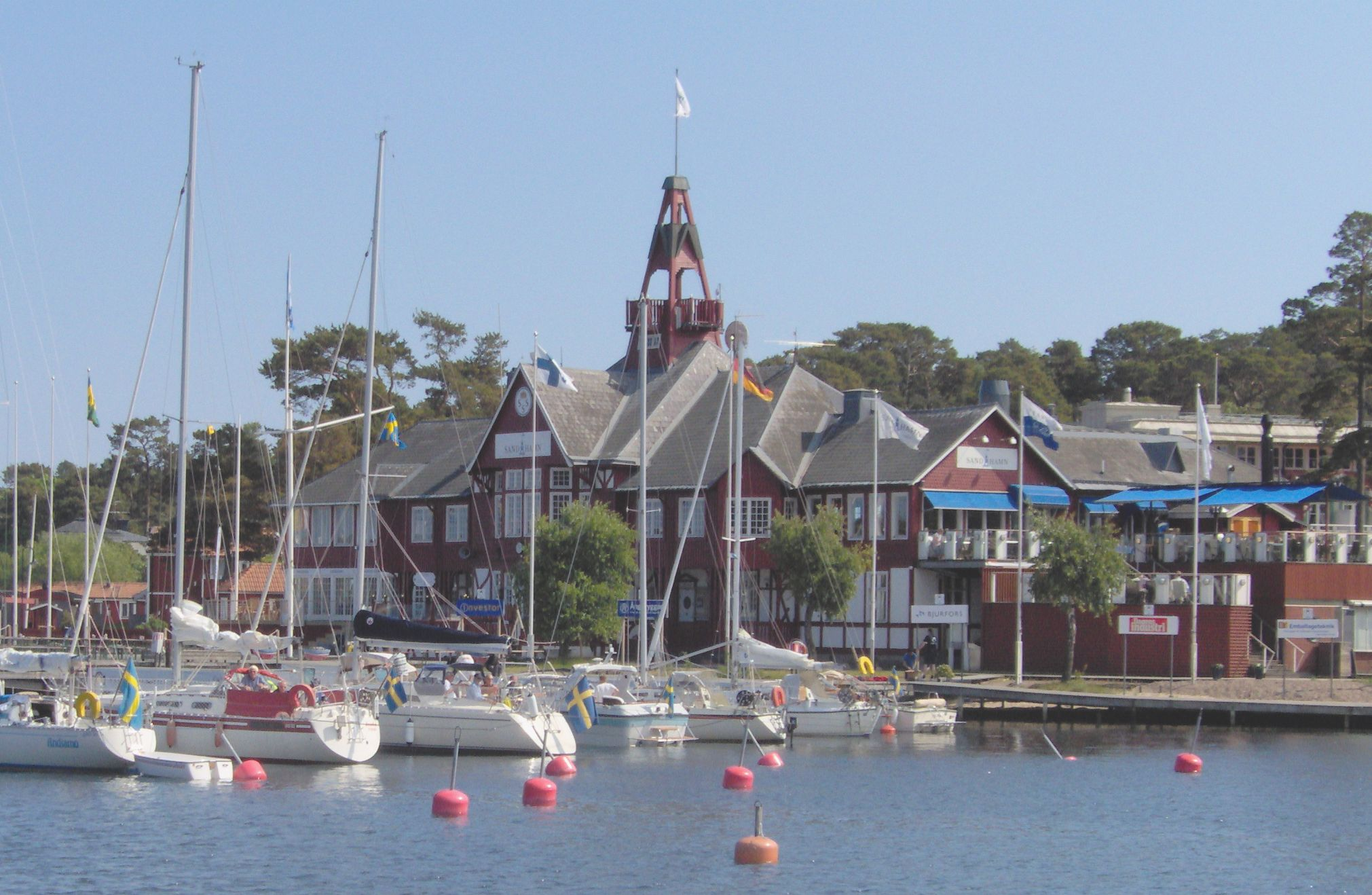
Seglarhotellet - "The Sandhamn Sailing Hotel"

Sandhamn (Swedish for "Sand Harbour") is a small settlement in the central-peripheral part of the Stockholm Archipelago at the 59th parallel north in central-eastern Sweden. approximately 50 km (30 mi) east of Stockholm. Sandhamn is located on the island Sandön ("Sand Island"), which is, however, colloquially referred to as Sandhamn. Administratively, it is in Värmdö Municipality and Stockholm County.

One of the most important natural ports in the archipelago with easy access to the Swedish capital, Sandhamn has been popular for pleasure boating since the late 19th century. While the settlement only has a hundred permanent inhabitants, the number of residents increases to 2-3,000 during the summer. Sandhamn receives an additional 100,000 visitors annually. Two of the major employers on the island, other than the restaurants and bed & breakfasts, are the Swedish Maritime Administration (Sjöfartsverket) and the local police force.

The harbour can receive 350 ships, while up to 150 boats can be moored on the neighboring island Lökholmen. Sandhamn is connected to the mainland by ferry lines departing from Stavsnäs and Stockholm, operated by Waxholmsbolaget and Cinderellabåtarna. Cinderellabåtarna's parent company, Strömma Kanalbolaget, also operates tourist cruises that call at the island. Sandhamn is the scene for the sailing Round Gotland Race covering two days, the most prestigious race in the Baltic Sea.

== History ==
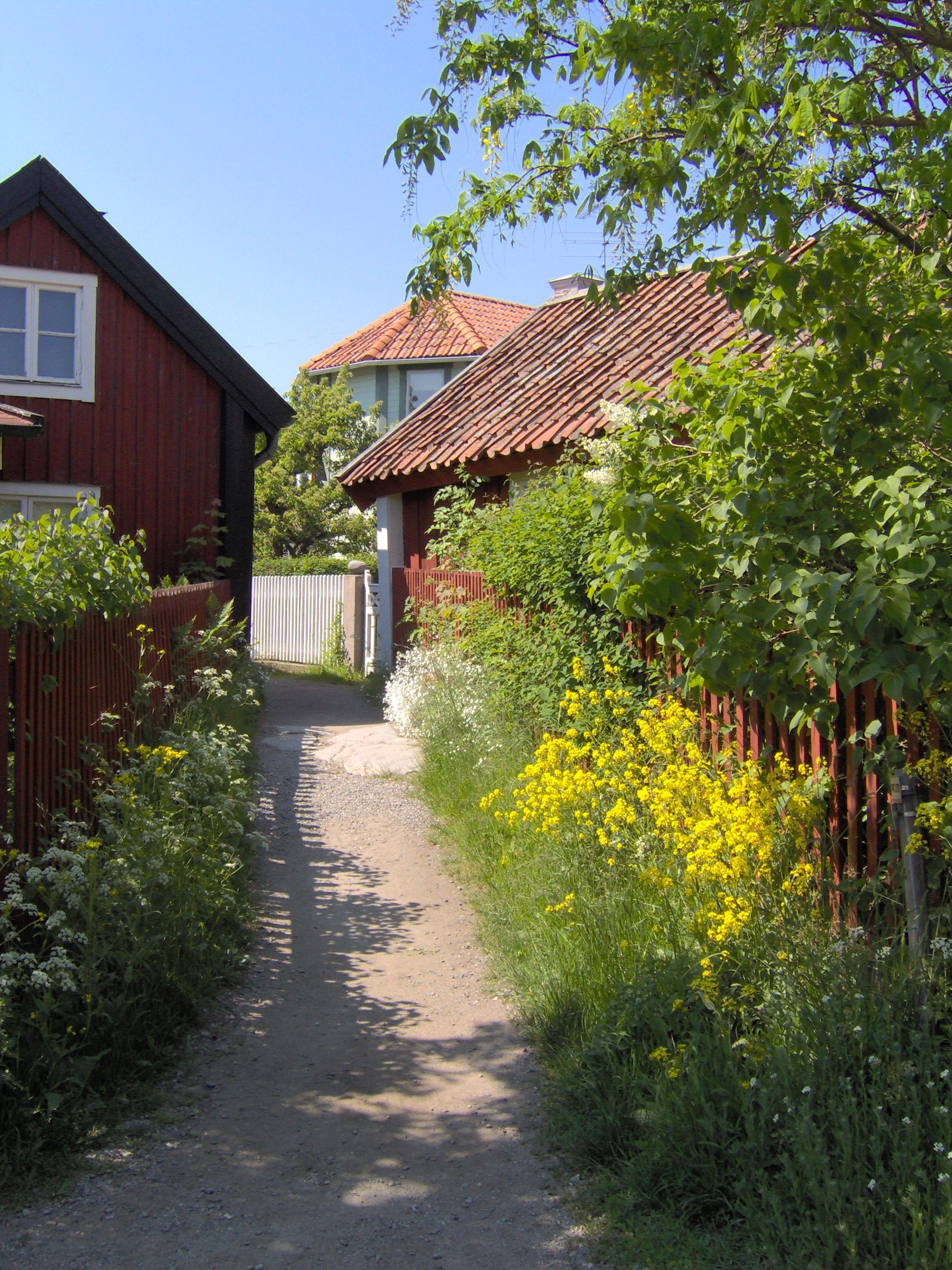
One of the characteristic gravel alleys.

The island of Sandön is first mentioned in historical records in the 1280s when King Magnus Barnlock donated it to the abbey of St Claire in Stockholm together with the islands Runmarö, Skarpprunmarn, Vindalsö, and Eknö. The island is possibly described in a travel account by Valdemar Sejr in the mid-13th century. Until the 16th century, Sandhamn is mentioned as Svenska Sandön ("Swedish Sand Island") and is said to belong to the Eknö by village. At that time, the island was most likely uninhabited and mostly used for pasturage by inhabitants on the surrounding islands. No later than the 17th century, the inhabitants of Eknö had maritime piloting as a by-income, but, as the navigable strait passing by Sandhamn was restricted to the Swedish Navy and ships going to Estonia and Latvia, a single pilot was settled on the island by the end of that century.

During the reign of Charles XI (1660–1697) the passage outside Sandhamn was opened to commercial shipping which increased the need for piloting in the strait. In the 18th century, three cottages on the island were used by the pilots. By the mid-19th century piloting had become the main source of income for the islanders and Eknö by was finally abandoned for Sandhamn. While serving as a customs inspector 1852-1869, the poet Elias Sehlstedt (1808–1874) described the life of the people of Sandhamn.

During the second half of the 19th century, approximately 300 people had settled in Sandhamn, which made it one of the largest settlements in the Stockholm Archipelago. A regular steamship connection with Stockholm, passing by Stavsnäs, was established in 1865. It quickly transformed Sandhamn to a popular spot for summer vacations for the wealthy class — islanders gradually rebuilding their cottages to accommodate the increasing numbers of summer guests. The Royal Swedish Yacht Club started to organise regattas in the 1890s and Sandhamn, with its proximity to both the Swedish capital and to navigable waters, became a natural choice. The organisation had a clubhouse built in 1897 to the design of Fredrik Lilljekvist and Sandhamn has remained one of the main hubs for pleasure sailing in Sweden ever since.

Sandön, together with the neighbouring islands Lökholmen and Korsö, with its mixture of historical piloting structures and post-World War II summer cottages, is a historical milieux unique to the Stockholm Archipelago. It includes the Korsö lighthouse (Korsö torn) designed by architect Carl Hårleman and inaugurated in 1757 as the first lighthouse featuring a moving light beam. In 1914, the coal and oil dealer Kurt Heinicke had several odd structures built on Lökholmen, including a Sami hut, a curiosity museum, an observatory, and two private residences for himself. Today one of his residences and the observatory survives.

== Notable structures ==
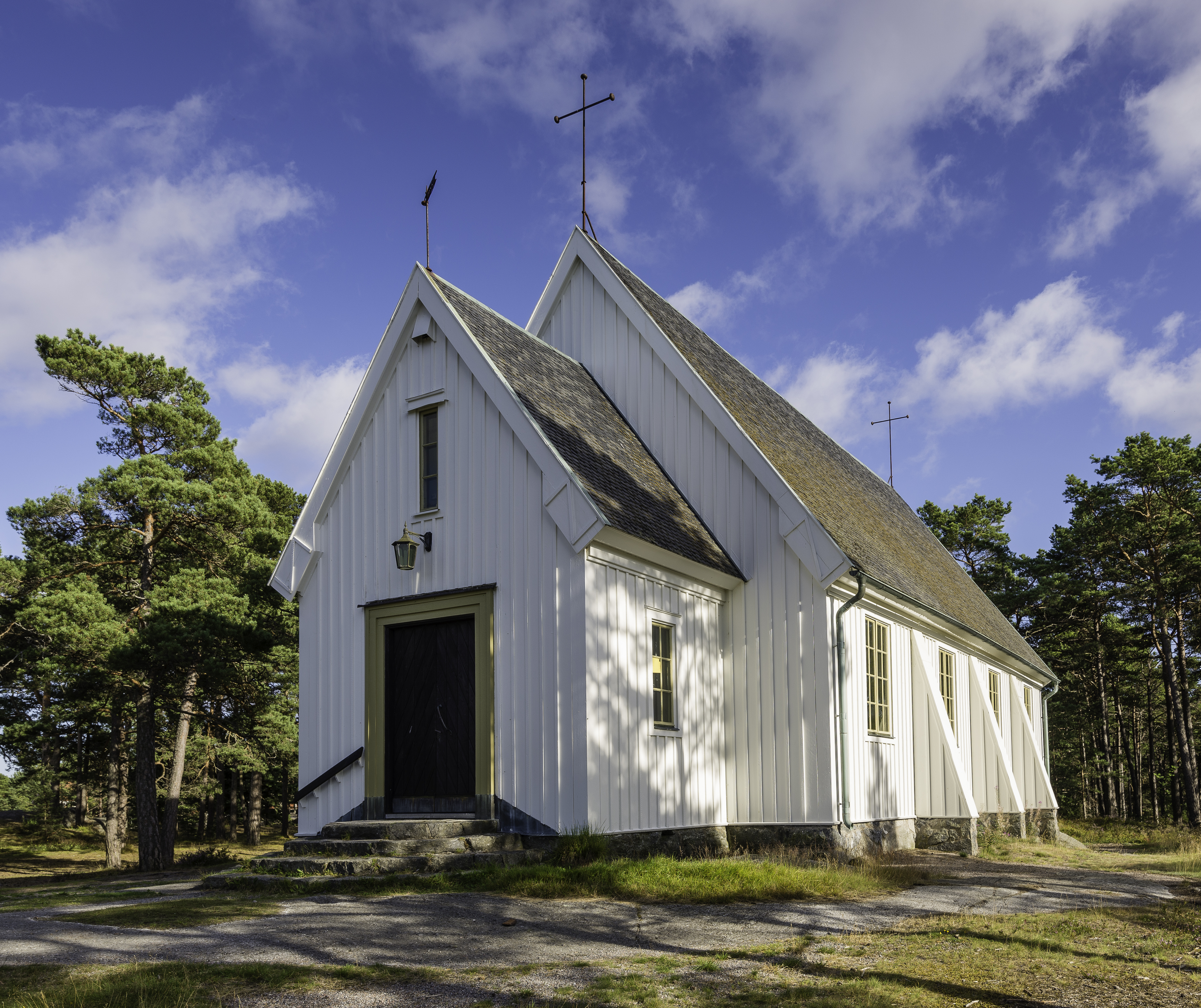
Sandhamn chapel in Sandhamn, Stockholm archipelago. Built 1934–1935. Djurö, Möja och Nämdö parish, Church of Sweden.

- The tower used by the pilots was built in 1962. Next to it is the simple chapel characteristic for the archipelago and inaugurated in 1935.
- The central area of the town is a mixture of traditional log houses and summer villas from the start of the 20th century. Later additions have been adapted to the historical context on the island.
- The buildings in the harbour area itself are of more recent date, including shops, bakeries, cafés, hostels, and taverns.
- South of the settlement is the sandpit which gave the island its name. The sand was sold as ballast for sailing ships well into the 20th century, and as construction material during the first half of that century.
- The Customs House, built in 1752, is one of the most characteristic buildings on the island. It has a room devoted to the memory of Elias Sehlstedt. The Sandhamn Museum is housed in the former residence of the customs officer (tullvaktsstugan).
- In the western part of the town is the cottage of artist Axel Sjöberg (Sjöbergsgården).
- The large anchors in the harbour have served to moor ships since the 18th century.
- The Strindberg garden

== In popular culture ==
Mikael Blomkvist, a central character in the Millennium Trilogy by Stieg Larsson, has a cabin in Sandhamn. Blomkvist uses the cabin as a place to relax and write.

Crime novels by Viveca Sten are set for the most part on Sandhamn. The crime drama series The Sandhamn Murders, based on the Sten novels, is shot on location.

== See also ==
- Geography of Stockholm
- List of islands of Sweden
- Stockholm Archipelago Trail

== See also ==
- Stockholm Archipelago Trail
