= Oskarshamn Shipyard =

Shipbuilding and repair facility in Sweden

Coordinates: 57°15′42.57″N 16°28′05.90″E

Oskarshamn Shipyard is a shipbuilding and repair facility located in Oskarshamn, Sweden.

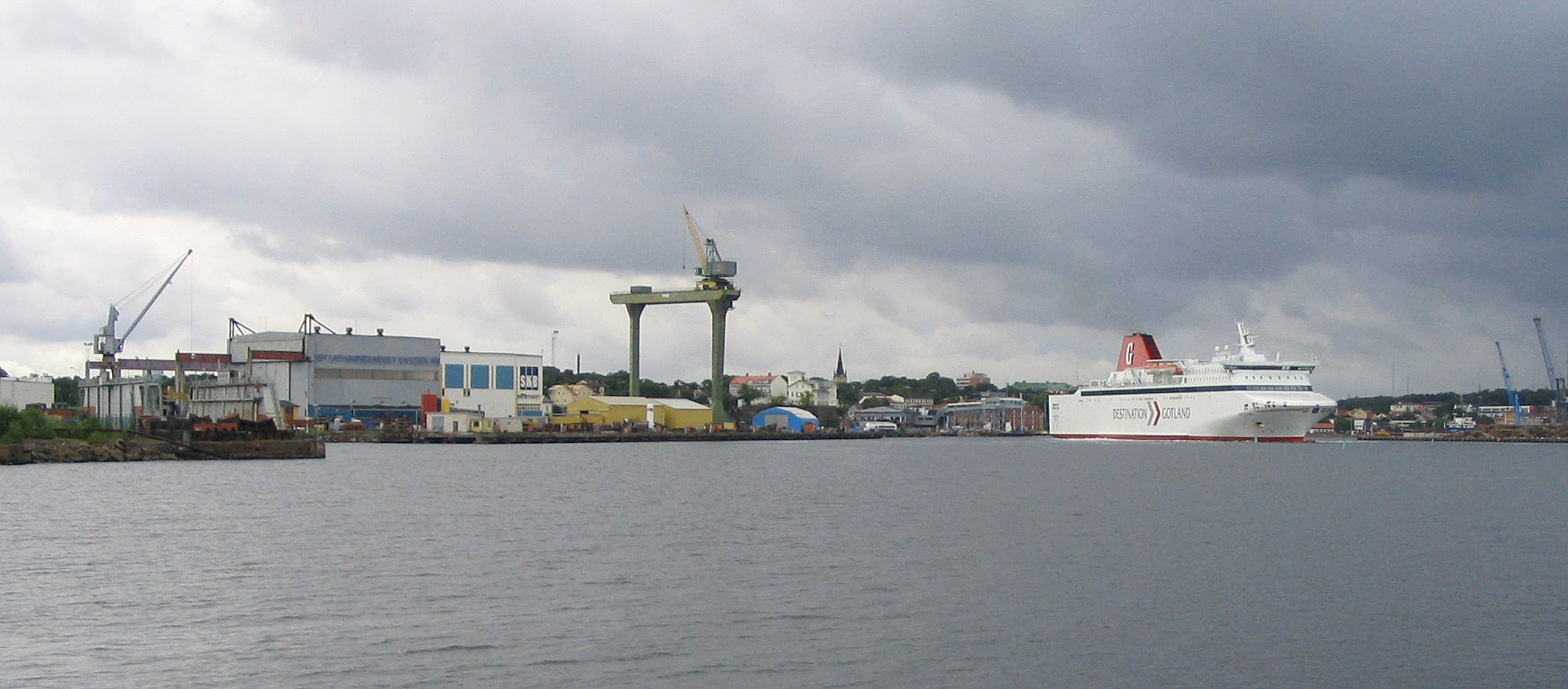
Port of Oskarshamn with Oskarshamn Shipyard to the left.

== General information ==
The shipyard company was established in 1863, when a dry dock was built in Oskarshamn. About 540 vessels have been built and launched at the shipyard since then. In the 1960s, the company had a working force of about 1,450 people.

The Oskarshamn shipyard is still active. Some of the facilities are floating drydock, gantry crane, slipway, and 318 metres of quay.

== Ships built at the shipyard ==
Below is a gallery of some of the ships built at Oskarshamn Shipyard:

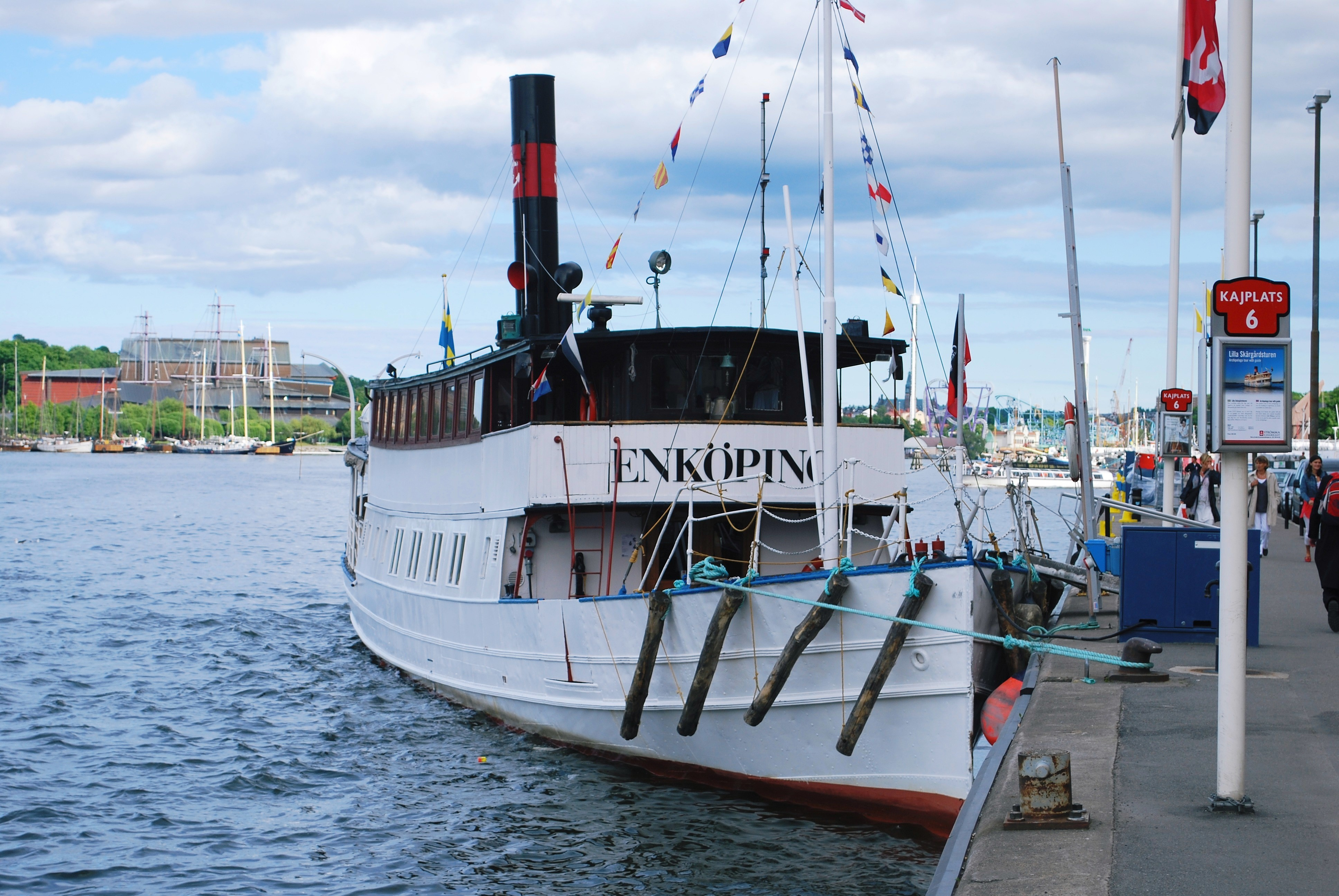
SS Enköping, steamship launched 1868

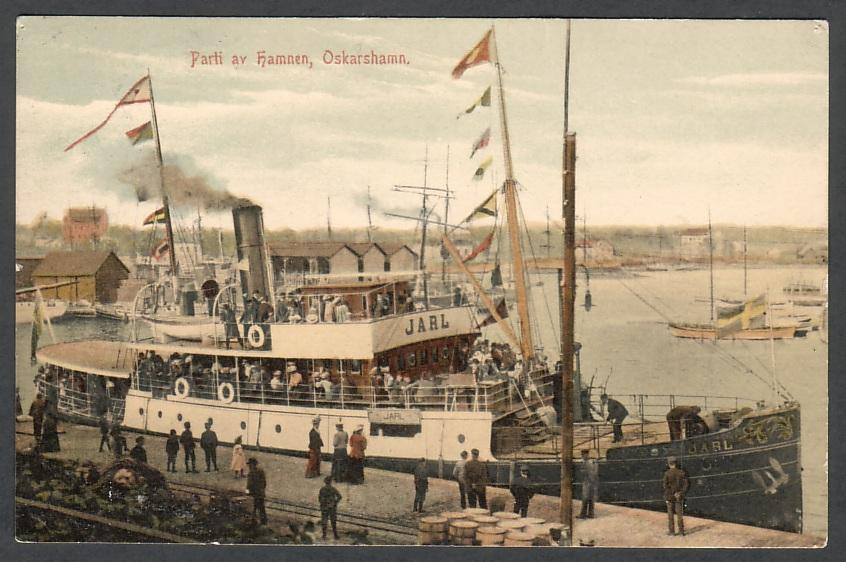
SS Jarl, steamship launched 1907

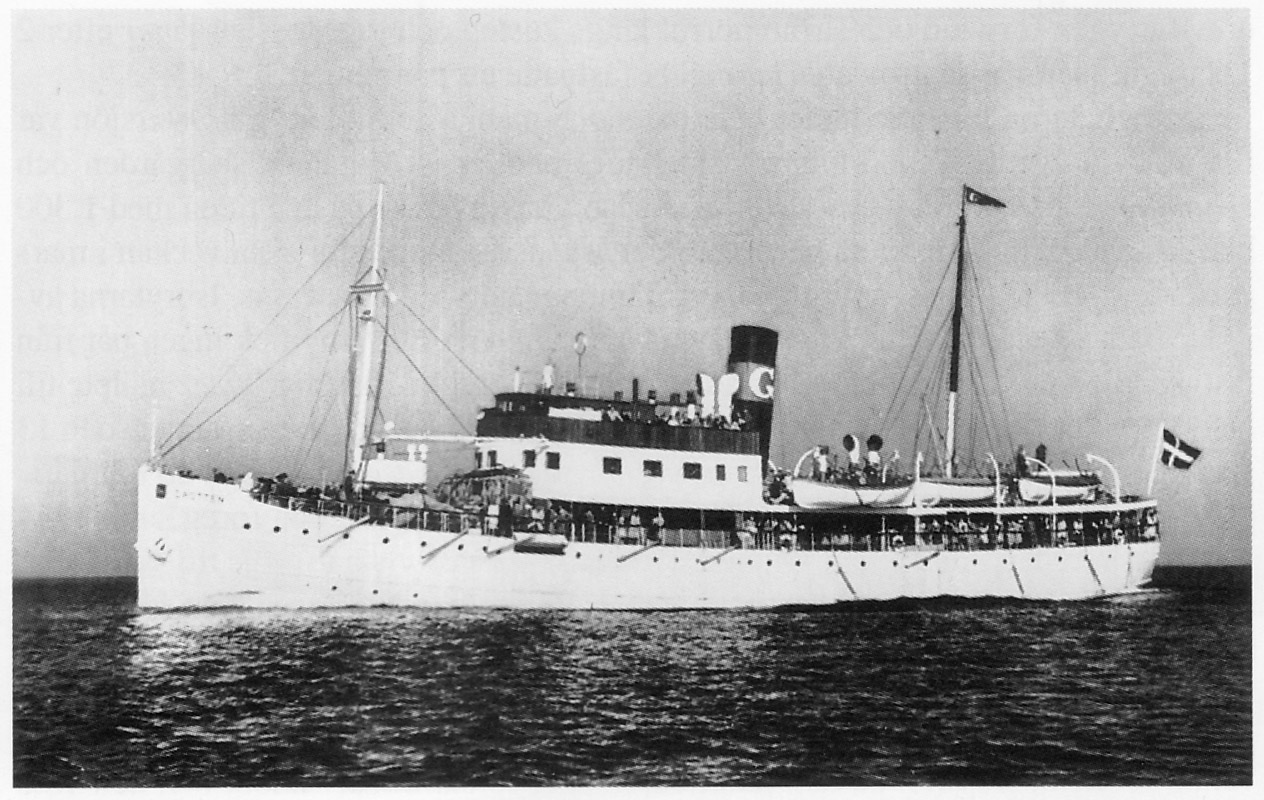
SS Drotten, steamship launched 1927

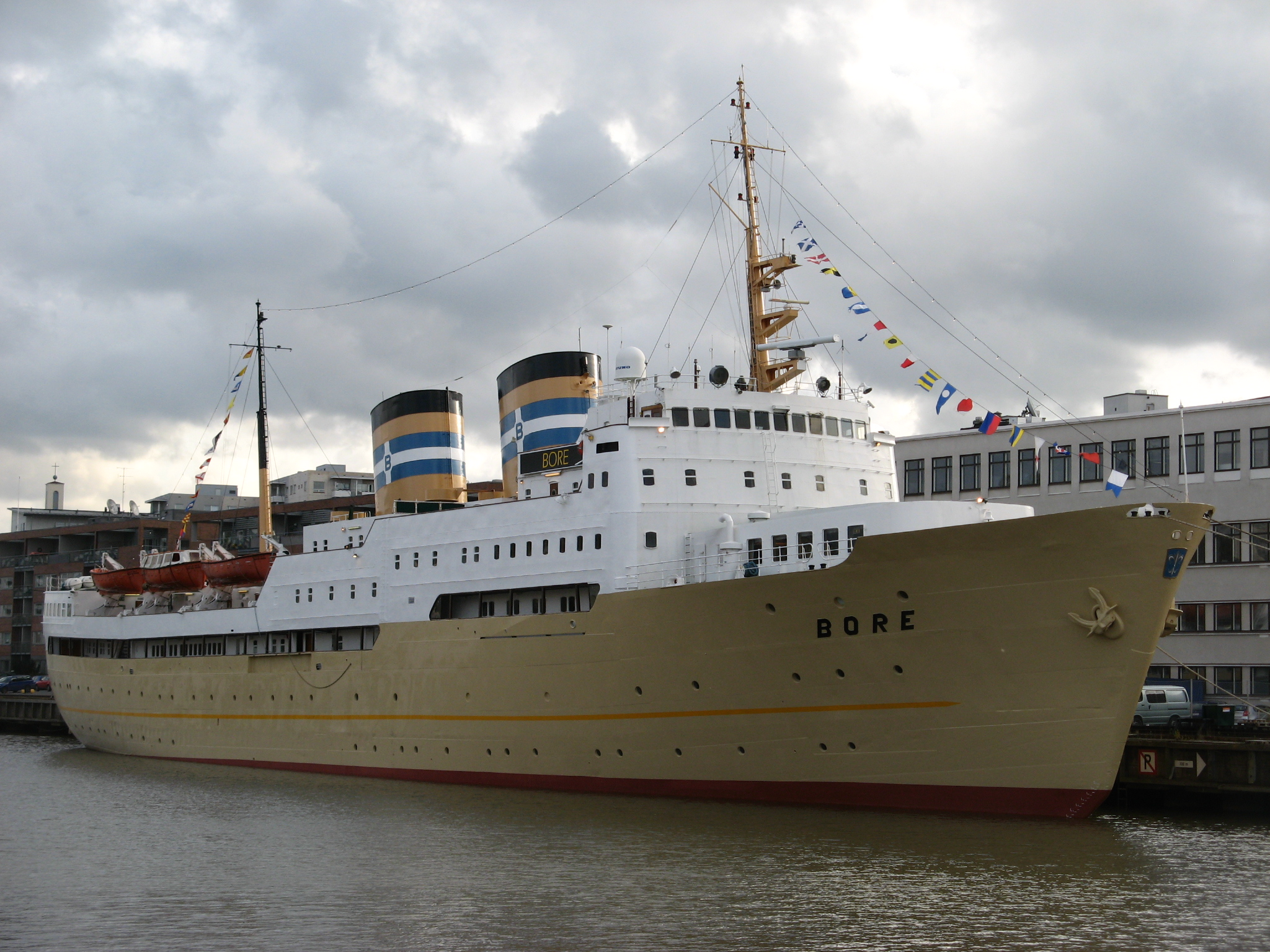
MS Bore, passenger ferry launched in 1960

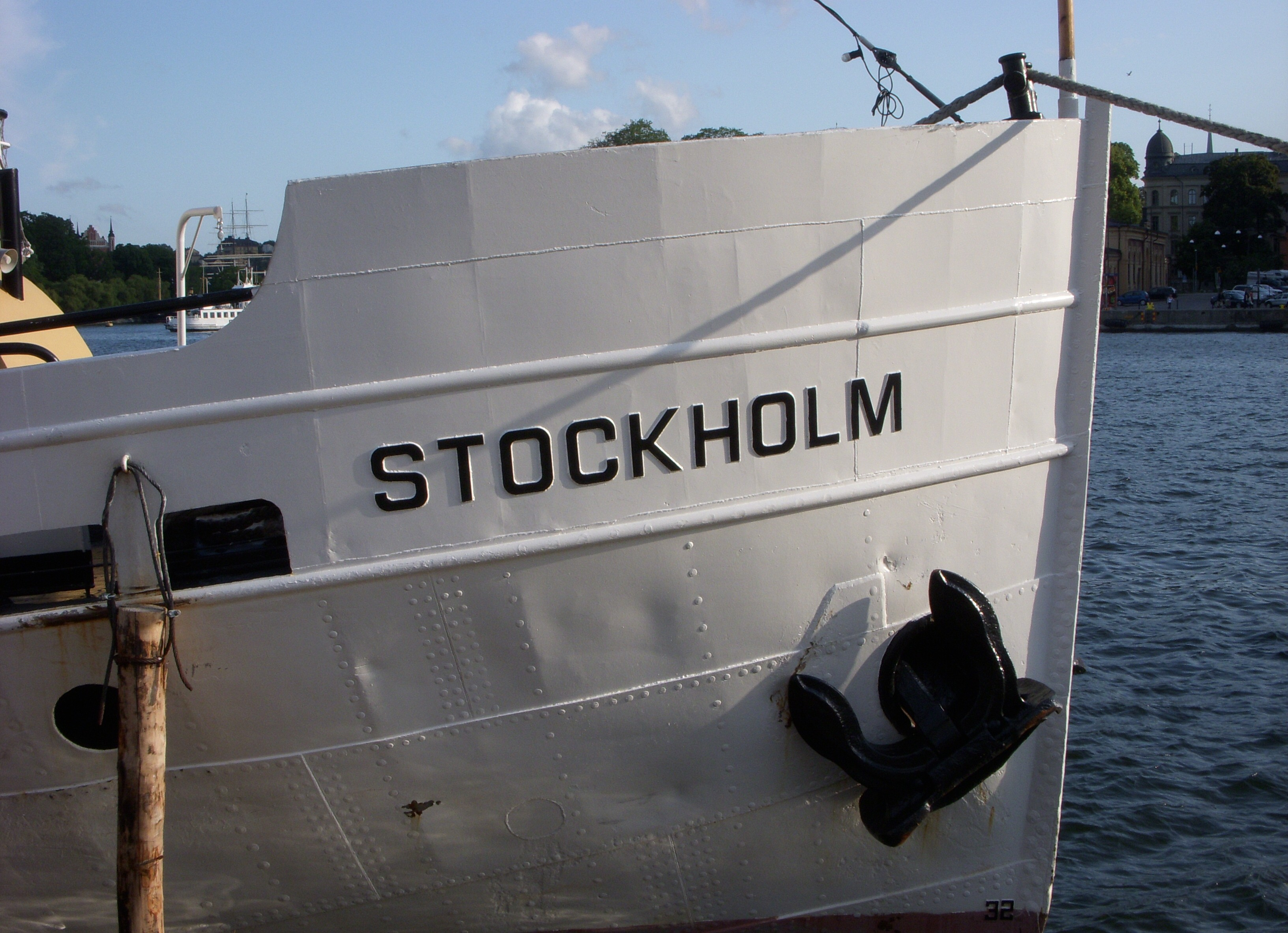
SS Stockholm, passenger ferry built in 1931.

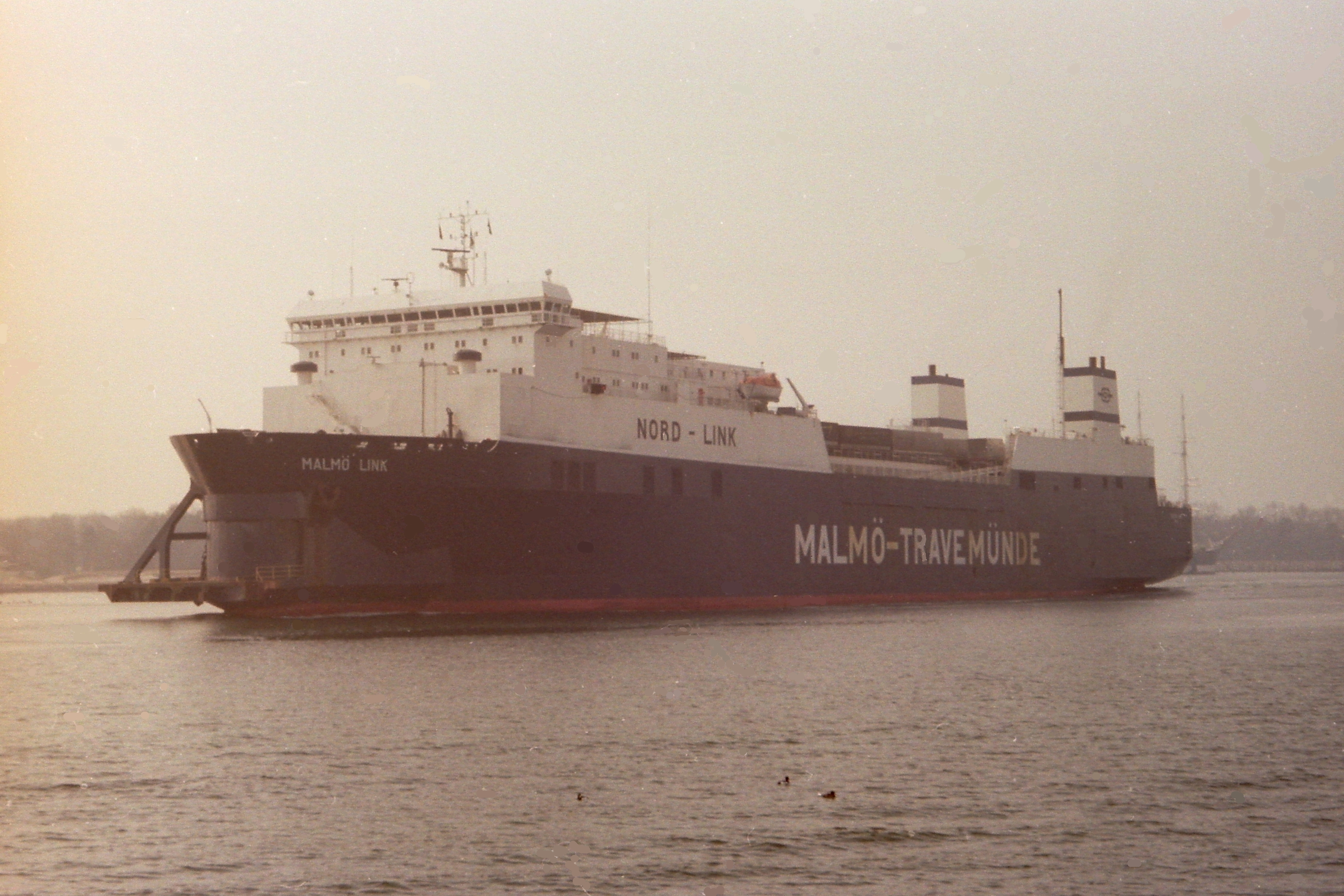
MS Malmö Link leaves Travemünde in 1993

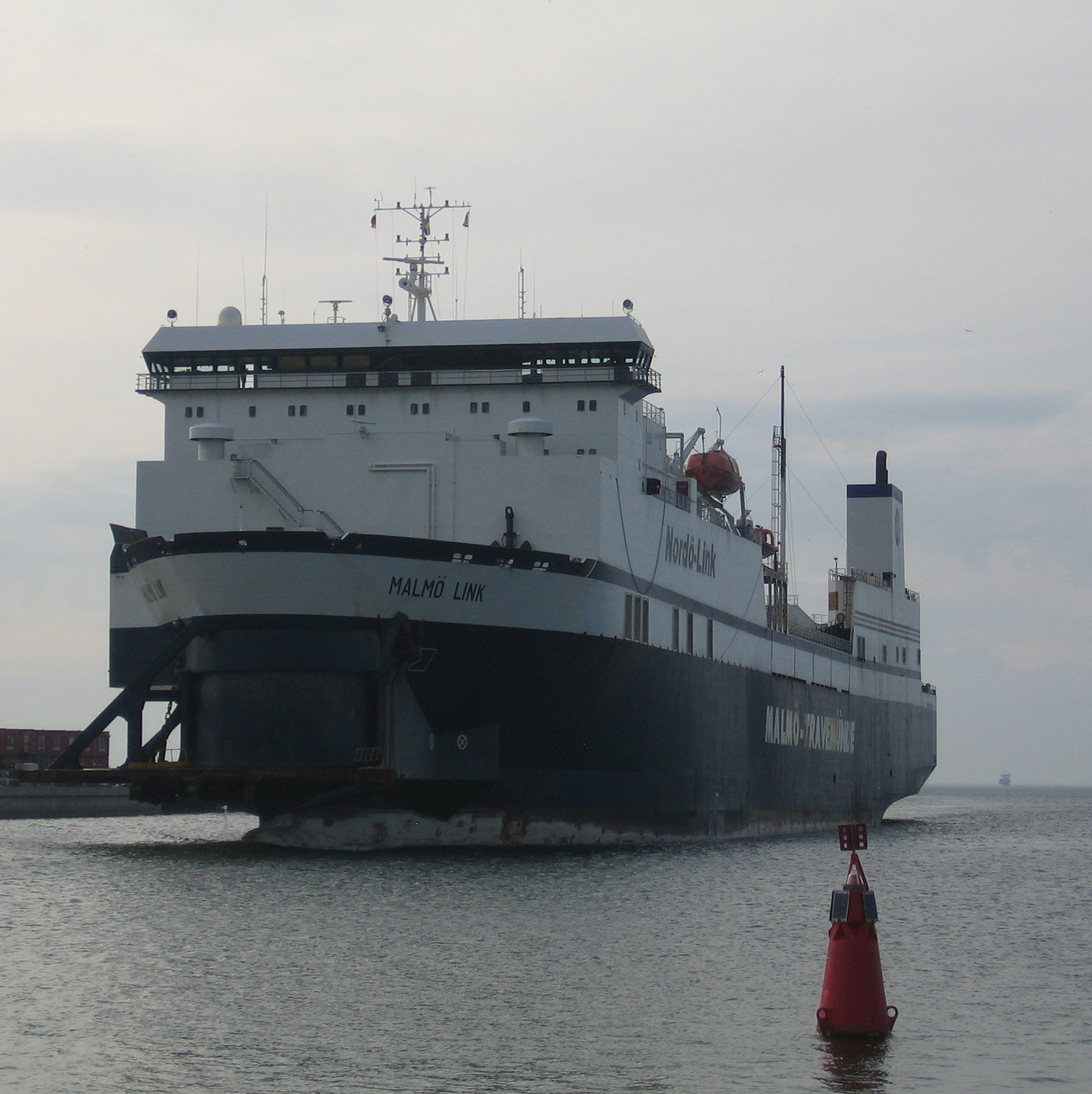
MS Malmö Link, Ropax-ship built in 1980

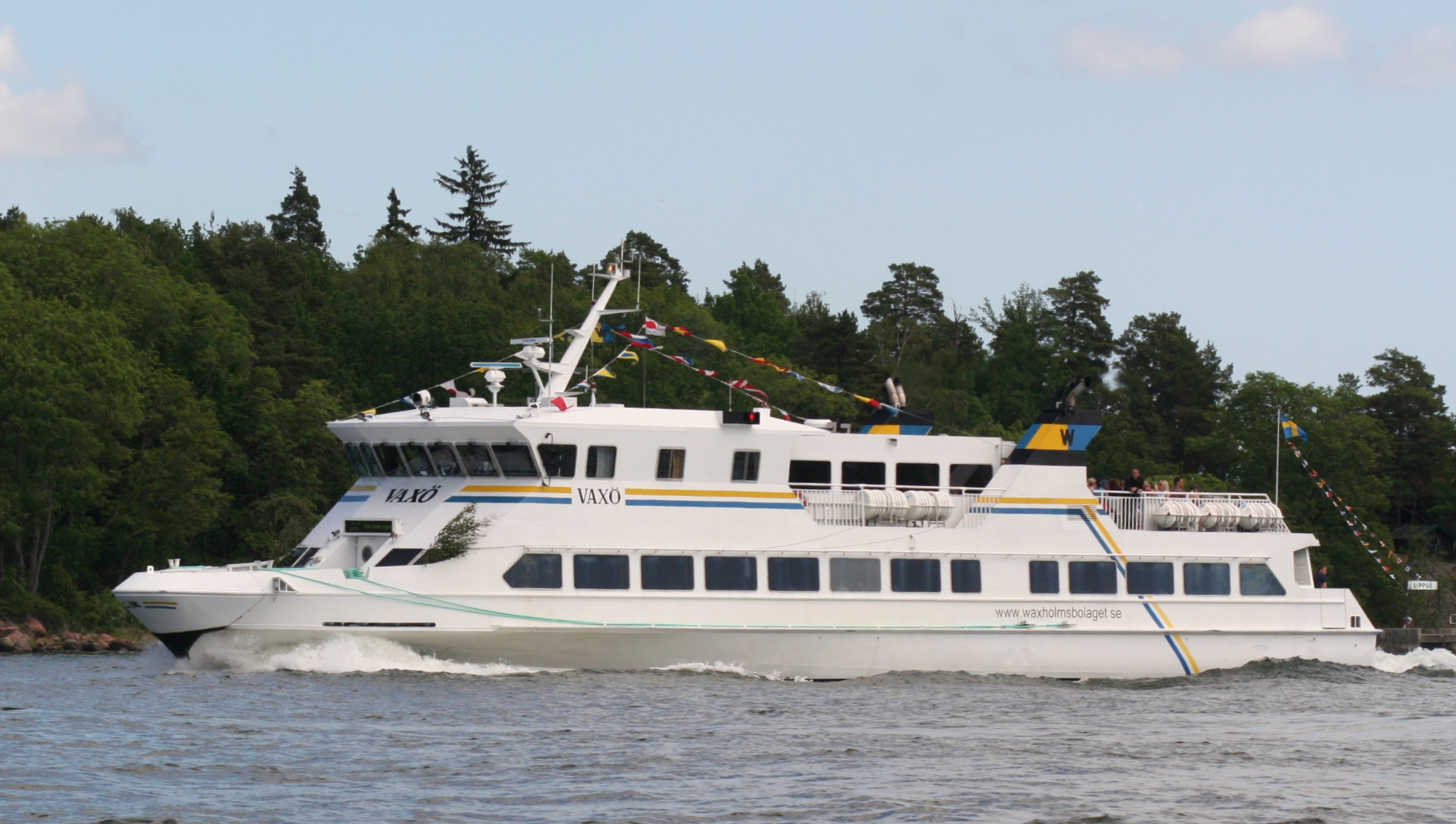
MV Vaxö, passenger ferry launched 1993
