= Listing of historic ships in Sweden =

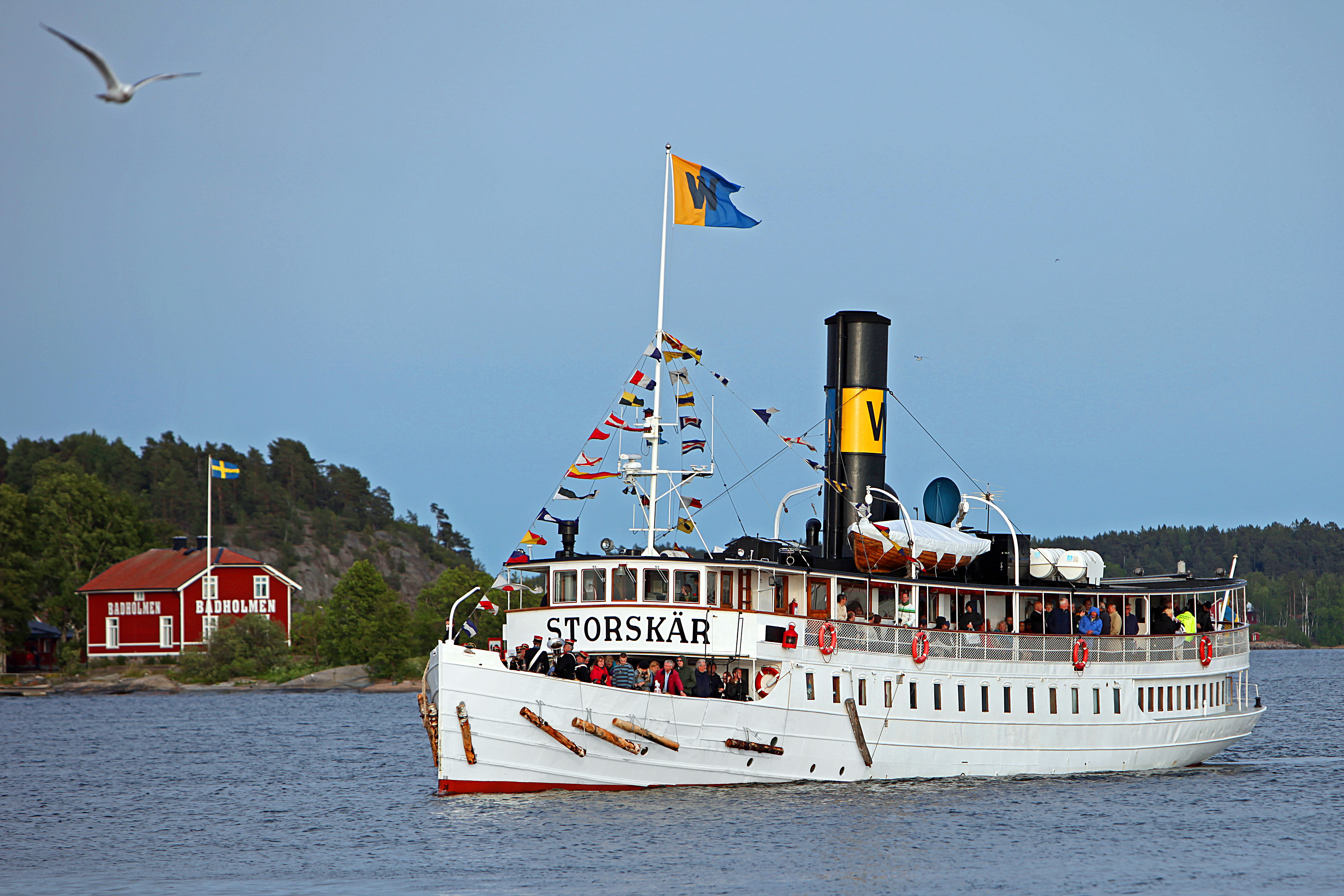
The steamship SS Storskär (built 1908) is a listed Swedish ship.

The Maritime Museum in Stockholm is responsible for the listing of historic ships in Sweden (Swedish: kulturmärkning av fartyg i Sverige). The purpose of the listing is to encourage and support owners of historic ships and boats to preserve and take care of their vessels. The listing does not confer any legal protection on the vessels or obligations on their owners but entitles them to some privileges.

== Ships and pleasure boats ==
Historic ships and boats can be listed in either of two categories: Listed historical ships or Listed historical pleasure boats. (Note: The Maritime Museum uses the terms Listed historical ships and Listed historical pleasure boats, even though the correct word in English would arguably be "historic".) The purpose of listing vessels is similar in both cases; it is done in order to "make them better recognized, preserved and used". In addition, the listing aims to encourage conscious private cultural heritage ownership and management. Owners of listed ships are entitled to display a plaque that confirms the ship's listed status on board, and pleasure boats are equipped with a similar enamel sign.

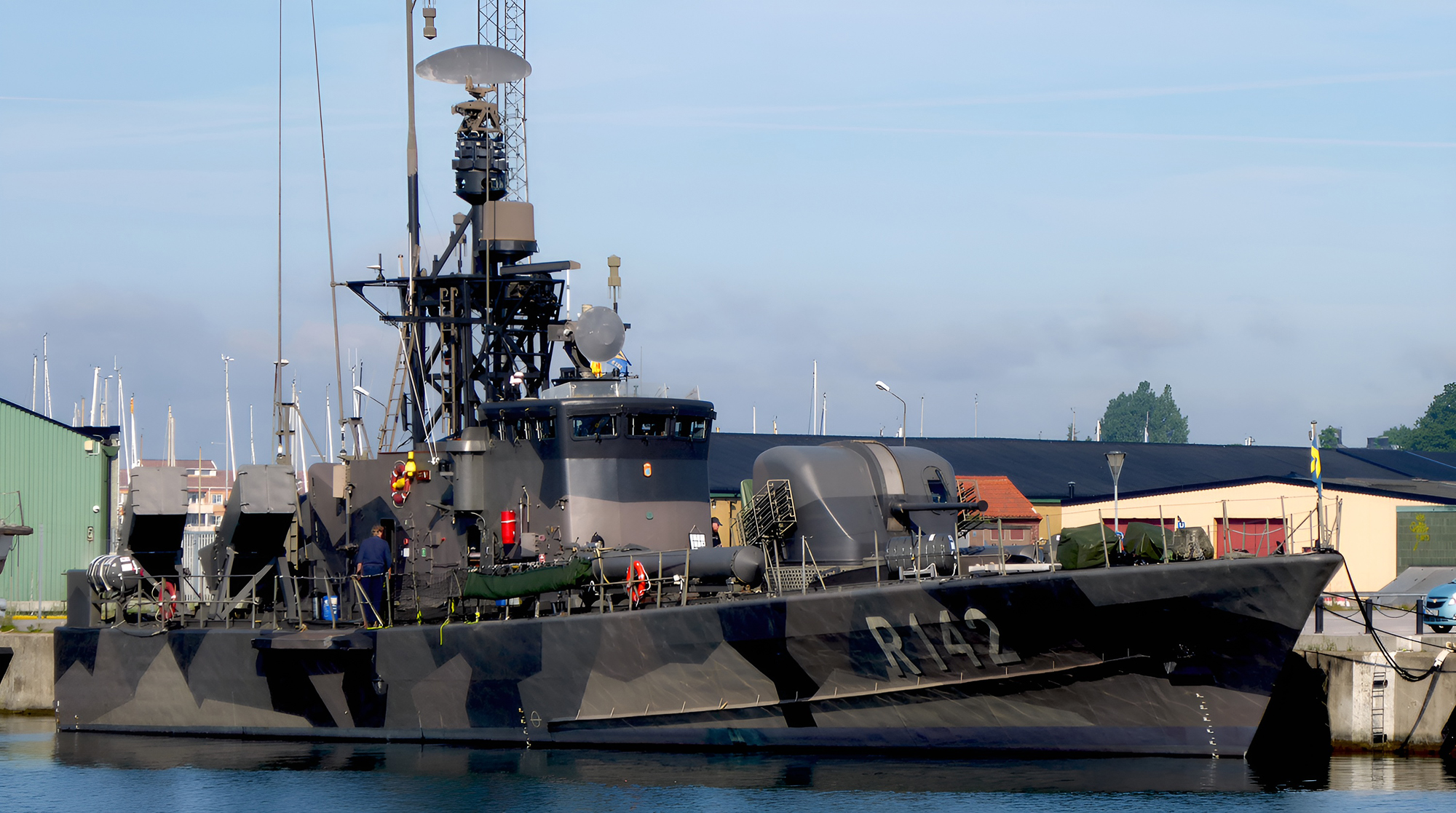
HMS Ystad (T142/R142), a Norrköping-class missile boat, is an example of a former naval vessel which is today a listed ship.

While the listing does not confer any legal protection on the ships – in contrast to listed buildings – the Maritime Museum notes that listed ships and boats under some circumstances enjoy reduced harbour fees and listed pleasure boats sometimes enjoy various benefits by harbours, canals, dockyards and boat clubs. For example, a news item from 2013 notes that at Galärvarvet on Djurgården in central Stockholm, listed boats and ships may berth for a short period of time free of charge if they agree to let visitors come aboard. Listed pleasure boats are also e.g. exempted from a national ban on letting out toilet waste into the surrounding water. The museum is also responsible for providing financial aid to the restoration of culturally significant private ships and boats, and while there is no direct connection between owning a listed vessel and receiving aid, the Maritime Museum has concluded that many owners of listed ships have voiced the opinion that an important way to facilitate the management of listed ships is to increase this financial support. Some owners of listed pleasure boats have voiced that the listing has attracted attention to them and their boats from other boat owners, boat clubs, and in maritime festivals and competitions, as well as from local papers and radio channels.

Commercial and utility ships have been listed since 2001, and pleasure boats since 2009. Sweden was the first country in Europe to list pleasure boats.

The museum made an evaluation of its listing of ships in 2014, and of the listing of pleasure boats in 2017.

=== Listing of ships ===
For a ship to be eligible for inclusion on the historic ship list, it must meet the following criteria:

- It has to be at least 12 metres (39 ft) long and 4 metres (13 ft) wide.
- It has to be at least 50 years old or of such an age and character that it can be deemed significant from a cultural perspective.
- It was built or constructed in Sweden, or was registered in Sweden for a prolonged period or else deemed to be of very high value for the promotion of knowledge about the maritime history of Sweden.
- Commercial and utility vessels smaller than 12 by 4 metres can be eligible if there are special reasons.

The owner of the ship submits an application to the museum containing, among other things, an account of the ship's history and its present state of preservation. The museum then makes an assessment based on seven criteria, taken from the handbook of assessing listed buildings issued by the Swedish National Heritage Board and adopted to maritime conditions. Listed ships are graded by the museum between I and III, where I represents the highest grade of cultural value.

=== Listing of pleasure boats ===
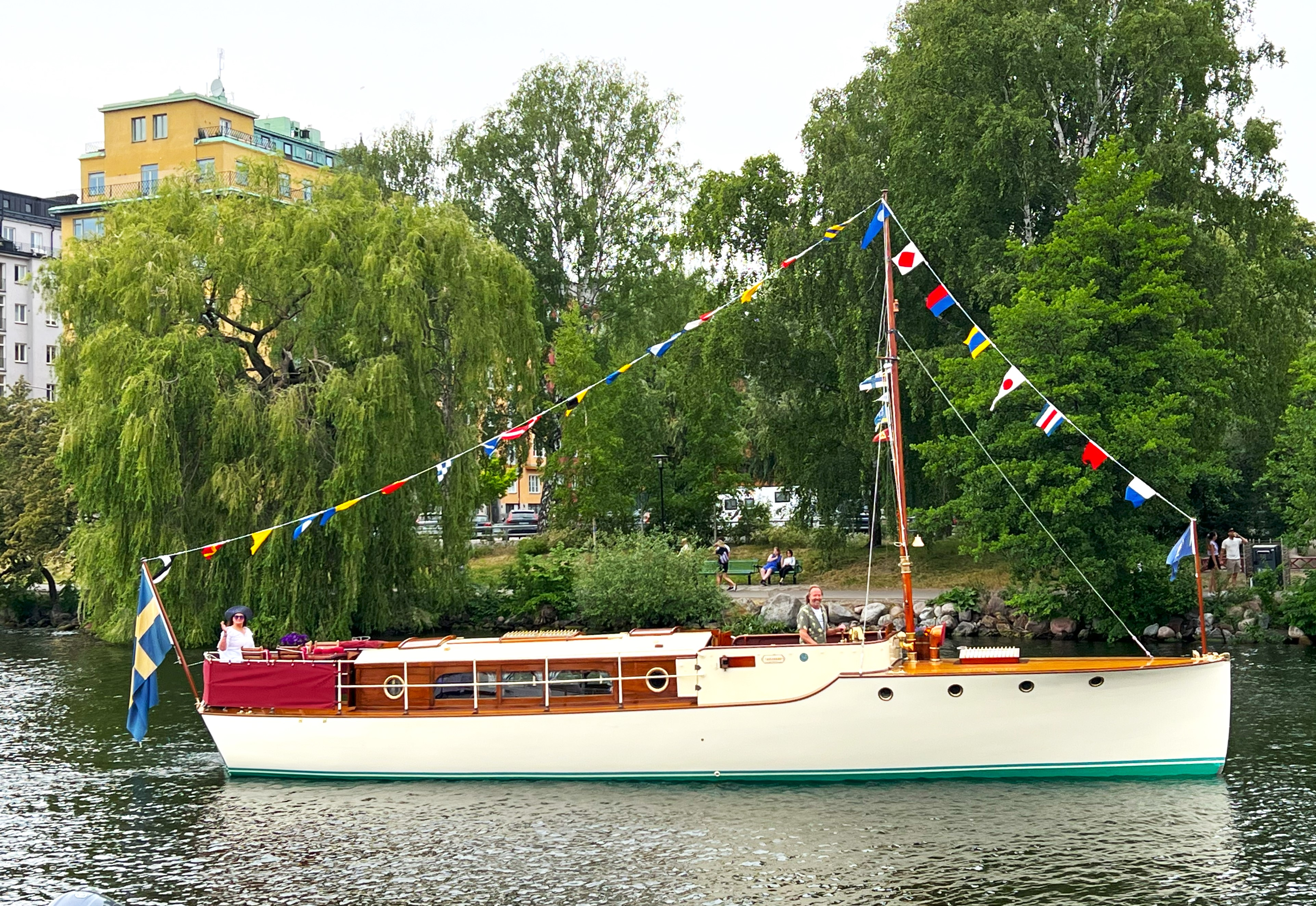
Saraband, a listed pleasure boat designed by Carl Gustaf Pettersson and built in 1914

The following criteria must to be fulfilled for a boat to be eligible for listing by the museum:

- The boat was originally built as a pleasure craft.
- The boat was built in Sweden; or designed by a Swedish boat constructor; or is of a model which has been popular in Sweden; or in some other way considered important to preserve from a cultural perspective.
- It was built before 1965; boats constructed later may be considered for listing if they are large and have extraordinary cultural significance.
- The boat's history must be well-documented.
- It must be in a good and seaworthy condition. Repairs and alterations must have been made in a considerate way.
- The boat must not be a copy or reproduction of another vessel.
- Only individual boats are considered eligible, not entire series or models of boats.

The owner of the boat may apply twice a year to have the boat listed. If a boat is listed and at a later point sold, the museum asks the owner to provide contact details to the new owner of the pleasure craft in order to be able to maintain knowledge about the fate of these boats.

== Traditional-ship classification ==
The Maritime Museum also conducts Traditional-ship classification (T-classing) of ships of historic value. The classification is aimed at guaranteeing the seaworthiness of the ship while maintaining its historic value and allows older ships to obtain certificates needed in order to sail in international waters.

== See also ==
- Listed buildings in Sweden
