= Hästholmen (Skogsön) =

Island in the Stockholm archipelago and Vaxholm municipality, Sweden

- Location within Stockholm Location within Sweden Location within European Union
- Coordinates: 59°22′14.0″N 18°25′58.6″E
- Country: Sweden
- Province: Uppland
- County: Stockholm County
- Municipality: Vaxholm Municipality
- Time zone: UTC+1 (CET)
  - Summer (DST): UTC+2 (CEST)

Hästholmen is an island in the Stockholm archipelago in Sweden. Skogsön island lies to its north-west, Tynningö island to its south-west, and the Oxdjupet strait to its east. Administratively, it is in Vaxholm Municipality and Stockholm County.

Hästholmen has no road connection to the mainland or other islands. It is served from spring to autumn by passenger ships of the Waxholmsbolaget, providing a connection to Vaxholm town and Stockholm city, but there is no service in winter.

This island should not be mistaken for the double-island of Stegesund-Hästholmen, also in Vaxholm Municipality, but situated some 8 kilometres (5.0 mi) to the north-west.

== Gallery ==
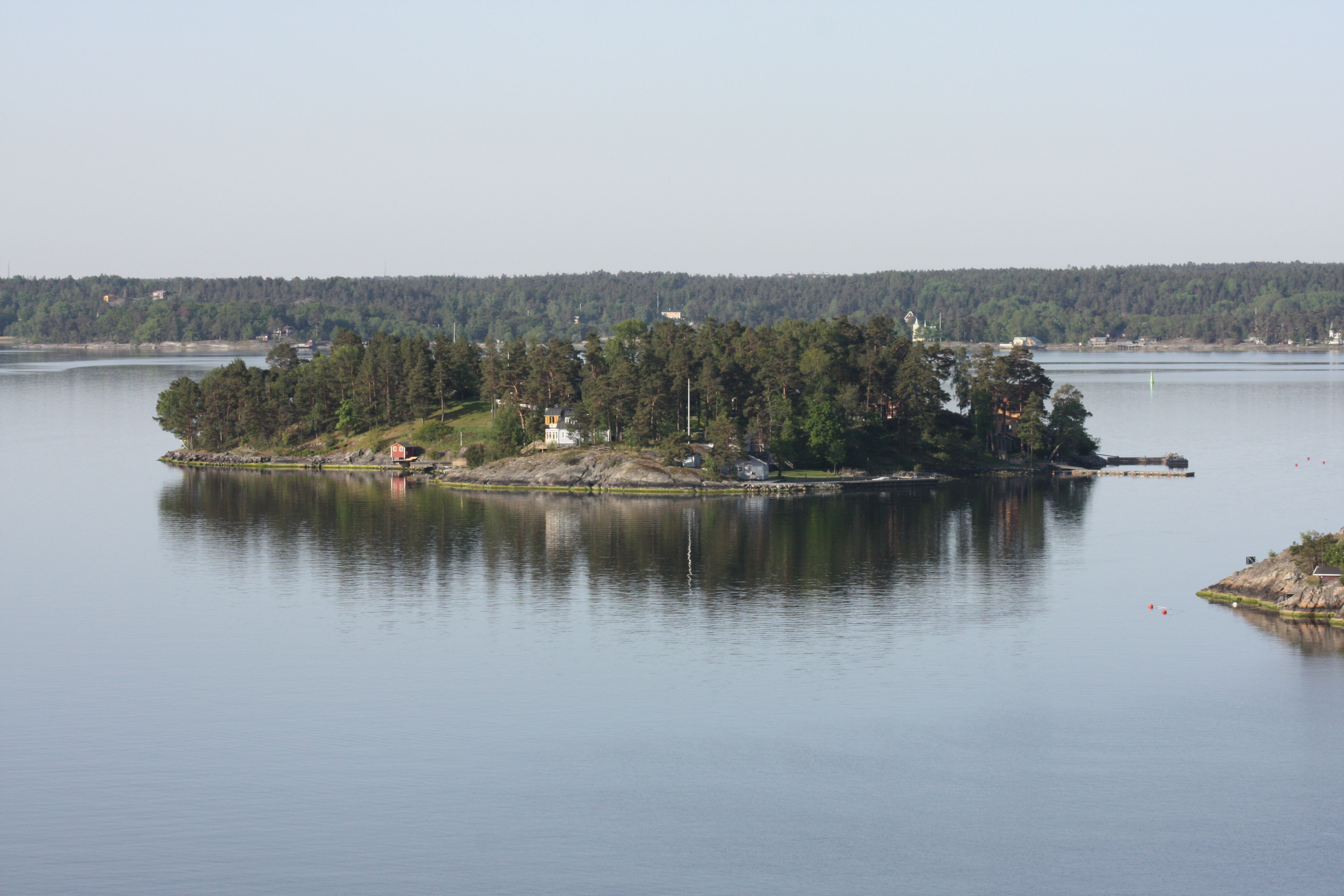
Hästholmen seen from the east

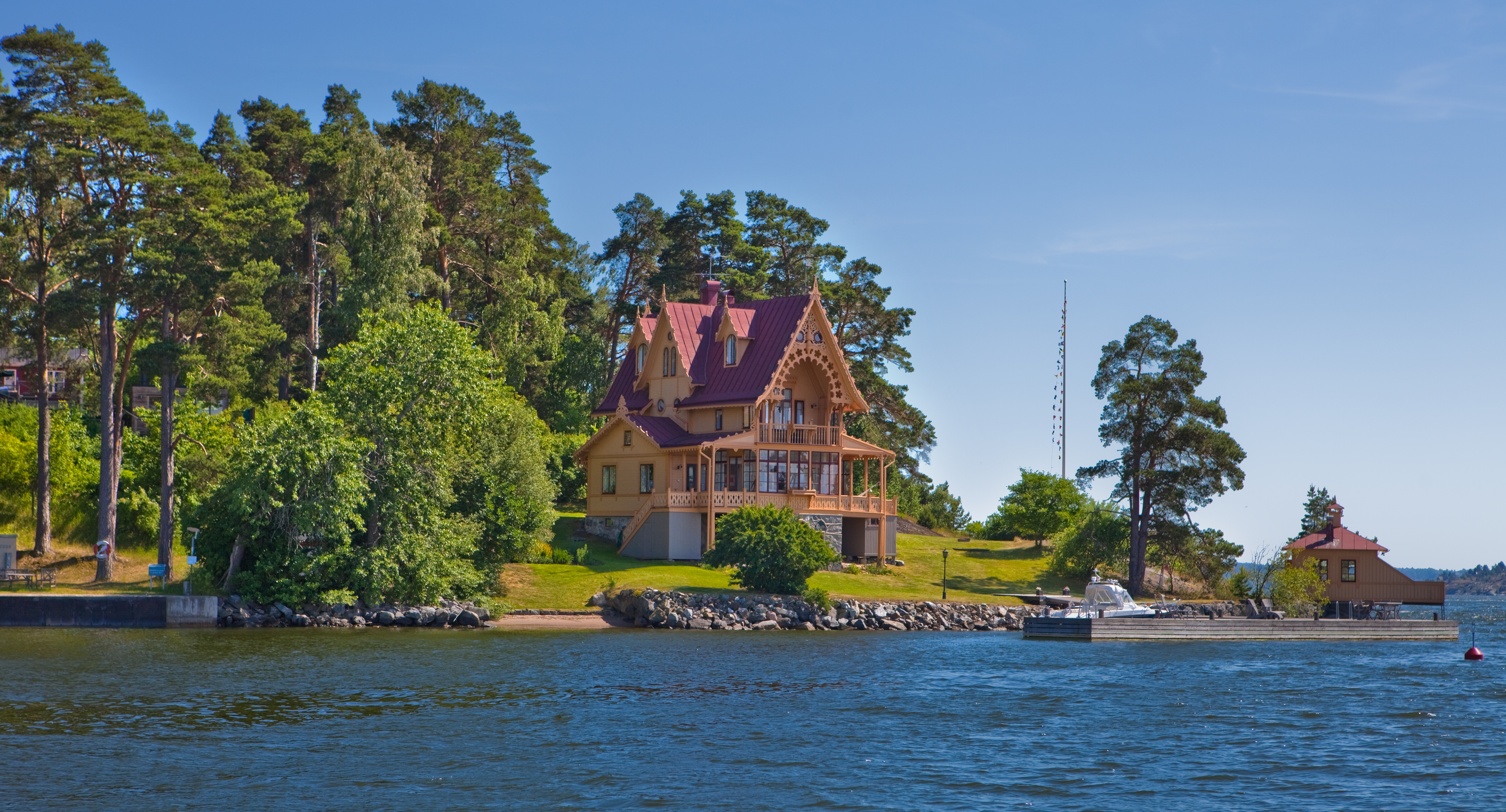
The Ginger House on Hästholmen

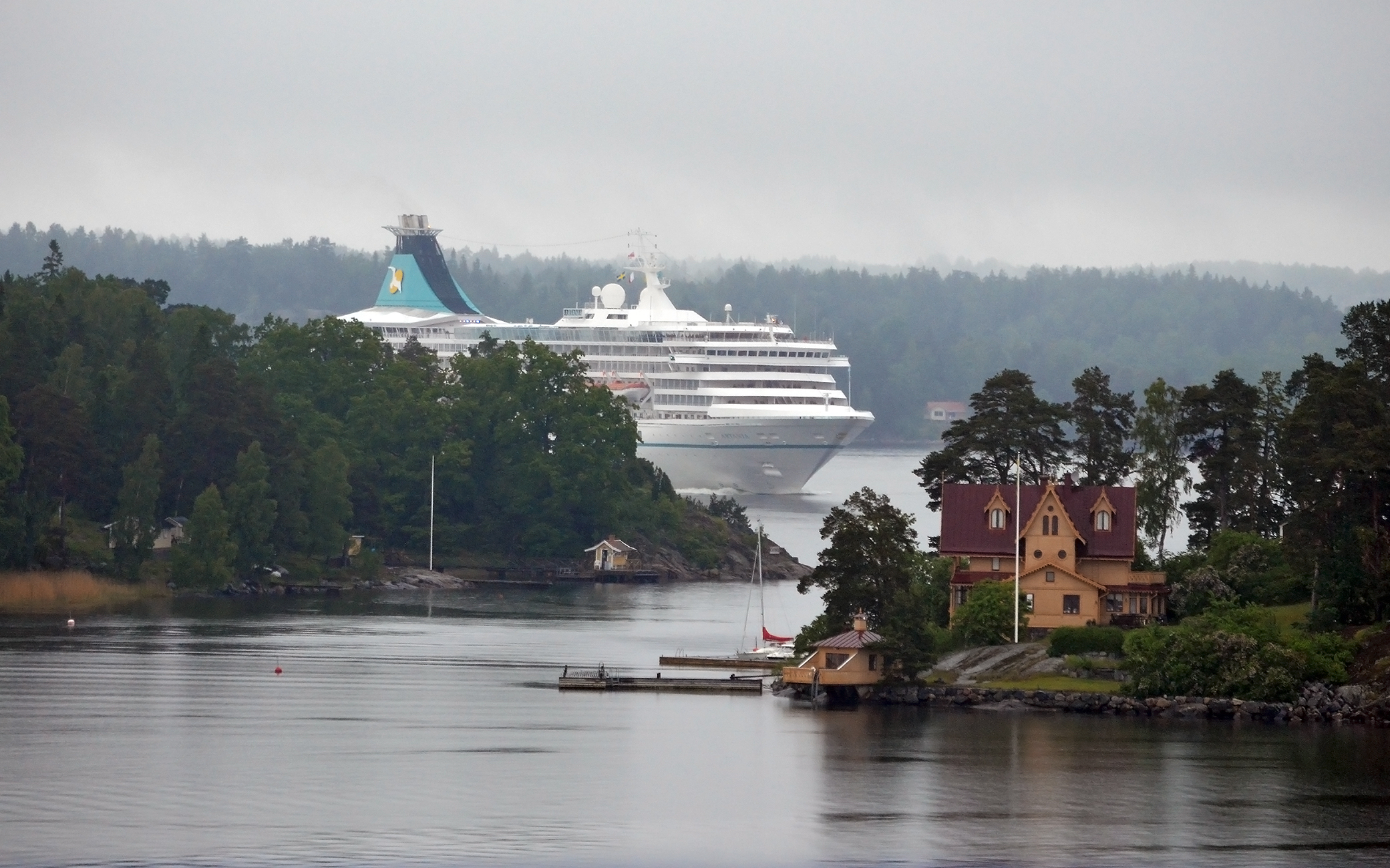
Cruise ship in the Oxdjupet strait, with Hästholmen to right
