= Edholma =

Island in the Stockholm archipelago and Vaxholm municipality, Sweden

- Location within Stockholm Location within Sweden Location within European Union
- Coordinates: 59°24′58″N 18°20′12″E
- Country: Sweden
- Province: Uppland
- County: Stockholm County
- Municipality: Vaxholm Municipality
- Time zone: UTC+1 (CET)
  - Summer (DST): UTC+2 (CEST)

Edholma is an island in the Stockholm archipelago in Sweden. It is situated to the north of the island of Vaxön, to the south of the island of Resarö, to the east of the island of Kullö, and to the west of the Kodjupet strait. Administratively, it is in Vaxholm Municipality and Stockholm County. The island has approximately 100 holiday homes and five permanent residences.

Edholma has no road connection to the mainland or other islands. It is served throughout the year by passenger ships of the Waxholmsbolaget, which call at a pier on the eastern end of the island, providing a connection to Vaxholm town and Stockholm city.

Historically the island was farmed, with the farm including 35 acres (14 ha) of arable land and 65 acres (26 ha) of forest. Because of the island's proximity to the Kodjupet strait, which at the time was the main route from the sea to Stockholm, Edholma was fortified from the end of the 19th century to the beginning of the 20th century. Since 1908 the island has been developed with summer houses, and the farm area was divided up for the same purpose at the end of the 1950. The farm's windmill still exists and has been heritage-listed since 1983.

== Gallery ==
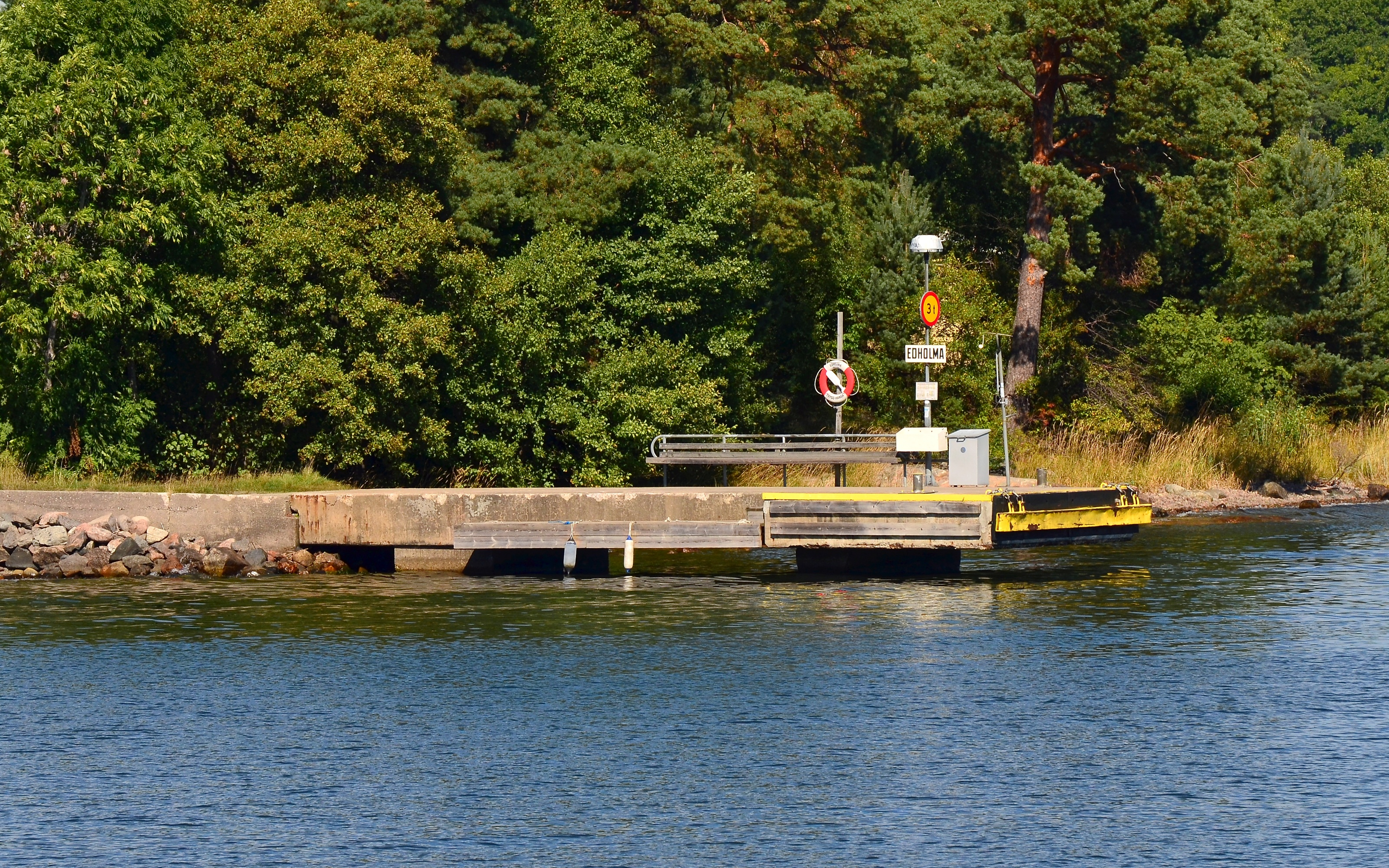
Edholma pier, served by the ships of the Waxholmsbolaget

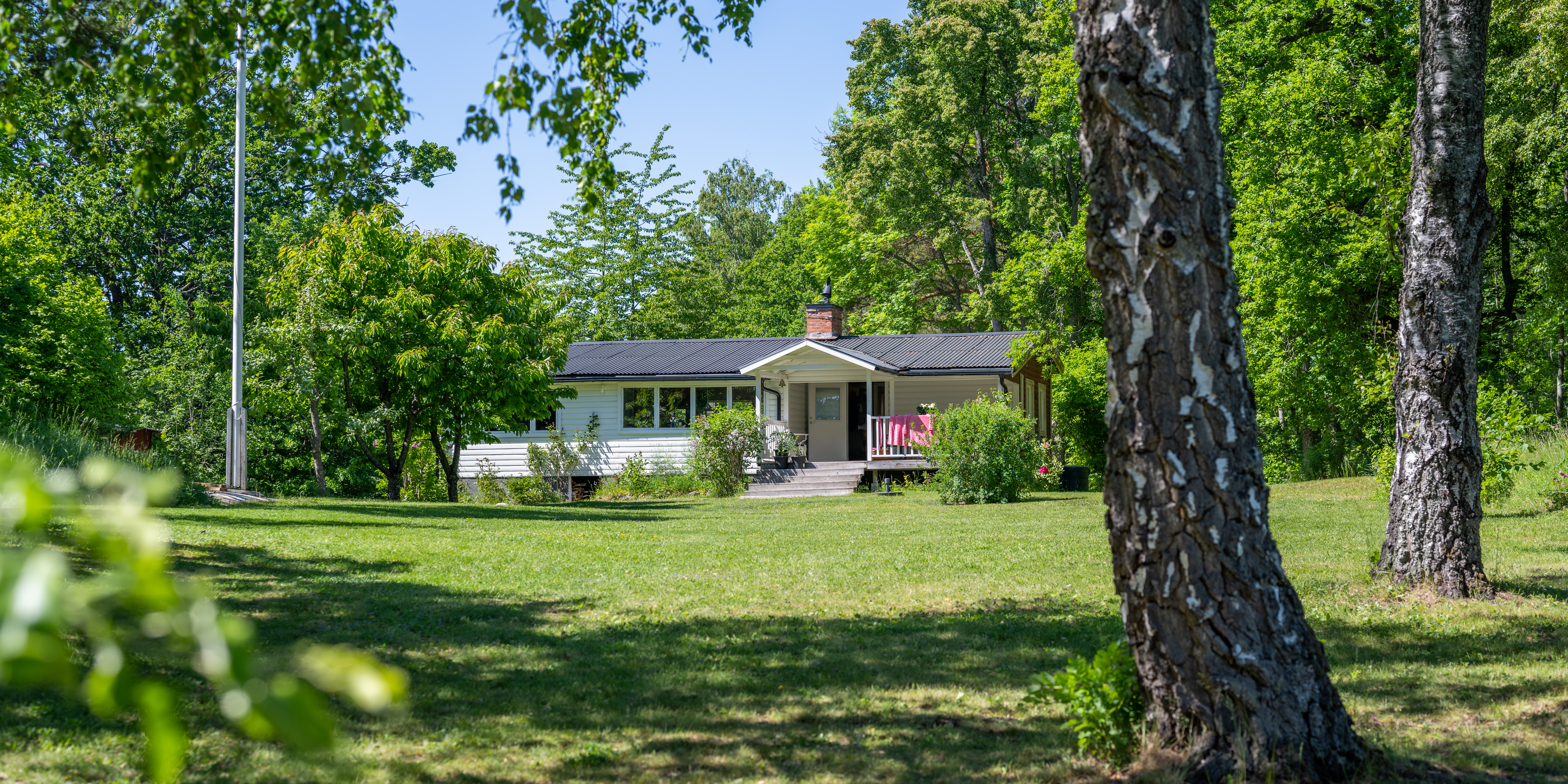
A house on Edholma

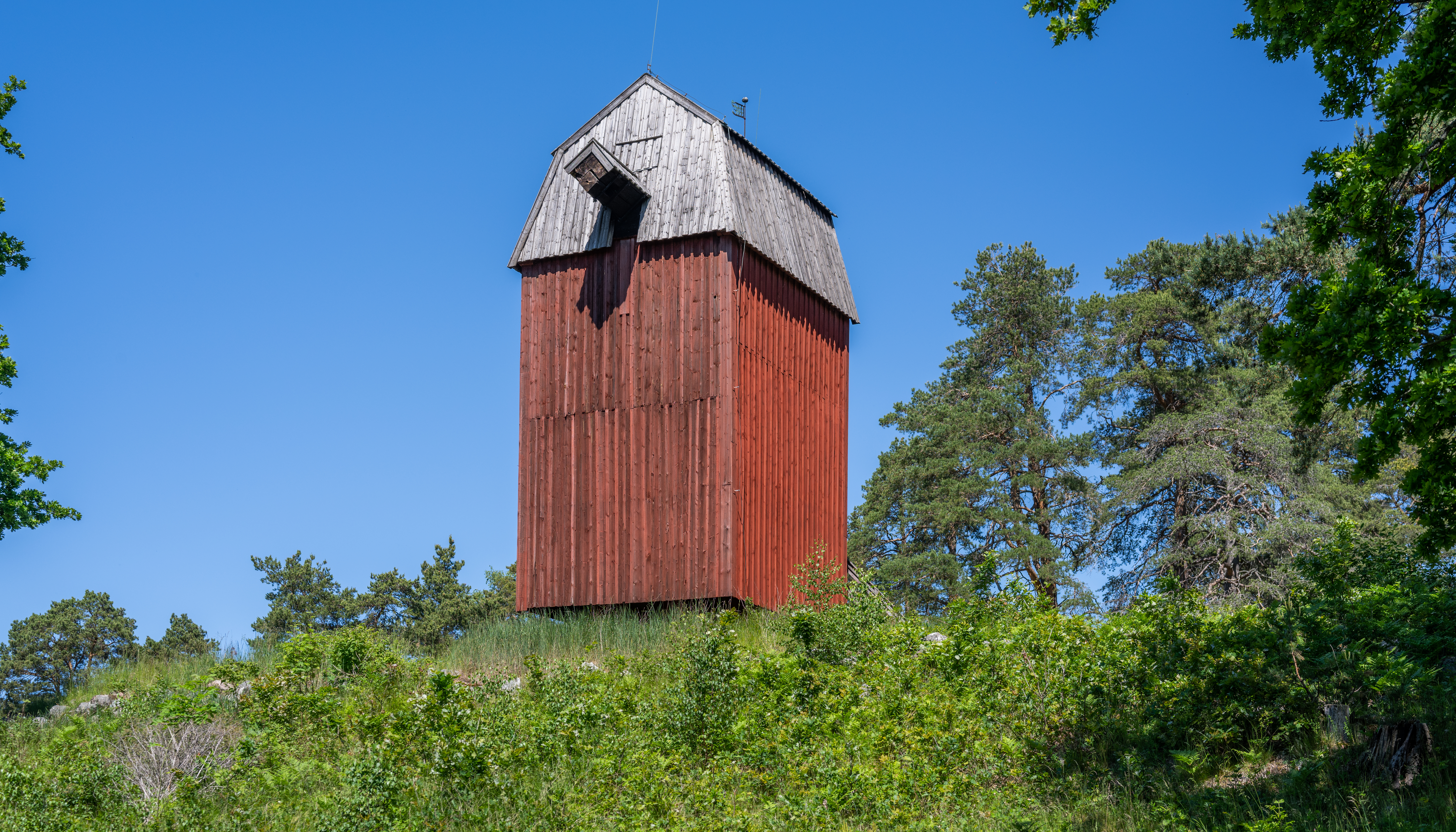
The windmill that remains from the former farm
