= Hästholmen =

Hästholmen may refer to:

- Hästholmen nature reserve, a nature reserve in Värmdö Municipality, Stockholm County, Sweden
- Hästholmen, Östergötland, a locality situated in Ödeshög Municipality, Östergötland County, Sweden
- Hästholmen (Skogsön), an island south of Skogsön, in Vaxholm Municipality, Stockholm County, Sweden
- Stegesund-Hästholmen, an island north of Vaxholm, in Vaxholm Municipality, Stockholm County, Sweden
