= Kodjupet =

Strait in Sweden's Stockholm Archipelago

Coordinates: 59°25′15″N 18°20′15″E

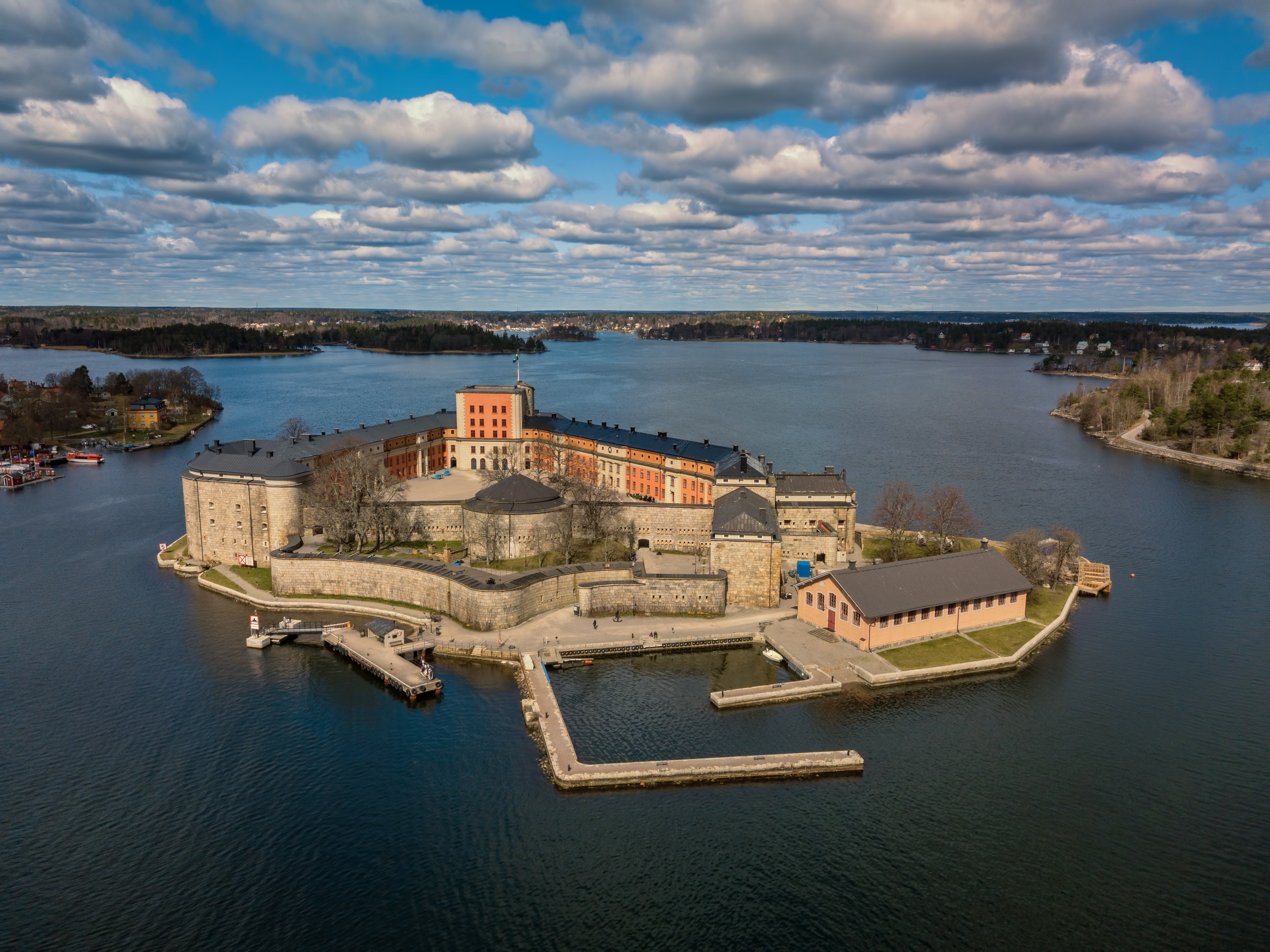
The Vaxholm fortress occupies the centre of the Kodjupet strait, with Vaxholm town to the left and Rindö island to the right

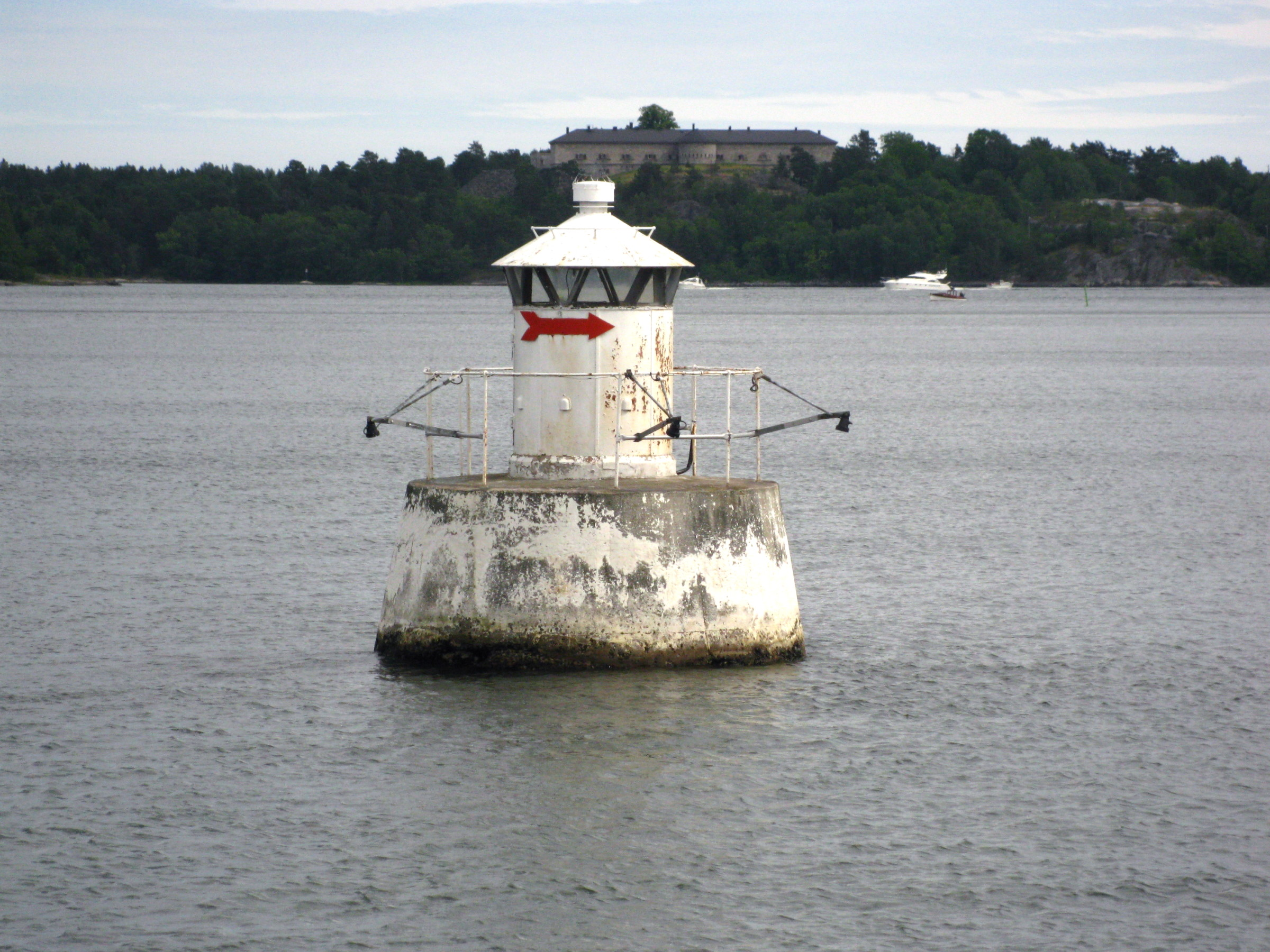
Kodjupets lighthouse marks the route between Edholma and Stegesund-Hästholmen with Rindö in the background

Kodjupet is a strait in Sweden's Stockholm Archipelago. Along with the Oxdjupet strait, it is one of two shipping routes connecting the open sea to the city of Stockholm, passing either side of the island of Rindö. Today the Kodjupet is suitable only for smaller vessels, due to its narrow and twisting nature together with a minimum water depth of 3.3 metres (11 ft), but it was formerly the principal route for commercial and naval ships. It passes close offshore of the town of Vaxholm.

Although winding in nature, the strait runs broadly from north to south on its route from the sea to the city. It is flanked by the islands of Resarö, Edholma and Vaxön to the west, and Stegesund-Hästholmen, Skarpö and Rindö to the east. The very narrow Stegesundet strait provides a short-cut to the northern part of the Kodjupet strait, passing between the islands of Stegesund-Hästholmen and Skarpö.

In 1548, Gustav Vasa constructed the Vaxholm Fortress on an islet in the middle of the southern part of the Kodjupet strait between Vaxön and Rindö. The Oxdjupet strait was, at the same time, artificially reduced in depth in order to prevent its use. Thus, the fortress was strategically situated to defend the city of Stockholm against shipborne attacks from the sea. The fortress has resisted several attacks, has been rebuilt on a number of occasions, and still stands. By the latter half of the 19th century, the Kodjupet strait was proving problematic for the period's larger ships, and in 1879 the main shipping route into Stockholm was diverted to use the Oxdjupet strait, which was dredged to remove its previous artificial obstructions.

The strait is crossed by the Vaxholmsleden car ferry, which connects Vaxholm to Rindö, and by the Kastellet ferry, an electrically powered cable ferry that provides passenger access to Vaxholm Fortress.
