= Skogsön =

Island in the Stockholm archipelago and Vaxholm municipality, Sweden

- Location within Stockholm Location within Sweden Location within European Union
- Coordinates: 59°22′14.0″N 18°25′58.6″E
- Country: Sweden
- Province: Uppland
- County: Stockholm County
- Municipality: Vaxholm Municipality
- Time zone: UTC+1 (CET)
  - Summer (DST): UTC+2 (CEST)

Skogsön is an island in the Stockholm archipelago in Sweden. Rindö island lies to its north, Tynningö island to its south-west, Ramsö island to its north-west, and the Oxdjupet strait to its east. Administratively, it is in Vaxholm Municipality and Stockholm County.

Skogsön has no road connection to the mainland or other islands. It is served throughout the year by passenger ships of the Waxholmsbolaget, which call at piers at Skogsö Södra and Skogsö Udde, providing a connection to Vaxholm town and Stockholm city.

== Gallery ==
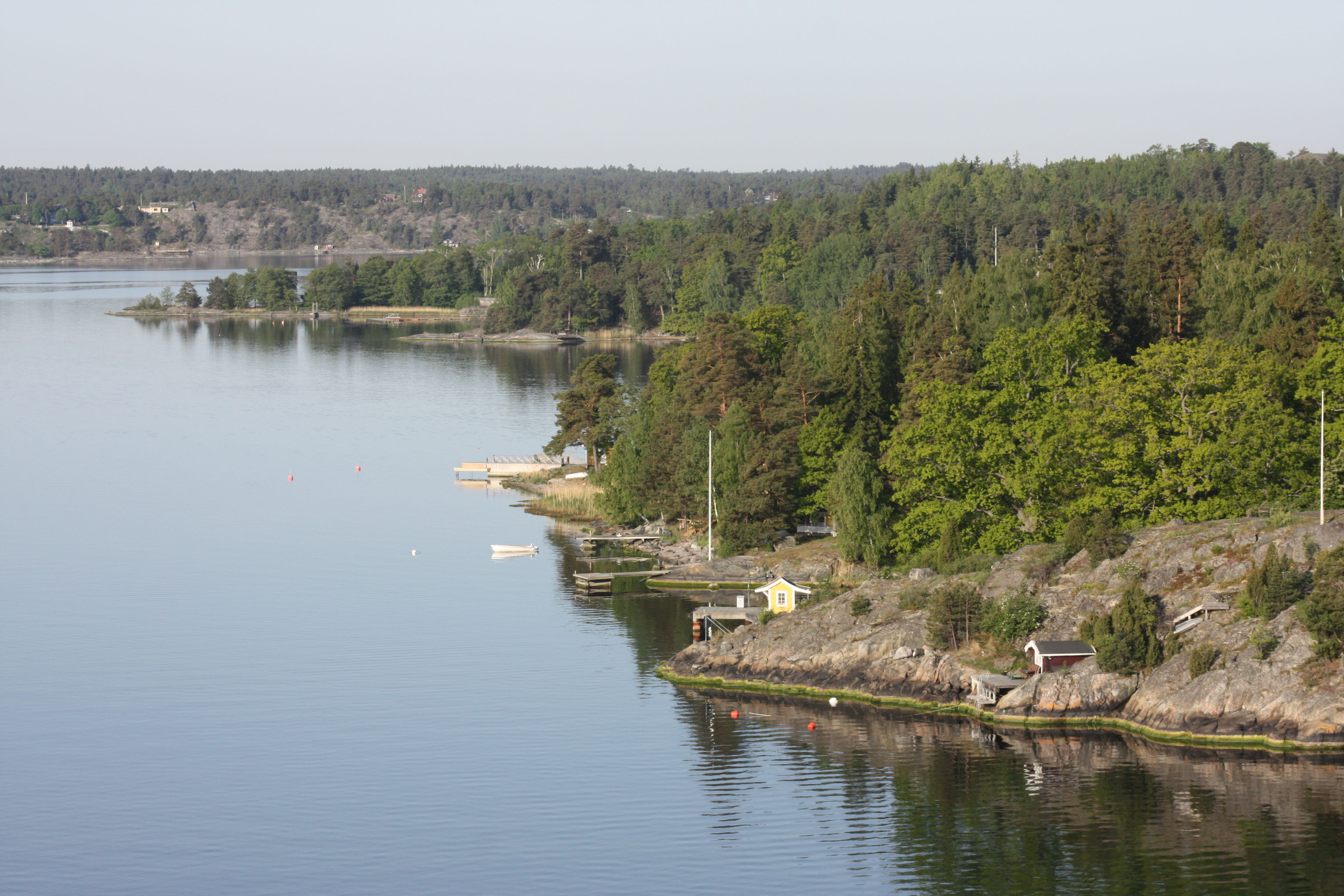
The east of the island, with Skogsö Södra pier in foreground

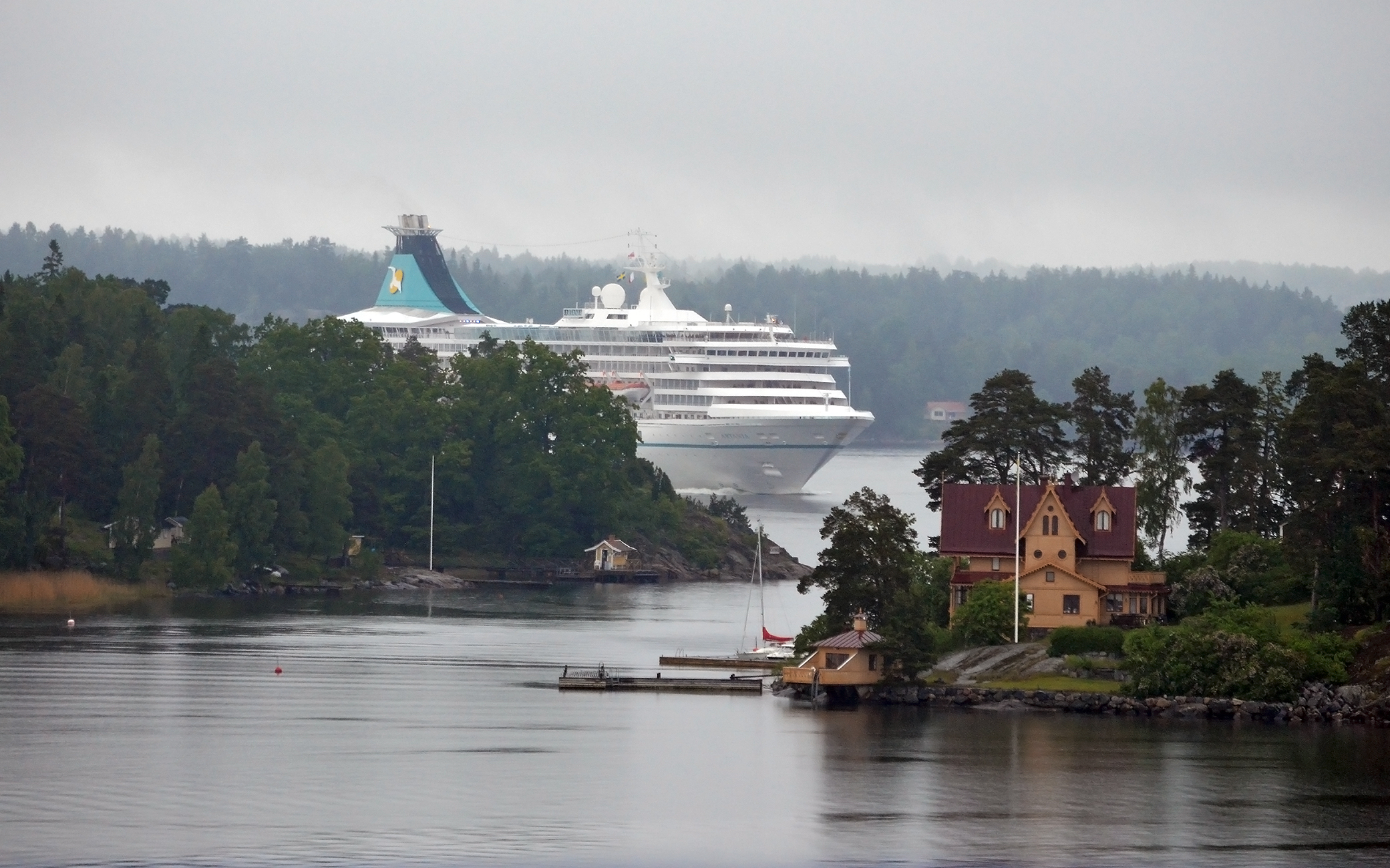
Cruise ship in the Oxdjupet strait, with Skogsön to left
