= Stegesund-Hästholmen =

Island in the Stockholm archipelago and Vaxholm municipality, Sweden

- Location within Stockholm Location within Sweden Location within European Union
- Coordinates: 59°25′N 18°22′E
- Country: Sweden
- Province: Uppland
- County: Stockholm County
- Municipality: Vaxholm Municipality
- Time zone: UTC+1 (CET)
  - Summer (DST): UTC+2 (CEST)

Stegesund-Hästholmen is an island, sometimes considered a pair of islands, in the Stockholm archipelago in Sweden. Stegesund-Hästholmen is situated in Vaxholm Municipality and Stockholm County. Hästholmen (to the west) and Stegesund (to the east) are separated by an artificial channel, constructed in 1899, and connected by a bridge. The island has a permanent population of about 20 people.

To the north, west and south, Stegesund-Hästholmen is separated from the islands of Resarö, Edholma and Vaxön by the winding northern section of the Kodjupet strait, whilst to the east it is separated from the island of Skarpö by the much narrower Stegesundet strait. The artificial channel between Stegesund and Hästholmen is only navigable by very small boats, such as dinghies and canoes.

Stegesund-Hästholmen has no road connection to the mainland or other islands. It is served throughout the year by passenger ships of the Waxholmsbolaget, which call at either the Vikingsborg pier (on Hästholmen) or the Stegesund pier (on Stegesund), providing a connection to Vaxholm town and Stockholm city.

== Gallery ==
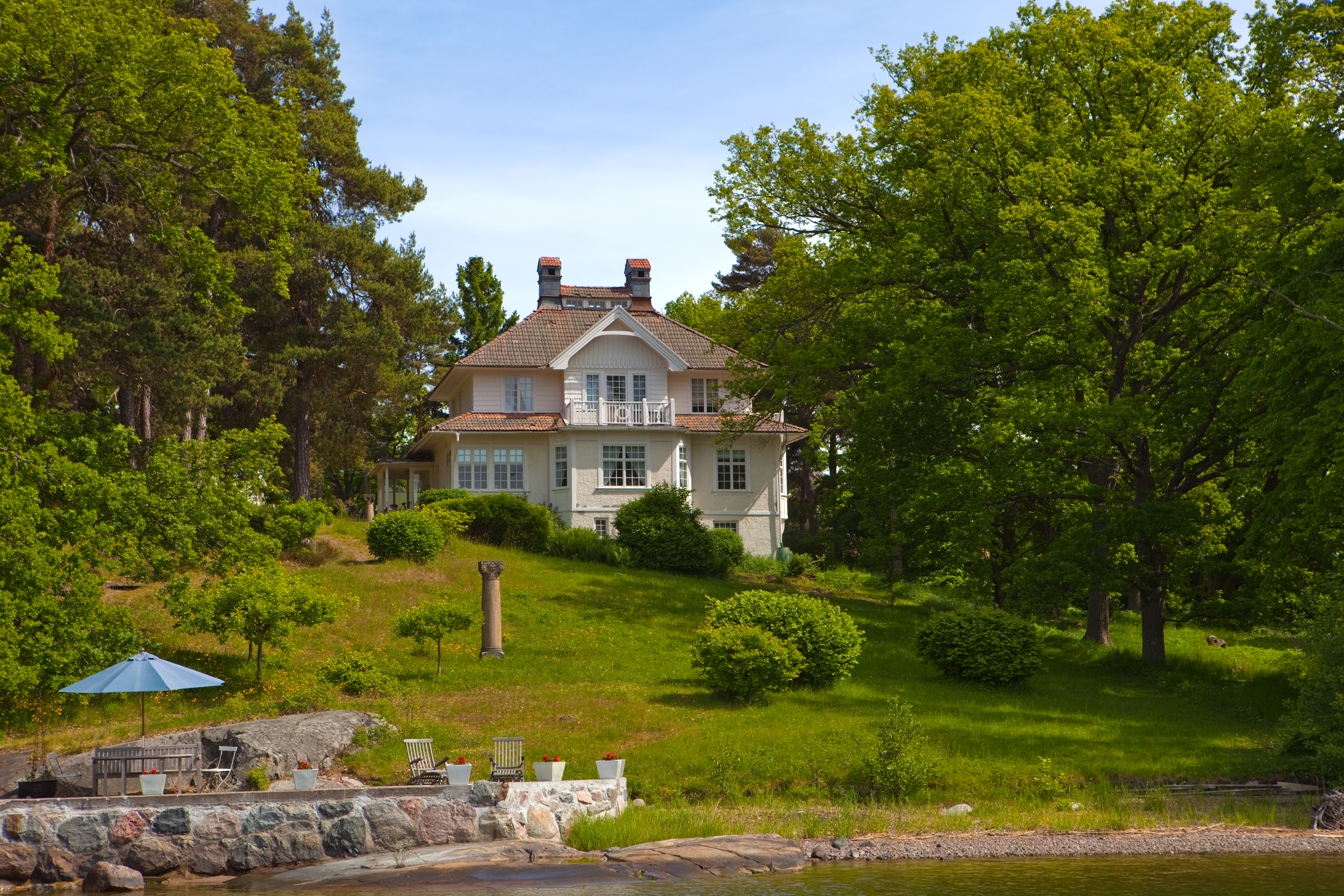
House on Hästholmen

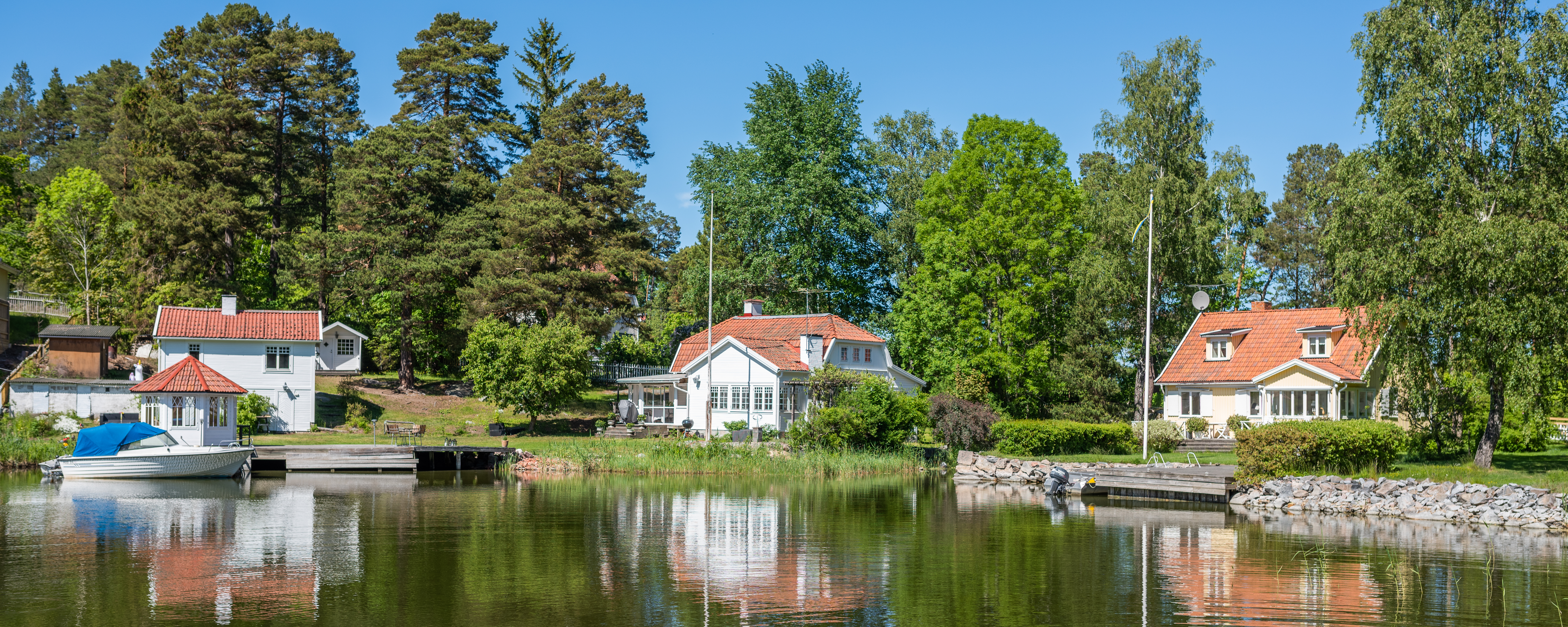
Houses on Hästholmen (left) and Stegesund (right)
The entrance to the channel between the two can just be made out between 2nd and 3rd houses

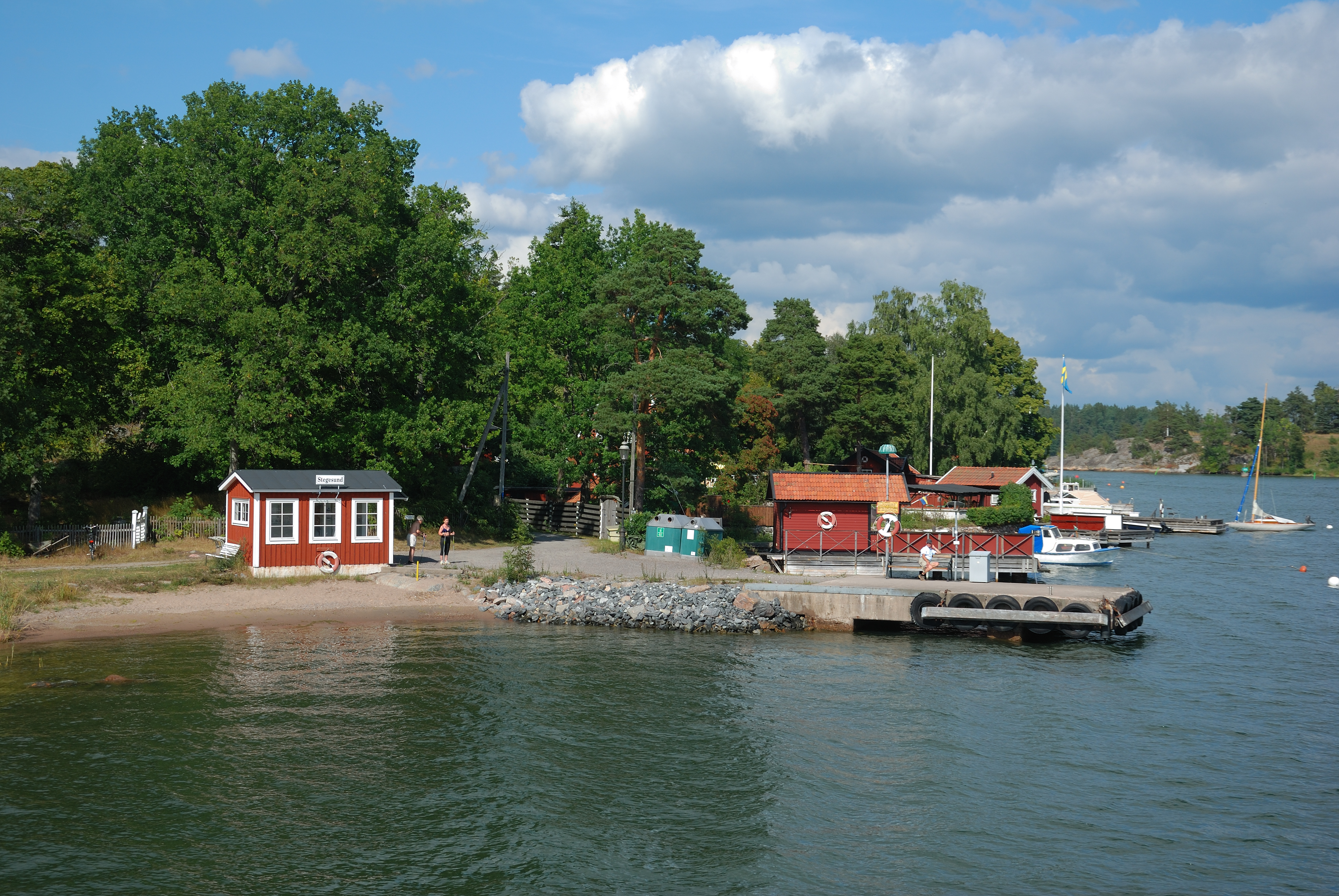
Stegesund pier
