= Kastellet ferry =

Coordinates: 59.402076°N 18.357472°E

Kastelletleden
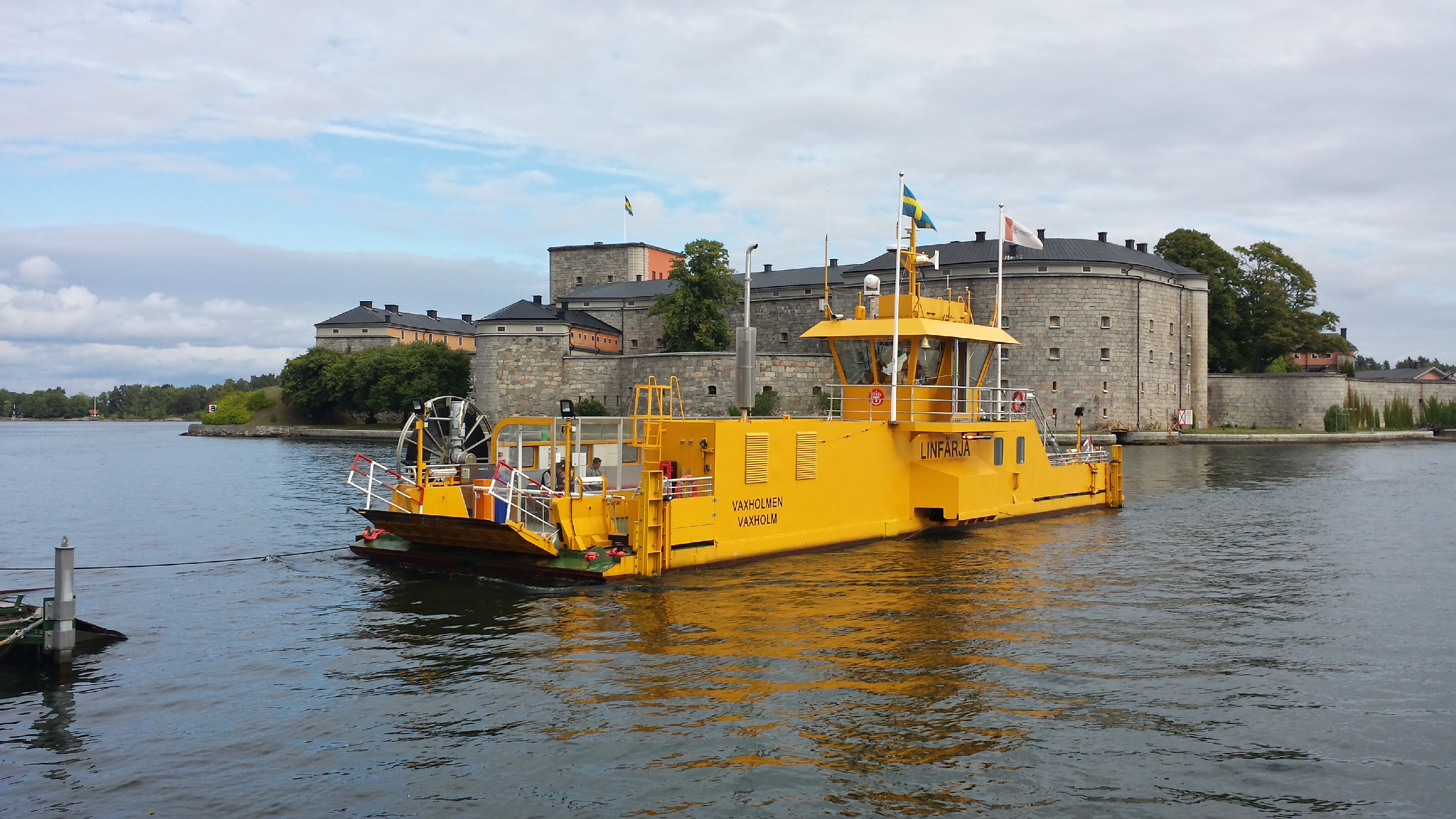
- The ferry underway with Vaxholm Castle behind
- Transit type: Cable ferry
- Carries: 130 passengers
- Operator: Trafikverket
- Travel time: 2 minutes
- Frequency: 2-4 return trips per hour
- No. of vessels: 1 (Vaxholmen)

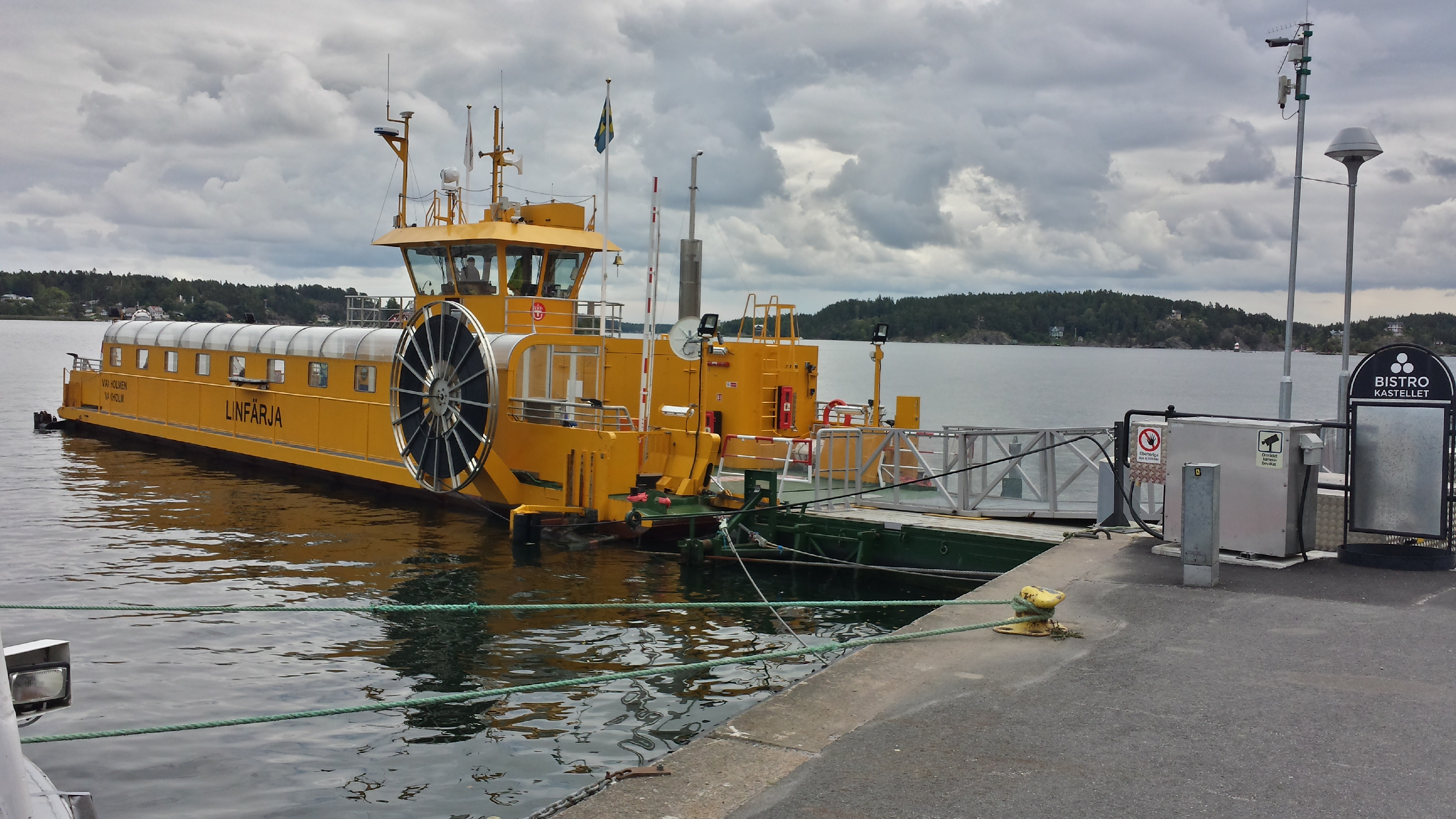
The ferry at its town terminal, showing the large drum that carries the electrical power cable, which can also been seen attached at the land end.

The Kastellet ferry (Swedish: Kastelletleden), also known as the Vaxholmen ferry, is a passenger cable ferry in Sweden's Stockholm archipelago. It connects the town of Vaxholm to Vaxholm Castle, situated on an islet in the middle of the Kodjupet strait between the town and the island of Rindö. At its town terminus, the ferry berths next to the quay used by the Waxholmsbolaget passenger ferries that link Vaxholm to central Stockholm and many other islands of the archipelago.

The crossing is some 200 metres (660 ft) in length and takes about 2 minutes. There are between two and four return crossings an hour, each of which conveys a maximum of 130 passengers. The service only operates from the start of May to the end of September.

The ferry is run by Trafikverket under contract to the Vaxholm Municipality. The municipality is responsible for defining timetables, ticket prices and ferry conditions, while Trafikverket is responsible for operating the ferry.

== Vessel ==
The vessel used on the crossing is named Vaxholmen and is electrically powered, using a supply cable attached to the shore at the Vaxholm end and paid out on a drum on the vessel. The power cable is lowered to the bottom of the channel when the vessel is docked at Vaxholm Castle, as are the guidance cables when the ferry is docked at either terminal, thus allowing shipping to transit the channel. The Vaxholmen was built in 1967, but reconstructed and converted to electrical power in 2015, in time for the opening of the new service in 2016. She is 28 metres (92 ft) in length, 9 metres (30 ft) in width, and has a draught of 0.9 metres (2 ft 11 in).
