= Stegesundet =

Coordinates: 59°24′53″N 18°22′18″E

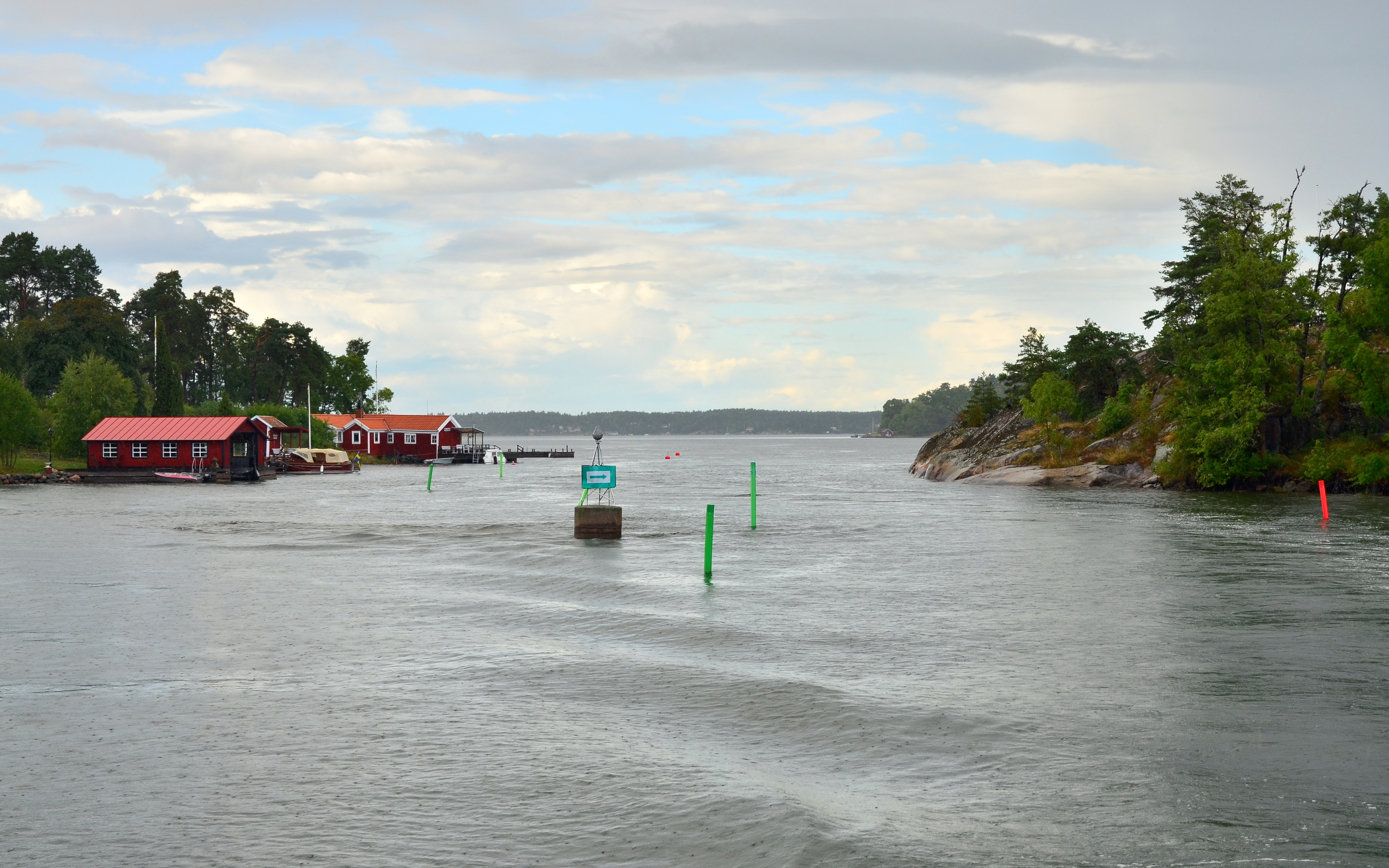
The narrowest part of the Stegesundet between Stegesund-Hästholmen (left) and Skarpö (right)

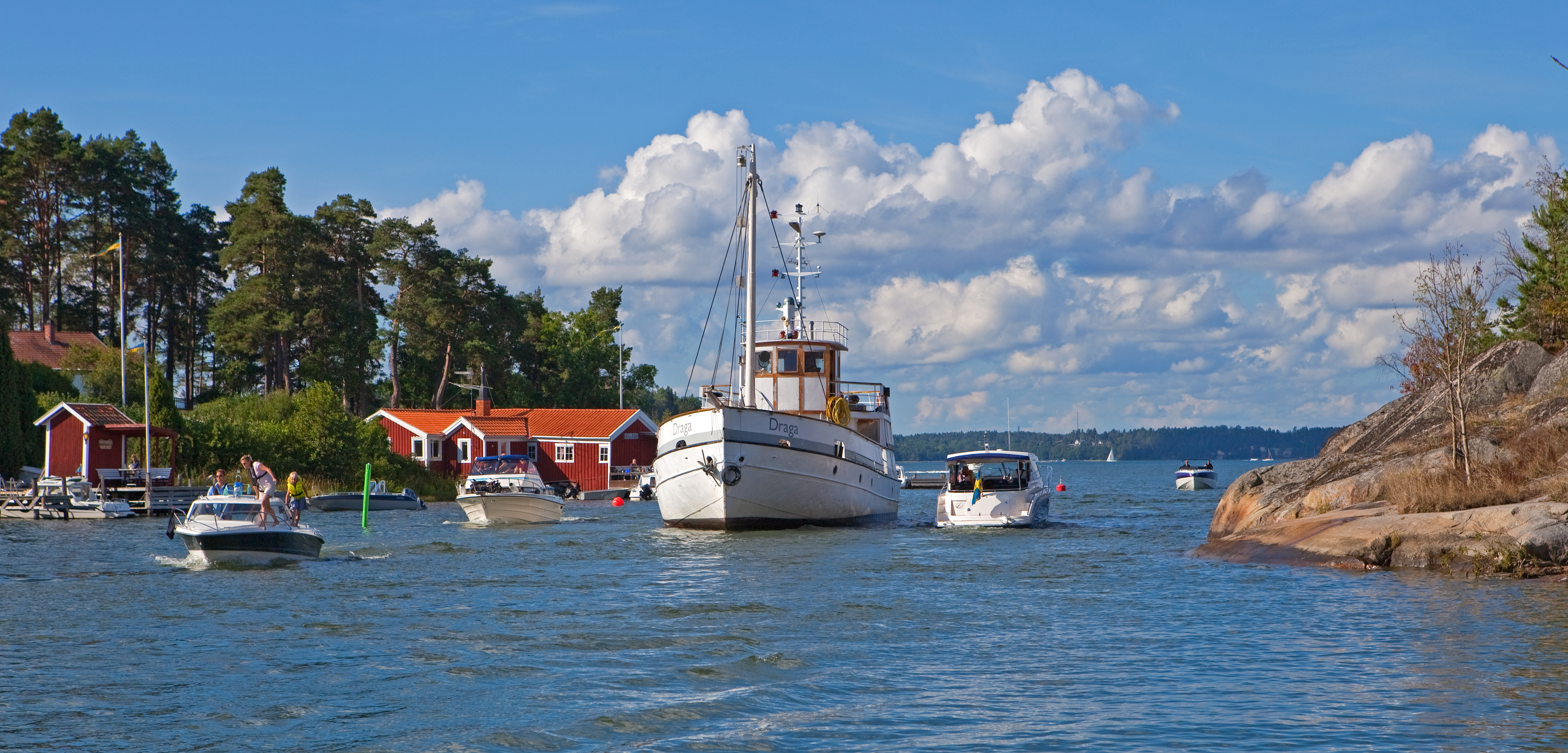
The 1917-built MV Draga passing through the Stegesundet

Stegesundet is a very narrow strait in Sweden's Stockholm Archipelago. It separates the islands of Stegesund-Hästholmen (to the west) and Skarpö (to the east), and provides a shorter route than the section of the Kodjupet strait that passes to the west of Stegesund-Hästholmen.

The strait is too restricted for most commercial shipping, but is used by pleasure craft, Waxholmsbolaget ships, and other local ferries. Some of the Waxholmsbolaget ships and local ferries call at Stegesund and Skarpöborg piers on either side of the strait.
