= Vaxholm Municipality =

Vaxholm Municipality Vaxholms kommun
- Municipality
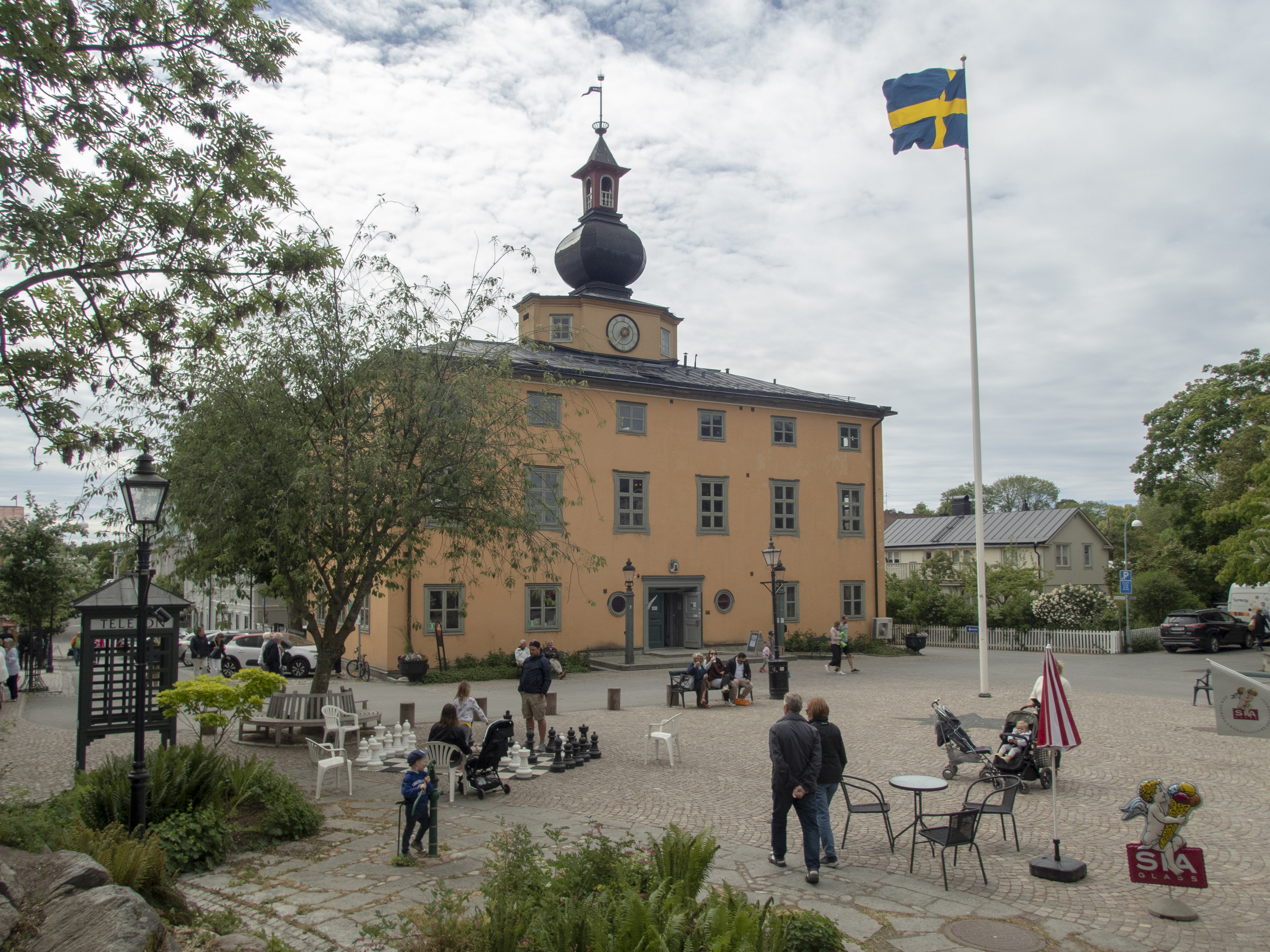
- Vaxholms town hall

- Coat of arms

- Coordinates: 59°25′N 18°19′E
- Country: Sweden
- County: Stockholm County
- Seat: Vaxholm

Area
  - Total: 107.07 km^{2} (41.34 sq mi)
  - Land: 57.88 km^{2} (22.35 sq mi)
  - Water: 49.19 km^{2} (18.99 sq mi)
- Area as of 1 January 2014.

Population (30 June 2025)
  - Total: 11,785
  - Density: 203.6/km^{2} (527.3/sq mi)
- Demonyms: Vaxholmer; Vaxholmite; Vaxholmian; Waxholmer; Waxholmite; Waxholmian
- Time zone: UTC+1 (CET)
  - Summer (DST): UTC+2 (CEST)
- ISO 3166 code: SE
- Province: Uppland
- Municipal code: 0187
- Website: www.vaxholm.se
- Density is calculated using land area only.

Vaxholm Municipality (Swedish: Vaxholms kommun, semi-officially Vaxholms stad) is a municipality in Stockholm County in east central Sweden. The municipal slogan is "Vaxholm – the capital of the archipelago", due to its central location in the archipelago. Its seat is located in the city of Vaxholm.

From 1974 to 1984 Vaxholm was united with Österåker Municipality, making up a municipality called Vaxholm, but with the seat in Åkersberga. After the "divorce" the new Vaxholm Municipality came out larger than it had been before the amalgamation. The municipality prefers to style itself City of Vaxholm.

== Geography ==
The municipality is located within the Stockholm archipelago some 17 kilometres (11 mi) north-east of the city of Stockholm. It includes the Bogesundslandet peninsula, along with 64 islands and islets. Principal islands include Edholma, Edlunda, Granholmen, Hästholmen, Kullö, Ramsö, Resarö, Rindö, Risholmen, Skarpö, Skogsön, Stegesund-Hästholmen, Tynningö, Vaxholmen and Vaxön.

The municipality includes five urban areas or localities as defined by Statistics Sweden. These are Resarö, Rindö, Skarpö, Tynningö and Vaxholm. In 2010, Kullö was also considered an urban area, but it has now been redefined as part of the Vaxholm urban area.

Other, less formally defined, places within the municipality include Karlsudd, Rindöby, Rindö smedja and Ytterby. Ytterby is known for its geology, and for the fact that no less than eight chemical elements were first discovered there.

== Demography ==
=== Population development ===
Population development in Vaxholm Municipality 1970–2019
Year	Population
1970	4,786
1975	4,874
1980	4,851
1985	6,325
1990	6,779
1995	8,215
2000	9,286
2005	10,123
2010	10,965
2015	11,380
2017	11,831
2019	12,003
Source: SCB - Folkmängd efter region och år.

=== Income and Education ===
The population in Vaxholm Municipality has the 8th highest median income per capita in Sweden. The share of highly educated persons, according to Statistics Sweden's definition: persons with post-secondary education that is three years or longer, is 36.4% (national average: 27.0%) and the 14th highest in the country.

=== 2022 by district ===
This is a demographic table based on Vaxholm Municipality's electoral districts in the 2022 Swedish general election sourced from SVT's election platform, in turn taken from SCB official statistics.

In total there were 11,987 residents, including 9,096 Swedish citizens of voting age. 41.6% voted for the left coalition and 57.4% for the right coalition. Indicators are in percentage points except population totals and income.

Location	Residents	Citizen adults	Left vote	Right vote	Employed	Swedish parents	Foreign heritage	Income SEK	Degree
Location			%	%					
Vaxholm M	1,866	1,546	47.0	52.4	80	86	14	28,403	53
Vaxholm NO	1,688	1,207	35.5	63.5	87	91	9	42,532	66
Vaxholm N	2,676	1,770	41.2	57.9	87	90	10	40,997	66
Vaxholm SO	1,642	1,430	39.5	59.6	82	88	12	27,646	55
Vaxholm V	2,249	1,629	46.4	52.8	83	77	23	28,973	49
Vaxholm Ö	1,866	1,514	38.4	60.3	83	88	12	31,845	53
Source: SVT

=== Residents with a foreign background ===
On 31 December 2017 the number of people with a foreign background (persons born outside of Sweden or with two parents born outside of Sweden) was 1 599, or 13.52% of the population (11 831 on 31 December 2017). On 31 December 2002 the number of residents with a foreign background was (per the same definition) 1 044, or 10.84% of the population (9 631 on 31 December 2002). On 31 December 2017 there were 11 831 residents in Vaxholm, of which 1 285 people (10.86%) were born in a country other than Sweden. Divided by country in the table below - the Nordic countries as well as the 12 most common countries of birth outside of Sweden for Swedish residents have been included, with other countries of birth bundled together by continent by Statistics Sweden.

Country of birth
31 December 2017
1	Sweden	10,546
2	European Union: Other countries	239
3	Finland	186
4	Asia: Other countries	153
5	Europe outside of the EU: other countries	82
6	South America	81
7	Poland	67
8	North America	60
9	Norway	53
10	Africa: Other countries	46
11	Thailand	42
12	Germany	41
13	Syria	38
14	Iran	32
15	Eritrea	25
16	Bosnia and Herzegovina	22
17	Afghanistan	20
18	Denmark	19
19	Oceania	14
20	Iraq	13
20	Turkey	13
22	Somalia	12
23	Soviet Union	11
24	Iceland	8
25	Yugoslavia/Yugoslavia; SFR Yugoslavia/Serbia and Montenegro	7
26	Unknown country of birth	1

== Economy ==
The municipality has a significant amount of tourism. Ships transporting passengers between the islands began running on a daily basis in the 1850s. Today, many of islands (among them the main island Vaxholm) can also be reached by bridges from the mainland. The tourist boats depart from Stockholm's Slussen.

== Gallery ==
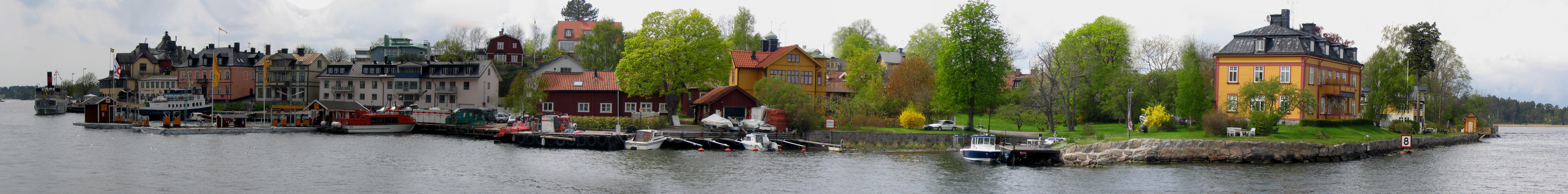
Panorama
