= Rindö (locality) =

Rindö Oskar-Fredriksborg
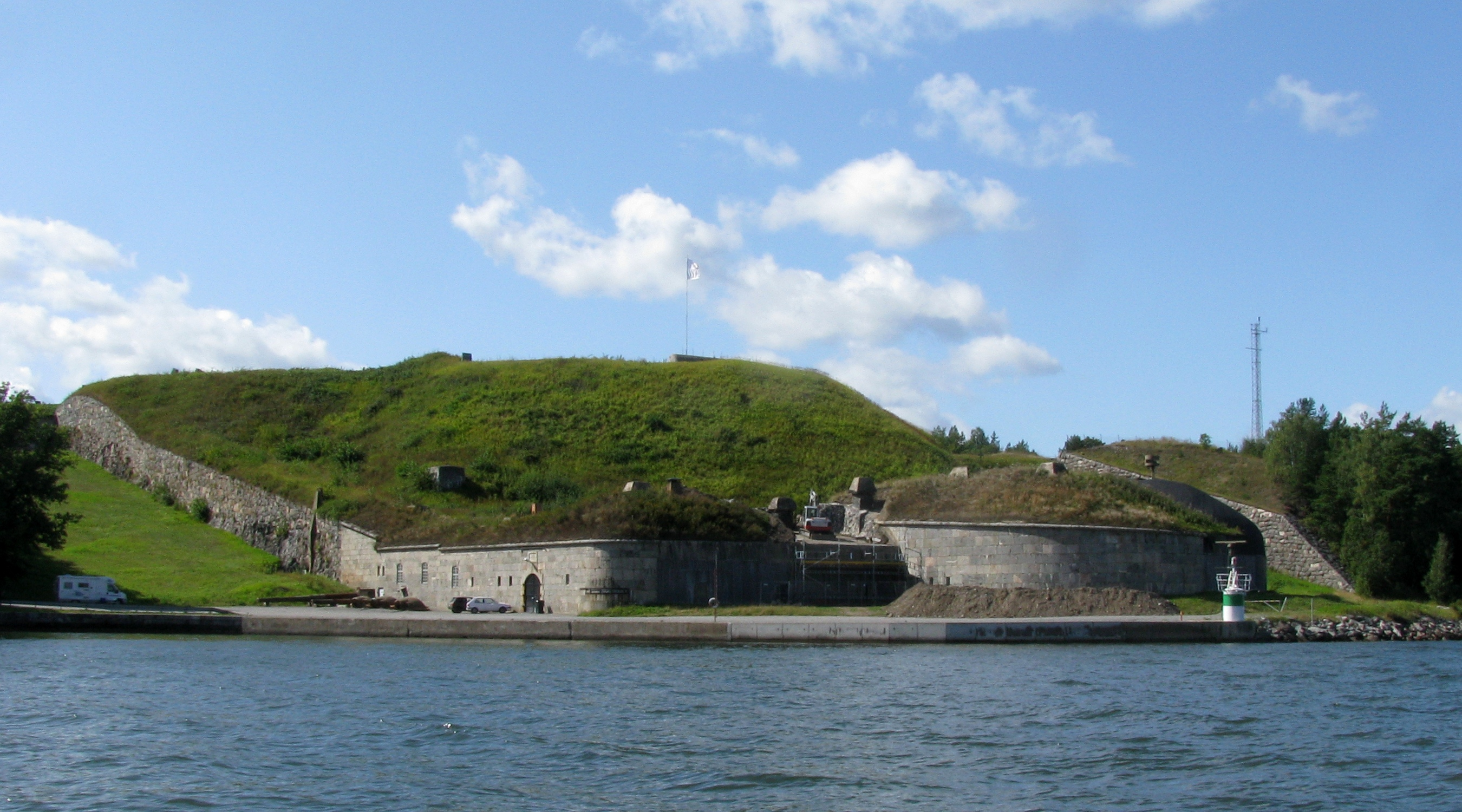

- Location within Stockholm Location within Sweden
- Coordinates: 59°24′N 18°26′E
- Country: Sweden
- Province: Uppland
- County: Stockholm County
- Municipality: Vaxholm Municipality

Area
  - Total: 1.86 km^{2} (0.72 sq mi)

Population (31 December 2020)
  - Total: 1,347
  - Density: 724/km^{2} (1,880/sq mi)
- Time zone: UTC+1 (CET)
  - Summer (DST): UTC+2 (CEST)

Rindö is an urban area situated on the island of Rindö in Vaxholm Municipality, Stockholm County, Sweden. Until 2015 it was known as Oskar-Fredriksborg, a name it took from the nearby Oskar-Fredriksborg Fortress.

In 2020, the urban area had an area of 186 hectares (460 acres) and a population of 1,390.
