= Skarpö =

Island in the Stockholm archipelago and Vaxholm municipality, Sweden

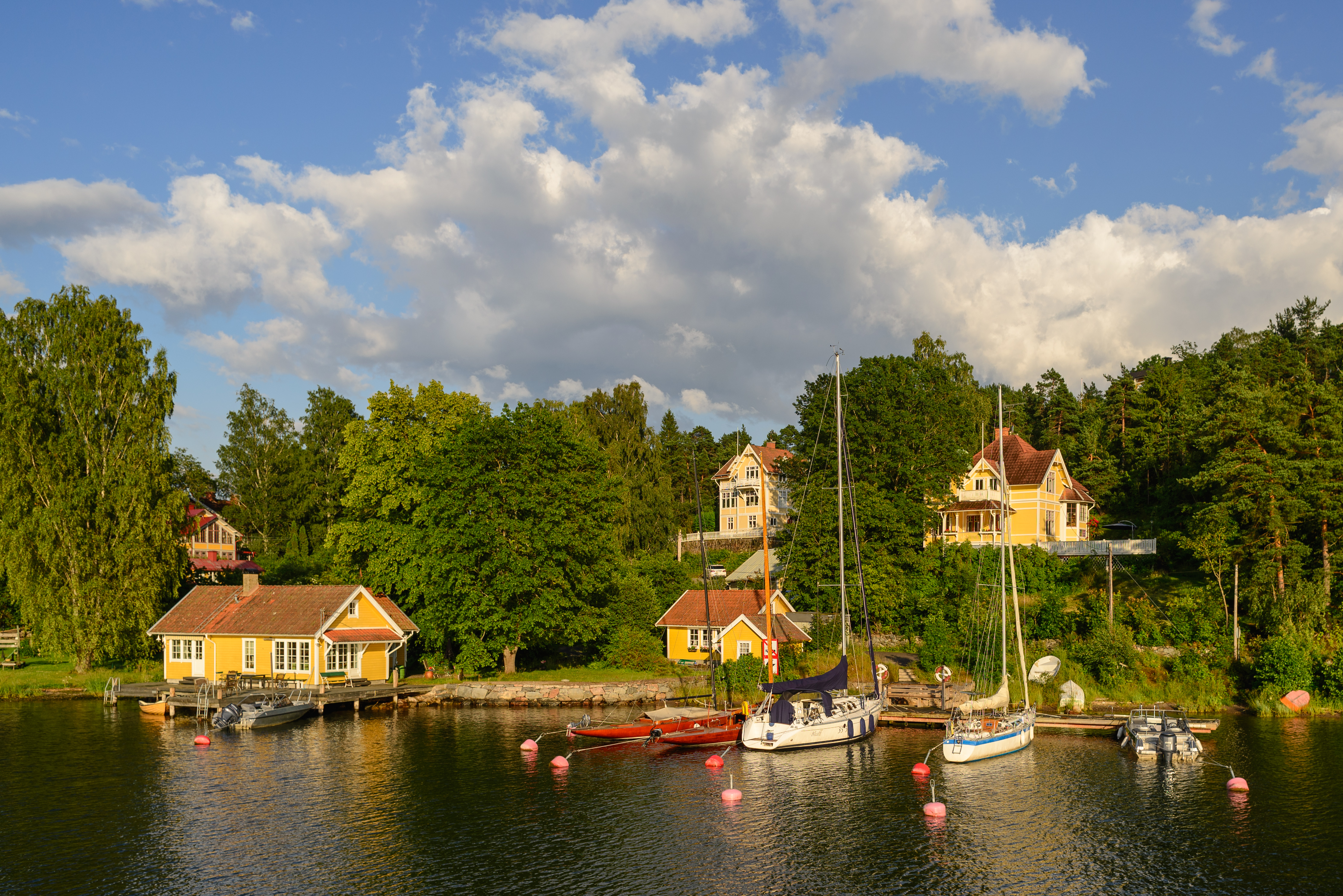
- Buildings at Skarpöborg

- Location within Stockholm Location within Sweden Location within European Union
- Coordinates: 59°24′39″N 18°23′23″E
- Country: Sweden
- Province: Uppland
- County: Stockholm County
- Municipality: Vaxholm Municipality
- Time zone: UTC+1 (CET)
  - Summer (DST): UTC+2 (CEST)

Skarpö is an island in the Stockholm archipelago in Sweden. It is situated in Vaxholm Municipality and Stockholm County. The southern and western half of the island comprises the Skarpö urban area.

A road bridge and local road connects Skarpö to county road 274 on the adjoining island of Rindö to the south. Rindö is in turn connected to Vaxholm town by the Vaxholmsleden car ferry at its western end, and to Värmdö island by the Oxdjupsleden car ferry at its eastern end.

To the west, Skarpö is separated from the island of Stegesund by the very narrow Stegesundet strait, which is used by Waxholmsbolaget ships, and other local ferries, that serve the outer archipelago. Some of these call at Skarpöborg pier on the Skarpö shore of the Stegesundet strait, providing a connection to Vaxholm town and Stockholm city.

== Gallery ==
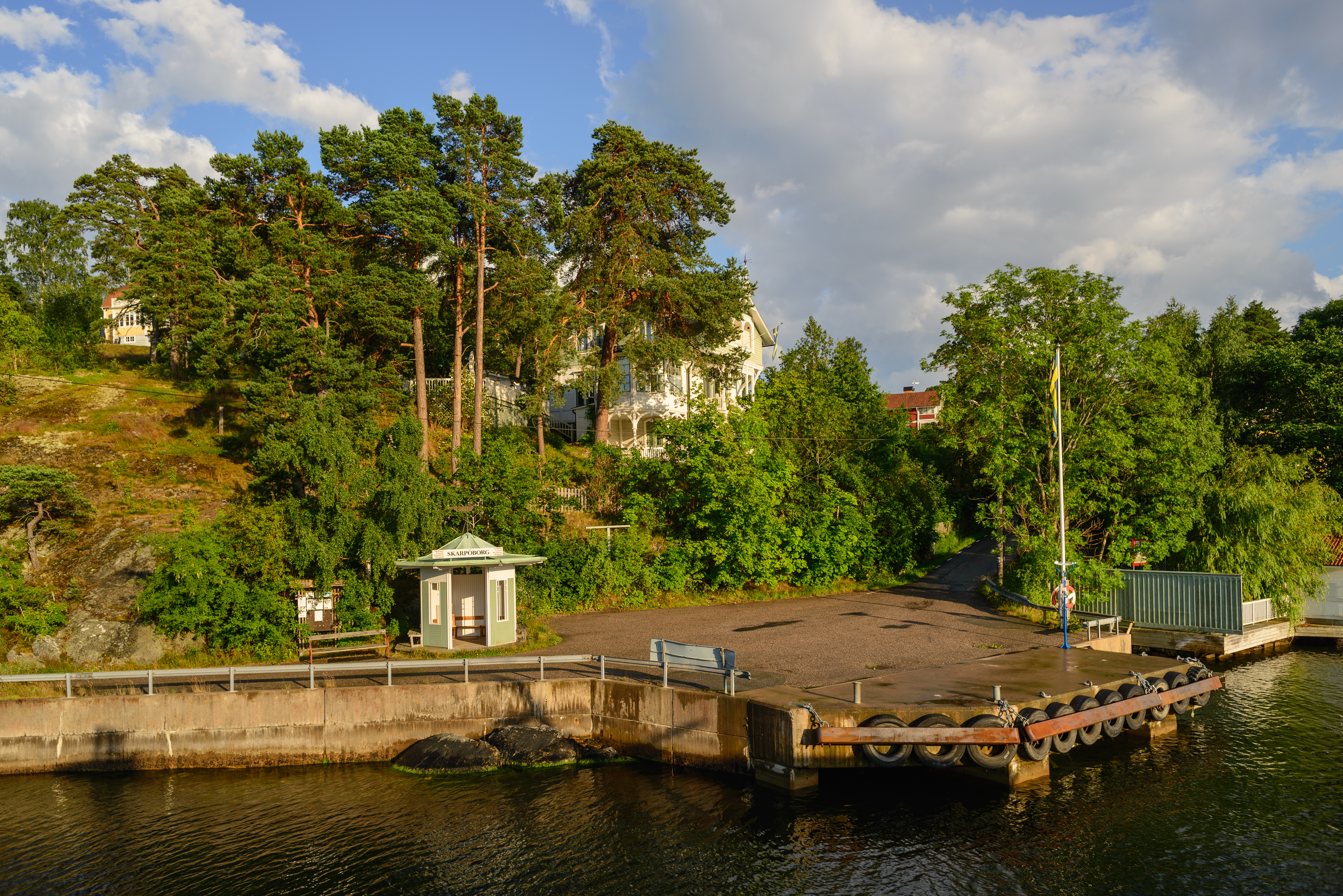
Skarpöborg pier

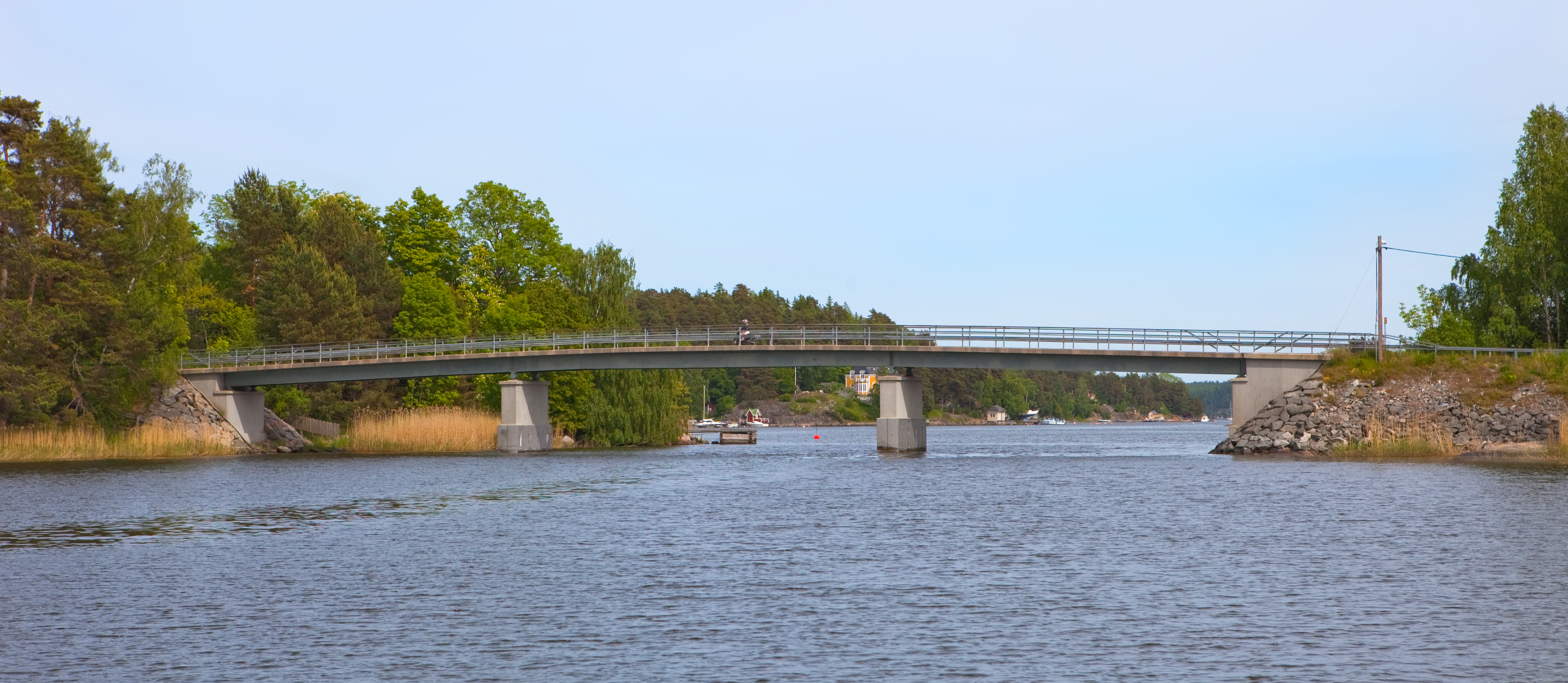
Bridge between Rindö and Skarpö

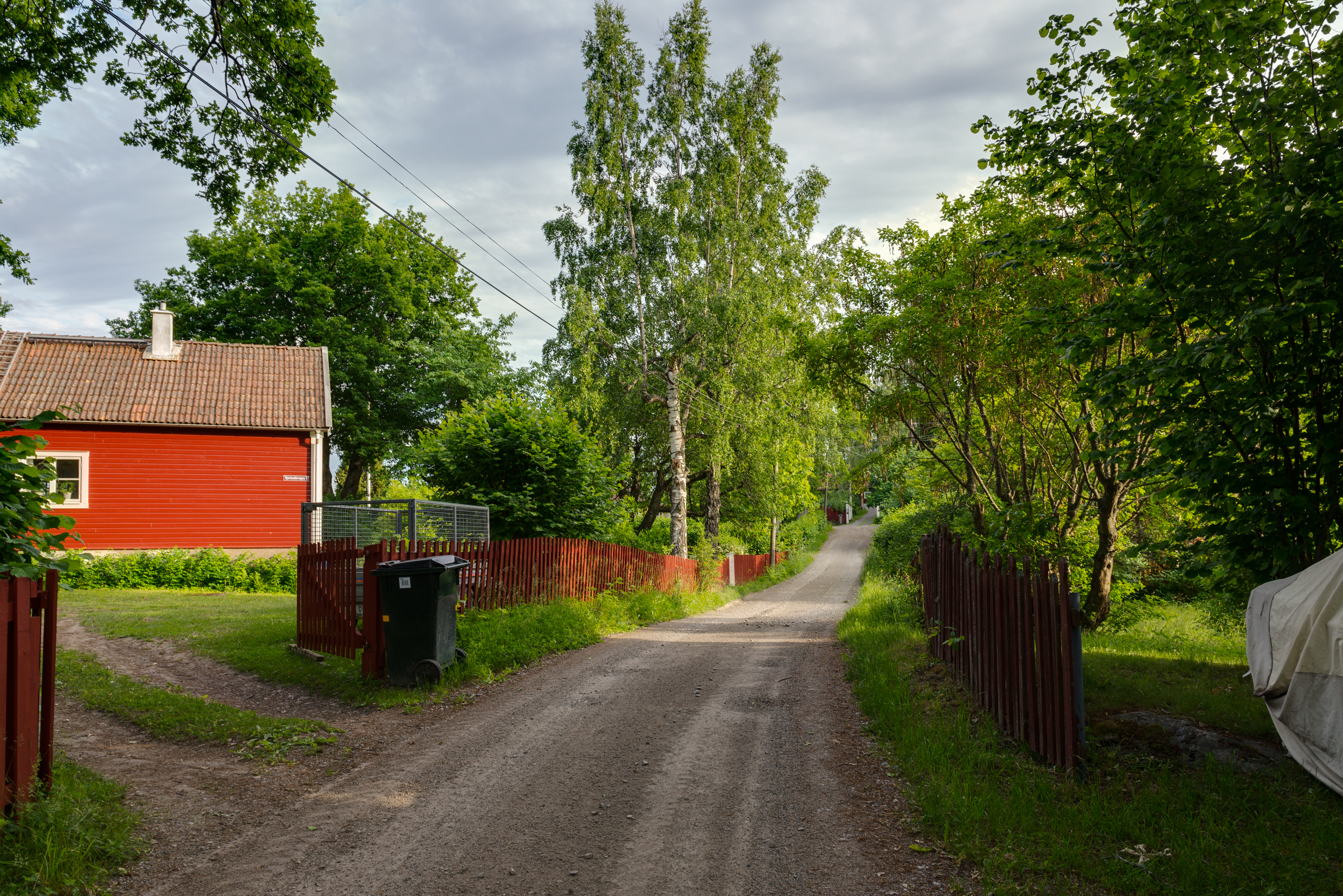
Road on Skarpö
