= Skarpö (locality) =

Urban area on Skarpö island in Vaxholm Municipality, Sweden

- Location within Stockholm Location within Sweden
- Coordinates: 59°24′33″N 18°22′59″E
- Country: Sweden
- Province: Uppland
- County: Stockholm County
- Municipality: Vaxholm Municipality

Area
  - Total: 1.03 km^{2} (0.40 sq mi)

Population (31 December 2020)
  - Total: 257
  - Density: 250/km^{2} (646/sq mi)
- Time zone: UTC+1 (CET)
  - Summer (DST): UTC+2 (CEST)

Skarpö is an urban area comprising the southern and western half of the island of Skarpö in Vaxholm Municipality, Stockholm County, Sweden.

In 2020, the urban area had an area of 103 hectares (250 acres) and a population of 257.
