= Kullö =

Island in the Stockholm archipelago and Vaxholm municipality, Sweden

- Location within Stockholm Location within Sweden Location within European Union
- Coordinates: 59°25′N 18°19′E
- Country: Sweden
- Province: Uppland
- County: Stockholm County
- Municipality: Vaxholm Municipality

Area
  - Total: 0.28 km^{2} (0.11 sq mi)

Population (31 December 2010)
  - Total: 889
  - Density: 3,219/km^{2} (8,340/sq mi)
- Time zone: UTC+1 (CET)
  - Summer (DST): UTC+2 (CEST)

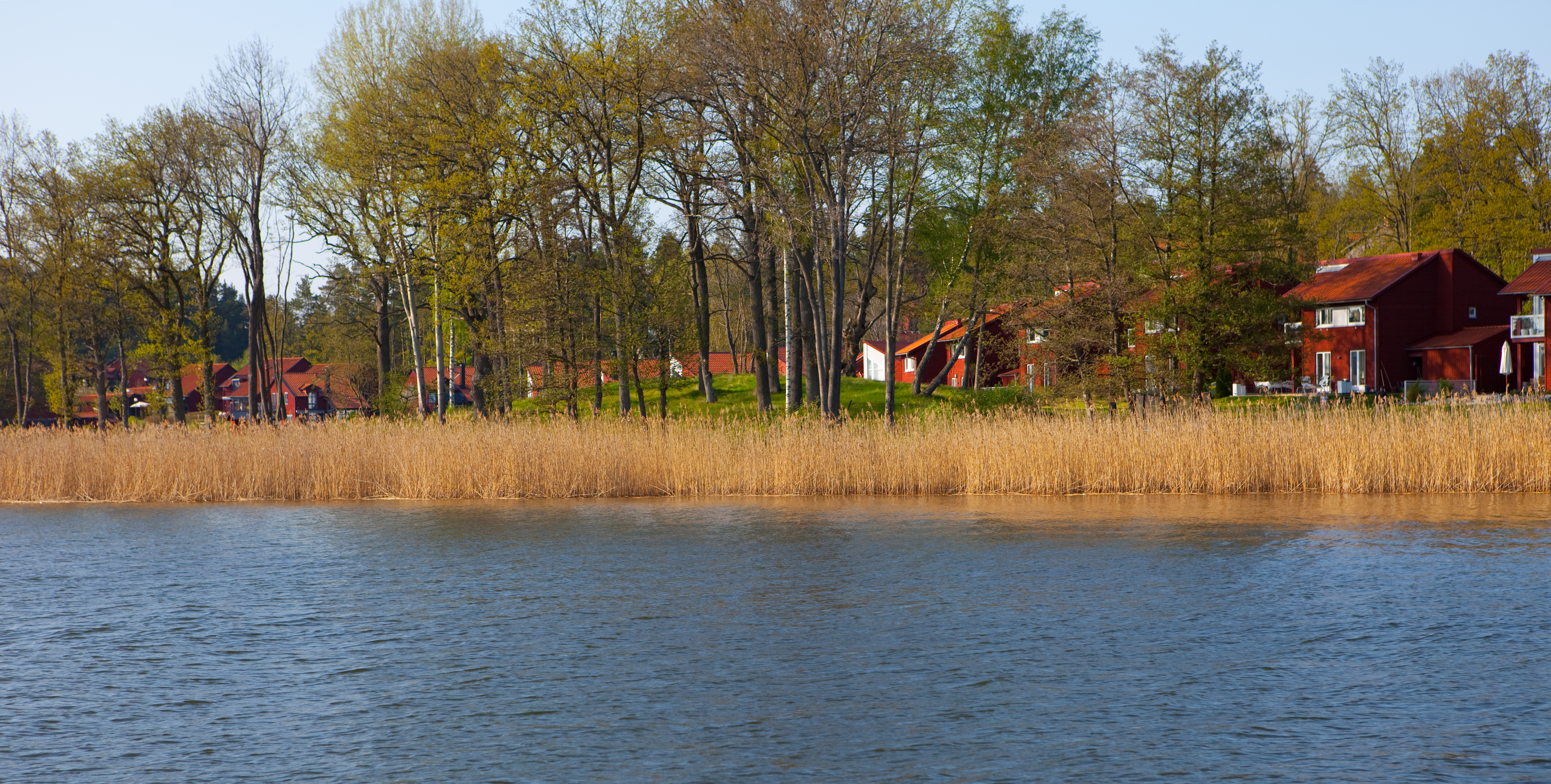
View of Kullön from the water

Kullö is an island in the Stockholm archipelago in Sweden. It is situated in Vaxholm Municipality and Stockholm County.

In 2010, Kullö was also considered an urban area or locality, as defined by Statistics Sweden, and at that time had 889 inhabitants. In 2020 it was redefined as part of the Vaxholm urban area, and more recent population figures are no longer available.

Since 1965 the island has been crossed by county road 274, with a bridge to the south linking it to the island of Vaxön and the rest of the Vaxholm urban area. At the other end of the island, a bridge links to the island of Resarö and, via that, to the mainland.

Large portions of the island comprise the Kullö Naturreservat, which translates directly to Kullö Nature Reserve. The Kullö Nature Reserve's purpose is to preserve the traditional landscape of the island as well as offering visitors to immerse themselves into the typical swedish island landscape.

The island has one bus stop, called Kullö, which is trafficked by several bus routes including route 670, which is the main communal link between the municipal of Vaxholm and the city of Stockholm.
