= Vaxholm Fortress =

1544 Swedish fortress

Coordinates: 59°24′11″N 18°21′35″E

Vaxholm Fortress (Swedish: Vaxholms fästning), also known as Vaxholm Castle, is a historic fortification on the island of Vaxholmen in the Stockholm archipelago just east of the Swedish town of Vaxholm. It is home to the Vaxholm Fortress Museum. The fortress is accessed by the Kastellet ferry, an electrically powered cable ferry across the channel from Vaxholm town.

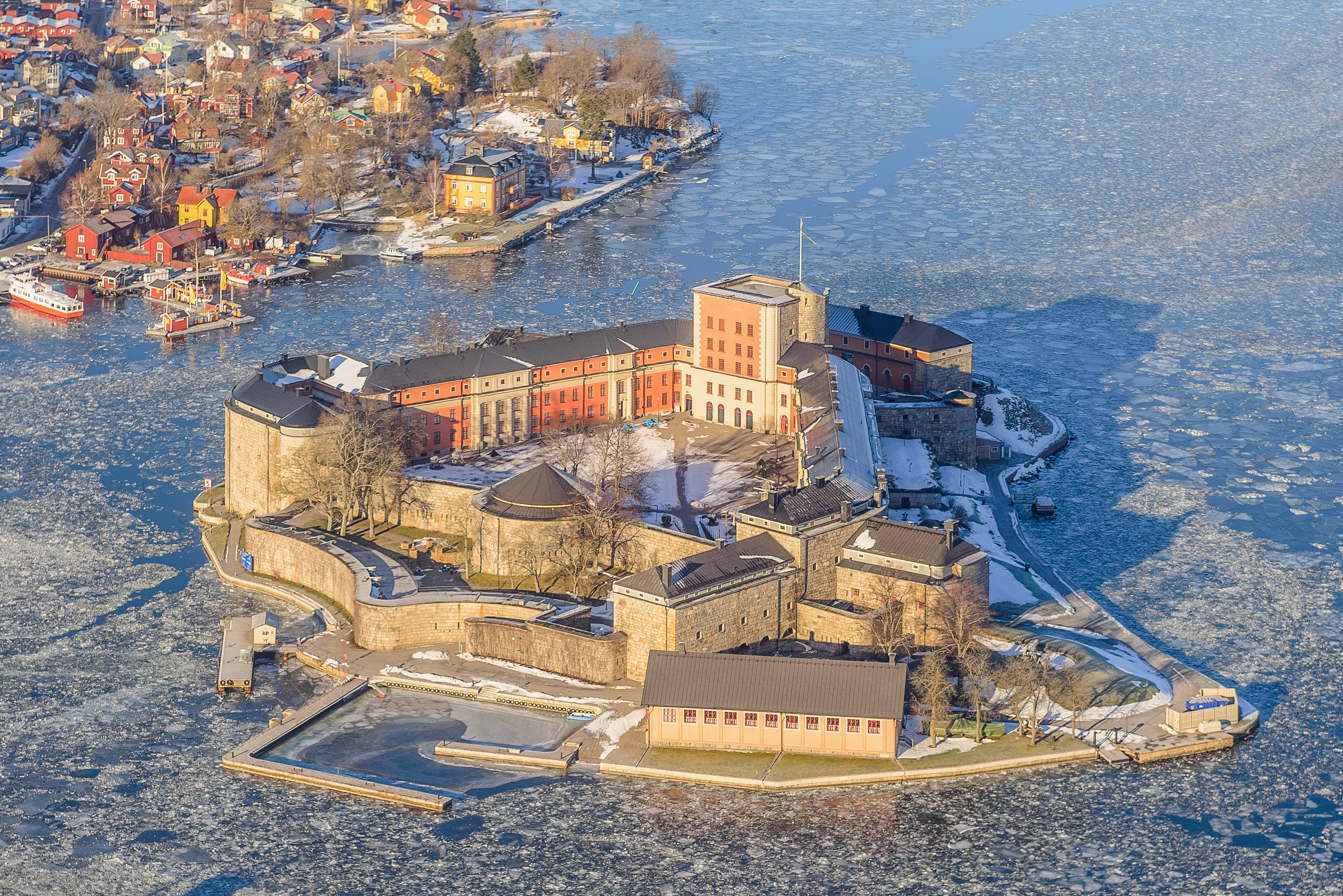
Aerial view of the fortress, with Vaxholm town behind

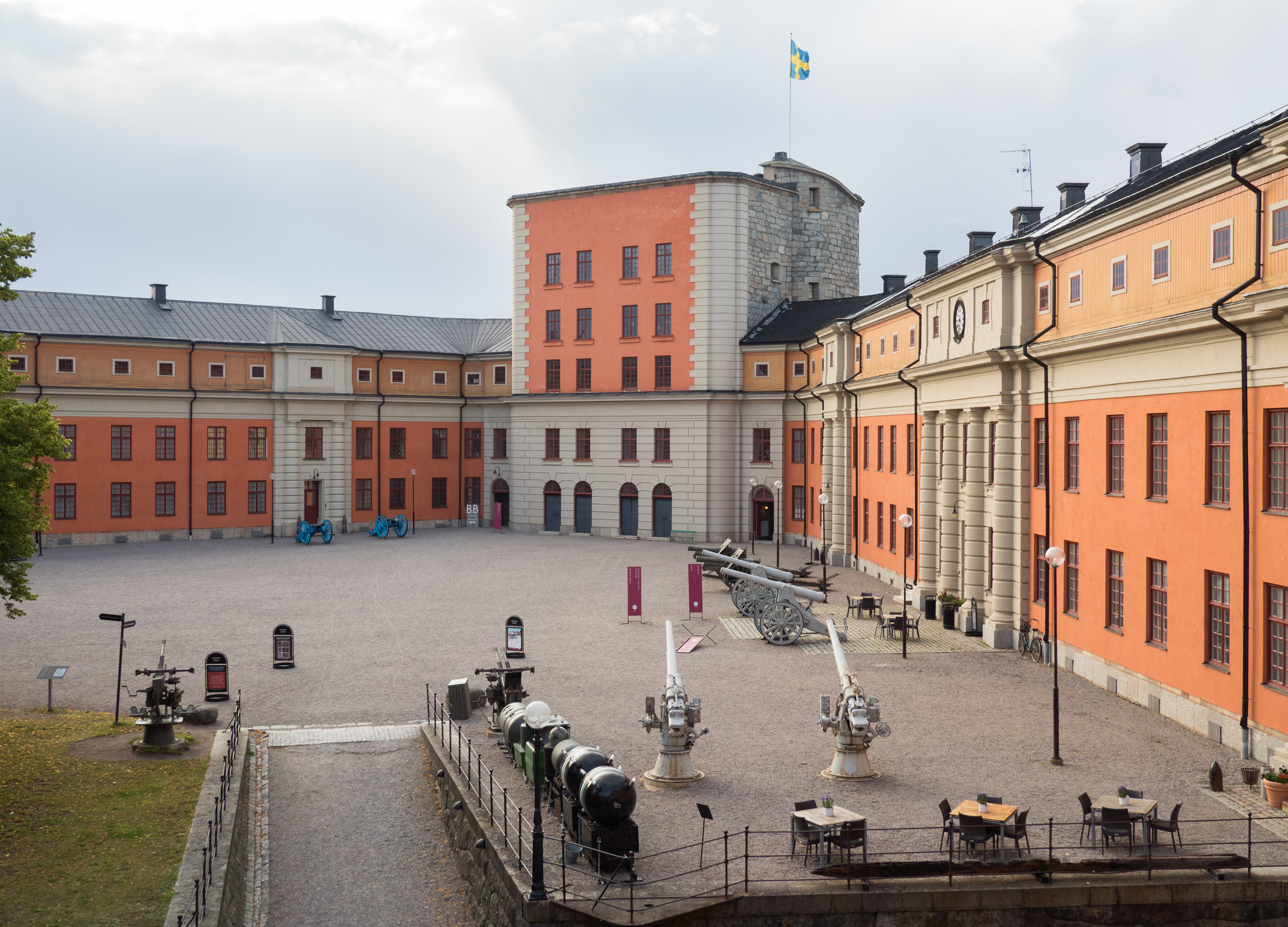
Interior of the fortress

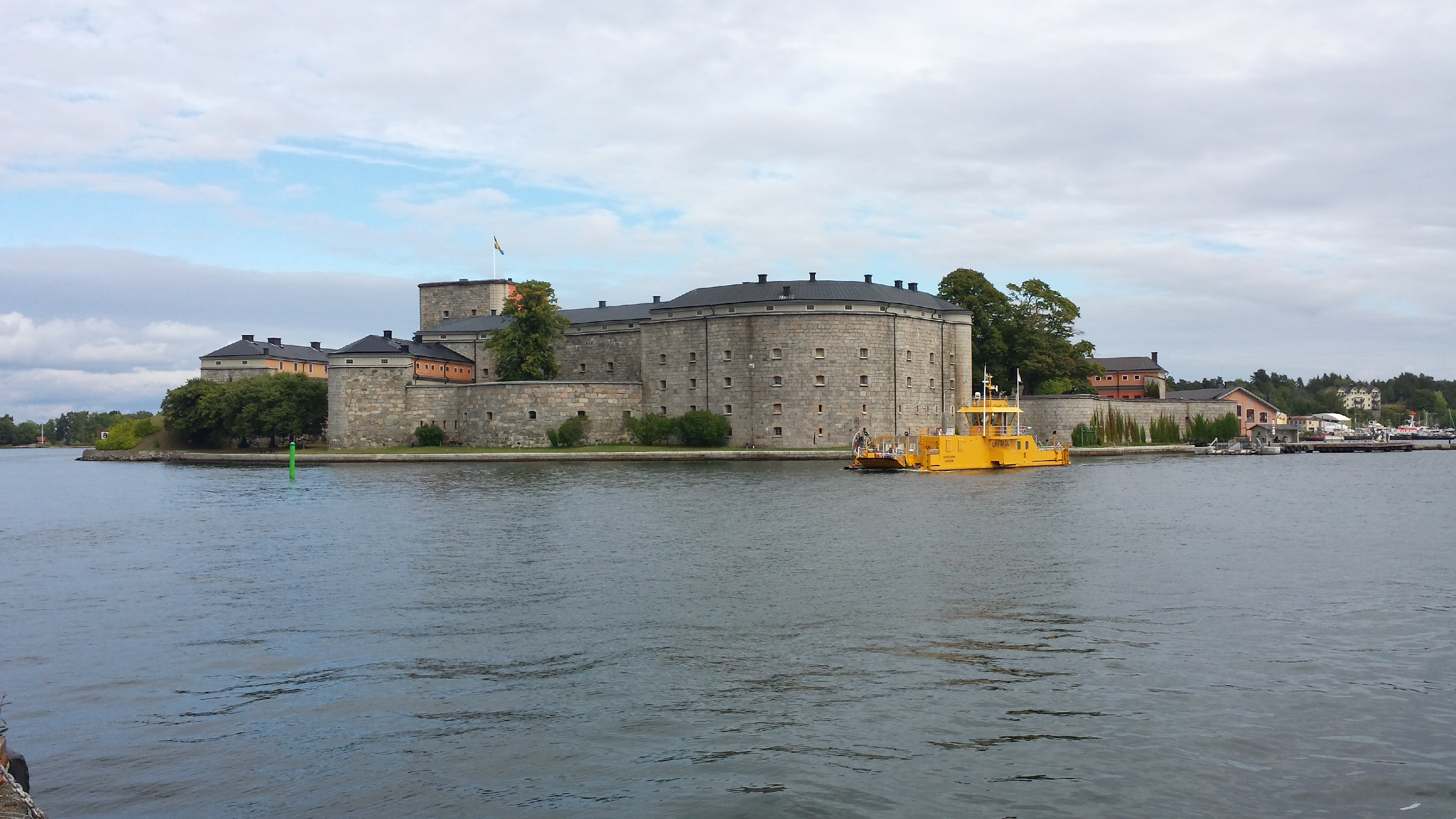
The fortress, seen from Vaxholm town, with the Kastellet ferry mid-channel

In 1970, the fortress was used as a movie location for the pirate stronghold in Pippi in the South Seas. A scenic view of the fortress may be seen from the car ferry, which plies the short distance between Vaxholm and the island of Rindö.

== History ==
The fortress was originally constructed by Gustav Vasa in 1548 to defend Stockholm against shipborne attacks from the east. The islet of Vaxholmen, which is entirely covered by the fortress, lies in the Kodjupet strait, which was one of two main routes into Stockholm from the open sea. At the same time, the alternative Oxdjupet strait, on the far side of Rindö island, was artificially reduced in depth to prevent its use. Thus, the fortress was strategically situated to defend the city from naval attacks.

Gustav I's wooden blockhouse was replaced by a stone tower during Johan III's reign (1569 to 1592). This fortress was attacked by the Danes in 1612 and by the Russian navy in 1719, with both attacks being repulsed. Most of the current structure dates from 1833–1863. Its design was inspired by the ideas on fortifications propounded by the French engineers Marc René Montalbert and Lazare Carnot. Russian prisoners of war were used in part to build the fortress.

By the latter half of the 19th century, the narrow and twisting Kodjupet strait was proving problematic for the period's larger ships, and in 1879, the main shipping route into Stockholm was diverted to use the Oxdjupet strait, which was dredged to remove its previous artificial obstructions. This reduced the military importance of Vaxholm Fortress. So weak did the fort become that it was said the great Prussian field marshal von Moltke was only ever seen to smile twice – once when they told him his mother-in-law was dead and again when he saw Vaxholm Fort.

The Vaxholm Fortress Museum moved to the fortress in 1964, having been created in 1947 at the Oskar-Fredriksborg Fortress on the Oxdjupet strait.

The fortress is today one of Vaxholm's most popular tourist attractions and has grown to be symbolic for the small town. Vaxholm fortress can today be reached easily since the ferries of the Vaxholmsbolaget commenced trafficking the island of Vaxholmen in summer 2025.
