= Tynningö =

- Location within Stockholm Location within Sweden Location within European Union
- Country: Sweden
- Province: Uppland
- County: Stockholm County
- Municipality: Vaxholm Municipality

Area
  - Total: 4.63 km^{2} (1.79 sq mi)

Population (31 December 2020)
  - Total: 363
  - Density: 78.4/km^{2} (203/sq mi)
- Time zone: UTC+1 (CET)
  - Summer (DST): UTC+2 (CEST)

Tynningö is an island in the central area of Sweden's Stockholm Archipelago. From an administrative perspective, it is located in Vaxholm Municipality and Stockholm County. As of 2015, the island has 380 permanent inhabitants, although this population increases significantly in summer.

Tynningö is linked to the city of Stockholm and the town of Vaxholm by passenger ferries of the Waxholmbolaget, which serve a number of jetties on the island, including Höganäs, Norra Tynningö, Orrlunda and Norehill. It is also linked to Norra Lagnö on the island of Värmdö by the Tynningöleden vehicle ferry route, operated by Trafikverket, which gives road access via the Skurubron bridge to the mainland. Storstockholms Lokaltrafik operates bus route 689 that provides service on the island and links to the Tynningöleden and the Waxholmbolaget ships at Höganäs and Norra Tynningö.
