= Vaxön =

Island in the Stockholm archipelago and Vaxholm municipality, Sweden

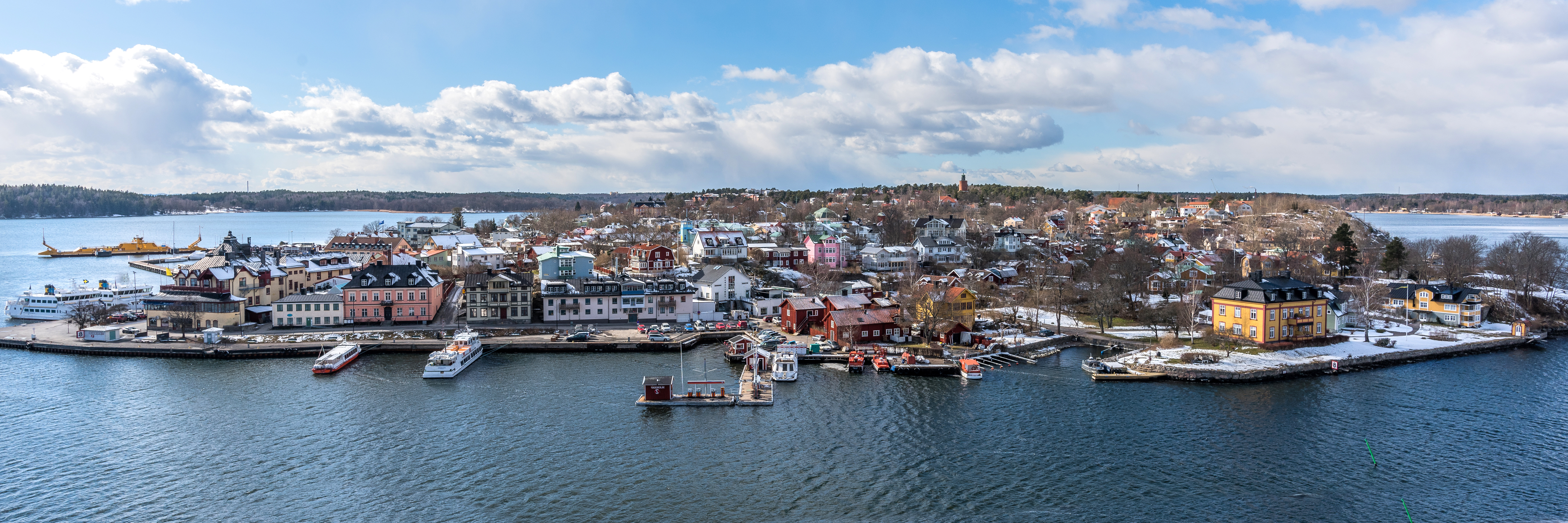

- Location within Stockholm Location within Sweden Location within European Union
- Coordinates: 59°24′15″N 18°19′53″E
- Country: Sweden
- Province: Uppland
- County: Stockholm County
- Municipality: Vaxholm Municipality
- Time zone: UTC+1 (CET)
  - Summer (DST): UTC+2 (CEST)

Vaxön is an island in the Stockholm archipelago in Sweden. It is situated in Vaxholm Municipality and Stockholm County. Until 2020, the urban area of Vaxholm, as defined by Statistics Sweden, was entirely contained within the island of Vaxön. However in that year, the adjacent island of Kullö was redefined as part of the urban area.

Vaxön is linked to the Swedish mainland by a series of road bridges, and the Vaxholmsleden car ferry connects Vaxön to the island of Rindö across the Kodjupet strait. A bus service connects the island to Stockholm city, whilst the Waxholmsbolaget and other ferry lines also provide boat services to central Stockholm and many of the other islands of the Stockholm archipelago, using a mixture of classic steamers and modern fast passenger ferries.
