= Rindö =

Island in the Stockholm Archipelago, Uppland, Sweden

- Location within Stockholm Location within Sweden Location within European Union
- Country: Sweden
- Province: Uppland
- County: Stockholm County
- Municipality: Vaxholm Municipality

Area
  - Total: 4.46 km^{2} (1.72 sq mi)
- Time zone: UTC+1 (CET)
  - Summer (DST): UTC+2 (CEST)

Rindö is an island in the central area of Sweden's Stockholm Archipelago, some 21 kilometres (13 mi) north-east of the city of Stockholm. From an administrative perspective, it is located in Vaxholm Municipality and Stockholm County. The island is about 5 kilometres (3.1 mi) long and 1.2 kilometres (0.75 mi) wide and has an area of 4.46 square kilometres (1.72 sq mi). There are two localities on the island, Rindö (formerly known as Oskar-Fredriksborg) and Rindöby.

The island is connected to Vaxholm town by the Vaxholmsleden car ferry at its western end, and to Värmdö island by the Oxdjupsleden car ferry at its eastern end. County road 274 connects the two, as does Storstockholms Lokaltrafik bus route 688, with some buses crossing on the ferry to Vaxholm. There is a bridge connection to the smaller adjacent Skarpö island.

Situated between the two main shipping routes from the open sea into Stockholm, the Kodjupet strait to the west and the Oxdjupet strait to the east, Rindö has long been an important defensive site. Whilst the Kodjupet strait was principally protected by the Vaxholm Fortress built on an islet within the channel, it was also defended by the Rindö redount on Rindö. At the other end of the island, the Byviksfortet and the Oskar-Fredriksborg Fortress protected the Oxdjupet strait.
