= Resarö =

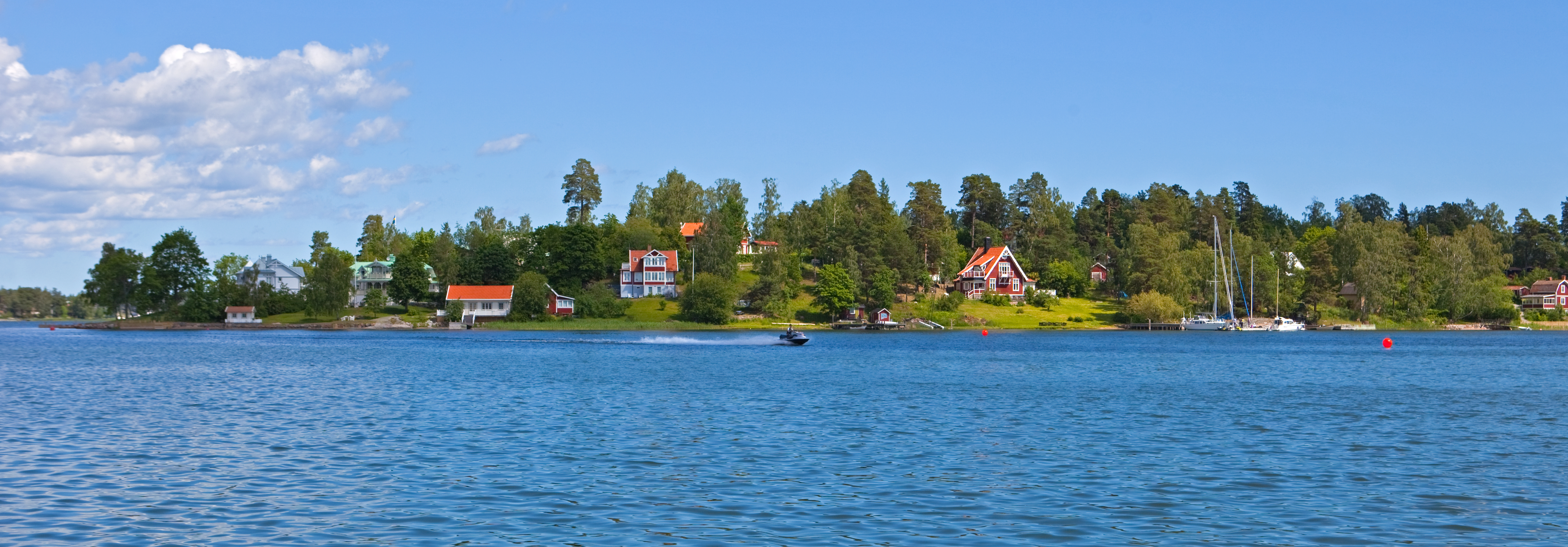
- Resarö waterfront

- Location within Stockholm Location within Sweden Location within European Union
- Coordinates: 59°26′N 18°20′E
- Country: Sweden
- Province: Uppland
- County: Stockholm County
- Municipality: Vaxholm Municipality

Area
  - Total: 3.50 km^{2} (1.35 sq mi)

Population (31 December 2020)
  - Total: 3,212
  - Density: 951/km^{2} (2,460/sq mi)
- Time zone: UTC+1 (CET)
  - Summer (DST): UTC+2 (CEST)

Resarö is an island in the Stockholm archipelago and a locality in Vaxholm Municipality, Stockholm County, Sweden. The island is divided into four populated areas: Överby, Ytterby, Storäng, Engarn and Ladvik, of which Ytterby notably is the most famous one because of its local mine. It had 3,212 inhabitants in 2020. Resarö includes the hamlet of Ytterby, famous for the discovery of several rare-earth elements in a local mine.

At its southern end, the island is crossed by county road 274, with a bridge to the south linking it to the island of Kullö and, via that, to the Vaxholm urban area. To the west, a bridge links to the mainland via the islet of Bullerholmen. Local roads connect the county road with centres of population to the north of the island. Except for the winter months, passenger ships of the Waxholmsbolaget call at a pier in Ytterby, providing a connection to Vaxholm town and Stockholm city.

== The name ==
The old form of the name was Risarna. The first element is ris 'brushwood' - the last element is derived from arin 'gravel; island made by gravel'. The last element ö 'island' was added in the 16th century.
