= Vaxholm =

City and urban area in Vaxholm Municipality, Sweden

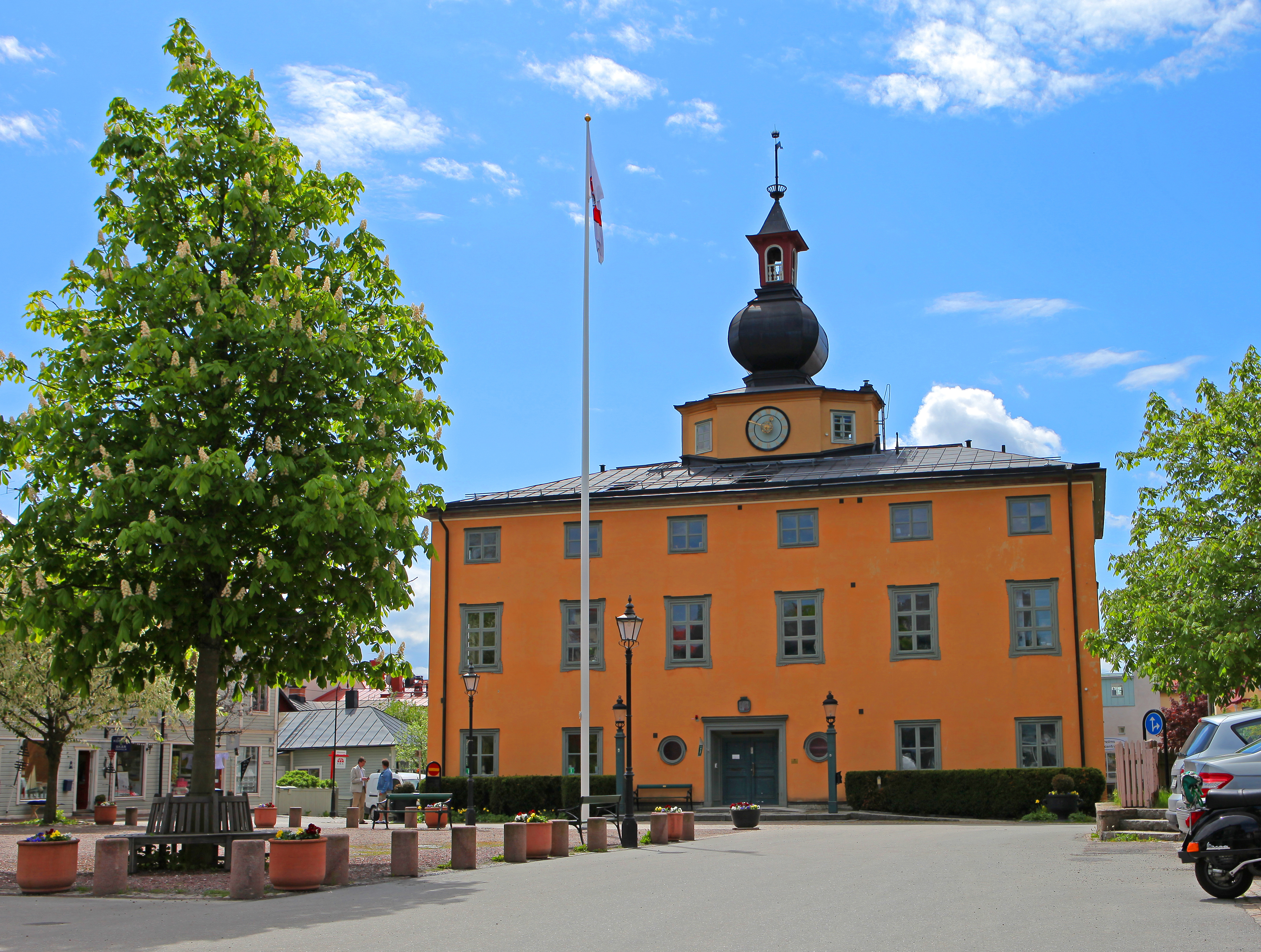
- Vaxholm Town Hall

- Location within Stockholm Location within Sweden Location within European Union
- Coordinates: 59°24′11″N 18°19′35″E
- Country: Sweden
- Province: Uppland
- County: Stockholm County
- Municipality: Vaxholm Municipality

Area
  - Total: 2.29 km^{2} (0.88 sq mi)

Population (31 December 2020)
  - Total: 6,151
- Demonyms: Vaxholmer; Vaxholmite; Vaxholmian; Waxholmer; Waxholmite; Waxholmian
- Time zone: UTC+1 (CET)
  - Summer (DST): UTC+2 (CEST)

Vaxholm is a city, urban area and the seat of Vaxholm Municipality, Stockholm County, Sweden. It occupies bigger amount of islands of which the most populated are Vaxön, Resarö, Rindö and Kullö which is known for its nature reserve. The name Vaxholm comes from Vaxholm Fortress, which was constructed in 1549 on the adjacent islet of Vaxholmen.

For historical reasons it has always been referred to as a city, despite the small number of inhabitants, which as of 2020 total was 6,151. Vaxholm Municipality prefers to use the designation Vaxholms stad (City of Vaxholm) for its whole territory, including 64 islets in the Stockholm archipelago, a usage which is somewhat confusing.

== History ==
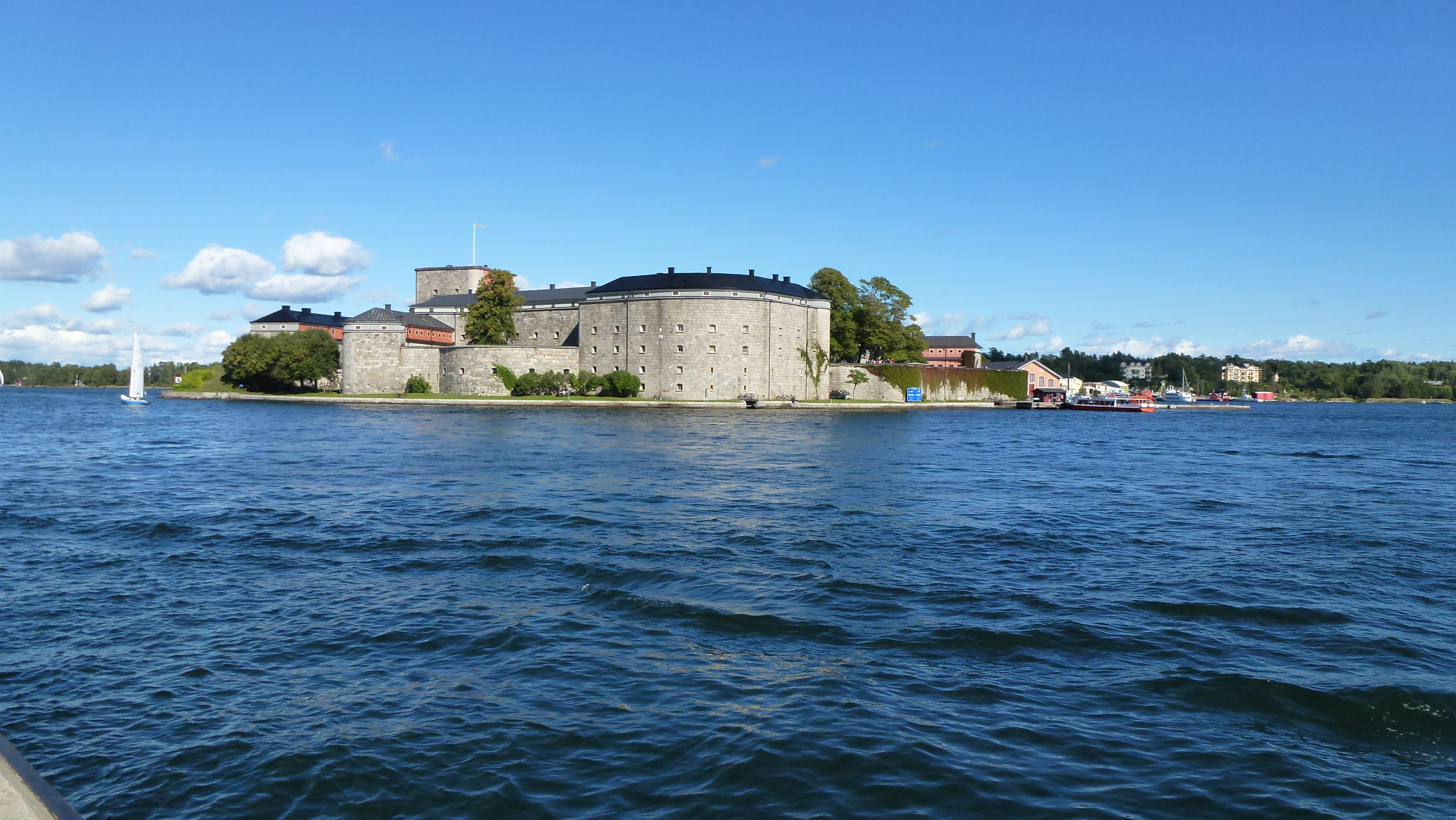
Vaxholm Fortress

Vaxholm Fortress was originally constructed by Gustav Vasa in 1548 to defend Stockholm against shipborne attacks from the east. The fortress lies in the middle of the Kodjupet strait, one of two main routes into Stockholm from the open sea.

The town of Vaxholm, which lies adjacent to the fortress but on the western side of the Kodjupet strait, was established in 1558, when King Gustav Vasa bought some farms from Count Per Brahe the Elder. It later received rights as a merchant town (köping) and in 1652 was granted the Royal Charter. The designated coat of arms reminds of the fortifications as well as shipping industry.

In 1849, the Djurgårdens Ångbåts-Aktie-Bolag introduced a steamboat service from Stockholm to Vaxholm. Through a number of acquisitions and mergers, this company became that known today as Waxholmsbolaget. As a consequence and in the 1860s, Vaxholm became a popular resort town, especially for bathers, and many wooden summer houses were built by people from Stockholm.

It was not until 1912 that houses were allowed to be built from materials other than wood, giving the town a distinctive appearance. In 1926 the town got its first fixed land connection via the single-lane Pålsundsbron bridge that links to the Bogesundslandet peninsular to the south of the town. This was followed in 1965 by the wider Vaxholmsbron bridge that links to the island of Kullö to the north-west of the town, carrying county road 274 on its way to the mainland.

Until 2020, the urban area of Vaxholm, as defined by Statistics Sweden, was entirely contained within the island of Vaxön. However in that year, the urban area was redefined to include the adjacent island of Kullö.

== Transportation ==
Vaxholm is situated on an island, but is linked to the Swedish mainland by a series of road bridges, and a bus service connects the town to Stockholm city. The Waxholmsbolaget and other ferry lines also provide boat services to central Stockholm and many of the other islands of the Stockholm archipelago, using a mixture of classic steamers and modern fast passenger ferries.

The Vaxholmsleden car ferry connects Vaxholm to the island of Rindö across the Kodjupet strait. The Kastellet ferry, an electrically powered cable ferry provides passenger access to Vaxholm Fortress on its islet in the middle of the Kodjupet.

== Sports ==
The following sports clubs are located in Vaxholm :

- IFK Vaxholm
- Vaxholms IBF
- Vaxholms TK
- IK Waxholm
- Waxholms KK

== Gallery ==
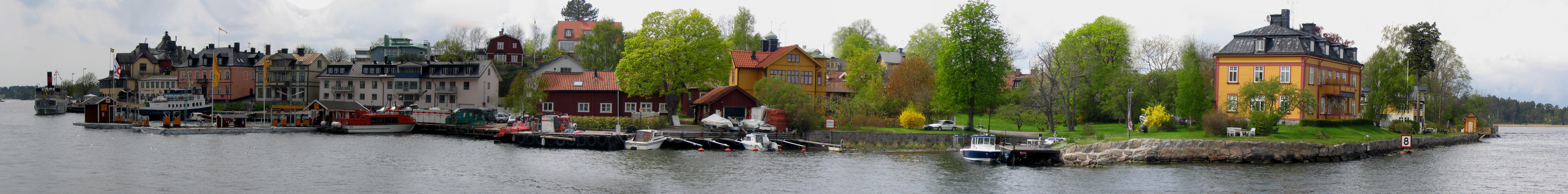
Panorama

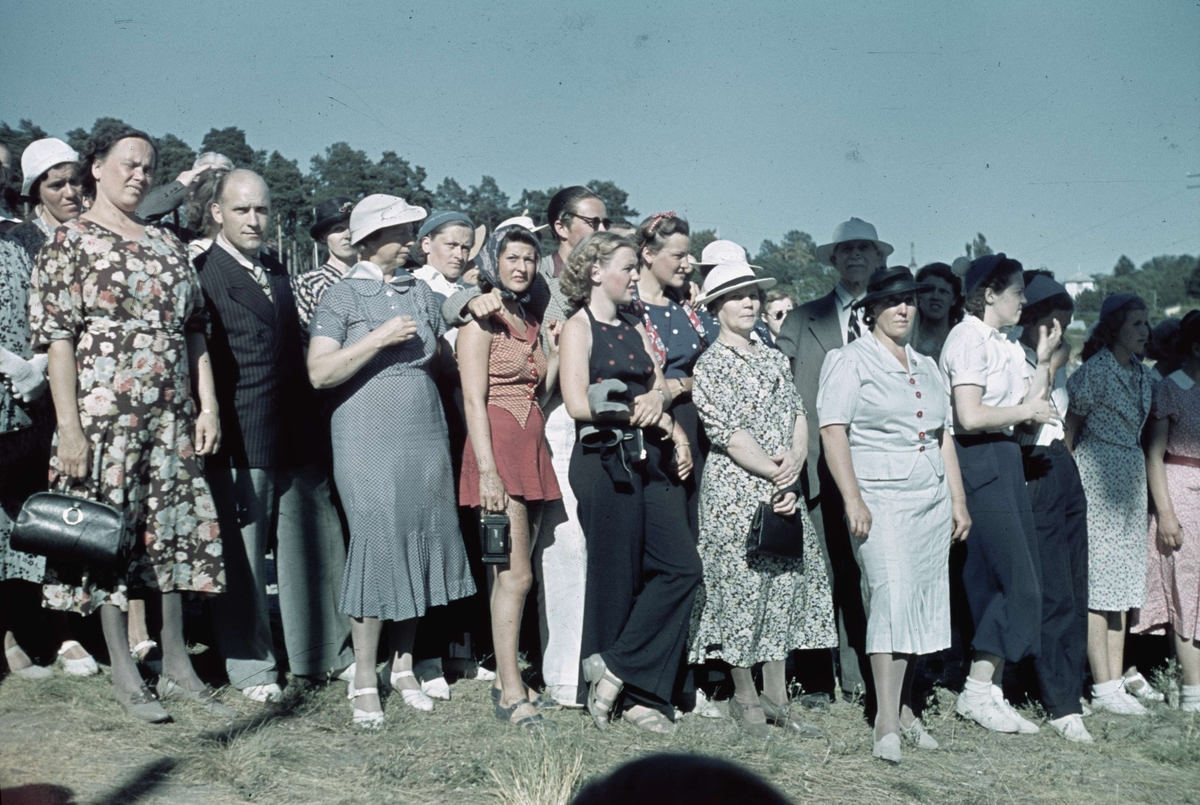
Vaxholm during the world cup competitions in canoe in 1938

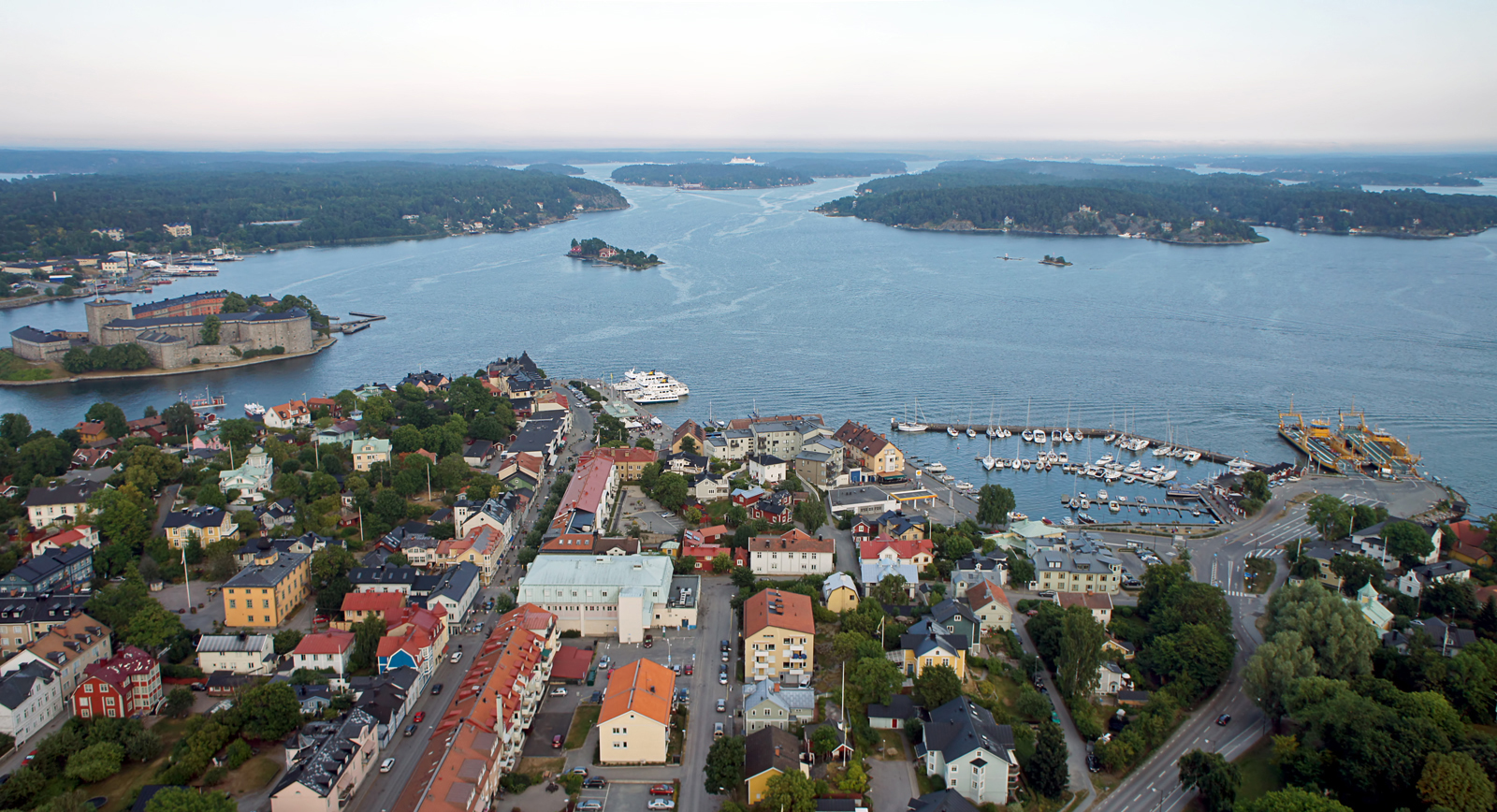
Vaxholm 2013
