= Fortifications of Sweden =

Early fortifications of Sweden were built to defend self-governing provinces, with rapid expansion of forts in the 14th century and again later in the 16th century, when Sweden became independent and needed to protect its borders.

Changes in the position of borders led to fortifications changing owner, to and from Sweden; some became redundant; and a few forts were given major upgrades for improved technology over the centuries.

== List of fortifications ==
12C

- Bulverket
- Visborg
- Vyborg Castle

13C

- Axevalla House
- Falkenberg (fort)
- Walls of Stockholm

14C Hundred Years' War and Black Death

- Old Älvsborg – original
- Bohus Fortress [‡]
- Kastelholm Castle
- Sibbesborg
- Styresholm
- Varberg Fortress - original

15C Unification under one king and expansion of territory with first Union with Norway and Denmark

- Shlisselburg – rebuilt

16C Sweden gains independence and Protestant Reformation, Livonian War, creation of Sweden's first professional army.

- Vaxholm Fortress - original

17C Ingrian War, Kalmar War, Thirty Years' War and Second Northern War saw Swedish territory expand.

- New Älvsborg – rebuilt
- Carlsten [‡]
- Dalarö Fortress
- Fortifications of Gothenburg
- Karlsvärd Fortress
- Kastellet, Stockholm –original
- Nyenschantz
- Skansen Kronan
- Skansen Lejonet
- Varberg Fortress - rebuilt

18C After Swedish defeats in the Great Northern War as well as in the Russo-Swedish War of 1741-1743, there was a need to construct fortifications to guard both the border as well as the coast of Finland.

- Sveaborg (Suomenlinna)
- Svartholm fortress

19C Union with Norway after Norway ceded to Sweden by Denmark

- Fårösund Fortress
- Karlsborg Fortress [‡]
- Vaberget Fortress
- Vaxholm Fortress - rebuilt

20C Dissolution of the union between Norway and Sweden, neutral in First and Second World Wars. Cold War era.

- Boden Fortress [‡]
- Femöre battery
- Järflotta
- Kastellet, Stockholm - rebuilt
- Skåne Line
- Älvsborg Fortress

[‡] Currently in use by the Swedish Military

== See also ==
- Swedish Armed Forces
- Swedish Coastal Artillery
- Swedish Fortifications Agency
- History of Sweden
