= Stockholm's permanent defence =

Fortifications in Stockholm, Sweden

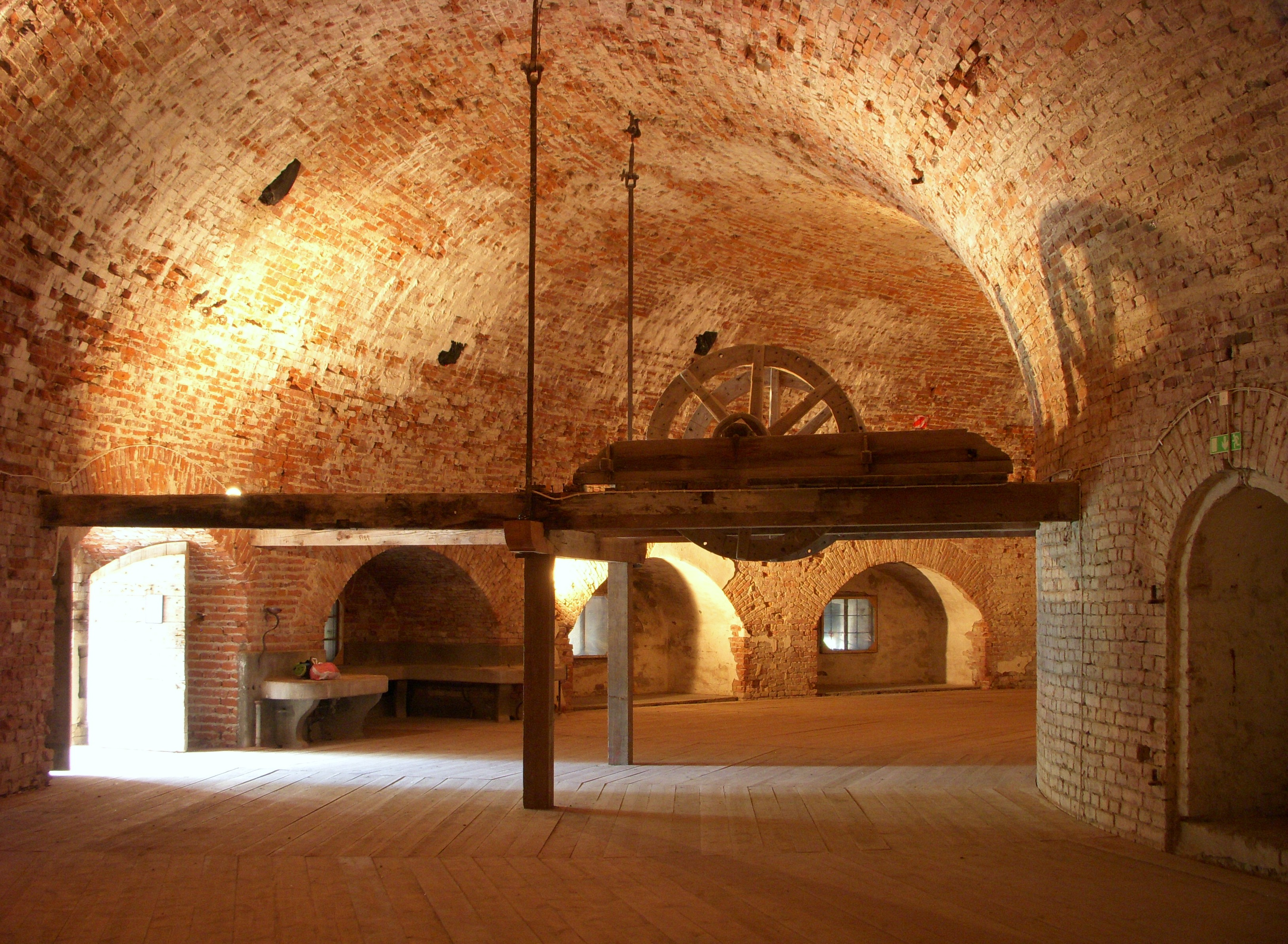
Fredriksborg Fortress' preserved 18th-century interior

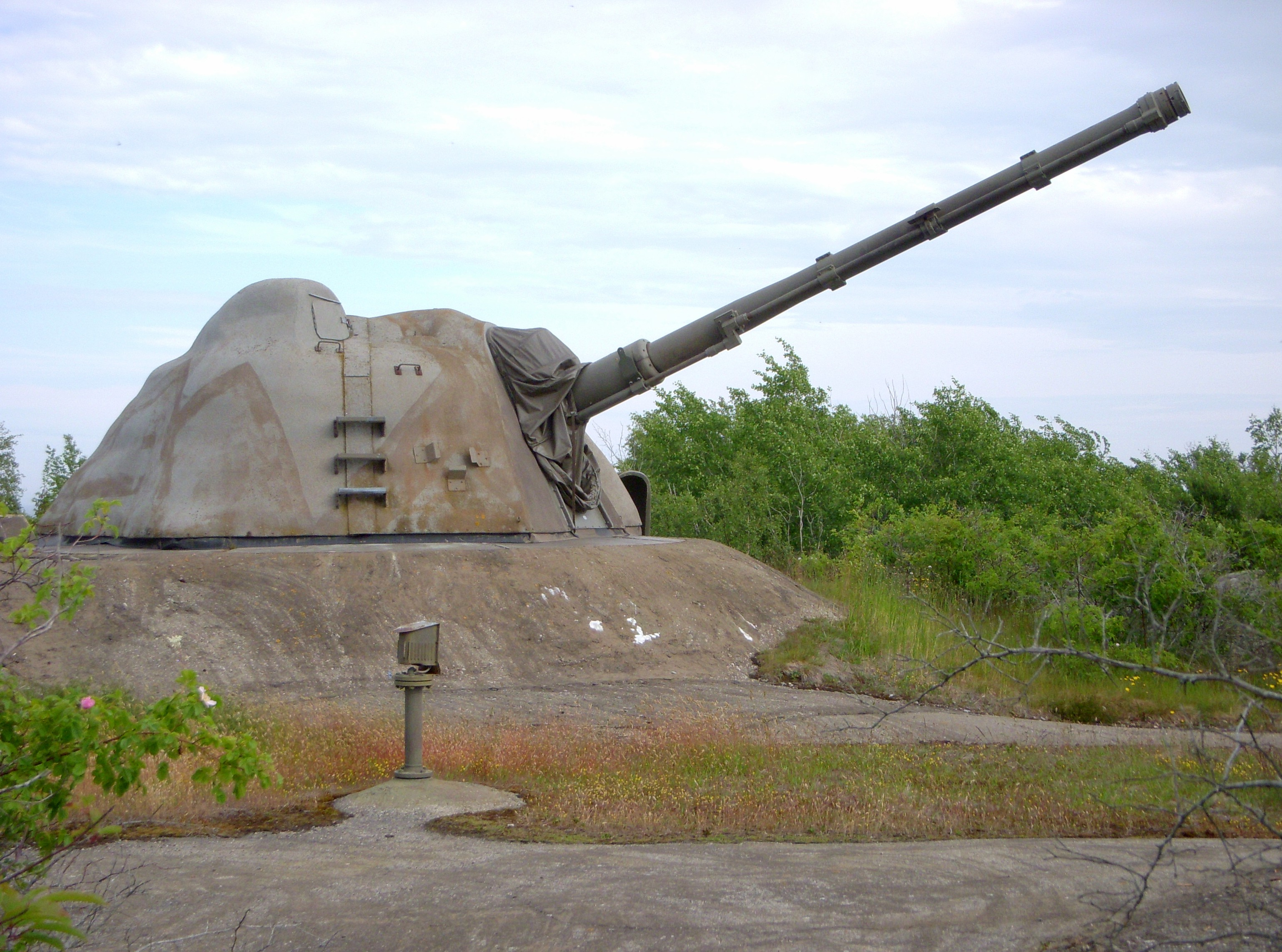
ERSTA Battery's 12 cm turret automatic gun m/70, in use until the year 2000.

Stockholm's permanent defence consisted of fortification structures built in the Stockholm region to defend the city against hostile attacks from sea, land, and air. The oldest installations date back to the 13th century, and the last ones were built as late as the 1970s. In the 16th century, the construction of Vaxholm Fortress began. During the second half of the 17th century, the council of war Erik Dahlbergh was the prominent fortification architect. Many sconces were modernized or newly built along the Swedish Baltic Sea coast during the Russian Pillage of 1719–1721. Throughout the 19th century, the question of Stockholm's protection against attacks, mainly from the east, was debated. Proposals for fortifications in 1808 and 1826 did not yield any concrete results.

Towards the end of the 19th century, a new defence policy emerged, replacing central defence with border and coastal defence. Around the turn of the 20th century, private individuals organized themselves into the Palmqvist Foundation for Stockholm's fortification and the Association for Stockholm's Permanent Defence, donating money to construct fortifications around Stockholm, known as the "Korvlinjen."

Even before the outbreak of World War II, the importance of anti-aircraft defence was recognized, and defence measures in the Stockholm archipelago were strengthened. However, little was initially done for the defence of the capital. It wasn't until 1943 that serious concerns arose, and by 1944, around fifty anti-aircraft positions were established in and around Stockholm.

Stockholm's permanent defence also tells the story of 700 years of war or the threat of war and how attempts were made to protect Sweden's capital with often limited financial resources. Many projects remained on paper or were prematurely abandoned due to "lack of funds." During peacetime, defence works deteriorated, only to be hastily and seriously reinforced during times of unrest or war.

Today, many of Stockholm's permanent defence installations have been demolished to make way for new development, but numerous fortresses, sconces, bunkers, tank barriers, and artillery emplacements still exist. They can be found along the Baltic Sea coast, in the Stockholm archipelago, in Stockholm County municipalities, and especially within the City of Stockholm. They represent an important and tangible part of Stockholm's history. Some are protected as listed buildings, designated as cultural landmarks, or enjoy archaeological protection. Stockholm's defence remnants from the wartime preparedness years are not legally protected and will not achieve heritage status until 2044.

After the Defence Act of 2000, all ERSTA batteries along the Baltic Sea coast were dismantled except for the ERSTA Battery at Landsort (gun number 3), which is to be preserved and made accessible to the public, serving as a reminder of "the Swedish people's defence efforts during the nuclear threat of the Cold War." The ERSTA system can be considered the endpoint of the era of permanent defence in Sweden.

== Medieval fortifications ==
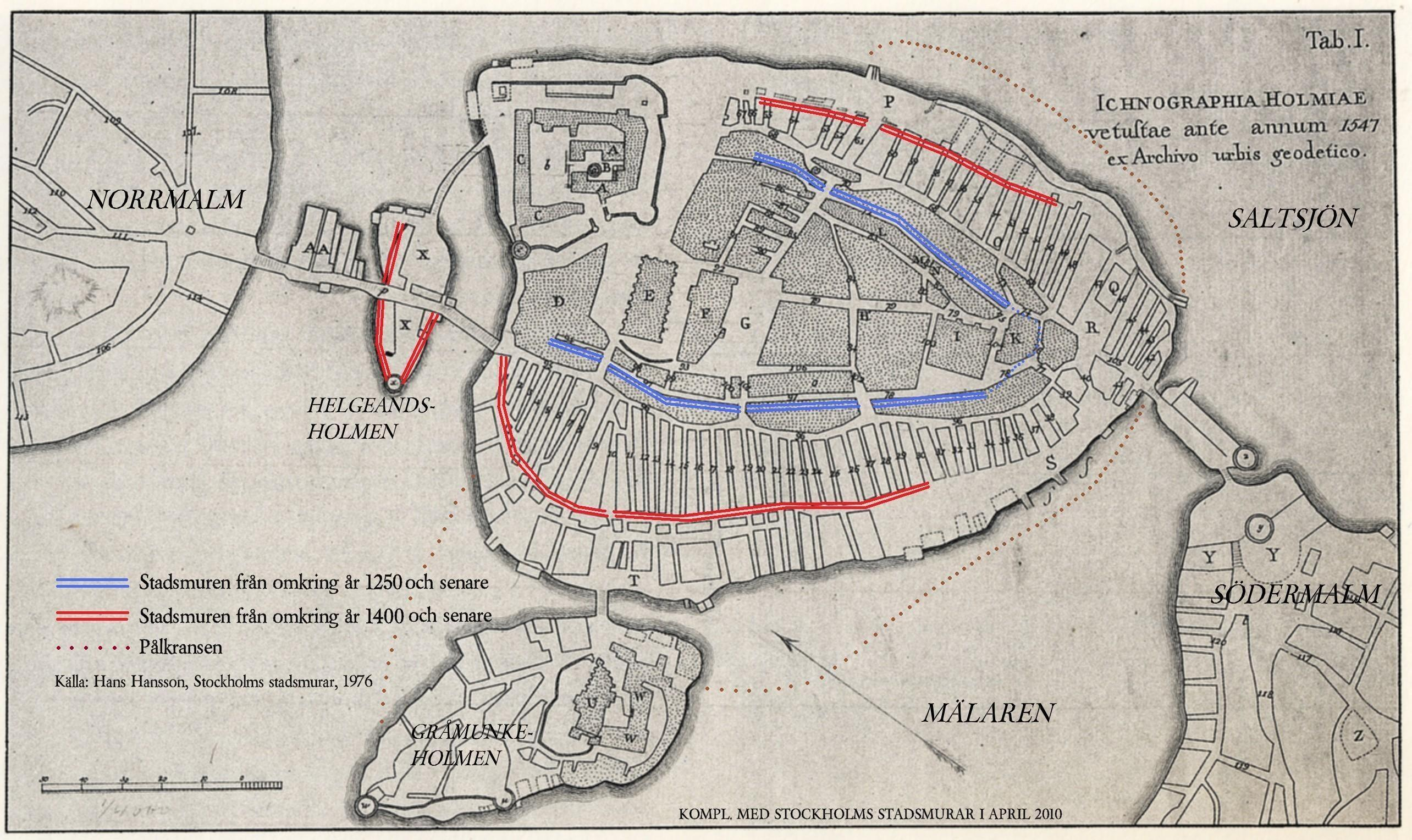
Stockholm's two city walls drawn on a map of the city in the middle of the 16th century. The blue line represents the older, inner city wall. The red line represents the newer, outer city wall.

The oldest permanent defence installations in Stockholm date back to the late 13th century and the early 14th century when the older inner city wall was constructed around the inner parts of Stadsholmen. It originated from the Tre Kronor Castle and formed a heart-shaped perimeter around Stadsholmen, the Stockholm of that time. The castle itself was protected by a robust wall and a central tower. Before the founding of Stockholm in 1252, there might have been a simple defence structure, a keep or something similar, on the northeastern part of Stadsholmen, possibly as early as the late 12th century.

Fortification construction in Stockholm has been influenced by the city's unique location between Lake Mälaren and the Baltic Sea, giving it a strategic key position. Therefore, it was essential for the city wall to expand with the city's growth, and in the 15th and 16th centuries, a new outer city wall was built. A likely location for the western stretch of the 15th-century wall was along the eastern side of Lilla Nygatan, while the eastern wall ran through the present-day block east of Österlånggatan. The exact location is challenging to determine because the wall was moved outward as the city expanded. Today, a visible remnant of the western outer city wall exists in the form of the foundation of the Lejon Tower, which can be seen in the breakfast and conference room of Hotel Victory, Lilla Nygatan 5. Besides parts of Stockholm's northern city wall, which can be found in the Museum of Medieval Stockholm, the foundation of the Lejon Tower is the only visible remains of Stockholm's outer city wall.

In the north and south, the city was protected by bridges equipped with windbreaks at Norreport and Söderport. Walls and towers were also constructed on Gråmunkeholmen (present-day Riddarholmen). From that era, Birger Jarls torn still remains.

During the Middle Ages, the "fortress" of Stockholm endured severe sieges, and the citizens were often called to arms. Two events have left a particular mark on Stockholm's defence and wartime history: in 1471, when King Christian I of Denmark camped at Brunkeberg but was repelled by Sten Sture the Elder's peasant army, and in 1520, when Christian II of Denmark was able to capture the city. The city's permanent defence had withstood several sieges, albeit often with heavy losses, but the Danish capture of Stockholm in 1520 was due to the city surrendering after a blockade and pressure. The city's protected island location made it difficult to conquer. Hostile attacks on Norreport or Söderport always failed. Olaus Magnus wrote: "The city gates of Stockholm inflicted greater expenses on the Kings of Denmark, expended on failed storming attempts, than the ten largest cities in their own realm."

During Gustav I of Sweden's reign, the city's fortifications were well-maintained, and he organized a national defence strategy where the enemy would be met far outside the capital. He protected Stockholm's inlet with a blockhouse (hence the name Blockhusudden) and had Vaxholm Fortress built in the 1540s as a barrier against hostile fleets. At the same time, Gripsholm and Uppsala castles were fortified. Even during the reign of John III of Sweden, work was done on the capital's fortifications.

== Permanent land and coastal defence during the Great Power Era ==
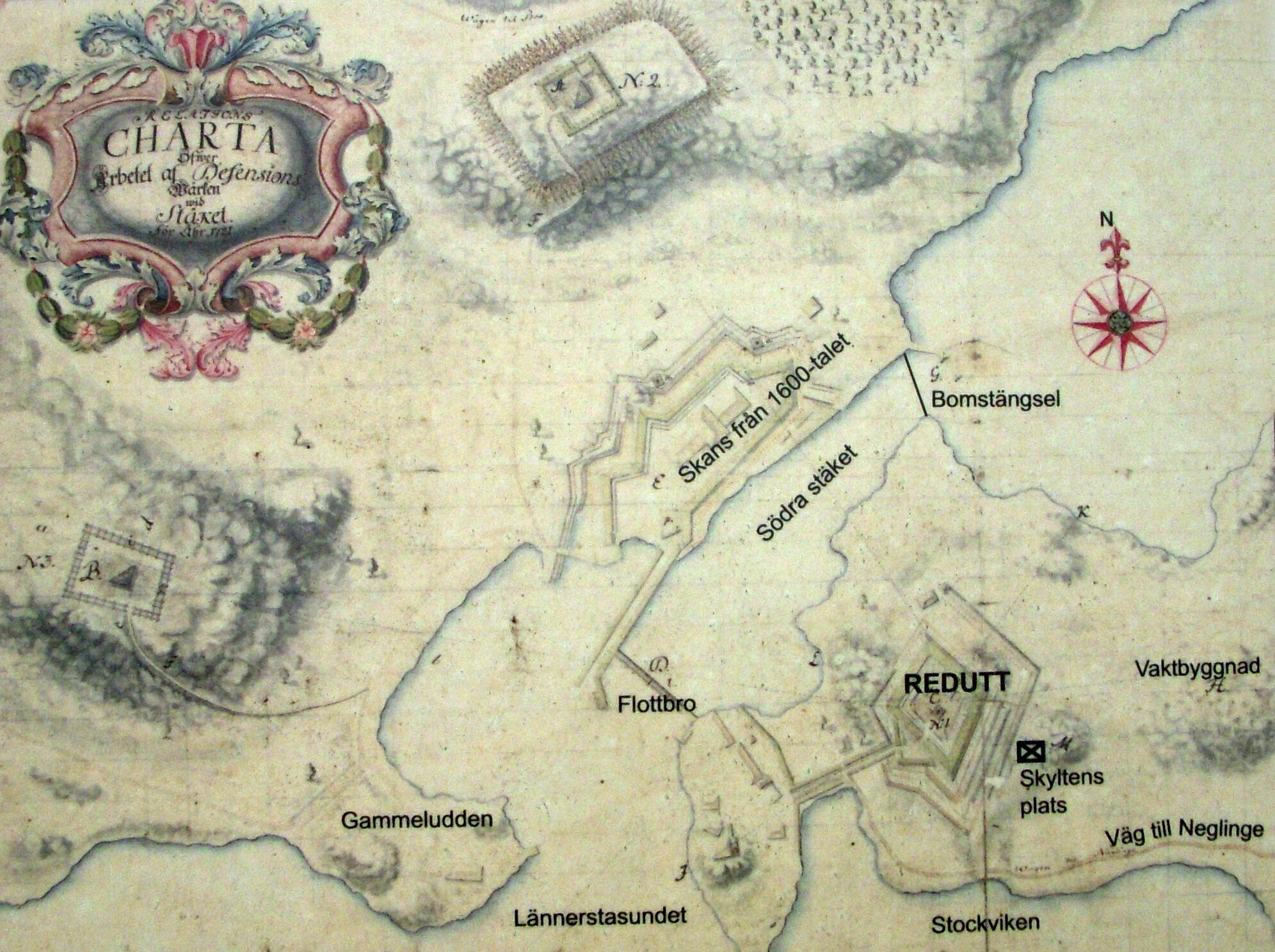
Map of fortifications at Baggensstäket

During Gustavus Adolphus' reign, Stockholm began its transformation from a medieval small town into a modern European metropolis. The city engaged in trade and maritime activities. The city walls had served their purpose and were hindering the city's expansion, so they were demolished. The demolition of Stockholm's younger city wall was so thorough that today, there is no trace of it above ground in Gamla stan. The city's street grid was redesigned based on contemporary modern grid planning, but there were still threats to the capital. The major adversary was Denmark, but Poland and later Russia also caused concerns, leading to the construction of sconces.

During the second half of the 17th century, the council of war and Field Marshal Erik Dahlbergh was the great fortification architect of the era. He was an unconventional fortifier who often used round towers and cannons placed on multiple levels. He often had the fortification engineer Johan Peter Kirstenius by his side, responsible for the practical construction of defence installations.

During the war against Denmark in 1643–1645, known as the Torstenson War, it was decided to secure the eastern and southern land routes to and from Södermalm, near Gruindhen and Danvijken, with sconces and garrisons. At Danvikstull, there was a narrow strip of land between Lake Hammarby and Saltsjön (today's Danvik Canal). In 1644, Danvik Sconce was erected on the nearby hill, and in 1645, Söder Sconce was built at "Grinden" between Hammarby Lake and Lake Mälaren (now Årstaviken). The latter consisted of a hornwork with a forward moat and ditch wall that cut off the land tongue between Lake Hammarby and Lake Mälaren, as well as two rearward redoubts. Due to a lack of funds, Johan Peter Kirstenius, the leader of the sconce construction, was arrested for three months at one point because, in his eagerness to complete the fortifications, he had used funds intended for cavalry needs. Danvik Sconce was demolished in the 1770s, and in its place stands Fåfängan's restaurant and gazebo. The last remnants of Söder Sconce disappeared when Hammarby Locks were built in the mid-1920s.

In the Stockholm archipelago, sconces began to be established for the defence of Stockholm's coastline. These works were also led by Kirstenius. In 1623, he was given responsibility for Hörningsholm Sconces. The reason was rumors that Sigismund of Poland was amassing an army near Danzig for an attack on Sweden (which never took place). Hörningsholm Sconces would become an important part of Stockholm's coastal defence for the fairways through Skanssundet and Pålsundet to Södertälje for nearly 300 years. In 1656, Kirstenius began the construction of Dalarö Fortress, and in 1676, fortifications were added at Baggensstäket. He had also worked as an engineer on the strengthening of Vaxholm Fortress.

For many years, Söder Sconce and Danvik Sconce were the only major defenceworks near Stockholm. Besides, there were fortified installations at Fittja Bridge, Flottsbro, and Skuru. In 1709, Magnus Palmqvist proposed fortifications around the capital. This led to the refurbishment of Söder Sconce and Danvik Sconce and the commencement of a defensive work at Hornstull. However, work was interrupted in 1713 due to a lack of funds. In 1715, a bridge was built over Stocksund "to better defend the lakefront," and in 1717, a proposal for fortifications on the northern side from Ålkistan to Bällsta Bridge was drawn up, work was initiated but soon stopped again due to a lack of funds. In 1719, the existing defence works were once again restored, and sconces were also built at Baggensstäket and Fällström (the strait between Ingarö and Älgö). In connection with the Russian Pillage along the Swedish Baltic Sea coast, where the Russians aimed to force the Swedish government into peace negotiations, an incursion at Baggensstäket was repelled by Baltzar von Dahlheim in August 1719 (see the Battle of Stäket). In fear of further Russian attacks, he had Stäket Redoubt built on the southern side of Baggensstäket.

For Hörningsholm Sconces and Södertälje, things did not go well. In 1719, the sconces were manned by Swedish troops, but their defencespirit was not very strong: they marched away the day before the enemy's arrival. The population on Mörkö fled after the departing troops allegedly said, "Now you're rid of us, but soon others will come who will do you more harm." Södertälje and the surrounding coastal areas were subsequently burned and ravaged by the Russians, including the destruction of all sconces and Hörningsholm Castle. But the damage could have been even greater if the Russians had continued into Lake Mälaren, where they could have freely burned and plundered irreplaceable castles and manors and attacked Stockholm "from behind." The quotes indicate that relations between the local population and the troops at the sconces were tense. Local farmers were often used as cheap labor in the construction and maintenance of the sconces. After the peace with Russia in 1721, fortification work ceased "so that the farmers would no longer be burdened."

The era of the Great Power ended, and "lack of funds" increasingly became the reason why grand plans for fortification constructions remained on paper. During peacetime, the installations deteriorated, and during times of unrest and war, they had to be hastily renovated. Söder Sconce and Danvik Sconce were last renovated in 1732, after which funds were lacking for further actions.

== The capital's permanent defence during the Age of Liberty and Gustav III ==
After the Great Northern War and the Treaty of Nystad in 1721, Sweden found itself in a completely changed military and defence political situation. The new superpower, Russia, posed a constant threat to its defeated and impoverished neighbor in the west. The issue of Stockholm's permanent defence had to be addressed in the context of the rest of the kingdom's defence challenges. However, the grand plans were never fully realized. Once again, there was a lack of resources because both major fortifications, Sveaborg and Landskrona Fortress, consumed the majority of the fortification funds during the Age of Liberty.

In 1786, Gustav III proposed that the Estates (Ständerna) appoint a defencecommittee tasked with examining the possibilities of establishing fortifications in the Stockholm area. A comprehensive proposal was presented in 1789 by Fredric Jacob Nordencreutz, which, however, was never implemented because the Estates refused to grant any funding.

== Fortification works on land and along the coast in the 19th century ==
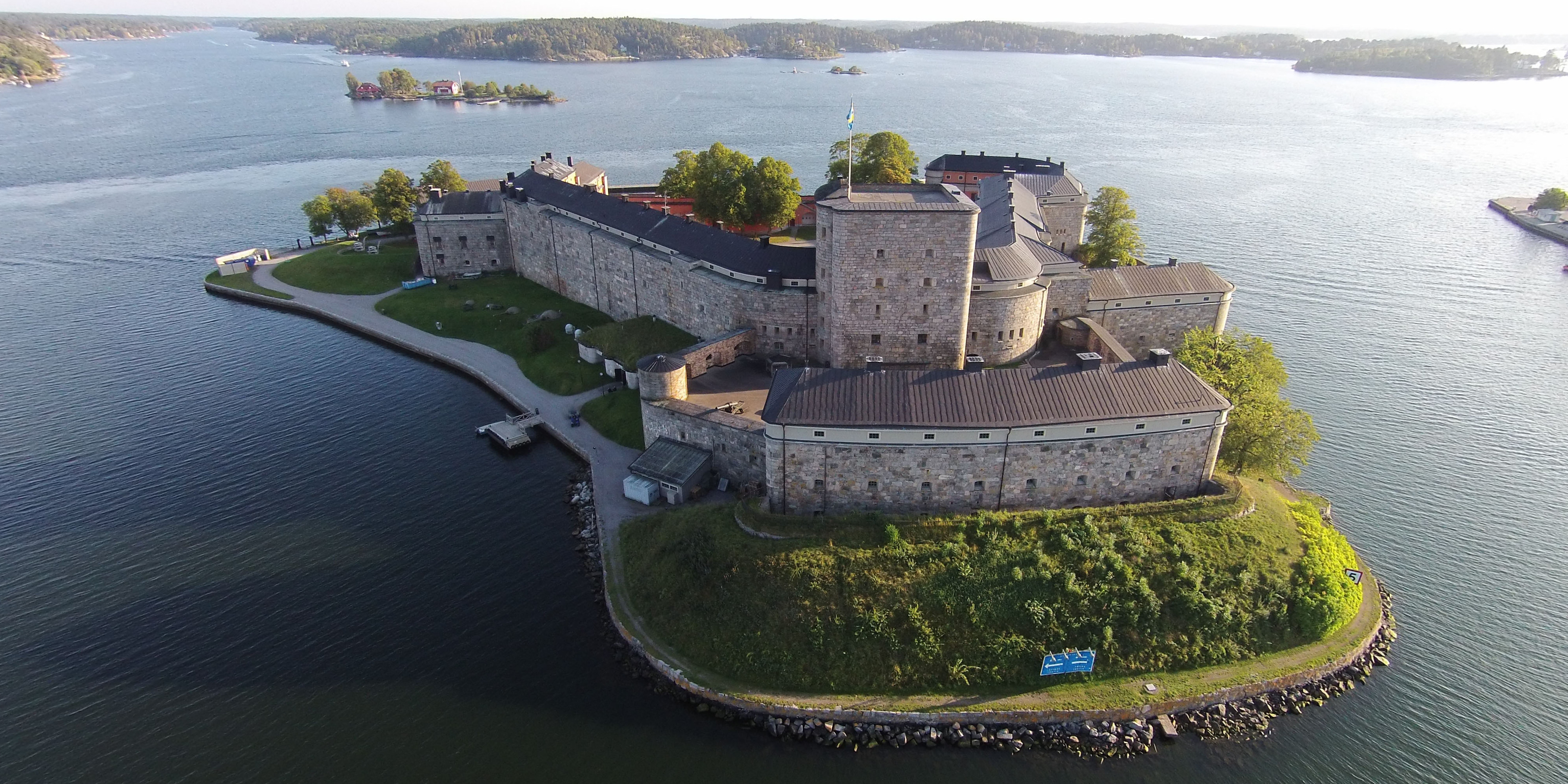
Vaxholm Fortress

After Finland and Åland were lost following the Finnish War, Stockholm suddenly found itself in a very vulnerable position on the eastern border of the realm. Once again, there was a need to revise defence plans. Throughout the 19th century, the question of Stockholm's protection against attacks, primarily from the east, was discussed. The fortification proposals of 1808, as well as the recommendations of the Defence Committee in 1826, did not result in any concrete outcomes. In 1831, construction of two fortifications near Karlberg, led by Carl Stål, began but was already halted in 1833 due to lack of funds. Parts of one of the fortifications are still preserved and are called the Russian Walls.

In 1856, a fortification committee was established under Crown Prince Charles (later Charles XV) with the aim of addressing the defence situation for Stockholm, protecting the city from bombardment with a ring of 42 strong fortifications. According to the contemporary concept of central defence for Stockholm, 17 sconces were planned for the northern line and 25 for the southern line. The northern line (Stockholm's northern fortification) was intended to stretch from Karlberg in the west through the current Bellevue Park to Värtahamnen in the east, while the southern line (Stockholm's southern fortification) would run from Liljeholmen in the west through Nybohov, Årsta, Johanneshov, and Blåsut to Lilla Sickla in the east.

The immediate reason for the fortification plans was the political unrest in Europe and the Crimean War of 1853–1856, during which French and English warships sailed into the Baltic Sea to combat the Russian fleet. During this time, reinforcement and expansion work was carried out at Vaxholm Fortress, including the construction of Rindö Redoubt.

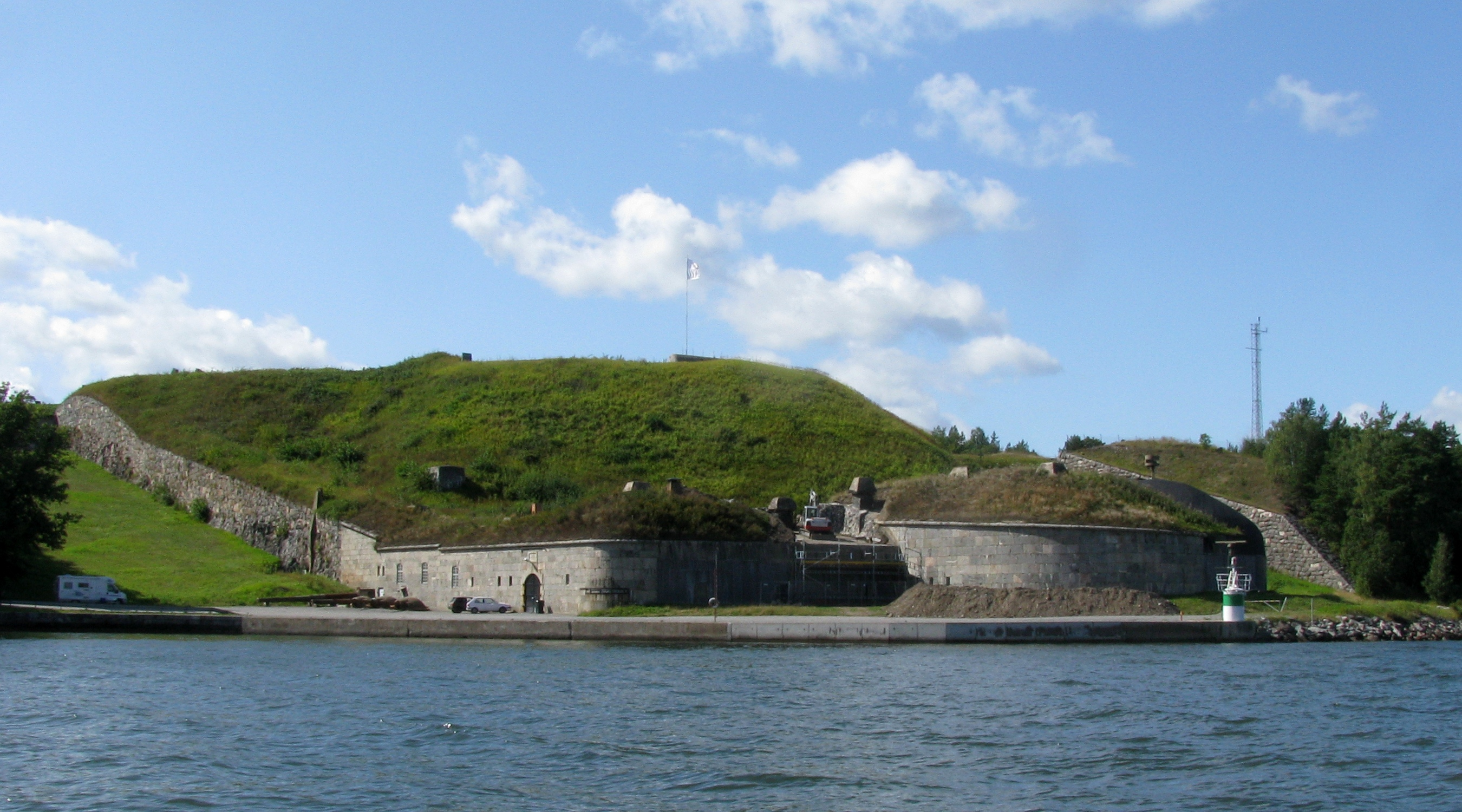
Oskar-Fredriksborg Fortress

The cost of the entire project, including defence lines north and south of the city, was estimated at six million riksdaler. However, the fortification committee's proposals from 1856 remained on paper, with the exception of a larger fortification work on the plateau at Johanneshov, which began in 1859. Johanneshov Sconce was also not completed, and work was already halted in 1861 due to the defence concept being considered outdated and a lack of funds. However, if the sconce had been completed, the entire installation would have covered an area of approximately 500x500 meters, equivalent to the entire Globe area.

During this time, several major and costly infrastructure projects were undertaken in Stockholm, including the construction of the Western and Northern Main Lines, the building of the Sammanbindningsbanan ("Connecting Railway"), and the introduction of modern amenities such as waterworks, gasworks, and power plants. There was also the need to implement the Lindhagen Plan, the comprehensive urban renewal plan for Stockholm carried out during the 1870s and 1880s. The decision was made to allocate the limited defence funds to strengthening the fortification line in Stockholm's archipelago, including the sinking of obstacles and mine barriers in certain fairways to Stockholm and Södertälje.

During the second half of the 19th century, Vaxholm Fortress proved incapable of withstanding the new pointed projectiles from rifled cannons. As a result, a new modern fortress, Oskar-Fredriksborg, was built at Oxdjupet to defend the entrance to Stockholm, constructed between 1870 and 1877. In 1902, Vaxholm Fortress's defence area extended from the straits west of Resarö to northern Värmdö, comprising a total of 37 batteries, mobile artillery, mines, infantry, and a reserve of mobile units, including engineering units and a balloon detachment.

Towards the end of the 19th century, a new defence policy thinking emerged. Central defence was replaced, primarily due to the construction of railways, by a border and coastal defence strategy, and Stockholm was integrated into this new defence policy. There were also private initiatives to strengthen Stockholm's permanent defence. This included the Palmqvist Foundation for Stockholm's fortification, established by Captain Fredrik Georg Stiernklo-Lillienberg-Palmqvist (1801–1861) and handed over to the city according to his will on 25 June 1850. Together with the Society for Stockholm's Permanent Defence (FFSFF), the Palmqvist Foundation collected money from wealthy citizens to build fortifications around Stockholm, known as the "Sausage Line." The reason for the establishment of FFSFF was a reaction to the deficiencies in the 1897 army regulations and the 1901 army regulations, which showed significant shortcomings in Stockholm's defence. The association was founded in 1902 by Chamberlain F.W. Edelsvärd and Colonel J. Bratt.

== Sausage Line and Vaxholm Line of the First World War ==
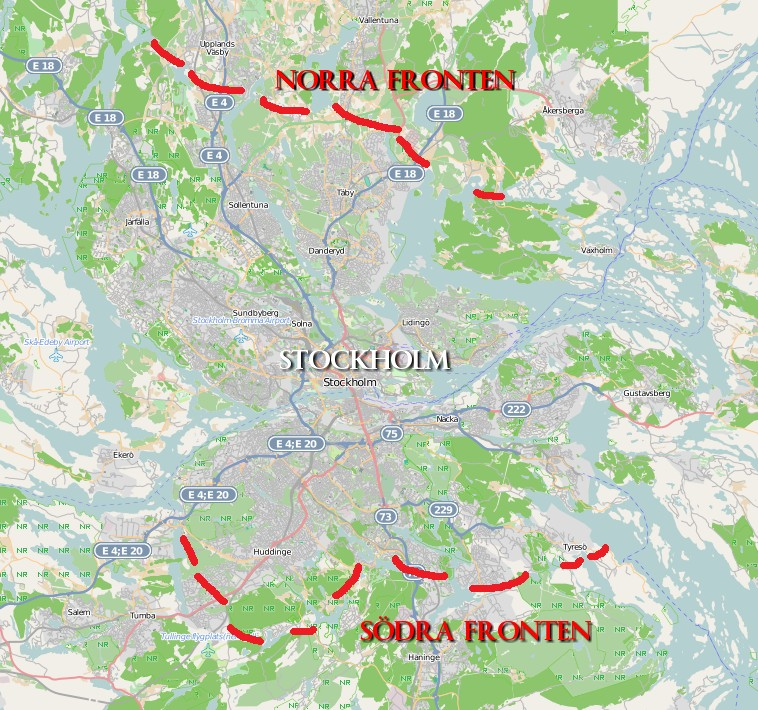
The alignment of the Sausage Line with the Northern and Southern Fronts overlaid on a modern map

Regarding Stockholm's peripheral defence, the surrounding waterways were utilized, and the passages between them were secured with about thirty fortifications of varying sizes, approximately 15-20 kilometers as the crow flies from the center of Stockholm.

The defence line was officially called the "Outer H Line," (yttre H-linjen) which stands for the outer main defence line, but it was commonly referred to as the "Sausage Line" (Korvlinjen) due to its sausage-like appearance. The typical "infantry sausages," officially known as "covered infantry and machine gun emplacements of concrete," were mainly constructed based on the same principle. The main part was buried underground, while the semi-circular roofs and embrasures rose low above the ground. The roofs could also be concealed under a layer of soil and vegetation. In combat situations, it was difficult to distinguish an infantry sausage from the softly rounded rock formations in the Swedish landscape.

The entire construction, consisting of the Northern Front and Southern Front, was financed by private individuals who gathered in the "Society for Stockholm's Permanent Defence" and the "Palmqvist Foundation for Stockholm's Fortification." The actual construction work was carried out by military engineering units under civilian leadership. Subsequently, the facilities were donated to the military.

The Sausage Line was primarily intended to be manned by infantry from the Landstorm, which consisted of conscripts older than 32 years armed with standard rifles, at most about 40,000 soldiers. This was before the consideration of armored vehicles or aerial attacks and when machine guns were still uncommon. The defence line was part of the defence organization until 1952. After 1921–1922 and during the interwar period, no further expansions of the defence line were made.

Regarding Stockholm's coastal defence, the so-called Vaxholm Line was established around Vaxholm, tasked with defending the waterways to and from Stockholm between Värmdö in the east and Resarö in the west. This area included the vital straits at Oxdjupet and Kodjupet, and the precursor to Vaxholm Fortress was already erected in 1548. In the 1730s, Fredriksborg Fortress and Oskar-Fredriksborg were completed in 1877. From 1914, the Vaxholm Line served as the main defence line. After 1925, this task was taken over by the Vaxholm Outer Defence Line, and the Vaxholm Line was decommissioned. The Vaxholm Line consisted of 23 battery positions extending from the 1st battery in the east (on northern Värmdö) to the 16th battery in the west (on the small island of Lillskär off Kullö). The line was divided into three sections, with Section 1 also known as the Värmdö Line with batteries 1 to 7. With the establishment of the Havsbandslinjen (constructed between 1933 and 1945), the Vaxholm Outer Defence Line had also fulfilled its role.

== Air defence positions and dragon's teeth of the Second World War ==
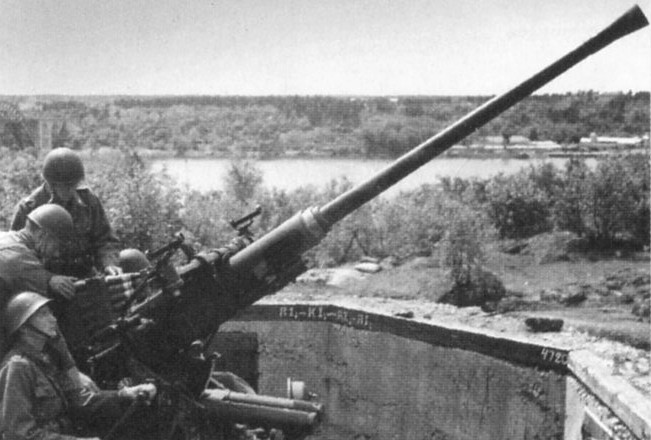
Tantolunden's anti-aircraft battery with a 40 mm anti-aircraft automatic gun

Before and during the Second World War, the forts of the Sausage Line were modernized, despite being outdated. A new military threat emerged, namely, aerial attacks, which had already been practiced in the later stages of the First World War. Therefore, immediately after the First World War, the establishment of Stockholm's air defence began. In 1918, Stockholm's oldest anti-aircraft gun, a 7 cm anti-aircraft gun m/18, was constructed. It was a field gun with special aiming devices mounted on a carriage, placed on a concrete foundation.

At the beginning of the Second World War, Stockholm was somewhat on the sidelines as a potential target compared to areas like Scania, Norrbotten, or western Sweden. Even before the outbreak of the war, the crucial role of air defence was recognized, and defence in the archipelago was reinforced with the so-called Havsbandslinjen (constructed between 1936 and 1945). However, apart from this, not much was done initially to defend the capital.

It may seem surprising that Stockholm's illuminated advertisements were often lit even during the nights of the Second World War, while other major European cities turned off their lights and lowered their blinds to avoid aiding orientation during nighttime bombing raids. There was indeed a ban on illuminated advertisements and storefront lighting during certain times, but it was not due to fear of air raids but more of a moral reminder to the Swedish people to conserve electrical power. Many people, however, were critical of this restriction and wanted to "burn at full blast" to make life during wartime a bit more pleasant.

It wasn't until 1943 that serious concerns began to arise. In a Finnish-Russian separate peace treaty, Stockholm suddenly came into focus, and a sudden attack from Germany or the Soviet Union on the capital became a fear. The fortification of Stockholm was initiated, and simple roadblocks were rapidly replaced by long rows of tank obstacles in the form of dragon's teeth. The Northern Djurgården tank obstacle, together with Bellevue Park's anti-aircraft position, was part of the northern inner H-line (main defence line), which extended from Lilla Värtan in the east to Tranebergsbron in the west. On the southern side of the city, there was a similar line that stretched from Tantolunden's anti-aircraft position in the west to Finnboda Shipyard in the east. Both lines were also referred to as the Stenstadslinlen ("Stone City Lines").

Inside the Stone City Lines, a core defence was established. In Norrmalm, the defence line ran along Rådmansgatan, while in Östermalm, it followed Engelbrektsgatan and Birger Jarlsgatan down to Nybroviken. On Kungsholmen, the line ran along Polhemsgatan and down to Riddarfjärden. On Södermalm, the core defence stretched from Torkel Knutssonsgatan in the west through Rosenlundsgatan, along the tracks of South Station, across Katarina Church's cemetery to Stadsgården in the east. The geographical extent of Stockholm's core defence roughly corresponded to the city's size in the 1650s.

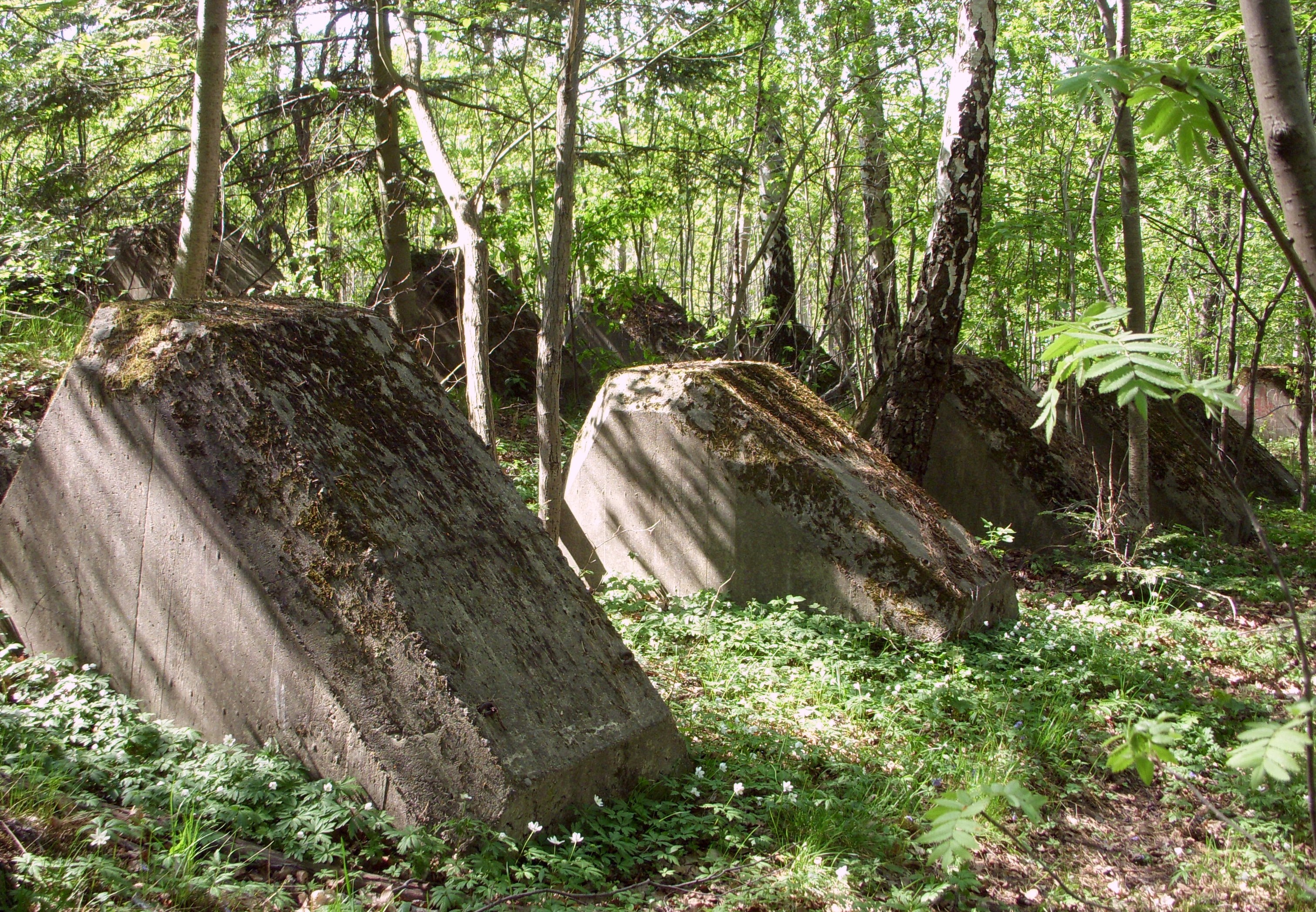
Triple rows of dragon's teeth about 300 meters south of Stockholm University

The so-called Gärdet Defence was established on Ladugårdsgärdet, outside the regular fortification plan, with the purpose of preventing airborne landings. According to the "Situation Map of Fortifications on Ladugårdsgärdet at the End of the World War," there were numerous foxholes and gun positions distributed across three areas on Gärdet. The central point of Gärdet Defence was located in an excavated bunker under Borgen (the facility still exists but is sealed). In case of combat, barbed wire could be rolled out, and posts could be erected to hinder the landing of enemy troops and equipment by aircraft or parachutes.

Around Stockholm in 1944, there were about fifty anti-aircraft positions with various armaments, as well as several locations equipped with searchlights and listening devices. Some of these were established before the outbreak of war in 1939 and supplemented the inner and outer H-lines around the capital. The most powerful batteries were equipped with 75 mm anti-aircraft guns, while the smallest ones had 8 mm anti-aircraft machine guns. These positions often had the task of protecting infrastructure objects like important technical installations, bridges, waterways, ports, and airfields. In 1943, decisions were made to defend Bromma Airport, Barkarby Airfield, and Skarpnäck Airfield. Despite the airfields being of different sizes, equally sized units were allocated to defend them.

Stockholm's anti-aircraft batteries were not continuously manned from 1939 to 1945, but during certain critical periods, units were stationed in the positions, such as in September 1939 (the outbreak of the Second World War), April 1940 (the invasion of Denmark and Norway by Nazi Germany), and the summer of 1941 (Operation Barbarossa, Nazi Germany's invasion of the Soviet Union). In late 1944, Stockholm's air defence was substantially reinforced with 49 heavy guns.

Despite having a well-developed air defence system in 1944, a Soviet bombing raid on Stockholm could not be prevented, likely through a Russian ruse. On 28 February 1944, a bombing unit entered just south of Dalarö and split into two groups. One group continued towards Strängnäs while the other turned towards southern Stockholm. Skanskvarn's anti-aircraft position, which was the closest, was unmanned, and the anti-aircraft units misunderstood a Soviet flare as a distress signal and refrained from opening fire. The planes could continue unimpeded, drop their bombs in Eriksdalslunden, and return to the Baltic Sea. The damage was limited, but diplomatic activity was significant. The incident was later interpreted by both sides as a "navigation error."

Only one anti-aircraft battery fired live rounds during the war. It was Tivoliberget's anti-aircraft position, located on Tivoliberget in Bergshamra, Solna. One winter day in 1942, the position shot down a German courier plane en route from Oslo to Finland, which had deviated from the established flight corridor. The plane made an emergency landing at Bromma Airport, and the incident was kept quiet by the Swedish government.

== Post-war rearmament and the scrapping of permanent defences ==
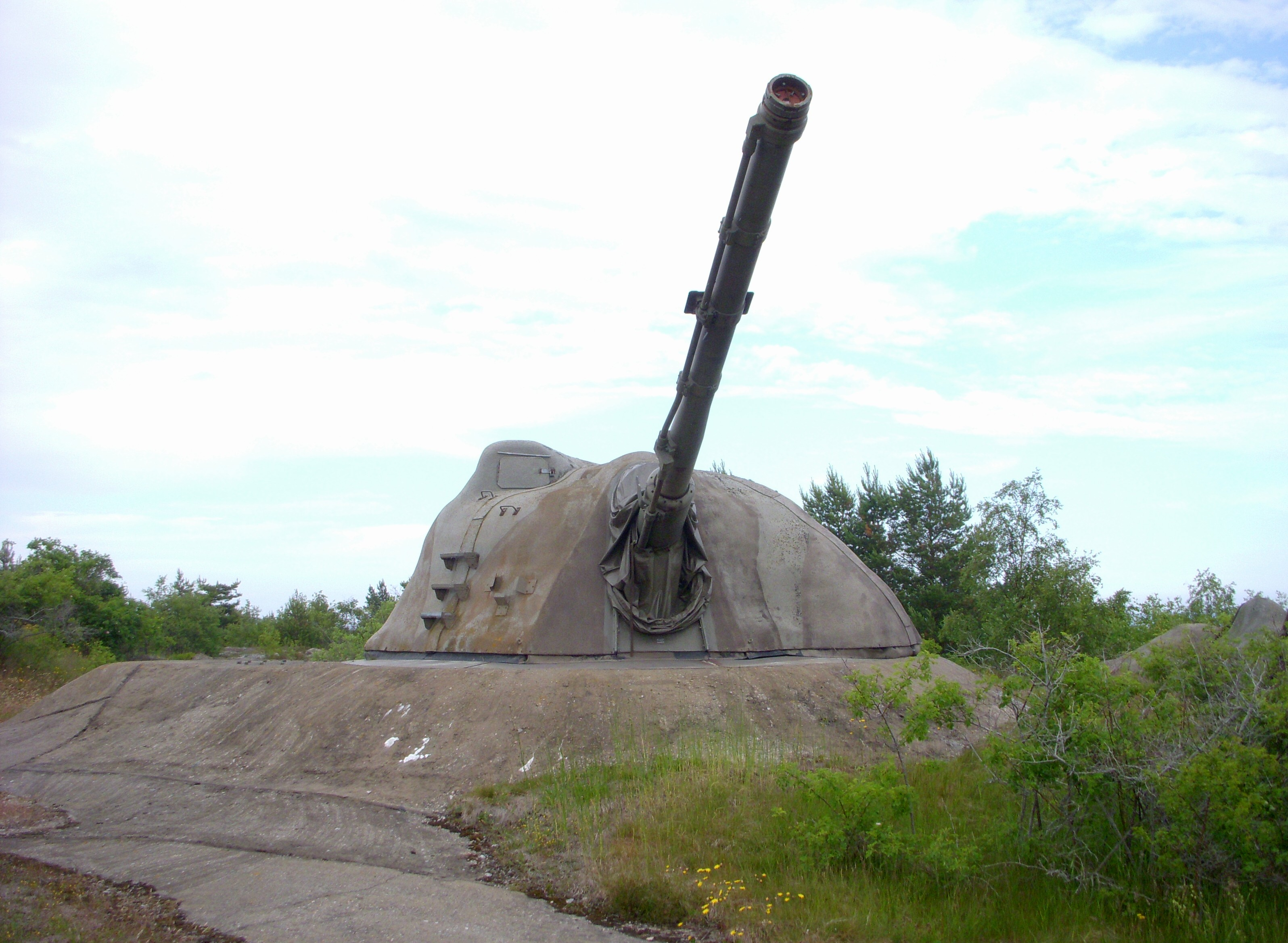
The 12 cm automatic turret gun model 1970 at Landsort

Stockholm's anti-aircraft defences were immediately disarmed after the end of World War II. The personnel were granted leave and all equipment was stored in warehouses. The fortifications were allowed to remain if they did not obstruct Stockholm's expansion. The same fate befell the dragon's teeth, large parts of which can still be found in the forests south of Stockholm University and Lake Laduviken. Concrete barriers remained in Stockholm's urban environment until well into the 1950s, such as at Norrtull, Tranebergsbron, and Gullmarsplan. In the early 2000s, many concrete structures that had survived were either demolished or sealed off to prevent harm to the public.

To protect the population from air attacks, around 14,500 "nuclear-proof" shelters of varying sizes were built in Stockholm County until the 1990s, providing approximately 1.7 million places. When applying for building permits for new constructions or extensions, the builders were required to obtain a "shelter permit" from the municipality, determining how many new shelter places were needed. In Stockholm City Centre, where shelter places were limited, 18 Metro stations were prepared to be quickly converted into shelters for the civilian population. Many of the city's larger shelters are currently used as parking garages, such as the Klara shelter and the Katarinaberget shelter.

It was also realized that a naval base in the middle of Stockholm was an inappropriate location. Therefore, in the late 1960s, the navy's ships and personnel were moved to the new, state-of-the-art Muskö Naval Base in the southern Stockholm archipelago. As recently as 2006, the Swedish military left many training areas in the Stockholm archipelago. For example, the entire island of Rindö became civilian property, and Huvudskär, Järflotta. In the northern archipelago, the defence ceased using most of the areas around Arholma, Svenska Högarna, and some of the many islets and skerries of Söderarm. However, the military have retain large areas in the southern archipelago and most of the training area at Söderarm.

The technological developments in the military sphere after World War II and during the Cold War era led to new threats in the form of nuclear warfare with radioactivity and thermal radiation. Well into the 1960s, Sweden also assumed that a hostile attack would be preceded by the use of small tactical nuclear weapons. In the 1960s, it was also time for the Swedish Coastal Artillery to replace several older heavy artillery systems. The replacement was the ERSTA system. The system consisted of six identical top-secret facilities constructed from 1973 to 1983 along Sweden's Baltic Sea coast. These were located at Söderarm, Slite, Ystad, Trelleborg, Holmögadd, and Landsort and were meant to defend Sweden from a Soviet attack. When it was built, ERSTA was one of the world's most advanced artillery systems. After the Defence Act of 2000, all ERSTA batteries were dismantled except the Landsort battery (gun number 3), which is to be preserved and made accessible to the public. According to the Swedish National Heritage Board, it is to serve as a testament to "the Swedish people's defence efforts during the Cold War nuclear threat" and has been declared a state-protected historical site. The ERSTA system can be seen as the endpoint for permanent defence in Sweden and Stockholm.

== What remains (selected items) ==
From Stockholm's medieval fortifications, there is a small remnant of the northern city wall on Helgeandsholmen, which can be viewed in the Museum of Medieval Stockholm. Birger Jarls torn, once a defensive tower in Gustav Vasa's fortifications from around 1530, still stands on Riddarholmen. Some of the many sconces, bastions, and redoubts from the 1600s, 1700s, and 1800s are preserved, albeit heavily overgrown. Others have been demolished, cultivated over, vandalized, or destroyed due to ignorance. This also applies to Stockholm's permanent defence installations from the First and Second World Wars. Some of the major fortifications in Stockholm's archipelago are preserved and have become museums.

Here is a selection of culturally and historically interesting preserved facilities, organized by their approximate date of construction.

- Trindborgen is located on the eastern side of Brandalsund near Ytterjärna socken in Södertälje Municipality. The fortress was established in the early 1400s and was still expanded in the 1860s. Excavations uncovered some medieval finds, including several parts of crossbows.
- Nässkansen, which, together with three other sconces, was intended to protect the inlet to Södertälje, is relatively well-preserved. A solitary 17th-century iron cannon now points toward the Baltic Sea, reminding us of the times of war and unrest in the 1600s and 1700s. The sconce is in ruins but is maintained by the Botkyrka Municipality as a historical monument.
- Furuholmsskansen, located at Skanssundet opposite Nässkansen, was modernized until the First World War. The fortification was decommissioned in 1927, as decided by the 1925 parliament. Thus, 300 years of defence efforts around Skanssundet and Hörningsholm came to an end. Today, the area is used for long-term camping for caravans and campers. A solitary cannon from World War I points towards the strait, reminding of the former military strategic importance of the area.
- Stäket Redoubt, which was part of Baggensstäket's permanent defence, still exists on Boo old cemetery next to Skogsö Chapel. The redoubt was established as a fortification initiated by Baltzar von Dahlheim from 1719 to 1743 and received its final form during the Finnish War of 1808–1809.
- The so-called Russian Walls are located on Ryssberget within Campus Solna's southeastern part. The area has dimensions of about 130 x 90 meters and displays fortifications from various times. One fort is known at least since 1667. From 1831 to 1833, the strong stone wall surrounding Ryssberget in the northeast was built. The wall is about 52 meters long and is between two and eight meters high. The corner facing north is made of finely cut granite blocks, while the remaining wall consists of roughly cut blocks with several drill holes. In the wall, which is joined with mortar, there are some embrasures.
- Johanneshov Sconce, the largest unfinished fortification of the 1800s in Stockholm, has remnants of the northern foundation wall remaining, consisting of a roughly 79-meter-long granite wall with two corner rondels and inner counterscarp galleries. The remains are now in the basement of a newly built office building on Arenavägen, just north of Söderstadion. The facility is a historical monument and can be visited by the public during office hours.
- Kastellet on Kastellholmen has a predecessor from 1667 that exploded in 1845 and was replaced by the current structure in 1848. Kastellet regained its defensive function during the Second World War. The tower and battery platform were equipped with rapid-firing anti-aircraft guns. Today, visiting warships are greeted by four salute cannons from Kastellet's viewing terrace.
- Vaxholm Fortress was outdated by the mid-1800s. In 1872, a test was conducted in which the armored ship Hildur, with its modern guns, shot through one of the walls. Today, the fortress houses the Vaxholm Fortress Museum with exhibitions on Sweden's coastal defence over 500 years.
- Dalarö Fortress has never seen battle and was bypassed by Russian forces during the 1719 Russian pillages. The Swedish Navy finally abandoned the sconce in 1854. Both Vaxholm Fortress and Dalarö Fortress are protected historic monuments and are managed by the National Property Board.
- Oskar-Fredriksborg is located on the western side of Oxdjupet in Vaxholm Municipality and was built from 1870 to 1877. The fortress was part of Stockholm's permanent defence until the late 1930s and has been a historic monument since 2002. Fredriksborg Fortress on the eastern side of Oxdjupet is also worth seeing. The fortress consists of a broad tower and a beach battery and was completed in 1735.
- Värmdö Line, also known as Myttinge Line or Batterilinjen ("Battery Line"), was a defence line on Värmdö designed to protect the Oskar-Fredriksborg fortification at Oxdjupet from attacks from the land side. The two-kilometer-long line with seven battery positions was built between 1899 and 1903 and runs between Myttingeviken and Vretaviken on Värmdö Island. The Värmdö Line continues with Byviksfortet (also called the 8th battery) on the Rindö side. The Värmdö Line area has been designated by Värmdö Municipality as a national interest for the Swedish Armed Forces and partly as a national interest for the cultural environment.
- Siarö Fortress began construction during the First World War and was completed in 1924. When the Second World War broke out in 1939, the fortress was already outdated. Modern bombers of the time could have easily destroyed the facility. Nevertheless, the fortress was used for military exercises until the 1960s when it was abandoned and began to deteriorate. In the 1990s, it was restored to serve as a military museum and tourist attraction.
- Of all the forts and gun positions along the Sausage Line, quite a few remain. For example, Västra Arningefortet (once part of the Northern Front) is in very good condition. The fort is now located in the Arninge industrial area, and the property owner has renovated the facility at their own expense. One of the largest and most well-preserved forts along the Southern Front is Måndalsfortet in Tyresö, which began construction in 1903 and was part of the defence organization until 1952. Other notable facilities include Lännafortet, Margretelundsfortet, Sjötorpsfortet, Karby battery, and Skavlöten machine gun bunkers. Sundby Fortress (also known as the "Eagle's Nest") is situated high on a cliff overlooking the southern bay of Lake Orlången in Huddinge Municipality. The National Heritage Board does not consider the Sausage Line to be of national interest. Thus, responsibility for its potential preservation lies with the County Administrative Board of Stockholm County, which, however, does not believe that the remaining structures of the line should be protected by historical monument status.
- Of the Northern Djurgården tank barriers, south of Laduviken, a large part of the tank obstacles in the form of dragon's teeth are still preserved, while the rest have been demolished.
- Among Stockholm's preserved larger anti-aircraft batteries are Bellevue Park anti-aircraft positions, Skanskvarn's anti-aircraft positions, Långholmen's anti-aircraft positions, Tivoliberget's anti-aircraft positions, and Norsborg's anti-aircraft positions. Additionally, remnants of positions near the now-closed Finnboda Shipyard can be found.
- Käppalaställningen on Lidingö is the only nationally protected defence facility in Stockholm's vicinity. It consists of several gun positions and three gun emplacements and began construction in 1939. The facility was restored and reopened in 1994, complete with a Bofors 80 mm anti-aircraft gun m/30. Käppalaställningen serves as a monument to Stockholm's air defence and is therefore unique in Sweden.
- ERSTA Battery on Landsort is located on Öja Island outside Nynäshamn. The facility was intended to protect Stockholm from a Soviet attack during the Cold War and was operational from 1977 to 2000. There were five more similar ERSTA batteries along the Baltic Sea coast. The ERSTA system can be considered the endpoint of Sweden's permanent defences. Gun No. 3 is proposed by the National Property Board to be preserved as a historical monument and museum.
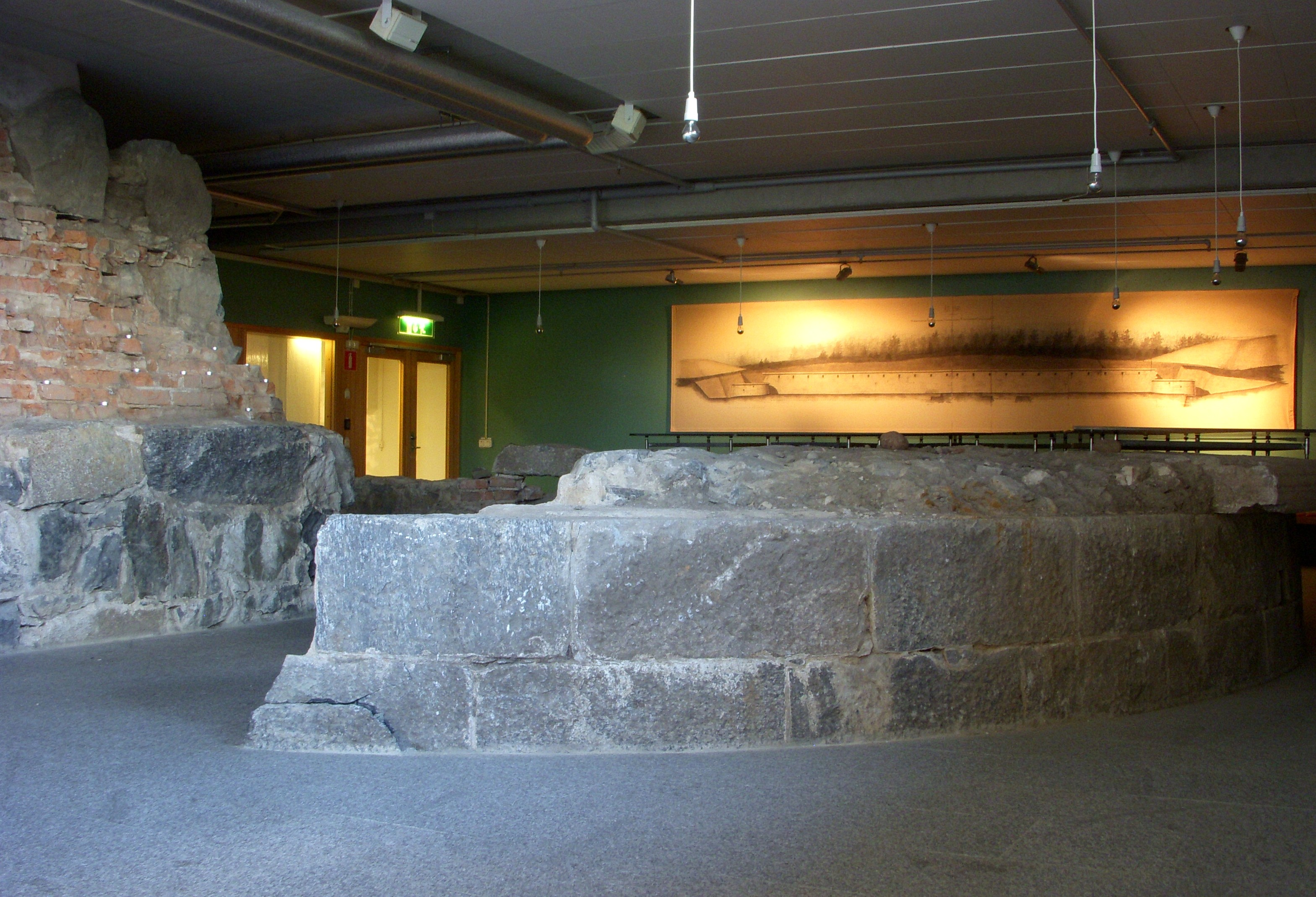
Johanneshov Sconce

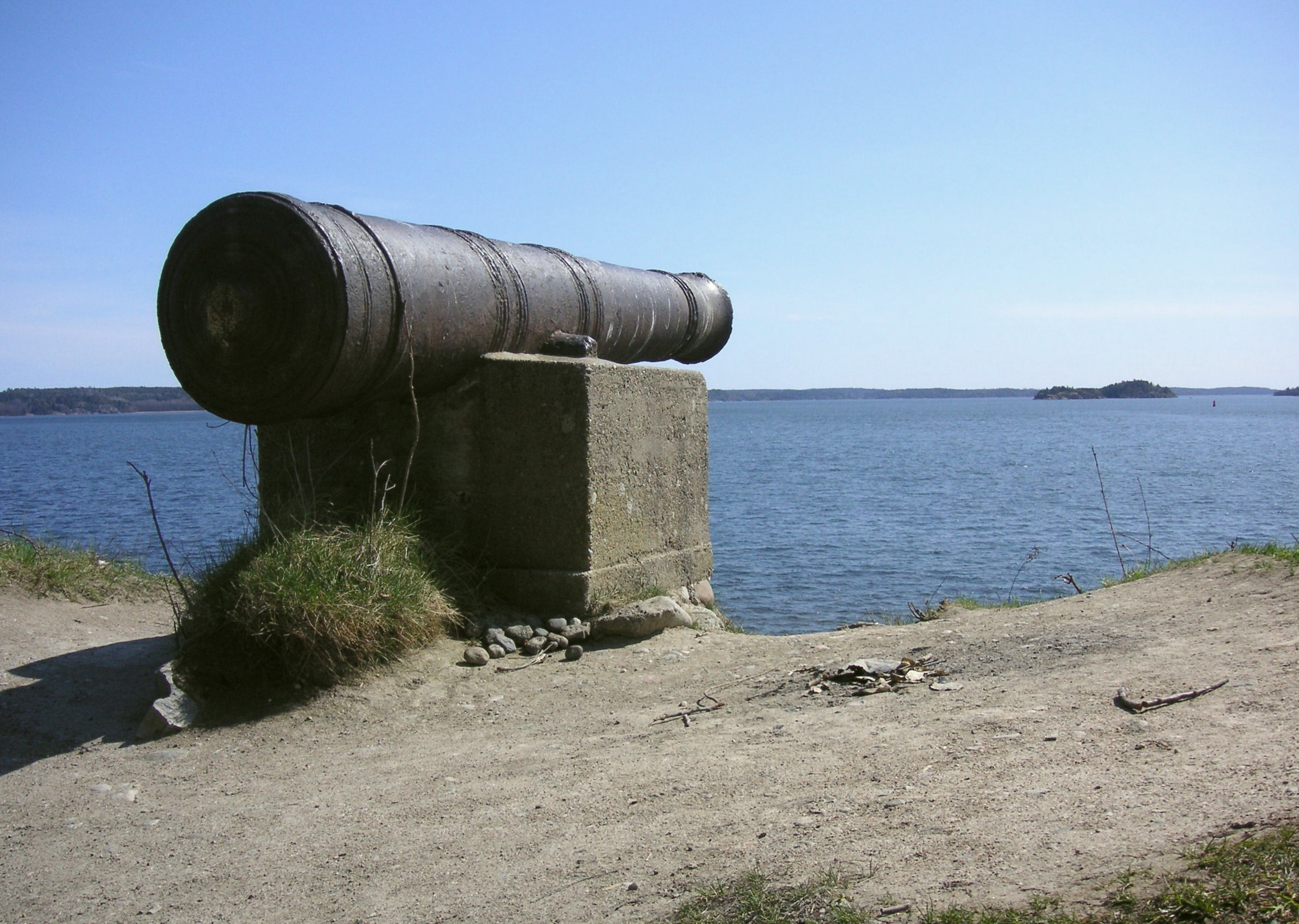
Nässkansen

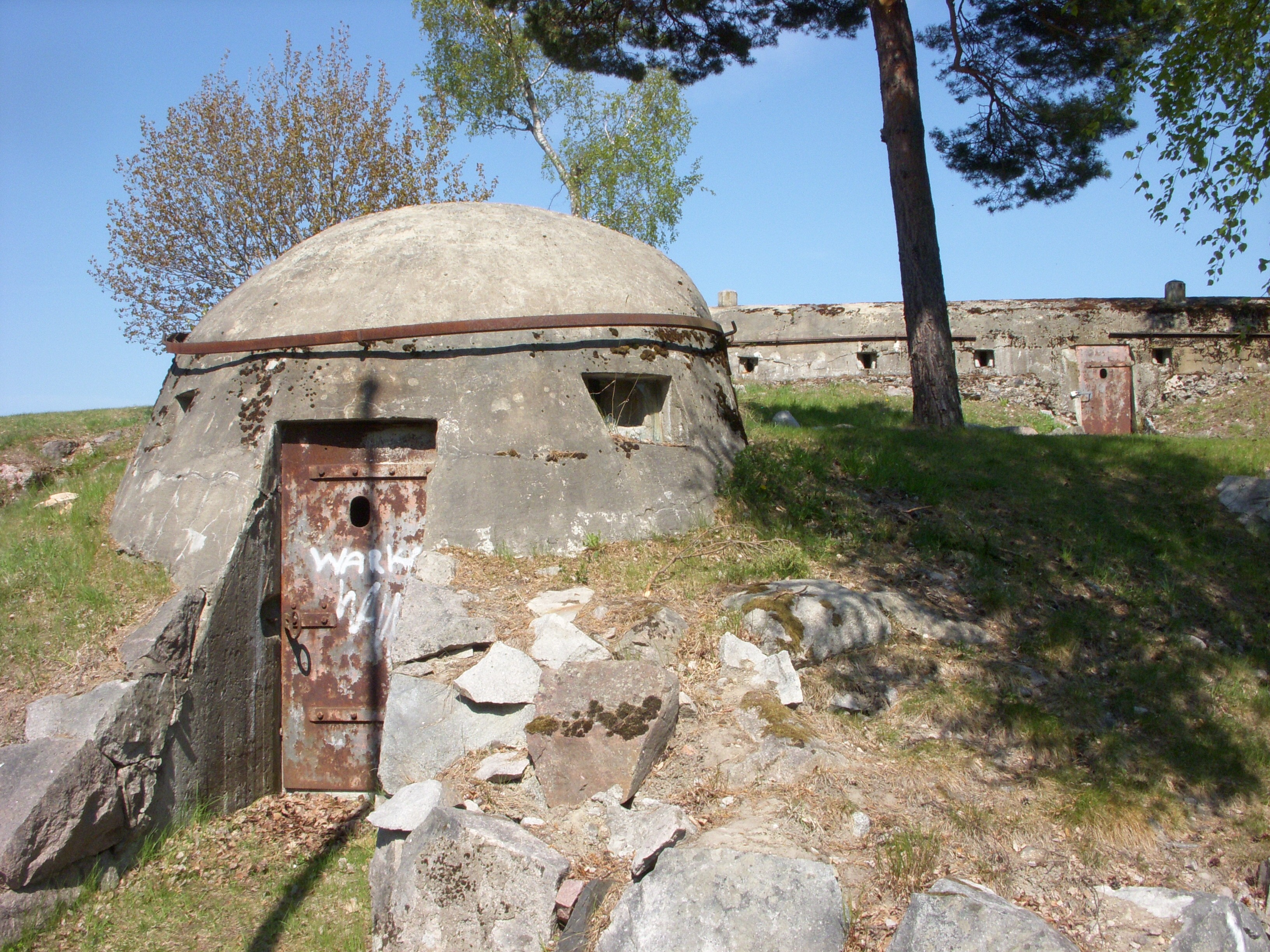
Western Arninge Fortress

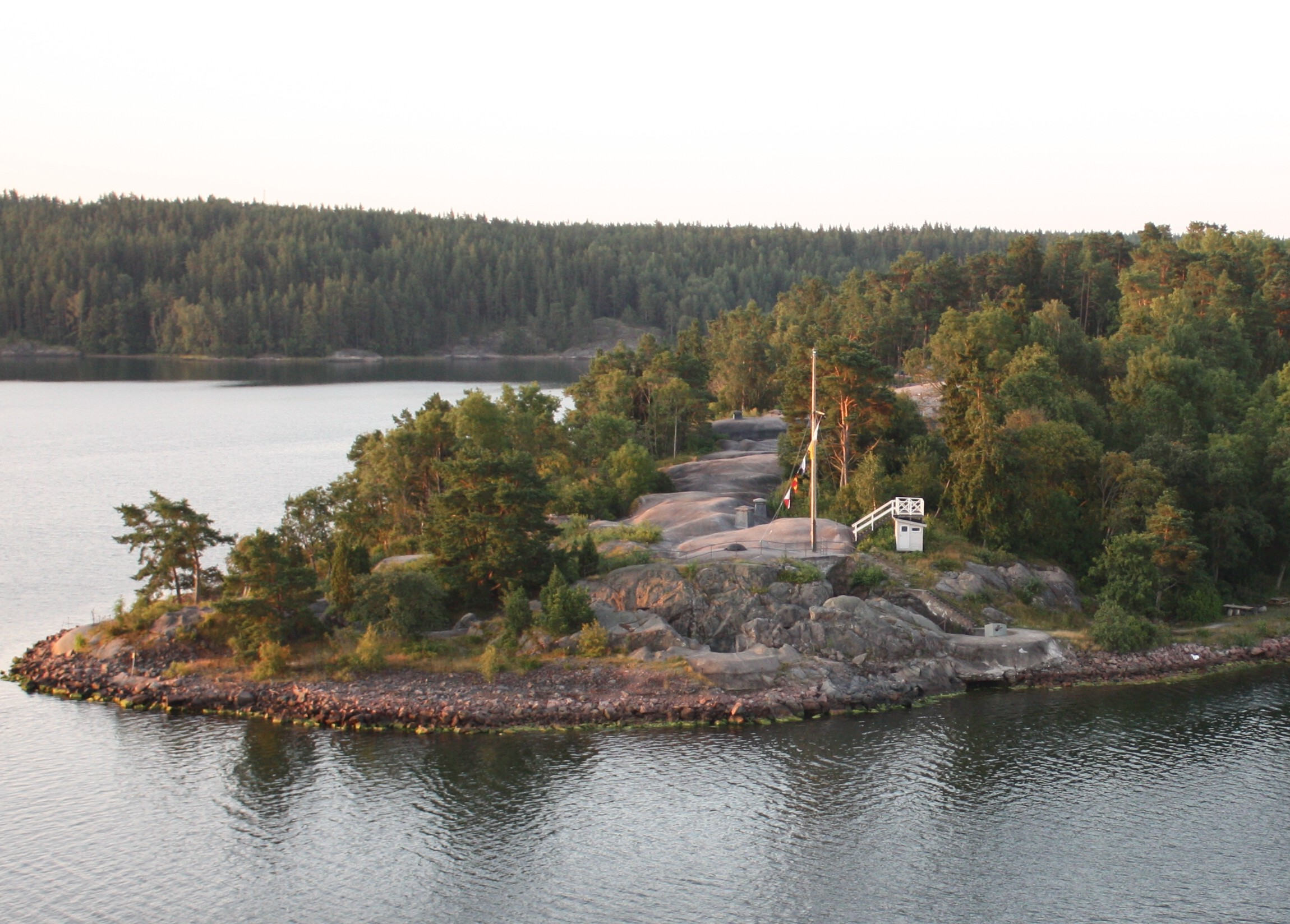
Siarö Fortress

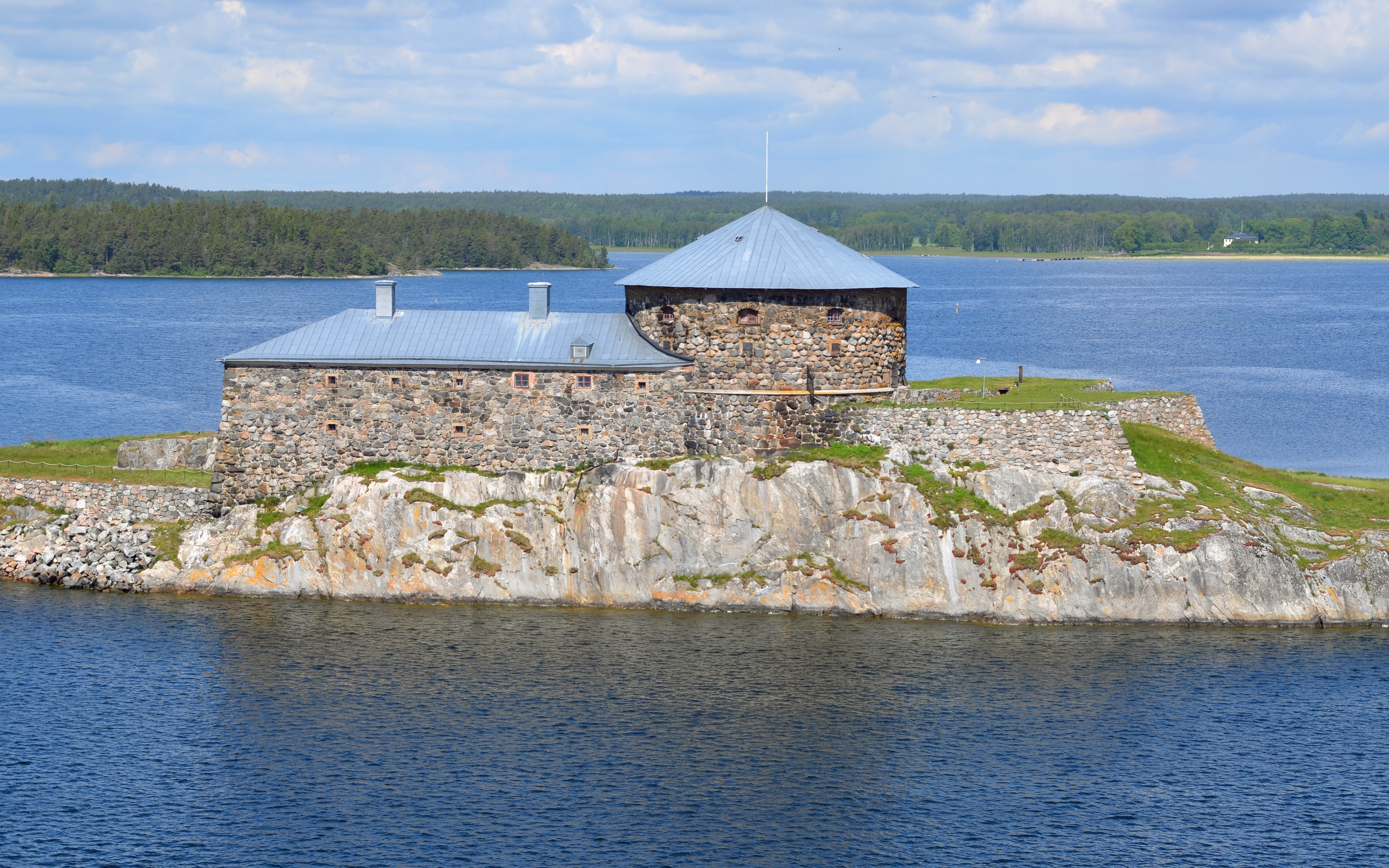
Dalarö Fortress
