= Brandalsund Manor =

Coordinates: 59°06′33″N 17°39′47″E

Brandalslund
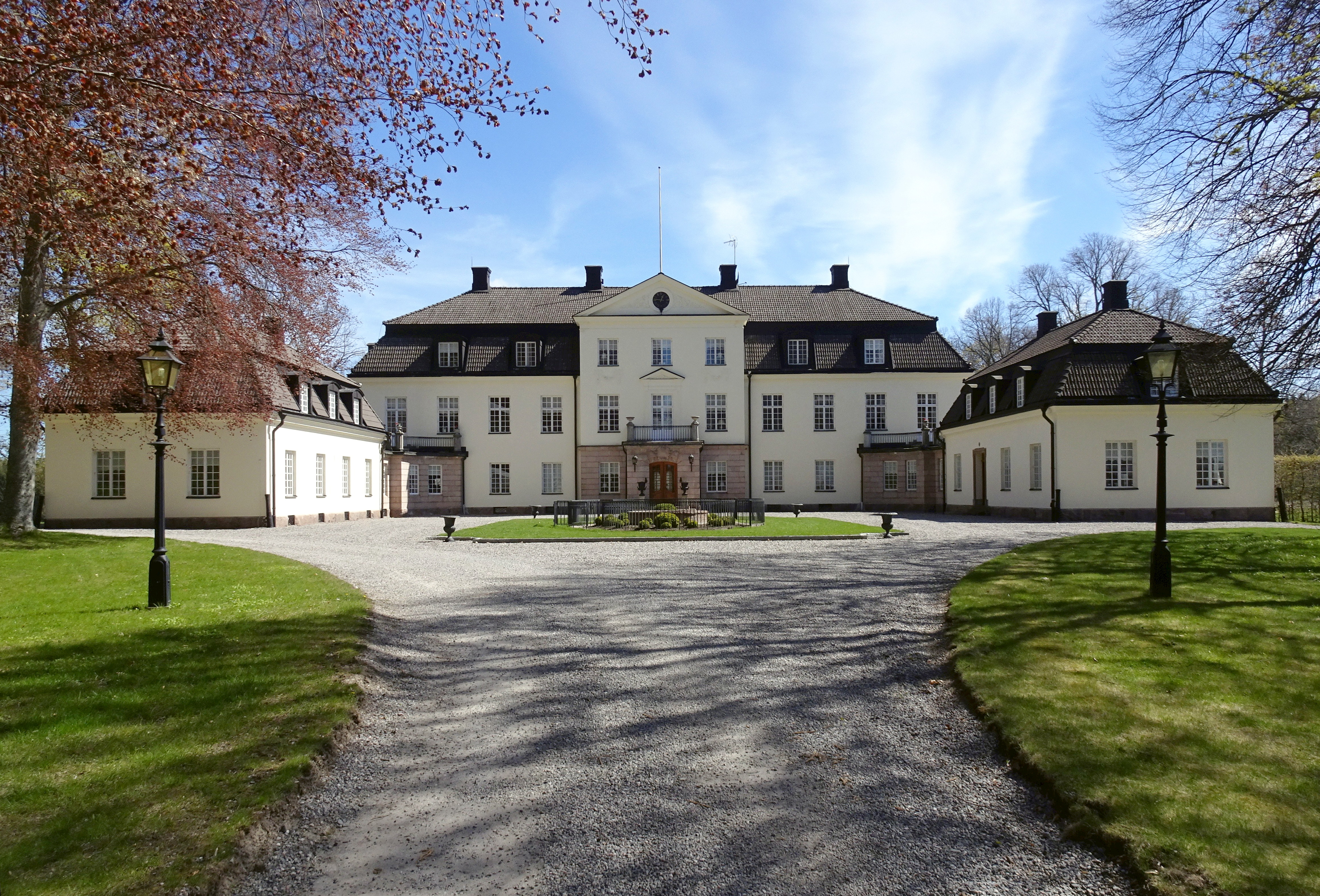
- Interactive map of the Brandalslund area

General information
- Location: Södertälje Municipality, Sweden
- Completed: 1918

Brandalsund Manor (Swedish: Brandalsunds gods) is a manor house in Stockholm County, Sweden. It is located in the Ytterjärna Church Parish in Södertälje municipality.

== History ==
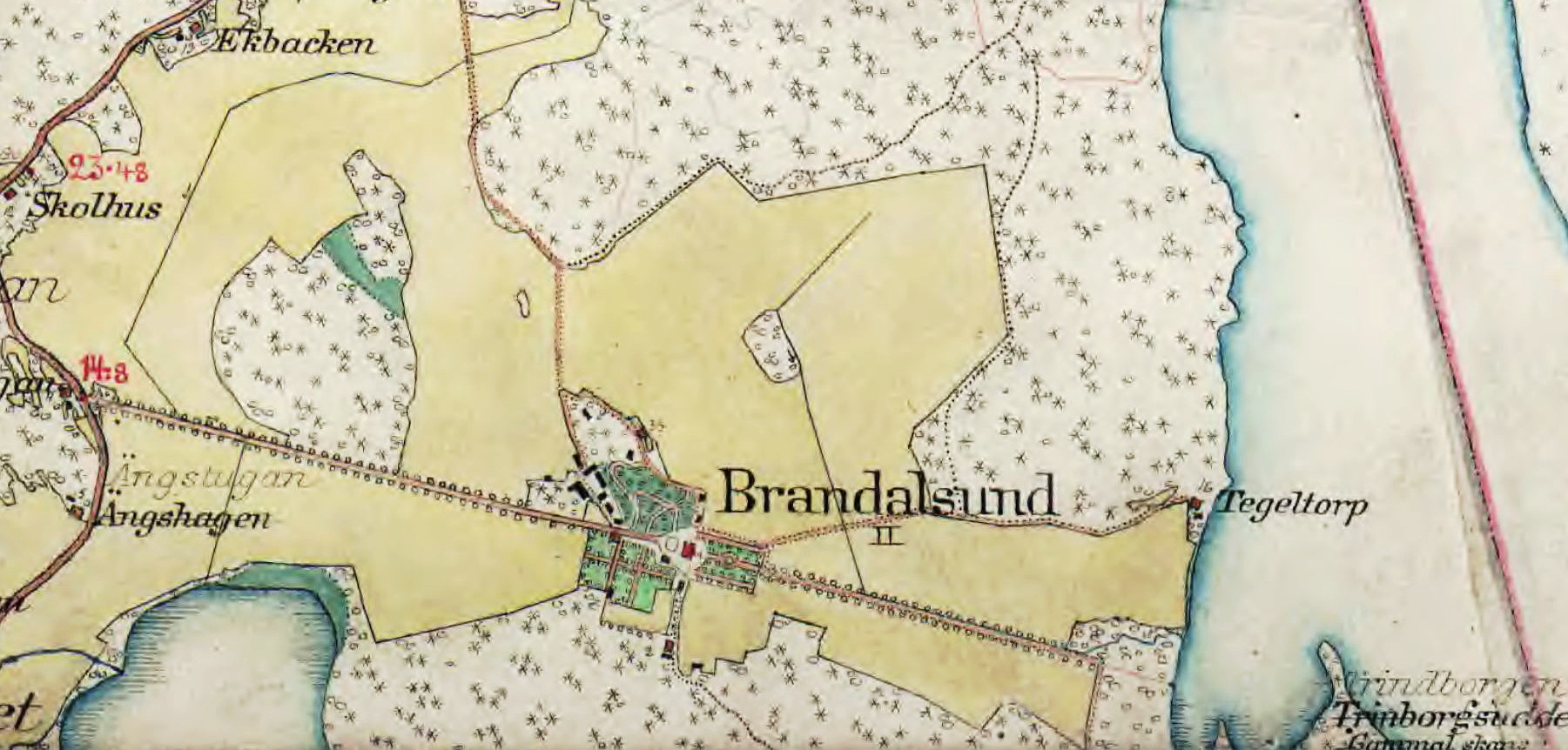
Map of Brandalsund (1901)

There has been a castle or manor house at this strategically important location probably since the time of the Kalmar Union. In 1435, this castle was destroyed during the Engelbrekt rebellion by Erik Puke. It was replaced by a manor house which in its turn was destroyed by Russian troops during the Russian Pillage (Rysshärjningarna) of 1719–1721. A later house was also torn down by the owner to make room for the presently visible main building, built in 1916–18 to designs by Thor Thorén (1863-1937)
