= Walls of Stockholm =

Former city walls of Stockholm, Sweden

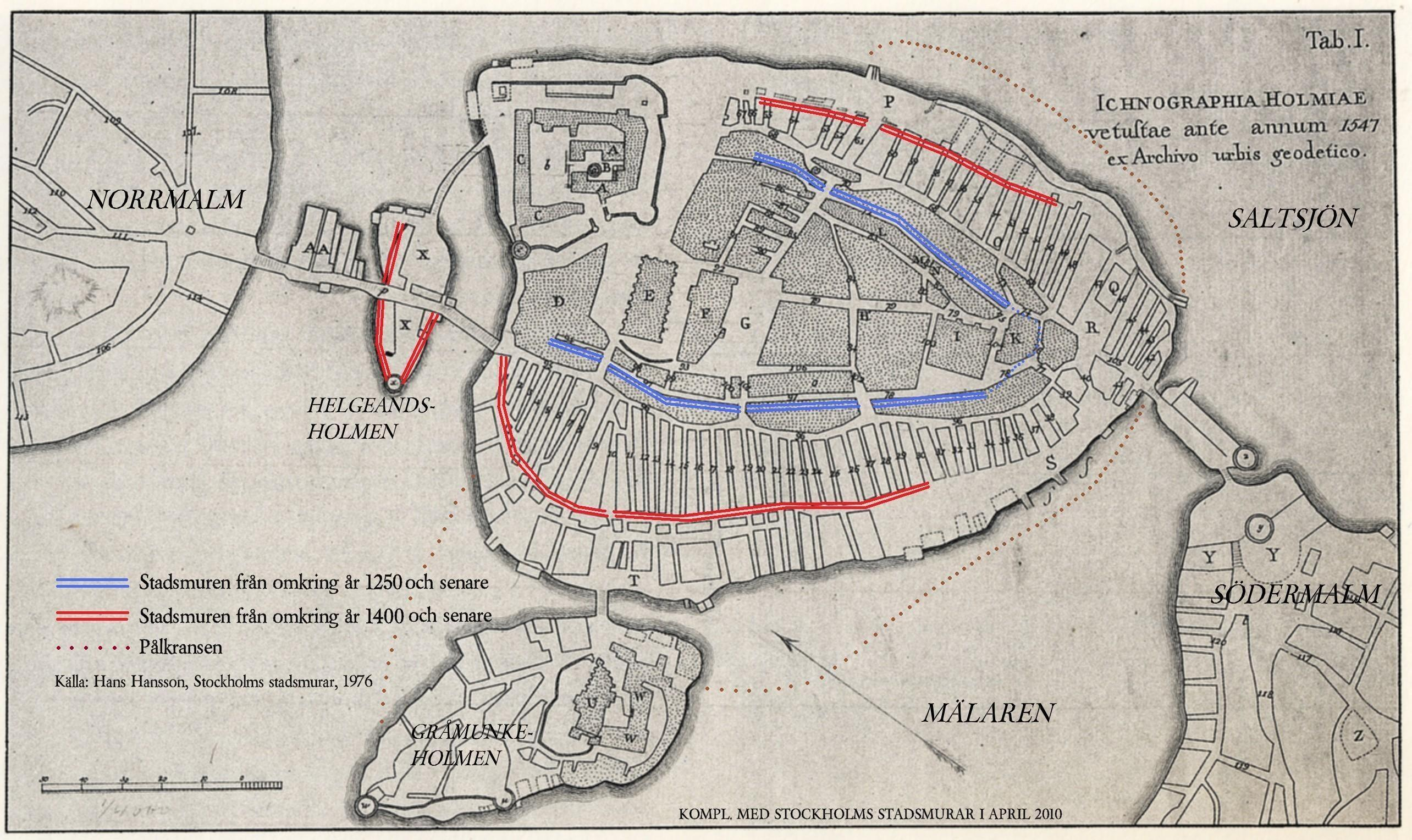
Stockholm two walls drawn in a map of the city in 1500-century. Blue lines represent the older, inner city wall. Red lines represent the newer, outer city wall.

The Walls of Stockholm (Swedish: Stockholms stadsmurar) were a medieval fortification and defense system that would protect the city from attack on all sides. While the old city walls' construction are largely unknown, the youngest city walls are now relatively well documented.

In Stockholm, there have been two medieval city walls: an older internal one built at the end of the 13th and early 14th century; and a more recent ones built during the 15th to 16th centuries. The younger ramparts lost their strategic importance in the 17th century and began to be demolished. A small remnant of Stockholm's northern city walls that were on Helgeandsholmen can now be seen in the Stockholm Medieval Museum.

== History ==
=== 13th-century walls ===
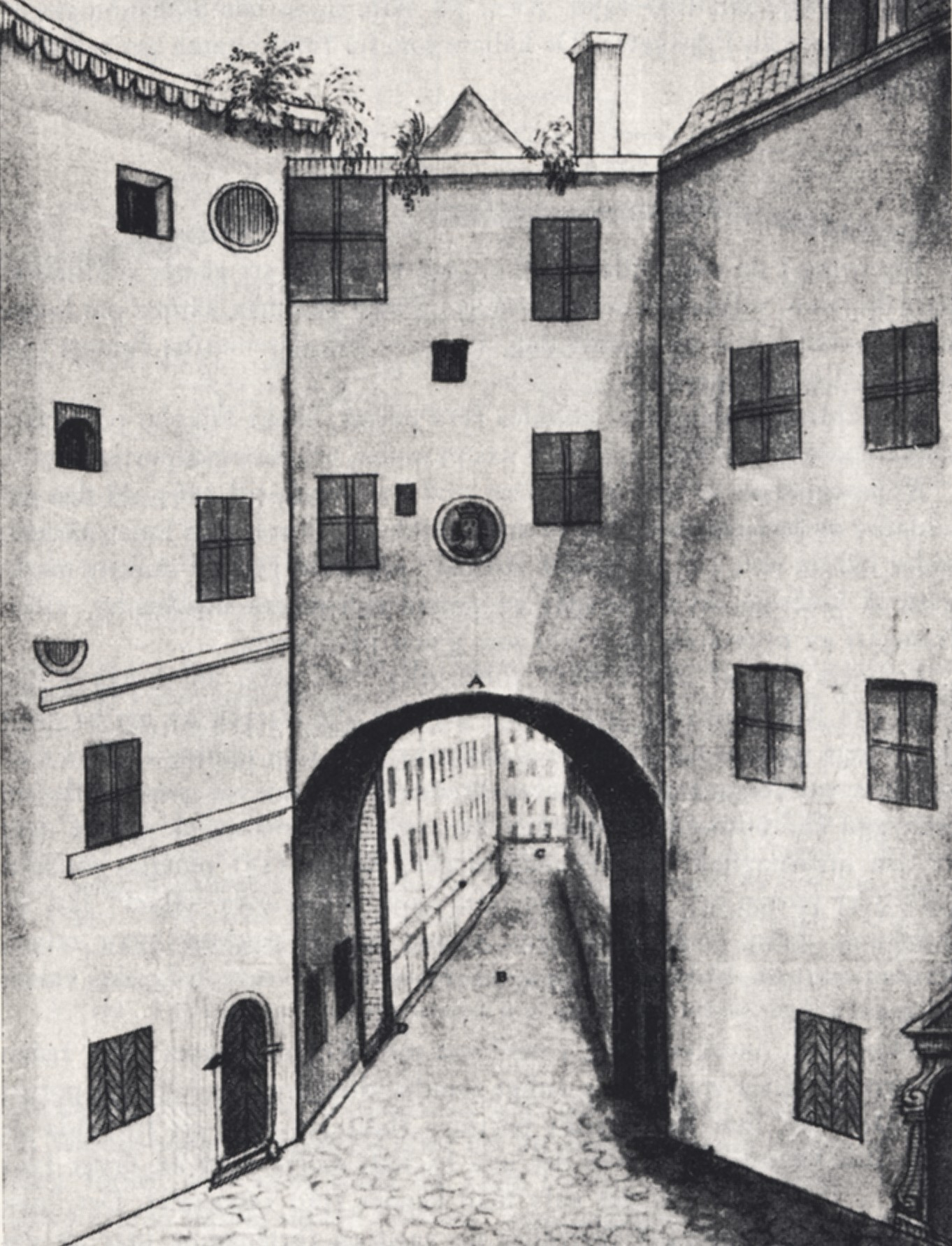
1685 Merchant's Gate in Köpmantorget, as depicted in a painting by Elias Brenner.

Stockholm's oldest city wall was originally a fortification line built during the second half of the 13th century around Stadsholmen. This line of fortifications is thus intimately connected with the origin of Stockholm, founded by Birger Jarl around the year 1250. The old city wall's exact design and location is disputed and unknown. According to one common belief, they are remnants of the oldest city wall preserved in buildings where the wall once was. At the excavations and building surveys, however, such residues have never been found.

A likely location for the city wall west route is along Prästgatan west side, while the eastern wall followed along Bollhusgränds and Baggensgatans east side. The precise location is difficult to determine specially because the wall moved outward as the city grew. The wall indeed was found in the surviving tax records of the latter half of the 15th century where the concept of 'prior to the wall' was used for the taxpayers who lived on the plateau of Stadsholmen.

'Between the wall' was a common term for the city area between Prästgatan, Bollhusgränd and Baggensgränd. These streets were Stockholm's inner ring roads that enveloped the heart-shaped of the Stadsholmens. Much of today's Prästgatan and Baggensgränd served as look-out points to the end of the north part of Tre Kronor castle. The southern tip of the city wall, including its southern port, was wiped out in the 14th century when the Black Friars' Monastery was built at this location.

Even the city wall construction differs in concepts. It may have been a granite-stone wall with an upper section of bricks. The west side, probably started as part of Åsbranten, while the eastern wall stood alone, both being approximately 7 meters high. Stockholm's oldest city walls may also have been a wooden construction, a type of palisade, which could well explain why it has not to date been found.

The city wall had four towers. The west wall stood to the north of St. Nicholas port, Shoemaker Gate and the Water Gate in the far south. The eastern wall had a door, the Merchant's Gate. It laid as an extension of Merchant Street approximately where the Merchant Square is today, and remained until the 1685 Merchant's Gate was portrayed by Elias Brenner shortly before demolition on 30 April 1687 'for its narrow passage sake'. The vault was in reality much narrower, about 1.6 m.

During the late 14th century people began to build plots outside the city walls. These lands had been gradually extended by paddings, and through rectification and land elevations. When Stockholm's oldest city walls lost its strategic significance, a new defensive wall was built further west and east.

=== 15th-century walls ===
The new city wall was built in stages. Already in the 14th century, a new defensive wall was built at the north-west part of Stadsholmen around Myntgatans street and to the north of Stora Nygatans route. The wall first protected the area outside the city centre, and the defensive line moved around 30 metres to the west. During a transitional period, there was also a wooded bank out there in the water. Remnants of these frontline fortifications could be documented in the 1940s, in connection with the excavation works in Kanslihusannexet and Kvarteret Cephalus.

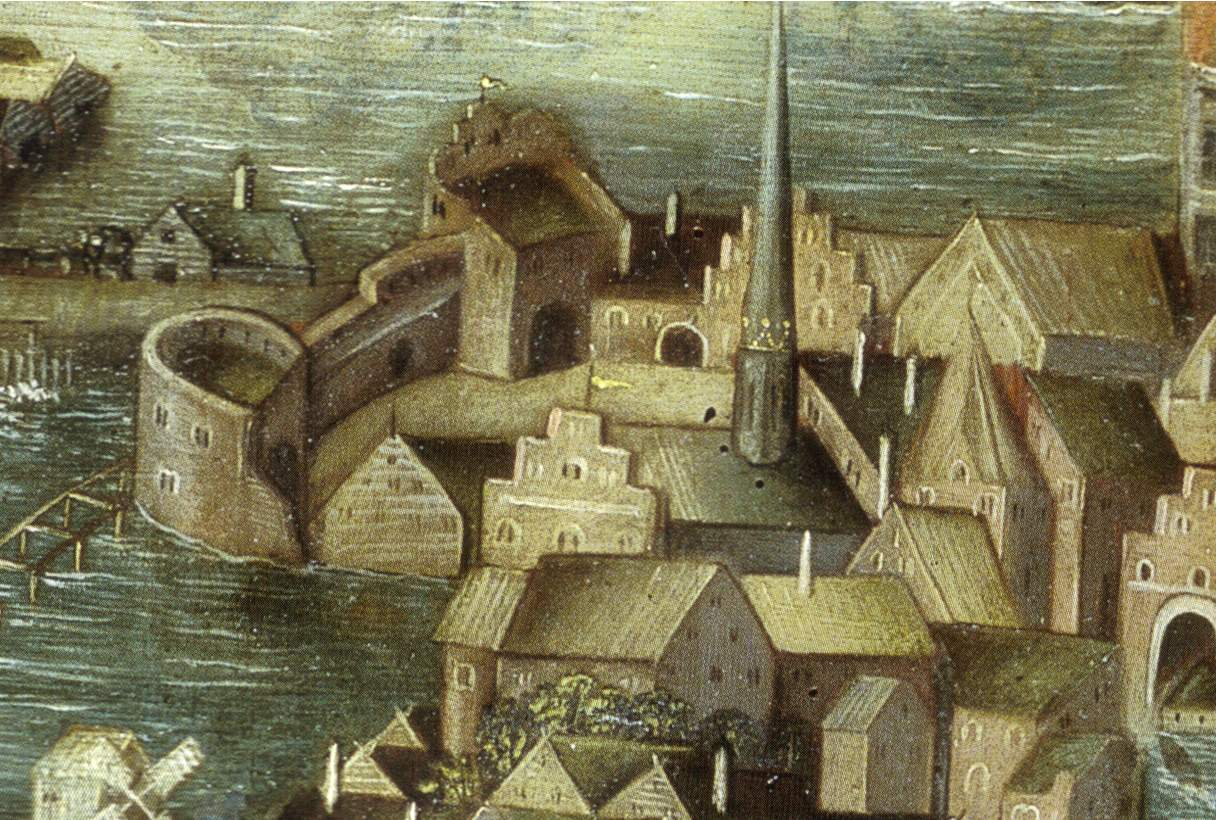
Northern city gate in 1535 as depicted in the Vädersolstavlan painting.

In the 15th century the construction of the city walls continued both to the west towards Lake Mälaren and in the east towards Saltsjön until the 16th century. Moreover, barricades were adapted all the time to the prevailing political and military-technical conditions. Therefore, the wall reinforcement was concentrated in the direction in which attacks on Stockholm were likely to come. This means that the wall to the east and Saltsjön strengthened during periods in which a Danish invasion by sea was feared, (Note: For example, during Sten Sture the Elder time in 1400 century) while reinforcements of Mälarmuren was carried out during the first part of Gustav Vasa's reign (c. 1530-1540), when attacks from domestic insurgents via Mälaren was feared to come.

Gustav Vasa led even the renewal of the outer defenses around Norreport, on Helgeandsholmen's northern part. The wall on Helgeandsholmen was built around 1530 in direct proximity to the former defence line. Today, Norreport's residues were found in the middle of Mynttorget. These were examined in 1935, 1939 and 1982 when excavation work for wiring began. The inner Norreport was first mentioned in 1409, but is probably older than that. The gate was demolished in 1672 and the upper part of the city wall in 1674.

An approximately 55-meter long piece of the northern mound was dug up from 1978 to 1981 for the renovation of the Riksdag building, which now is one of the main attractions of the Museum of Medieval Stockholm. The original height was most probably six feet. Near the eastern end of the wall, there was a great port with an outer door of iron. Gustav Vasa had a fortress built of bricks, including those from St. Johanneskyrkan.

In Vädersolstavlan from 1535 two south towers (Södertorn), which appear to have been semi-circular in shape, were reported. The inner (north) tower was re-erected in 1524 after it had collapsed the previous year. The outer (southern) tower originally had a roof hood. In 1637 the inner and outer Söderport were described, the latter to make way for the first lock, known as the Drottning Kristinas sluss (Queen Kristina's gate), which opened in 1642.

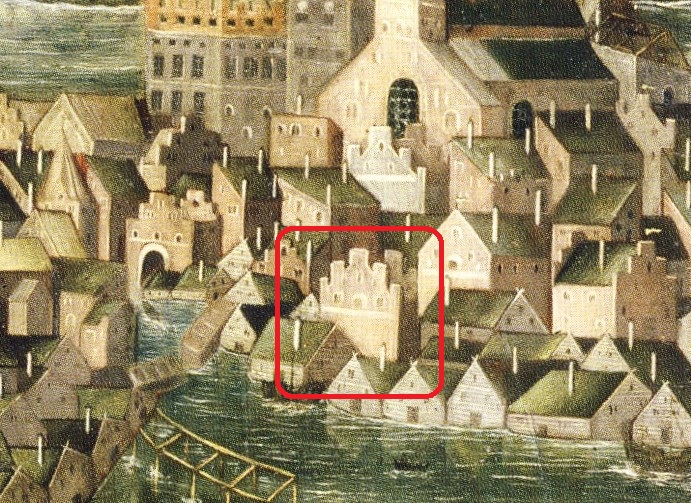
Gråmunketornet to the left of the archway and Lejontornet in middle of the picture, behind the boathouses, as depicted in the Vädersolstavlan painting.

Around 1530 Gustav Vasa built two towers in Gråmunkeholmen's northwest side. The northern tower, named after Birger Jarl's Tower was built with an unusual brick format during the 1700s, the same kind of brick that was used in Santa Clara Monastery, which was described in 1527. The south tower is now part of Wrangel Palace. It has also been found that the bricks for the tower had been used before, and that the mortar residue is not derived from the tower construction. Birger Jarl's Tower should therefore have been built of bricks from the Clara convent, during a two-year period that began in the autumn of 1527. The Birger Jarl's Tower was built in the 1200s, but the myth began to spread in the 1700s. It was Stockholm's oldest building then.

Stockholm's younger city wall had about 20 towers, in addition to the ones in Helgeandsholmen and Gråmunkeholmen. They were: Inre Norretorn (at today's mynttorget), Gråmunketorn (at the level of today's Stora Gråmunkegränd), Inre Södertorn (where today's slussplan) and Skultatornet (in present-day's Drakens gränd). In between, there were many defence towers, which were not all named. A few have been investigated by various archeologists during the excavation work, such as a tower at Kolmätargränd in kvarteret Cephalus. Along the west side wall there was also a Pulvertornet (Powder Tower, or Gunpowder Tower) and Bocktornet (Bock Tower). Fiskestrand towards Saltsjön, in present-day Kvarteret Diana, was flanked by two towers.

In the west there was Lilla tornet (Little Tower) and Stora tornet (Big Tower), the latter also referred to as the Lejontornet or Leijontornet (Lion Tower). A so-called dendrochronology survey, or tree-ring dating conducted in 1984, showed that the timber to the foundation piles for the Lion Tower was harvested in the winter of 1382–1383. (Note: Vädersolstavlan from 1525 shows the Lion Tower, behind the boathouses. Part of the Lion Tower foundations can also be seen in the restaurant Leijontornet. Figures according to Restaurant Leijontornet.)

== Pile drivers ==
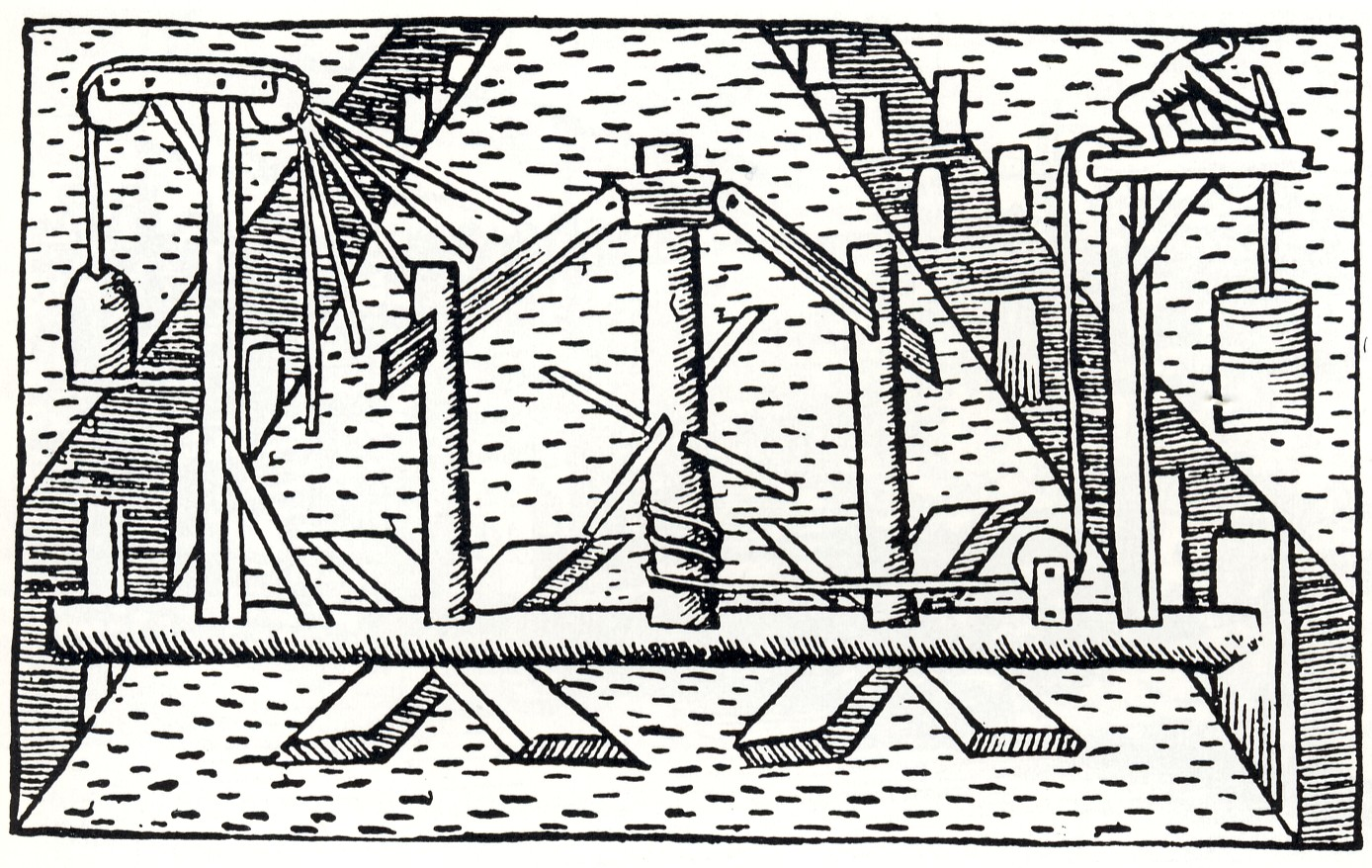
Double pile driver from the 16th century, with its large "bolt", according to Olaus Magnus.

Stockholm younger walls surrounded the city in full. It was above all the city's port areas which were open, in the west at Kornhamn and in the east at Kogghamn and Fisketorget. These were weak points in the city's defence. In the Middle Ages, therefore, pile drivers were added in Mälaren, Saltsjön and around the Stadsholmens respectively, southern and northern parts. The early pile drivers consisted of bars made of joined logs. In the Middle Ages this defense mechanism was simply called the "bommen". It was later expanded for it is mentioned in the Stockholm first surviving official book from 1419. There has been talk about the nyckelförvarare to the bars at Fisketorget, Korntorget, at Lejontornet and Draktornet.

Pile drivers, as they appear in 16th-century illustrations, consisted of dual deep foundations connected with longitudinal and transverse logs. Outside Kornhamn better wood was required because of the sheer depth of water. During the 1500s, the estate purchased several hundred piles which were 24 metres long or more. Later, it was difficult to deal with so very long timbers, so they began to experiment with nails and forged joint rings. For the recovery of the piles in the bottom of the lake a special pile driver mounted on the city's barge was used. In winter it could crack down piles of ice.

The pile drivers were entry openings were closed with bars at night. They functioned both as a tariff ceiling and border for the inner harbor area. In order to further make it more difficult for the enemy to reach Stadsholmens, ships were sunk inside the perimeter of the pile drivers during the Danes' siege in 1520. This defense works can be seen on many older designs, such as Hogenbergs 1500-century Civitates orbis terrarum engravings of Stockholm, the Blodbadsplanschen from 1524 and on the Vädersolstavlan from 1535.

== Demolition ==
Stockholm city walls served their purpose for many centuries. No foreign or domestic forces succeeded in pushing Stockholm's defensive walls. The Danes, under Christian II of Denmark, were able to invade Stockholm on 7 September 1520 due to the city capitulation after the a series of blockades and intense pressure. The city's protected location on an island meant that it was difficult to be taken. Hostile attacks on Norreport and Söderport failed. Olaus Magnus wrote: "The Stockholm ports incurred Danish kings greater costs accrued in the unsuccessful assault trial than the ten largest cities in their own kingdom."

During Gustav Vasa a national defense task was organized and the enemy would meet far outside the capital. He led in 1540 the construction of Vaxholm as a barrier against hostile fleets, while he turned the Gripsholm Castle and Uppsala Castle into real fortifications.

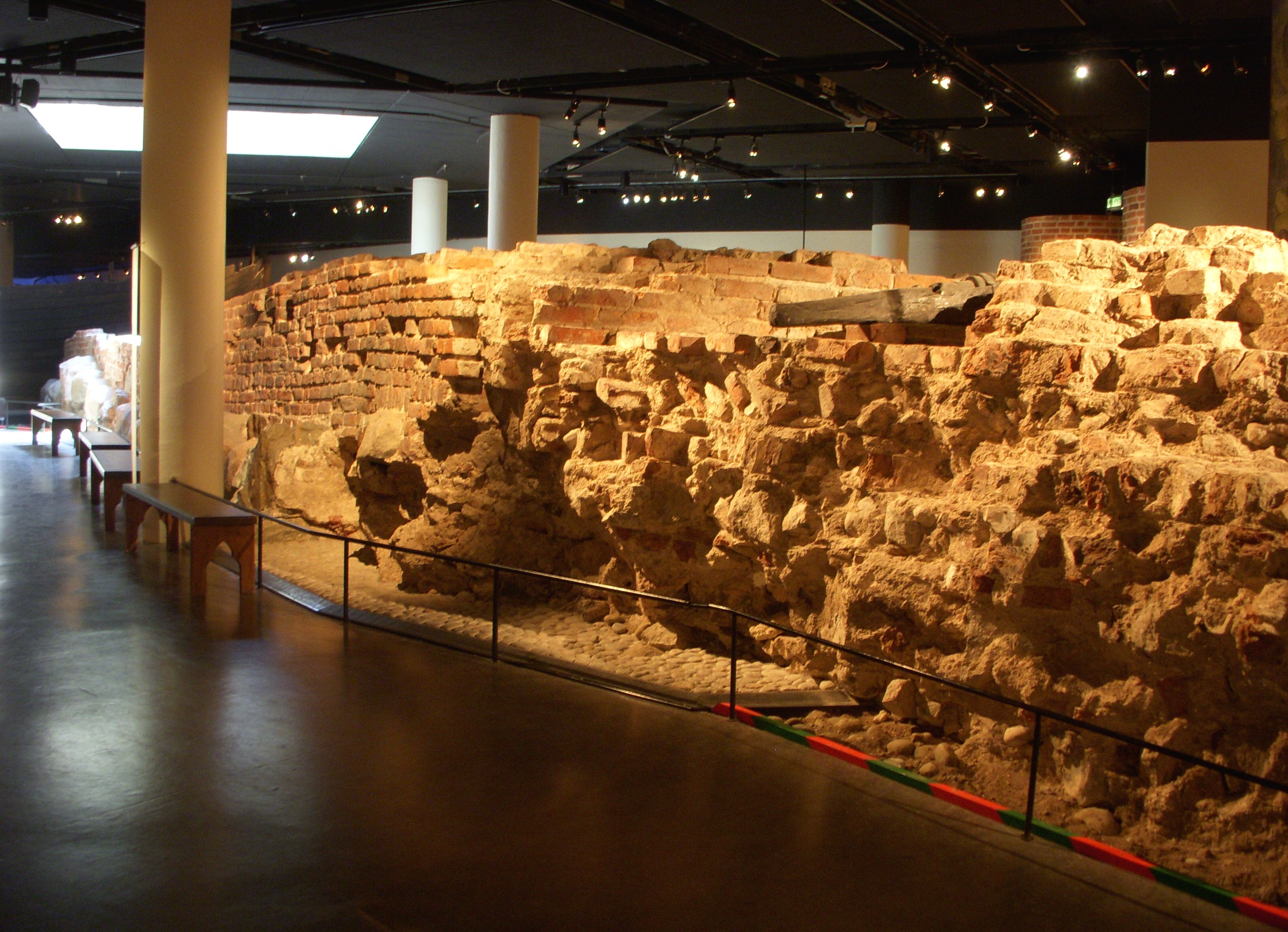
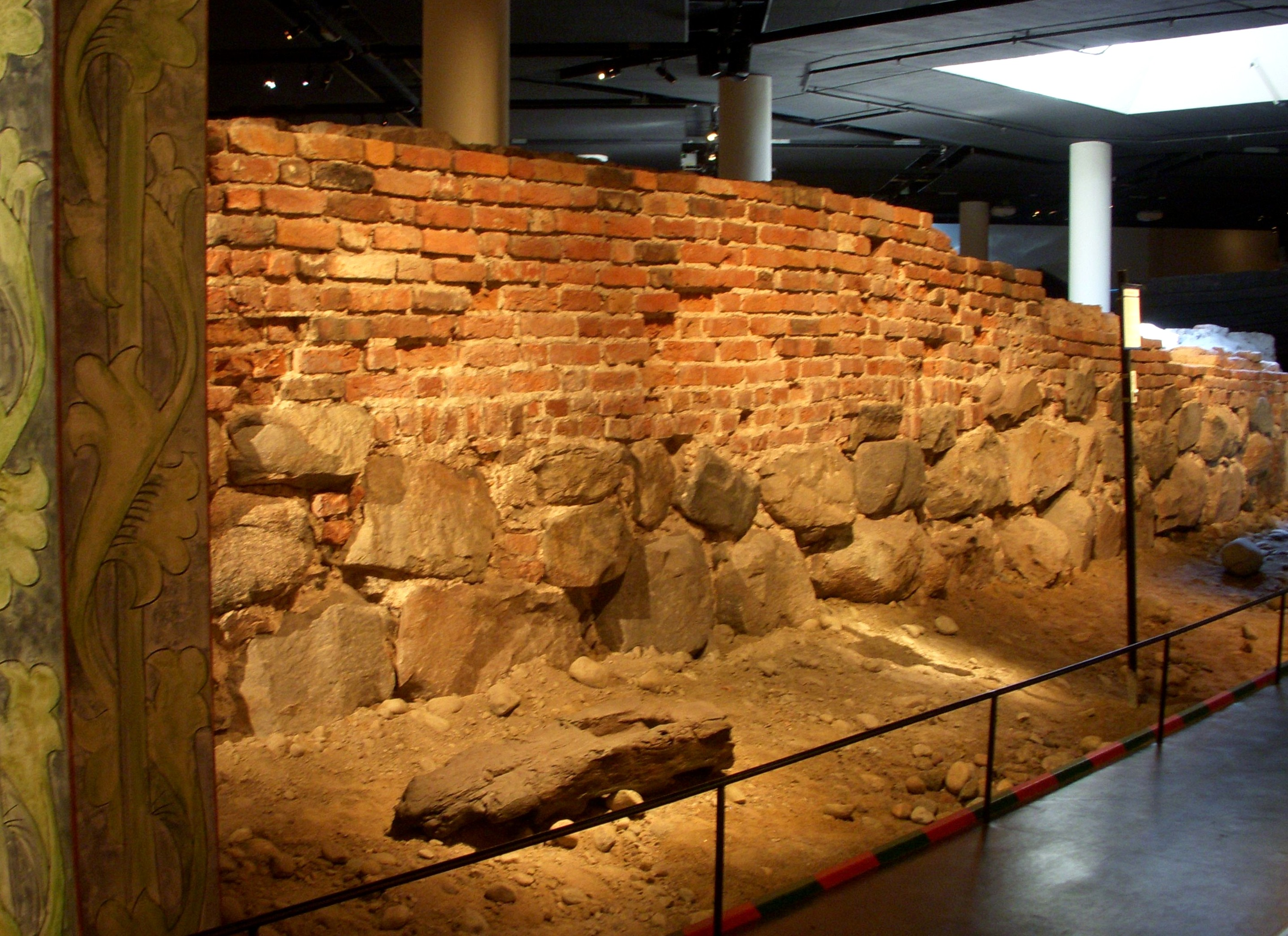
The northern part of the city wall, preserved in the Museum of Medieval Stockholm.

During Gustav II Adolf's reign the transformation of the town from medieval to a modern European metropolis began. The city engaged in trade and shipping, and there was no invasion threat anymore. The city wall had had its day and it prevented even the city's expansion.

The Mälarmuren was first described in 1630. In 1625 there was a fire disaster, called "stora vådelden" or the big wildfire, which wiped out the southwestern part of Stadsholmen and it was the start of the demolition of the city wall and its towers for Stockholm's first major street marketing. Saltsjömuren disappeared during the 1600s. The material was used both as building material for new houses and edifications, especially along the east side where the newly acquired land of Stockholm to the east was built: Skeppsbron. The demolition of the Stockholm young city wall was carried out so thoroughly that today it cannot be seen anywhere above ground level in Gamla stan.

== See also ==
- Stockholm's permanent defence

== Sources ==
- Högberg, Stefan (1981). New York history, part 1. Stockholm: Bonnier Facts. ISBN 91-34-42950-6.
- Dahlbäck, Goran (1995). In medieval Stockholm. Monographs published by the Stockholm Municipal Administration, Nr. 81. ISBN 91-7031-051-3.
- Ahnlund, Henrik (1961). On medieval St. John's Church in Stockholm. Stockholm: Society of St. Erik. OCLC 185713003.
- Hans Hansson (1956–1976). Stockholm's city walls. Monographs published by the Stockholm Municipal Administration, Nr. 18. ISBN 91-38-72177-5.
