= Kastellet, Stockholm =

Swedish citadel

Coordinates: 59°19′21.5″N 18°05′25″E

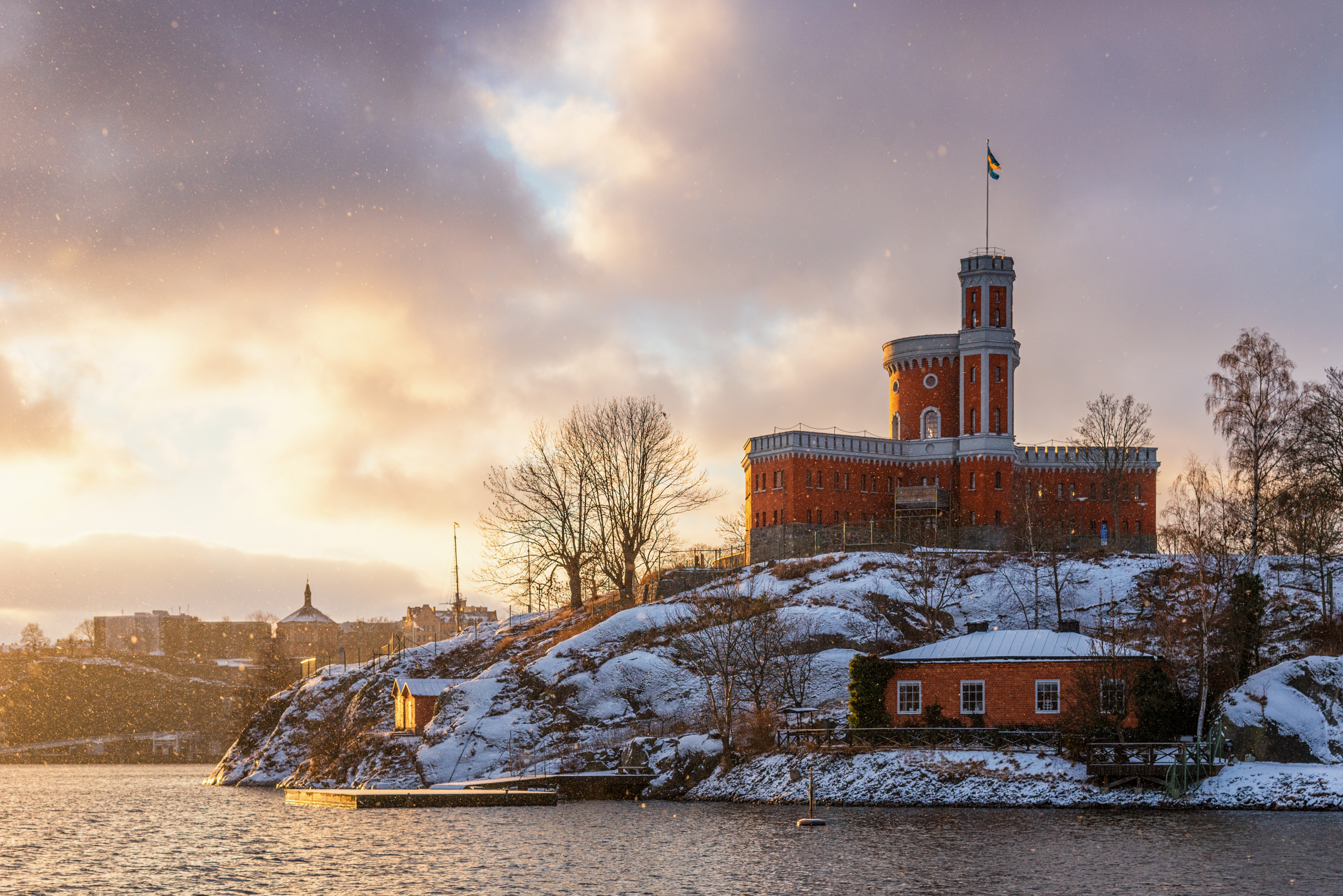
Kastellet, 2016

Kastellet is a small citadel located on the islet Kastellholmen in central Stockholm, Sweden.

== History ==
The first fortification on the location was built in 1667 designed by Governor-general and Field marshal Erik Dahlbergh (1625–1703). In 1676, Dahlbergh was made director-general of fortifications for the Realm of Sweden. After the fleet moved to Karlskrona in 1680, the castle fell into disrepair

Kastellet exploded in June 1845 and subsequently was built 1846–1848 to the design of military officer and architect Fredrik Blom (1781–1853). It consists of a round tower with red brick walls and a 20-meter-high (66 ft) stair tower.

The castle regained its defensive function during World War II when it became part of Stockholm's permanent air defense. The tower and battery plane were then equipped with fast-firing anti-aircraft guns. The Swedish Coastal Artillery training school departed Kastellet in 1990. On the top of the Kastellet, the Military Ensign of Sweden is hoisted and lowered every day, indicating the nation is at peace. On May 17, 1996, the Norwegian Constitution Day, some Norwegian expats temporarily raised the Norwegian flag in the tower.

== See also ==
- Architecture of Stockholm
- History of Stockholm
- Skeppsholmen
