= Russian Pillage of 1719–1721 =

Russian raids on the Swedish coast

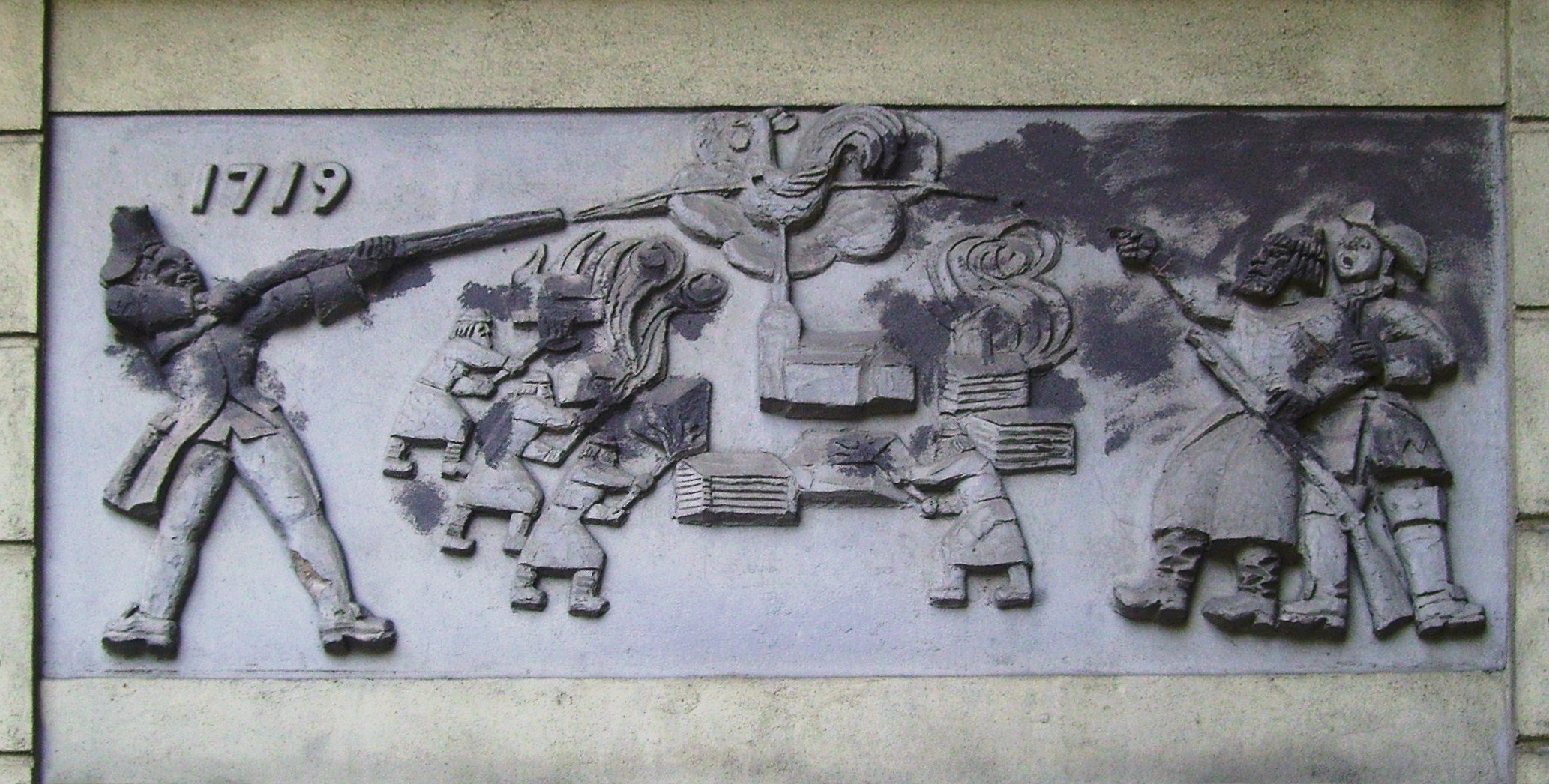
Relief depicting the Russian atrocities in 1719, on the façade of a hotel in Södertälje

Russian Pillage of Nyköping 1719

The Russian Pillage (Swedish: rysshärjningarna), is the name for the action of the Imperial Russian Fleet toward the Swedish civilian population along the Swedish east coast, as well as expeditions and the raids of single unit in the inland, during the finishing years of the Great Northern War in 1719–1721.

The purpose was to pillage, sack, and burn to force the Swedish regime to concessions during the peace negotiations on Åland. The Swedish representative, Georg Heinrich von Görtz, was at the time stalling the negotiations in hope of military support from the second Stanhope–Sunderland ministry in England. Peter the Great, on the other hand, wished for a swift end to the war, which would make it possible for him to focus on inner reform.

== History ==
In the summer of 1719, a Russian fleet consisting of 132 galleys and several smaller boats, totaling 26,000 men, assaulted Stockholm archipelago. The Russian fleet pillaged along the coast of Uppland almost as far north as Gävle, and the coast of Södermanland as far south as Norrköping.

The archipelago was severely devastated by the assaults. On several of the larger islands, almost all buildings were burnt down.

The entire city of Trosa was burnt to the ground, save for the city church and bell tower. After receiving reinforcements, the Russian fleet attempted to attack Stockholm but were defeated on 12 August 1719.

In 1720, Russian troops razed Umeå, and in 1721 the cities of Hudiksvall, Sundsvall, Söderhamn, Härnösand and Piteå.

The Russian forces were stopped after a Swedish counterattack at the Battle of Grengam (Swedish: Slaget vid Ledsund) of which 43 of the total 61 galleons were destroyed. This resulted in the Swedish east coast being saved. Similar encounters were repeated until the peace of Treaty of Nystad.

== See also ==
- Great Wrath, Russian occupation of Finland in 1713–1721
