= Birger jarls torn =

Defensive tower in Gamla Stan, Sweden (c. 1530)

Coordinates: 59°19′33.3″N 18°03′42″E

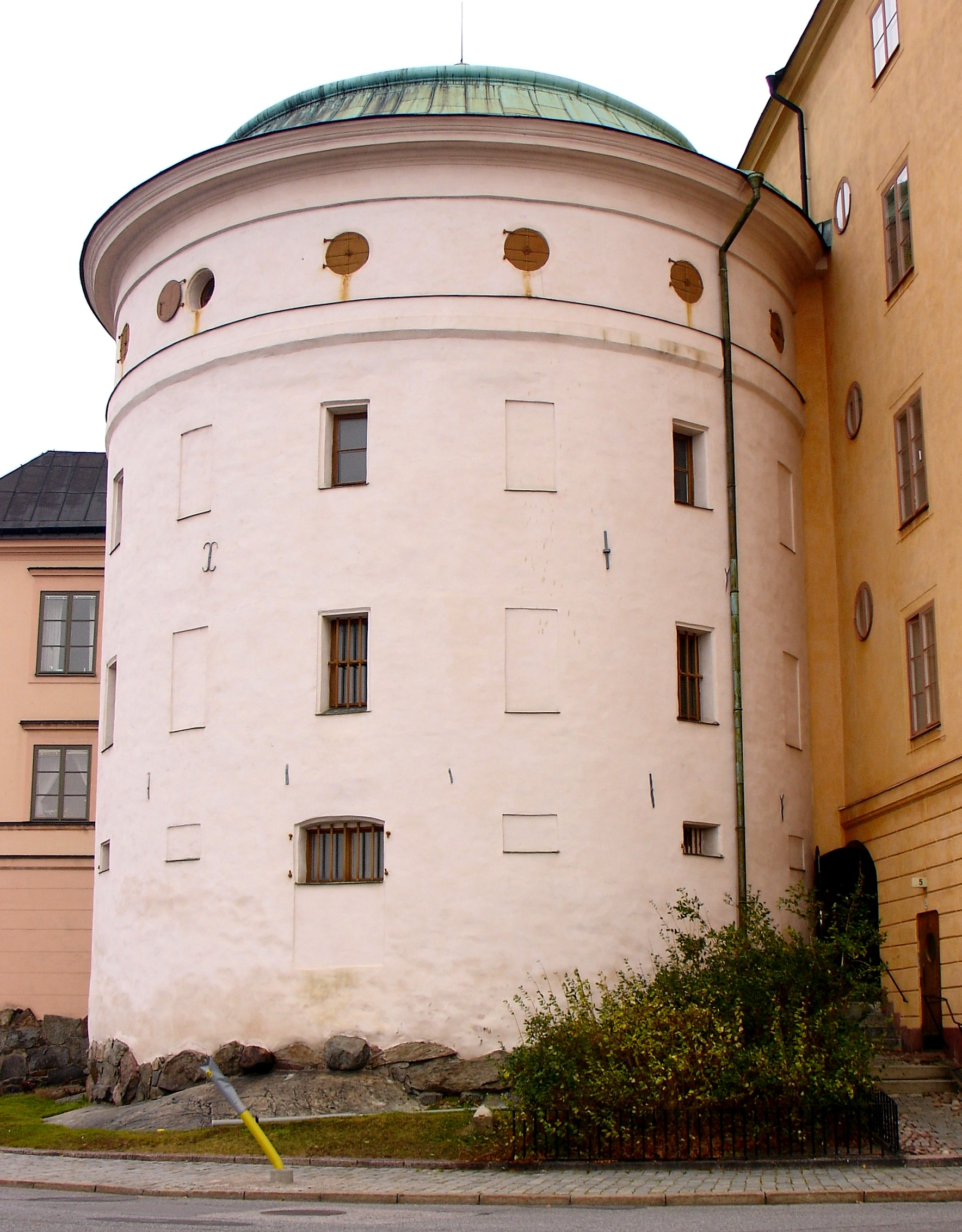
Birger jarls torn. The roof and shutters are from the 18th century. Parts of the wall of the first three floors are from the 1520–1530s.

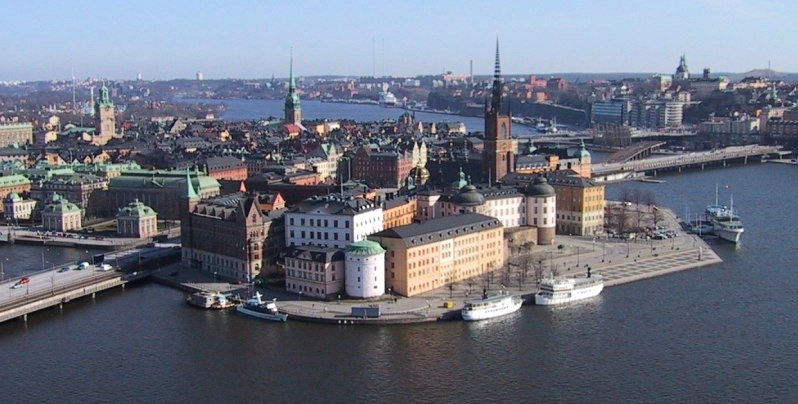
View of Riddarholmen from the Stockholm City Hall centred on Birger jarls torn

Birger jarls torn (Swedish for Birger Jarl's Tower) is a defensive tower on the northwest corner of Riddarholmen, an islet in Gamla Stan, the old town of Stockholm.

The building has been named for Birger Jarl who traditionally is attributed as the founder of Stockholm, but it was built several hundred years later and the name is mostly the product of a 17th-century myth. Stockholm literally translates to "Log-Islet", and according to that myth the city was founded where a log drifting ashore from Lake Mälar.

== History ==
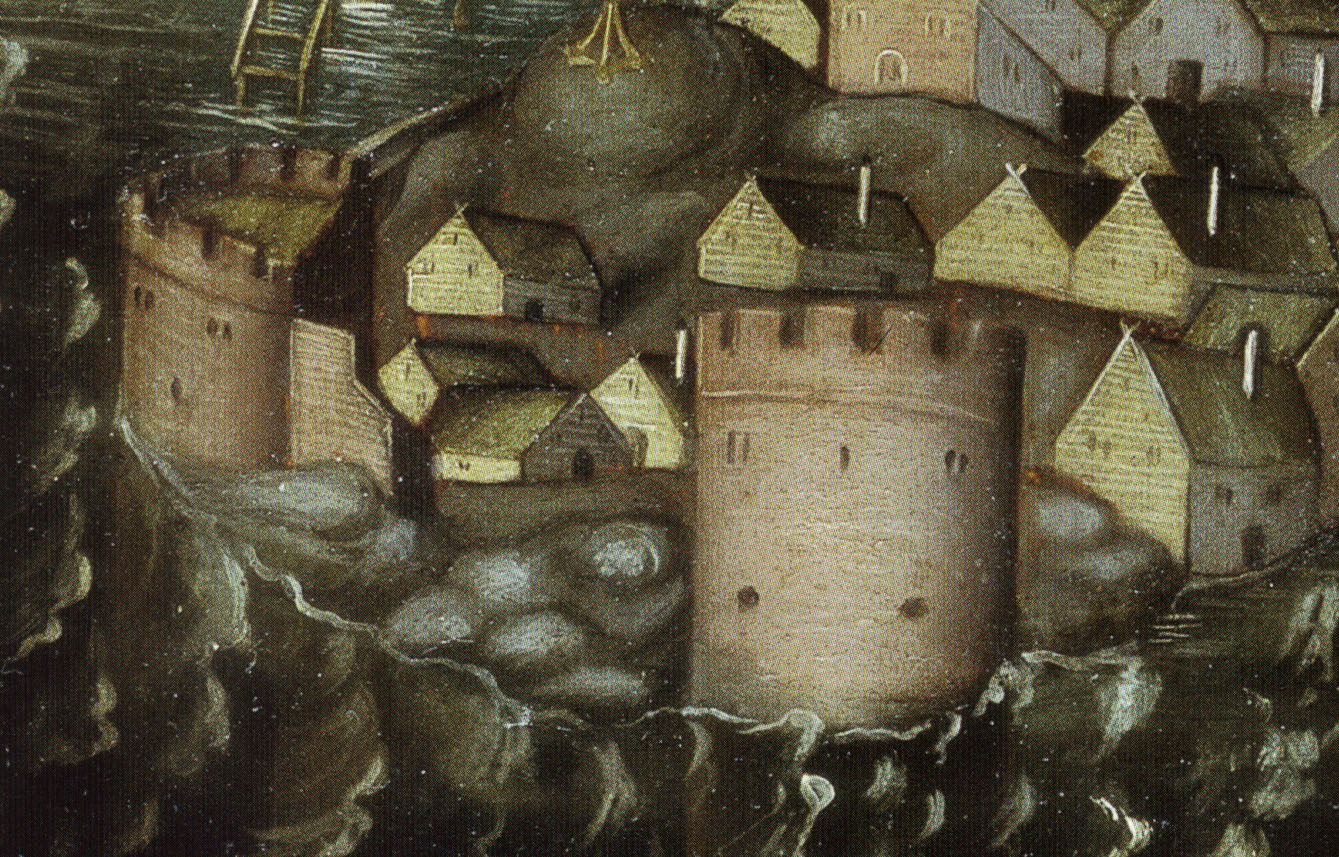
Detail from Vädersolstavlan (original from 1535) showing Birger jarls torn (left) and Vasatornet (right)

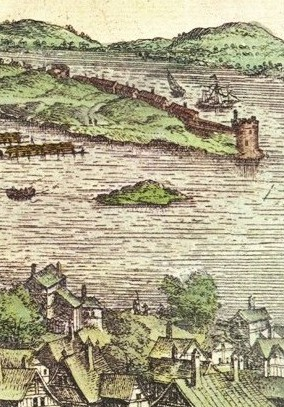
Tower of Birger Jarl seen in a detail of an engraving from the 1580s

Often mentioned as the oldest building in town, the tower in fact was built by King Gustav I of Sweden around 1530 in his efforts to reinforce and modernize the fortifications of the capital. It replaced timbered redoubts destroyed by fire in 1525 and along with the southern tower of the Wrangel Palace, is the only remaining structure from a 16th-century defensive system. Originally, a wall connected the two towers.

For its construction, bricks were taken from St. Clare's Priory (Sankta Klara kloster near today's Sergels torg) when it was destroyed in 1527, and from churches on the ridges surrounding the city. The building was originally two stories high with a crenellated top. Toward the waterfront, the base of the cavity wall was made very thick, almost 2.5 metres (8 ft 2 in) at the base and about 0.75 centimetres (0.30 in) at the top, while the other side was considerably thinner with much larger openings. In 1589–1590, the original crenellation was rebuilt into a third floor topped by a cone shaped roof, and the present white grouting was added to the façade.

In the 1620s King Gustavus Adolphus begun to donate parcels of land on Riddarholmen to prominent members of the Swedish nobility, and the islet was gradually transformed into the palace laden location it still is. From the mid 17th century the tower, at the time called Rundelen ("the round tower"), was gradually attached more and more to surrounding buildings. It was thoroughly rebuilt in the mid-18th century, the original apertures then transformed into windows, while a fourth floor was added, topped by a new roof with a gilt sphere. Along with two flanking buildings, the 18th century restoration has been assumed to be designed by Carl Hårleman. During the 19th century both the tower and the two flanking buildings were rebuilt many times to accommodate various activities and institutions such as a pawn shop and the city's archives. In the 1950s, the entire complex was completely rebuilt again with new concrete joints replacing old wooden ones, while new barred windows and a detached spiral staircase were added.

Before housing the offices of the Chancellor of Justice in 2007, the building was carefully documented and restored in 2006. Some of the more recent additions were removed while some older, discontinued alterations were reinstated. All new additions were carefully adapted to the existing structure to emphasise its historical value, while making room for modern installations and accessibility requirements. The entire top floor has been transformed into a round conference room with an oval desk surrounded by the round windows. As of 2007, the lower part of the building is intended to house restaurant business, to reduce the isolated state of the islet Riddarholmen and make it more attractive to Stockholmers.

== See also ==
- Architecture of Stockholm
- History of Stockholm
