= Wrench =

Tool used to provide grip and mechanical advantage

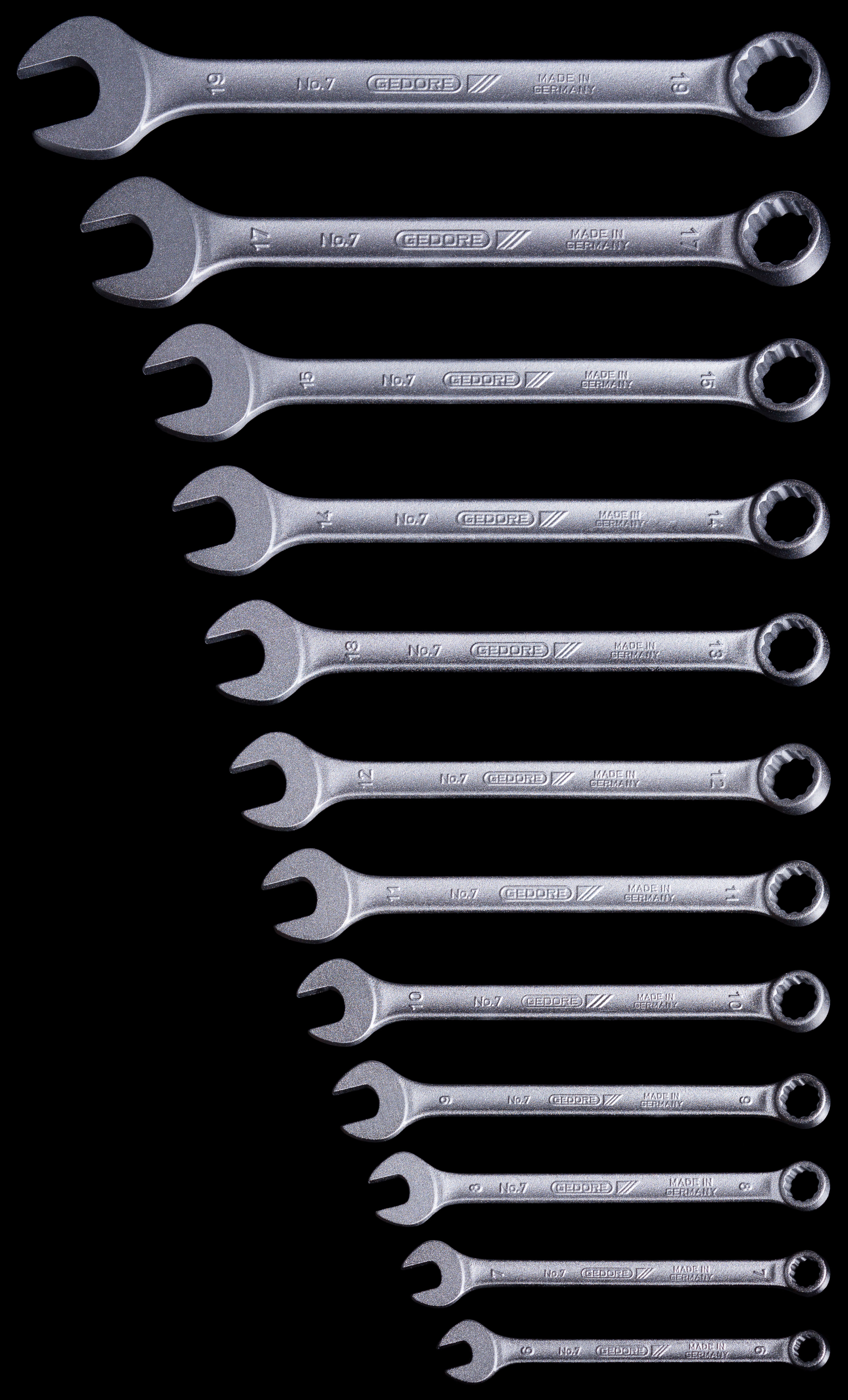
A set of metric spanners or wrenches, open at one end and box/ring at the other. These are commonly known as “combination” spanners.

A wrench or spanner is a tool used to provide grip and mechanical advantage in applying torque to turn objects—usually rotary fasteners, such as nuts and bolts—or keep them from turning.

In the UK, Ireland, Australia, and New Zealand, spanner is the standard term. The most common shapes are called open-ended spanner and ring spanner. The term wrench is generally used for tools that turn non-fastening devices (e.g. tap wrench and pipe wrench), or may be used for a monkey wrench—an adjustable pipe wrench.

In North American English, wrench is the standard term. The most common shapes are called open-end wrench and box-end wrench. In American English, spanner refers to a specialized wrench with a series of pins or tabs around the circumference. (These pins or tabs fit into the holes or notches cut into the object to be turned). In American commerce, such a wrench may be called a spanner wrench to distinguish it from the British sense of spanner.

Higher quality wrenches are typically made from chromium-vanadium alloy tool steels and are often drop-forged. They are frequently chrome-plated to resist corrosion and for ease of cleaning.

Hinged tools, such as pliers or tongs, are not generally considered wrenches in English, but exceptions are the plumber wrench (pipe wrench in British English) and Mole wrench (sometimes Mole grips in British English).

The word can also be used in slang to describe an unexpected obstacle, for example, "He threw a spanner in the works" (in U.S. English, "monkey wrench").

== Etymology ==
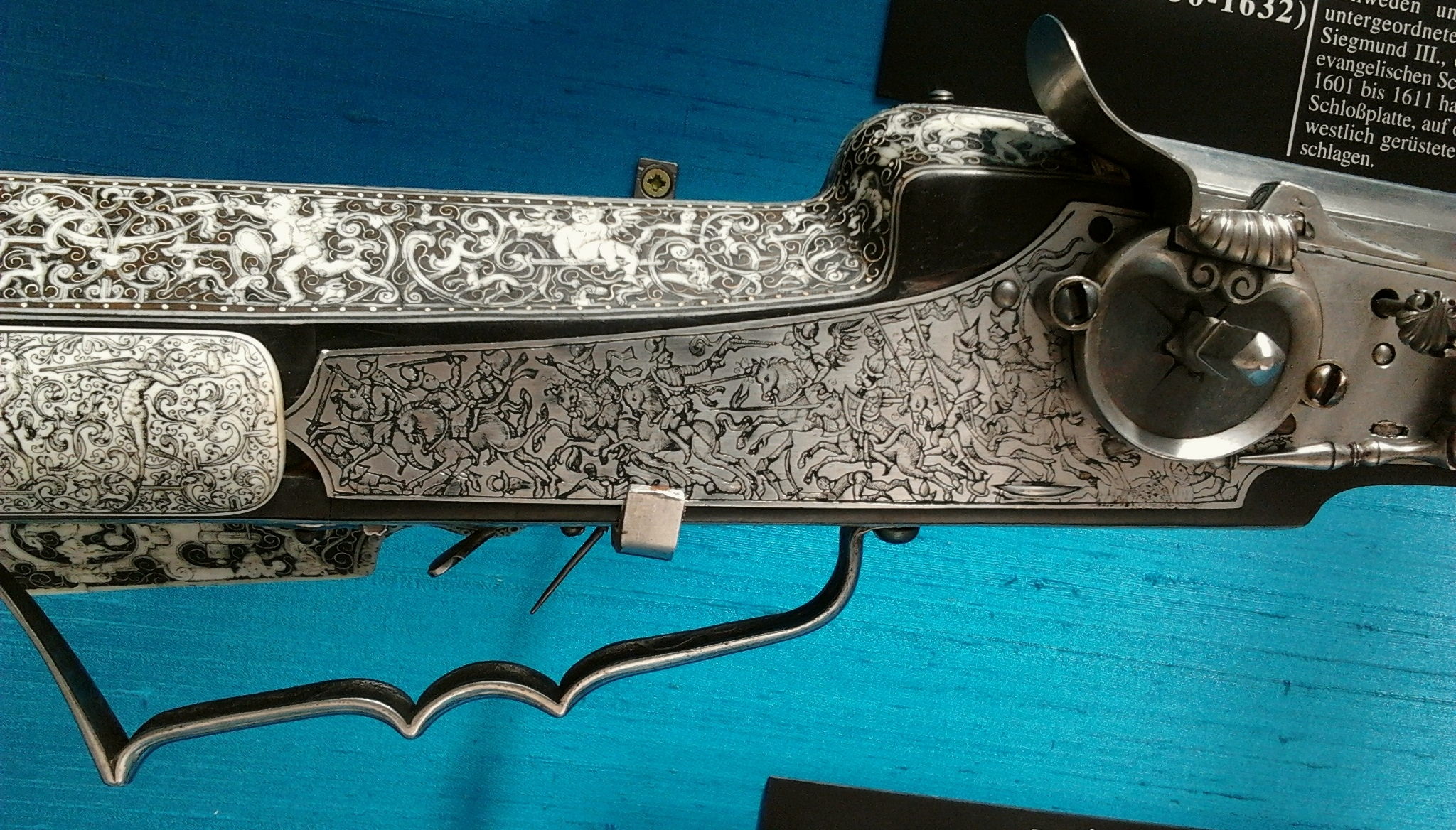
Wheel-lock gun of Sigismund III Vasa: The original spanner had a square hole for turning the shaft (r.) of the wheel, which tensioned the mainspring. See also § External links.

'Wrench' is derived from Middle English wrench, from Old English wrenċ, from Proto-Germanic *wrankiz ("a turning, twisting"). The oldest recorded use dates to 1794.

'Spanner' came into use in the 1630s, referring to the tool for winding the spring of a wheel-lock firearm. From German Spanner (n.), from spannen (v.) ("to join, fasten, extend, connect"), from Proto-Germanic *spannan, from PIE root *(s)pen- ("to draw, stretch, spin").

== History ==
Wrenches and applications using wrenches or devices that needed wrenches, such as pipe clamps and suits of armor, have been noted by historians as far back as the 15th century. Adjustable coach wrenches for the odd-sized nuts of wagon wheels were manufactured in England and exported to North America in the late eighteenth and early nineteenth centuries. The mid 19th century began to see patented wrenches that used a screw for narrowing and widening the jaws, including patented monkey wrenches.

Most box end wrenches are sold as '12-point' because 12-point wrenches fit over both 12-point and 6-point bolts. 12-point wrenches also offer a higher number of engagement points over six-point. However, 12-point wrenches have been known to cause round-off damage to 6-point bolts as they provide less contact space.

== Types ==
Image	American name	British name	Description	Group
	open-end wrench	open-ended spanner	A one-piece wrench with a U-shaped opening that grips two opposite faces of the bolt or nut. This wrench is often double-ended, with a different-sized opening at each end. The ends are generally oriented at an angle of around 15 degrees to the axis of the handle; it allows a greater range of movement in enclosed spaces by flipping the wrench.	common
	box-end wrench	ring spanner	A one-piece wrench with an enclosed opening that grips the faces of the bolt or nut. The recess is generally a six-point or twelve-point opening for use with nuts or bolt heads with a hexagonal shape. The twelve-point fits onto the fastening at twice as many angles, an advantage where swing is limited. Eight-point wrenches are also made for square-shaped nuts and bolt heads. Ring spanners are often double-ended and usually with offset handles to improve access to the nut or bolt.	common
	combination wrench	combination spanner open-ring spanner	A double-ended tool with one end being like an open-end wrench or open-ended spanner, and the other end being like a box-end wrench or ring spanner. Both ends generally fit the same size of bolt.	common
	flare-nut wrench tube wrench line wrench	flare spanner flare nut spanner brake spanner crow's-foot spanner	A wrench that is used for gripping the nuts on the ends of tubes. It is similar to a box-end wrench but, instead of encircling the nut completely, it has a narrow opening just wide enough to allow the wrench to fit over the tube, and thick jaws to increase the contact area with the nut. It allows for maximum contact on plumbing nuts, which are typically softer metals and therefore more prone to damage from open-ended wrenches.	common
	ratcheting box wrench	ratcheting ring spanner	A type of ring spanner, or box wrench, whose end section ratchets. Ratcheting can be reversed by flipping over the wrench, or by activating a reversing lever on the wrench. This type of wrench combines the compact design of a box wrench, with the utility and quickness of use of a ratchet wrench. A variety of ratcheting mechanisms are used, from simple pawls to more complex captured rollers, with the latter being more compact and smoother, but also more expensive to manufacture. The one pictured also features a drift pin on the tail.	common
	flex-head socket wrench Saltus wrench	swivel head spanner	Similar in concept to a socket wrench. A Saltus wrench features a socket permanently affixed to a handle. Sockets are not interchangeable as with a socket wrench. The socket often rotates around the handle to allow the user to access a fastener from a variety of angles. Commonly a Saltus wrench is part of a double-ended wrench, with an open-end type head on the opposite side from the socket head.	common
	spanner wrench or simply spanner [referring to any of these]; [when specifying pin vs hook vs C, the same terms are used as in British English]	pin spanner hook spanner C spanner pin face spanner	A wrench with one or several pins or hooks, designed to drive spanner head screws, threaded collars and retainer rings, shafts, and so on. Note the difference in the American and British senses of the word "spanner". In American English, "spanners" are a subset of the class of tools called "wrenches".	common
	striking face box wrench slammer wrench slugger wrench hammer wrench	slogging spanner flogging spanner	A specialized thick, short, stocky wrench with a block end to the handle specifically designed for use with a hammer, enabling one to impart great force. Used commonly with large fasteners, especially a nut and stud which both have index marks: the nut is screwed hand-tight, then further tightened with the striking wrench a known number of index marks calculated from the elasticity of the bolt or stud, thus giving precise torque (preload). Striking wrenches also provide shock and high force used to release large and/or stuck nuts and bolts; and when space does not allow room for a large wrench.	common
	adjustable wrench adjustable end wrench Crescent wrench	adjustable spanner shifting spanner wrench	The most common type of adjustable wrench in use today. The adjustable end wrench differs from the monkey wrench in that the gripping faces of the jaws are displaced to a (typically) 15 degree angle relative to the tool's handle, a design feature that facilitates the wrench's use in close quarters. The modern adjustable end wrench was invented by Johan Petter Johansson of Bahco. The common use of "Crescent wrench" to describe this design is derived from the Crescent brand, owned by Apex Brands, Inc. Apex Tool Group, LLC.	adjustable
Self-adjusting wrench	self-adjusting wrench	self-adjusting spanner	With a serrated jaw which is self-tightening.	adjustable
	monkey wrench	gas grips King Dick	An old type of adjustable wrench with a straight handle and smooth jaws whose gripping faces are perpendicular to the handle.	historical
	pipe wrench monkey wrench	Stillson wrench Stillsons; Pipe wrench	A tool that is similar in design and appearance to a monkey wrench, but with self-tightening properties and hardened, serrated jaws that securely grip soft iron pipe and pipe fittings. Sometimes known by the original patent holder's brand name as a "Stillson wrench".	adjustable
	Locking pliers Vise-Grips	Mole grip Mole wrench	A tool that is similar in purpose to a monkey wrench but with adjustable quick release jaws in many styles such as needle-nose pliers, wrenches, clamps and various shapes that can also be used to hold workpieces in place for welding or drilling. In British English known generically by its brand name Mole Wrench	adjustable
	socket wrench	socket wrench socket spanner	A closed cylinder that fits over one end of a nut or bolt head. It may include a handle, if it does not then it is often just referred to as a socket and is usually used with various drive tools to make it a wrench or spanner such as a ratchet handle, a tee bar (sliding tommy bar) bar or a knuckle bar (single axis pivot). It generally has a six-point, eight-point or twelve-point recess, may be shallow or deep, and may have a built-in universal joint.	socket
	L-angle socket wrench		For turning a hexagonal nut or bolt when there is not room for a normal socket wrench. Usually the long branch is used for applying torque on the short branch. The short branch often has a hole for a bolt or stud to go through it while the hexagonal socket turns the nut.	socket
	clamp ratchet wrench	clamp ratchet spanner	An open-ended multi-size ratchet wrench. The ratcheting mechanism allows the nut to be clamped on or loosened with a reciprocating motion; flip the wrench to change the direction of the drive. The wrench takes the advantage of the clamp action to allow multiple sizes in both SAE and metric standards. Each wrench typically will allow up to 3 non-metric sizes and 3 metric sizes.	adjustable
	breaker bar break-over handle	knuckle bar jointed nut spinner flex head nut spinner Power Bar	This tool is a long non-ratcheting bar that allows the user to impart considerable torque to fasteners, especially in cases where corrosion has resulted in a difficult-to-loosen part.	socket
	crowfoot wrench crow's-foot wrench	crow's foot	A type of wrench designed to use the same drive sizes as socket wrenches, but non-cylindrical in shape. The ends are the same as those found on the open-end, box-end, or the flare-nut wrenches. These wrenches are used when torque must be measured, or when the application precludes the use of a regular socket or wrench. Also used in place of conventional open/box wrenches where the wrenches are large, usually at a lower cost, or for when space and weight restrictions are critical.	socket
	ratchet wrench	ratchet handle	It contains a one-way mechanism that allows the socket to be turned without removing it from the nut or bolt simply by cycling the handle backward and forward. (The photo shows both ratchet and sockets.)	socket
	speed handle speed wrench	speed handle crank handle speed brace leg winder (in the context of caravans)	A crank-shaped handle that drives a socket. The socket-driving analog of the brace used to drive a drill bit. Used instead of a ratchet in a few contexts when it can save substantial time and effort—that is, when there is a lot of turning to be done (many fasteners), ample room to swing the handle, ample access to the fastener heads, etc. Has less leverage than a conventional ratchet wrench. Used occasionally in automotive repair or job shop work.	socket
	torque wrench	torque wrench	A socket wrench drive tool that is employed to impart a precise amount of torque to a fastener, essential in many cases during the assembly of precision mechanisms.	socket
	Allen wrench Allen key hex key L wrench	Allen key	A wrench used to turn screw or bolt heads designed with a hexagonal socket (recess) to receive the wrench. The wrenches come in two common forms: L-shaped and T-handles. The L-shaped wrenches are formed from hexagonal wire stock, while the T-handles are the same hex wire stock with a metal or plastic handle attached to the end. There are also indexable-driver-bits that can be used in indexable screwdrivers.	keys
	Bristol wrench Bristol spline wrench	?	Another wrench designed for internal socket-head screws and bolts. The cross-section resembles a square-toothed gear. Not a common design, it is chiefly used on small set screws.	keys
	Torx wrench	Torx key	An internal socket-head screw design. The cross-section resembles a star. Commonly used in automobiles, automated equipment, and computer components as it is resistant to wrench cam-out and so suitable for use in the types of powered tools used in production-line assembly.	keys
	alligator wrench	?	A formerly common type of wrench that was popular with mechanics, factory workers, and farmers for maintenance, repair and operations tasks in the days when fasteners often had square rather than hex heads. The wrench's shape suggests the open mouth of an alligator.	historical
	cone wrench	cone spanner	A thin open-end wrench used to fit narrow wrench flats of adjustable bearing bicycle hubs. Called a "cone" wrench because it fits wrench flats of the cone section of a "cup and cone" hub, this tool is also used with some other adjustable hub bearings. The wrench is very thin so has little strength; to compensate, cone wrenches typically have a large head. Most bicycle front hubs use a 13 mm; most rears use 15 mm. Similar designs are used for bicycle pedals	specialty
	die-stock die wrench	die stock die holder	A double-handled wrench for turning the dies used in threading operations (cutting the male threads such as on a bolt).	specialty
	drum key lug wrench drum wrench	drum key	A small, square-head socket wrench used on drum (percussion musical instrument) tuning lugs and fasteners. This key is often interchangeable with radiator bleed keys.	specialty
	tube wrench	shower valve socket wrench tubular box wrench box spanner	A tube with six-sided sockets on both ends, turned with a short length of rod (tommy bar or T bar) inserted through two holes in the middle of the tube. The length of the tube can accommodate long shafts such as with tap/faucet fixings. Double-ended versions (pictured left) are most common, catering for two hex sizes. Spark plug spanners are often of this type.	common
	drum wrench bung wrench	?	A tool commonly used to open bungs on large 55-gallon drums (cylindrical containers).	specialty
	fire hydrant wrench (hose connection)	?	The hose connection has a threaded collar with a protruding pin. From the handle of the wrench an arc has at its end a loop to engage the pin.	specialty
Fire Hydrant Key	fire hydrant wrench (valve operator)	?	A pentagonal (five-sided) box wrench. The unusual shape of the lug makes the valve tamper-resistant: with the opposite faces nonparallel, unauthorized opening of the hydrant is more difficult without a suitable tool.	specialty
Curb key	curb key	Toby key	A wrench for opening and closing valves on municipal water pipes (often at the curb [kerb], hence the name). The valve usually has a rectangular lug and is set deep into the ground, requiring the key.	specialty
	golf shoe spike wrench	?	A T-handle wrench with two pins and clearance for the spike—allows removal and insertion of spikes in shoes.	specialty
	head nut wrench	?	A flat wrench with a circular hole and two inward protruding pins to engage slots in the nut. This type of nut is used on bicycles to secure the front fork pivot bearing to the headpiece of the frame.	specialty
	4-way lug wrench wheel lug cross wrench cross rim wrench spider wrench	wheel brace tyre spanner	A socket wrench used to turn lug nuts on automobile wheels.	specialty
	plumber wrench	multigrips multigrip pliers	A tool to screw (rotate with force) various pipes during plumbing.	specialty
	rigger-jigger	rigger-jigger	An offset 10mm/13mm spanner used in attaching riggers to rowing boats to allow users to keep grip when flush with boat, originally designed by Henri Tengvall for Sons of the Thames Rowing Club in 1991.	specialty
	basin wrench sink wrench	basin wrench	A self-tightening wrench mounted at the end of a shaft with a transverse handle at the opposite end. Used to tighten or loosen fasteners located in recesses.	specialty
	dogbone wrench	dumbbell spanner	A compact spanner for multiple sizes, historically used as a cheap DIY tool for bicycles when they used nuts or bolts, rather than the more modern allen bolt fittings	specialty
	spoke wrench	nipple wrench spoke key	A wrench with a clearance slot for a wire wheel spoke such as on a bicycle wheel and a drive head for the adjustment nipple nut. The handle is offset to make the wrench more convenient to grip, and the handle is short to fit between spokes, allowing the wrench to turn 360 degrees without being removed.	specialty
	spud wrench	podging spanner podger	A steel erecting tool which consists of a normal wrench at one end and a tapered drift pin at the other, used for lining up bolt holes, typically when mating two structural steel beams, or the flanges on two segments of steel pipe.	specialty
	chain whip	chain whip	A self-tightening wrench that engages the teeth of a chain drive sprocket, and used typically to remove bicycle cogsets. Similar to a strap wrench, but uses positive engagement rather than friction, and so needs to grab only one end of the chain.	specialty
	strap wrench oil-filter wrench chain wrench	strap wrench oil filter wrench chain wrench	A self-tightening wrench with either a chain or strap of metal, leather, or rubber attached to a handle, used to grip and turn smooth cylindrical objects (such as automotive oil filters). It relies entirely on friction between the strap or chain and the object to be manipulated. Similar to a pipe wrench, but uses a chain similar to a drive chain or strap, instead of an adjustable jaw. The links of the chain have extended pegs which fit into grooves in the front of the handle, with one end of the chain attached permanently to the handle. It is used in situations where pipe wrenches cannot maintain a proper grip on an object such as a wet or oily pipe. Larger versions of chain wrenches are sometimes known as "bull tongs" and are used with large diameter pipe such as is used deep wells.	specialty
	tap wrench tap handle T-handle	tap wrench	A double-handled wrench for turning the square drive on taps used in threading operations (cutting the female threads such as within a nut) or a precision reamer.	specialty
	tappet wrench	?	A spanner of small to moderate size constructed similarly to an open-ended wrench, but with a thinner cross-section. Its purpose is to apply torque to the fasteners found on the valve trains of older engines, especially automobile engines, where the valve train required adjustment of the tappets (also known as lifters). Tappets, push rods, rocker arms and similar adjustable pieces are often equipped with locknuts which are thinner than standard nuts, due to space limitations. Frequently, the hex section of the adjustment is contiguous to the lock nut, thus requiring a thinner "tappet wrench" to be used.	specialty
	tuning wrench	tuning "T" hammer piano tuning lever	A socket wrench used to tune some stringed musical instruments. Similar, and in some cases identical to drum tuning keys, but often provide greater torque due to the higher tension of strings.	specialty
	wing nut wrench		A tool specifically for use with wing nuts, allowing the application of greater torque than is possible by hand. It is generally advised not to use such spanners for tightening the wing nut, but rather only for loosening. It is a "hand saver" more than anything else.	specialty
	graduated wrench	?	An adjustable wrench with a small number (usually 2–4) of discrete sizes. It is sometimes used as an inexpensive substitute for a monkey wrench.	
	power wrench	?	A broad type of wrenches that use electricity or compressed air to power the wrench.	power
	impact wrench impact driver	garage air gun pneumatic spanner windy spanner rattle gun impact driver Windy gun	A powered wrench that delivers quick, repeated impulses of torque. Typically powered by air, but can also be electric. Like other wrenches which deliver a large amount of torque, impact wrenches can be useful for loosening stubborn, difficult-to-remove nuts and bolts. Misuse, however, can over-torque and damage the threads on lug nuts and wheel studs. This risk is one of the reasons they are often found in professional auto repair shops, but not among do-it-yourselfers’ tools. They are closely associated with auto repair shops, as the source of the iconic “rap-rap-rap” sound often heard there.	power

== Other types of keys ==
These types of keys are not emically classified as wrenches by English speakers, but they are etically similar in function to wrenches.

American name	British name	Description	Group
chuck key	chuck key	A key used to tighten or loosen a chuck.	household/industrial
church key, church key bottle opener	church key, bottle opener	A key used to remove bottle caps or to pierce can lids.	household
paint can key	paint can opener	A key used to open the lids of paint cans. Its upturned edge helps to apply a levering motion to the crimped lip of the can lid.	household
sillcock key	sillcock key, loose key, tap key	A key used to open or close sillcock valves. Many are designed the same way as a spider-type lug wrench, with four common sizes (one on each end) built into one portable tool.	household
window crank	window crank	A socket-like key slipped over the splined shaft that operates the opening and closing of some types of window.	household
sardine can key	sardine tin key	A key used in opening the lids of canned fish or canned meat. A tab on the metal lid fits into the slot in the shaft of the key and the lid is wound onto the key, tearing it away from the can.	household
dental key	dental key	A key formerly used in dentistry for leverage in pulling teeth	historical

== See also ==
- List of screw drives
- Width across flats
