= Pipe wrench =

Wrench for assembling and disassembling piping made of threaded pipes

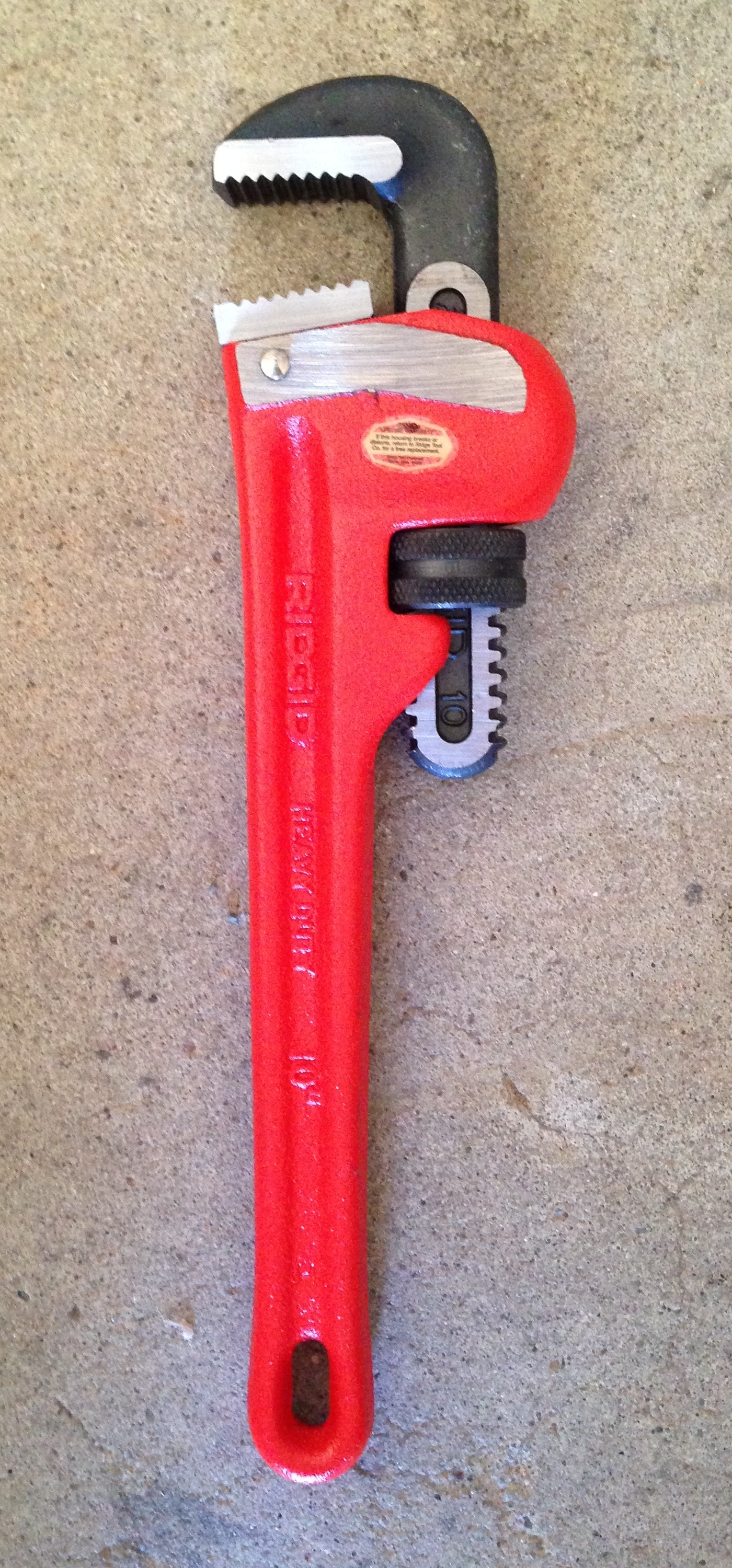
- A modern pipe wrench
- Classification: hand tool
- Related: wrench, plumber wrench, monkey wrench

A pipe wrench is any of several types of wrench that are designed to turn threaded pipe and pipe fittings for assembly (tightening) or disassembly (loosening). The Stillson wrench, or Stillson-pattern wrench, is the usual form of pipe wrench, especially in the US. The Stillson name is that of the original patent holder, who licensed the design to a number of manufacturers; the patent has since expired. A different type of wrench with compound leverage often used on pipes, the plumber wrench, is also called a "pipe wrench" in some places.

== Description ==
The Stillson wrench is an adjustable wrench (spanner) with hardened serrated teeth on its jaws. The hard teeth bite into the softer metal of the round pipe and provide the grip needed to turn a pipe, even against fair resistance. The design of the adjustable jaw, which permits a certain amount of intentional play out of square, allows it to bind on the pipe, with forward pressure on the handle pulling the jaws tighter. On some models, two leaf springs, above and below the knurled adjusting knob, help unlock the jaw when pressure on the handle of the wrench is released.

Pipe wrenches are not intended for regular use on hex nuts or other fittings. However, if a hex nut becomes rounded (stripped) so that it cannot be moved by standard wrenches, a pipe wrench can be used to free the bolt or nut, because the pipe wrench is designed to bite into rounded metal surfaces.

Pipe wrenches are classified by the length of the handle. They are generally available in sizes from 6 inches (150 mm) to 48 inches (1,200 mm) or larger. They are usually made of forged steel. Today, aluminium might be substituted to reduce the weight of the body of the wrench, although the teeth and jaw remain steel. Teeth and jaw kits (which also contain adjustment rings and springs) can be bought to repair broken wrenches.

== History ==
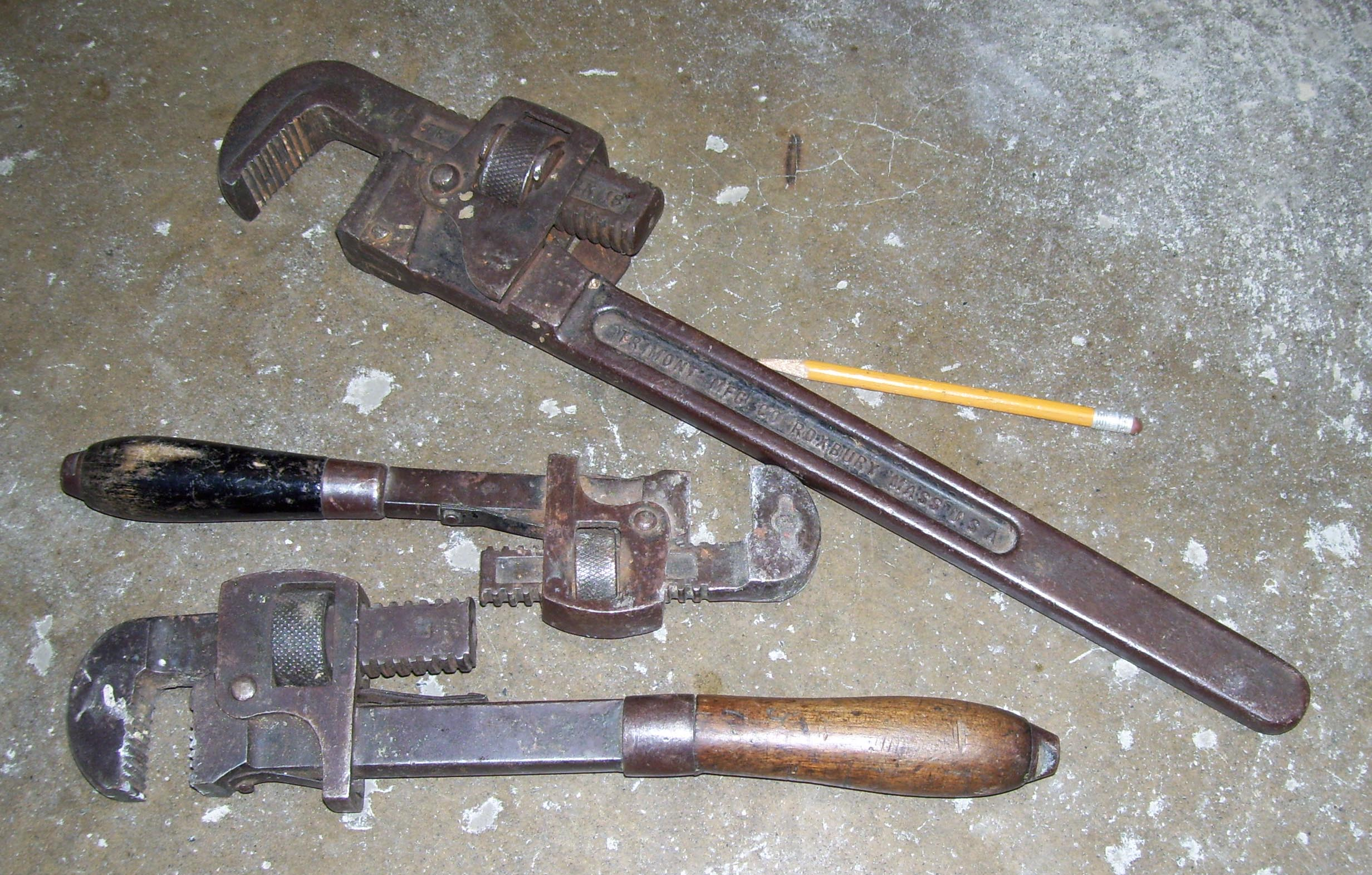
Three old “Stillson-pattern” wrenches (with pencil in photo to show scale)

Daniel C. Stillson (1826–1899), a mechanic at the Walworth Company, in Cambridge, Massachusetts, created the first such wrench. On October 12, 1869, US patent #95,744 was issued to Stillson.

On 17 August 1888, the Swedish inventor Johan Petter Johansson (1853–1943) took out his first patent on the adjustable pipe wrench. The Swedish Patent Office issued the patent again in 1894. The idea emerged after he established his company Enköpings Mekaniska Verkstad. Back then, nut dimensions were poorly standardized, so each time a tradesman was out on a job, he needed a trolley to take a set of fixed pipe wrenches with him. Johansson's tool could grip nuts of different dimensions.

== Pipe wrench in different countries ==
In South Africa, the terms "bobbejaan spanner" and "baboon spanner" are commonly used, especially for large pipe wrenches. Bobbejaan is the Afrikaans term for a baboon.

In Spain and Morocco, they are called grifa.

In Mexico they are known and called "stillson" without even using the word llave ("wrench").

In Turkey they are known as "English Keys".

== See also ==
- Adjustable wrench – a straight-jawed adjustable wrench with jaws in line with its handle
- Monkey wrench – a straight-jawed adjustable wrench similar to a pipe wrench and often confused with it
- Nipple wrench (plumbing) – a pipe wrench that grabs the interior of a pipe, rather than the exterior
- Plumber wrench – a wrench used for turning pipes and tightening hex nuts
