= Strap wrench =

A strap wrench is any of various types of wrench that grip an object via a strap or chain being pulled in tension around it until it firmly grips. High static friction keeps it from slipping.

Many strap wrenches have built-in handles. Others are made to receive the square drive of a ratchet wrench.

The strap or chain can have various forms. Some straps are made of polymers, and are smooth, highly flexible, non-marring, high-friction straps. (Before the era of commercial polymers, the straps were of leather or rubber.) Other straps are bands of spring steel, moderately flexible, slightly firmer and more likely to mar than the polymer variants. The chains tend to be of the roller chain type (like a bicycle chain).

== Types ==
=== Oil-filter wrenches ===
Many oil-filter wrenches are actually strap wrenches. Others are of the socket type or the pliers type.

=== Chain whips (e.g., for bicycle work) ===
A chain whip is a tool used to tighten and loosen threaded sprockets on a bicycle. It is called a chain whip because it has a short section of chain used to grip the sprocket. An alternative method to tighten sprockets is the rotafix method, which uses no tools.

=== Piston-ring compressors ===
Piston-ring compressors are strap wrenches that evenly squeeze (compress) the piston rings around a piston long enough to slide it into a cylinder. They look a lot like an oil-filter wrench of the strap type (except they are a flat piece of metal that wraps around the piston). If no wrench is available, an old piston ring snapped into two halves can be used to compress each of the new rings as the piston is inserted.

== Gallery ==
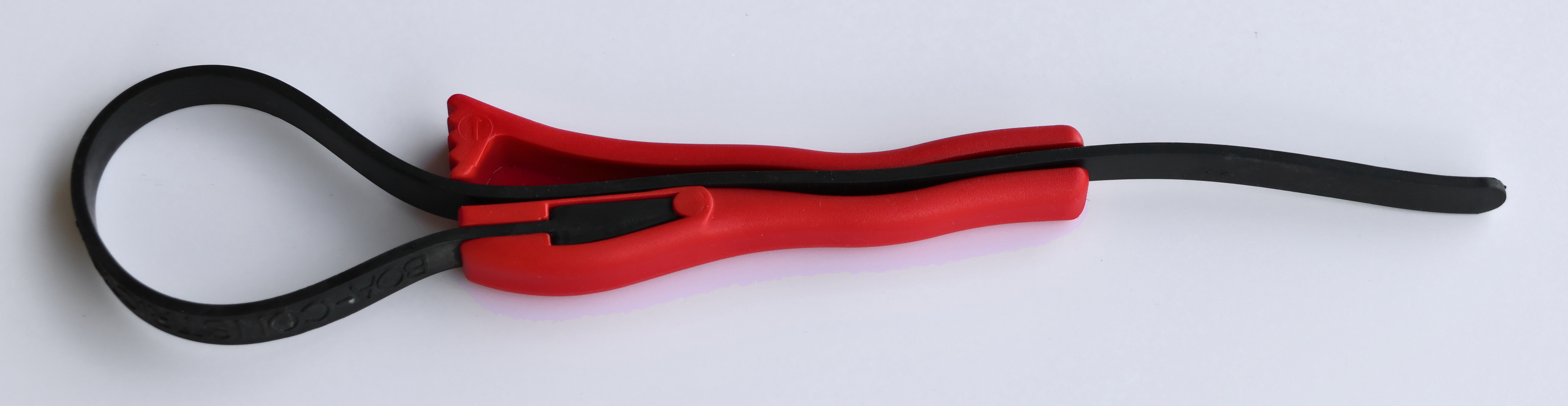
A strap wrench variant.

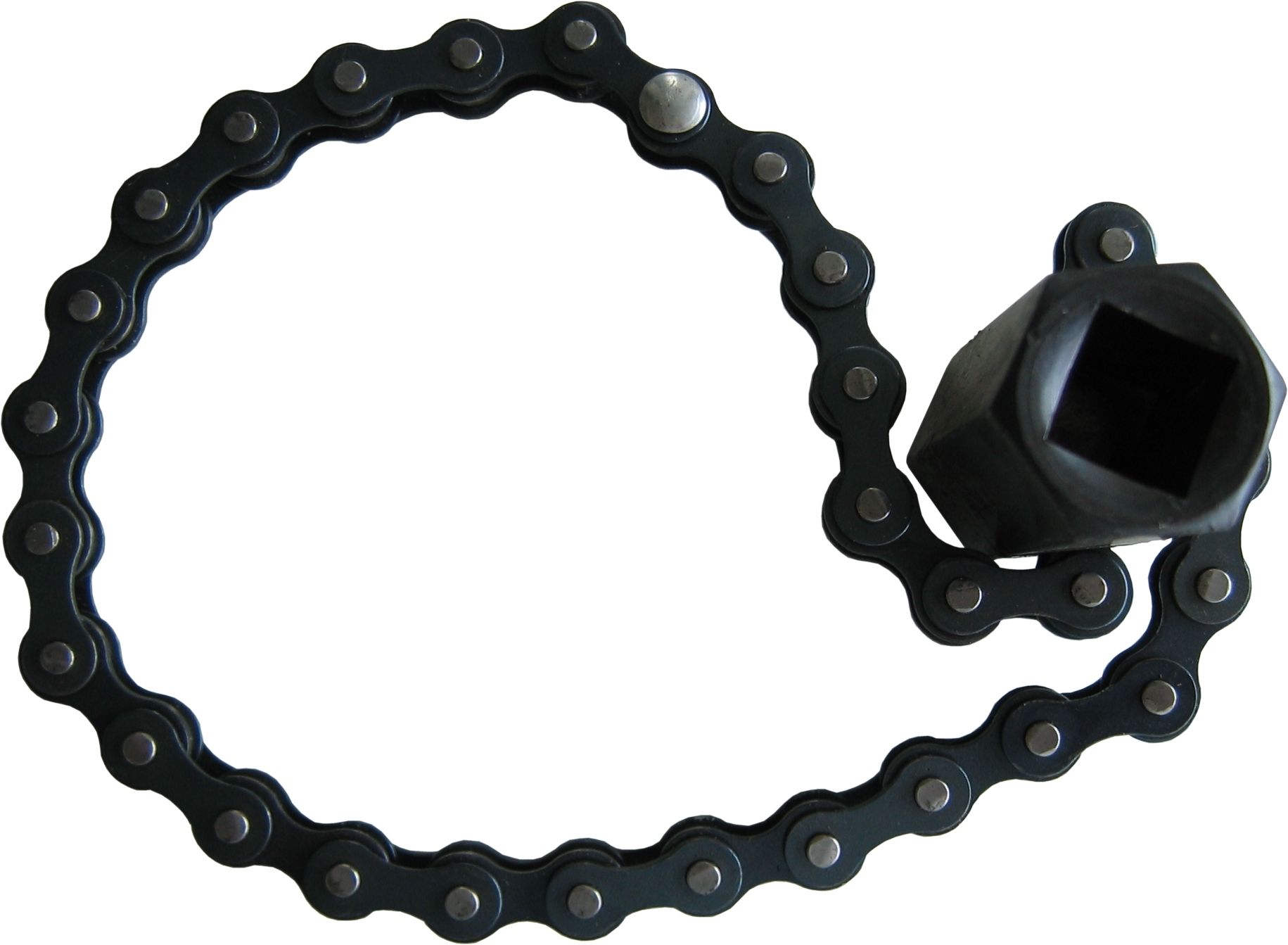
A strap wrench variant (one form of oil filter wrench).

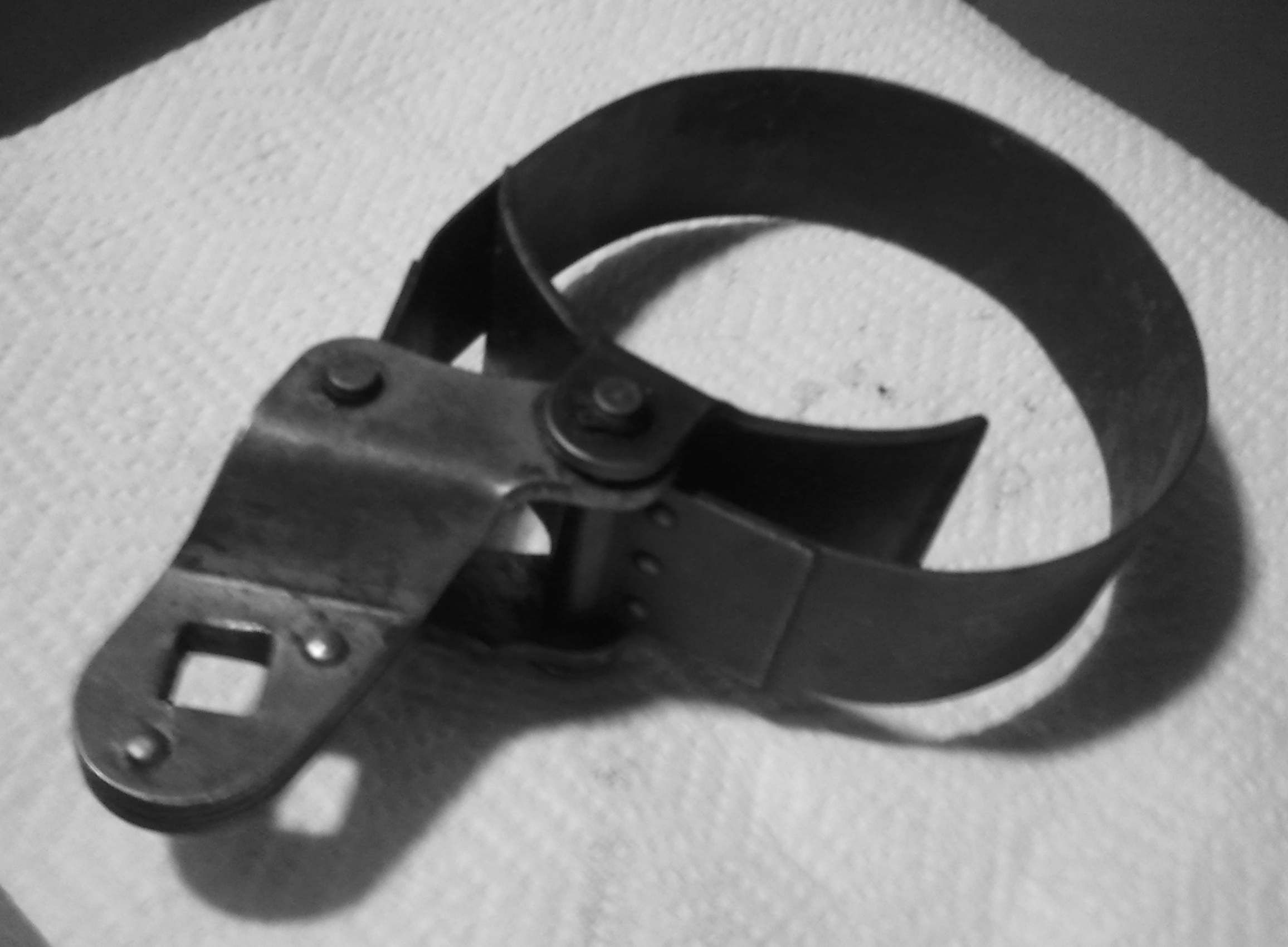
A strap wrench variant (one form of oil filter wrench).

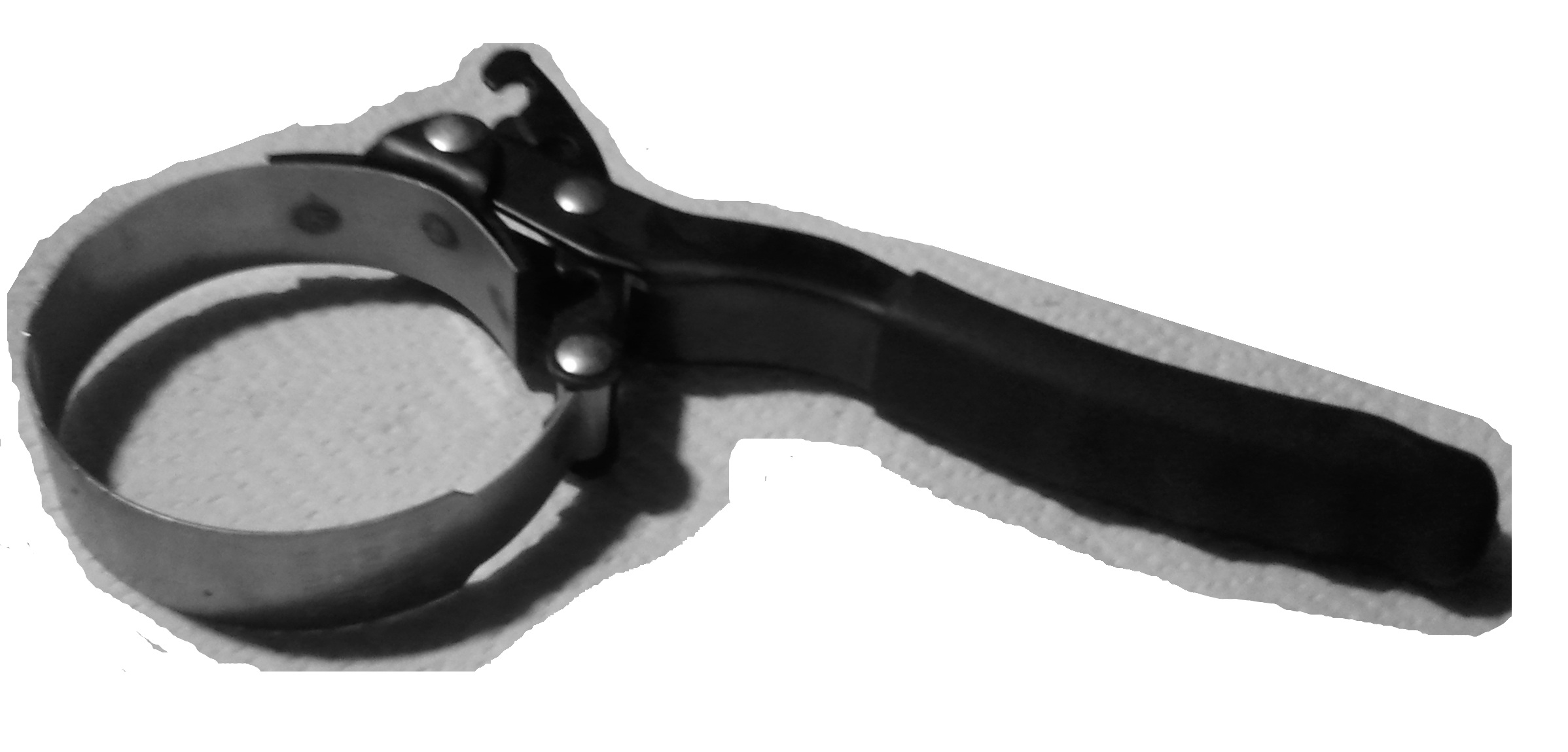
A strap wrench variant (one form of oil filter wrench).

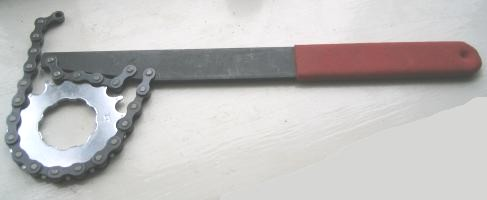
A chain whip tool, wrapped around a sprocket.
