= Rotafix =

The rotafix is a method of tightening or loosening a sprocket on a track bike or fixed gear bicycle.

== Method ==
The rotafix enables the securing of a sprocket ("cog") to a track hub without the use of a chain whip.

The chain is removed from the chainring and rests around the bottom bracket shell and on the sprocket with the rear wheel in the horizontal track ends. The chain is folded over itself such that the bottom half of the chain is trapped between the sprocket and the upper half. The sprocket is then prevented from turning because the chain is wrapped around the bottom bracket. It is essential to take steps to protect the paintwork on the bottom bracket shell from damage by the chain.

The sprocket is then tightened onto the hub by turning the wheel backwards until it is too tight to turn any more. This method can tighten the sprocket to very high torque because of high mechanical advantage created by the wheel. Professional mechanics also refer to this method as "frame whipping", as there is no need to utilize a chain whip.

Removing the sprocket is done by reversing the chain fold so that it is on the bottom and turning the wheel forwards so that the sprocket turns counterclockwise. This is called the reverse rotafix.
