= Basin wrench =

Plumbing tool

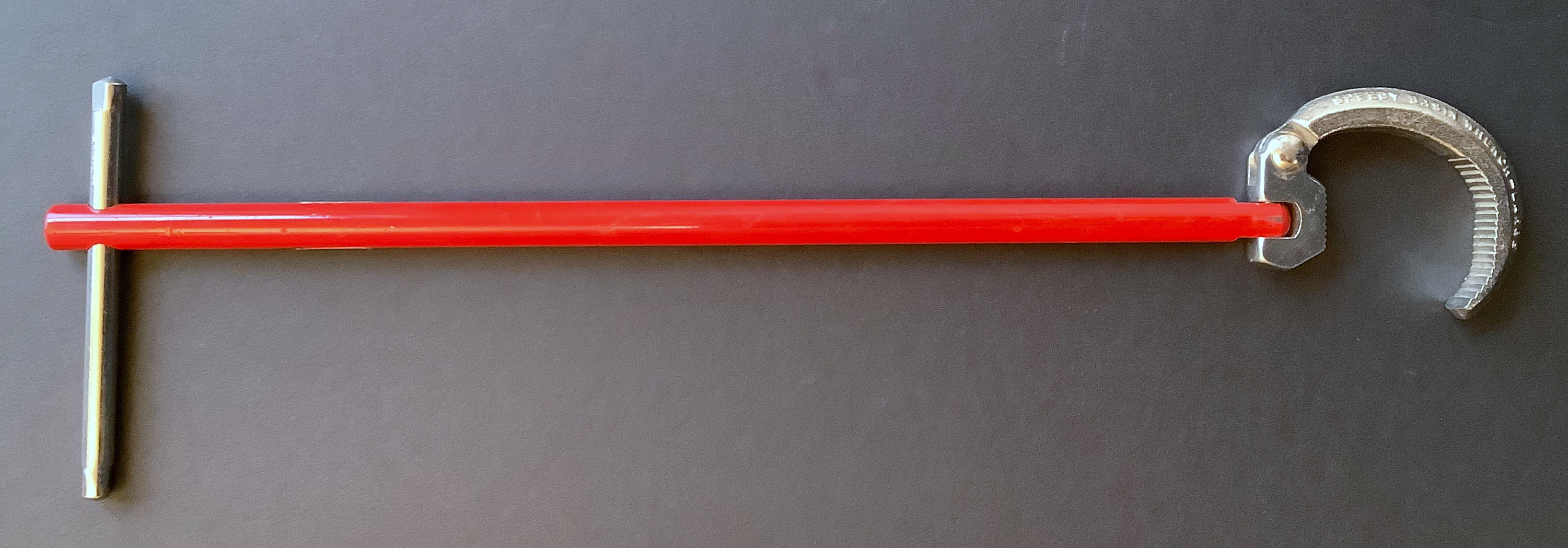
A large basin wrench

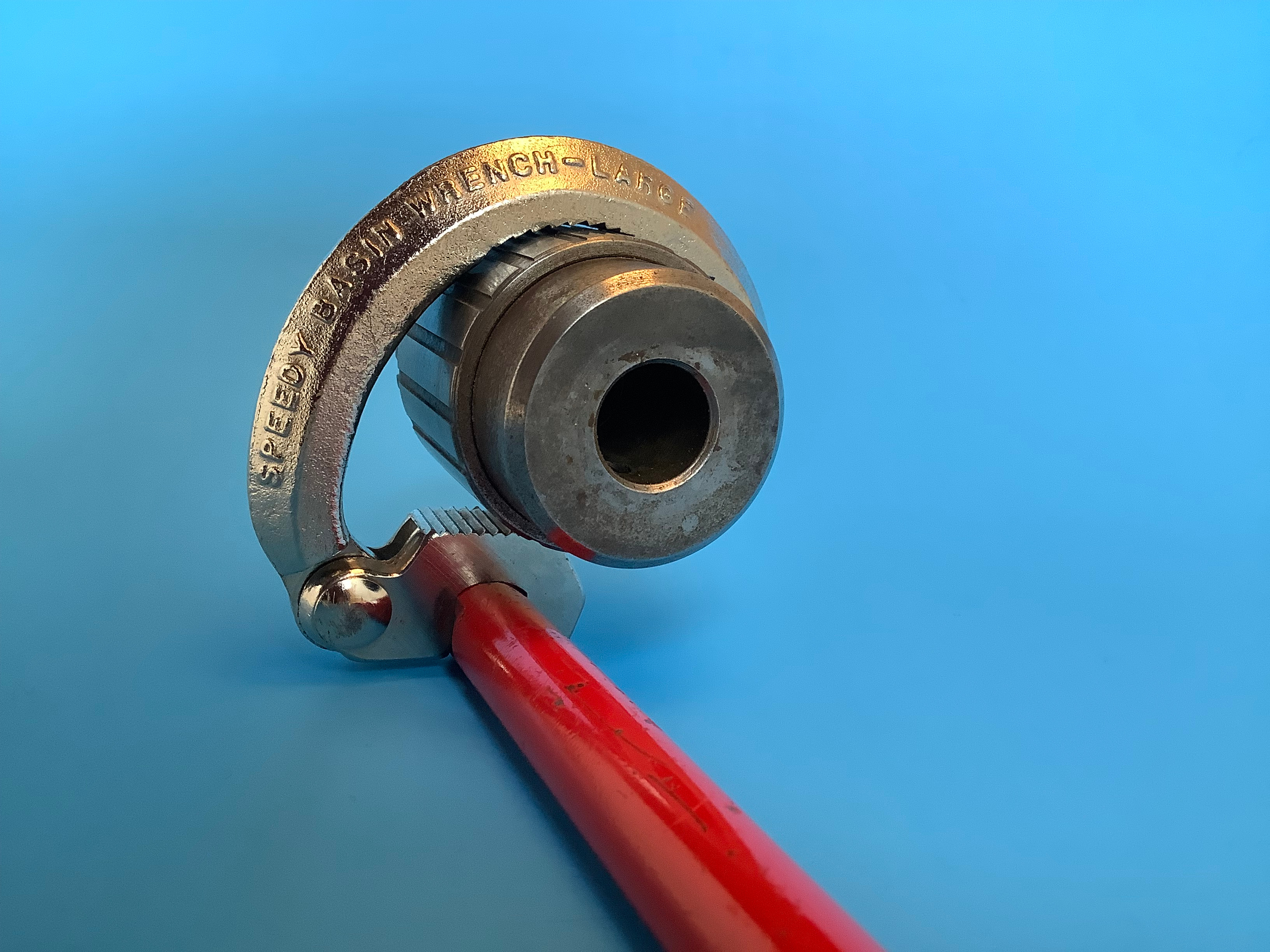
Large basin wrench, with jaws oriented to apply torque in counter-clockwise direction

A basin wrench, sometimes called a sink wrench, is a plumbing tool which is used in confined spaces to turn fasteners and pipes that would be difficult or impossible to reach with a plumber wrench or other types of wrenches. For example, the threaded nuts used to secure faucets to sinks are often located in deeply recessed places that can only be accessed with a basin wrench.

== Construction and operation ==
A basin wrench consists of a long shaft with a pair of asymmetrical jaws at one end and a transverse handle at the other end. The two jaws form an assembly in which the jaws are joined with a pivot pin. One of the jaws is fixed relative to the shaft, and the other is curved. In some basin wrenches, the curved jaw is spring-loaded relative to the fixed jaw so that it will automatically close and grip the object to be turned. When the shaft is rotated in the direction that causes the curved jaw to trail the pivot pin, the jaws will increase their grip on the object as shaft torque increases, thereby allowing the operator to apply torque to the fastener without slippage. The transverse handle passes through a loosely fitting hole in the shaft so that it can be shifted to conform to tight spaces or elongated to increase leverage.

The fixed jaw is attached to the shaft with a pivot pin so that the entire jaw assembly can rotate about an axis perpendicular to the shaft. This permits the jaw assembly to be rotated over the end of the shaft so that the jaws can be oriented to allow the tool to apply torque in either a clockwise or counter-clockwise direction. Mechanical stops limit this rotation to 180° so that when the jaw assembly is resting at a stop, the jaws will be perpendicular to the shaft and thus aligned to the object. When the shaft is held in a vertical orientation, the jaws are automatically held against the stop by gravity. Basin wrenches are available with both fixed-length and telescopic shafts.
