= Drift pin =

Tool used for localizing a hammer blow

drift pin

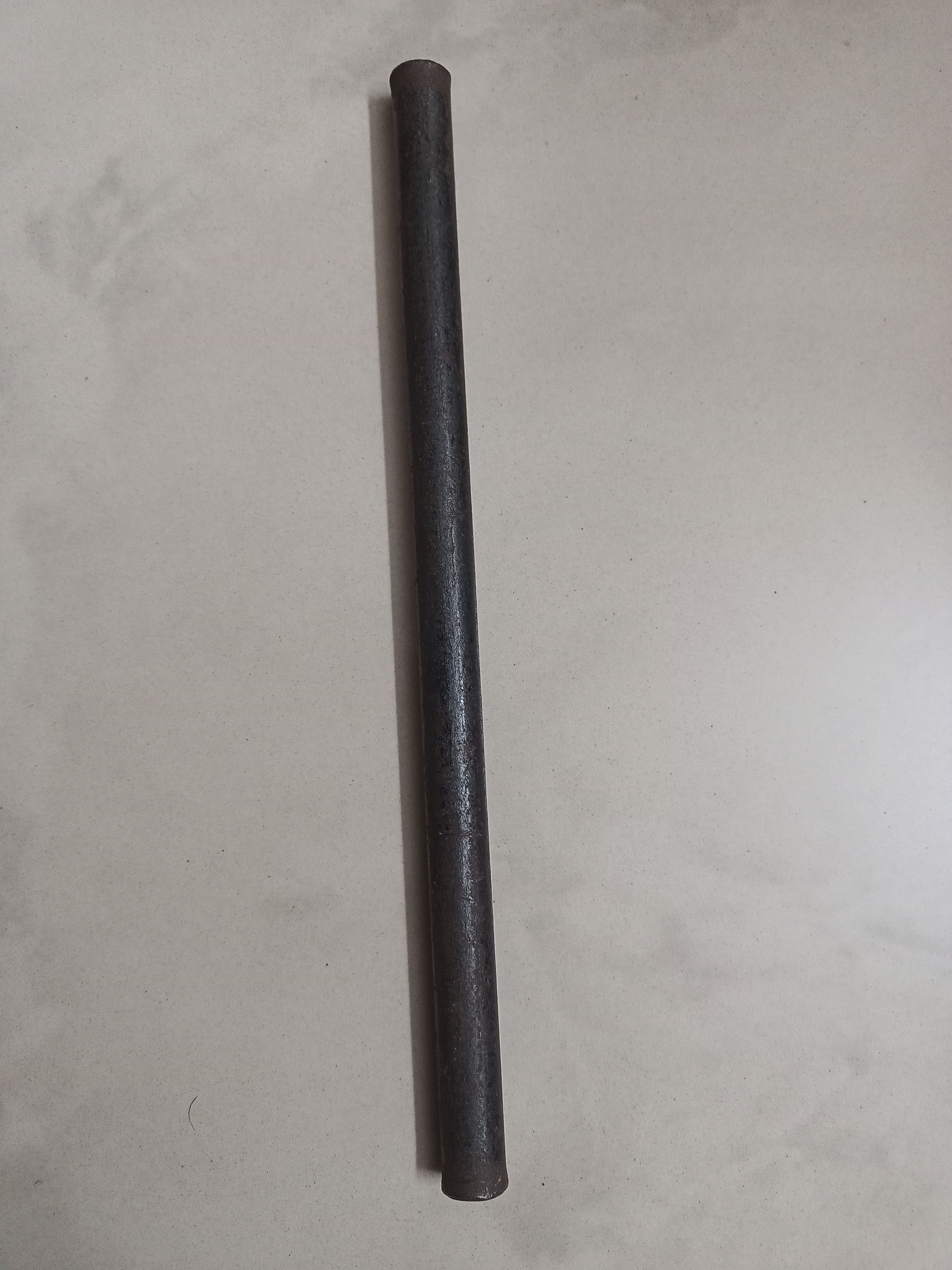
Steel Drift

In metalworking, a drift pin, drift pin punch, simply drift, is the name for a tool used for localizing a hammer blow. A drift is smaller in diameter than the hammer face, thus concentrating the force into a smaller area. A drift is also used where the surrounding surfaces need to be protected from the hammer blow.

A drift is not used as a punch in the traditional sense of the term. Unlike most punches, force should never be applied to the tip of drift pin.

Drifts are constructed from wood, light alloys, copper, or steel which are usually rods cut to size as for the job.

Drifts can be used to remove dents from inaccessible places, for striking pins and keys out.

Some drift pins are constructed with a taper, with the hammer acting on the large end of the taper. The tapered drift pin is used to align the two bolt holes in two separate components that are designed to mate. First the two components are maneuvered until the holes in each are in semi-alignment, such that the narrow end of the tapered drift pin can be inserted through the two holes. The pin is then driven into the two holes forcing them into true alignment, allowing for easy insertion of the fastener. This technique is especially useful for aligning fastener holes in structural steel members, which always have multiple holes, such that when one pair of mating holes comes into alignment, the others in the set are aligned, allowing a fastener, usually a bolt, to be inserted, before the drift pin is removed. In this situation the tapered drift pin is on the handle end of a spud wrench used for assembling trusses, structural steel beams, and steel pipe flanges. A spud wrench is seldom hammered to set the pin in the two holes.

== See also ==
- Punch (tool)
