= Daniel Chapman Stillson =

American inventor

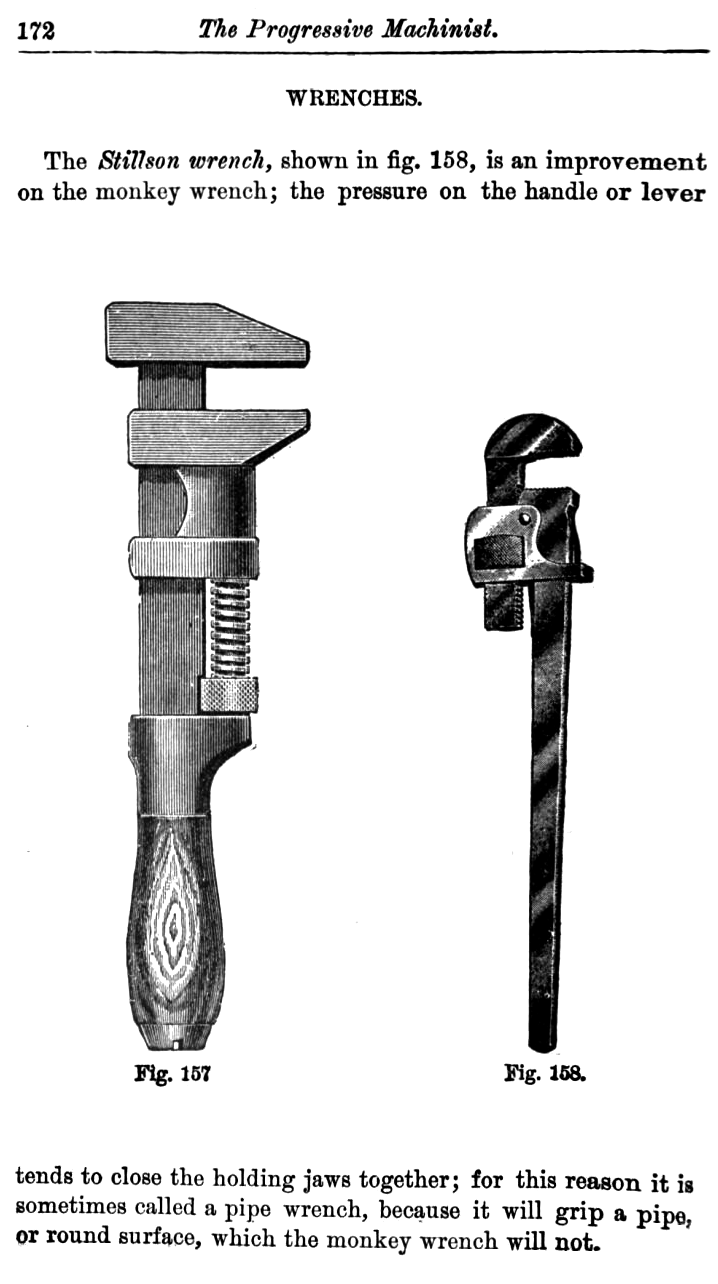
Monkey and Stillson wrenches

Daniel Chapman Stillson (March 25, 1826 – August 23, 1899) was an American inventor. He invented the modern adjustable pipe wrench.

== Biography ==
He was born March 25, 1826, in Durham, New Hampshire. He was the son of William Stillson and Nancy Chapman. He married Ellen Raynes Davis on April 18, 1855.

He was a machinist during the American Civil War and served on David Glasgow Farragut's first voyage as a vice admiral. At the end of the Civil War, Stillson returned to Charlestown, Massachusetts, and eventually he moved to Somerville, Massachusetts. He then worked as a machinist at the J. J. Walworth Company in the Cambridgeport section of Cambridge, Massachusetts. While at the J. J. Walworth Company, he developed his pipe wrench. On September 13, 1870, he was issued his patent. Stillson was paid about $80,000 in royalties during his lifetime.

He died on August 23, 1899, and is buried at Mount Auburn Cemetery in Cambridge and Watertown, Massachusetts.

== Patent ==
U.S. patent 95,744
