= Diamond Calk Horseshoe Company =

American metalwork company, 1908 to 1981

The Diamond Calk Horseshoe Company of Duluth, Minnesota, USA was founded in 1908 by blacksmith Otto Swanstrom.

Initially manufacturing horseshoes with a special type of calk to improve the animals' foothold on slippery surfaces, the company successfully adapted to the development of motorised transport for the masses and produced a range of adjustable wrenches and pliers from the 1920s. The family-owned company was sold to the Triangle Corporation in 1981; Triangle itself was eventually sold to Cooper Tools.

In 1994, the last workers vacated. The building was demolished in 1996.

== Gallery ==
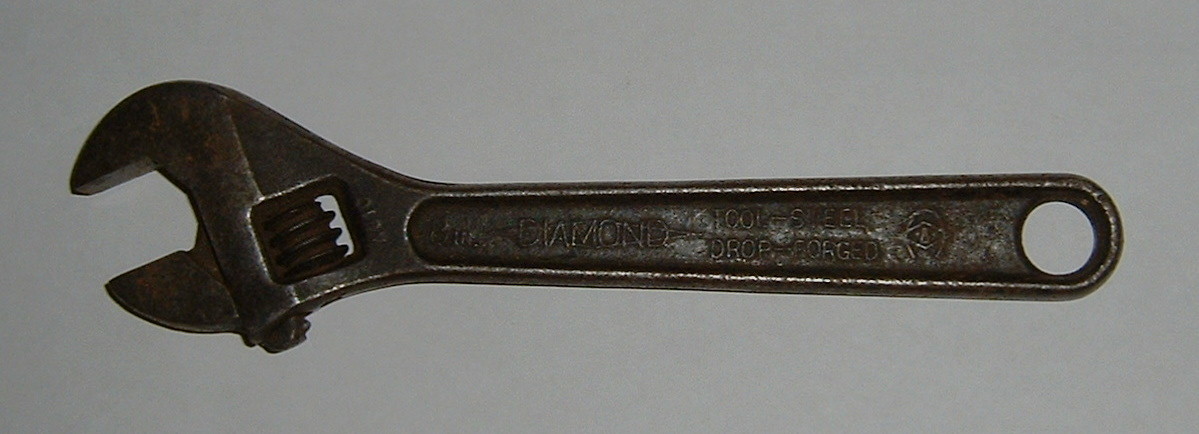
Early 8" adjustable wrench manufactured by the Diamond Calk Horseshoe Company

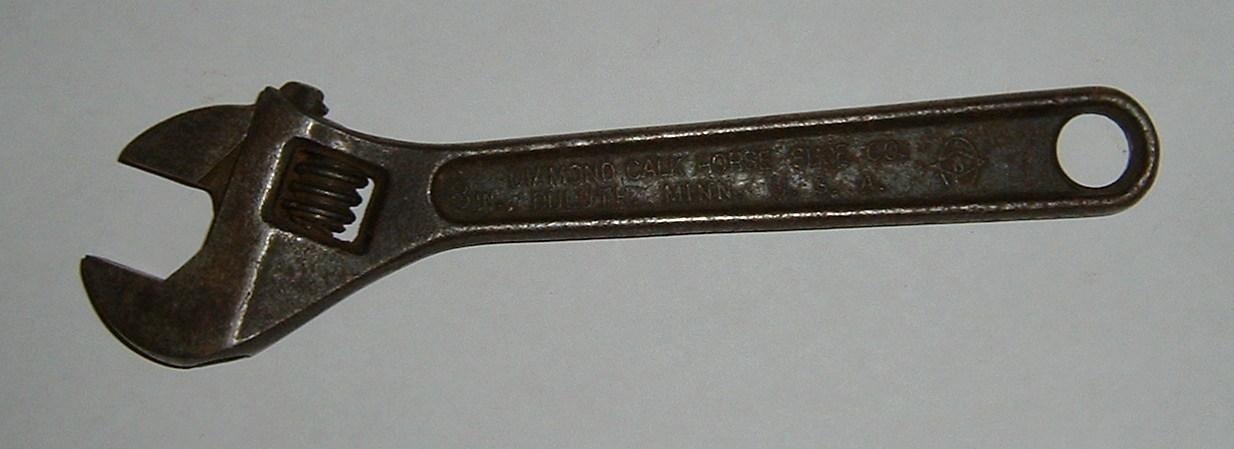
Early 8" adjustable wrench manufactured by the Diamond Calk Horseshoe Company: opposite side showing manufacturers marks

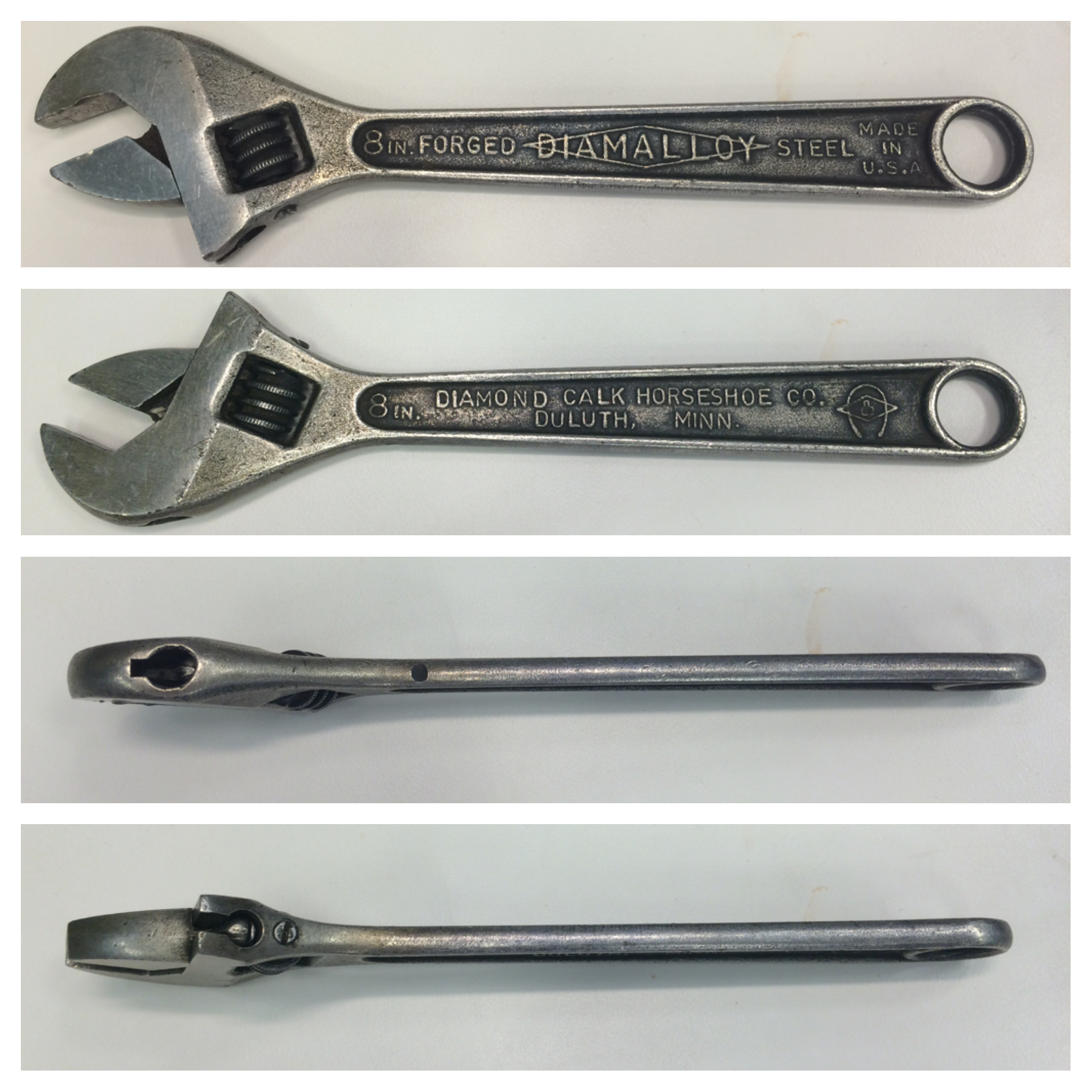
Diamond Calk Horseshoe CO. 8in adjustable wrench
