= Plumber wrench =

Wrench used to rotate pipes

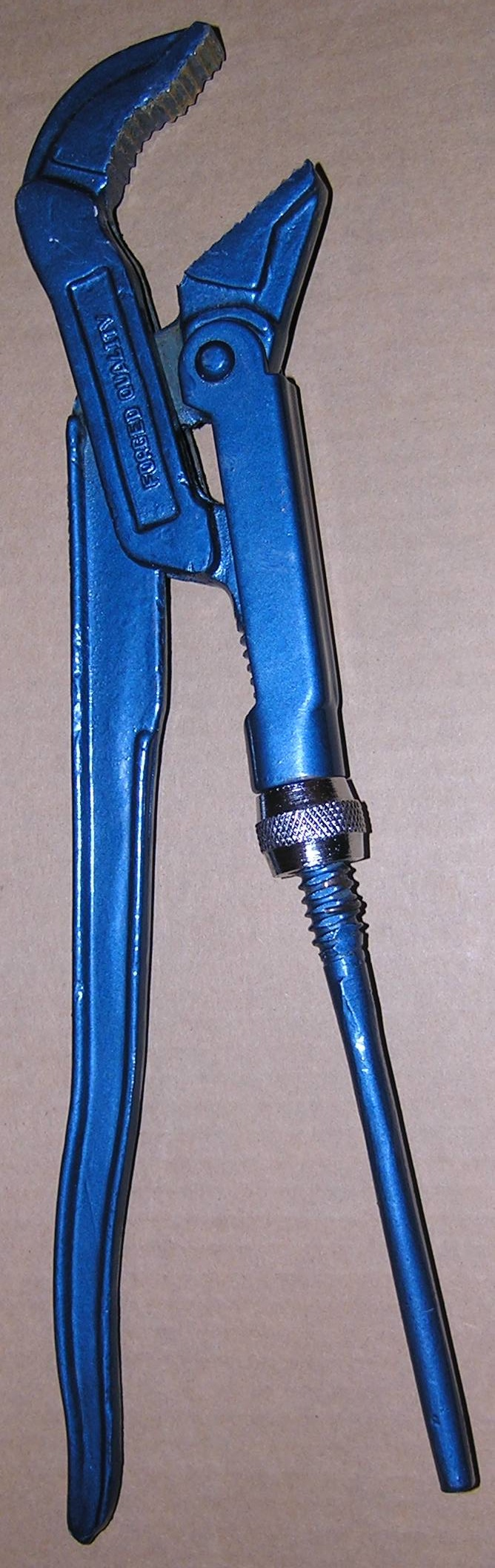
A plumber wrench

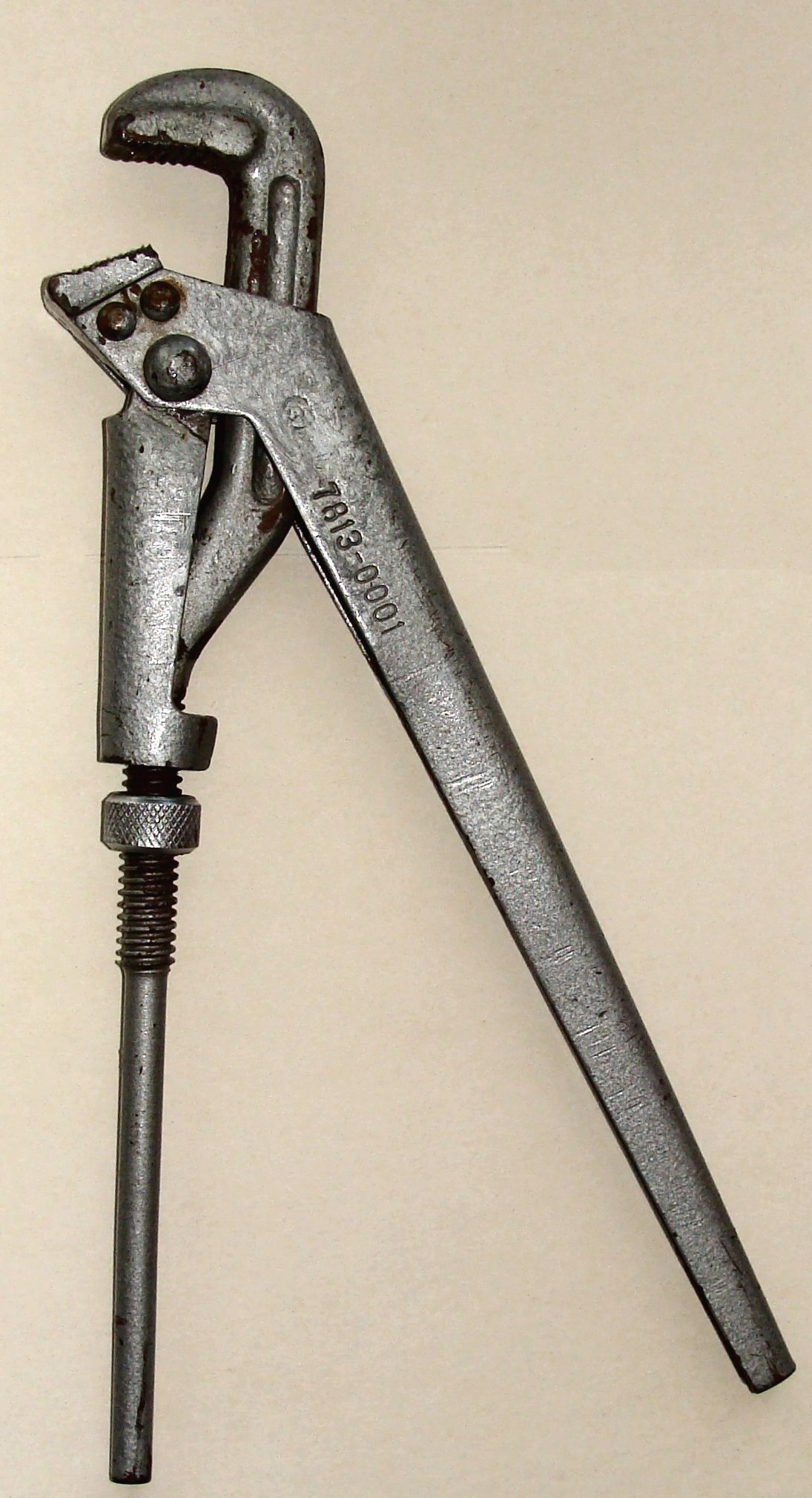
A plumber wrench, with the key ring on the thread of the left handle

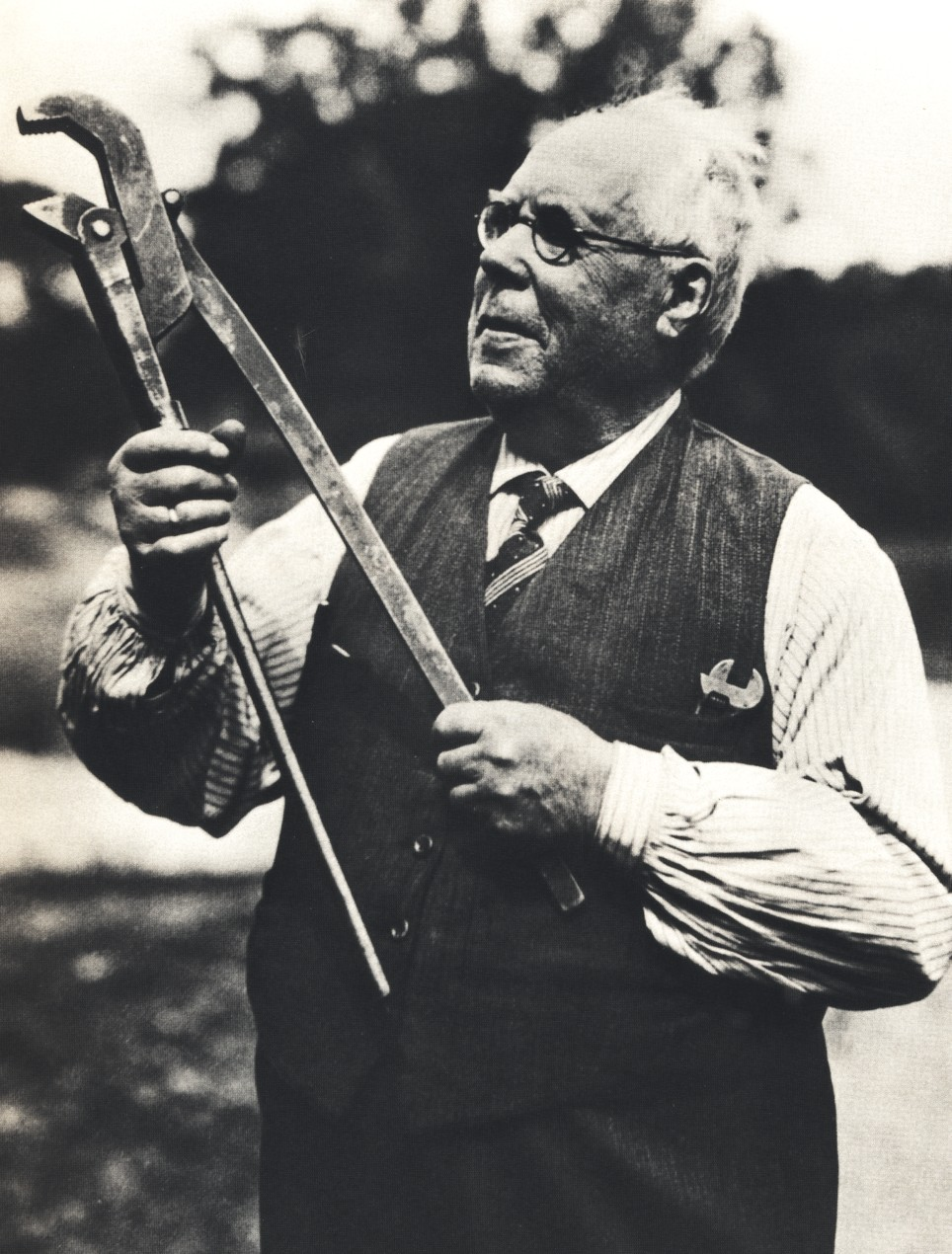
Johan Petter Johansson with his wrench

A plumber wrench (or plumber's wrench, pipe wrench, Swedish wrench or Swedish pattern wrench) is a form of plier described as a pipe wrench that uses compound leverage to grip and rotate plumbing pipes. Similar to the action of a Vise Grip plier, its jaw opening is adjusted to width by rotating a threaded ring. Its advantage is that it grips with significant force without needing to engage a lock nut like an adjustable tongue-and-groove plier. Like these, it can also be used on nuts, particularly hex shaped, and other flat engagement points. If used carelessly it can dent or break plumbing pipe.

== History ==
The plumber wrench was invented in 1888 by the Swedish inventor named Johan Petter Johansson. It shares some principles with both the Stillson-pattern pipe wrench and the rigid pipe wrench, as well as various forms of adjustable pliers, such as the vise grip and "Channelock" tongue-and-groove plier. Johansson invented the tool to eliminate the need for tradesmen to transport a heavy trolley of fixed-size pipe wrenches to every job site.

Johansson's tool is used rather than traditional pipe tongs to tighten or loosen threaded pipe fittings. It is not widely known in North America, but is common in Europe.

Johansson also improved the adjustable wrench, with a patent in 1891.

== See also ==
- Basin wrench
- Monkey wrench
- Pipe wrench
- Tongue-and-groove pliers
