= Adjustable spanner =

Wrench that can be adjusted to handle various sizes of fasteners

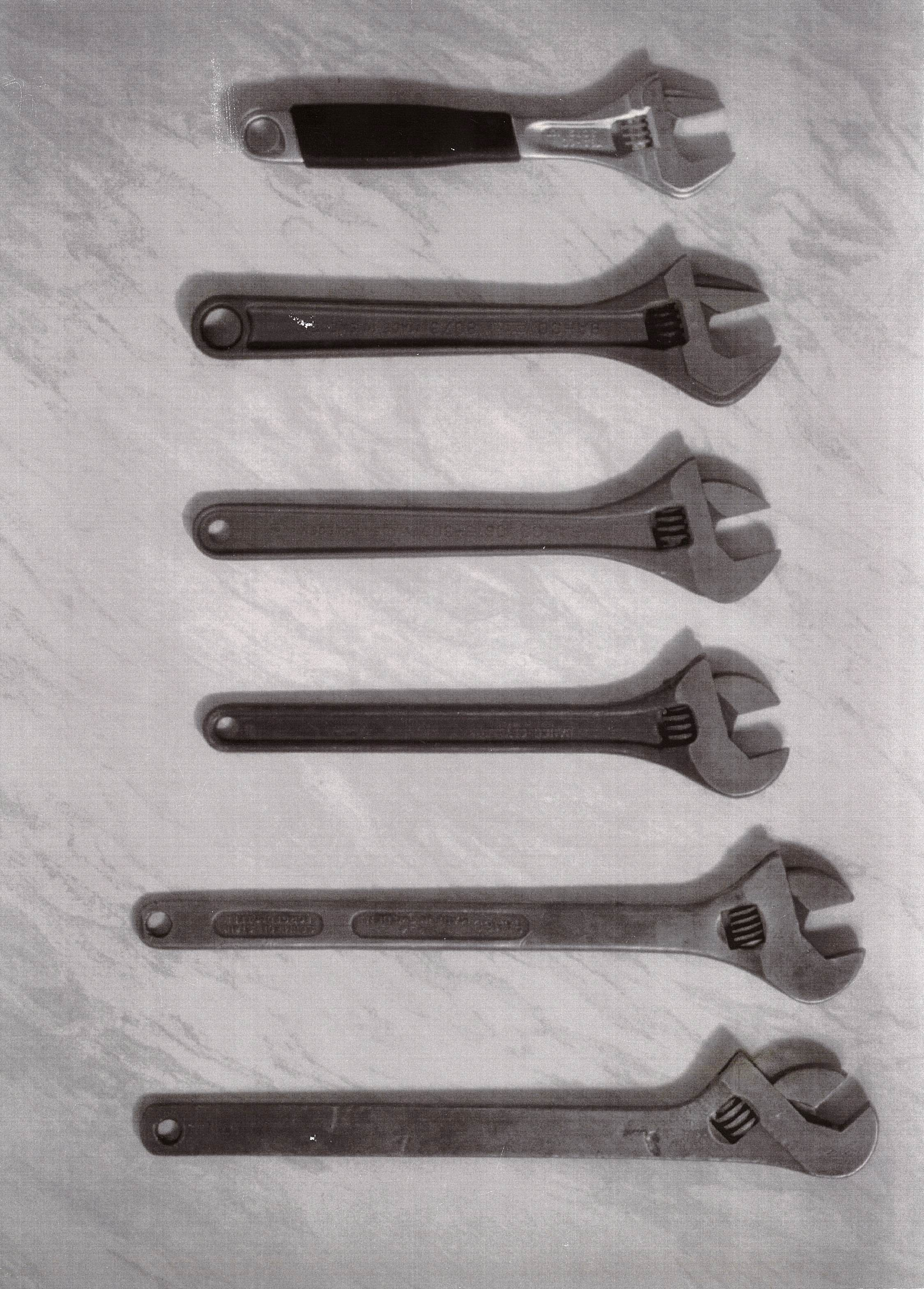
From the bottom: 1. The first BAHCO-improvement adjustable wrench from 1892 (Enköping Mekaniska Verkstad); 2. Adjustable wrench from 1910 with an improved handle (BAHCO); 3. Adjustable wrench from 1915 with a slightly rounder handle (BAHCO); 4. Adjustable wrench from 1954 with improved handle and new jaw angle of 15 degrees (BAHCO); 5. Adjustable wrench from 1984 and the first with ERGO handle (BAHCO); 6. Today's version of the adjustable wrench from 1992 with ERGO (BAHCO)

An adjustable spanner (UK), also called a shifting spanner or shifter (Australia and New Zealand) or adjustable wrench (US and Canada), (Note: In many non-English speaking countries, it is called an English wrench (e.g., in Turkey).) is any of various styles of spanner (wrench) with a movable jaw, allowing it to be used with different sizes of fastener head (nut, bolt, etc.) rather than just one fastener size, as with a conventional fixed spanner.

== Forms and names ==
There are many forms of adjustable spanners; many of them are screw-adjusted, whereas others use levers, and some early ones used wedges. The early taper-locking spanners needed a hammer to set the movable jaw to the size of the nut. The modern screw-adjusted spanner and lever types are easily and quickly adjusted. Some adjustable spanners automatically adjust to the size of the nut, using a motor and battery. Simpler models use a serrated edge to lock the movable jaw to size, while more sophisticated versions are digital types that use sheets or feelers to set the size.

Geesin (2015) shows that wrenches with screw adjustment of various kinds were well known in the early 19th century and that one by William Barlow in 1808 was prescient. By the 1830s, many designs with a central screw and a lower jaw moved by a nut were well known. Geesin and others document that English engineers Richard Clyburn and Edwin Beard Budding presented some influential new designs in 1842 and 1843. The one by Clyburn had the form of thumbwheel screw with worm-on-rack arrangement that would later be the most famous via subsequent adaptations. Improvements followed. In 1885 Enoch Harris received US patent 326868 for his spanner that permitted both the jaw width and the angle of the handles to be adjusted and locked.

One of the most widely known forms of adjustable wrench in the 21st century is an improved version of the Clyburn type; it was developed in 1891–1892. The Swedish company Bahco attributes its invention to Johan Petter Johansson, who in 1892 received a Swedish patent for it. In Canada and the United States, this type is often known as a Crescent wrench owing to widespread genericization of the brand name of the company that held the original 1915 U.S. patent for this type (U.S. patent 1133236A), the Crescent Tool Company. (The Crescent brand is now owned by the Apex Tool Group). As Geesin 2015 documents, the worm-on-rack type (regardless of which terminology is used to name it) was invented in Britain, and later popularized in Scandinavia via the Bahco/Johansson improvement, before its manufacture in the United States was patented. The Bahco/Johansson/Crescent category (regardless of which terminology is used to name it) became so dominant in the 20th century that in North America, the very term adjustable wrench usually elicits the meaning of this type in general usage today, unless another type is specified. In Australia it is sometimes referred to as a "shifting spanner" or its abbreviated form of "shifter".

Monkey wrenches are another type of adjustable spanner with a long history; the origin of the name is not entirely clear, but Geesin reports that it originated in Britain with a fancied resemblance of the wrench's jaws to that of a monkey's face, and that the many convoluted folk etymologies that later developed were baseless. Before the Bahco/Johansson/Crescent type became widespread in the United States, during the industrial era of the 1860s to the 1910s, various monkey wrench types were the dominant form of adjustable wrench there.

Another popular type of adjustable spanner has a base and jaws that form four sides of a hexagon, and is therefore particularly suited for hexagonal nuts ("hex nuts") and hexagonal headed ("hex head") cap screws and bolts.

In some parts of Europe, adjustable spanners are often called a Bahco, owing to genericization of the name of the Bahco/Johansson type. In Denmark, this type of spanner is commonly referred to as a "svensknøgle", which basically translates to Swedish key. The Swedes themselves call the key "skiftnyckel", which is translated into adjustable key (shifting key). In Australia, adjustable spanners are also referred to as "shifters". In Spain, this kind of spanner is commonly called "llave inglesa", which means literally English key. Remarking the difference with the pipe wrench, also adjustable, in Spain this one is called "grifa", and it does not have any accurate translation.

== Design and use ==
The fixed jaw can withstand bending stress far better than can the movable jaw, because the latter is supported only by the flat surfaces on either side of the guide slot, not the full thickness of the tool. The tool is therefore usually angled so that the movable jaw's area of contact is closer to the body of the tool, which means less bending stress. Still, one should avoid applying excessive force on tight bolts, since doing so can pry open the mounting of the movable jaw causing the wrench to no longer be able to be snugged to bolt heads, loosen too easily, or mar bolt heads. In some cases the jaws of the tool can break.

== Gallery ==
A CAD drawing of a Johansson type, called a Swedish key in some times and places

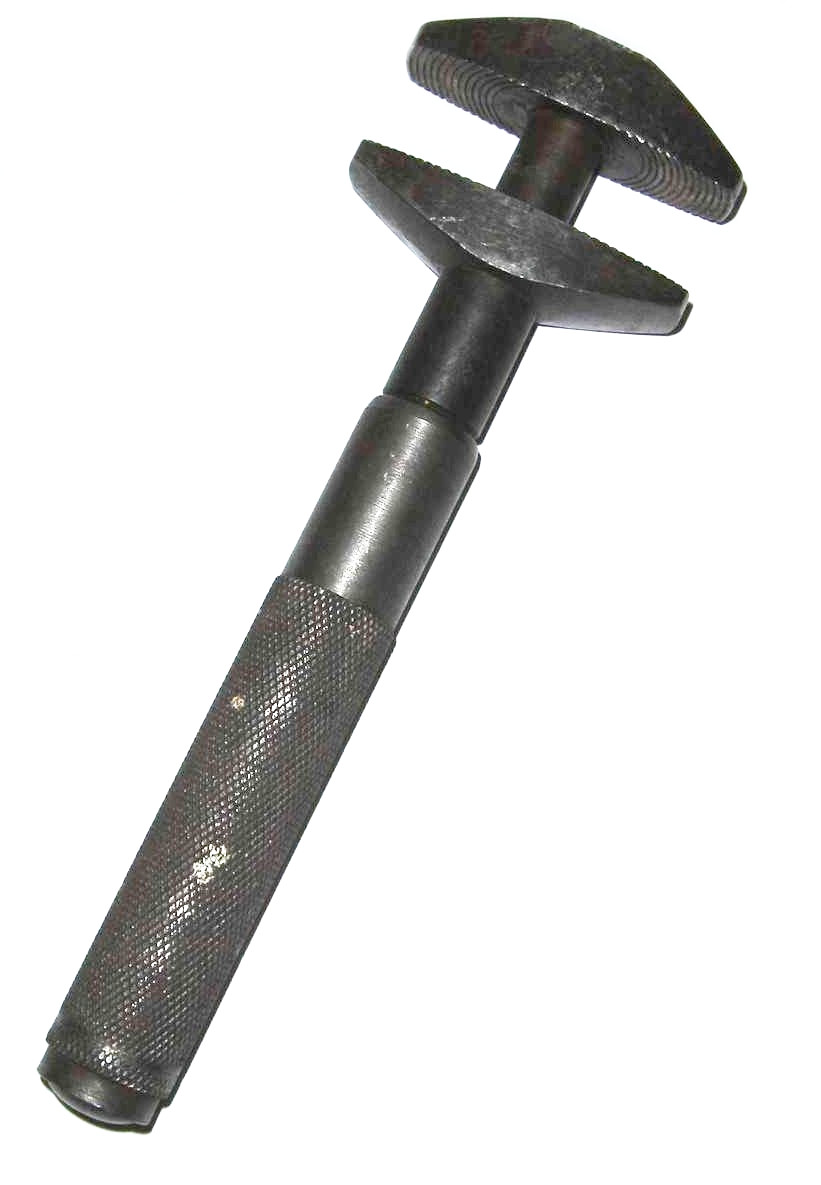
A type called a French key in some times and places

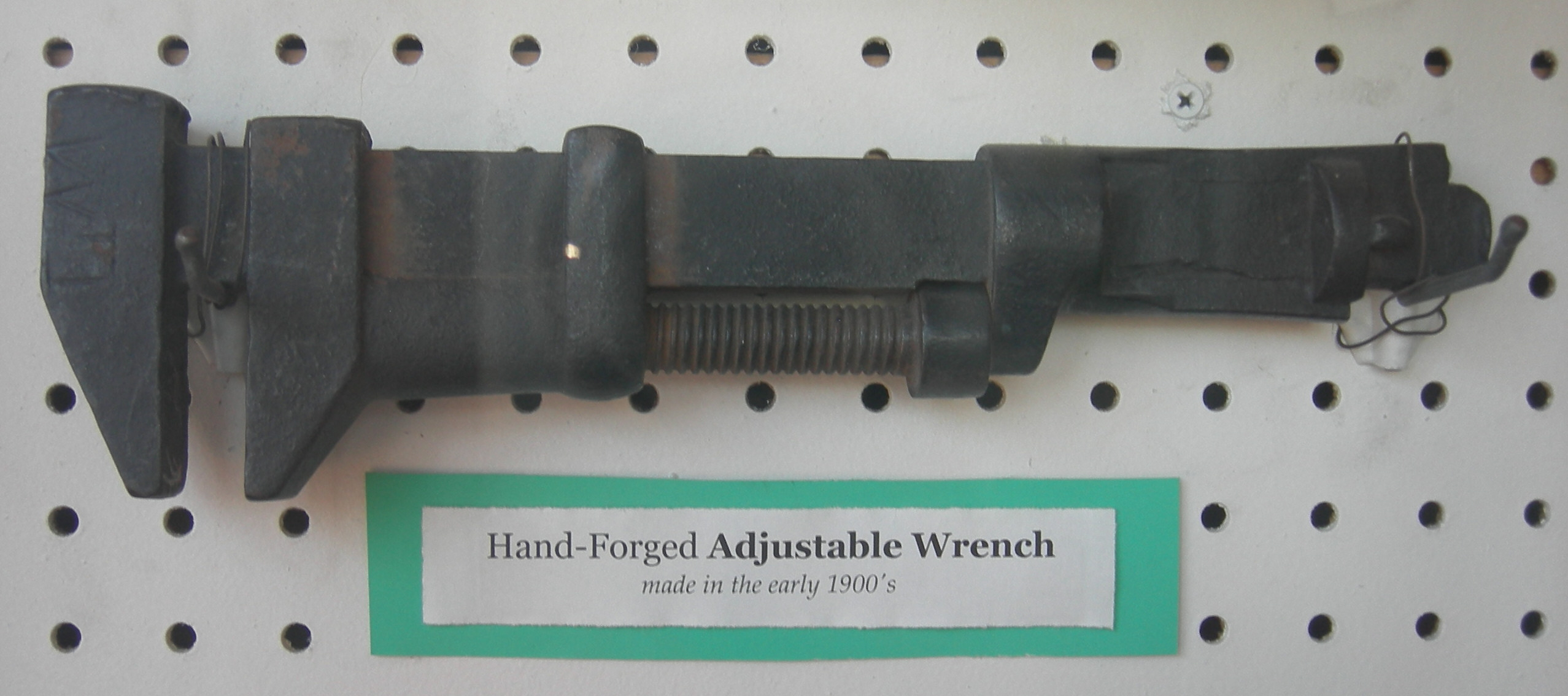
A hand-forged monkey wrench from the early 1900s, called an English key in some times and places

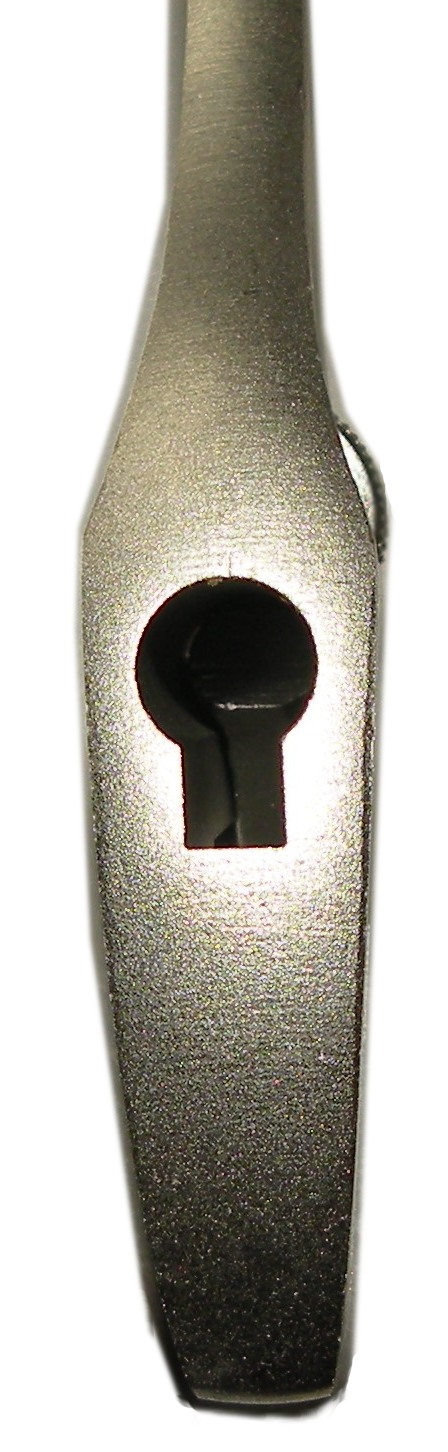
The keyway of an adjustable wrench

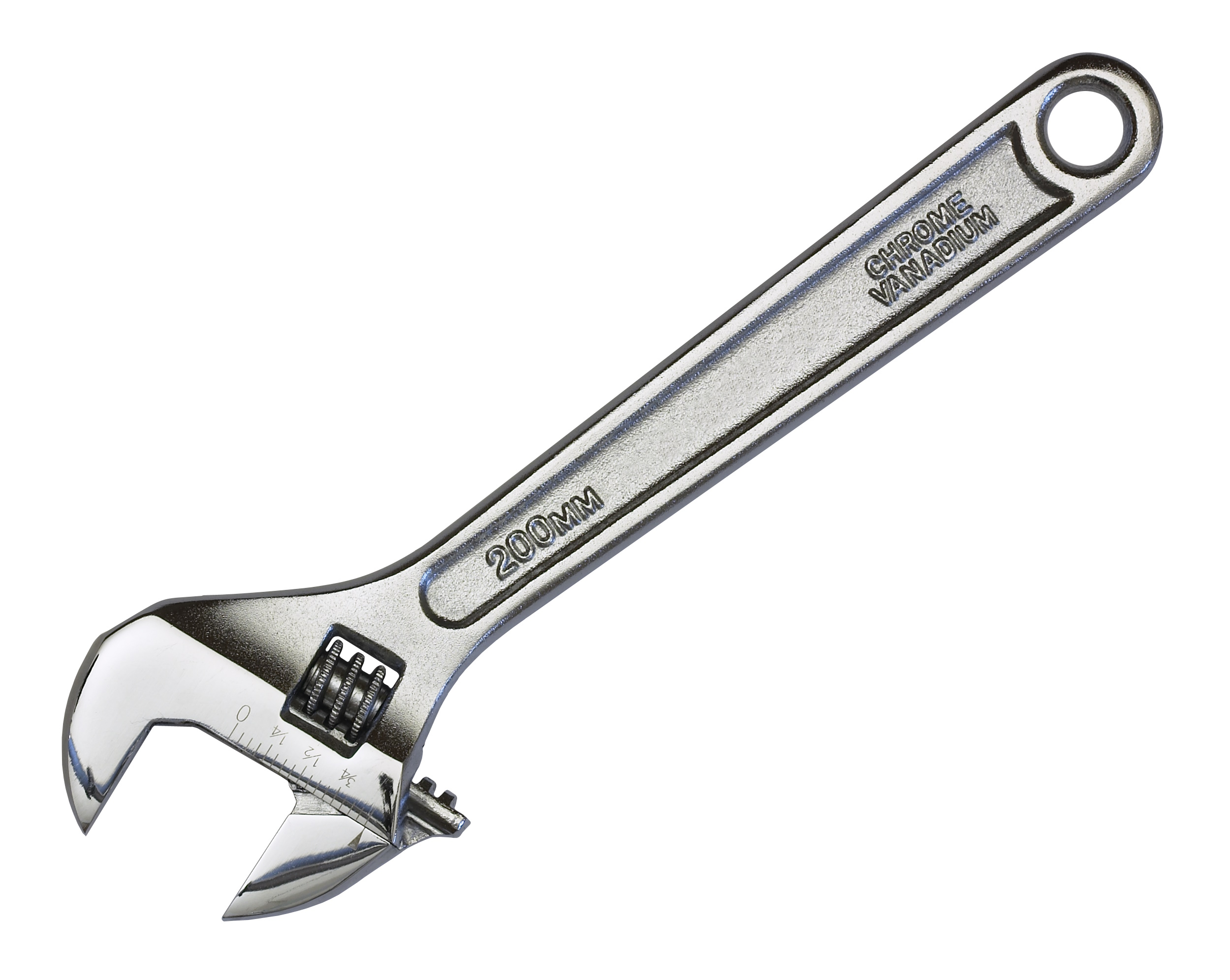
Chrome vanadium adjustable wrench

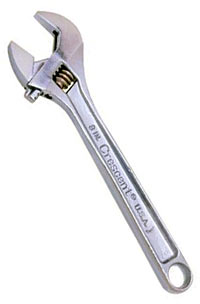
Adjustable wrench for hexagonal ("hex") fasteners

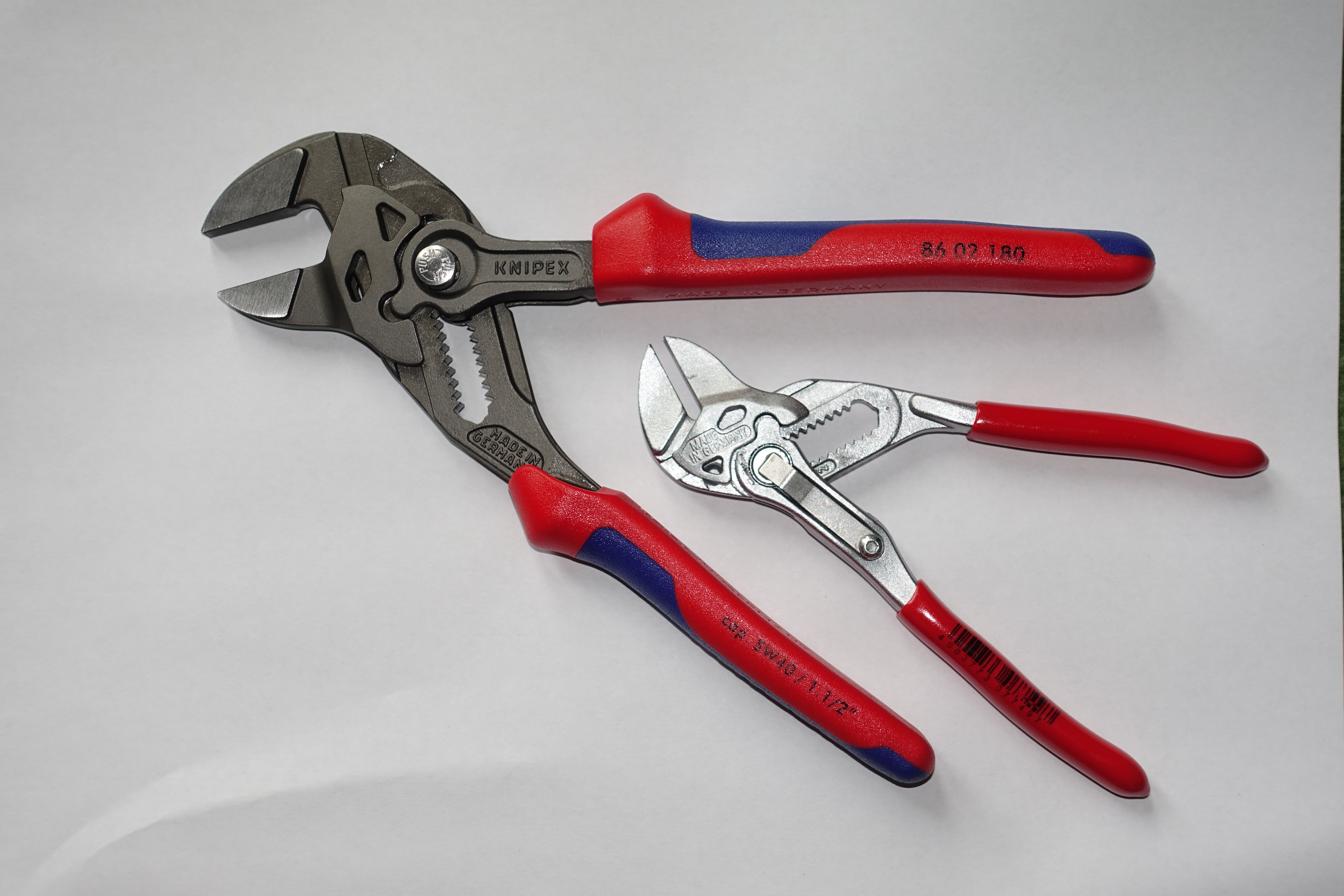
Contemporary pliers wrench with high mechanical advantage parallel-gripping jaws.

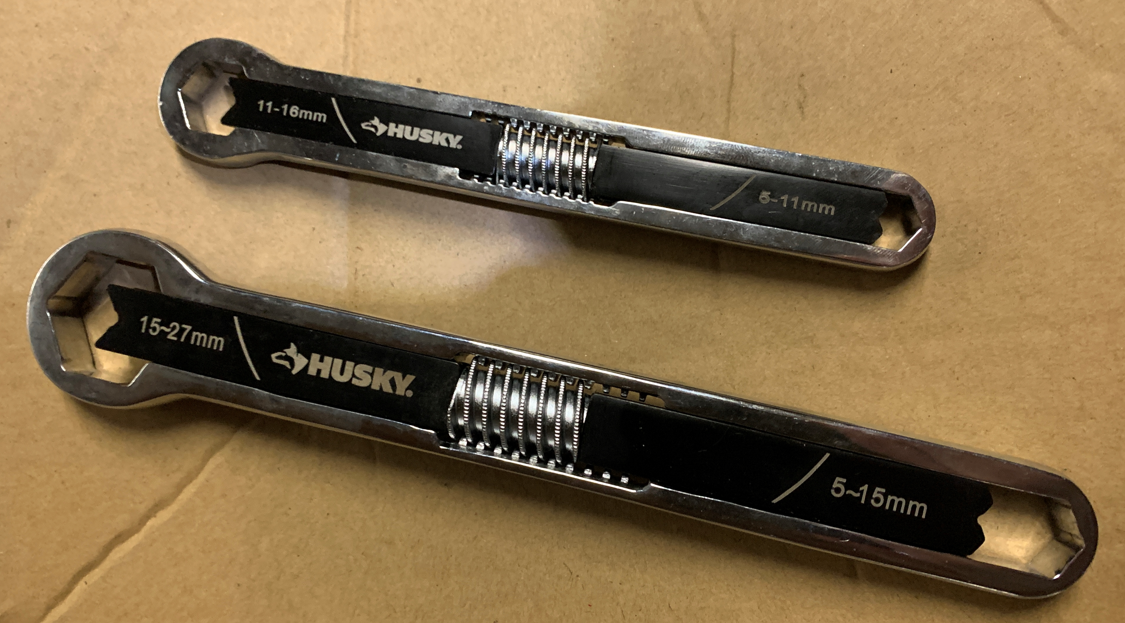
A pair of adjustable wrenches of a box-end style.

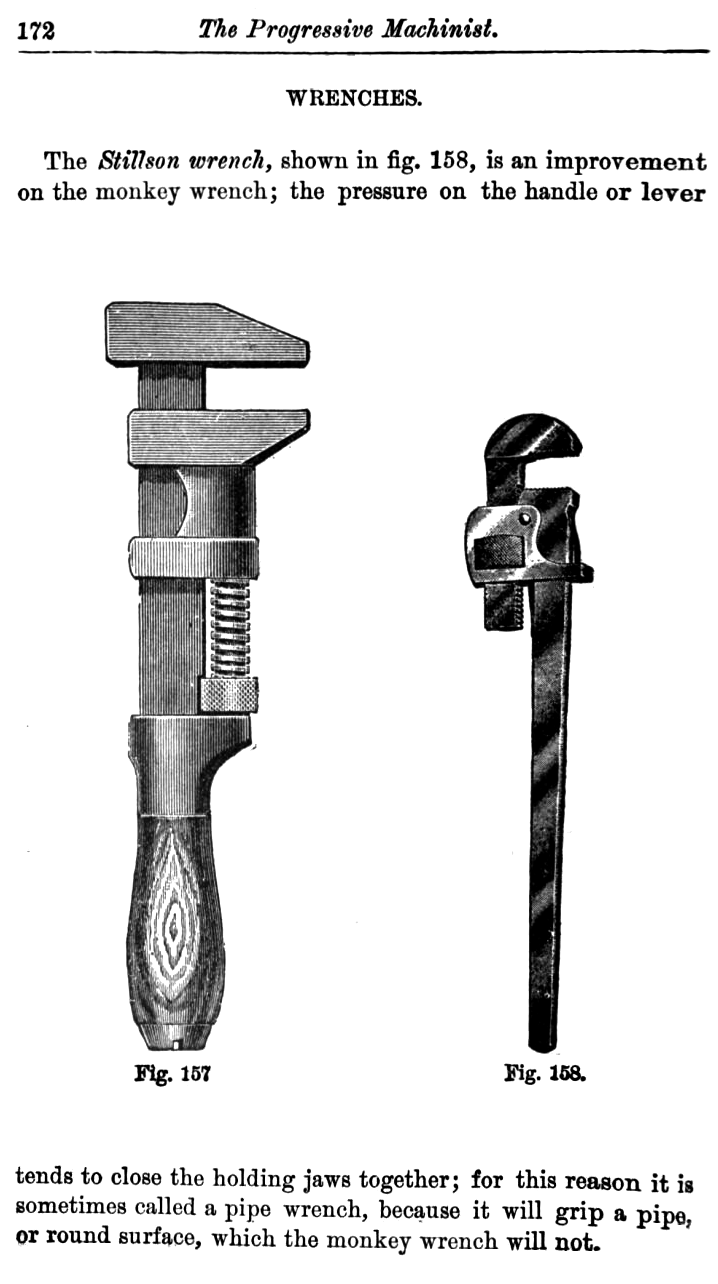
Monkey wrench (left) compared to Stillson or pipe wrench (right)

== See also ==
- Types:
  - Monkey wrench
- Relevant companies and brands, past and present:
  - Bahco
  - Channellock
  - Crescent (brand)
  - Diamond Calk Horseshoe Company
  - Knipex
- Other tools with movable jaws, but serrated:
  - Locking pliers
  - Pipe wrench (including Stillson type)
  - Plumber wrench
  - Tongue-and-groove pliers
