= Oil-filter wrench =

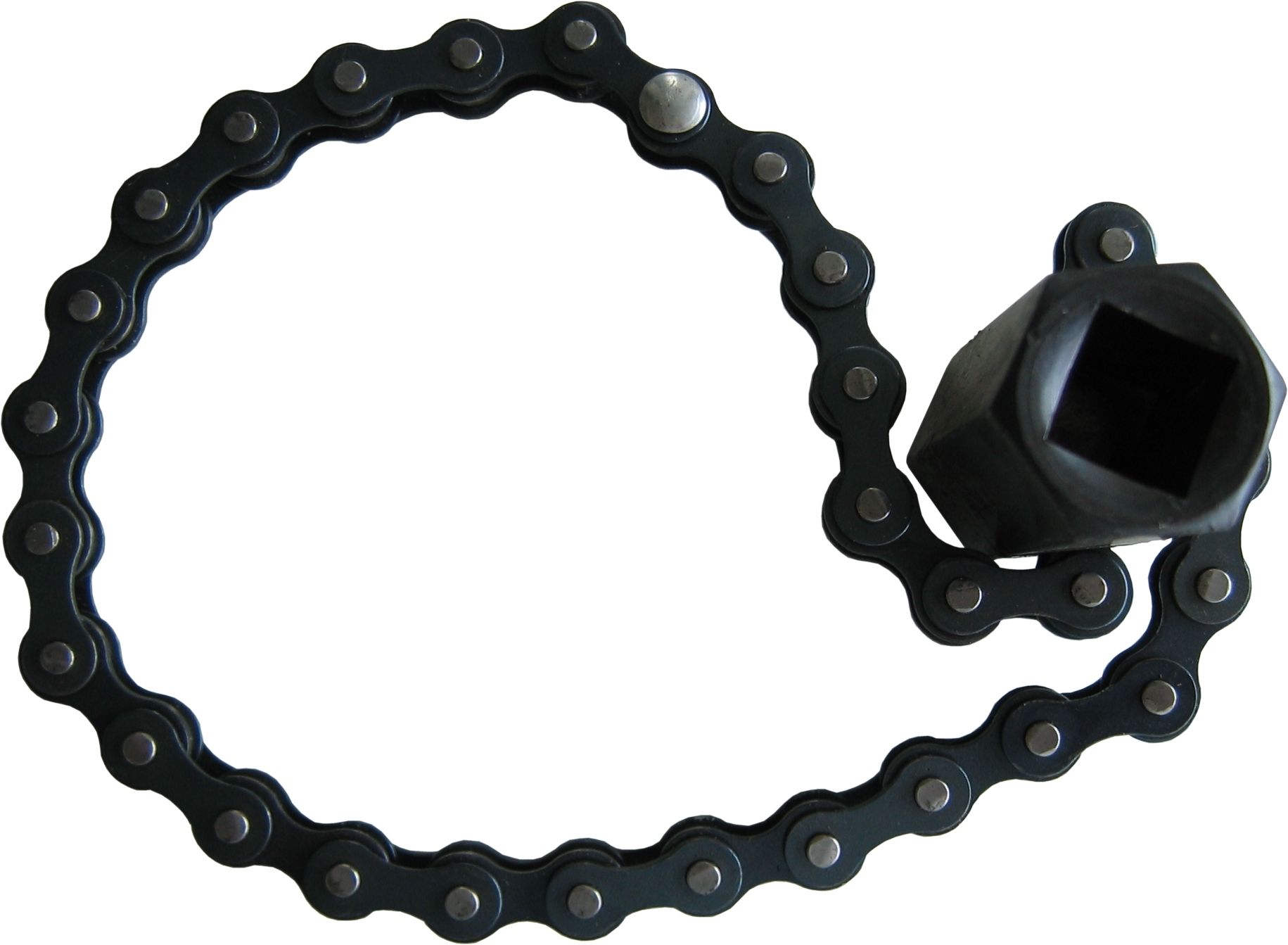
Chain-type oil-filter wrench. The chain is wrapped around a spin-on oil filter, and the hexagonal bar is turned anticlockwise to grip and unscrew the filter.

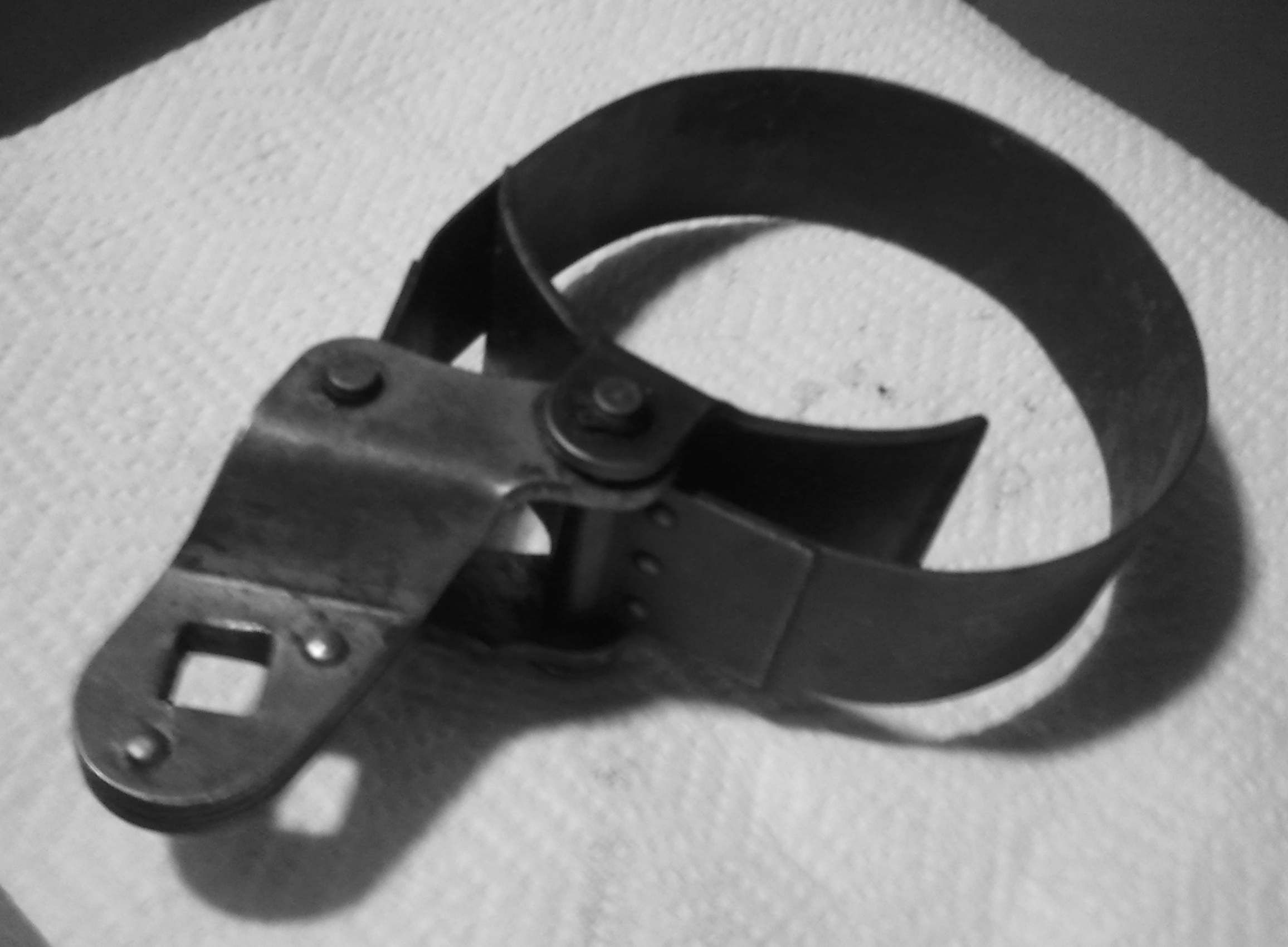
Strap-type oil-filter wrench. A ratchet is used to turn it.

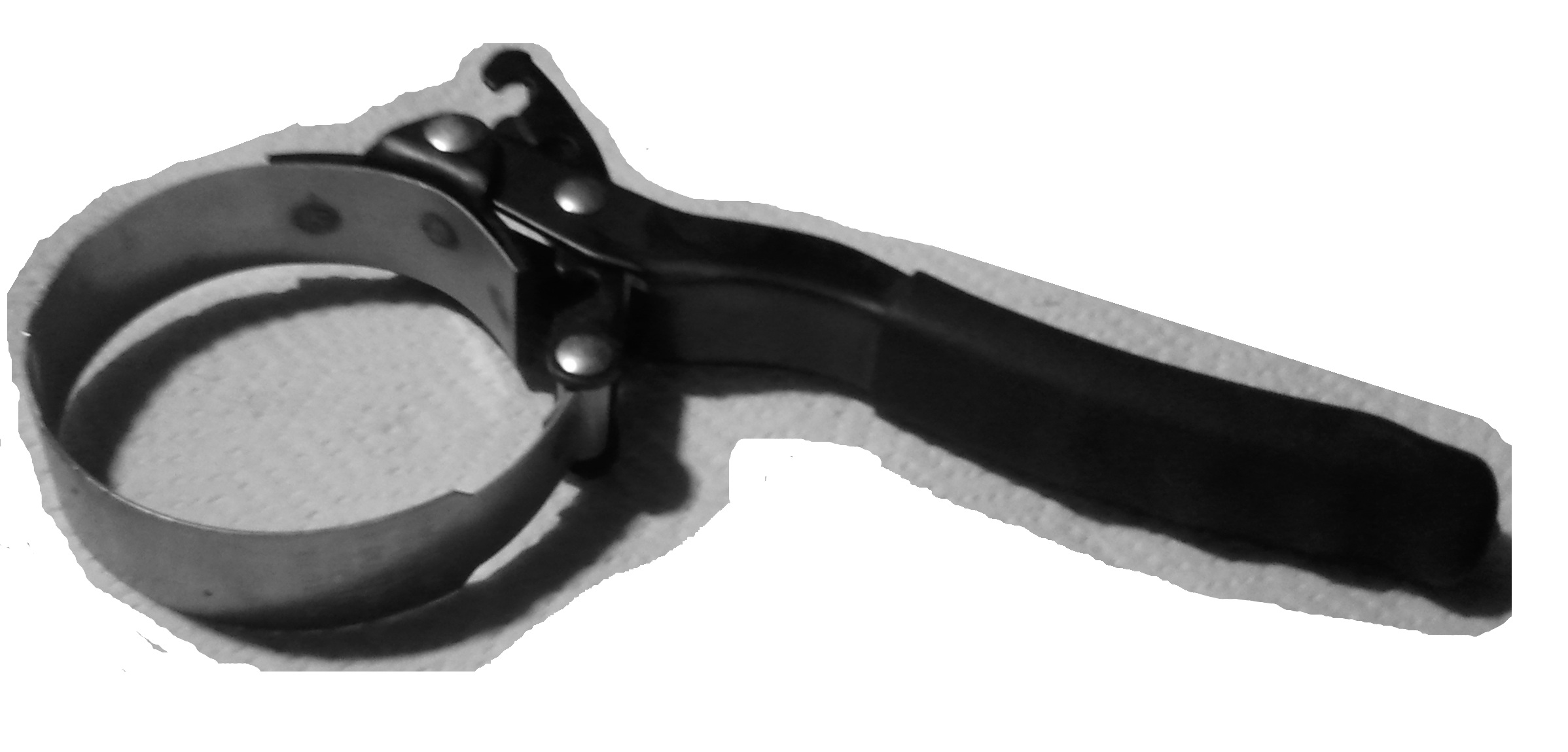
Strap-type oil-filter wrench. This one has a handle built in.

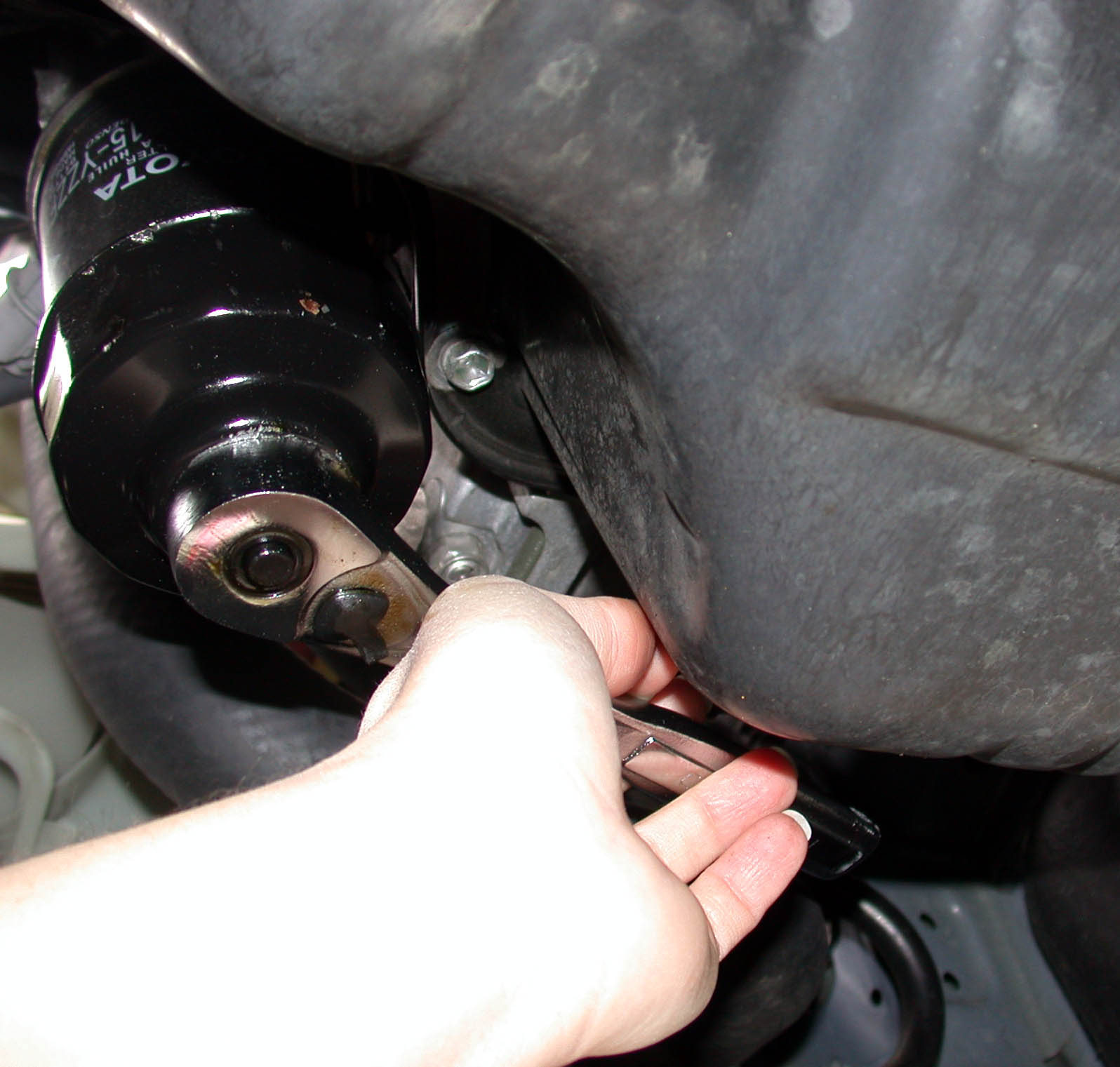
Socket-type oil-filter wrench. It fits over the end of the filter and is turned with a ratchet. It is made of stamped steel.

An oil-filter wrench is a tool for removing spin-on type oil filters.

== Wrench ==
These filters are smooth, cylindrical canisters with knurling on the bottom that are difficult to grip, especially when they are oily.

One common type of wrench is shown on the right. The loop of chain is placed around the filter, and the bar is turned anticlockwise by hand until the chain wraps itself tightly around the filter. A socket wrench or adjustable spanner is then used to turn the hexagonal bar further in the same direction. This increases the tension in the chain, which bites into the soft metal casing of the oil filter which helps prevent slippage.

Another type uses a metal band that is attached at both ends to a handle. The looped band is placed around the filter and the handle is turned anticlockwise, which puts tension on the band, causing it to grip the filter.

A third common type of wrench utilizes a metal or plastic cup that is shaped much like a socket. The cup is placed on the end of the filter, which engages the knurling. A socket or wrench is then used to loosen the filter. Volkswagen Group and BMW cars require this type of wrench to remove their filters (or the lid of the filter housing, where a non-cartridge filter is used).

Finally, a "claw" type of wrench, manufactured by Sykes-Pickavant and others, has three geared metal prongs and accommodates a (typically) 3/8" ratchet driver. As the driver is turned anticlockwise the gears make the prongs clench the filter body harder. This type is very effective on tight filters and can be used in more confined spaces than a strap or chain type.

K&N has designed their oil filters so that removal and installation can be done with a 3/4" or 19mm socket or wrench.
