= Johan Petter Johansson =

Swedish inventor and industrialist (1853–1943)

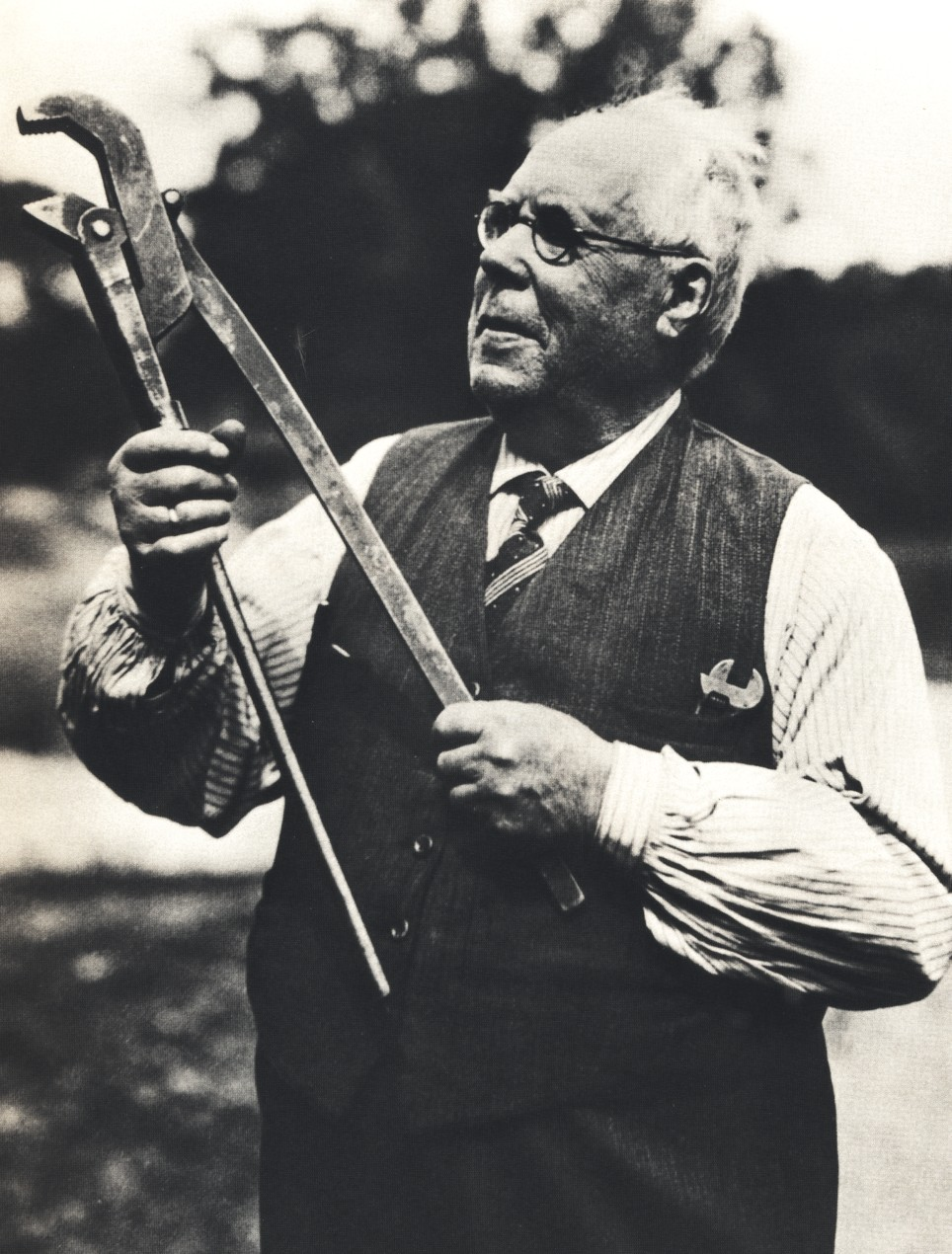
- J. P. Johansson with his favourite tool and invention, the plumber wrench. In his breast pocket, an adjustable spanner, also invented by him.
- Born: 12 December 1853; Vårgårda, Västra Götaland County, Sweden
- Died: 25 August 1943 (aged 89)
- Occupation: Inventor
- Known for: Inventor of an adjustable spanner and plumber wrench.
- Spouse: Matilda Johansson
- Children: Hannes Brynge

Johan Petter Johansson (December 12, 1853 – August 25, 1943), sometimes known as JP, was a Swedish inventor and industrialist. He invented a modern adjustable spanner (patents in 1891 and 11 May 1892). He obtained over 100 patents in total.

He was born in Vårgårda in western Sweden, the oldest of six children in a crofter's family. His first employment was as an assistant operator of a steam engine at a local peat factory. He left Vårgårda at age 19, in 1873, for Motala to work as a navvy. Following military service in 1874, he moved to Eskilstuna where he worked for the Bolinder-Munktell factory, and in 1878 he moved to Västerås where he found employment at a mechanical workshop. Following that, he worked as a blacksmith at a nearby farm.

At this time, he had made a decision to leave Sweden for the United States. This never happened; he was instead offered a more esteemed job by his former employer Munktells, and the offer changed his mind.

In 1886 he decided to start his own business and relocated to Enköping where he started Enköpings Mekaniska Verkstad (the Mechanical Workshop of Enköping), which quickly became a successful venture. It was during the years in his workshop that he invented the adjustable spanner and the plumber wrench. In 1890, B.A. Hjorth & Company agreed to distribute his tools worldwide under the "Bahco" trademark. The Bahco tools are still in production, having over 100 million wrenches manufactured to date.

Johansson transferred the then-large enterprise to his son, Hannes Brynge, and the B.A. Hjorth & Company in 1916. He started experimenting with Armature (electrical) and in 1919 opened a new factory, Triplex, which manufactured electrical pendulums and various devices.

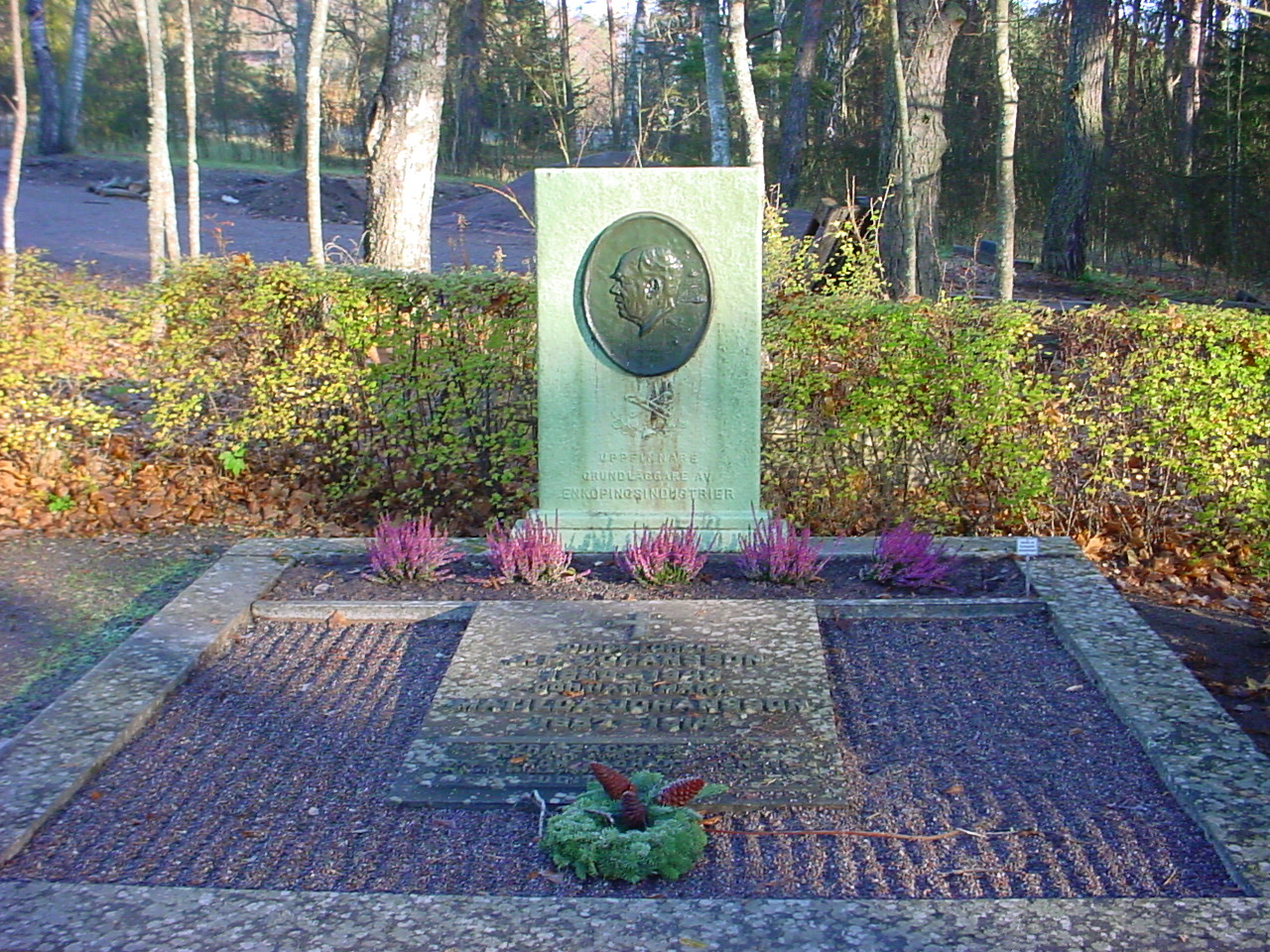
J. P. Johansson's grave in Enköping

He died at the age of 89 after having been productive for most of his life.
