= Edlunda =

Island in the Stockholm archipelago and Vaxholm municipality, Sweden

- Location within Stockholm Location within Sweden Location within European Union
- Coordinates: 59°22′25″N 18°19′14″E
- Country: Sweden
- Province: Uppland
- County: Stockholm County
- Municipality: Vaxholm Municipality
- Time zone: UTC+1 (CET)
  - Summer (DST): UTC+2 (CEST)

Edlunda, previously known as Östra Granholmen, is an island in the Stockholm archipelago in Sweden. It is situated in the Höggarnsfjärden waterway to the south of Vaxholm and Karlsudd and north of Stora and Lilla Höggarn. Administratively, it is in Vaxholm Municipality and Stockholm County.

Edlunda has no road connection to the mainland or other islands. It is served throughout the year by passenger ships of the Waxholmsbolaget, which call at a pier on the northern side of the island, providing a connection to Vaxholm town and Stockholm city.

The neighbouring island is Granholmen, sometimes called Västra Granholmen. The two islands were originally named after Erik and Carl Fredrik Granholm, who bought them in the 1860s. The new name Edlunda arose after Theodor Edlund bought the eastern part of the island in the 1880s and built Villa Edlunda, the first house on the island. This was followed by the heritage-listed Villa Ottarsberg in around 1884. Other early summer villas on Edlunda belonged to Berndt August Hjorth, Sten Dehlgren and Axel Notini.

== Gallery ==
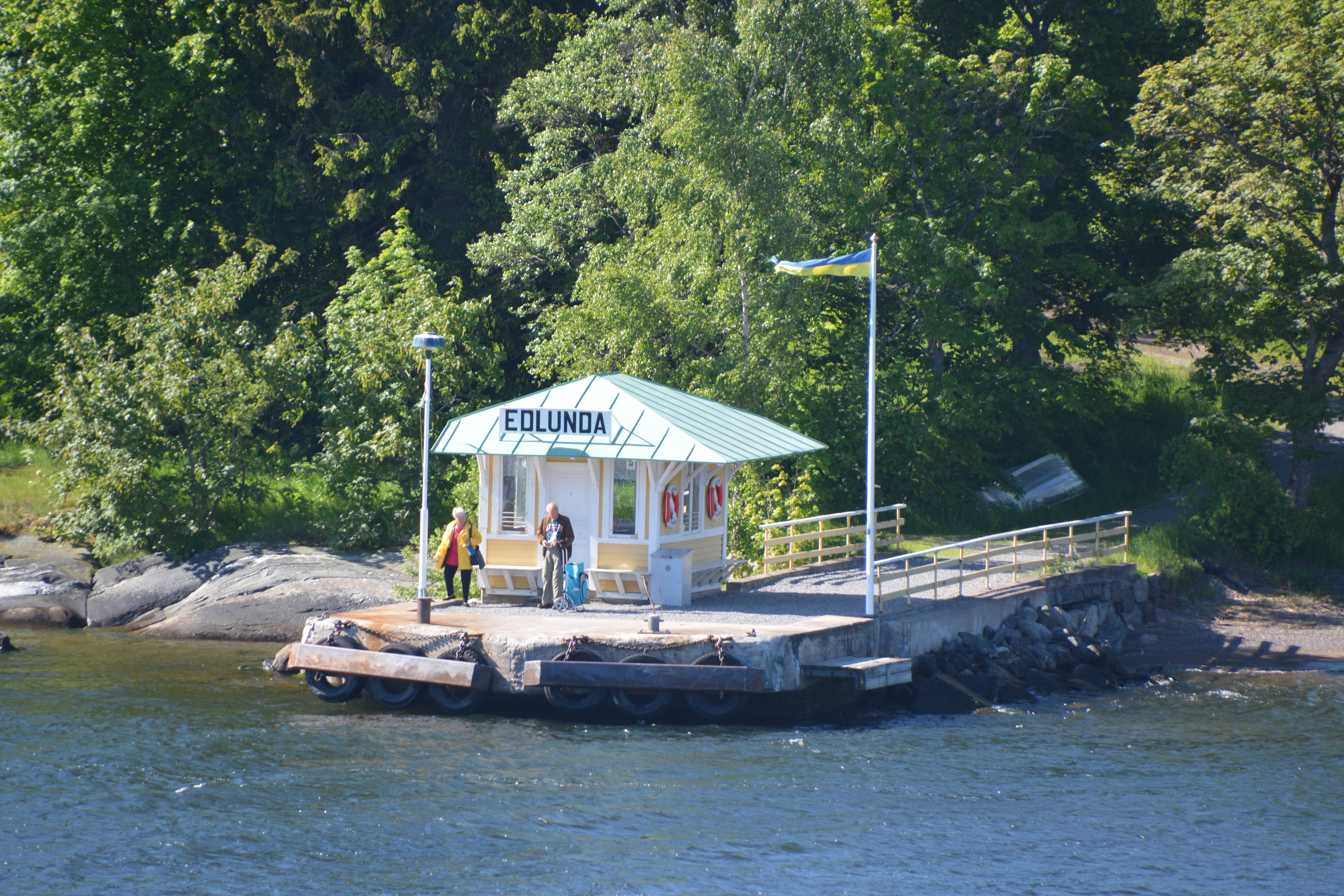
Edlunda pier, served by Waxholmsbolaget ships

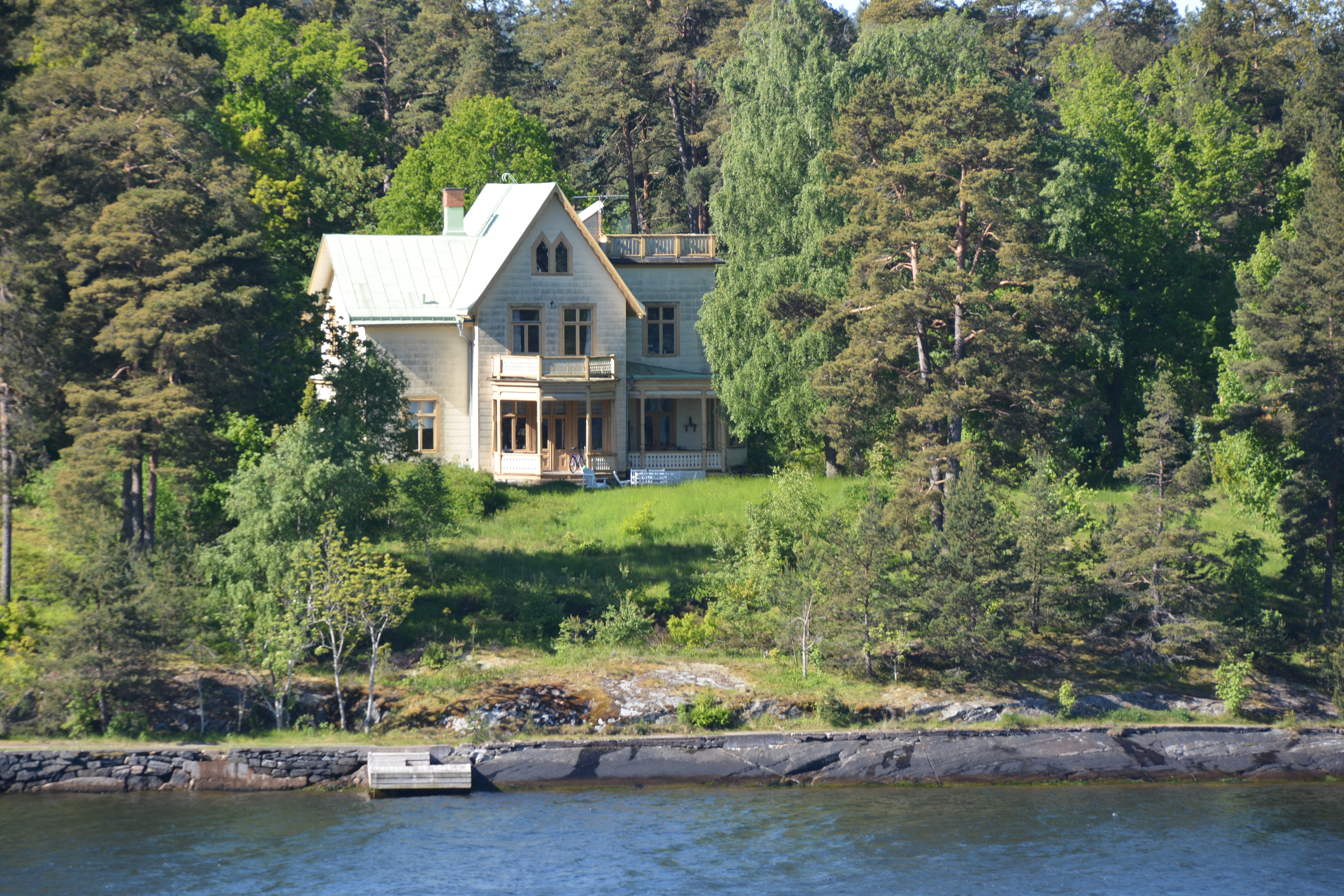
Villa Edlunda, the first house on the island

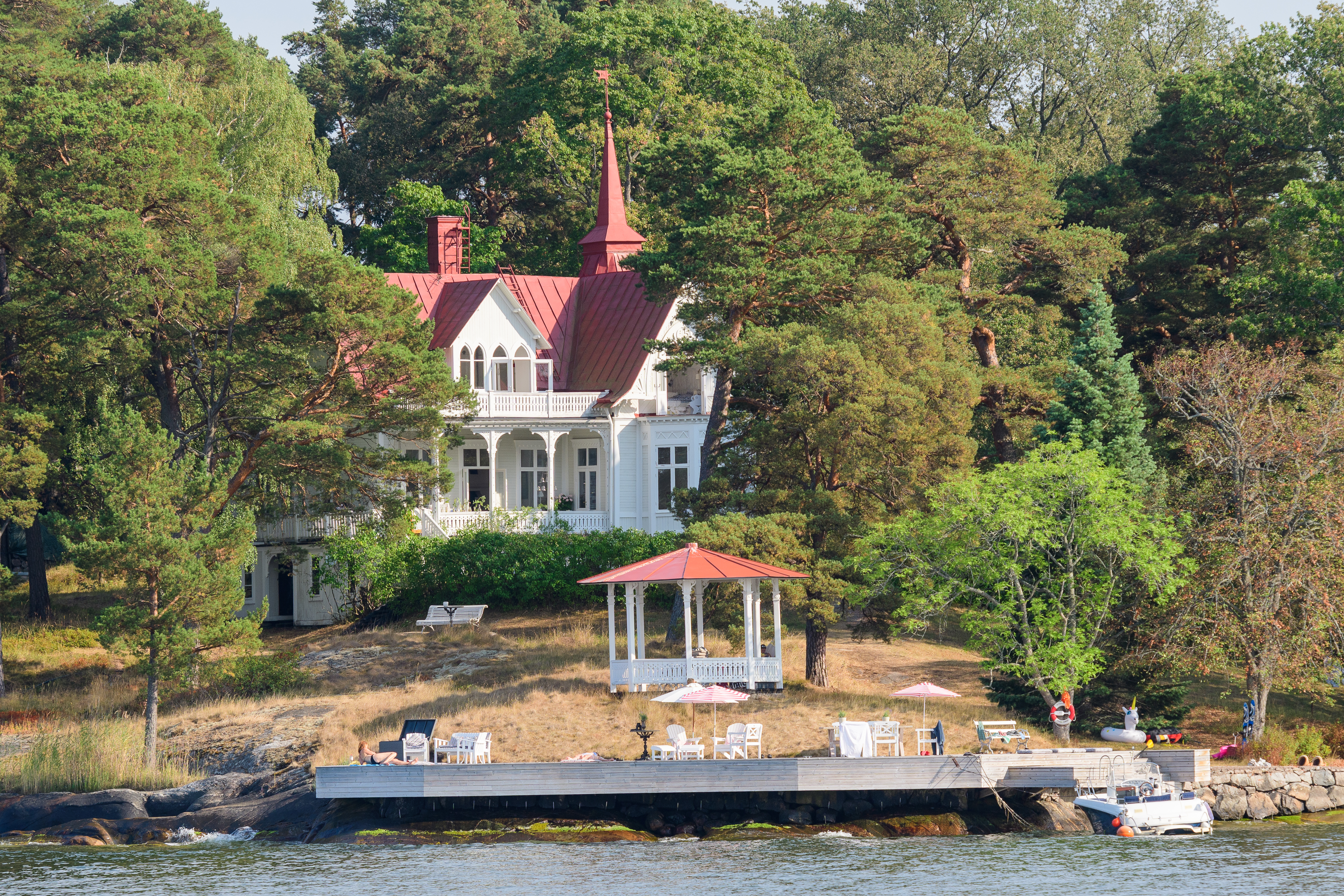
The heritage-listed Villa Ottarsberg
