= Veryday =

Swedish industrial design consultancy

- Formerly: Design Gruppen (1969–1971), Ergonomi Design (1972–1979), Ergonomi Design Gruppen (1979–2000), Ergonomidesign (2001–2012)
- Industry: Industrial design
- Founded: 1969
- Founder: Maria Benktzon, Sven-Erik Juhlin, Henrik Wahlforss
- Defunct: 2024
- Parent: McKinsey & Company (starting 2016)

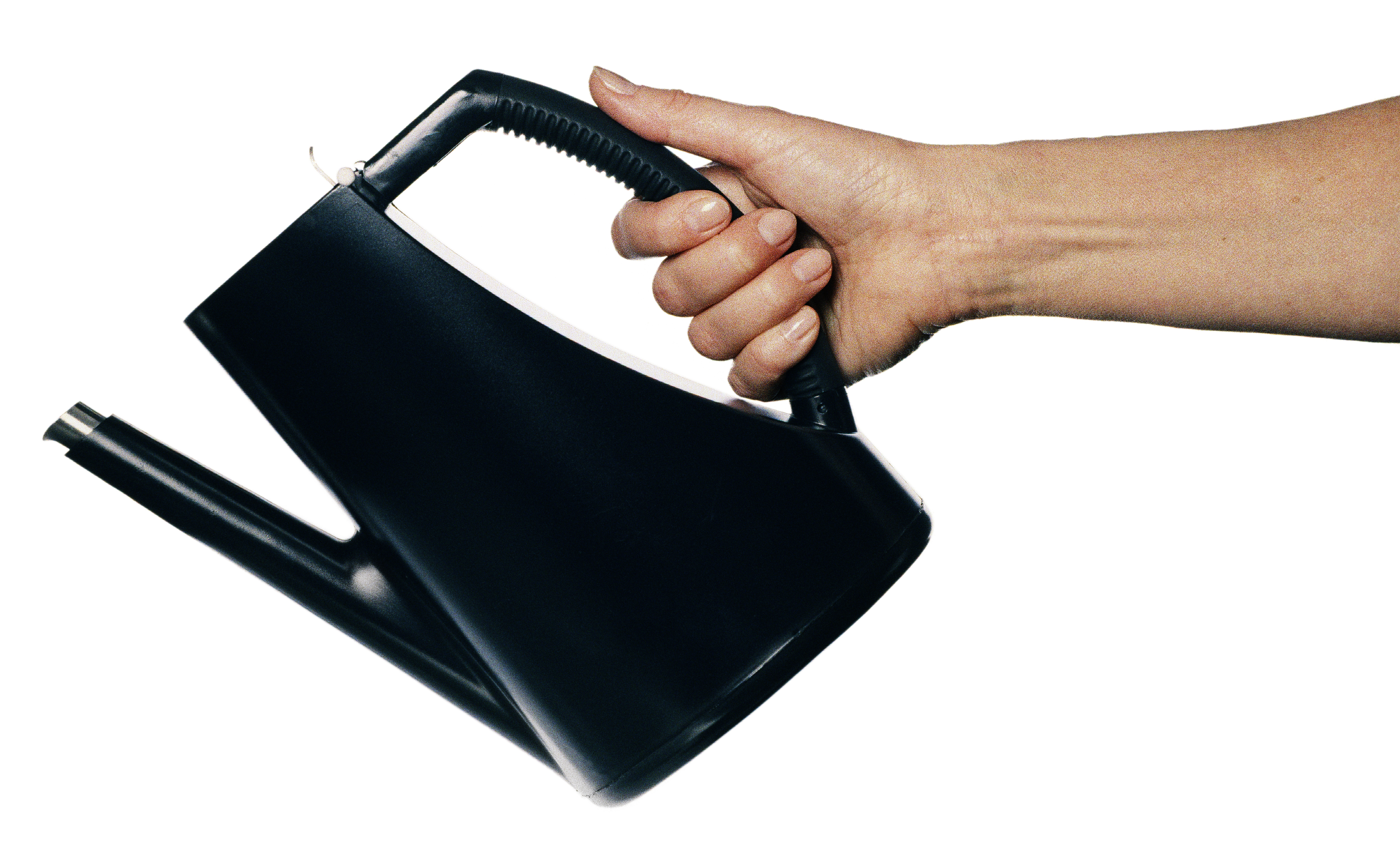
SAS coffee pot (1988) by Ergonomi Design Gruppen, Maria Benktzon, Sven-Erik Juhlin

Veryday was a Swedish industrial design consultancy, headquartered in the Bromma area of Stockholm, with additional studios in New York City, Singapore, Dubai, and London. It was formally named Ergonomi Design Gruppen (English: Ergonomic Design Group) and often referred to as Ergonomidesign; in 2012 the firm adopted the name Veryday. In November 2016, Veryday became part of McKinsey & Company, and today operates under the name "McKinsey Design." In 2024 McKinsey & Co announced that they are closing down the Veryday studio.

The company produced more than 350 patents and won more than 240 design awards. In BusinessWeek's 2008 ranking of leading design agencies, Veryday tied as number 4 in the world. Veryday won the Red Dot "Design Team of the Year" award in 2014.

== Design Gruppen, Ergonomi Design Gruppen (1969–2012) ==
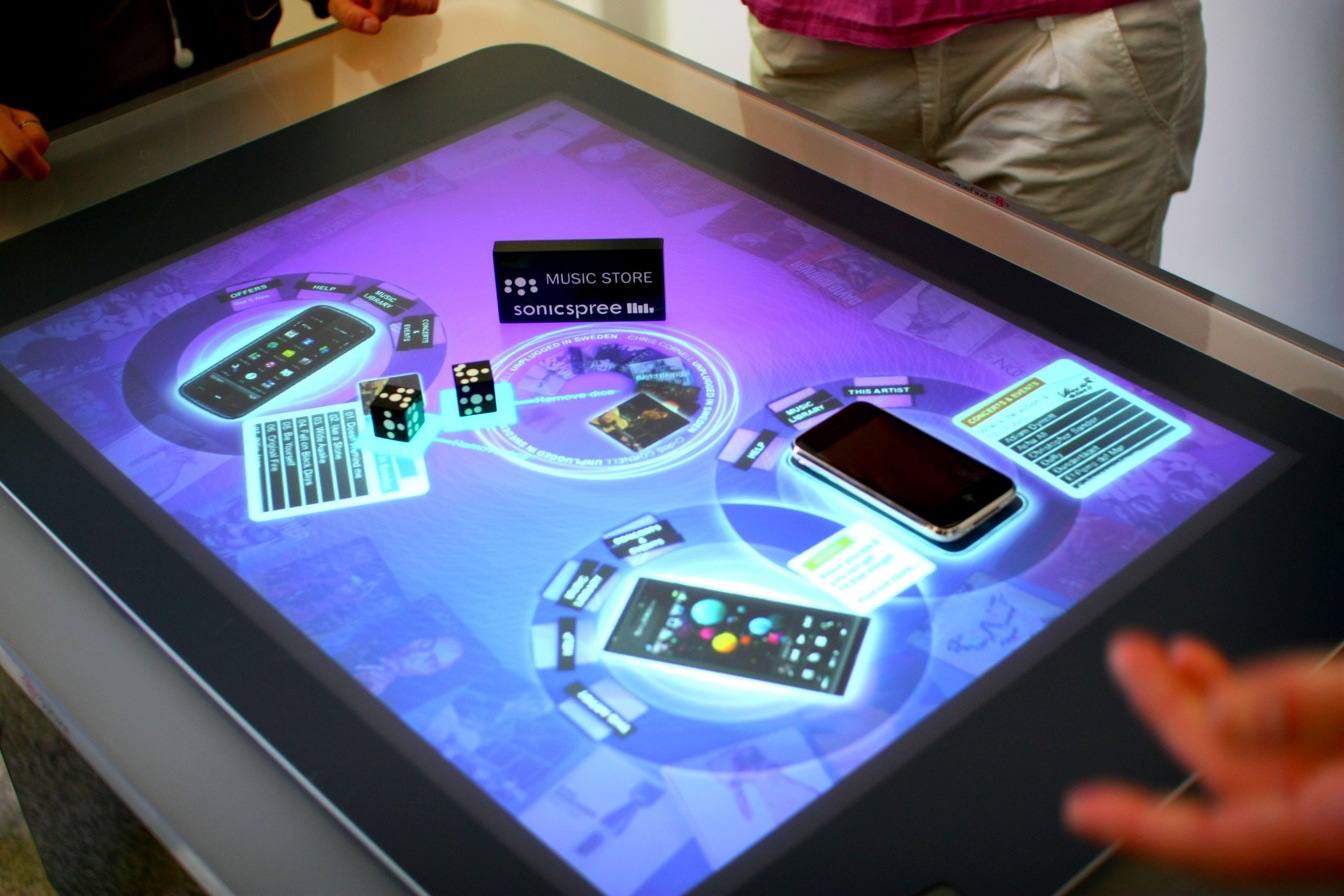
Sonic Spree (2009) game app on the Microsoft Surface table

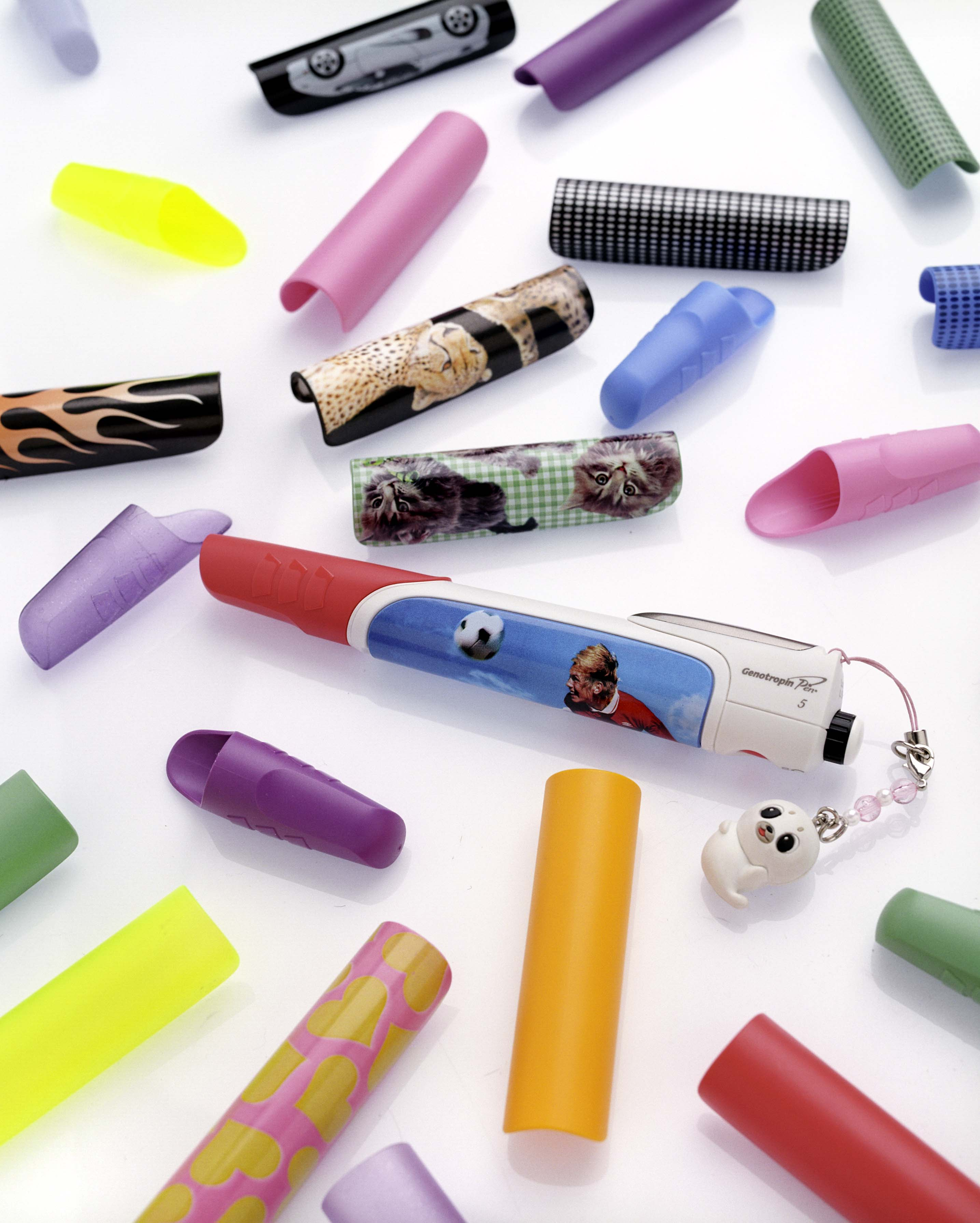
Genotropin Injection Pen (2003) for Pfizer

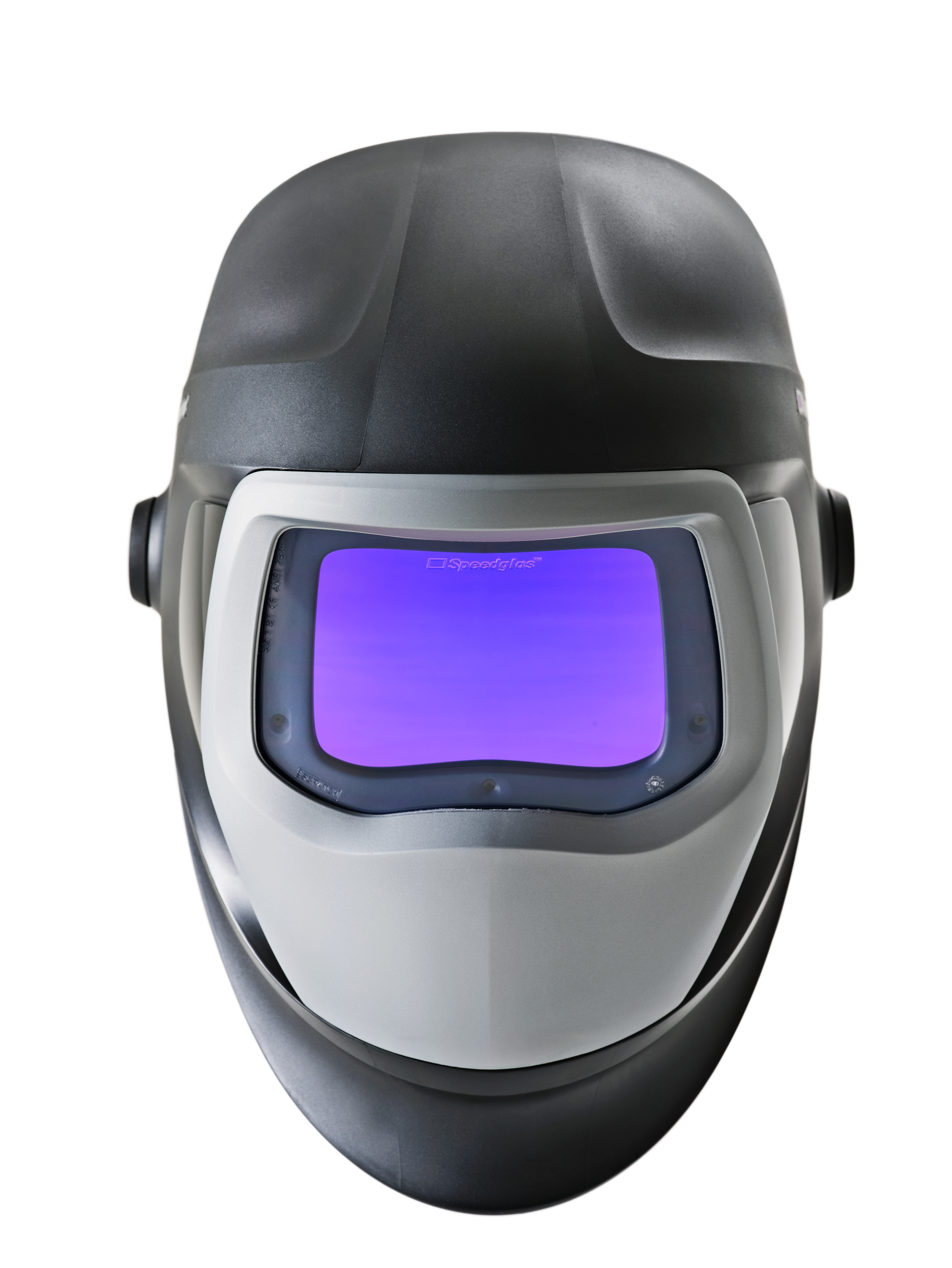
Speedglas 9100 welding helmet (2008), developed for 3M

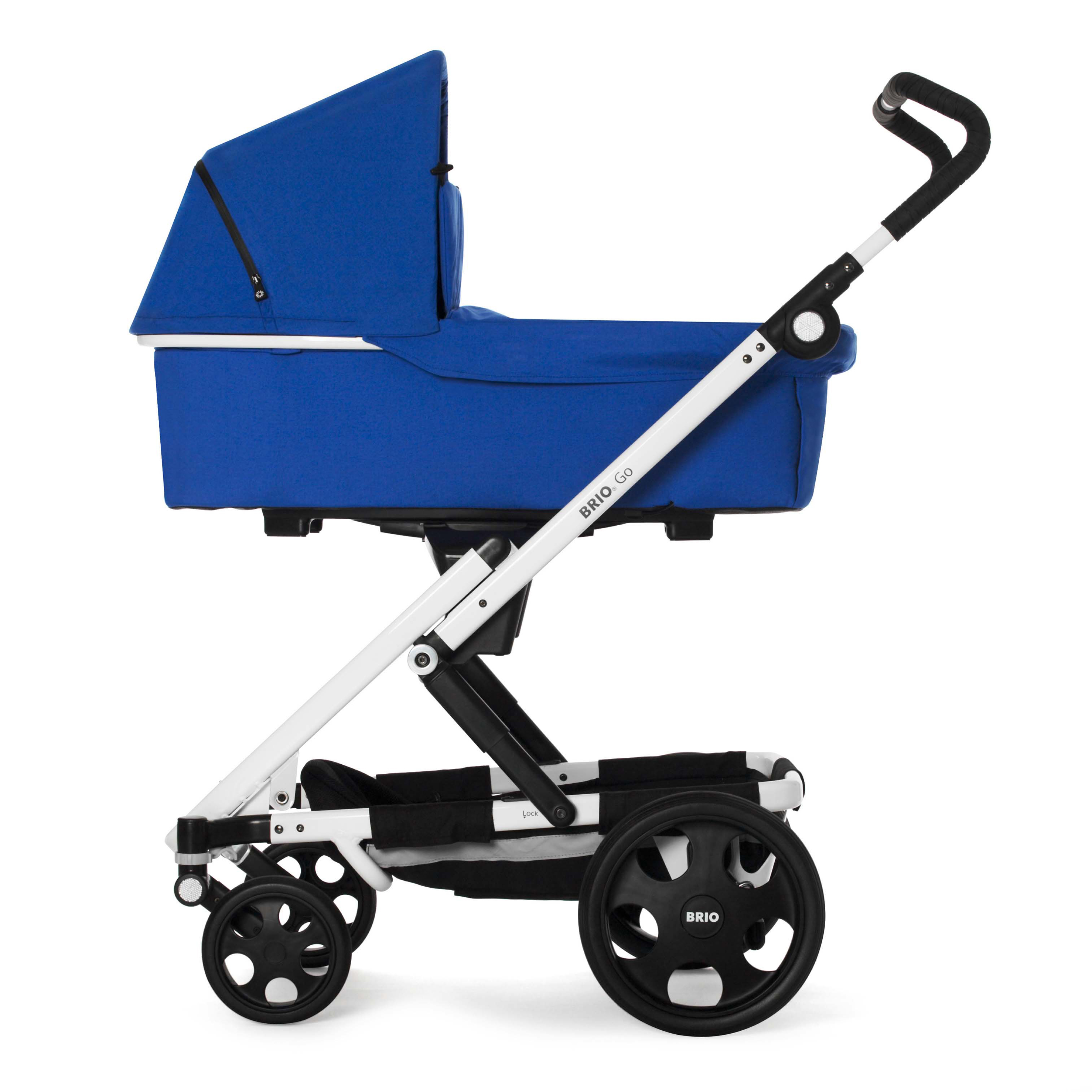
Brio Go (2008) stroller

The company was founded as Design Gruppen in 1969 by Maria Benktzon, and Sven-Erik Juhlin. Among the earliest design collaborations were with ESAB, Flygt, AGA and The Cooperative Union.

Two years later the designer Henrik Wahlforss and his firm Ergonomi Design moved into the same location in the old glue factory in Traneberg outside Stockholm. Ergonomi Design specialized in working with disabled facilities and other inclusive design projects. The two companies merged into a single company in 1979; the new company, Ergonomi Design Gruppen, moved a year later into a converted chapel in Bromma outside Stockholm, from where it still operates. The company was run as co-operative with a rolling CEO and general meetings.

In the early 1970s, assistive devices and products would become an important area of specialization for Ergonomi Design Gruppen. In 1972 two of the founders, Maria Benktzon and Sven-Erik Juhlin, carried out ergonomic and physiological studies to investigate the grip of products such as bread knives and saws. This led to pioneering achievements to raise the standards of facilities for the disabled. The result was a wide range of ergonomically designed objects that draw great international attention for RFSU Rehab, Bahco, BabyBjörn, Pfizer and many others.

Among the company's most high-profile projects was a drip-free coffee pot for Scandinavian Airlines (SAS) designed in 1987, by Maria Benktzon and Sven-Eric Juhlin. The pot has been produced more than 500,000 times and is used by over 30 airlines worldwide. The pot was soon followed by an ergonomically designed service set and a juice jug.

Many products designed by the company are represented at the Swedish National Museum, the Museum of Modern Art in New York, and the Design Museum in London.

== Veryday (2012–2016) ==
In 2012 the company opened a New York City location, and changed its name to Veryday. Around the same time, it began broadening its service offerings to encompass interaction design, service design, design strategy, business innovation and design research. In 2016 the company had about 90+ employees and 5 locations around the world.

In late 2016 the company was acquired by the management consulting firm McKinsey & Company, and ceased to exist as an independent entity. Today, what remains of Ergnomi Design Gruppen and Veryday operates under the McKinsey Design brand.

== Products and services ==
Veryday worked across industries and verticals, including life sciences, consumer electronics, sports, children's design, vehicle design, and construction tools.

With the life sciences being one of the major industries for Veryday, the company developed several medical devices, such as the Genotropin Injection Pen for Pfizer, the ventilator Servo-i for Maquet, and the asthma inflammation monitor Niox Mino for Aerocrine.

Veryday also designed equipment, work protection, and construction machines for industrial enterprises, designing to reduce accidents and musculoskeletal injuries. The company is known for its award-winning welding helmet Speedglas, owned by the American company 3M. The firm designed over 400 products for Bahco, such as a handsaw with exchangeable blades that won a Red Dot Design Award and an IF iF product design award in 2009. They received the Red Dot Award "Best of the Best" in 2007 and IDEA, International Design Excellence Award Gold Award in 2009.

== Clients ==
3M, ABB, Absolut Vodka, Aerocrine, ArjoHuntleigh, Assa Abloy, AstraZeneca, BabyBjörn, Bahco, BRIO, Cochlear, Doro, DuPont, Ejendals, Electrolux, Elekta, Etac, Flir, Gambro, Gillette, Haglöfs, Hitachi, Hultafors, IKEA, Ikonoskop, Koenigsegg, Lilleborg, Novo Nordisk, Nycomed, Novartis, Peak Performance, Pepsi Co, Pfizer, Procter & Gamble, Roche Sony, Samsung Spotify SAS, Siemens, Telia, Toyota, Unilever, Volvo

== Sources ==
- Svenska formrebeller 1960- och 70-tal, Historiska Media, 2008
- Scandinavian Design, Taschen GmbH, Cologne, 2002
- Swedish Industrial Design, Norstedts, 1997
- Function Rules, Arvinius Förlag, 2006
