= Berndt August Hjorth =

Swedish businessman

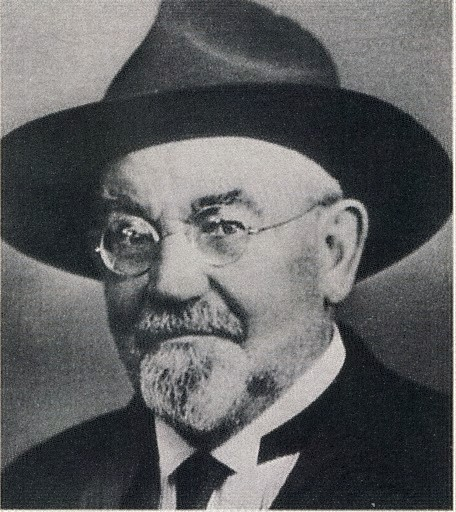
- Berndt August Hjorth
- Born: 1862; Finland
- Died: 1937 (aged 74–75); Stockholm, Sweden
- Occupation: Businessman
- Known for: Bahco Group founder

Berndt August Hjorth (1862 in Finland – 1937 in Stockholm) was a Swedish businessman and the founder of Bahco group.

Berndt August Hjorth came to Sweden in 1881. In 1889 he opened a tool and machinery shop in Stockholm, BA Hjorth & Co, incorporated as a shareholder company in 1916 and in 1954 renamed Bahco. The following year, he made an exclusive contract with Johan Petter Johansson to market his invention, an adjustable spanner.

In 1892, Hjorth acquired the sole rights to another Swedish invention, the Primus stove, patented by Frans Wilhelm Lindqvist. In 1918, Hjorth acquired the Primus factory on Lilla Essingen island in western Stockholm.

In Stockholm, Hjorth lived at Villagatan 15 in Villastaden, a wealthy part of Östermalm. In the early 1930s, he built his own "Villa Hjorth" in Diplomatstaden, also in Östermalm.

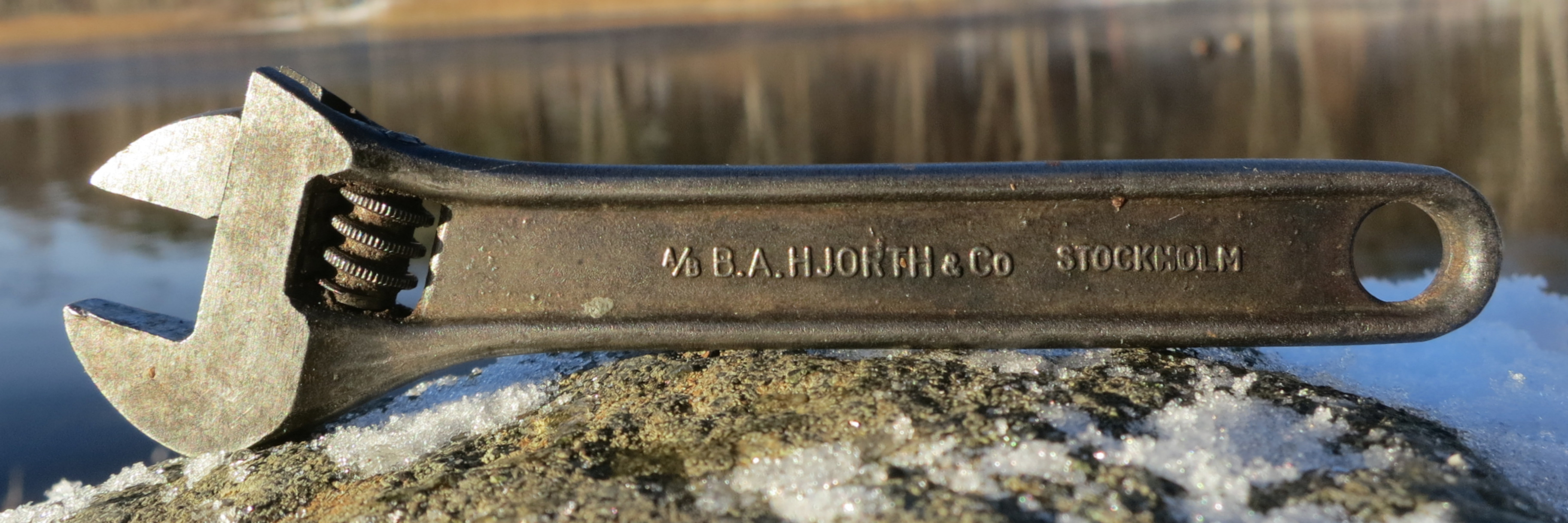
An adjustable spanner by B. A. Hjorth & Co
