= Granholmen, Vaxholm Municipality =

Island in the Stockholm archipelago and Vaxholm municipality, Sweden

Granholmen
- Location within Stockholm Location within Sweden Location within European Union
- Coordinates: 59°22′36.5″N 18°18′7.6″E
- Country: Sweden
- Province: Uppland
- County: Stockholm County
- Municipality: Vaxholm Municipality
- Time zone: UTC+1 (CET)
  - Summer (DST): UTC+2 (CEST)

Granholmen, or Västra Granholmen, is an island in the Stockholm archipelago in Sweden. It is situated in the Höggarnsfjärden waterway to the south of Vaxholm and Karlsudd and north of Stora and Lilla Höggarn. Administratively, it is in Vaxholm Municipality and Stockholm County.

Granholmen has no road connection to the mainland or other islands. It is served throughout the year by passenger ships of the Waxholmsbolaget, which call at a pier at the eastern end of the island, providing a connection to Vaxholm town and Stockholm city.

The neighbouring island is Edlunda, which was previously called Östra Granholmen. The two islands were originally named after Erik and Carl Fredrik Granholm, who bought them in the 1860s.

== Gallery ==
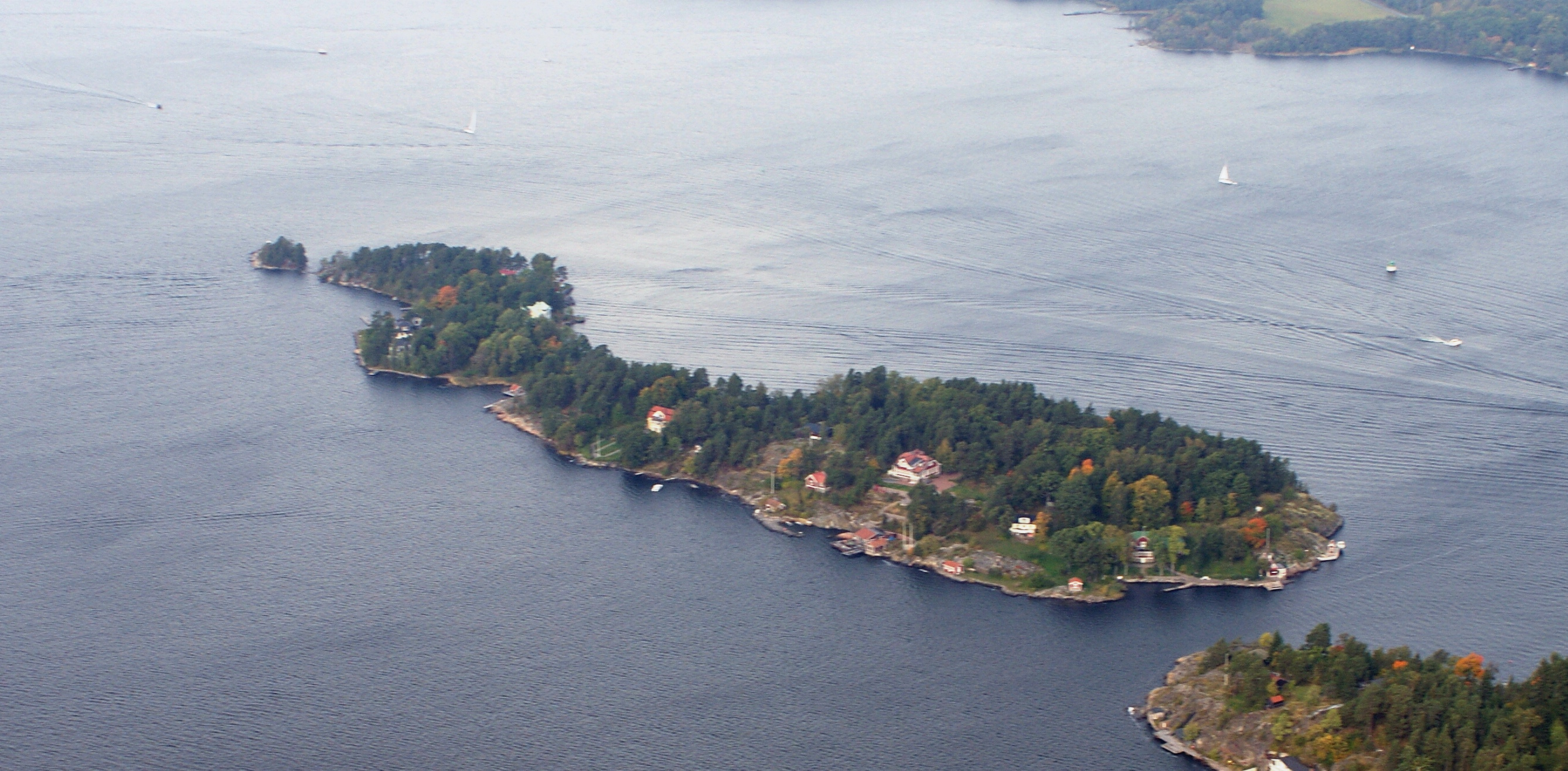
Aerial view of Granholmen, seen from the southeast. Edlunda, formerly Östra Granholmen, is on the right in the picture.

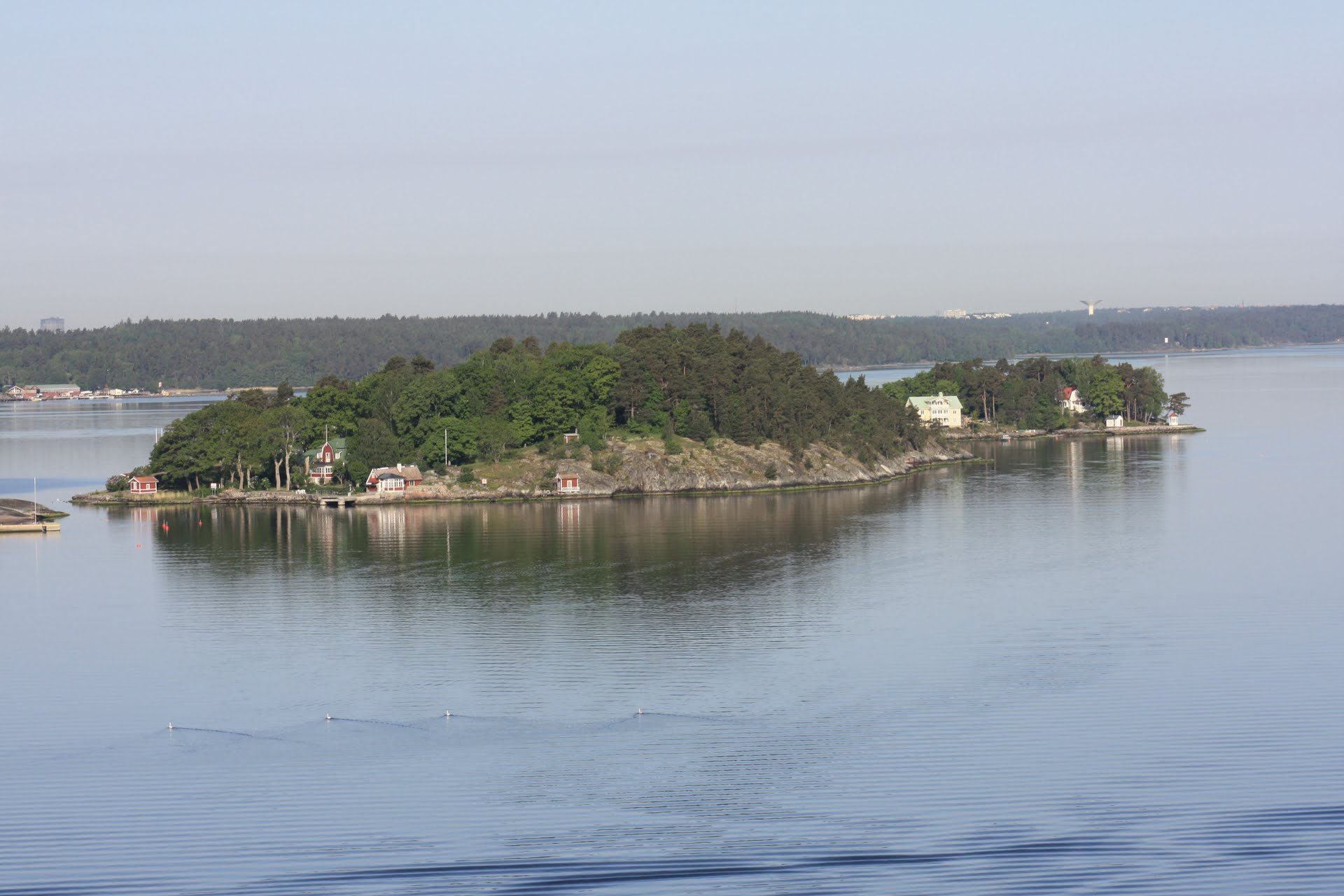
View of Granholmen, seen from the east.

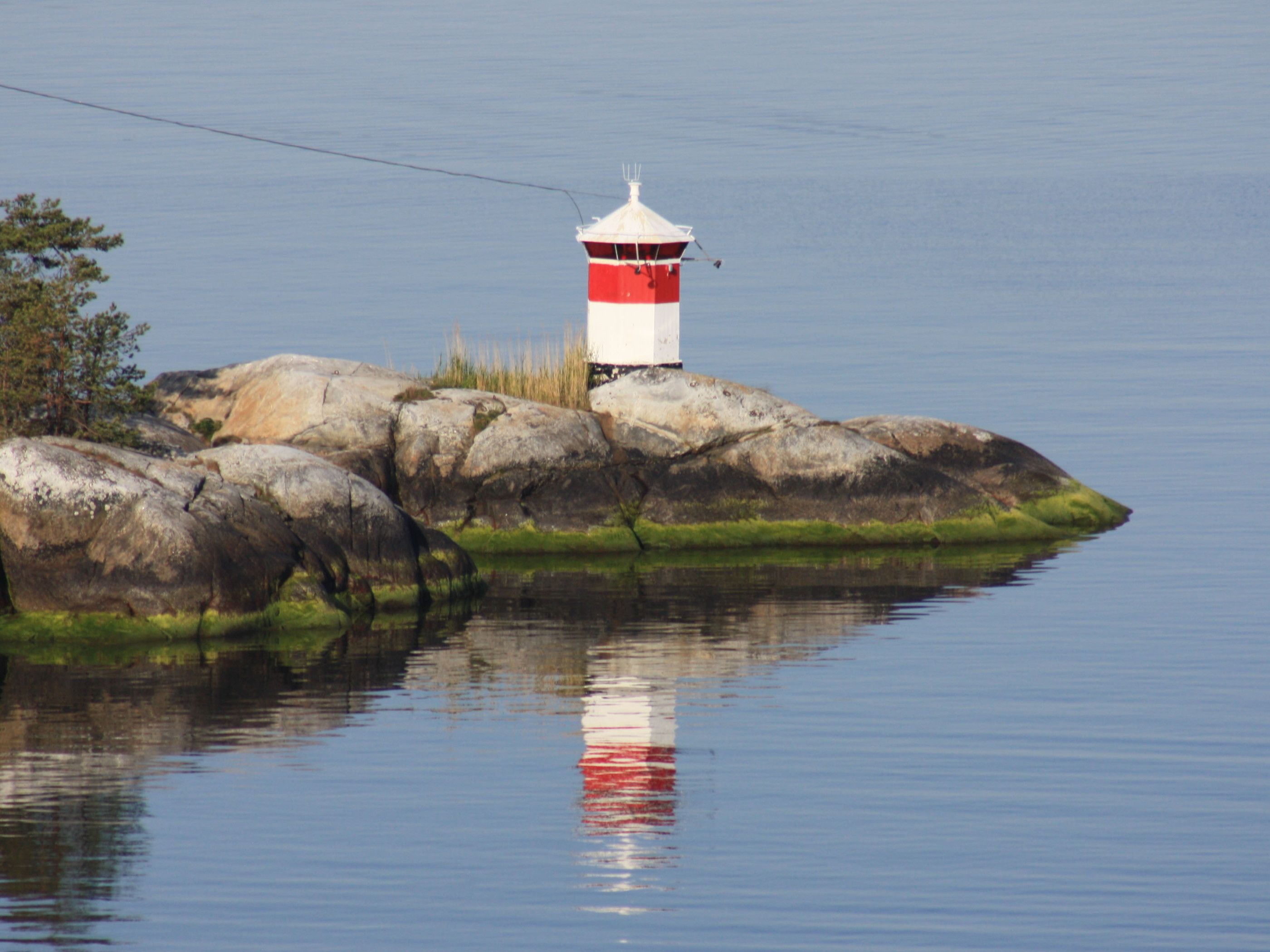
Granholmen lighthouse, at the western end of Granholmen.
