= Primus AB =

Portable Stove Manufacturer

- Industry: Portable Cooking Devices
- Founded: 1892; 134 years ago
- Founder: Frans Wilhelm Lindqvist; Johan Viktor Svenson
- Headquarters: Stockholm, Sweden
- Owner: Silva Group (2023–present)
- Website: https://primusequipment.com/

Primus AB is a manufacturer of portable cooking devices and outdoor stoves based in Stockholm, Sweden. On 28 April 2023, Fenix Outdoor International AG announced that it had sold Primus AB to Silva Group.

== History ==
The firm was founded in 1892 by Frans Wilhelm Lindqvist and Johan Viktor Svenson. They were the developers of its initial product, the Primus stove, the first portable and soot-free kerosene stove. The first units were sold mainly to women who operated street market shops (stallholders) in Stockholm.

Explorers then discovered the value in having a portable stove for their expeditions. For example, on Salomon August Andrée’s 1897 North Pole expedition, he cooked on a Primus. Roald Amundsen carried a Primus stove with him on his venture to the South Pole in 1911. On 5 July 1928, a Junkers trimotor dropped a Primus stove to the survivors of Umberto Nobile’s airship "Italia", who were camped on the pack ice of the North Pole. The testimony of engineer Felice Troiani, in charge of the kitchen of the "red tent", illustrates how much this product improved the lives of the survivors awaiting rescue:

On that vast ice field, on the dry parquet, with fresh water at hand, with the Primus and with a pot from Lundborg that had reduced the labors of cooking to nothing, it felt as if we were on vacation.

In 1953, Sir Edmund Hillary and Tenzing Norgay relied on Primus stoves during their first ascent of Mount Everest.

Today, Primus stoves and lanterns are sold in over 70 countries. The stoves are made in Primus' factory in Tartu, Estonia.

== Product range ==
Primus offers products for cooking, heating and lighting, although the focus is still on stoves. They make LPG (liquified petroleum gas) stoves for backpacking and camping, multi-burner camping stoves to high-end multifuel expedition stoves. Primus also produces lanterns, vacuum bottles and accessories such as cutlery, cookware and other camping equipment.

One of the most successful stoves in the Primus range is the OmniFuel. When introduced in 2001, it was the first stove to burn LPG, white gas, kerosene, jet fuel and even diesel. It has received awards from specialist outdoor and mountaineering magazines.

In 2007, Primus introduced its first Eta Power stoves. The Greek letter Eta stands for “efficiency” in physics. The Eta series consists of various cooking systems (burner, windshield, pots with heat exchanger) that increase fuel efficiency up to twice that of conventional stoves.

In 2012, Primus introduced the OmniLite stove, a lighter and more compact version of the OmniFuel, optimized for use with Eta Pots.

== Gallery ==
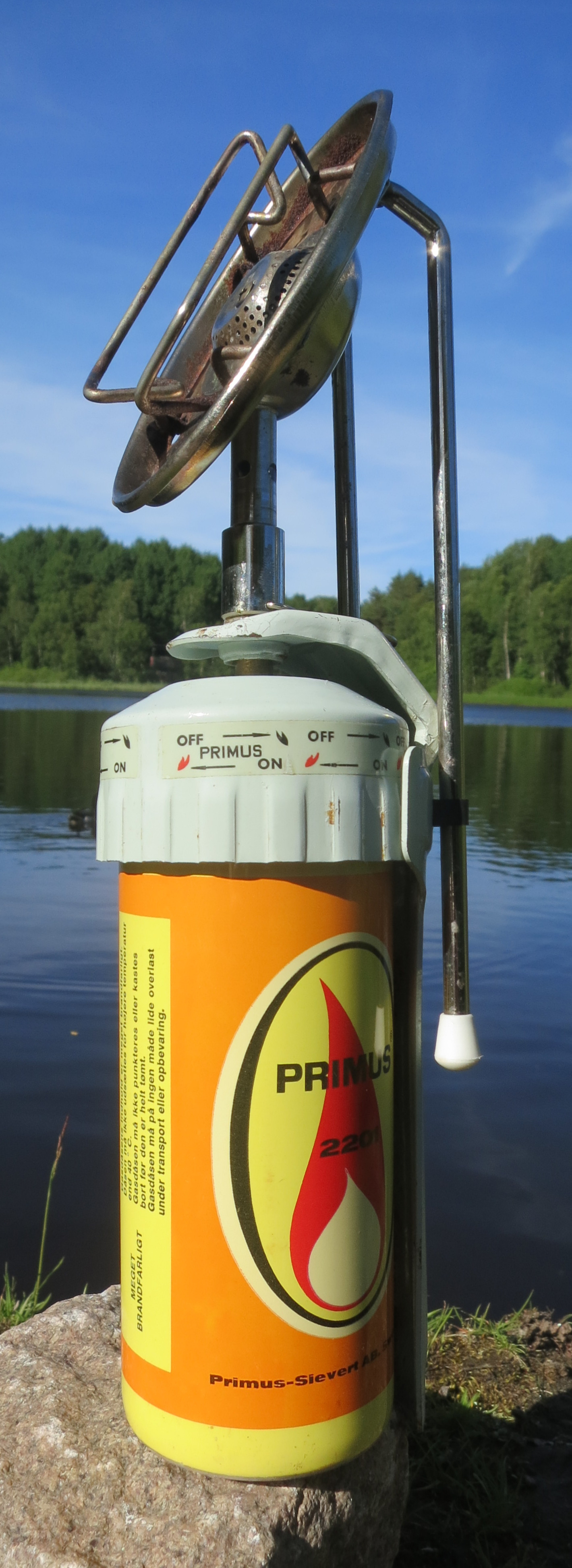
1970s camping stove 2255 'Grasshopper' by Primus AB
