= Primus stove =

Company

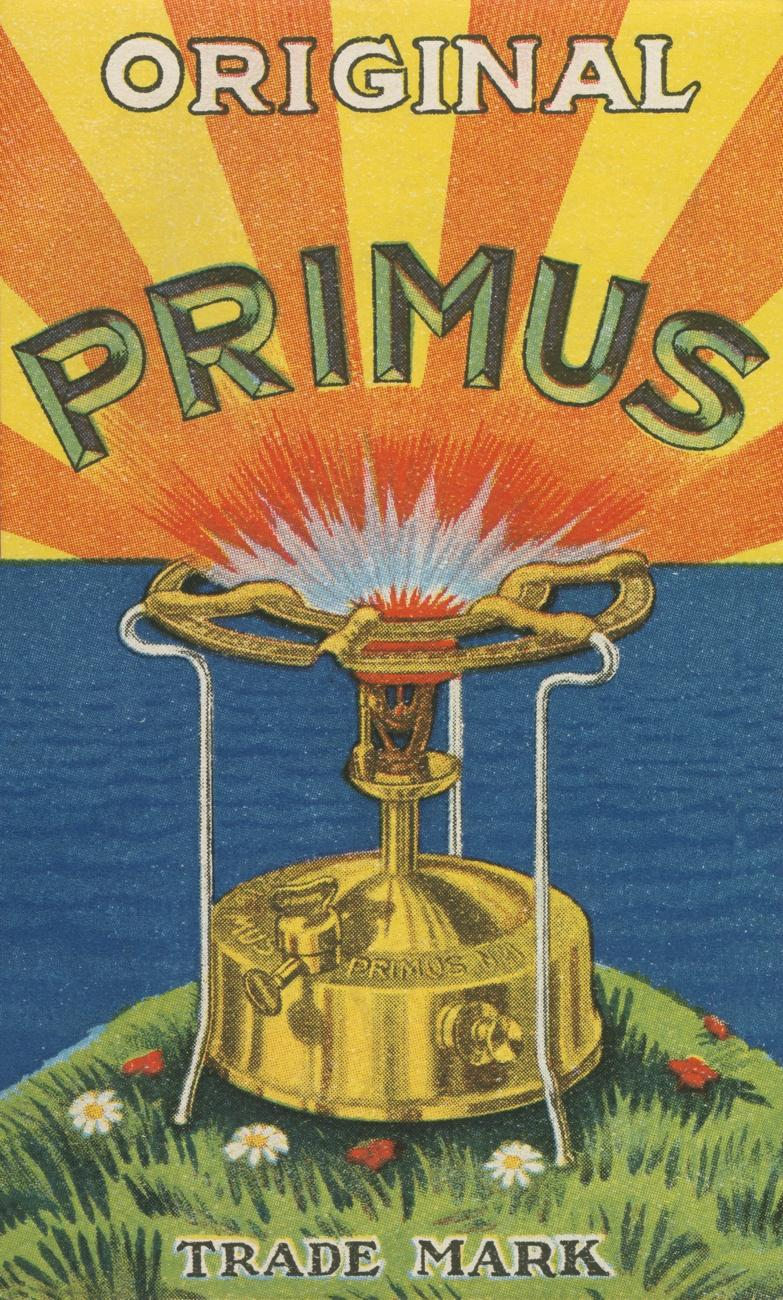
Primus stove model 1 advertising poster

The Primus stove was the first pressurized-burner kerosene (paraffin) stove, developed in 1892 by Frans Wilhelm Lindqvist, a factory mechanic in Stockholm. The stove was based on the design of the hand-held blowtorch; Lindqvist's patent covered the burner, which was turned upward on the stove instead of outward as on the blowtorch. The same year, Lindqvist partnered with Johan Viktor Svenson and established J.V. Svenson's Kerosene Stove Factory for manufacturing the new stoves which were sold under the name Primus. The first model was the No.1 stove, which was quickly followed by a number of similarly designed stoves of different models and sizes. Shortly thereafter, B.A. Hjorth & Co. (later Bahco), a tool and engineering firm begun in Stockholm in 1889, acquired the exclusive rights to sell the Primus stove.

The efficient Primus stove quickly earned a reputation as a reliable and durable stove in everyday use, and it performed especially well under adverse conditions: it was the stove of choice for Fridtjof Nansen's North Pole attempt, Roald Amundsen's South Pole expedition, and Richard Byrd's North Pole expedition. Primus stoves also accompanied George Mallory's ill-fated expedition to Mount Everest in 1924, as well as Tenzing and Hillary's successful one in 1953. While many other companies also made portable stoves of a similar design to the Primus, this style is often generically referred to as a "Primus" stove, regardless of the manufacturer.

== Construction ==
The Primus No. 1 stove, made of brass, consists of a fuel tank at the base, above which is a "rising tube" and the burner assembly. A steel top ring on which to set a pot is held above the burner by three support legs. Other Primus-style stoves may be larger or smaller, but have the same basic design. The No. 1 stove weighs about 2.5 pounds (1.1 kg), and measures about 8.5 inches (220 mm) high with an overall diameter of just under 7 inches (180 mm). The tank, about 3.5 inches (90 mm) high, holds a little over 2 imperial pints (1.1 L) of kerosene and will burn for about four hours on a full tank.

== Principle of operation ==
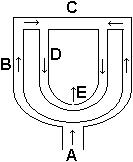
Illustration of Burner Assembly. A: Rising tube (from fuel tank); B: Ascending tube; C: Burner head; D: Descending tube; E: Vapor nozzle. The ascending tubes and descending tubes are at right angles to one another.

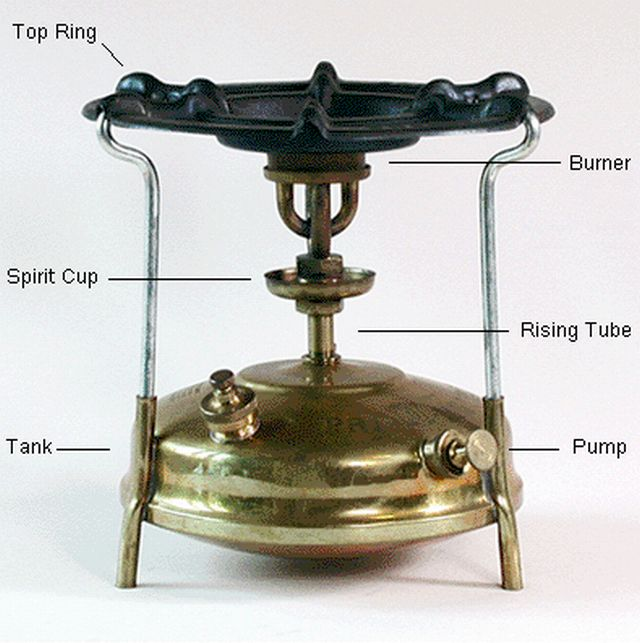
Primus Stove components

To light the stove, the user pours a small amount of alcohol into a circular "spirit cup" just below the burner and lights it to heat the burner assembly. When it is hot, the user pressurizes the tank by means of a small hand pump integrated into the housing, which forces kerosene from the tank up through the rising tube (A) and the ascending pipe (B) to the pre-heated burner head (C), where the fuel is heated and vaporized. The kerosene vapour is then forced under pressure through the descending tube (D) to the vapor nozzle (E); here it sprays through a jet in the middle of the burner, where it mixes with air and burns in a sootless blue flame. The heat from that flame vaporizes more fuel to sustain the process when the spirit cup burns out. The user can pump the tank more to increase the pressure and make the flame larger; turning a small "air screw" (usually located in the filler cap) will release pressure from the tank and make the flame smaller.

If no alcohol is available for lighting, a twist of cloth or even dry grass will form a wick in the spirit cup. Pumping once will dispense a small amount of kerosene to dribble down into the cup which will then light using the wick. As the flame dies down, a further gentle pump will either ignite the main burner or dispense more kerosene into the spirit cup.

Prior to the introduction of the Primus, kerosene stoves were constructed in the same manner as oil lamps, which use a wick to draw fuel from the tank to the burner and which produce a great deal of soot due to incomplete combustion. The Primus stove's design, which uses pressure and heat to vaporize the kerosene before ignition, results in a hotter, more efficient stove that does not soot. Because it did not use a wick and did not produce soot, the Primus stove was advertised as the first "sootless" and "wickless" stove.

== See also ==
- Jetboil
- Portable stove
- Tilley lamp
