= Bogesundslandet =

Peninsula and nature reserve in Vaxholm Municipality, Sweden

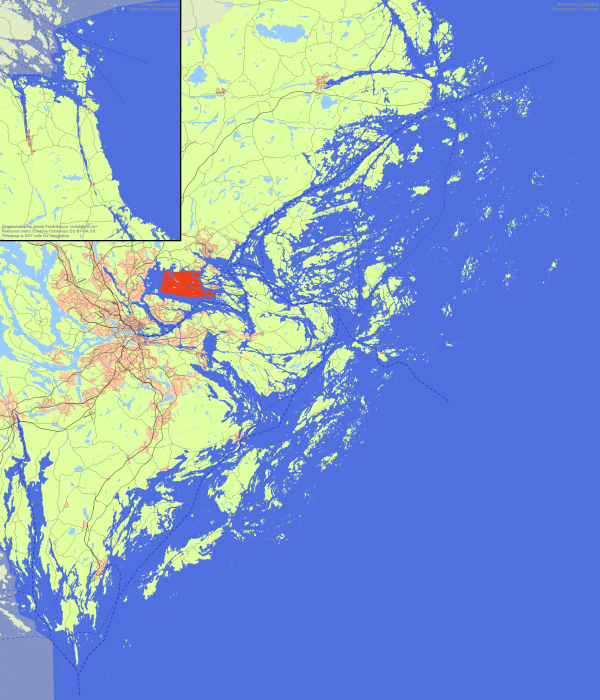

- Location within Stockholm Location within Sweden
- Coordinates: 59°24′N 18°16′E
- Country: Sweden
- Province: Uppland
- County: Stockholm County
- Municipality: Vaxholm Municipality
- Time zone: UTC+1 (CET)
  - Summer (DST): UTC+2 (CEST)

Bogesundslandet is a peninsula in Vaxholm Municipality, Stockholm County, Sweden. Most of the peninsula is occupied by the Bogesundslandet nature reserve.

== The peninsula ==
The Bogesundslandet peninsula is largely surrounded by water, with the Kyrkfjärden in the north-west, Stora Värtan in the west, Askrikefjärden in the south and the multiple waterways and islands of Vaxholm Municipality in the east and north-east. To the north a narrow neck of land connects it to the rest of the Swedish mainland.

At the south-eastern tip of the peninsula is the settlement of Karlsudd and the nearby Bogesund Castle, built by the Brahe family, who at one time owned the entire peninsula. At the western end of the peninsula, the small community and former manor of Frösvik can be found.

The peninsula has a road connection to the Vaxholm urban area via the Pålsundsbron. The road from the bridge continues north across the peninsula, passing the entrances to Karlsudd and Bogesund Castle, to join county road 274 at its northern edge. Other local roads branch off to connect to other parts of the peninsula, including Frösvik.

In the mid-1960s, Bogesundslandet was planned to be developed with housing and a motorway via Lidingö, plans that were later shelved.

== The nature reserve ==
The Bogesundslandet nature reserve was formed in 2015 with the Swedish state as owner and the Swedish Property Agency as manager. The reserve covers an area of 4,341 hectares (10,730 acres), of which 2,899 hectares (7,160 acres) are land and 1,441 hectares (3,560 acres) are water. Of the land area, 2,207 hectares (5,450 acres) are productive forest land.
