= Pålsundsbron, Vaxholm =

Road bridge between Bogesund and Vaxön in Vaxholm, Sweden

Coordinates: 59°23′59.5″N 18°19′25″E

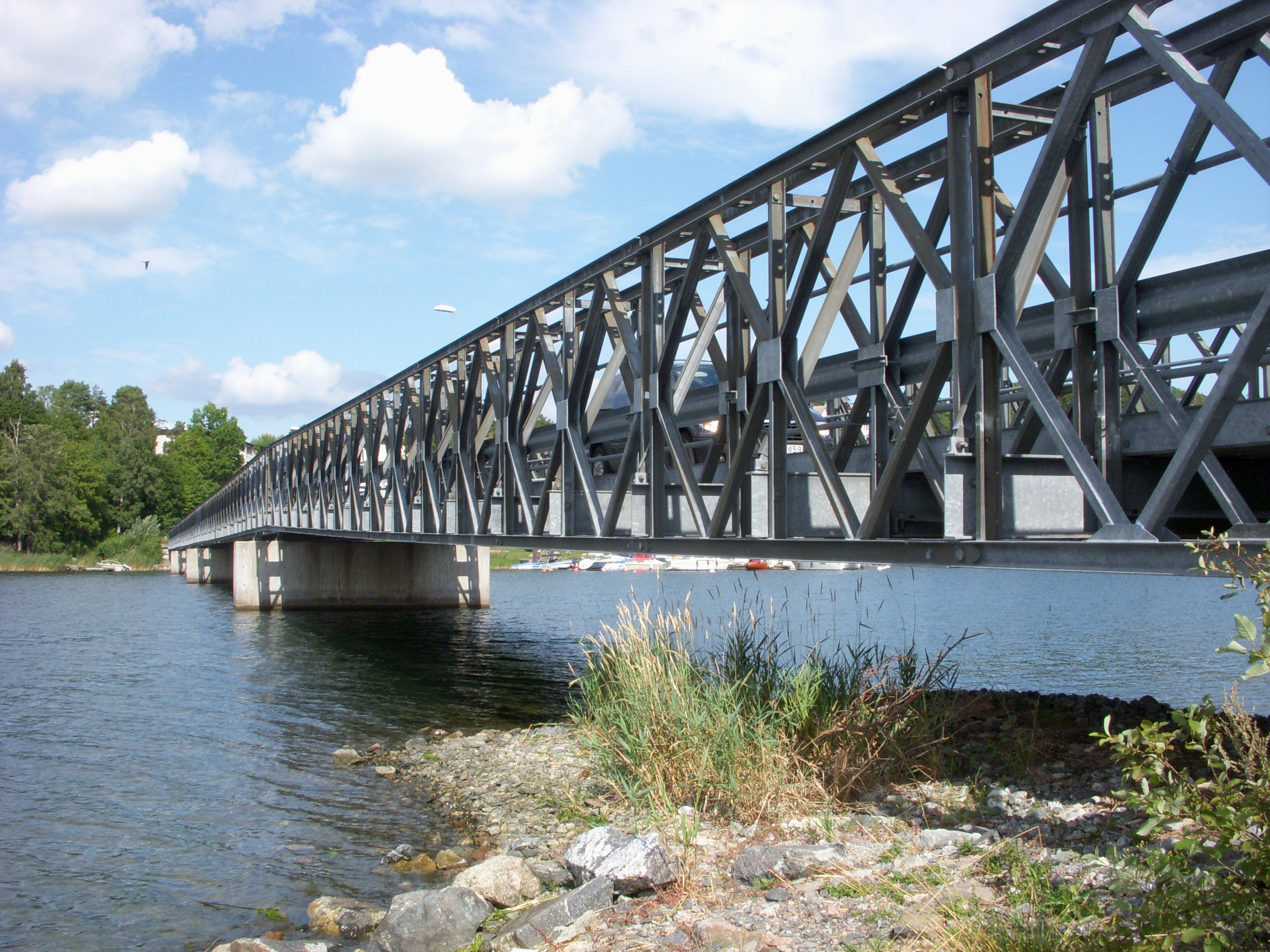
The bridge in 2011 as seen from the Bogesundlandet peninsular

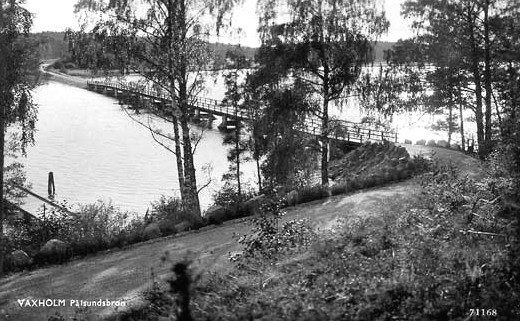
The bridge in the 1930s as seen from Vaxön island

The Pålsundsbron is a road bridge that links the island of Vaxön, and hence the town of Vaxholm, with the Bogesundslandet peninsular to the south of the town. It crosses the Pålsundet strait in the Stockholm archipelago.

The bridge was opened in 1926 and provided the first fixed link between the town of Vaxholm and the Swedish mainland. Since 1965 it has been largely replaced in that role by the wider Vaxholmsbron bridge that links to the island of Kullö to the north-west of the town, carrying county road 274 on its way to the mainland. The Pålsundsbron is still used by local traffic between the town and Bogesundslandet.

The approximately 170-metre (560 ft) long bridge spans the approximately 315-metre (1,033 ft) wide strait. The current bridge rests on three concrete foundations and has one narrow carriageway. The load-bearing structure consists of steel trusses and the navigation clearance is 2.00 metres (6 ft 7 in). Almost 150 metres (490 ft) of the strait's width is bridged with a road embankment that uses an earlier foundation relating to the 18th century Pålsund battery.

After the cold war submarine incursions of the 1980s, a submarine net was installed under the bridge.
