= Maria Benktzon =

Swedish designer

- Born: 1946 (age 79–80); Nyköping, Södermanland, Sweden
- Occupation: designer

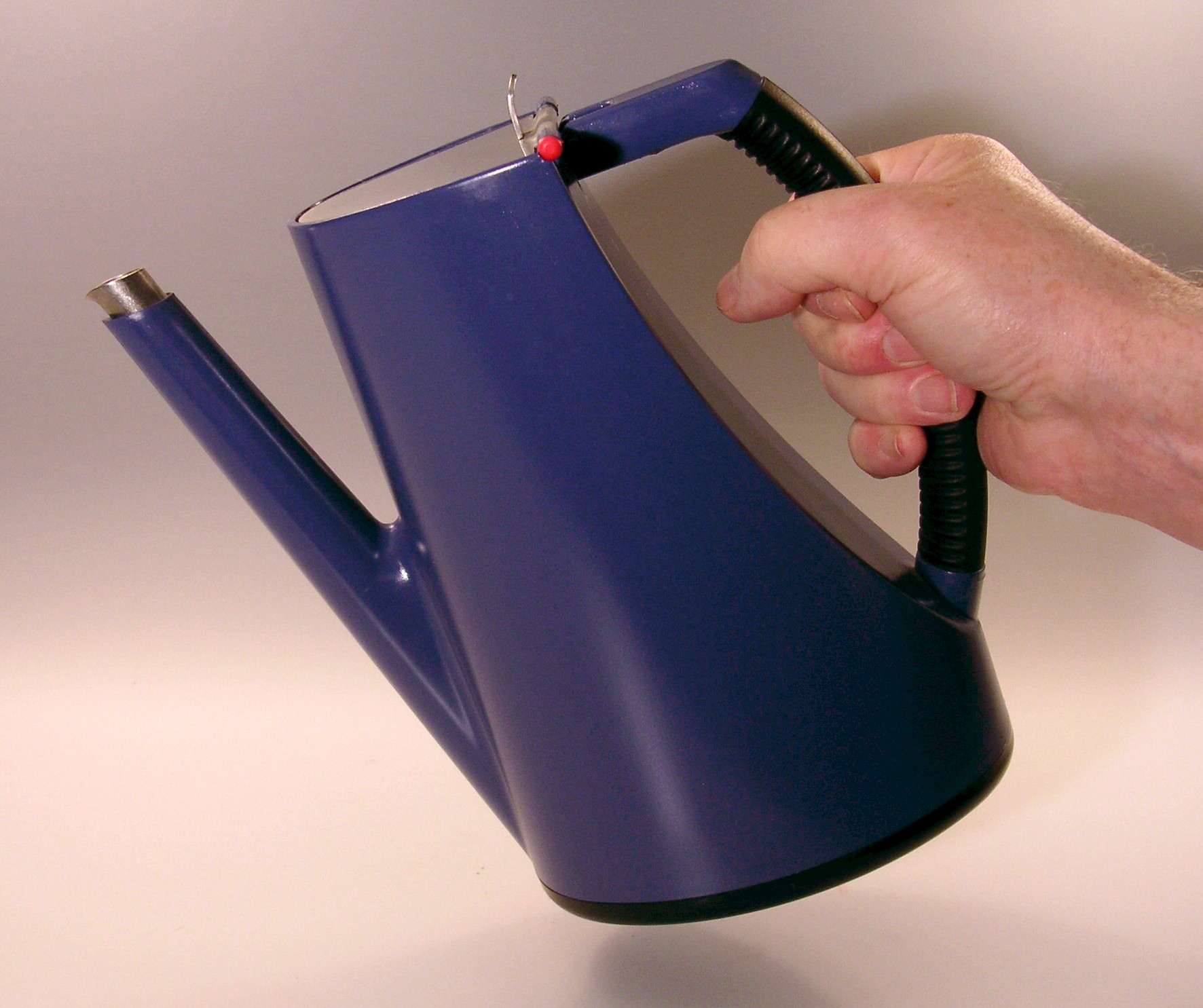
SAS coffee pot (1988), designed with Sven-Eric Juhlin

Maria Benktzon (born 1946) is a Swedish designer, she is known for industrial design with human factors. She is a co-founder of Ergonomi Design Gruppen which later became Veryday, an industrial design consultancy located in Stockholm. The company aimed to design improved everyday objects for the home and work. In November 2016, Veryday joined forces with McKinsey & Company, and today operates under the name "McKinsey Design."

== Biography ==
Maria Benktzon was born in 1946 in Nyköping, Sweden. and studied at the Konstfack University of Arts, Crafts and Design in Stockholm.

In 1968, Benktzon was at a conference and saw a talk given by Victor Papanek concerning design for social good, which inspired her user-centred and inclusive approach to design. In 1969, Maria graduated and joined Henrik Wahlforss’ group, established as Ergonomidesign. In 1972, Maria Benktzon and Sven-Eric Juhlin collaborated with in-depth ergonomic and physiological studies to investigate the grip of knives and bread saws, among other things. Their efforts were able to raise the standards of facilities for the disabled regarding for accessibility and functionality. They designed kitchenware, cutlery and personal hygiene tools; in order to allow people with limited hand strength or movement to continue using these items.

Much of Maria Benktzon’s work has been recognised as landmarks of inclusive design. One of the first products resulting from her collaboration on studies with Sven Eric Juhlin was the world’s first angled kitchen knife, designed for Gustavsberg in 1973. In 1978, they designed the revolutionary Knork Fork, which acts as a knife and fork and was aimed at people incapable of using two hands to eat. In the same year, they also designed the Eat and Drink Plate.

Other notable design objects include the Scandinavian Airlines (SAS) coffee pot (1987), various Tupperware knives, Doro phones, and Ejendals work gloves. Maria's work is in various public museum collections, including at the Museum of Modern Art (MoMA), the Cooper Hewitt, Smithsonian Design Museum, the Röhsska Museum, and the Nationalmuseum.

Maria has received various awards recognising her innovative, ergonomic and consumer-friendly designs of household objects. She was presented with the Ron Mace “Designing for the 21st century” award in 2000, and a lifetime achievement award at the Include Conference in London in 2005. In 2023, Maria received the Lifetime Achievement Award at the DesignEuropa Awards, organised by the European Union Intellectual Property Office (EUIPO).
