= Bogesund Castle =

Building in Vaxholm Municipality, Sweden

- Vaxholm Municipality, Sweden
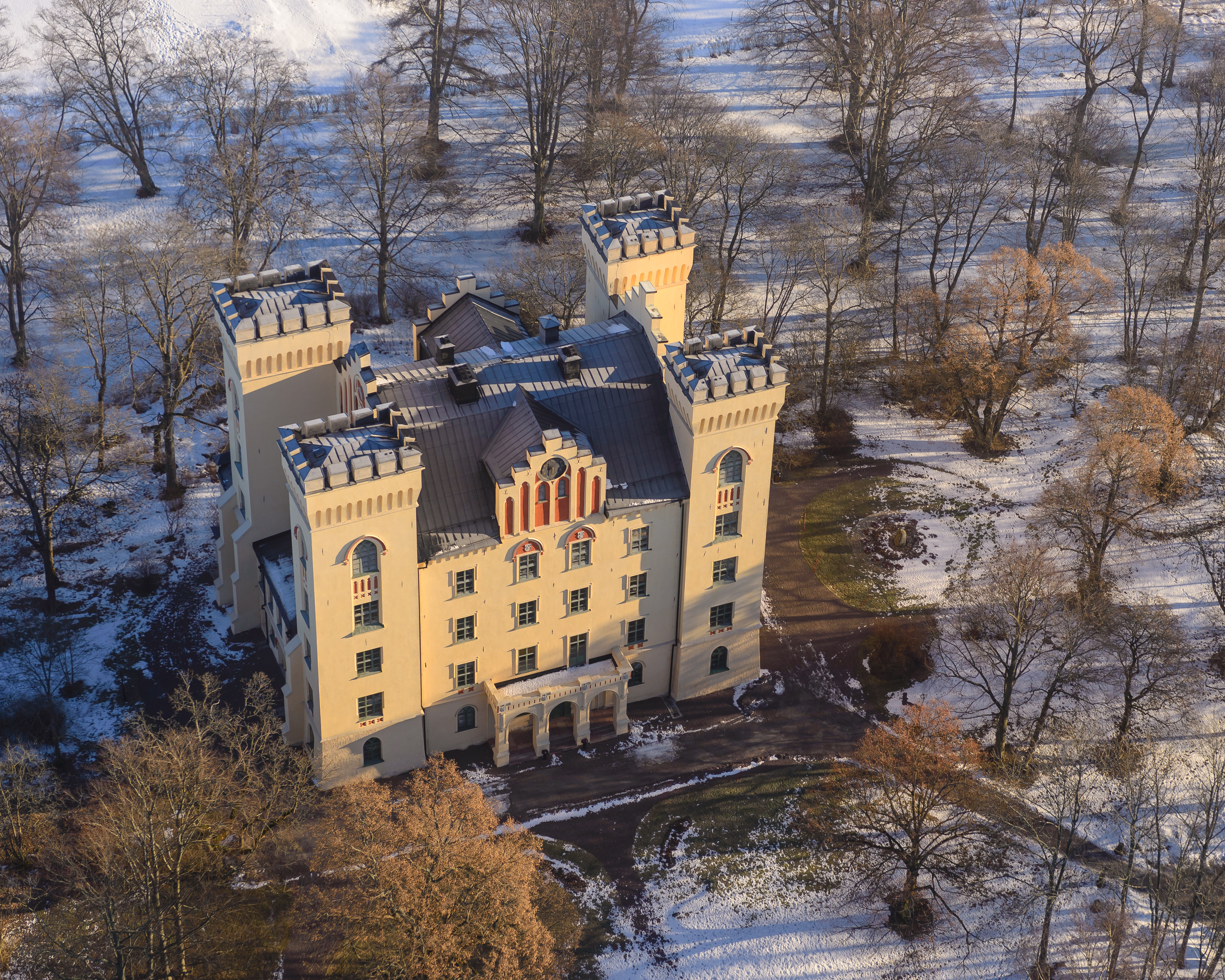

Site information
- Type: Former manor house

Location
- Coordinates: 59°23′36″N 18°17′04″E

Site history
- Built: circa 1640

Bogesund Castle is a former manor in municipality of Vaxholm, about 15 kilometres (9.3 mi) to the east of Stockholm, Sweden. It is located on the Bogesundslandet peninsula, in the center of the Bogesundslandet nature reserve and some 2 kilometres (1.2 mi) west of the settlement of Karlsudd.

The castle style building overlooks the main shipping channel into and out of Stockholm through the Stockholm archipelago.

The building was built in the 1640s on the initiative of Per Brahe the Younger (1602–1680) and was later rebuilt several times. The house received its current appearance with towers and gothic windows in the 1860s according to drawings by the architects Fredrik Wilhelm Scholander (1816–1881) and Thor Medelplan (1832-1863).

The castle is today one of Vaxholms most iconic tourist attractions and can be occasionally visited in the summer months. It can be reached via a local bus service, several hiking trails or a narrow road.

== See also ==
- List of castles in Sweden
