= Vaxholmsbron =

Road bridge in Sweden

Coordinates: 59°24′35.5″N 18°19′00.1″E

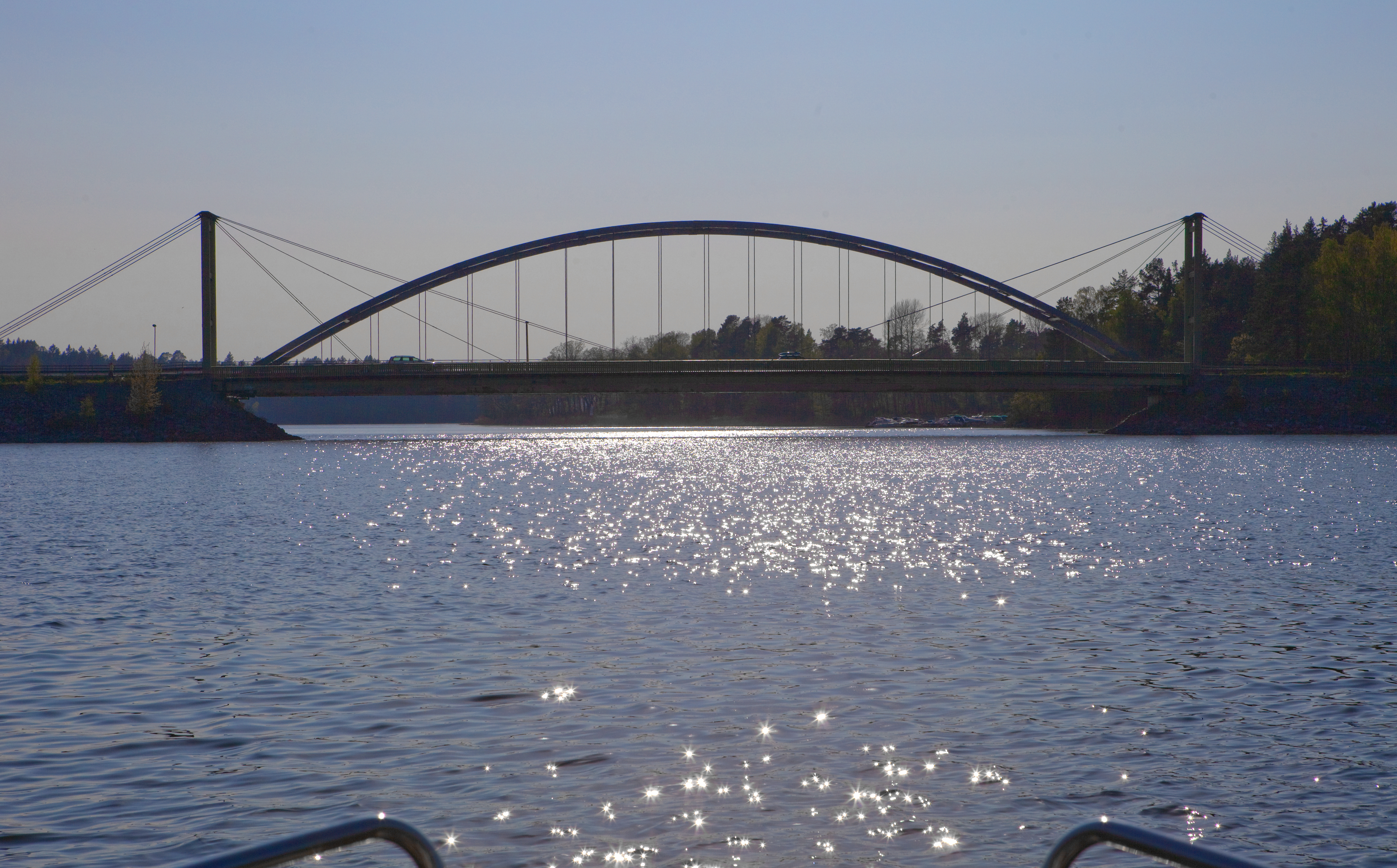
Vaxholmsbron

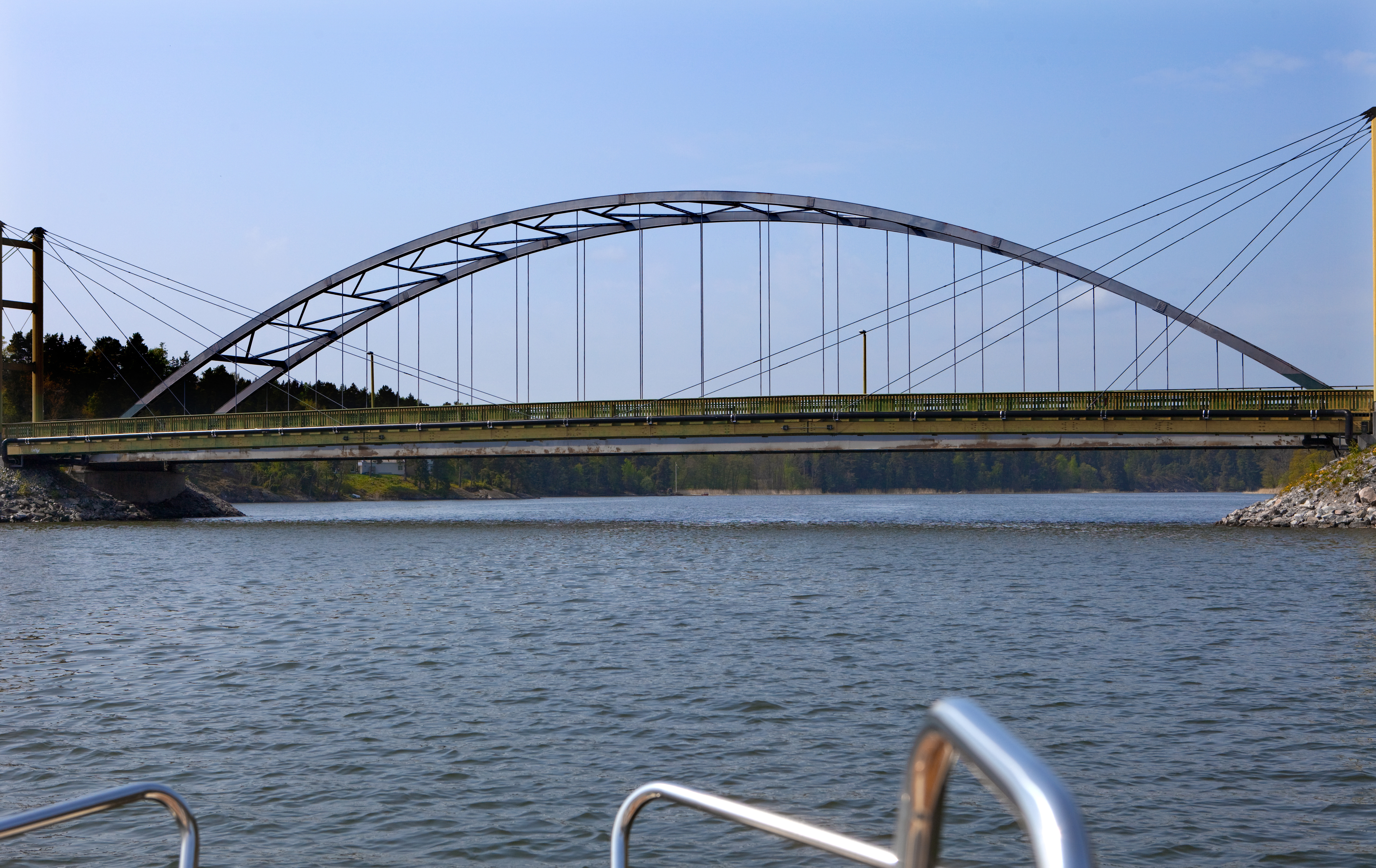
Vaxholmsbron

The Vaxholmsbron is a road bridge that links the island of Kullö with Eriksö which in turn is a part of the island of Vaxön in Sweden's Stockholm archipelago. It carries county road 274 and was opened in 1965, supplementing the earlier Pålsundsbron in providing a connection between the town of Vaxholm and the Swedish mainland.

There are two parallel spans at the site, with the original metal arch road bridge and a cable-stayed pedestrian and bicycle bridge that has Sweden's longest bridge span built of wood. The bridge completes the long pedestrian path between the city centre of Vaxholm and the suburban islands of Kullö and Resarö.
