= Frans Wilhelm Lindqvist =

Swedish inventor (1862-1931)

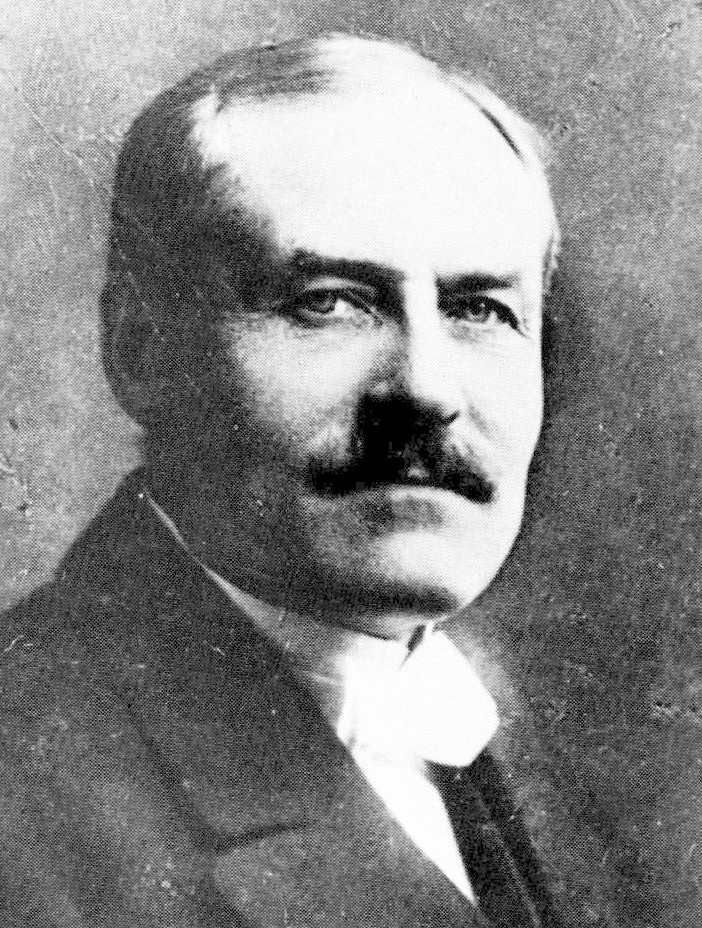
- Born: 1862
- Died: 1931 (aged 68–69)
- Occupation: Inventor

Frans Wilhelm Lindqvist (1862 – 1931) was a Swedish inventor. He designed the first sootless kerosene stove, operated by compressed air. He started a company, Primus, to manufacture and sell the Primus stove.

Lindqvist was born in Västergötland, and lived in Gothenburg for a few years before moving to Stockholm, where he started to work in the AB Separator factory. Inspired by a workmate, he and his brother were able to design a new kind of burner for kerosene stoves. By vaporising the kerosene before it reached the burner, their construction had a sootless, smokeless, hot flame.

Lindqvist started selling his stove on a small-scale basis, but the business soon grew. The product and the company were dubbed Primus. Together with a companion, Johan Victor Svensson, Lindqvist started industrial production in 1892. With the help of marketing firm B.A. Hjorth & Co sales grew, and soon the Primus stove was exported abroad. In the 1910s, more than half a million stoves were made annually. In 1930, more than 500 people worked at the Primus factory, on the Stockholm island Lilla Essingen. Among them were Per Albin Hansson, future Prime Minister of Sweden.

In 1984, the Primus stove was depicted on a Swedish stamp, commemorating the one hundredth anniversary of the Swedish patent system.
