= Bahco =

Swedish tool brand

- Product type: Hand tools
- Current owner: Snap-on
- Introduced: 1886; 140 years ago
- Website: English website

Bahco is a Swedish brand within the hand tool industry, which is now part of SNA Europe, part of Snap-on. Its roots go back to the industrial revolution in Sweden in the late eighteen hundreds, starting with innovations such as the pipe wrench and the modern adjustable wrench. Since then, the product range has expanded with a total assortment of products that today includes over 7,000 hand tools.

== History ==
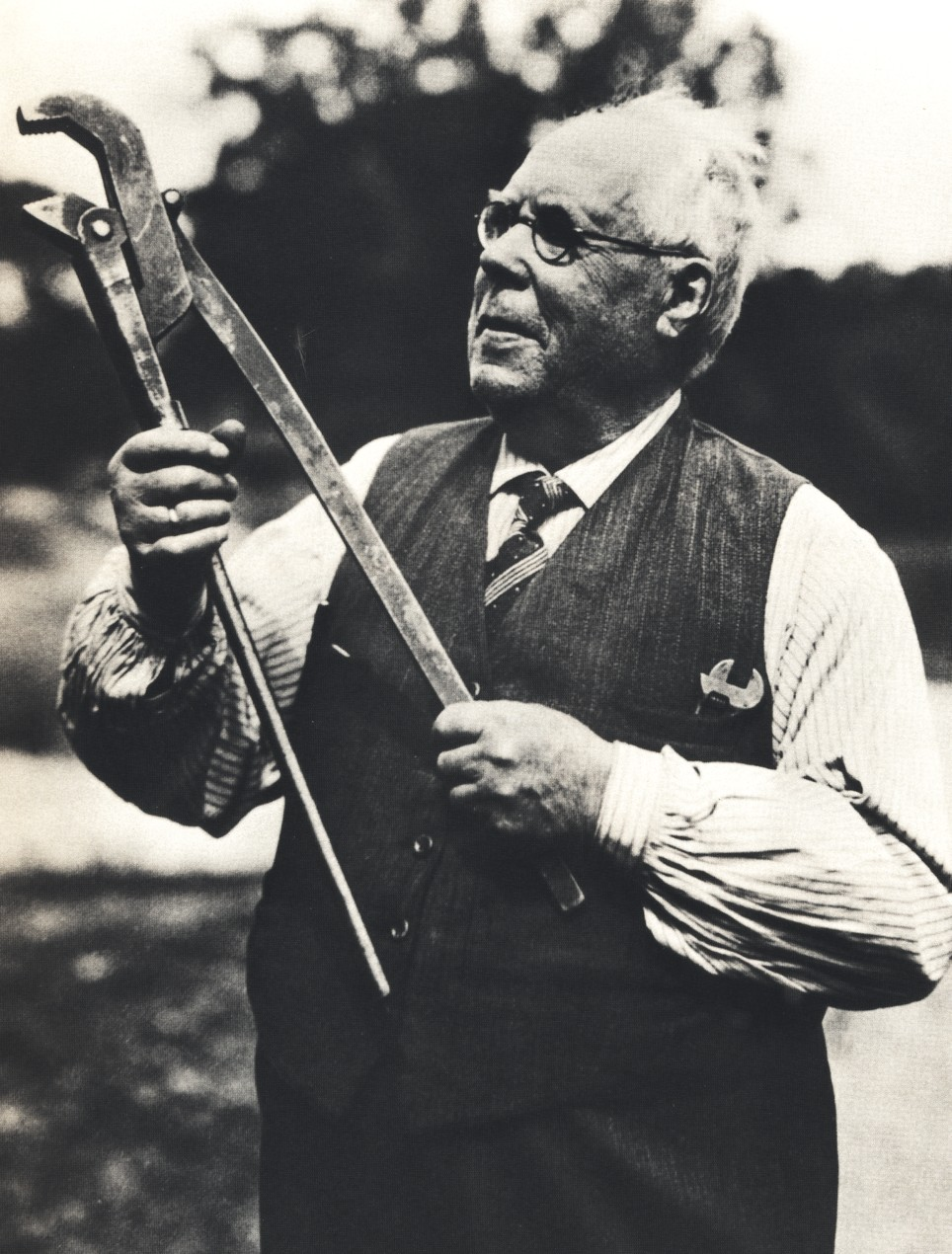
Johan Petter Johansson.

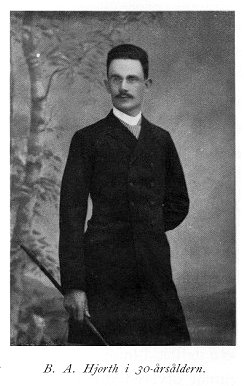
Berndt August Hjorth.

=== The early years (1880s – 1950s) ===
The story of Bahco began in 1886 when the Swedish inventor Johan Petter Johansson (1853–1943) established his company Enköpings Mekaniska Verkstad in Enköping, Sweden. Johan Petter, also known as JP, was an inventor and industrialist. He invented the modern plumber wrench (1888) and adjustable wrench (patents in 1891 and 1892).

In 1890 the company's sales and marketing rights for its products were acquired by the businessman Berndt August Hjorth (1862–1937), founder of BA Hjorth & Co.

In 1916 Johan Petter Johansson sold all his stocks in Enköpings Mekaniska Verkstad to Berndt August Hjorth and the company was converted to an affiliate under the new corporation AB BA Hjorth & Co. However, it was not until 1954 that the company changed its name to AB Bahco (an acronym of the original name BA Hjorth & Co).

Over the following years, Bahco underwent many changes and acquisitions, established its presence abroad and was introduced on the Swedish stock market.

=== Era of changes (1960s – 1980s) ===
During the 1960s and 1970s AB Bahco consisted of four major companies: Bahco Ventilation, Mecamen, Bahco Tools and Bahco Sudamericana. Bahco Ventilation was responsible for products and facilities for air purification, energy and recycling, Mecamen had all the pneumatics, hydraulics and control systems and Bahco Tools controlled the production of hand tools, air tools and hydraulic tools. Bahco Sudamericana was the largest of Bahco's foreign subsidiaries producing hand tools in a factory located in Santa Fe, Argentina.

1991 Bahco Tools was acquired by the industrial corporation Sandvik AB and was renamed Sandvik Bahco. The original factory Bahco Tools in Enköping, Sweden, then became a separate production center within Sandvik's business area Saws & Tools. During this time, major investments were made to increase productivity and to reduce lead times in the production. In addition, a new distribution concept was introduced to improve delivery and availability.

=== Up to the present (1990s – 2010s) ===
In the mid-1990s Snap-on Incorporated, a global manufacturer and distributor of tools, entered the European market by acquiring the Spanish hand tool company Herramientas Eurotools S.A. In 1999, Snap-on acquired the business area Saws & Tools from Sandvik. The acquired business was named Bahco Group AB, a company with 2500 employees.

In 2005 Bahco AB and Herramientas Eurotools S.A. merged, founding SNA Europe with Bahco as the company's premium brand. Its headquarters was established in metropolitan Paris, France.

== Products ==
The total assortment of products Bahco offers includes more than 7000 items of professional hand tools like metal cutting saws, files and rotary burrs, wrenches and spanners, sockets and accessories, torque tools, impact tools and bits, screwdrivers, pliers, automotive special tools, electronics and fine mechanical pliers, extractors, refrigeration tools, tool storage, woodworking tools, pruning tools, and forestry hand tools.

== Innovations and patents ==
- 1888: JP invented and took patent for the pipe wrench
- 1891: JP's first patent registered on the adjustable wrench
- 1969: Introduced the Bi-metal hacksaw blade Sandflex
- 1982: Introduced the world's first ergonomic screwdriver
- 1996: Introduced and took the patent for Superior handsaws

== Bahco - the brand ==
=== The "fish & hook" logo ===
In 1862 Swedish Göran Fredrik Göransson founded Högbo Stål & Jernwerks AB, producing high-quality steel using the Bessemer process. In 1866 the company went into bankruptcy and was refounded as Sandviken Jernverks AB in 1868. With the new technology a number of new applications for steel wires was discovered; for instance, it was perfect for producing fishing hooks. A fishing hook must be hard and strong but absolutely not brittle. In 1879 The Swedish national board of trade approved the use of the Fish and Hook trademark. Starting in 1886, Göran began the production of saw blades that were of that same high-quality steel. The little fish surrounded by a hook that was registered as the official emblem of rolled steel for fishhooks was also used for the handsaws, to communicate these special properties and quality of the blades. Today all Bahco tools are branded with this logo.

=== ERGO ===
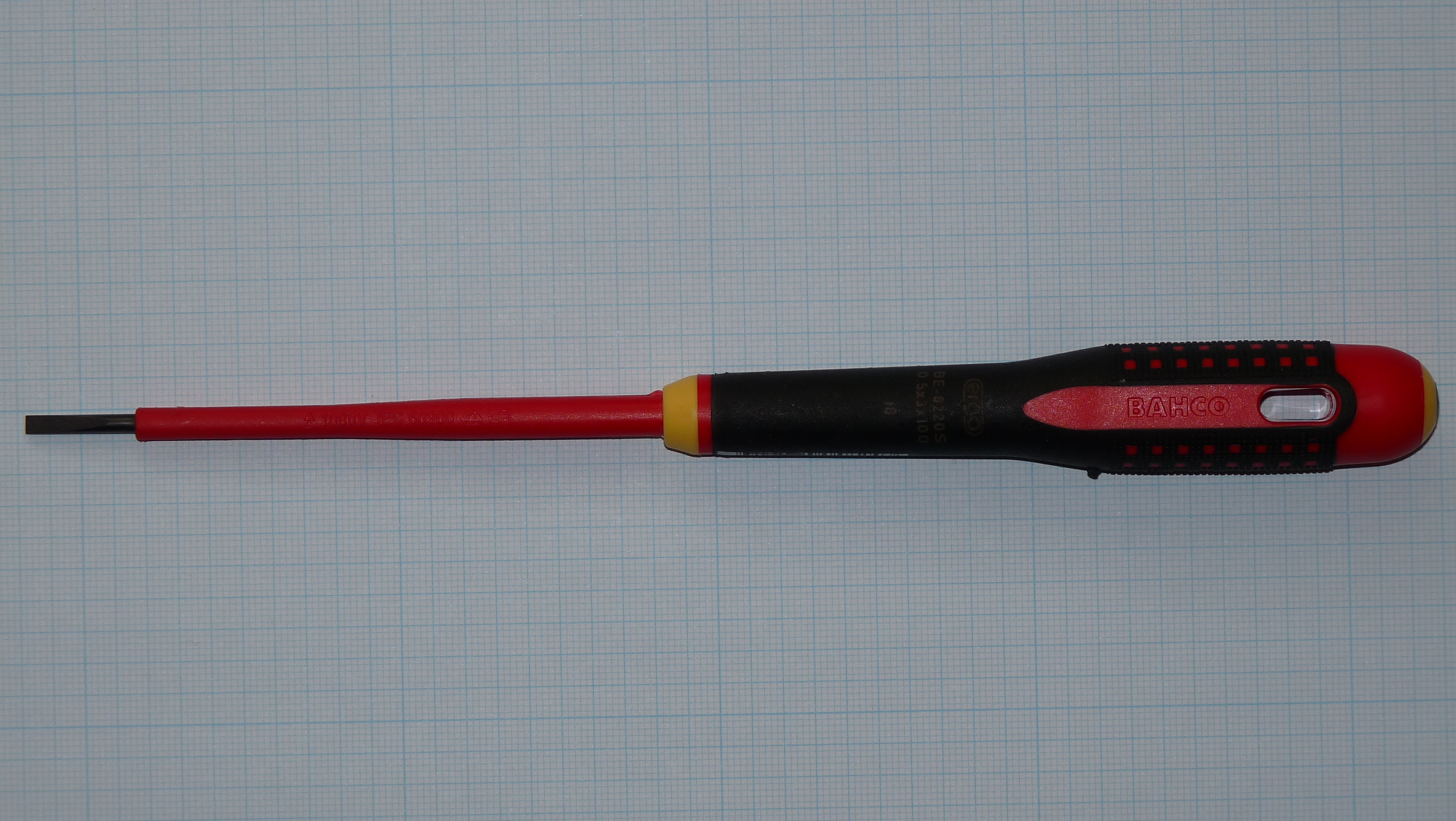
Bahco ERGO dielectric screwdriver

In 1983 Bahco started to develop and manufacture ergonomic hand tools. The first products that were developed according to ergonomic principles were the screwdrivers (1983), the adjustable wrenches (1984), wood chisels (1985) and slip-joint pliers (1986). In 1996, the Bahco Ergo concept was presented and scientifically approved as a way of preventing repetitive strain injuries and to increase productivity. All Bahco tools that carry the Ergo trademark have undergone a scientific 11-point development program with regard to ergonomics and function.

=== Awards ===
==== Complete list of awards ====
Year	Product	Award
1992	ERGO Combination Pliers	Excellent Swedish Design
1993	ERGO Adjustable Wrenches	Excellent Swedish Design
1995	ERGO File Handles	Excellent Swedish Design
1995	ERGO Ratchet 8155-1/2	Excellent Swedish Design
1996	ERGO Electronic Pliers RX	Excellent Swedish Design
1998	ERGO Electronic Pliers RX	Goed Industrieel Ontwerp
1998	ERGO Ratchet 8155-1/2	Goed Industrieel Ontwerp
1999	ERGO Hacksaw Frame 325	Red dot Design Award
1999	ERGO Screwdrivers	Excellent Swedish Design
1999	ERGO Screwdrivers	Red dot Design Award
1999	ERGO Pipe Wrenches	Goed Industrieel Ontwerp
1999	IZO Torque Wrenches	Goed Industrieel Ontwerp
1999	ERGO Superior Handsaw	Goed Industrieel Ontwerp
2000	ERGO Hacksaw Frame 325	Excellent Swedish Design
2000	ERGO Scrapers	Goed Industrieel Ontwerp
2000	ERGO Scrapers	Excellent Swedish Design
2000	ERGO Scrapers	Red dot Design Award
2001	ERGO Hacksaw Frame 325	Goed Industrieel Ontwerp
2001	ERGO Side Cutters	Goed Industrieel Ontwerp
2002	ERGO Hacksaw Frame 325	Japanese Good design Award
2002	ERGO Screwdrivers	Japanese Good design Award
2002	IZO-D Torque Wrenches	Red dot Design Award
2003	ERGO Hacksaw Frame 325	Industrial Design Excellence Awards
2003	ERGO Ratchet 7755-3/8	Red dot Design Award
2003	Heavy-Duty Pliers	Red dot Design Award
2003	Hacksaw frame 319	Red dot Design Award
2004	Hacksaw Frame 317	Red dot Design Award
2005	Bahco Tool Boxes	Japanese Good Design Award
2007	Bahco Pull Saws	Red dot Design Award
2009	Bahco Handsaw System	Red dot Design Award
2009	Bahco Handsaw System	iF Gold Award
2009	Bahco Measuring Tapes	Red dot Design Award
2010	Bahco Handsaw System	Swedish Design Award Design S
