= Karlsudd =

Settlement in Vaxholm Municipality, Sweden

- Location within Stockholm Location within Sweden
- Coordinates: 59°23′7″N 18°18′51″E
- Country: Sweden
- Province: Uppland
- County: Stockholm County
- Municipality: Vaxholm Municipality
- Time zone: UTC+1 (CET)
  - Summer (DST): UTC+2 (CEST)

Karlsudd is a settlement in Vaxholm Municipality, Stockholm County, Sweden. It is located at the south-eastern tip of the Bogesundslandet peninsula, but is not within the Bogesundslandet nature reserve that occupies most of that peninsular. It is also the only significant settlement within the Vaxholm Municipality that is on the Swedish mainland, rather than on islands of the Stockholm archipelago.

Karlsudd has a mixture of old and new buildings, and about 100 households live there. The land formerly belonged to the Brahe family, who owned the entire Bogesundslandet peninsular and Bogesund Castle. The castle lies some 2 kilometres (1.2 mi) west of Karlsudd.

Karlsudd is connected to the Swedish road network. Storstockholms Lokaltrafik operates bus route 681 that passes the entrance to Karlsudd on its way to and from Vaxholm town. Karlsudd pier is also served throughout the ice-free period of the year by passenger ships of the Waxholmsbolaget, providing a connection to Vaxholm town and Stockholm city.

== Gallery ==
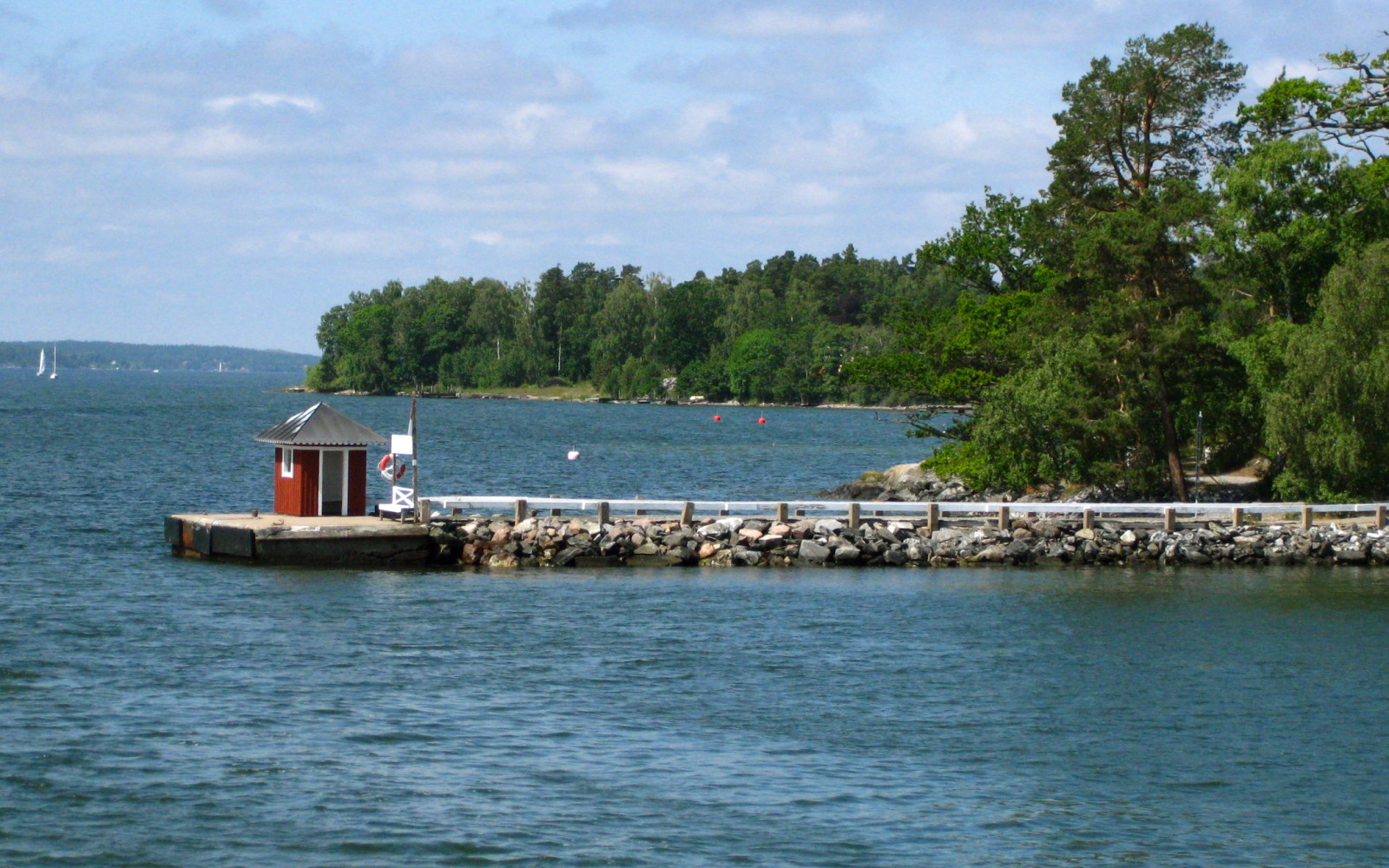
Karlsudd pier

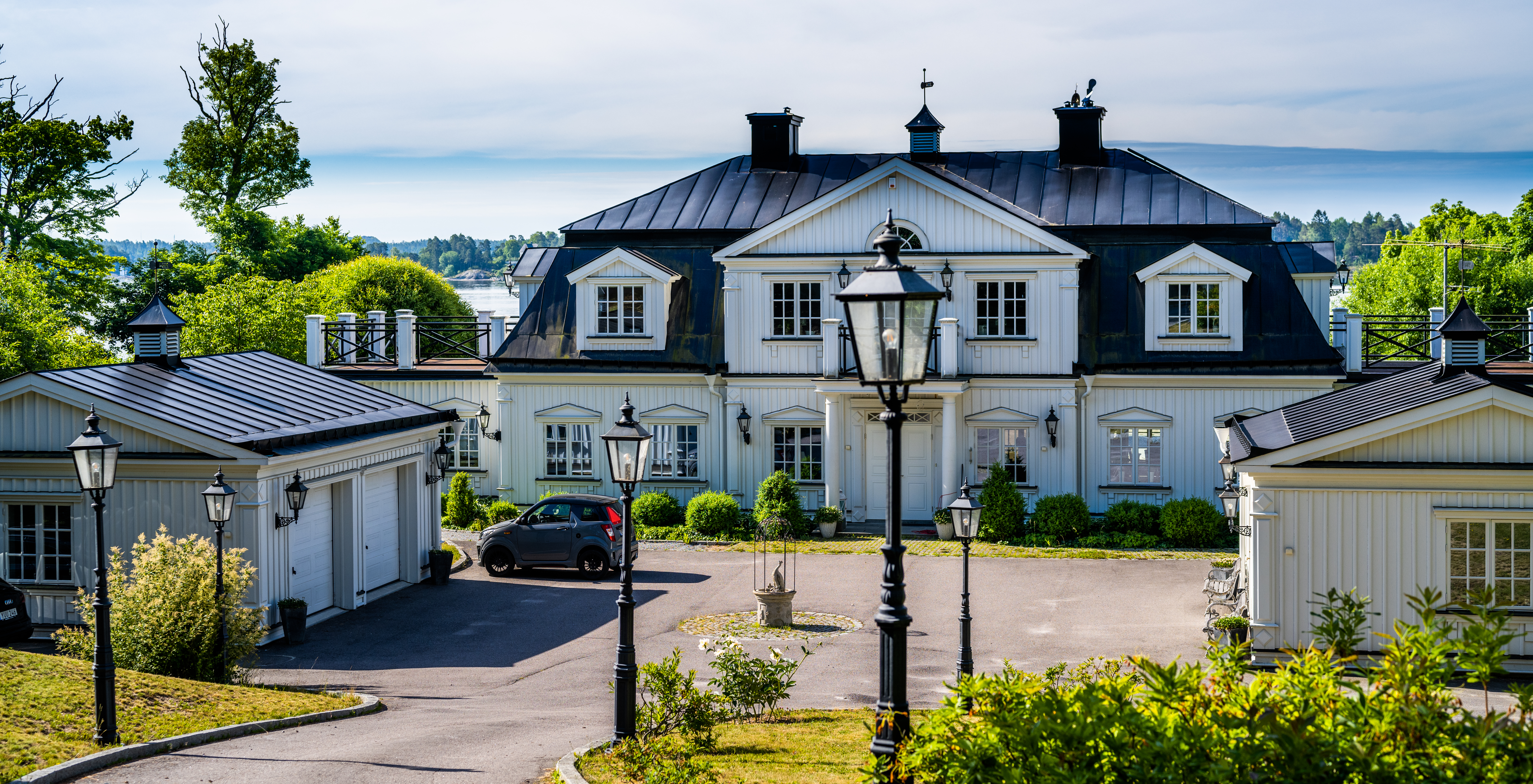
House at Karlsudd
