= 1640 in Sweden =

Events from the year 1640 in Sweden

== Incumbents ==
- Monarch – Christina

== Events ==
- Foundation of the University of Helsinki in the Swedish province of Finland.
- The first theater in Stockholm, Björngårdsteatern, is opened by Christian Thum.
- Swedish soldiers and civilians land in new Sweden to trade and improve the city.

== Births ==
- Politician Anders Bengtsson was born in 1640.

== Deaths ==
- 29 May - Elisabet Juliana Banér, noble (born 1600)
- November 27 - Gabriel Gustafsson Oxenstierna, politician (born 1587)
- - Åke Henriksson Tott, soldier and politician (born 1598)
