= Stavsnäs =

- Location within Stockholm Location within Sweden Location within European Union
- Coordinates: 59°17′N 18°41′E
- Country: Sweden
- Province: Uppland
- County: Stockholm County
- Municipality: Värmdö Municipality

Area
  - Total: 0.57 km^{2} (0.22 sq mi)

Population (31 December 2020)
  - Total: 1,871
  - Density: 3,300/km^{2} (8,500/sq mi)
- Time zone: UTC+1 (CET)
  - Summer (DST): UTC+2 (CEST)

Stavsnäs is a locality situated on the north east part of the island Fågelbrolandet in Värmdö Municipality, Stockholm County, Sweden with 810 inhabitants in 2010. As there are numerous holiday homes in the area, the population is significantly larger during summer. Stavsnäs is located 44 kilometers from central Stockholm and accessible by road.

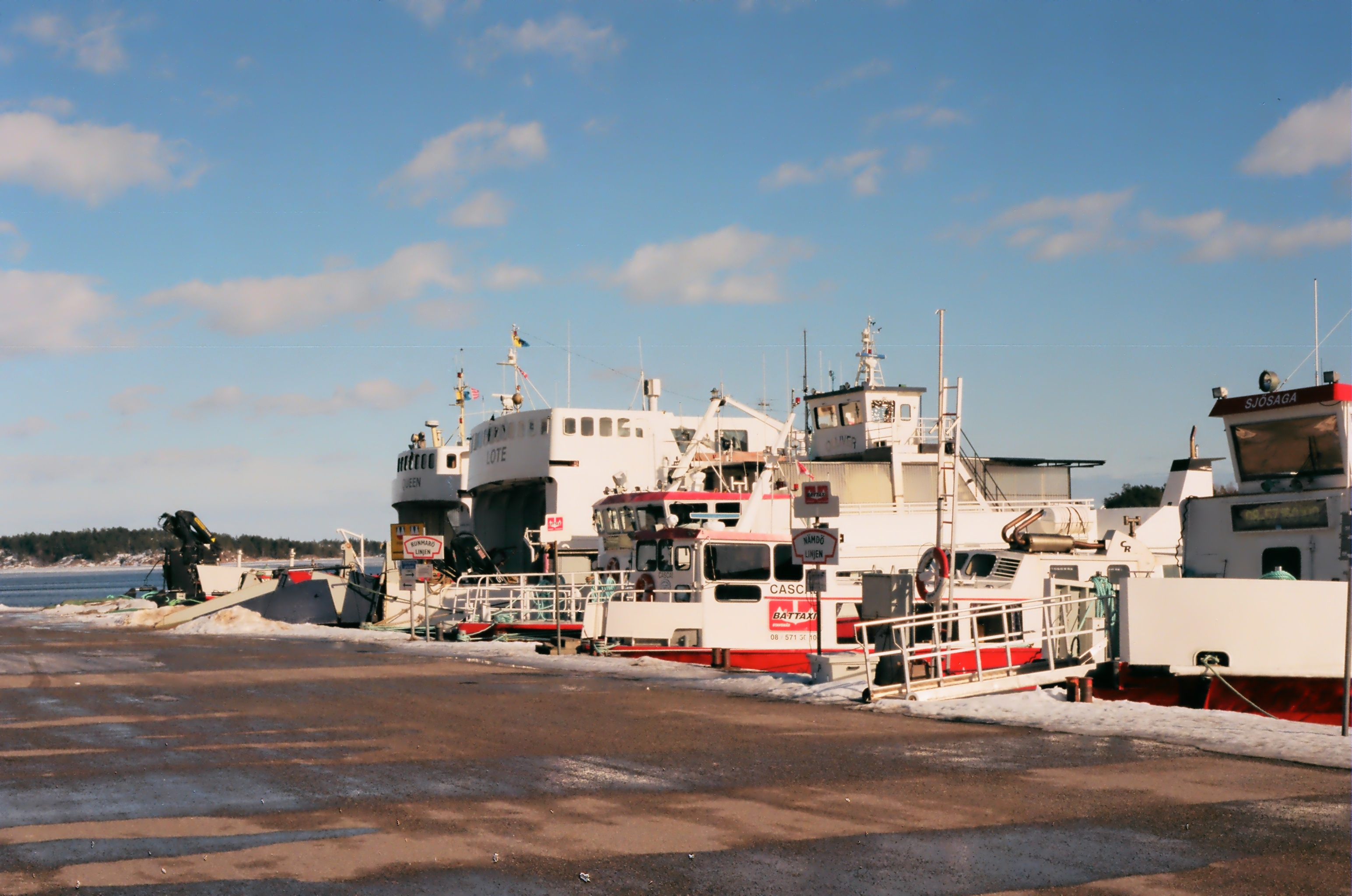
Vinterhamn of Stavsnäs.

Stavsnäs consists of three different parts; Stavsnäs By (the original picturesque wood-house village built up around the old harbour, dating back to medieval times), Stavsnäs Gärde (a modern housing area with detached houses and blocks of flats), and Stavsnäs Vinterhamn or Vinterhamn (the all-year ferry harbour connecting the nearby inhabited islands (such as Sandhamn) with the Stockholm bus transportation network).

In Stavsnäs By there is the old harbour, Sommarhamn, a museum dedicated to the history of the archipelago and its inhabitants, Skärgårdsmuseet, and a bakery and café which turns into a restaurant and bar in the evenings.

South of Vinterhamn on the island of Hölö (accessible by bridge from Fågelbrolandet), Sjösala, the summer house of Evert Taube and the Taube family, is located.
