= Sjösala vals =

Song
- Language: Swedish
- Published: 1942
- Songwriter: Evert Taube

Sjösala vals ("Waltz of Sjösala") is a Swedish waltz written in 1941 at Rejmyre by Evert Taube. It was recorded by Sven-Olof Sandberg in 1941 as B-side to his single Flicka från Backafall. It was published in Sjösalaboken in 1942 during the World War II, Taube wanted to "besjunga skönheten och glädjen som kriget hotar att förgöra" ("sing about the beauty and happiness which the war threatens to destroy"). It is a famous sing-along song in Sweden.

Sjösala is the name of the summer house of the family Taube, located in Stavsnäs in the Stockholm archipelago. The description of the family's life at the archipelago has been as a picture of the Swedish summer holiday. The lyrics, which starts with "Rönnerdahl han skuttar med ett skratt ur sin säng...", is about Rönnerdahl's summer happiness. In 1969 Sjösala was burnt by Mona Wallén-Hjerpe.

Evert Taube sang the song first in the film Gatans serenad, but Sven-Olof Sandberg, Harry Brandelius, De tre hallåmännen and Gustaf Torreblad recorded it before Taube. Even Chilean singer Rosita Serrano, who couldn't speak Swedish, recorded a version of the song in 1943.

== References and sources ==
- "Den svenska sångboken" (1997 song book)
- "Barnens svenska sångbok" (1999 song book)LIBRIS - Barnens svenska sångbok
- "Evert Taube – Sångboken" (2009 song book)
