= Mona Wallén-Hjerpe =

Mona Wallén-Hjerpe sometimes called Sjösalakvinnan (The Sjösala Woman) was born 24 January 1932 in Stockholm and died 19 June 2008 (aged 76). Wallén-Hjerpe was a Swedish author and criminal who burnt Evert Taube's summer house Sjösala on 19 December 1969. After that she was placed in a psychiatric hospital. She confessed to the burning of Sjösala on 10 March 1970 and on 1 August she was sentenced for the treatment of mental disorders for having schizophrenia.

Wallén-Hjerpe wrote about her "relationship" to the Taube family in her 1987 book Sjösala brinner (Sjösala Is Burning), saying "Evert Taube lovar att gifta sig med mig, men jag blir inspärrad på mentalsjukhus" ("Evert Taube promises to marry me, but I get locked-in at a psychiatric hospital").

She is portrayed as Lena Nylén in Fredrik Strage's 2005 book Fans, and later there was a play based on the book, performed at Södra Teatern in Stockholm.

Mona is also the inspiration for Swedish singer Thomazes song "You're In Love With Me" (2012).
