= Daniël Boone =

Flemish painter and art dealer

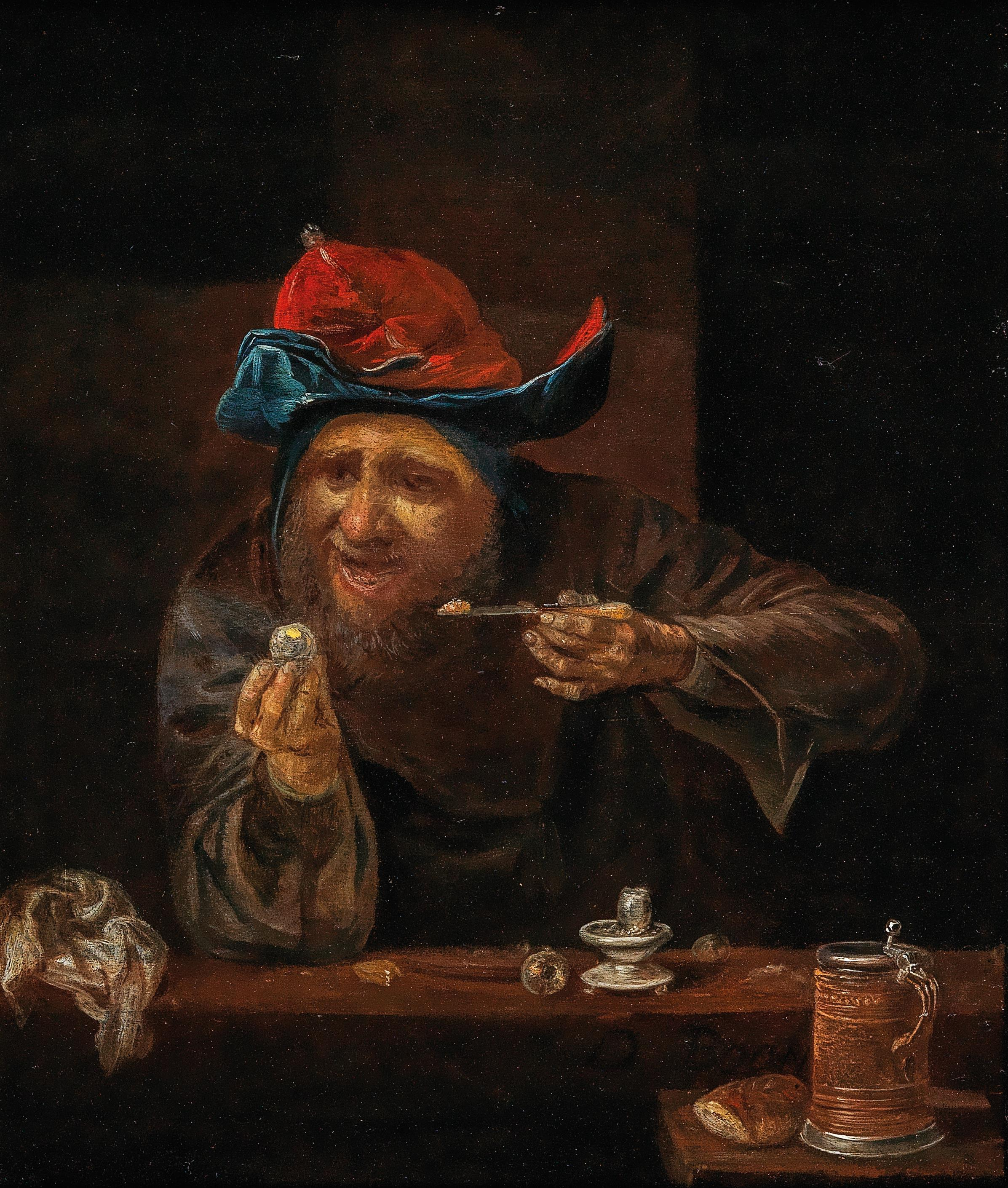
Interior with a peasant sitting at a table

Daniël Boone (also Boon or Boontje), signed once as Daniel Adriaensen (1631/32 – 1686), was a Flemish painter known for his genre scenes of boorish types in the style of Adriaen Brouwer and Egbert van Heemskerk. He was also active as an art dealer. He spent the latter part of his career in the Dutch Republic and England.

== Life ==
Very little is known about the life of Boone. According to the artist biographer Jacob Campo Weyerman, Daniël Boone was born in 1632 in Borgerhout, a village near Antwerp. As on 17 September 1665 he declared to be 34 years old and on 21 September 1654 he declared to be 23 years old he was likely born in 1631 or 1632. He was the brother of Huybrecht Boone (died 1660 in Middelburg) and Salomon Boone, who lived in Middelburg. Daniël later became the guardian of Huybrecht's children.

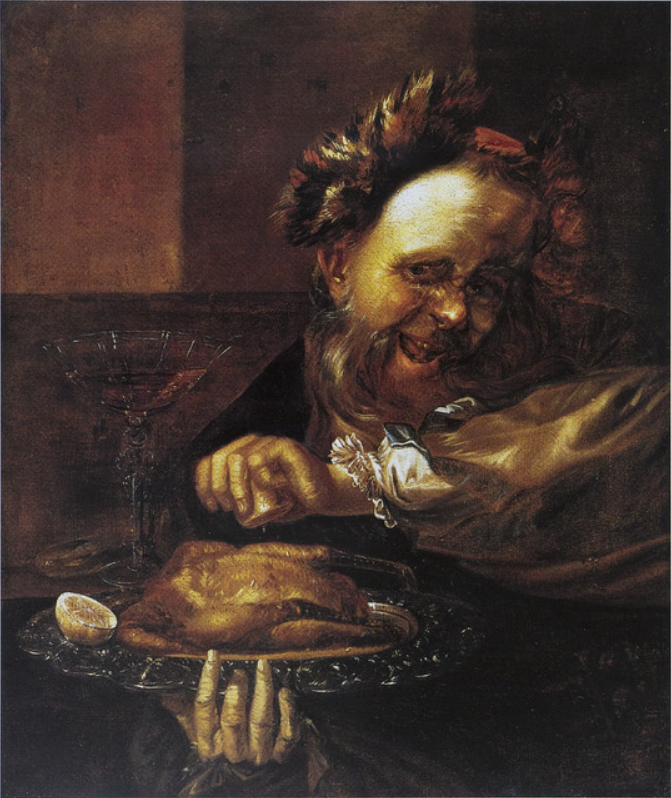
A bearded man squeezing a lemon over a roasted bird on a plate

Campo Weyerman stated that Joos van Craesbeeck was Boone's master. Van Craesbeeck was a painter from Antwerp who was a pupil of Adriaen Brouwer and was known for his genre scenes depicting low-life figures as well as scenes of middle-class people. Van Craesbeeck worked in Brussels in the latter part of his career. There is no record of Boone's apprenticeship in the books of the Guilds of Saint Luke of Antwerp or Brussels.

Boone's presence in Amsterdam and his social circle are documented in 1654. In that year Reynier Hals, the son of the famous painter Frans Hals, made a disposition for him and Pieter van Roestraeten. Van Roestraeten was a painter of still lifes, originally from Haarlem but then living in Amsterdam. He was also the brother-in-law of Reynier Hals. There is no further reference to Boone in the records relating to Reynier Hals. Further there does not seem to have been any mutual stylistic influencing between the two artists. This would indicate the two artists were not close. The relationship with van Roestraten may have been stronger as van Roestraten may have been the sitter for Boone's picture of A bearded man squeezing a lemon over a roasted bird on a plate. Van Roestraten moved to work in London around the same time as Boone and like Boone, would live there for the rest of his life.

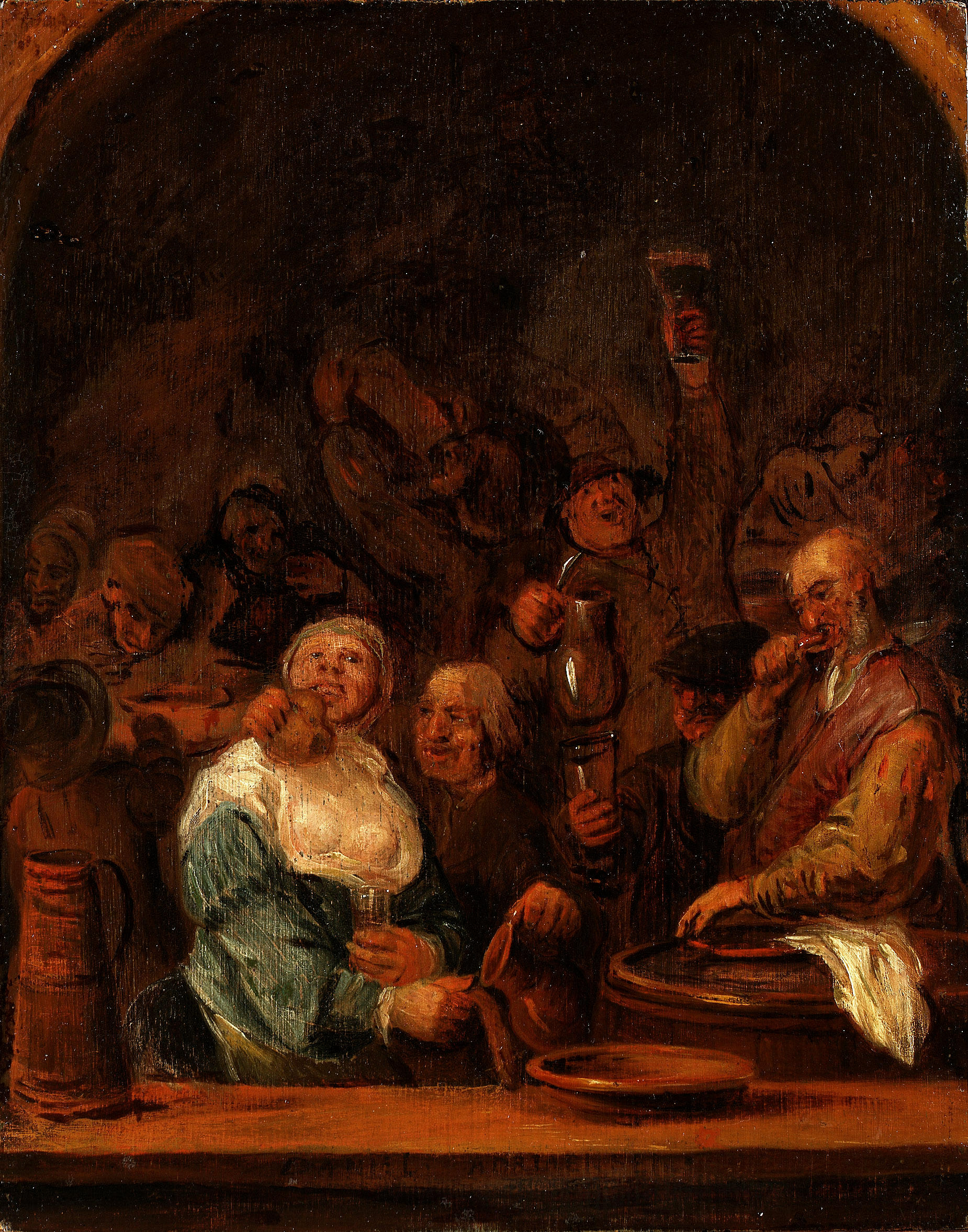
Peasants carousing in a tavern

In Amsterdam Boone may also have known Egbert van Heemskerk who was a witness for Reynier Hals there in 1661 and stayed for periods in Amsterdam in the 1660s before leaving for England. In 1660 and 1661 Boone was recorded in documents in Middelburg likely related to dealing with the estate of his brother Huybrecht and the guardianship of Huybrecht's children. In 1665 he is recorded living on the Nieuwendijk in Amsterdam. Shortly after 1665 Boone left for England. He must have been very prolific as 99 of his genre paintings were offered at London auctions between 1689 and 1692.

The Dutch engraver Jan Griffier who resided in London from 1666 is traditionally believed to have made a mezzotint portrait of Boone as a fiddle player. However, as this mezzotint was purportedly made after a painting by Hendrick ter Brugghen who died before Boone was born, it seems unlikely the mezzotint depicts Boone. As the posthumous sale of his collection was advertised in the London Gazette of 22 September 1692, Boone must have died before this date.

== Work ==
Although Boone seems to have been a prolific painter, only a few works by his hand are currently known. There are no extant dated works by Boone. His known works are genre scenes and genre portraits. These works are in the peasant genre of rough looking peasants engaging in merry making in taverns. In these works the influence of Egbert van Heemskerk, a pupil of Pieter de Grebber was obvious. Other influences include Adriaen van Ostade. David Teniers the Younger and Adriaen Brouwer.
