= Elsa Borg =

Swedish educator and social worker (1826–1909)

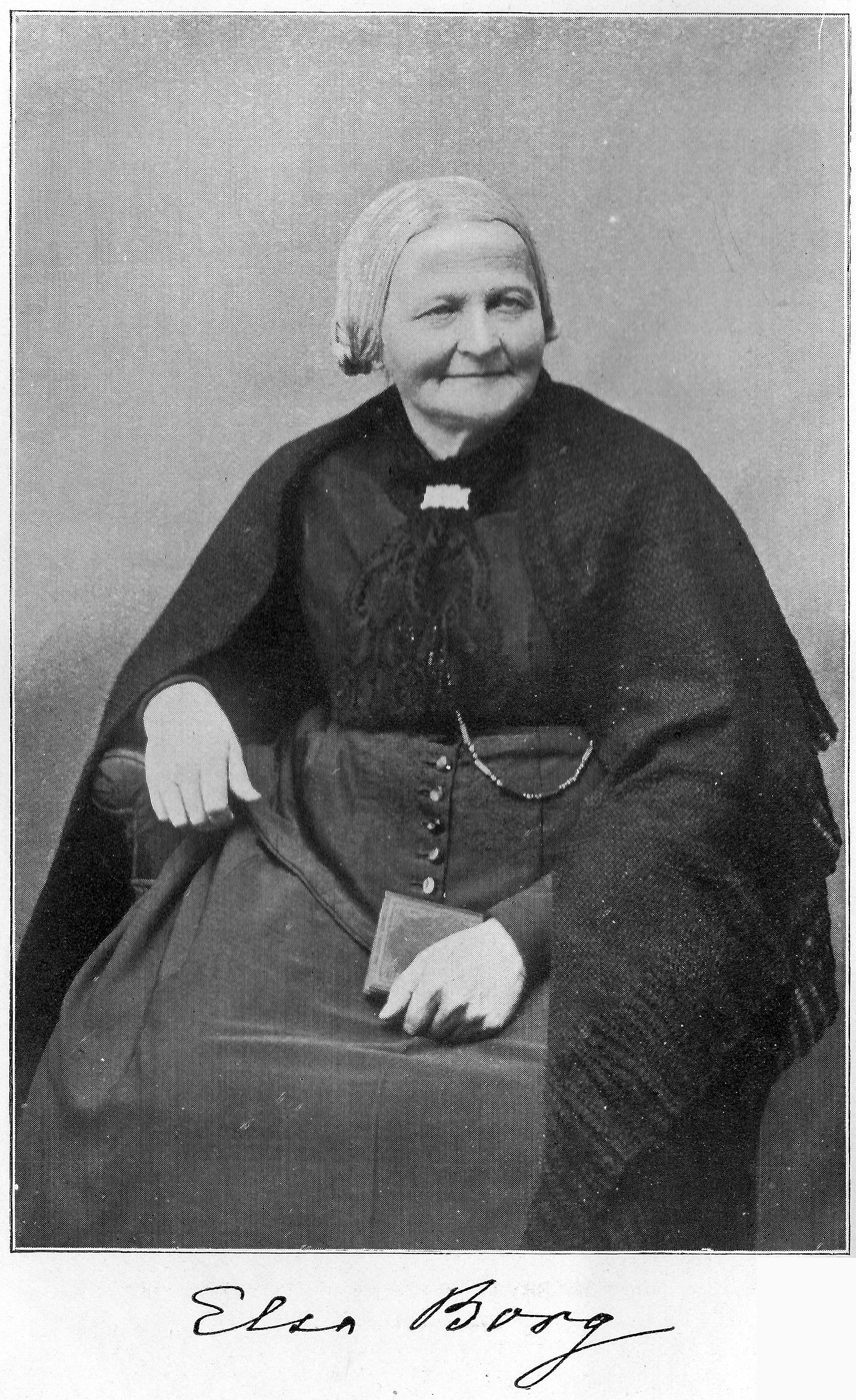
Elsa Borg

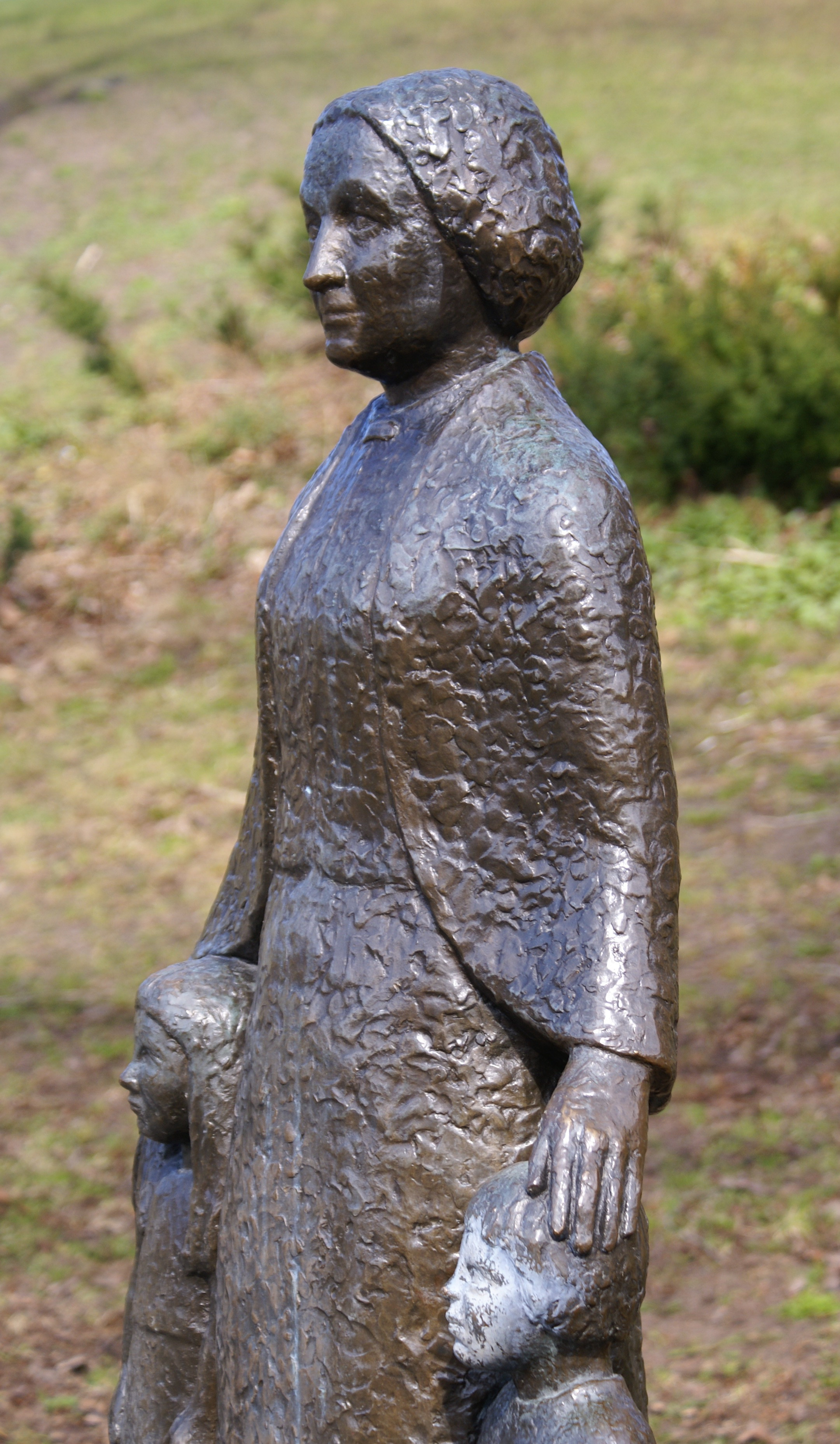
Elsa Borg (bronze, 1972) statue by Astri Taube, in Södermalm, Vitabergsparken, Stockholm

Elsa Borg (19 July 1826 – 24 February 1909) was a Swedish educator and social worker. She is known for being the founder of the Christian Bible Home for women and its combined mission work and social work among the poor in Stockholm.

== Early years and education ==
Elisabeth "Elsa" Dionysia Borg was born in Rytterne, Västmanland, 19 July 1826. She was the daughter of the vicar Denis Borg (d. 1837) and Hedvig Elisabet Borg (d. 1830). Her mother was the cousin of Pär Aron Borg.

Borg was educated in a girls' school in first Sala and then Stockholm, and finally at the school of Cecilia Fryxell.

== Educator ==
After having completed her education, she worked as a governess.

Between 1859 and 1874, Elsa Borg functioned as the principal of the Christian Girls' School in Gävle, regarded as the local pioneer secondary education institution for females in that city.

She ended her educational career in 1874 because she had become overworked, and retired to the home of her former colleague, the former teacher Alfhild Flodin, who married the businessman H. A. Lidholm and settled on the estate Nådhammar in Sörmland.

== Social worker and missionary ==
Elsa Borg was one of the foremost representatives of the Great Awakening in Sweden. On Nådhammar, she became acquainted with a group of Christian philanthropists who considered her to be a suitable person to open a Christian Bible Home for women in the slum of the capital. The project was to employ Bible women to act as missionaries in the slum, pass out bibles and preach in combination with social work. The idea was inspired by the London Bible and Domestic Female Mission, started in London by Ellen Ranyard in 1857. Elsa Borg accepted the offer to organize the project in Sweden, after making a study visit to the English role model in London.

In 1875, Elsa Borg moved to Stockholm, where she founded a Bible Home for women with the support of Queen Sophia. After a visit to Great Britain in 1876 and 1878, she came to know William Boardman and Granville Waldegrave, 3rd Baron Radstock, and having returned to Sweden, she devoted herself to mission work combined with Christian social work.

The institution was situated in the Stockholm ill-reputed slum of Vita Bergen ('White Mountains'). The home was meant to educate female Christian social workers. In 1877, it expanded to include an asylum for former female prostitutes, in 1881 an orphanage and in 1883 a hospital, and in 1885 a home for the education of missionaries: this was followed by branches in other parts of the country.

From 1885, she also published a missionary paper, Trons hvila.

She died 24 February 1909, in Vita Bergen ('White Mountains'), Stockholm.

== Hymns ==
- Din Gud är när (1920)
- Sjung, Guds folk, på pilgrimsvägen
- Sjungen, syskon, under vägen (1920)
