= Dorotea van Fornenbergh =

Dutch actress

Dorotea van Fornenbergh (born between 1647 and 1654 – died after 1697), was a Dutch stage actor.

== Life ==
Born to theatre director Jan Baptist van Fornenbergh (1624–1697) and actor Helena Heusen (ca. 1622–1680), married in 1696 to Johan Hauman Gal.

Fornenbergh grew up next to the theater that her father opened in 1660 in The Hague. She and her sisters Susanna, Johanna and Cornelia Dorotea and her likely halfsister Anna van Fornenbergh all were part of her father's theatre company, which between 1665 and 1667 and again in 1672 went on an international tour to Northern Germany, Scandinavia and Baltic. They performed in Altona, Tallinn, Stockholm, Copenhagen and Riga. On 22 February 1667, she is likely to have participated in the inauguration performance of the theatre Lejonkulan in Stockholm.

While she is known to still have performed in The Hague in 1679, Dorotea followed the example of her sister Cornelia in July 1681 and received the communion as a member of the reformed church after having renounced and repented her profession as shameful. Her father and her sister Johanna followed their example.
