= Inga-Britt Fredholm =

Swedish secretary, archivist and author

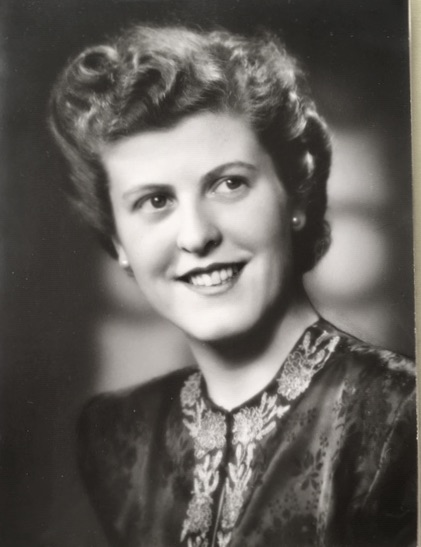
- Inga-Britt Fredlund circa 1949.
- Born: Inga-Britt Margareta Pütter; 25 April 1923; Gothenburg, Sweden
- Died: 28 March 2014 (aged 90); Gothenburg, Sweden
- Resting place: Örgryte New Cemetery
- Occupations: Secretary, archivist, writer
- Writing career
- Period: 1964–1993
- Notable works: Samlade berättelser med tillhörande visor och ballader (1966–1967), När jag var en ung caballero: en bildbiografi (1970), Kom i min famn: Evert Taube 1920–1971 : en bildbiografi (1972), Tänk, inspirera herr Andersson”: glimtar från mina arbetsår med Evert Taube (1990)

Inga-Britt Margareta Fredholm (née Pütter; 25 April 1923 – 28 March 2014) was a Swedish secretary, archivist and author. She spent more than ten years serving as Evert Taube’s literary secretary, both in Sweden and abroad. She collected and edited Taube's stories for Bonniers' and contributed a total of twenty pieces of work on the national poet.

== Early life ==
Fredholm was born in Kungsladugård, Gothenburg in 1923. Her parents were Adolph Pütter, a merchant, and his wife Margarete Pütter, née Wippermann. Fredholm had ties with Örgryte, where her paternal grandfather had built the sizable Villa Daltorp, after which Daltorpsgatan in Bö is named. Her paternal grandfather, Gustav Adolph Friedrich E. Pütter, was a wholesale merchant in Gothenburg. There was German ancestry on both her maternal and paternal sides and when Fredholm was still an infant she and her twin brother, Hanz, and the whole family moved to Berlin. Her basic schooling occurred at German girls’ schools.

In 1934, the family returned to Gothenburg and Fredholm continued her education at Mathilda Hall's school. She thus became completely bilingual. She trained as a secretary and was a skilled stenographer who had knowledge of the English and French languages.

== Career ==
Fredholm gained a two-year post working for the United Nations in Geneva. There her duties included working with Gunnar Myrdal during his period as Secretary-general of the Economic Commission of Europe (ECE), from 1947 to 1957.

Fredholm returned to Gothenburg again, where she gained a job as secretary at the Park Avenue Hotel. There, in 1962, she met Evert Taube and this led to her becoming his literary secretary for more than ten years. During the 1964–1965 period, she undertook travel for work, along with Taube, going to the Antibes in France and to the Pampas in Argentina.

Later in her life, she wrote two books about this period of her life, entitled "Tänk, inspirera herr Andersson": glimtar från mina arbetsår med Evert Taube", published in 1990, and "Ett sällsamt farväl: essay till Evert Taubes 103-årsdag", published in 1993.

During the 1960s, she collected the poet's stories and published them in eight volumes under the shared title of "Samlade berättelser med tillhörande visor och ballader", released 1966–1967. She also collaborated on "Vid tiden för Astri och Apollon: okända dikter och berättelser", published in 1964 and during the 1970s she produced two pictorial biographies of the poet: ”När jag var en ung caballero: en bildbiografi” (1970) and ”Kom i min famn: Evert Taube 1920–1971 : en bildbiografi” (1972). These, however, are but a selection of works about Evert Taube that she contributed to in one way or another.

Fredholm made several donations to the library in the University of Gothenburg – the Inga-Britt Fredholm papers in the Evert Taube's archive: in 1998, 1999, 2001 and in 2019.

Fredholm was an active member of "Kulturminnesföreningen (cultural heritage association) Otterhällan" in Gothenburg and the cultural secretary from the 1990s in this association. She was also appointed as honorary member. For many years she organised events about Taube in conjunction with his birthday on 12 March. She also provided the documentation and inspiration for the opening of the experience called "Evert Taubes värld" (the world of Evert Taube) at Liseberg amusement park in 2008.

== Personal life ==
From 1954 to 1959, Fredholm was married to Gösta Ferdinand Fredholm, an engineer who had been born in Uppåkra, then in Malmöhus County, Sweden.

== Death and a poem ==
When she died in 2014, the funeral was held at Örgryte Old Church and she is buried in the family grave at Örgryte New Cemetery. The announcement of her death was published in the Svenska Dagbladet, Dagens Nyheter and Göteborgs-Posten newspapers in April 2014.

The following is a poem by Evert Taube from this announcement:

In Swedish:

- Med vilken ömhet man kan famna minnen
- som, om de kläds i ord, står sorgset blyga
- och liksom vädjar milt till våra sinnen
- att åter in i tystnaden få smyga

– ur "Minnet och tystnaden" (1971)

In English:

- With what tenderness to embrace memories
- which, if dressed in words, stand sadly shy
- and as gently appeal to our minds
- to again into silence slip

- from "The Memory and the Silence" (1971)
