= 1587 in Sweden =

Events from the year 1587 in Sweden

== Incumbents ==
- Monarch – John III

== Events ==
- - The Vadstena artiklar grants the King the right to appoint bishops and officials in the Duchies of the princes.
- - A clerical meeting in Strängnäs confirm the Örebro artiklar and protest to the pro-Catholic liturgy of the King.
- - The Swedish-born Crown Prince Sigismund III Vasa is elected King of Poland,
- - The Royal Council forces the King and Crown Prince to agree to Kalmar stadgar, which protects the independence of Sweden during the potential personal union between Sweden and Poland.

== Births ==
- 15 June - Gabriel Gustafsson Oxenstierna, Lord High Steward of Sweden (died 1640)
- 17 November - Louis De Geer (1587–1652), industrialist (died 1682)
- 12 June - Gustav of Sweden, child of Charles IX (died in infancy)
