= Christian von Thum =

Swedish innkeeper, painter and art agent

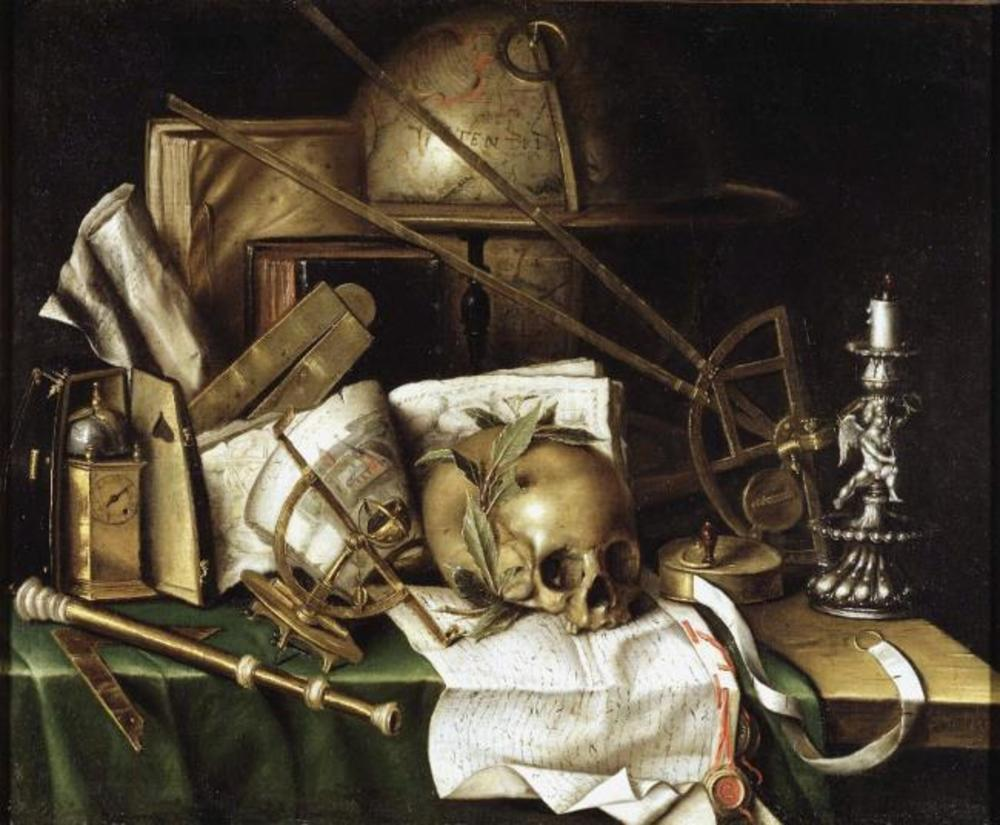
Vanitas Still Life with Astronomical Instruments

Christian von Thum or Christian von Thum (I) (c. 1625 in Kalmar – 12 August 1686 in Stockholm) was a Swedish innkeeper, still life painter, decorative painter, set painter, copyist and art agent. His known works include vanitas still lifes and still lifes with foodstuffs, paintings of hermits and religious paintings.

== Life ==
He was born in Kalmar around 1625 as the son of the innkeeper and well-known actor Christian Thum who was originally from Germany. In 1655 he married Anna Catharina Keijser, daughter of the prominent book printer Hindrich Keijser. Their sons Christian and Henrik (Hindrich) also became artists.

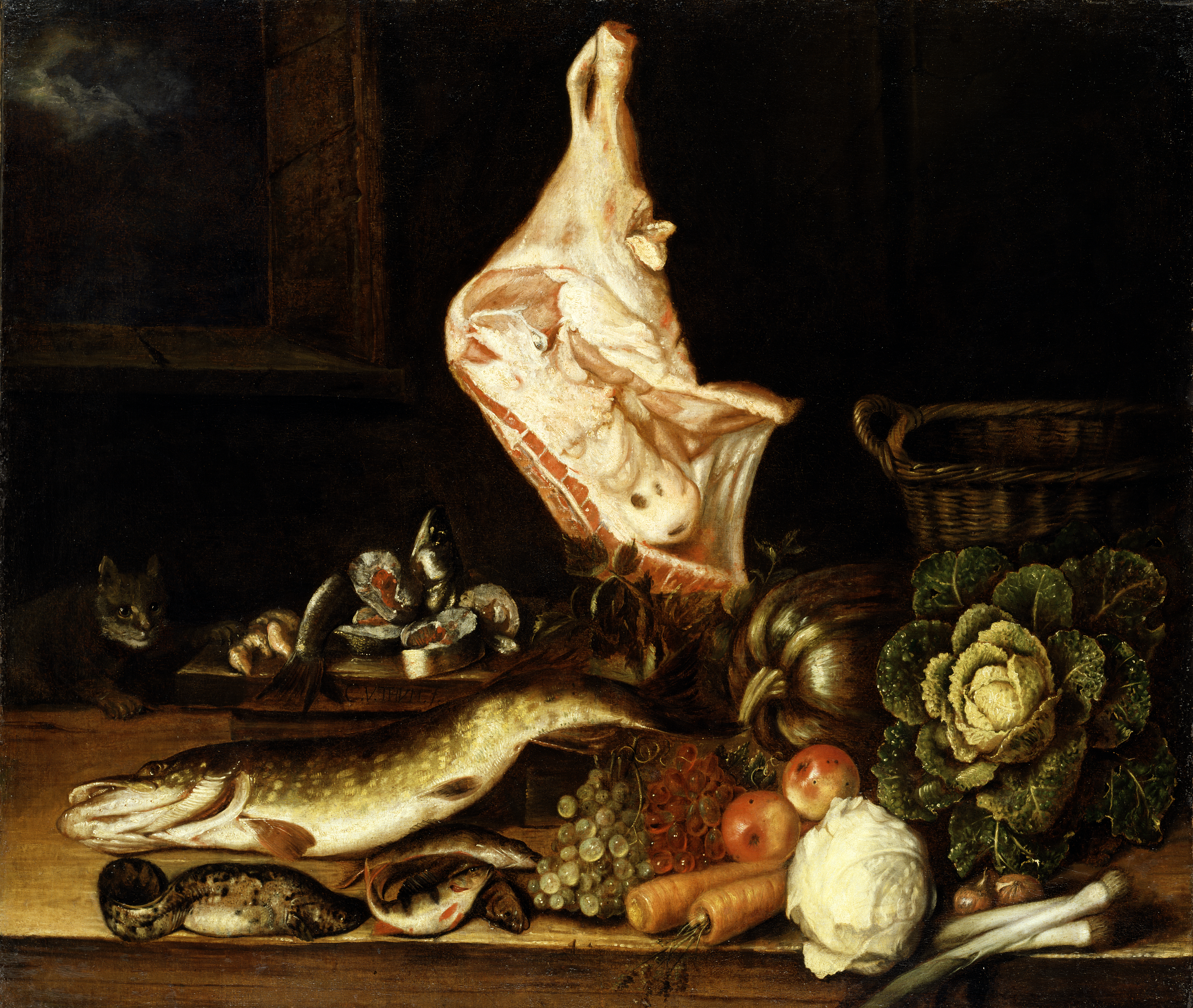
Still life with a joint of veal, greens and fish

He was probably taught how to paint by Jacob Heinrich Elbfas or Johan Assman in Stockholm. He is mentioned as a master painter at the Stockholm painters' guild in 1655. In the 1650s he was commissioned by Countess Maria Sophia De la Gardie, the sister of Count Magnus Gabriel De la Gardie, a Swedish statesman and military man, to work on a number of painting and gilding commissions. He worked in 1663 on a commission for Countess Sigrid Bielke, the wife of Gustav Horn, Count of Pori. In 1664, he was hired by the Dowager Queen Hedvig Eleonora to create a scene decorated with flowers made of paper, wax, gold leaf and larch for a production of the ballet The Four Seasons at the castle. in 1667 he restored about 30 portrait paintings kept at Uppsala Castle.

He travelled around 1668 to the Spanish Netherlands where he bought works of art for Magnus Gabriel De la Gardie and the Dowager Queen Hedvig Eleonora, amongst others. He took over his father's inn in Stockholm and was mentioned among the innkeepers in Stockholm in 1671.

He worked on an altarpiece for the church of Arboga in 1672. In 1675 he worked, together with Johan Göransson and Jochim Langh, on the regilding of the coronation chair for Charles XI's coronation in Uppsala. In 1683-1684 he collaborated with Johan Hafwersatt on the decorative elements at the Maria Magdalena Church in Stockholm which was at the time being rebuilt.

== Work ==
His known works include vanitas still lifes and still lifes with foodstuffs, paintings of hermits and religious paintings.

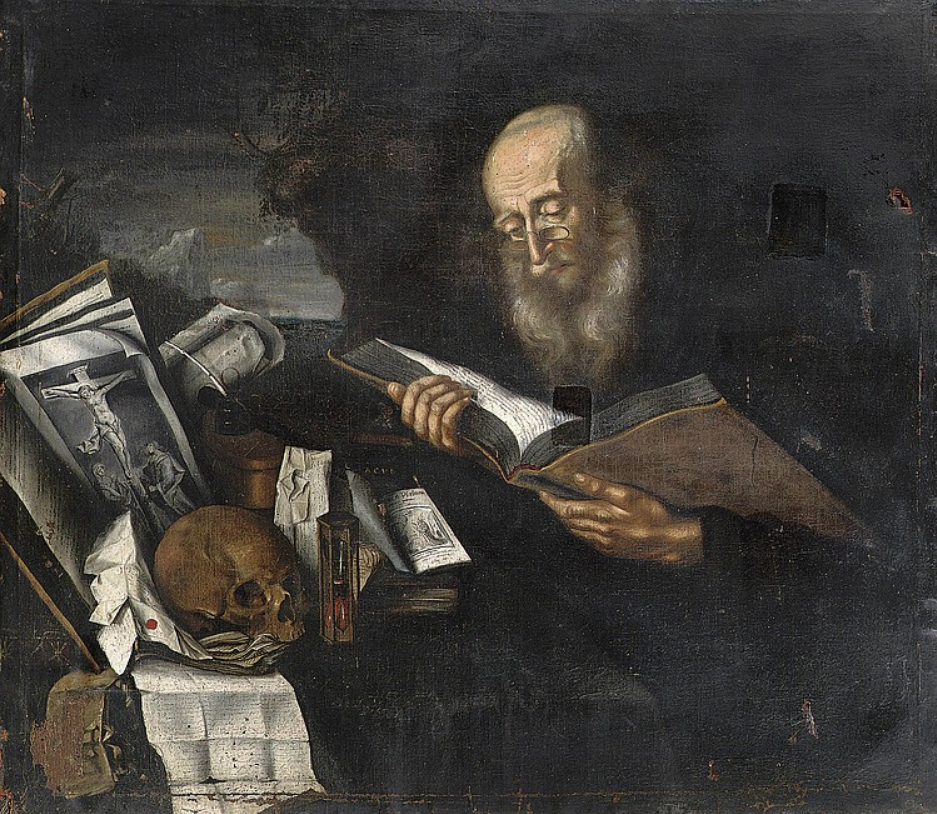
A hermit

His Vanitas Still Life with Astronomical Instruments in the Nationalmuseum depicts all kinds of objects such as a crowned skull, an extinguished candle along with a telescope, astronomical measuring instruments, and a celestial globe on a table. These objects are the typical symbols found in so-called vanitas still lifes. This genre of still life aims to evoke the meaninglessness of earthly life and the transient nature of all earthly goods and pursuits through the use of stock symbols, which reference the transience of things, the brevity of life and, in particular, the futility of earthly wealth and glory. skulls, soap bubbles, candles, smoking utensils, empty glasses, wilting flowers, insects, smoke, watches, hourglasses mirrors, books and musical instruments, and various expensive or exclusive objects such as jewellery, silverware and rare shells. The term vanitas is derived from the famous line 'Vanitas, Vanitas. Et omnia Vanitas', in the book of the Ecclesiastes in the bible, which in the King James Version is translated as "Vanity of vanities, all is vanity". The worldview behind the vanitas paintings was a Christian understanding of the world as a temporary place of fleeting pleasures and sorrows from which mankind can only escape through the sacrifice and resurrection of Christ. In his Vanitas Still Life with Astronomical Instruments the astronomical measuring instruments and celestial globe can be interpreted as a reminder of the fragility of life despite new discoveries and knowledge. Another interpretation could be that science endures while life perishes.

An old man reading in one of his works shows similarities to the work of the unidentified painter given the notname Pseudo-Roestraten.
