= Astri Taube =

Swedish sculptor and artist

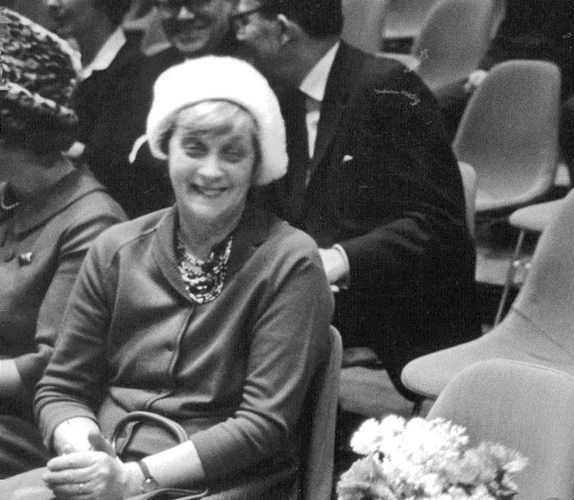
- Born: Astrid Linnéa Matilda Bergman; 9 December 1898; Stockholm, Sweden
- Died: 23 December 1980 (aged 82)
- Education: Carl Milles, Herman Bergman
- Known for: sculpture, drawing, lithography

Astrid "Astri" Linnéa Matilda Taube, née Bergman (9 December 1898 – 23 December 1980) was a Swedish sculptor and artist known for her child portraits and sculptures in public venues. She was married to Swedish singer and songwriter Evert Taube.

== Biography ==
Taube was born in Stockholm, Sweden to Per Herman Bergman and Mélen Tholff. She learned sculpture from her father and from noted Swedish sculptor Carl Milles.

In 1925, she married Evert Taube. Evert met her when she was nine years old. Taube had four children with Evert Taube: Per Evert Arvid Joakim Taube (1926–2009), Rose Marie Astrid Elisabet Taube (1928–1928), Ellinor Gunnel Astri Elisabeth Taube (1930–1998), and Sven-Bertil Gunnar Evert Taube (1934 – 2022).

== Works ==
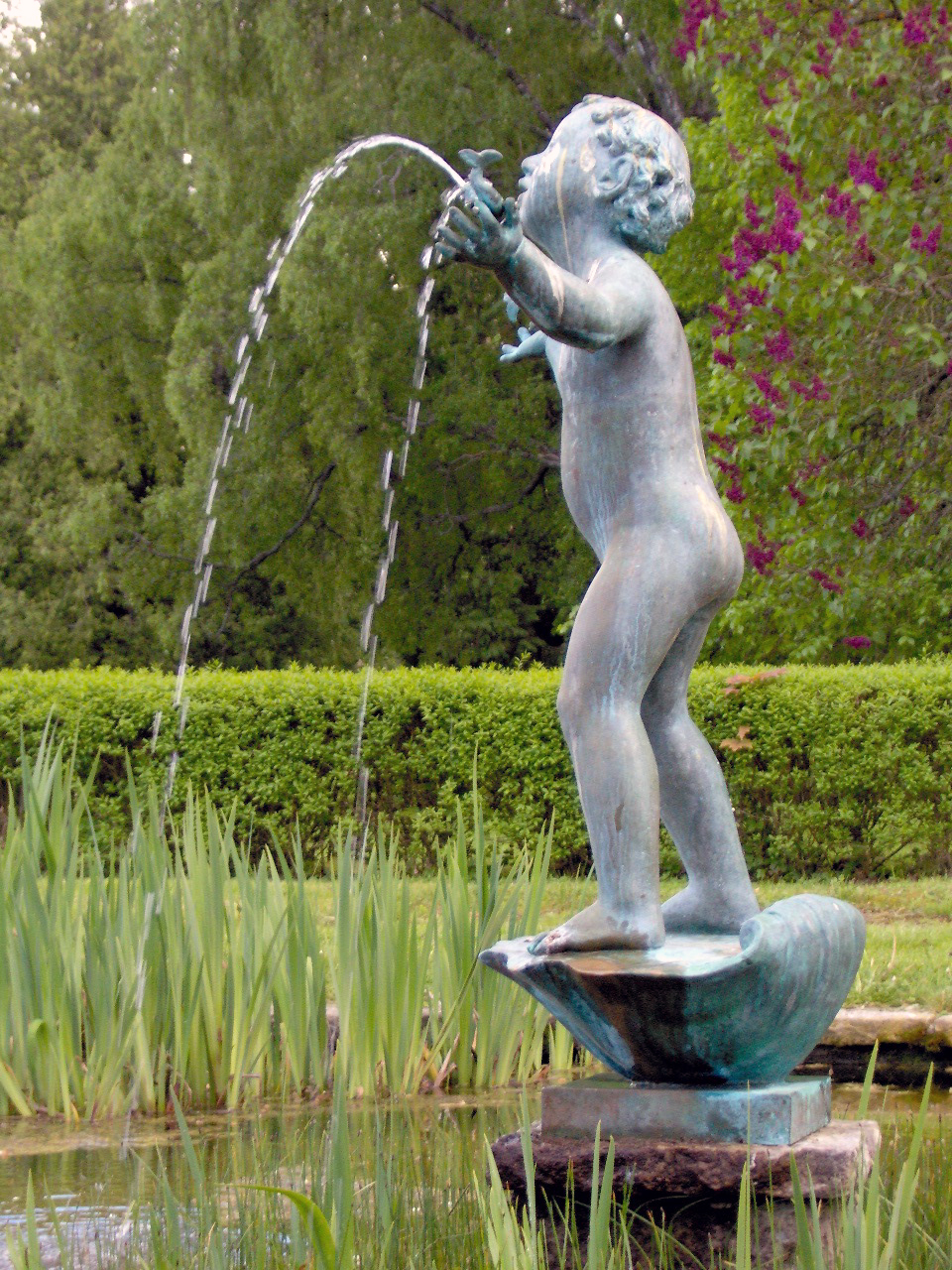
Sculpture and fountain at Ulleråkers Hospital in Uppsala, 1946.

As a portrait sculptor, Taube had "virtuoso skill", portraying children, clowns, and her husband Evert. One of her sculptures of Evert stands on the island of Riddarholmen.

Taube created tin candlesticks, seal stamps, paperweights, cigarette boxes, and inkwells.

Besides sculpting, Taube drew and created color lithographs.

During her marriage, Taube concentrated on being a helper and muse to her husband, to the detriment of her artistic career. At age 78, she was able to return to being a full-time artist until her death at age 82.

The Lisebergsapplåden award, presented annually by the Liseberg amusement park in Gothenburg to someone who has made Sweden a happier place, is a bronze sculpture of two clapping hands created by Taube in 1978.

=== Sculptures ===
- Flicka Med Fisk (bronze)
- Elsa Borg (bronze, 1972) Södermalm, Vitabergsparken, Stockholm.
- Fountain at Ulleråkers Hospital in Uppsala (1946)

=== Lithographs ===
- Sjösalamotiv (5)
- Sjung Eko!

== Exhibitions ==
Queen Silvia of Sweden opened an exhibition of Taube's works at the Röhsska Museum in Gothenburg, Sweden on 15 September 2006. The exhibition was the result of a project to bring public attention to Taube's work, a project started by Brittmo Bernhardsson (the wife of the governor of Gothenburg) and supported by Taube's son Sven-Bertil.

== See also ==
- Evert Taube
- Sven-Bertil Taube
