= Pieter Gerritsz van Roestraten =

Dutch painter

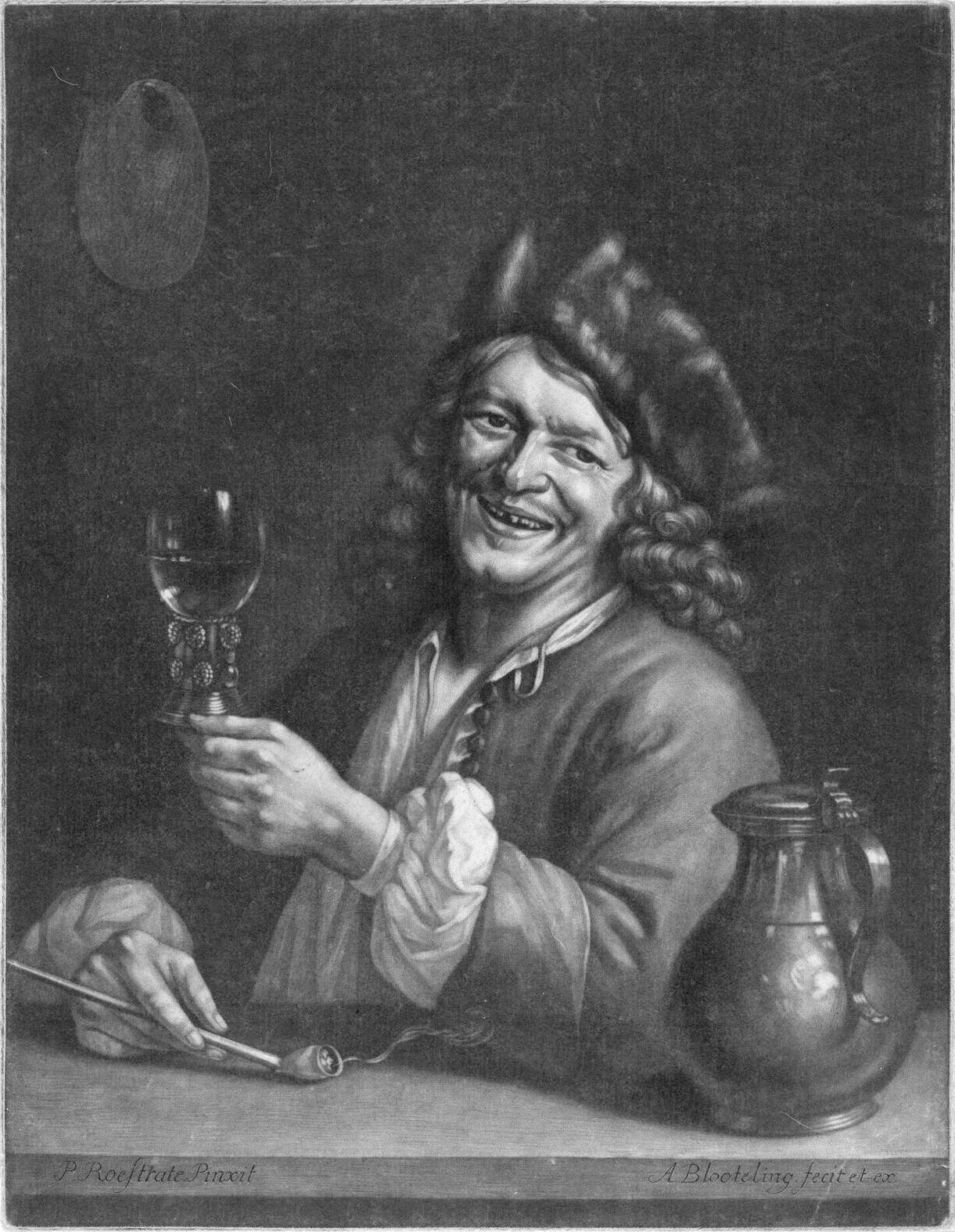
- Pieter Gerritsz van Roestraten, mezzotint by Abraham Bloteling after a self-portrait
- Born: 21 April 1630; Haarlem
- Died: 10 July 1700 (aged 70); London
- Known for: Still life and genre painting

Pieter Gerritsz van Roestraten or Pieter Gerritsz van Roestraeten (21 April 1630 – 10 July 1700) was a Dutch painter of still lifes, in particular floral and vanitas still lifes. He also painted genre scenes and portraits. After starting his career in Haarlem, he worked most of his career in London where he enjoyed the patronage of the highest circles.

== Life ==
Pieter van Roestraten was born in Haarlem in 1630 and baptized on 21 April 1630 as the son of Gerrit Maertenszoon and Sara Meijnerts. His father Gerrit was possibly from Leiden. He was a student of Frans Hals in Haarlem for at least five years starting from 1649. He moved in 1651 to Amsterdam where he lived in the Anthonie Breestraat. On 6 June 1654 he had banns posted to marry a daughter of Frans Hals called Adriaentje who was six year his elder.

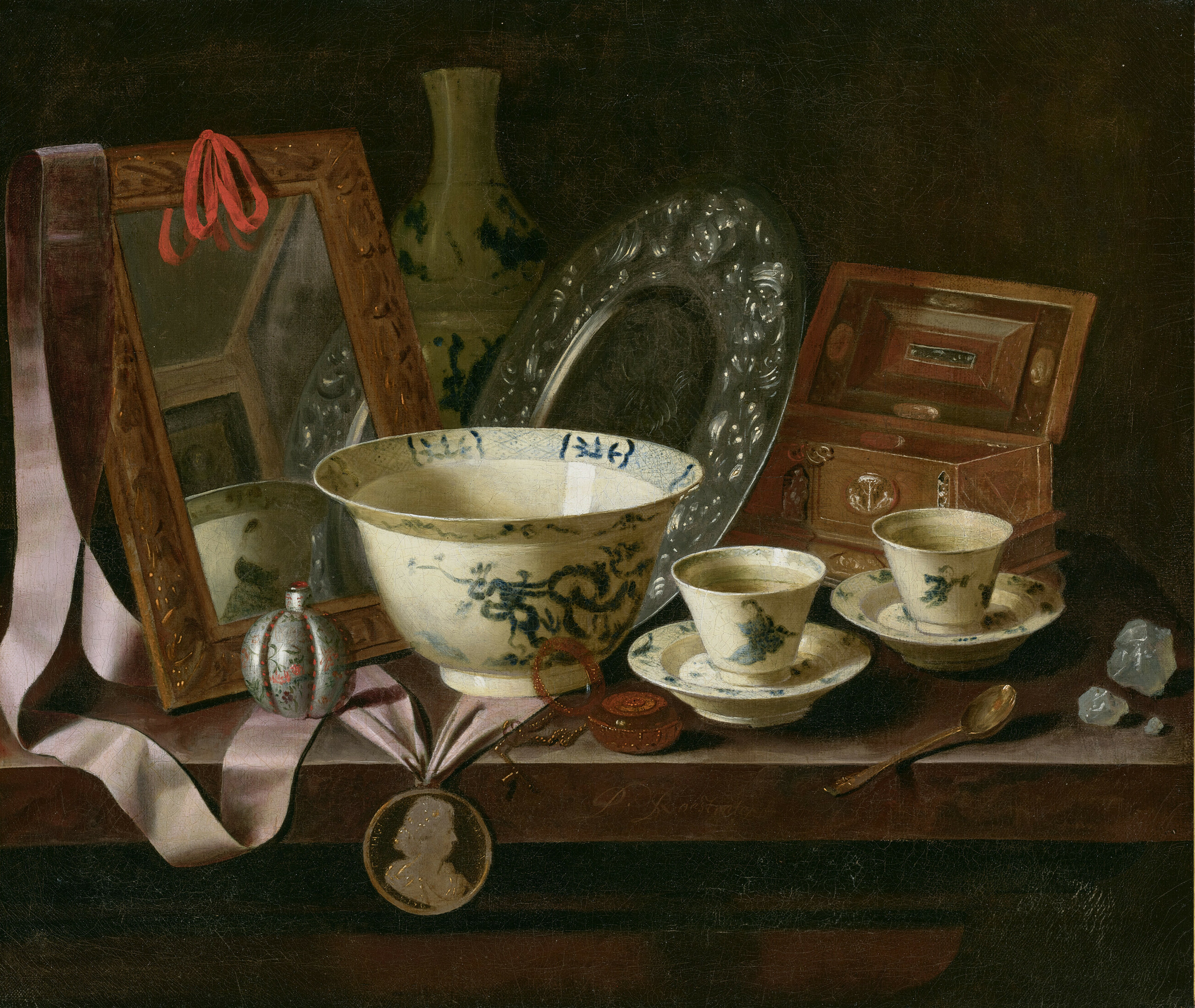
Chinese porcelain cups and a bowl, with a mirror, a silver platter and a portrait medal and other objects on a table

In the same year Reynier Hals, his brother-in-law, made in Amsterdam a disposition for van Roestraten and the Flemish genre painter Daniël Boone. The relationship between Boone and van Roestraten was likely close as van Roestraten may have been the sitter for Boone's picture of A bearded man squeezing a lemon over a roasted bird on a plate. Van Roestraten further moved to work in London around the same time as Boone moved there and like Boone, would live there for the rest of his life.

He lived with his wife in Amsterdam before moving to London in 1666. The same year he suffered a hip injury during the Great Fire of London, which caused him to walk with a limp for the rest of his life. Van Roestraten was likely introduced to Charles II of England by Sir Peter Lely on the condition that he paint no portraits. He took the advice and stuck to still life painting. He was successful as he could earn forty to fifty pounds sterling for a still life. Van Roestraten lived on the south side of King's Street. This put him in close proximity to the Palace of Whitehall and to the studios of other artists, including Peter Lely and John Michael Wright.

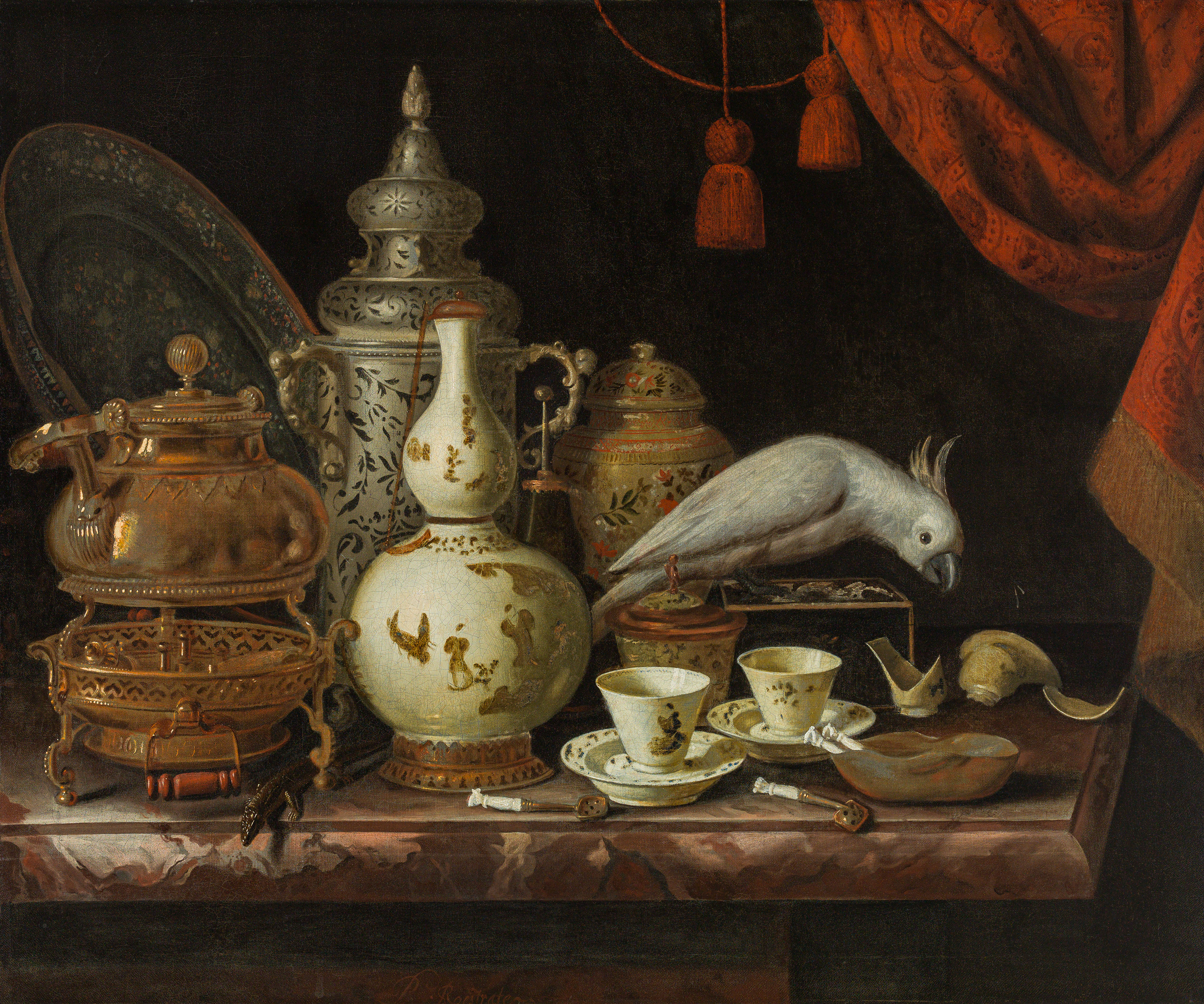
Still life with porcelain, silver and cockatoo

When his first wife died he remarried a younger wife called Clara. He died soon afterwards. He was buried on 10 July 1700 in St. Paul's Cathedral.

== Work ==
Van Roestraten was principally a still life painter. Most of his still lifes are pronkstillevens (i.e. ostentatious still lifes) and vanitas still lifes. In his pronkstillevens he displayed his ability to depict reflective surfaces of metal objects and, in particular, silver. These paintings can to a certain extent be regarded as 'portraits' of the objects owned by his aristocratic patrons. The various objects in these compositions serve as symbols that can be read as an admonition or a life lesson. The objects usually imply a vanitas meaning as they evoke the transience and emptiness of wealth and earthly glory and point to the inevitable extinction of each human life.

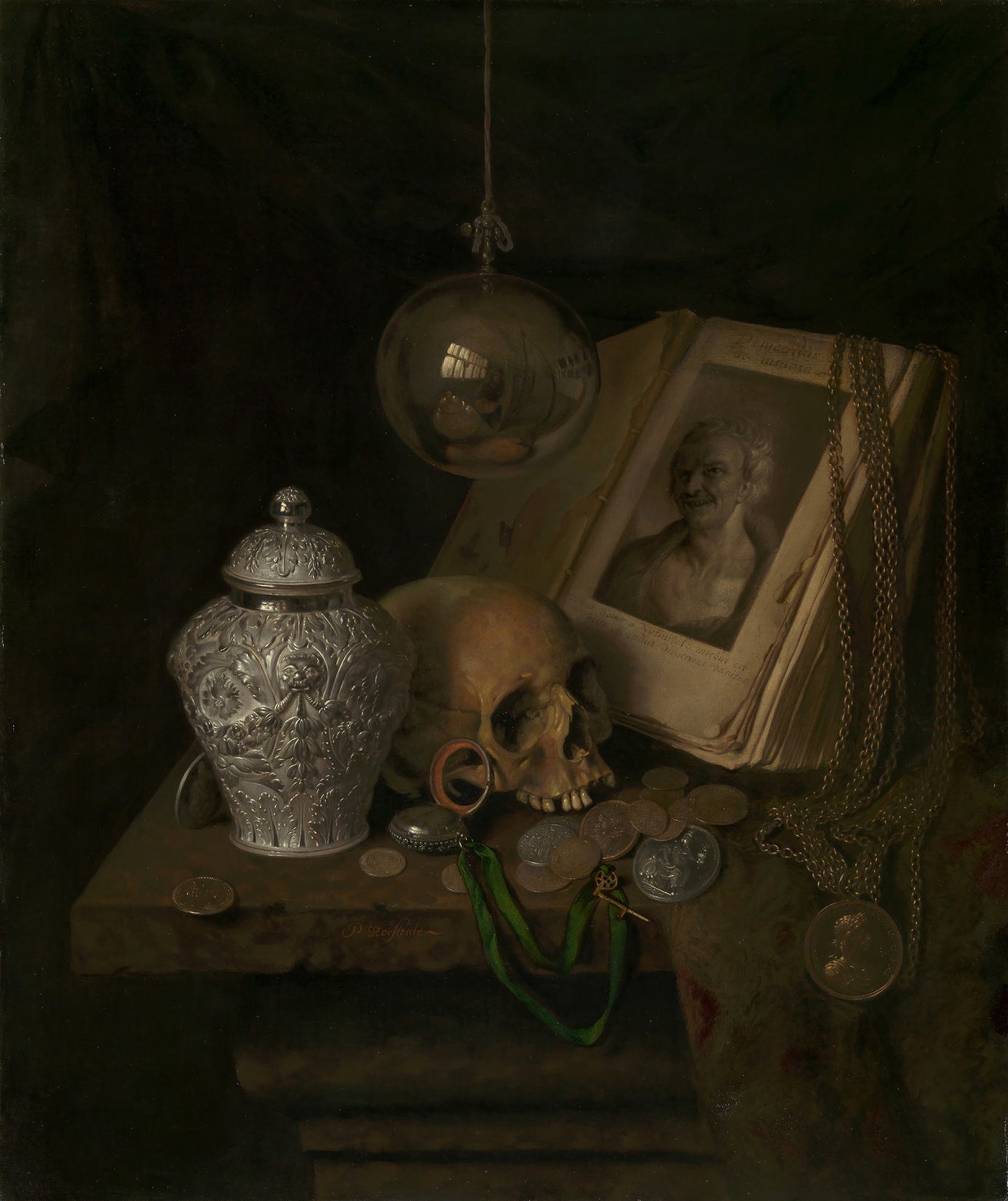
Vanitas still life

An example is the Vanitas still life at the Royal Collection Trust. It includes several objects that invoke the vanitas meaning: a skull, a glass orb and a pocket watch. The book is open at a print of a laughing Democritus inscribed in Latin with lines which can be translated as: 'Everyone is sick from birth / vanity is ruining the world'. In the suspended glass sphere in the composition can be seen the reflection of a room and the figure of an artist looking towards the viewer, probably a self-portrait. Self-portraits have been identified in at least nine of van Roestraten's still lifes.

Van Roestraten painted a number of self-portraits, four of which are preserved. These all show the artist holding objects that appear in his still lifes, including glassware, a clay pipe and a lemon. In one self-portrait he holds a very large wine glass, perhaps in reference to Bacchus or the sense of taste. It may be a reference to Annibale Carracci's Boy Drinking (Cleveland Museum of Art).

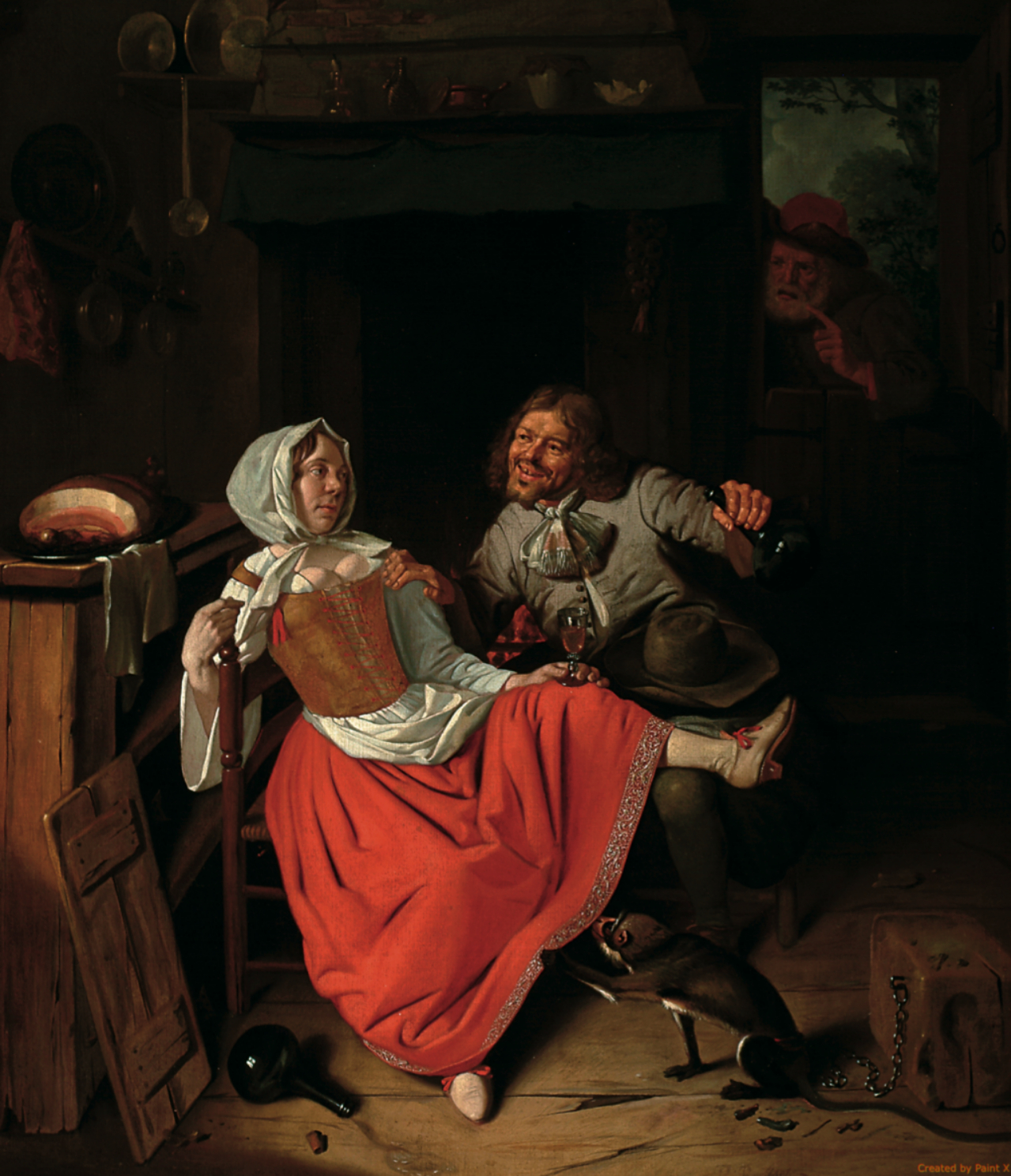
The dissolute kitchen maid

He also painted a number of genre scenes. An example is The Dissolute Kitchen Maid (1665, Frans Hals Museum). While it looks like a scene from daily life, it has a clear erotic meaning. The woman is acting in a shameless manner. A monkey, the symbol of wanton behaviour, leers up her dress. It is on a chain thus reminding us that man is a prisoner of his sinful desires. The picture conveys a moral message, reflected in the old man's raised finger: beware of sinful behaviour.

He influenced Christian Berentz and Robert Robinson. Around 1990 Fred Meijer of the Netherlands Institute for Art History created the notname 'Pseudo-Roestraten' for an unknown artist or artists to whom he attributed a large number of still lifes with books, documents and precious objects in a style somewhat related to that of Pieter van Roestraeten. These works were mainly found in early English collections making it plausible that this artist worked in England around the same time as van Roestraten.
