= Pseudo-Roestraten =

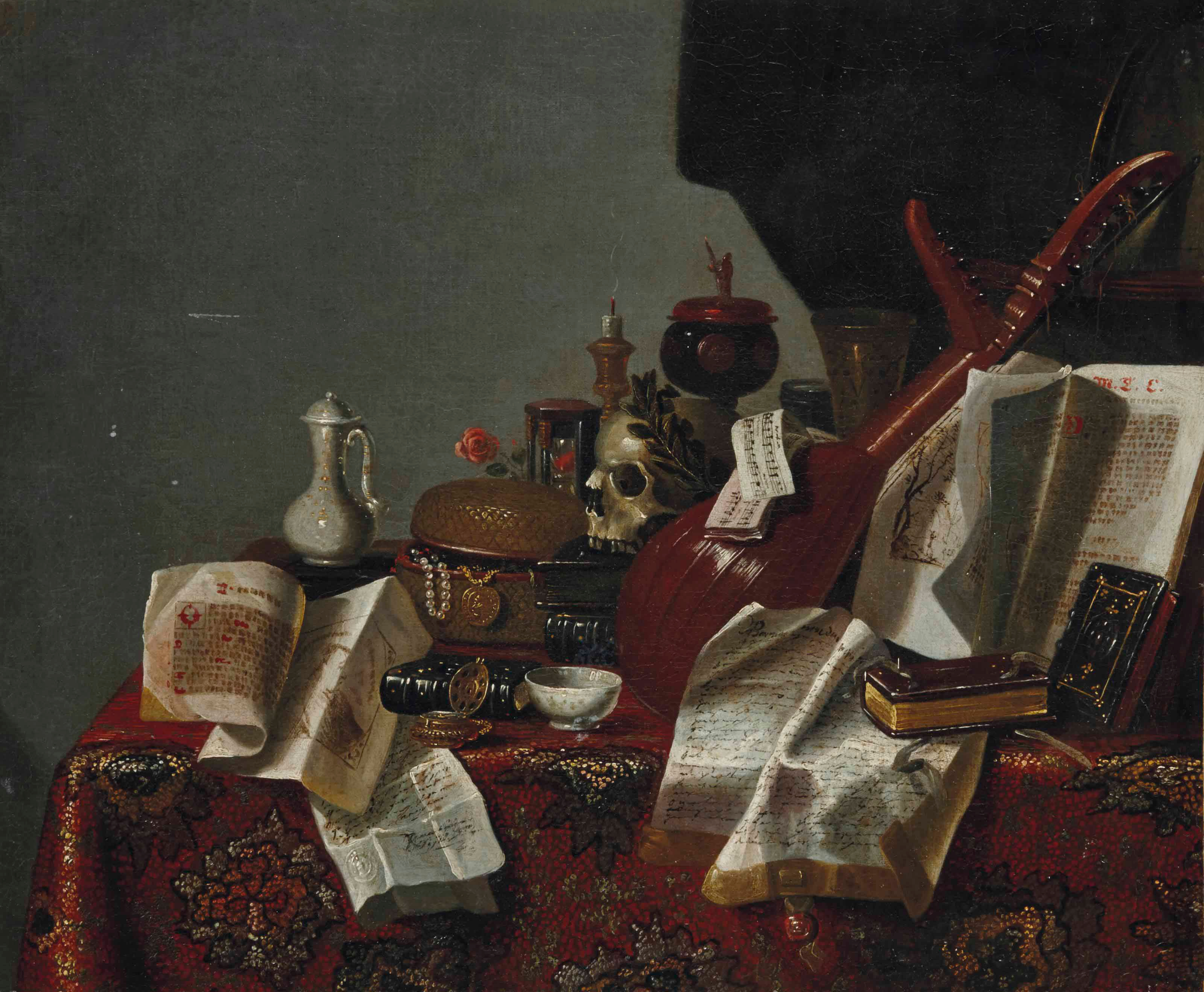
Vanitas with a skull, lute, hourglass, watch, letters and other objects on a table draped with an oriental carpet

Pseudo-Roestraten or Pseudo-Roestraeten is the notname given to an artist or artists to whom or which are attributed a number of vanitas still lifes likely created in the period between 1675 and 1725. The notname was given as the artist's works show some resemblance to that of the Dutch painter Pieter Gerritsz van Roestraten. Recurring elements of the paintings are arrangements of books, documents and precious objects with a vanitas meaning displayed on oriental carpets. The artist(s) may have been of German or Scandinavian origin. Many works of the anonymous artist are or were held in English collections, which makes it likely that the artist worked for some time in England.

== Identification of the oeuvre ==
Around 1990 Fred G. Meijer of the Netherlands Institute for Art History created the notname 'Pseudo-Roestraten' for an unknown artist or unknown artists to whom he attributed a large number of still lifes with books, documents and precious objects in a style somewhat reminiscent of that of Pieter van Roestraeten. As the execution and quality of the work are inconsistent it is possible that this composite body of work was created by multiple artists, possibly of Scandinavian or German origin.

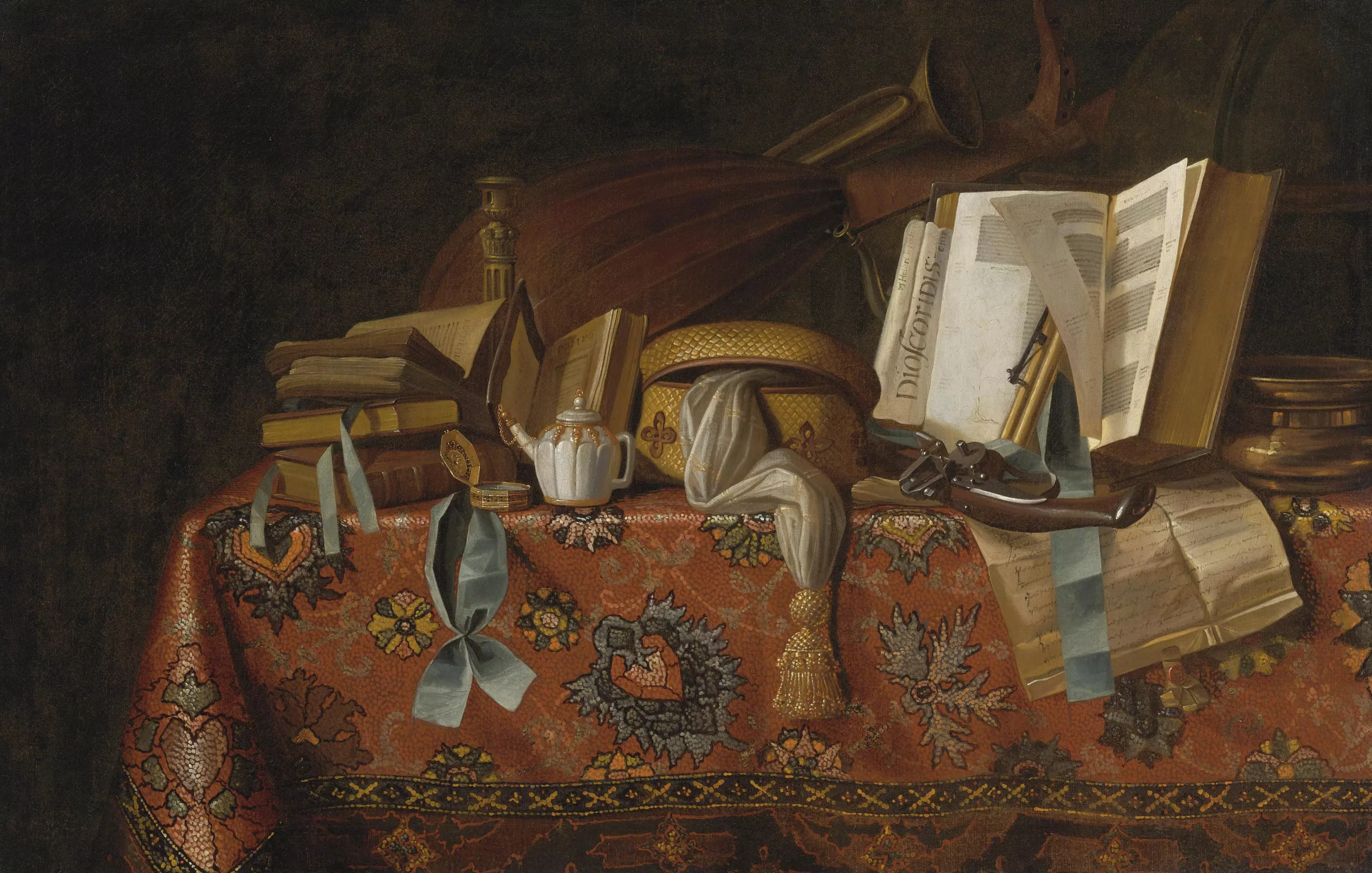
Still life of books, musical instruments and other objects on a table draped with an oriental carpet

An old man reading in one of the works shows similarities to the work of the Swedish painter Christian von Thum while another work auctioned at Sotheby's on 6 July 1999 bore the partially readable signature 'Johan Krog... Anno 1689'. As many works were held in early collections in England (such as a series of six overdoor pieces from Longleat House auctioned at Christie's on 14 June 2002), the artist or artists may have been based in England.

== Work ==
The works attributed to the Pseudo-Roestraten typically depict all kinds of objects on a table or ledge, which is covered with a red oriental carpet. These objects are the typical symbols found in so-called vanitas still lifes. This genre of still life aims to evoke the meaninglessness of earthly life and the transient nature of all earthly goods and pursuits through the use of stock symbols, which reference the transience of things, the brevity of life and, in particular, the futility of earthly wealth and glory: skulls, soap bubbles, candles, smoking utensils, empty glasses, wilting flowers, insects, smoke, watches, hourglasses mirrors, books and musical instruments, and various expensive or exclusive objects such as jewellery, silverware and rare shells.

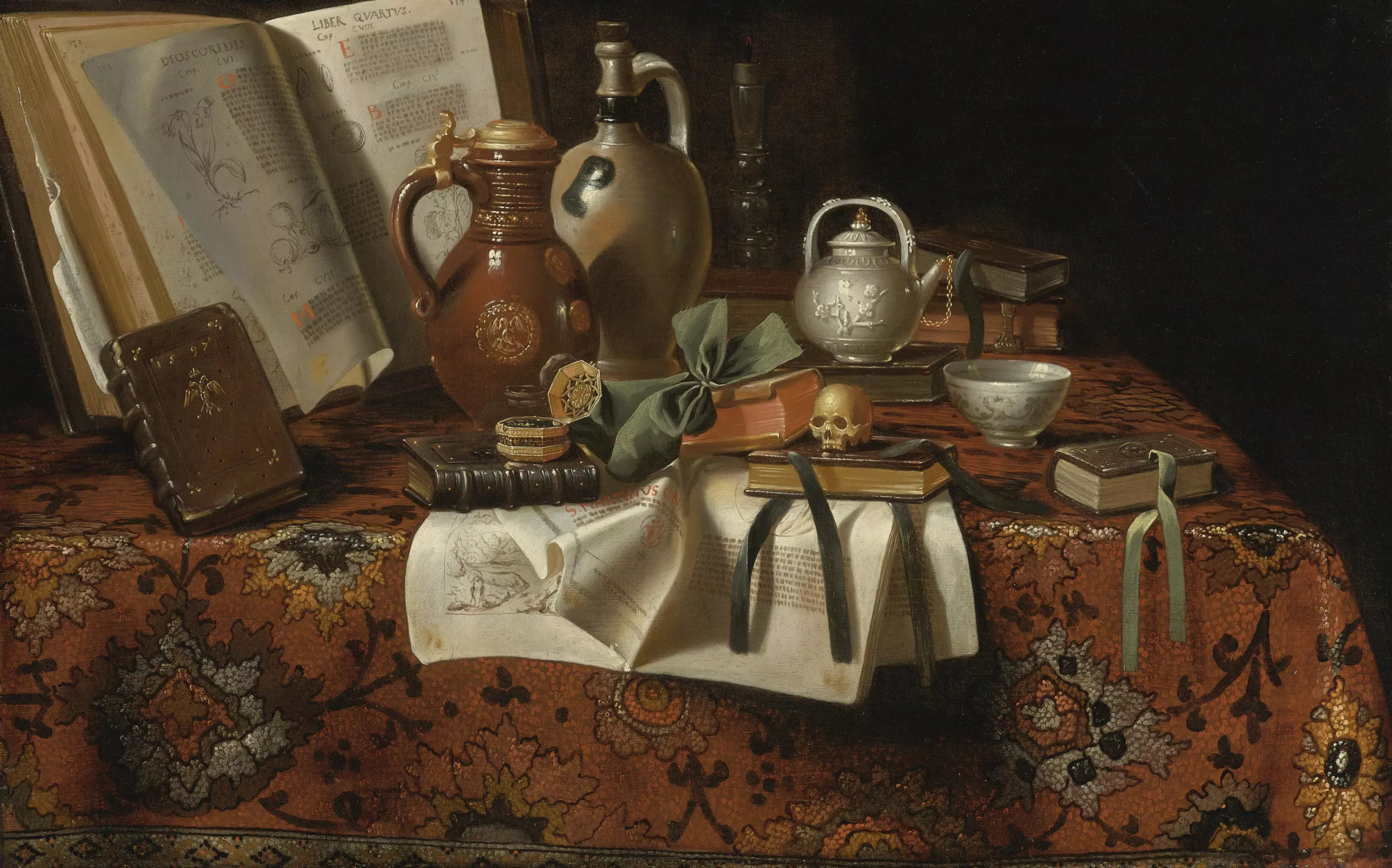
Vanitas with books, jugs, a skull and other objects on a table draped with an oriental carpet

The term vanitas is derived from the famous line 'Vanitas, Vanitas. Et omnia Vanitas', in the book of the Ecclesiastes in the bible, which in the King James Version is translated as "Vanity of vanities, all is vanity". The worldview behind the vanitas paintings was a Christian understanding of the world as a temporary place of fleeting pleasures and sorrows from which mankind can only escape through the sacrifice and resurrection of Christ.

While the works of the Pseudo-Roestraten share the subject matter and style of van Roestraeten, their execution is more rigid. The works also typically include oriental carpets which are painted in a distinctive dotted style of paint. Many of the works were formerly attributed to van Roestraeten on the art market.
