= Lejonkulan =

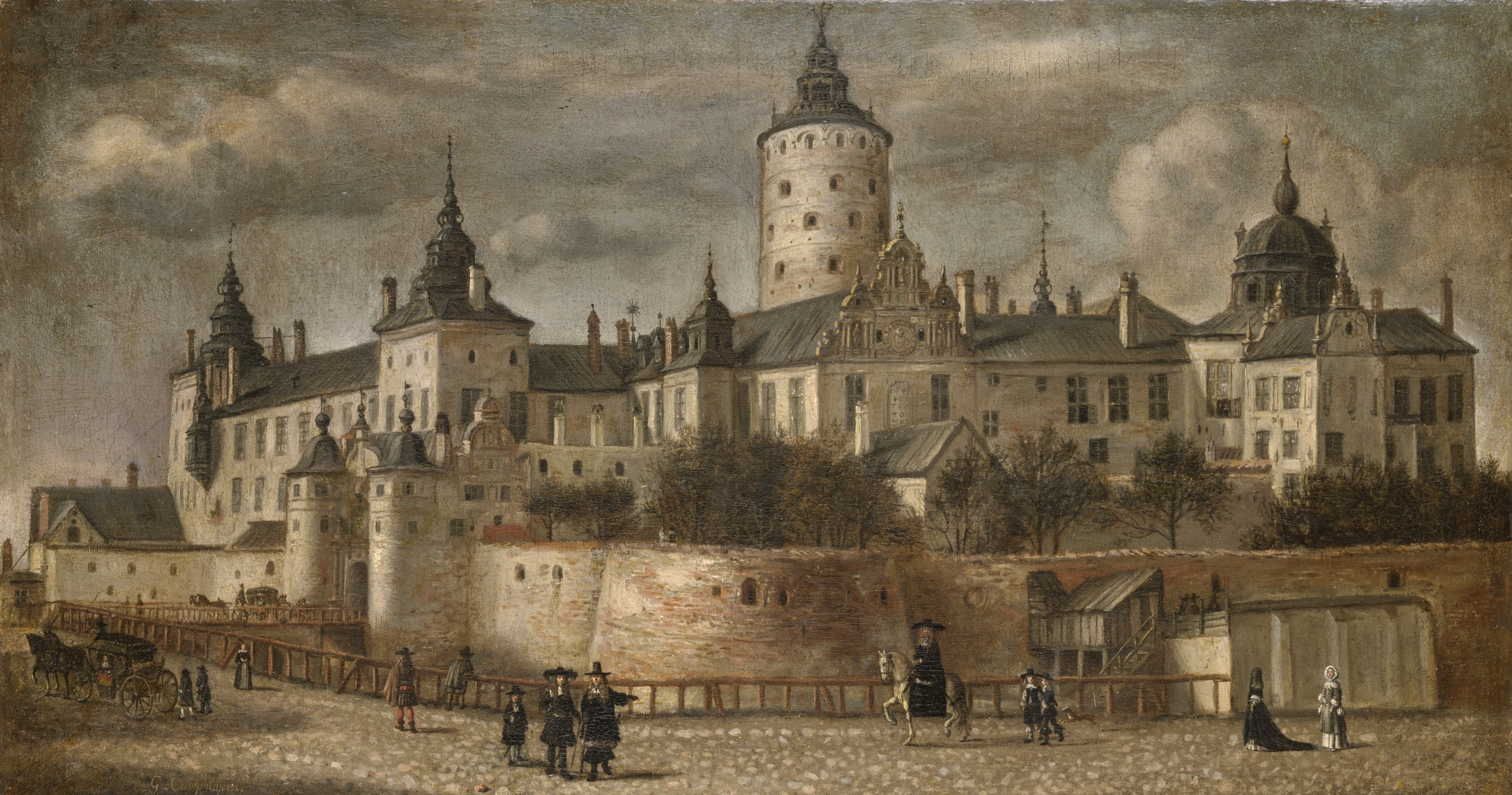
Painting of the Tre kronor castle by Govert Camphuysen from 1661. The building Lejonkulan can be seen on this picture to the right outside the wall. However, the building has been proven to be much large than what this painting illustrates.

Lejonkulan (In English: The Lion's Den), was a historical theatre in Stockholm, Sweden, active in 1667–89. It's the historically second known theatre establishment of Stockholm, after Björngårdsteatern (1640–55).

== History ==
Lejonkulan was a building down in and over the partly dry moat at the south corner of the royal palace Tre Kronor. From 1648, it was commonly known by the name "Lejonkulan" ("The Lion's Den"), because a lion, a tribute from the storming of Prague during the Thirty Years War, was kept there during the reign of Queen Christina of Sweden. It was constructed with a stable for the lion, an apartment for its retainer, and spectators galleries around an arena: during the coronation of Christina, the lion was made to fight other animals in it.

The lion died in 1663. It was thereafter used as a riding hall for Charles XI and a storage for the castle armories. Just like two other buildings nearer the palace, the Little Bollhuset and the Great Bollhuset, it was occasionally used by the various foreign theater companies performing in Stockholm in the 17th-century, where there was not yet any professional native theater. Lejonkulan as a theatre has therefore often been confused with Bollhuset Theatre, in turn confused between Stora Bollhuset and Lilla Bollhuset, as the three buildings were all on and off used for theatrical performances Stockholm in parallel during the same period.

Research has proven Lejonkulan to have been a very large building, and the painting by Govert Camphuysen from 1661 depicting it as small has been deemed not to have been proportionate.

In 1667, Lejonkulan was redecorated and inaugurated as a theater by the Dutch theater company of Jan Baptista van Fornenbergh, who signed a contract to perform annually for the Swedish royal court the same year. Foreign theater companies were hired to perform for the court, often from France, Germany and the Netherlands, as Sweden did not have any theater tradition and therefore no native actors. Among the companies performing where those of Johann Christoffer Loner 1662-64 and 1668–69, Johann August Ulich 1668 in and 1696–97, David Müllstreich 1686-87 and 1691, and Sebastiano di Scio in 1688-89 and 1695-96. Because both Lejonkulan and the two Bollhus theaters were used as theater localities at the same time, there are confusion as in exactly which building they performed while visiting Stockholm.

In 1686, the first Swedish language theater was opened in Lejonkulan. This was an all-male student theater troupe composed of non professional students from Uppsala, but their performances were open to the public. They were given royal protection and the Lejonkulan Theater was reserved for them the following three years. In 1689, the theatre was moved to Bollhuset, which was renovated as a permanent local for the theatre in 1699.

It was long unknown what happened to Lejonkulan: some sources claim Lejonkulan burned down in 1689, while others assert that the change was made for artistic reasons, and that Lejonkulan burned down with the royal palace in 1697. Research has proven, that Lejonkulan was somewhat damaged by fire in 1685, and though repaired and continued to be used as a theater, the fire caused it to be judged as a fire hazard, which caused it to be demolished in 1689.

== Actors and companies in the Theater of Lejonkulan ==
The following troupes likely also performed at the theatres of Little and Great Bollhuset.

=== The Dutch troupe 1667-1674 ===
This troupe opened the Theater with the play Orontes en Satira by Magnon in February 1667.

- Salomon Fino
- Jan Baptista van Fornenberg, 1624-1697, director of the troupe.
- Helena Heusen, 1622-1680.
- Daniel Loodewicx
- Anna Parkar-Boonefaes
- Geertruyt Rijndorp-Boonefaes
- Dorotea van Fornenbergh

=== The Dutch troupe 1680-1684 ===
This troupe performed the play Disa for the public in 1684, and thus, the theater is known to be more than a court theater from this point forward.

- Gillis Nozeman, husband of Ariana Nozeman
- Trial Parkar
- Jacob Sammers, 1632-1689.

=== The Swedish student-troupe from Uppsala 1686–1691 ===
This (all male) troupe was made up of idealistic students. It had played in Uppsala 1682-86. They were moved to the locals in Bollhuset in 1689.

- Olaus Rudbeck the Younger
- Johan Celsius
- Isaak Börk, the director of the company
- Carl Johan Ollieqvisth
- Andreas Strömbergh
- Georg Törnqvist-Adlercreutz, actor, writer and translator
- Johan Widman

== See also ==
- Björngårdsteatern
