= Evert Taube =

Musical artist (1890-1976)

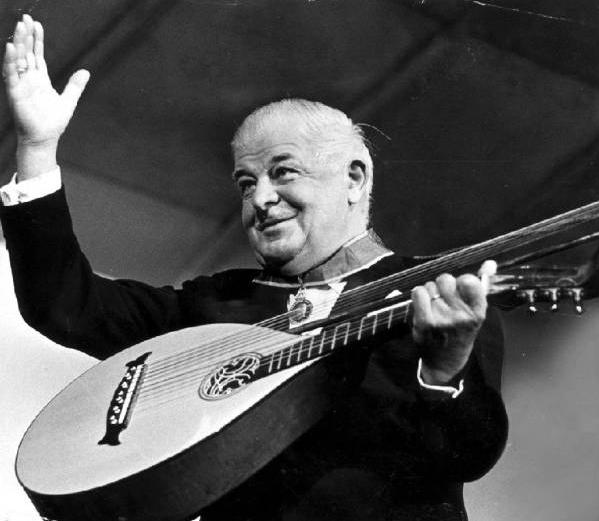
- Evert Taube in 1961.

Background information
- Born: Axel Evert Taube; 12 March 1890; Gothenburg, Sweden
- Died: 31 January 1976 (aged 85) Stockholm, Sweden
- Occupations: Musician, singer-songwriter, author
- Instruments: Lute, guitar
- Years active: 1918–1974

Axel Evert Taube (Swedish pronunciation: [ˈěːvɛʈ ˈʈoːb]; (Note: In isolation, Taube is pronounced [ˈtoːb].) 12 March 1890 – 31 January 1976) was a Swedish singer, composer, and writer. He is widely regarded as one of Sweden's most respected musicians and the foremost troubadour of the Swedish ballad tradition in the 20th century.

== Early life ==
Evert Taube was born in 1890 in Gothenburg, and brought up on the island of Vinga, Västergötland, where his father, Carl Gunnar Taube, a ship's captain, was the lighthouse keeper. His mother was Julia Sofia Jacobsdotter. Taube belongs to an untitled branch of the Baltic German noble Taube family, introduced at the Swedish House of Nobility in 1668 as noble family No. 734.

== Career ==
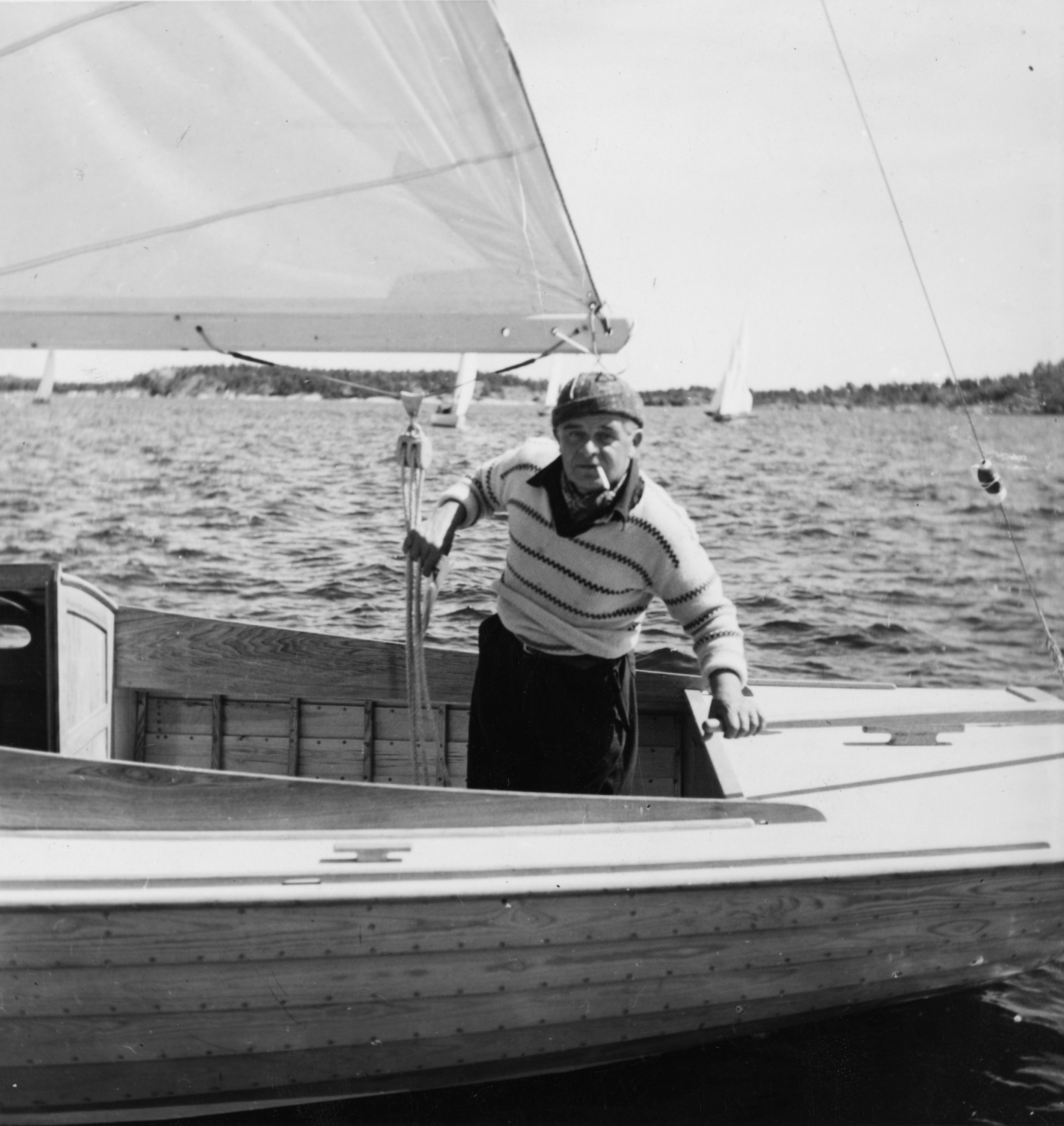
Taube at Sandhamnsregattan in 1942 on his Nordic Folkboat F-S74 Carmencita of Sjösala.

Having spent two years (1907–1909) sailing around the Red Sea, Ceylon and South Africa, Taube began his career as a singer-songwriter and collector of sailors' songs, and on Christmas Eve 1908, on board the Norwegian ship SS Bergen headed for Spain, he performed "Turalleri, piken fra Hamburg".

Following a five-year stay (1910–1915) in Argentina, he developed an interest in Latin American music and introduced the Argentinian tango to Sweden in the twenties. Contrary to widespread perceptions, Taube did not work as a gaucho (cowboy) on the Pampas but as a foreman supervising workers who were digging canals designed to prevent flooding on the vast plains.

He is perhaps best known as a depictor of the idyllic, with motifs from the Swedish archipelagoes and from the Mediterranean, from a perspective every Swedish four-week holiday tourist could recognize. But he also wrote the most hard-hitting anti-fascist anti-war poem in the Swedish language, "Målaren och Maria Pia", about the Italian war in Abyssinia, from the late 1930s. He also composed the anthem of the budding environmental movement in the 1970s, "Änglamark" (originally written for the successful 1971 Hasse & Tage film The Apple War).

Taube's literary secretary Inga-Britt Fredholm worked as a secretary at the Park Avenue Hotel in Gothenburg starting in the late 1950s. There, in 1962, Evert Taube met her and this led to her becoming his literary secretary for more than ten years. During the 1964–1965 period she undertook travel for work, along with Taube, going to the Antibes in France and to the Pampas in Argentina. She collaborated with Astri Taube on "Vid tiden för Astri och Apollon: okända dikter och berättelser", published in 1964.

During the 1960s Fredholm collected Evert Taube's stories and published them in eight volumes at Albert Bonniers Förlag under the shared title of "Samlade berättelser med tillhörande visor och ballader", released 1966–1967. In the 1970s she produced two pictorial biographies of Taube: ”När jag var en ung caballero: en bildbiografi" (1970) and ”Kom i min famn: Evert Taube 1920-1971 : en bildbiografi" (1972).

Among Taube's most famous songs are "Calle Schewens vals", "Min älskling (du är som en ros)", "Dans på Sunnanö", "Brevet Från Lillan", "Flickan i Havanna", "Änglamark", "Sjösala vals", "Fritiof och Carmencita", "Så skimrande var aldrig havet" and "Så länge skutan kan gå".

In 1976 he released an album of songs (on SR Records) about and by Sweden's 18th-century bard, Carl Michael Bellman, performing 9 of Bellman's Fredman's Epistles including the ever popular Vila vid denna källa, Ulla! min Ulla! säj, får jag dig bjuda, and Solen glimmar blank och trind.

Taube has been translated into English by Helen Asbury, Paul Britten Austin, Emily Melcher and others. His songs have been recorded in English by Roger Whittaker, Sven-Bertil Taube, Martin Best, Roger Hinchliffe and Emily Melcher.

== Personal life ==
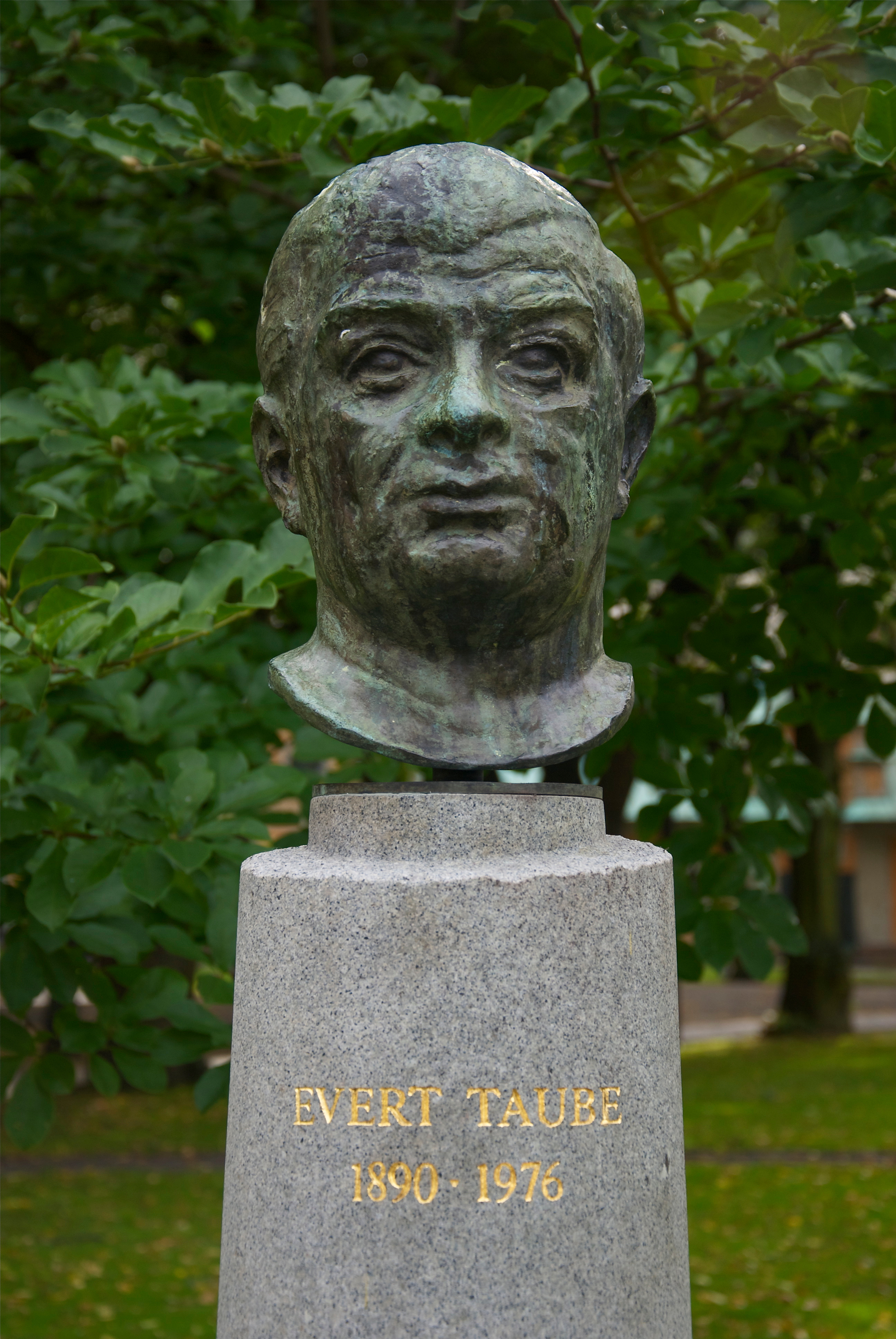
Taube's memorial on the churchyard of Maria Magdalena Church, Stockholm (1976).

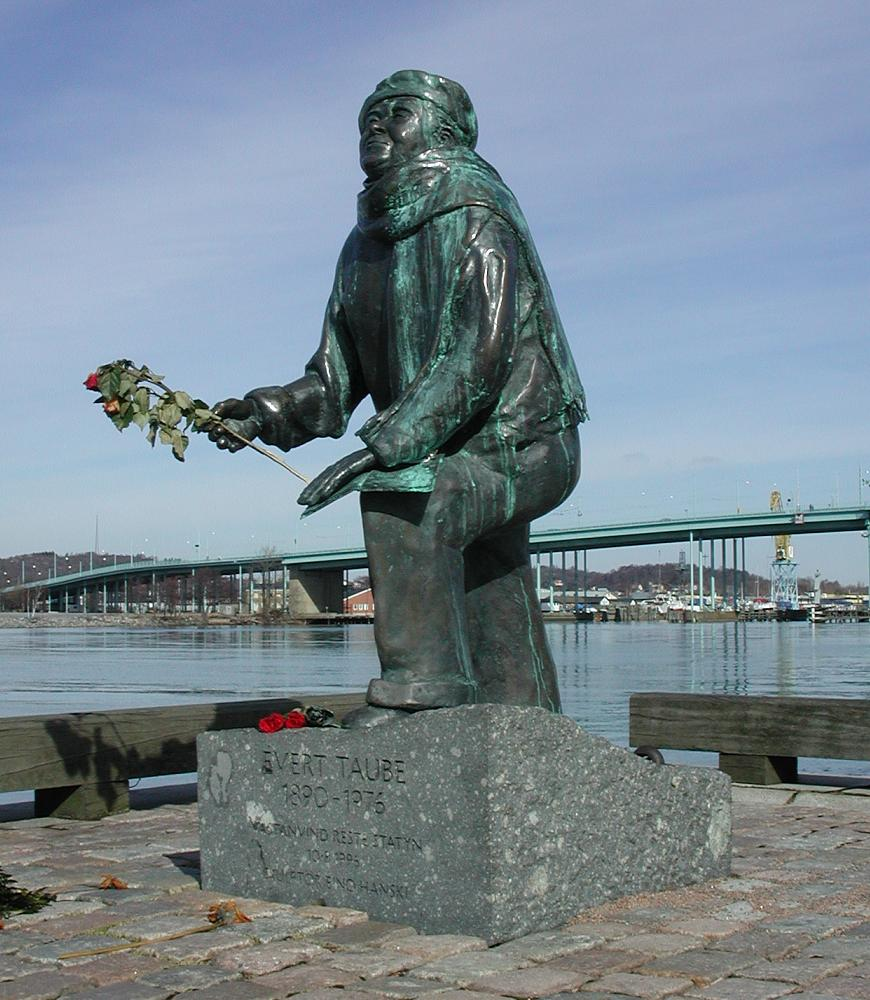
Sculpture in bronze of Evert Taube by Eino Hanski at Gothenburg opera house in Gothenburg (1996).

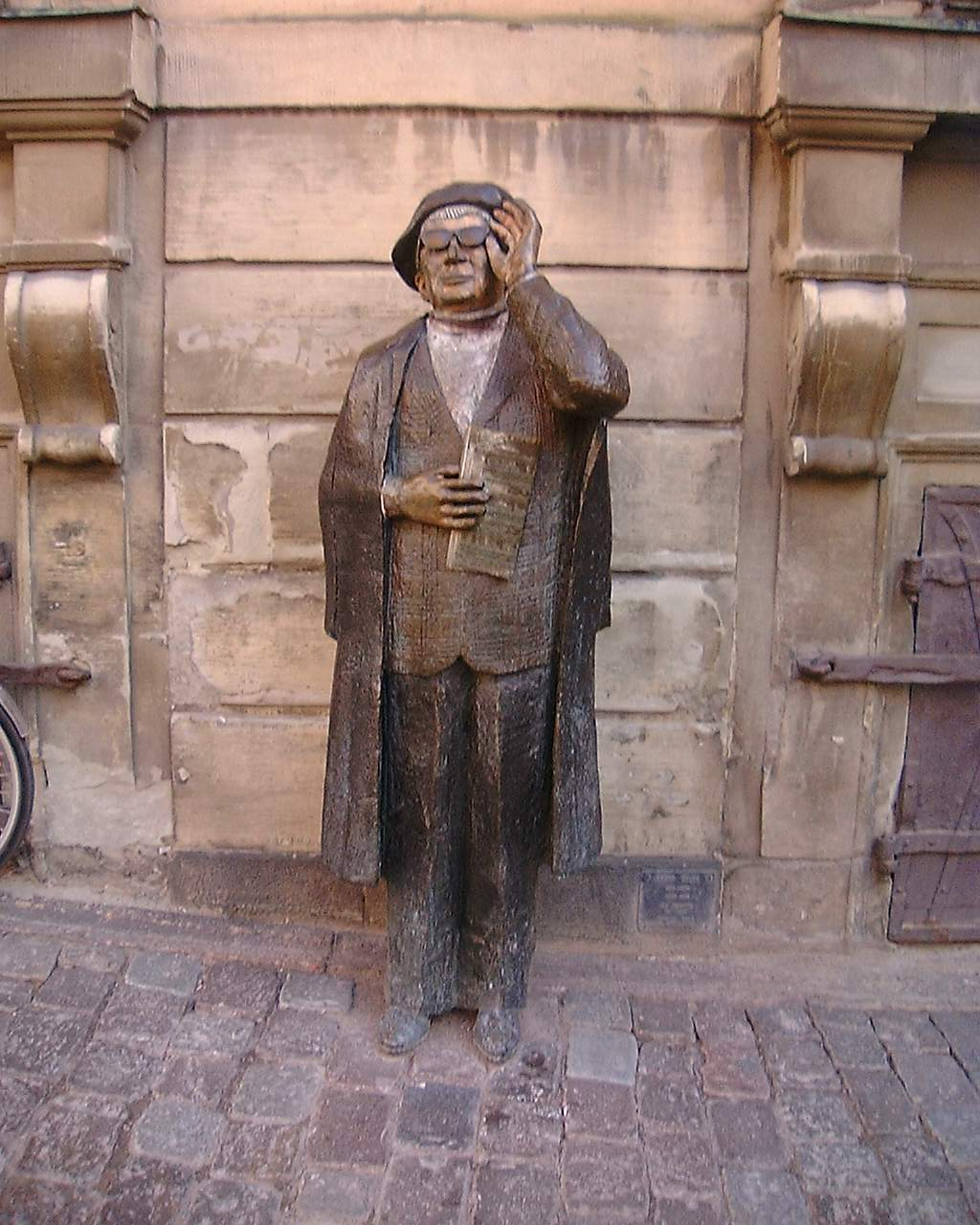
Statue of Evert Taube at Järntorget in Stockholm (1985).

In 1925, he married Astri Bergman Taube, a painter and sculptor.

Taube is the father of Sven-Bertil Taube who also was a well known musician and actor in Sweden. Sven-Bertil along with covering his fathers songs also covered other poets and artists such as Carl Michael Bellman and Nils Ferlin.

Taube died in Stockholm and is buried on the churchyard of Maria Magdalena Church on Södermalm.

Taube had a summer house called Sjösala, located in Stavsnäs, which was burned down by Mona Wallén-Hjerpe in 1969.

== Honors ==
On his 60th birthday in 1950, Taube received the Bellman Award from the Swedish Academy and in 1960 he received an honorary doctorate from University of Gothenburg. He was elected as a member of the Royal Swedish Academy of Music in 1970.

Taube is regarded as one of the finest troubadours in Sweden. There is a complete pavilion, "Evert Taube's World" opened in 2008, dedicated to him at Liseberg Theme Park in Gothenburg.

On 25 March 2010, Norwegian Air Shuttle's (Norwegian.com) new Boeing 737-8FZ LN-NOV (msn 31713) was accepted at the Oslo (Gardermoen) base with the tail image of Evert Taube.

On 6 April 2011, the Bank of Sweden announced that Taube's portrait would feature on the 50 kronor banknote, beginning in 2014–15.

On 12 March 2013, a Google Doodle was dedicated to him.

== Children ==
1. Per-Evert Arvid Joachim Taube (1926–2009)
2. Rose Marie Astrid Elisabet Taube (1928–1928)
3. Ellinor Gunnel Astri Elisabeth Taube (1930–1998)
4. Sven-Bertil Gunnar Evert Taube (1934–2022)

== Publications ==
- Sjösalaboken (1942), with illustrations by Roland Svensson.

== Biography in English ==
- I Come From A Raging Sea 1967
- A History of Swedish Literature 1989
- A History of Swedish Literature 1996

== See also ==
- List of Swedes in music
