= Eino Hanski =

Swedish author, dramatist and sculptor

- Born: 17 July 1928; Leningrad, Soviet Union
- Died: 17 August 2000 (aged 72); Gothenburg, Sweden
- Occupations: Author, dramatist, sculptor

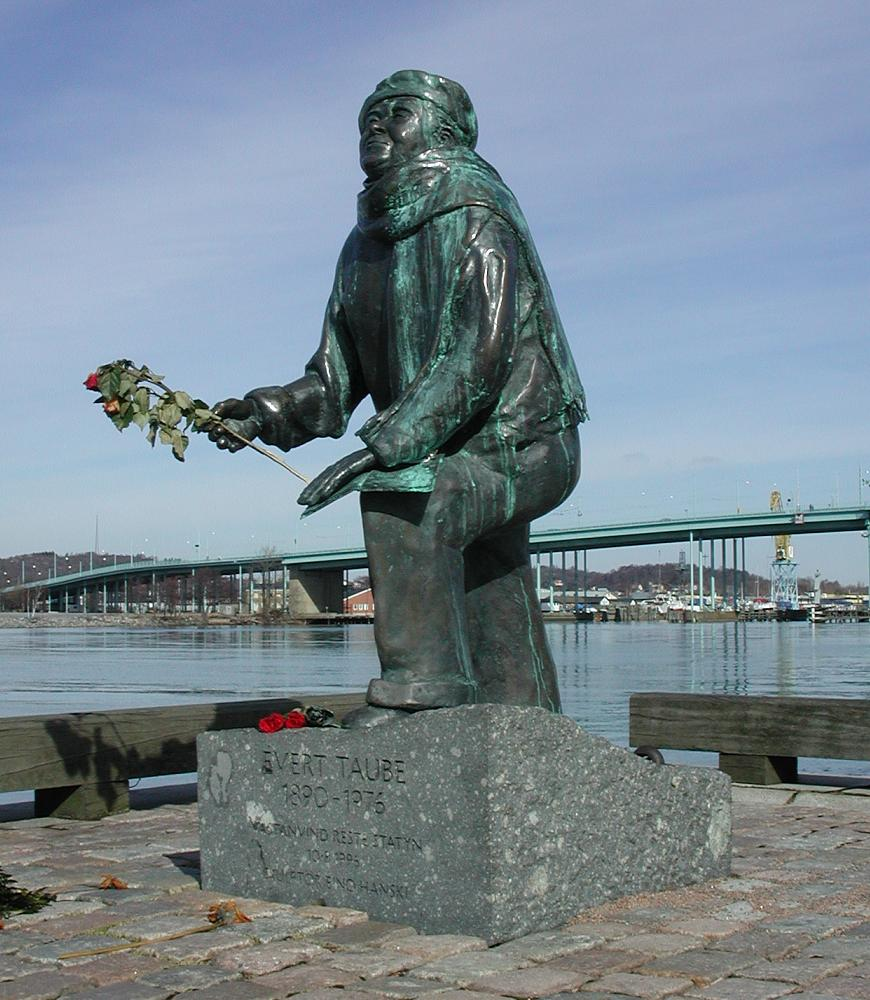
Sculpture of Evert Taube by Hanski

Eino Hanski (17 July 1928 – 17 August 2000) was a Swedish author, dramatist and sculptor.

Hanski was born in Leningrad in the Soviet Union to a Finnish father and a Karelian-Finnish mother. Russian became his main language growing up, but most of his books were written in Swedish. Hanski came to Sweden in 1945 with his mother as a refuge from World War II. His father died in the war.

Hanski lived in Gothenburg but returned to the Soviet Union many times; and it is also the subject of many of his writings. He died in Gothenburg at the age of 72.
