= Christian Thum =

Christian Thum also known as von Thum, Thumb, Theun and Thun (d. 1655), was a Swedish (originally German) actor and theater director. He belongs to the earliest identifiable professional actors active in Sweden, was the leader of the theater of the Swedish royal court in 1628-1645, and the founder of the likely first theater in Sweden and Scandinavia, Björngårdsteatern (1640).

== Life ==
Christian Thum was originally from Germany, but it is unknown from where. He himself stated that he had been active in Sweden since 1615, but he is confirmed as such for the first time in Kalmar in 1624. His son Christian von Thum was born around 1625 in Kalmar and would later become a still life painter, decorative painter, set painter, copyist, art agent and innkeeper. Christian Thum performed a theater play for queen Maria Eleonora of Brandenburg in 1628. From then until 1637 he was engaged at her court as an actor, though not much is known of his activity.

In 1637, he was transferred to the court of queen Christina of Sweden and is explicitly named director of the royal court theater: the regency government regarded a theater as a useful pedagogic method for the child monarch, and Thum had the monopoly of theater performances at the royal court. Only fragments is known of the activity of Thum. It is assumed that he performed English style theater, which was still the dominating theater in Germany at the time, though often performed in the German language. The Thum court theater acted on temporary stages and was an all-male theater company: the actors of the theater is unknown, but assumed to have been members of the Hovkapellet, as well as craftsmen from the guild of craftsmen, which traditionally staged theater performances.

Christian Thum bought the tavern Björngårdsteatern in 1640 and was given permission to stage theater there, though nothing is known of this activity either. The last theater performance staged at the royal court by Thum was in 1645: three years later, three foreign theater companies performed in Stockholm, followed by a number of English, German, Dutch and Italian companies, and the monopoly of Thum is estimated to have been discontinued.
