= Taube family =

Baltic German noble family

Taube
- Swedish noble family
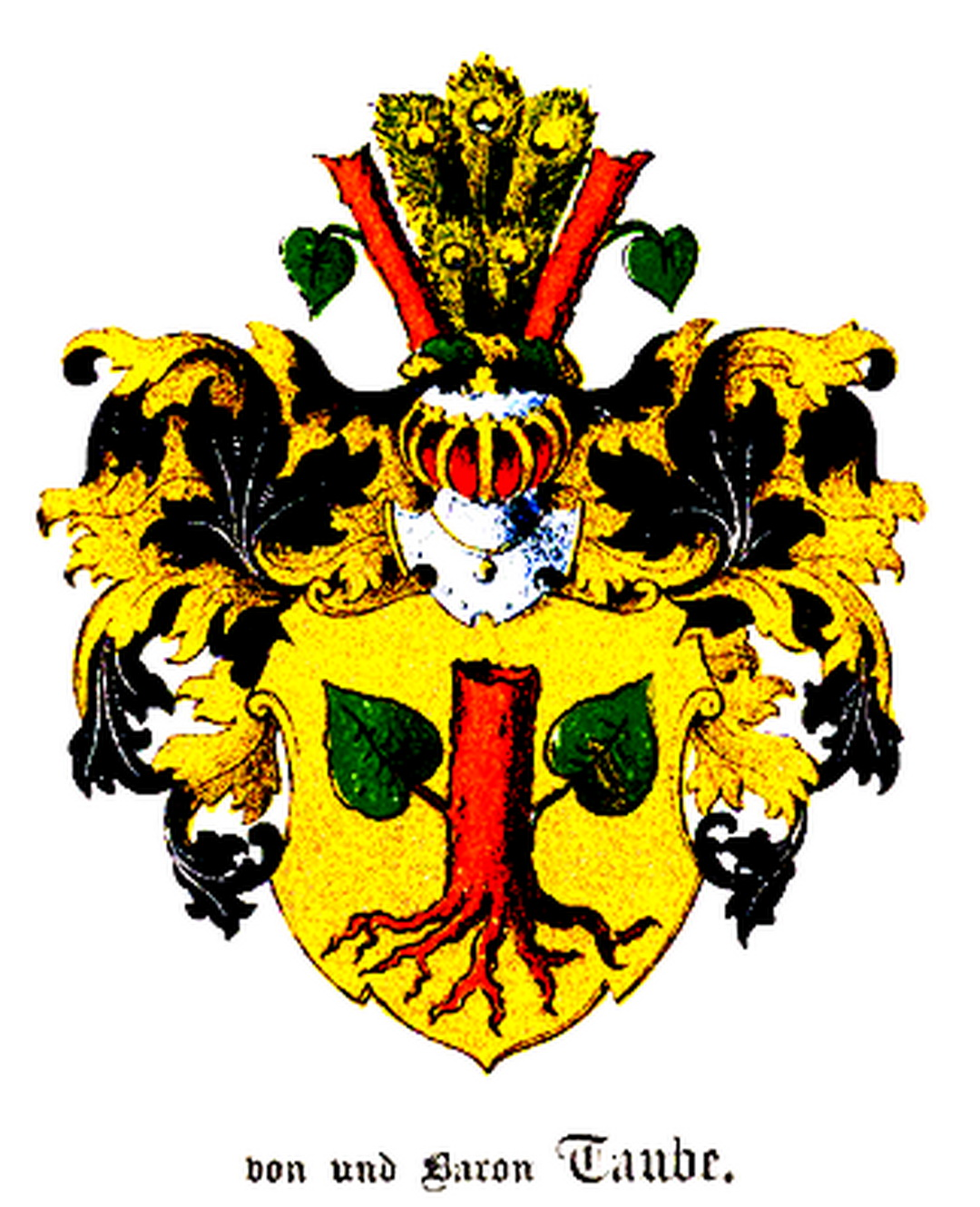
- Coat of arms granted to the Taube family
- Country: Sweden
- Current region: Sweden

The Taube family is an ancient Baltic-German noble family settled in Jutland, whose earliest roots can be traced to Westphalia, Germany.

== History ==
The family historic references: Engelke Tuve (Taube) 1373 Danish vassal in Estonia. Another branch is known to have existed on the feudal estate of Wedewes. The other historic persons: vassals Tuvi Leos and Tuve Collae, 1240 in Estonia.

In the 17th century, during Swedish Empire period, several members of the family joined Swedish kings. Berndt Taube was recognized a Baron (friherre) of Carlöö in Österbotten in 1652. Edvard Taube, was introduced at the Swedish House of Nobility in 1668 and became the ancestor of the untitled noble family Taube (adliga ätten Taube no 734). Also, Edvard's son Fredrik Evert Taube was made a Baron (friherre) in 1692 (Taube of Odenkat) and Fredrik Evert's son Edvard Didrik Taube was made a Count in 1734, becoming the ancestor of the counts of Taube (grevliga ätten Taube no. 112). Another line of counts (grevliga ätten Taube no. 62) is descended from the Governor General of Narva, Ingermanland and Kexholm Jakob Johan Taube of Kuddinge (Livonia) and Sesswegen (Latvia) (1624–1695), whose son, Gustaf Adam (1673–1732), became a count in 1719.

Evert Taube and Sven-Bertil Taube belong to the untitled noble family Taube (no 734).

== Notable members ==
- Hedvig Ulrika Taube (31 October 1714 – 11 February 1744), a Swedish court lady and royal mistress to king Frederick I of Sweden.
- Helene Taube (29 February 1860 - 27 December 1930), Swedish lady in waiting
- Arvid Fredrik Taube (19 January 1853 – 14 October 1916), Swedish aristocrat and minister for foreign affairs
- Baron Nils Taube (25 July 1928 – 11 March 2008), British aristocrat and fundmanager.
