= Roland Svensson =

Swedish painter, writer, black and white artist and illustrator

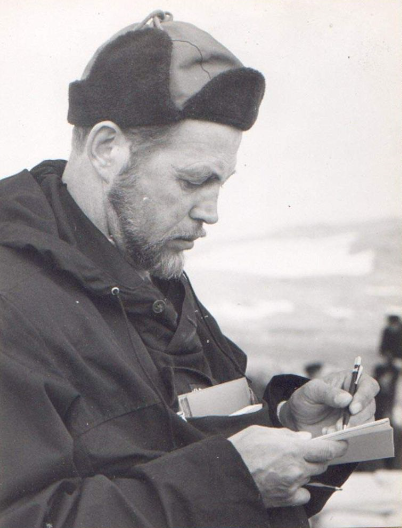
- Roland Svensson aboard the Älvsnabben in 1957
- Born: Gustaf Roland Svensson; 18 January 1910; Stockholm, Sweden
- Died: 31 July 2003 (aged 93); Nacka, Stockholm, Sweden
- Known for: Painting, writer, illustrator

Roland Svensson (18 January 1910 – 31 July 2003), was a Swedish painter, writer, black and white artist, illustrator of books and originals for stamps. He is most noted for his depiction of the Stockholm archipelago. He also wrote several books.

== Biography ==
Svensson sought out his motifs among the islets and skerries around the summer cottage and studio at Stora Tornö, across the Långvik strait on Möja in the Stockholm archipelago. He also wrote books describing the seasonal changes in the archipelago with deep and vivid animation. His style was forceful and impressionistic but not without a strong feeling for decorative elements. He preferred to draw with coal. His views on Swedish nature and Swedish characteristics is close to that of Karl Nordström and Albert Engström. He became much noted through his color lithography's.

In two books by Sven Barthel, Svensson contributed with black and white illustrations as well as water colors and pastel drawings. These books are deemed very Swedish with their harsh simplicity and the true love for nature expressed in them. The books are considered very beautiful and have been called classics in both the literary and artistic sense.

In 1957 and 1958 Svensson participated, as an artist, in arctic expeditions to Spitsbergen and North Cape, Norway aboard the ship Älvsnabben.

Roland Svensson was married to Ingrid and they had two children, Lif (Marriott) and Torbjörn. In 1957, Svensson and his family moved to Villa Wallbeck–Hansen at Storängen, Nacka in Sweden, and it also became Svensson's main studio. This house in the National Romantic style once belonged to artist Anton Genberg. Svensson spent much time on the Isle of Canna in the Inner Hebrides, Scotland where he was a close friend of folklorists John Lorne Campbell and Margaret Fay Shaw. He did many drawings and paintings on both Canna and South Uist

Roland Svensson is buried at Möja church cemetery.

== Illustrated publications ==
=== For other writers ===
- Evert Taube, Sjösalaboken ("The book about Sjösala"), 1942.
- Sven Barthel, Cykloncentrum ("Center of the cyclone"), 1940.
- Sven Barthel, Gillöga ("Gillöga island"), 1945.
- Sven Barthel, Skärgård ("Archipelago"), Stockholm: Bonniers, 1952.
- Iwan Fischerström, Roland Svensson, FIB's art club, 1960.
- Sven Barthel, Strandhugg ("Forays along beaches"), Max Ström, 2000.

=== Own works ===
- Ensliga öar ("Solitary islands"), R&S, 1954.
- Hav och människor ("Sea and humans"), R&S, 1957, extended edition Vingförlaget, 1950.
- Skärgårdsliv i gången tid ("Life in the archipelago in the old days"), Stockholm: Bonniers, 1961.
- Min skärgård och din ("My archipelago and yours"), Bonniers, 1964.
- Ur skissböckerna ("From the sketch books"), Piccolo/LT, 1969.
- Från havet: dagboksanteckningar från en resa ombord i T/T Sea Serpent ("From the sea, diary notes from a journey aboard the T/T Sea Serpent"), Bonniers, 1972.
- Bilder och minnen ("Pictures and memories"), Bonniers, 1981.
- I Roland Svenssons övärld: ett urval ur hundra dagböcker 1946–1960 ("In Roland Svensson's world of Islands – a selection from a hundred diaries 1946–1960"), Bonnier Alba, 1995.
- He also published illustrated books describing the meeting of land and sea around Scotland and distant islands such as Orkney, Shetland, Hebrides and Tristan da Cunha.

=== Further reading ===
- Sörenson, Ulf (2010). Roland Svensson ömänniskan. Stockholm: Max Ström i samarbete med Sällskapet Roland Svenssons vänner. ISBN 978-91-7126-175-5. (in Swedish)

== Exhibitions ==
- Roland Svensson Skärgård, öar och hav ("Archipelago, islands and sea") The Prins Eugen art venue at Waldemarsudde, Stockholm, 18 September 2010 – 16 January 2011, retrospective.
