= Mörtnäs =

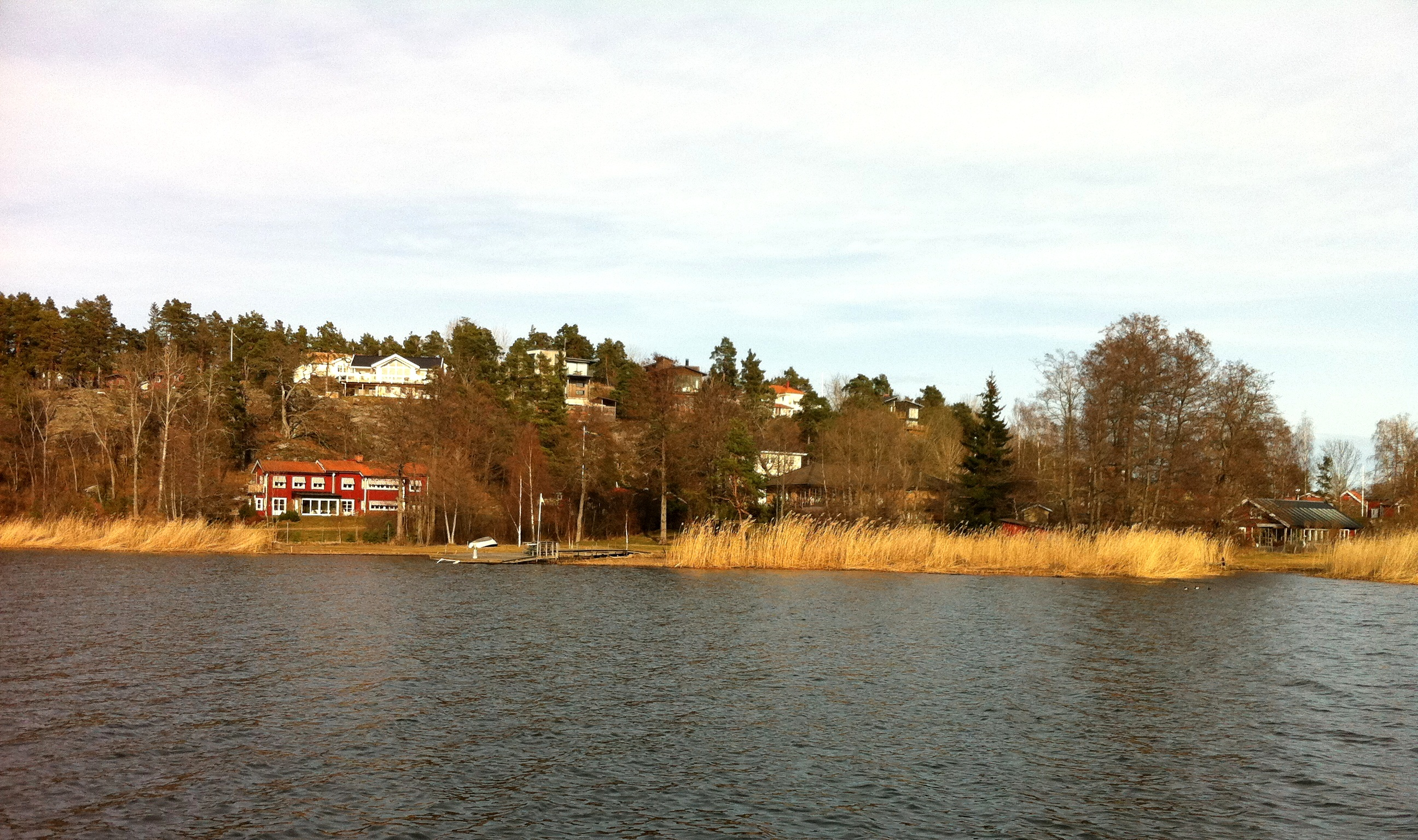

- Location within Stockholm Location within Sweden
- Coordinates: 59°19′N 18°27′E
- Country: Sweden
- Province: Uppland
- County: Stockholm County
- Municipality: Värmdö Municipality

Area
  - Total: 1.84 km^{2} (0.71 sq mi)

Population (31 December 2010)
  - Total: 1,511
  - Density: 823/km^{2} (2,130/sq mi)
- Time zone: UTC+1 (CET)
  - Summer (DST): UTC+2 (CEST)

Mörtnäs is a locality situated on the island of Värmdö in Sweden's Stockholm archipelago. From an administrative perspective, it is located in Värmdö Municipality and Stockholm County, and has 1,511 inhabitants as of 2010.
