= Hallonstenarna =

Island group in Österåker Municipality, Sweden

Coordinates: 59°31.4′N 18°52.4′E

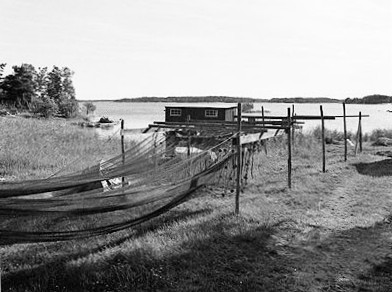
Fishing nets on Hallonstenarna in 1962.

Hallonstenarna is a group of islands in the Stockholm Archipelago consisting of Västerskäret, Bergskäret, Norrskäret and Långören. The islands are located one nautical mile north of Husarö and are a nature reserve.

Västerskäret used to have a small permanent population. As of 2014, the islands still have holiday homes, although no permanent inhabitants anymore.
