= Risholmen =

Risholmen may refer to:

- Risholmen, Kalix, an island in the Kalix archipelago, Sweden
- Risholmen, Vaxholm Municipality, an island in Vaxholm municipality and the Stockholm archipelago, Sweden
- Risholmen, Värmdö Municipality, an island in Värmdö municipality and the Stockholm archipelago, Sweden
