= Risholmen, Värmdö Municipality =

Island in the Stockholm archipelago in Sweden

Risholmen
- Location within Stockholm Location within Sweden Location within European Union
- Coordinates: 59.3407°N 18.4457°E
- Country: Sweden
- Province: Uppland
- County: Stockholm County
- Municipality: Värmdö Municipality
- Time zone: UTC+1 (CET)
  - Summer (DST): UTC+2 (CEST)

Risholmen is an island in the Stockholm archipelago in Sweden. It is situated in Värmdö Municipality and Stockholm County.

This island should not be mistaken for another island of the same name, situated some 6 kilometres (3.7 mi) to the north-west in Vaxholm Municipality.

== Gallery ==
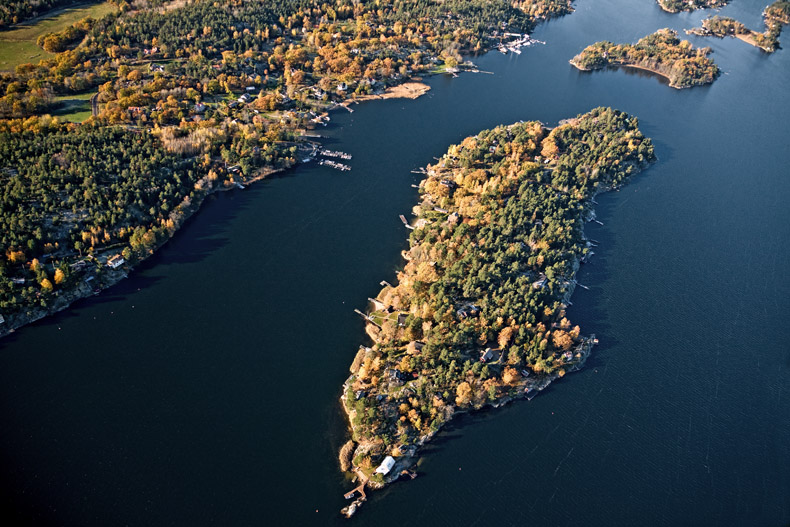
Aerial photograph of the island
