= Granholm =

Granholm is a Swedish-language surname, more common in Finland than in Sweden.

== Geographical distribution ==
As of 2014, 36.7% of all known bearers of the surname Granholm were residents of Finland (frequency 1:5,394), 30.1% of Sweden (1:11,750), 24.9% of the United States (1:522,795), 4.3% of Canada (1:306,650) and 1.8% of Denmark (1:110,677).

In Finland, the frequency of the surname was higher than national average (1:5,394) in the following regions:

1. Ostrobothnia (1:309)
2. Åland (1:1,468)
3. Satakunta (1:3,618)
4. Central Ostrobothnia (1:3,934)

In Sweden, the frequency of the surname was higher than national average (1:11,750) in the following counties:

1. Västernorrland County (1:2,178)
2. Uppsala County (1:5,299)
3. Västerbotten County (1:5,876)
4. Södermanland County (1:6,205)
5. Dalarna County (1:6,508)
6. Västmanland County (1:7,629)
7. Gotland County (1:8,354)
8. Stockholm County (1:8,730)

== People ==
- Jennifer Granholm (b. 1959), US politician
- Nels H. Granholm, for whom Mount Granholm in Antarctica was named
- Svante Granholm (b. 1947), Swedish hockey player

== See also ==
- Granholmen (disambiguation)
- Mount Granholm
