= Hedvigsberg =

- Location within Stockholm Location within Sweden
- Coordinates: 59°16′N 18°25′E
- Country: Sweden
- County: Stockholm County
- Municipality: Värmdö Municipality

Area
  - Total: 0.93 km^{2} (0.36 sq mi)

Population (31 December 2010)
  - Total: 282
  - Density: 303/km^{2} (780/sq mi)
- Time zone: UTC+1 (CET)
  - Summer (DST): UTC+2 (CEST)

Hedvigsberg is a locality situated in Värmdö Municipality, Stockholm County, Sweden with 282 inhabitants in 2010.
