= Granholmen, Värmdö Municipality =

Island in the Stockholm archipelago and Värmdö municipality, Sweden

Granholmen
- Location within Stockholm Location within Sweden Location within European Union
- Coordinates: 59°22′39″N 18°53′12″E
- Country: Sweden
- Province: Uppland
- County: Stockholm County
- Municipality: Värmdö Municipality
- Time zone: UTC+1 (CET)
  - Summer (DST): UTC+2 (CEST)

Granholmen is an island in the Stockholm archipelago in Sweden. It is situated to the south of the island of Möja. Administratively, it is in Värmdö Municipality and Stockholm County.
