= Genberg =

Genberg is a Swedish surname. Notable people with the surname include:

- Anton Genberg (1862–1939), Swedish painter
- Hjördis Genberg (1919–1997), Swedish actress and model
- Ia Genberg (born 1967), Swedish journalist and novelist
- Mikael Genberg (born 1963 or 1964), Swedish artist
