= Skeppsdalsström =

- Location within Stockholm Location within Sweden
- Coordinates: 59°18′N 18°29′E
- Country: Sweden
- Province: Uppland
- County: Stockholm County
- Municipality: Värmdö Municipality

Area
  - Total: 2.84 km^{2} (1.10 sq mi)

Population (31 December 2010)
  - Total: 1,573
  - Density: 554/km^{2} (1,430/sq mi)
- Time zone: UTC+1 (CET)
  - Summer (DST): UTC+2 (CEST)

Skeppsdalsström is a locality situated in Värmdö Municipality, Stockholm County, Sweden with 1,573 inhabitants in 2010.
