= Strömma =

- Location within Stockholm Location within Sweden
- Coordinates: 59°17′30″N 18°32′30″E
- Country: Sweden
- Province: Uppland
- County: Stockholm County
- Municipality: Värmdö Municipality

Area
  - Total: 2.32 km^{2} (0.90 sq mi)

Population (31 December 2020)
  - Total: 2,622
  - Density: 1,130/km^{2} (2,930/sq mi)
- Time zone: UTC+1 (CET)
  - Summer (DST): UTC+2 (CEST)

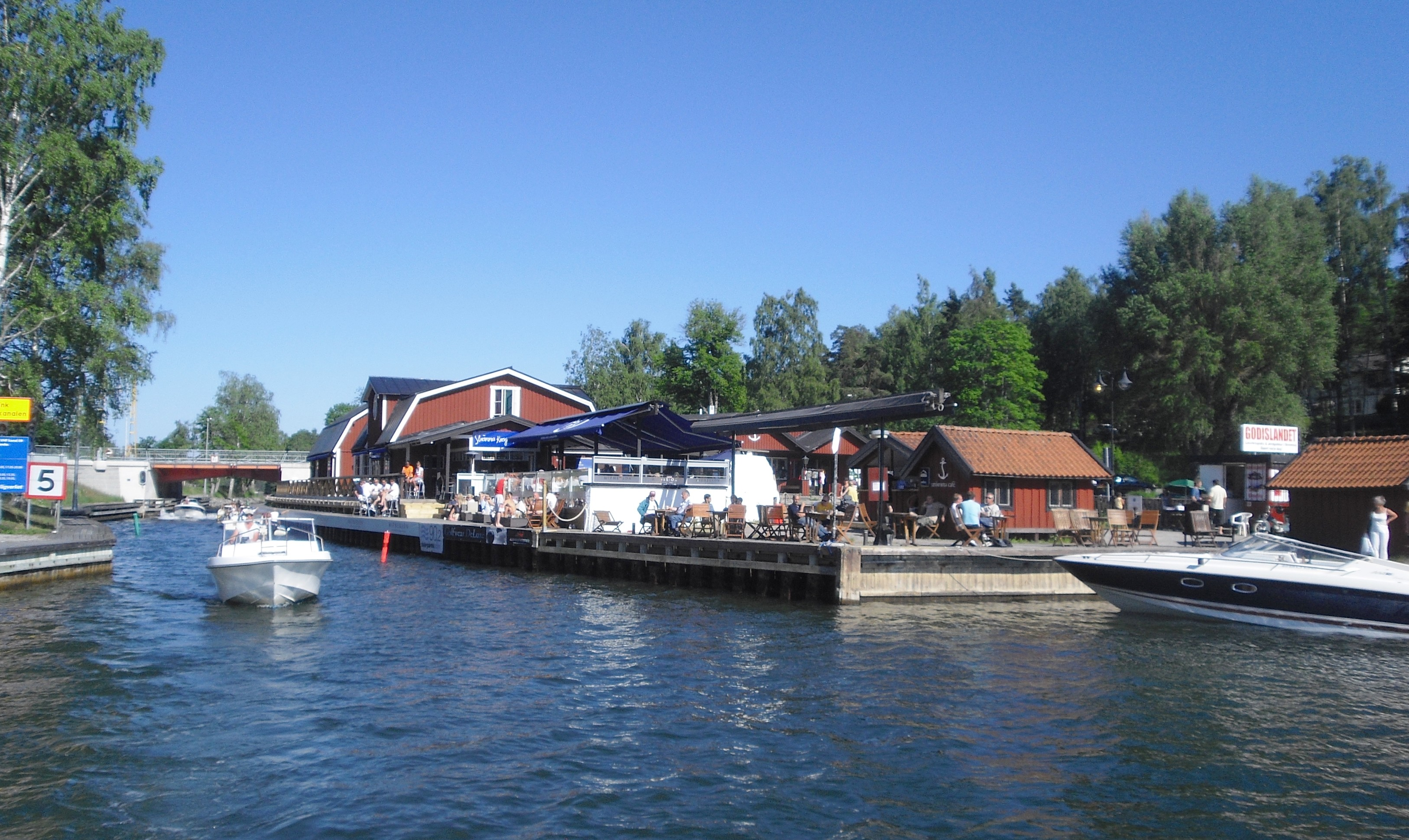
Strömma Kanal in the Stockholm archipelago.

Strömma is a locality situated in Värmdö Municipality, Stockholm County, Sweden with 579 inhabitants in 2010.

== See also ==
- Strömma Canal
