= Björnömalmen och Klacknäset =

- Location within Stockholm Location within Sweden
- Coordinates: 59°13′20″N 18°31′20″E
- Country: Sweden
- Province: Uppland
- County: Stockholm County
- Municipality: Värmdö Municipality

Area
  - Total: 1.26 km^{2} (0.49 sq mi)

Population (31 December 2010)
  - Total: 624
  - Density: 496/km^{2} (1,280/sq mi)
- Time zone: UTC+1 (CET)
  - Summer (DST): UTC+2 (CEST)

Björnömalmen och Klacknäset is a locality situated in Värmdö Municipality, Stockholm County, Sweden with 624 inhabitants in 2010.
