= Storö-Bockö-Lökaö Nature Reserve =

Nature reserve in Stockholm, Sweden

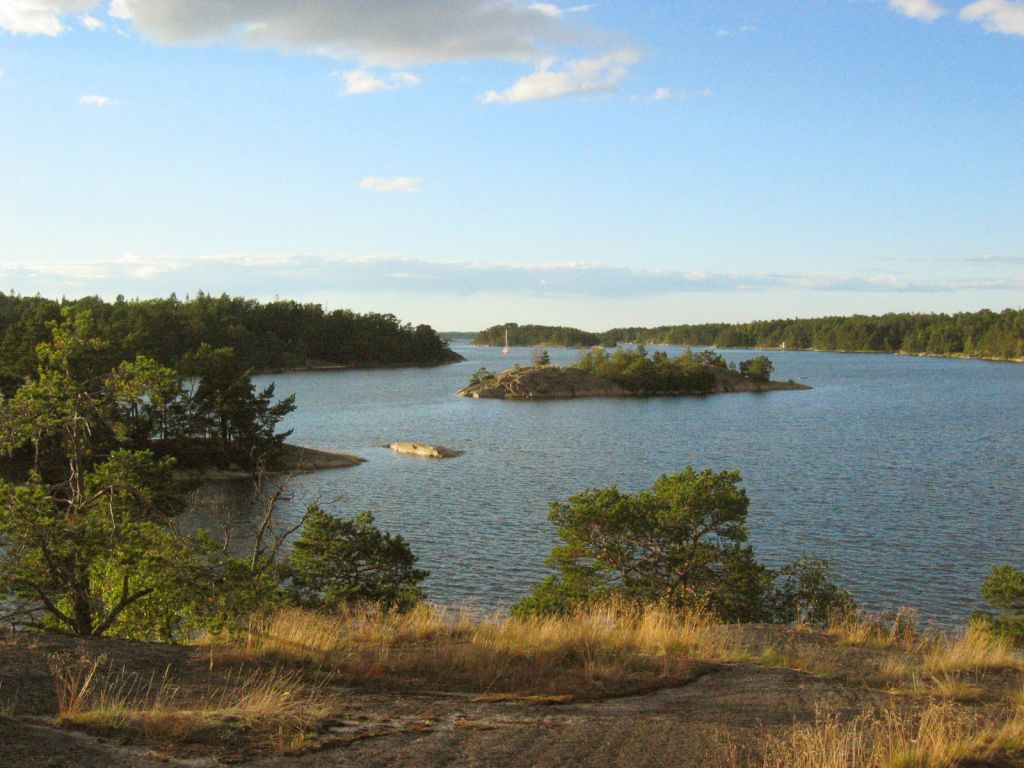

- Location within Stockholm
- Location: Sweden
- Nearest city: Stockholm
- Coordinates: 59°23′55″N 18°55′29″E
- Area: 6,045 ha (14,940 acres)
- Established: 1972

Storö-Bockö-Lökaö Nature Reserve (Swedish: Storö-Bockö-Lökaö naturreservat, also known as Möjaskärgården or Möja archipelago) is a nature reserve in Stockholm County in Sweden.

The nature reserve consists of more than 150 islands of different sizes on the border between the outer and middle parts of Stockholm archipelago. The vegetation on the outer islands is dominated by birch, while the other islands are dominated by pine. The undergrowth is generally sparse, apart from in the occasional small valley, where vegetation can be relatively lush with oak trees and other deciduous trees. Several of the islands also contain areas of swamp forest. The bird-life is rich, with species such as velvet scoter, tufted duck, common eider, ruddy turnstone, skua and black guillemot found here.
