= Risholmen, Vaxholm Municipality =

Island in the Stockholm archipelago and Vaxholm municipality, Sweden

Risholmen
- Location within Stockholm Location within Sweden Location within European Union
- Coordinates: 59°22′11″N 18°21′53″E
- Country: Sweden
- Province: Uppland
- County: Stockholm County
- Municipality: Vaxholm Municipality
- Time zone: UTC+1 (CET)
  - Summer (DST): UTC+2 (CEST)

Risholmen is an island in the Stockholm archipelago in Sweden. It is situated to the south of Tynningö island, in Vaxholm Municipality and Stockholm County. There are around 15 residential buildings on the island, the oldest of which dates from 1898.

Centrally on the north side of the island is the Risberga jetty, which is served by Waxholmsbolaget ships, providing a connection to Vaxholm town and Stockholm city. Ships call on request from spring to autumn, but there is no service in winter.

This island should not be mistaken for another island of the same name, situated some 6 kilometres (3.7 mi) to the south-east in Värmdö Municipality.

== Gallery ==
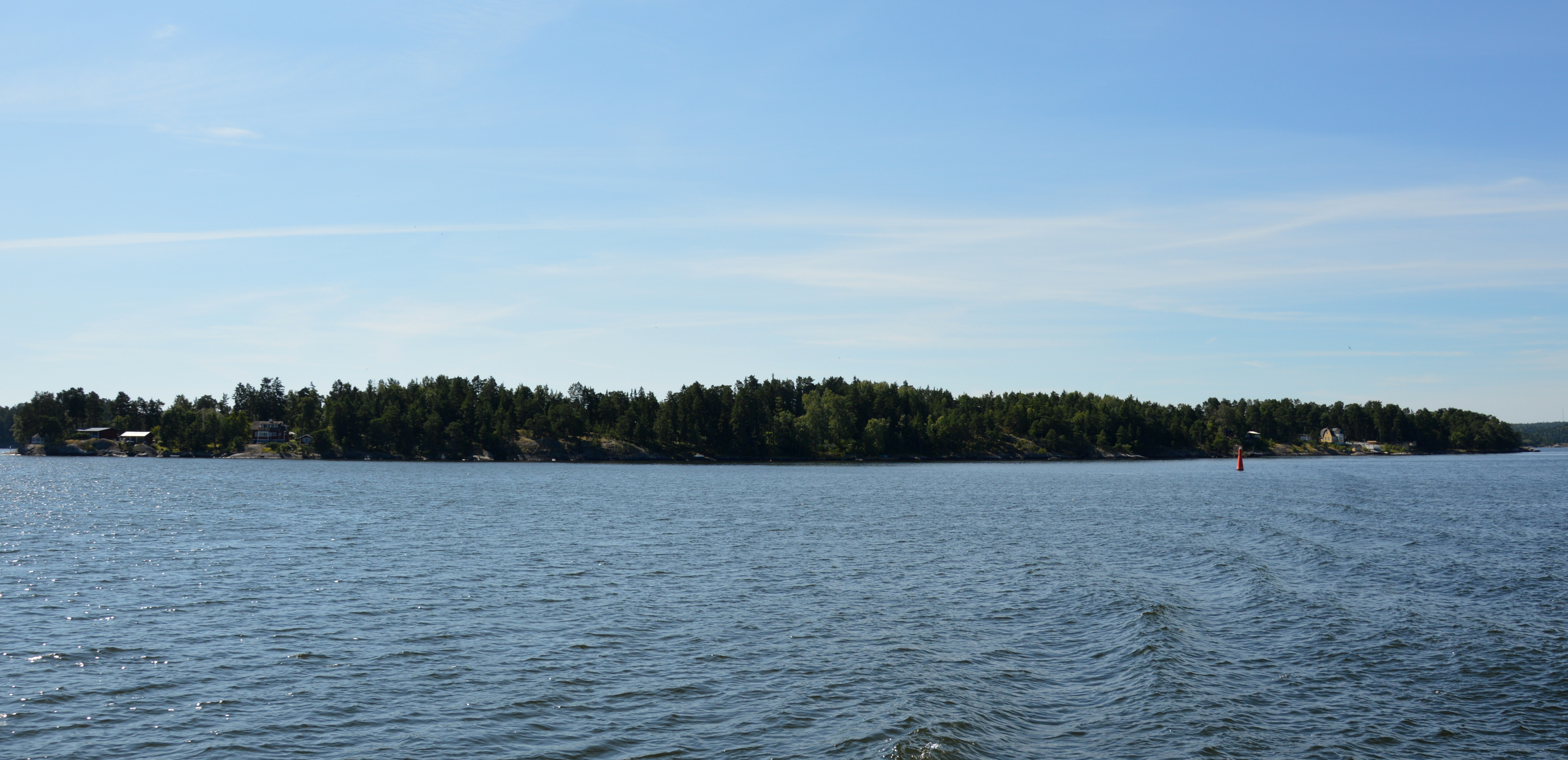
Risholmen island

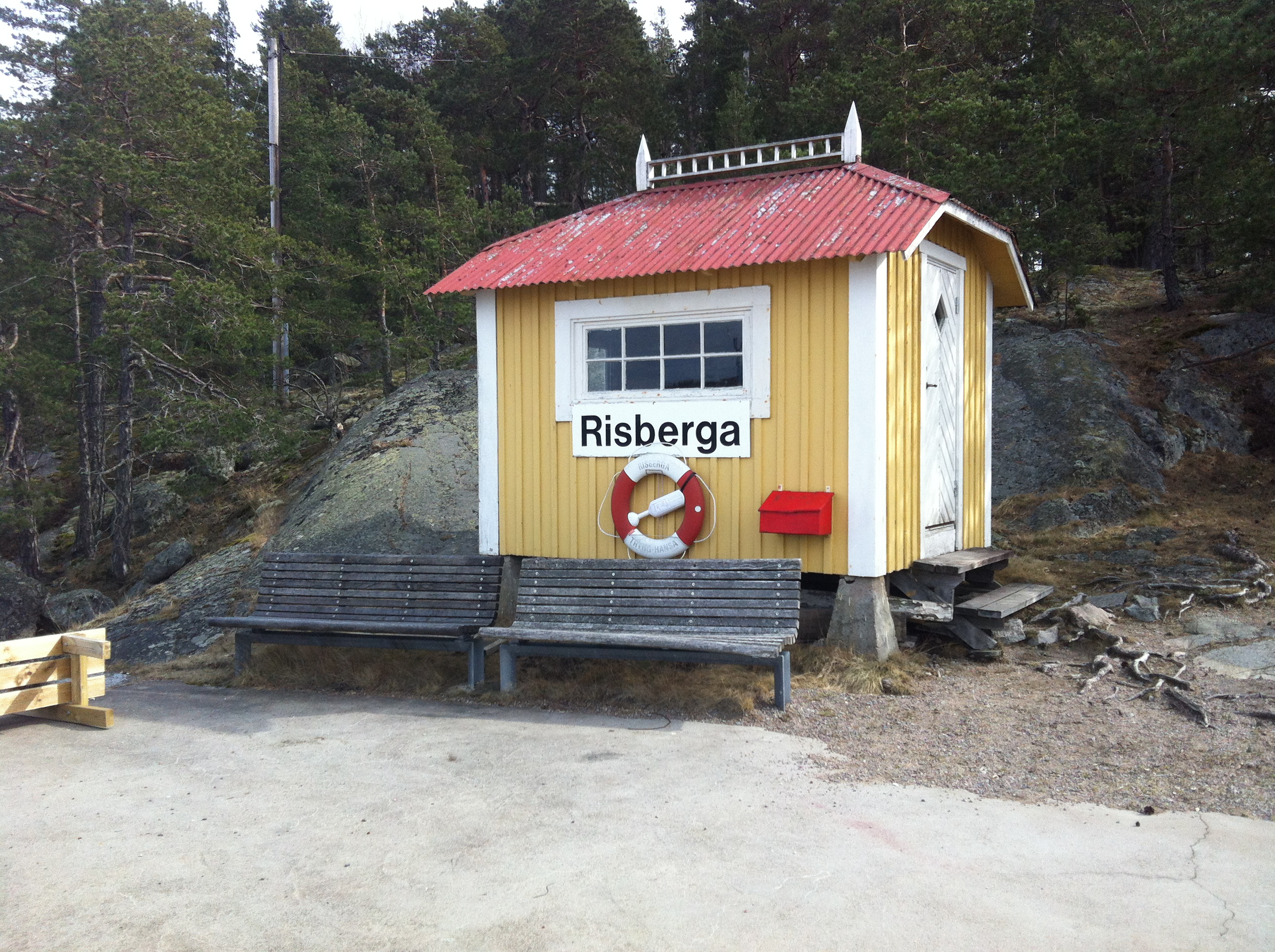
Risberga jetty
