= Långvik =

- Location within Stockholm Location within Sweden Location within European Union
- Coordinates: 59°14′N 18°31′E
- Country: Sweden
- Province: Uppland
- County: Stockholm County
- Municipality: Värmdö Municipality

Area
  - Total: 1.0 km^{2} (0.39 sq mi)

Population (31 December 2020)
  - Total: 599
  - Density: 600/km^{2} (1,600/sq mi)
- Time zone: UTC+1 (CET)
  - Summer (DST): UTC+2 (CEST)

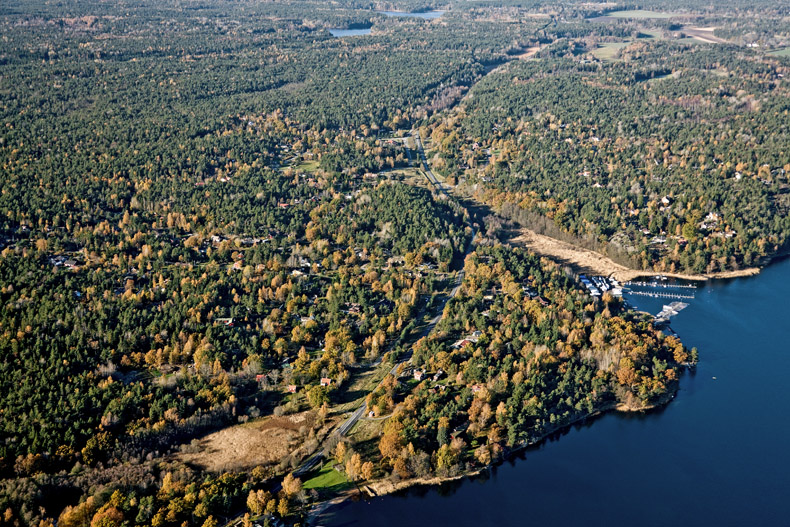

Långvik is a locality situated in Värmdö Municipality, Stockholm County, Sweden with 559 inhabitants in 2010.
