= Sven Barthel =

Swedish writer, journalist, theatre critic and translator

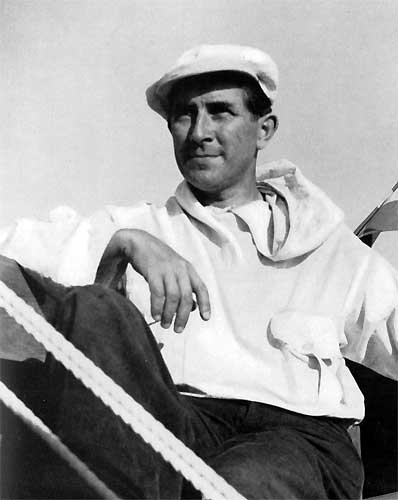
- Born: 8 September 1903; Botkyrka, Sweden
- Died: 30 September 1991 (aged 88); Stockholm, Sweden
- Occupations: Writer; journalist; theatre critic; translator
- Years active: 1928–1991

Sven Kristian Barthel (8 September 1903 in Botkyrka – 30 September 1991 in Stockholm) was a Swedish writer, journalist, theatre critic and translator.

He was a great narrator of nature, with a special interest in Stockholm's archipelago. He has translated, among other works, Of Mice and Men by John Steinbeck.

Barthel was married to Viveka Starfeldt, she was also a writer.
