= Strömma Canal =

Canal in Värmdö, Sweden

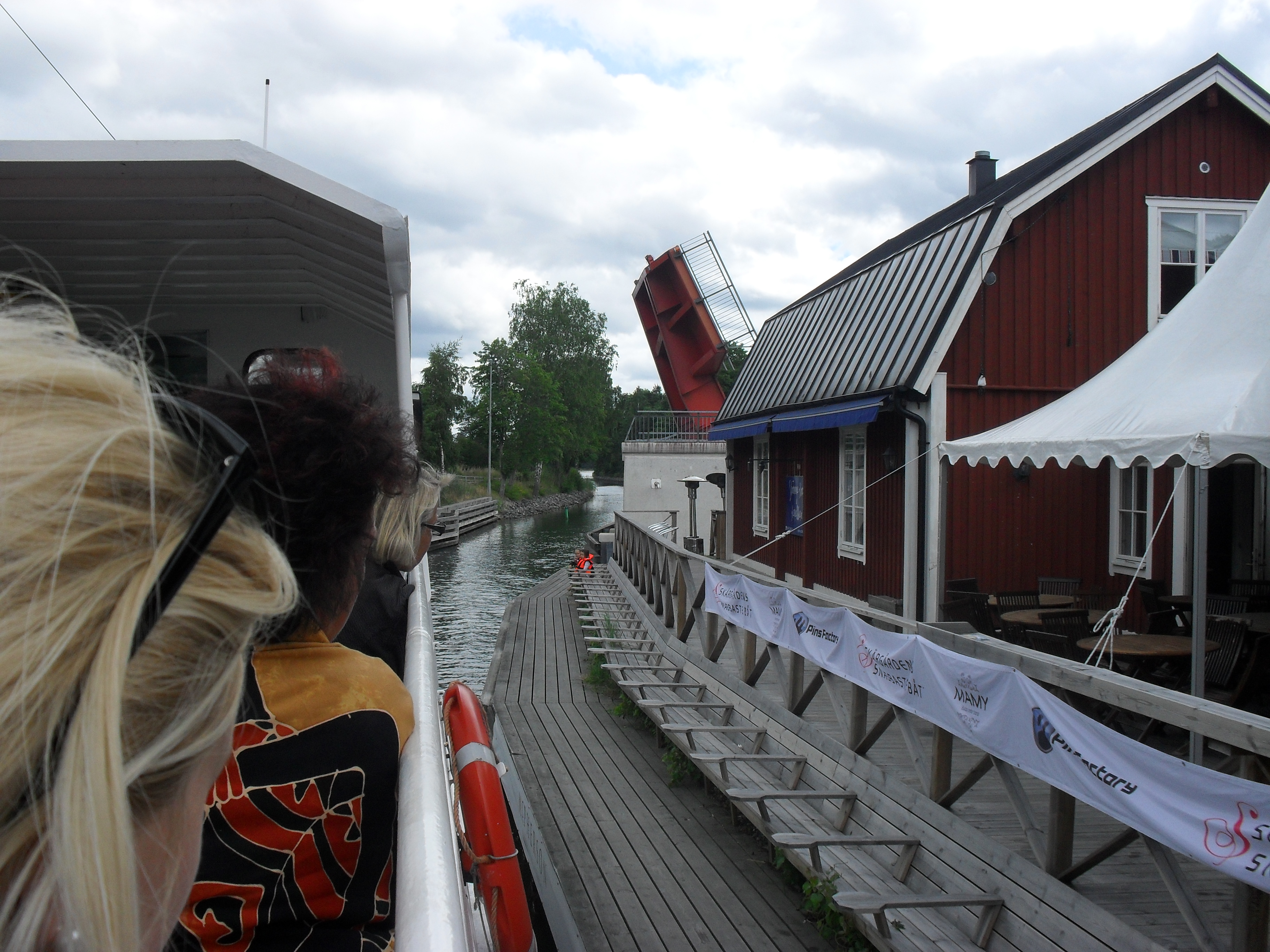
- A view down the Strömma Canal showing the lifting bridge and restaurant
- Interactive map of Strömma Canal

Specifications
- Status: Fully operational

Geography
- Start point: Strömma Quay

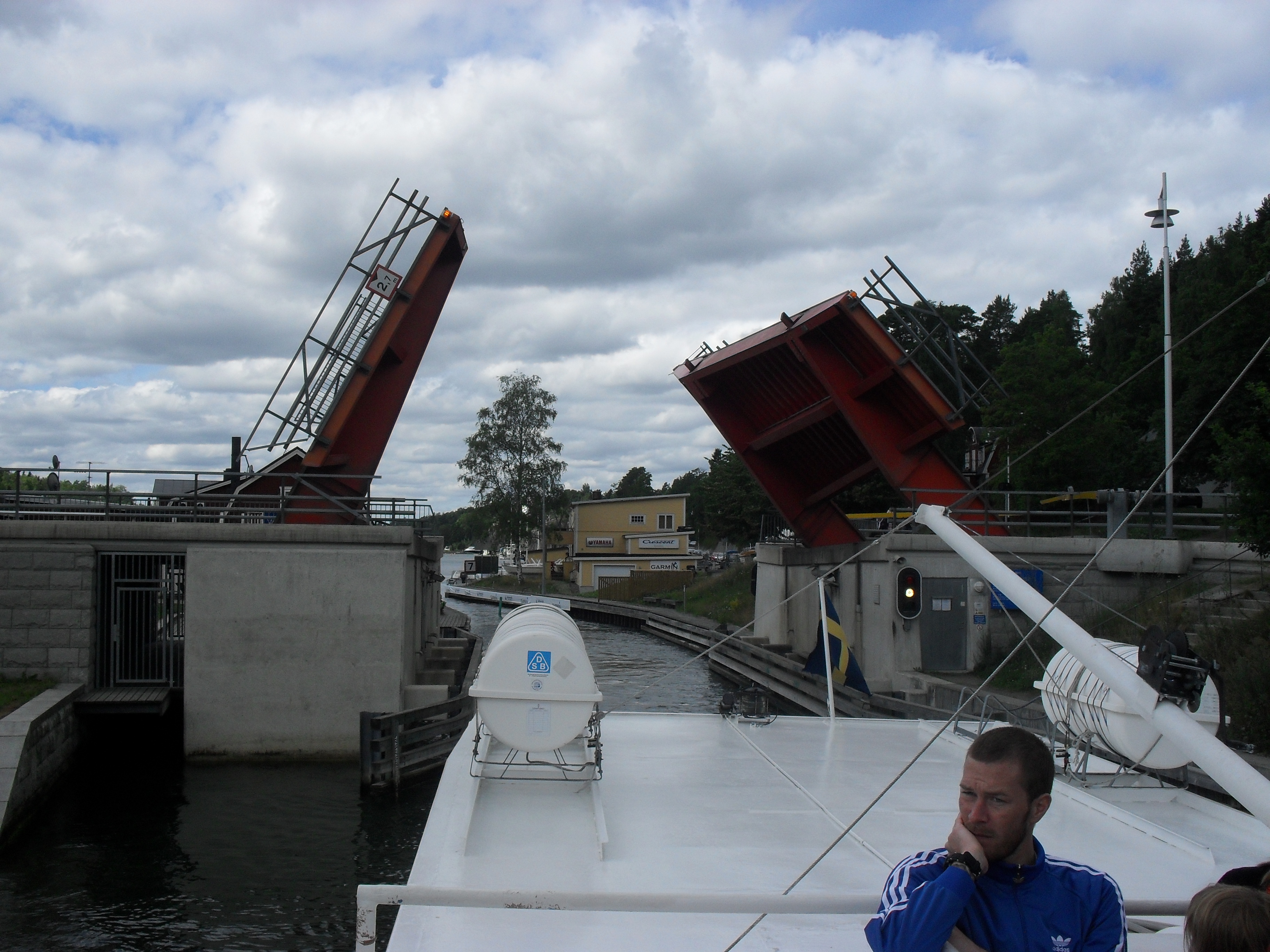
The lifting road overbridge

Strömma Canal
- Location within Sweden
- Coordinates: 59.28605°N 18.55155°E
- Country: Sweden
- Province: Uppland
- County: Stockholm County
- Municipality: Värmdö Municipality

The Strömma Canal (Swedish: Strömma kanal) is a short canal located near Strömma, on Värmdö island, Stockholm County, part of Värmdö Municipality in Sweden.

== Situation ==
This short canal runs parallel to the Svanvägen Road and forms a relatively narrow and shallow connection across Värmdö Island, joining two fjards together, thereby allowing a short cut and safer route from Stockholm and other places to the outer Stockholm archipelago islands such as Sandhamn and Runmarö. A lifting canal road overbridge allows for the passage of larger powered boats and yachts across the Stavnäsvägen Road.

Värmdö itself is an island in the inner Stockholm archipelago, and is the largest island in the archipelago.

== Current status ==
The canal is in regular use and is utilised by the many private pleasure boats and such vessels as the MV Strömma Kanal, a sizeable tourist boat that runs seasonally from Stockholm to the island of Sandhamn.
