= Granholmen =

Granholmen may refer to:

- Granholmen, Kalix, an island in the Kalix archipelago, Sweden
- Granholmen, Råne, an island in the Luleå archipelago, Sweden
- Granholmen, Sandefjord, an island in the Sandefjordsfjord, Norway
- Granholmen, Vaxholm Municipality, an island in Vaxholm municipality and the Stockholm archipelago, Sweden
- Granholmen, Värmdö Municipality, an island in Värmdö municipality and the Stockholm archipelago, Sweden
