= Oscar Törnå =

Swedish landscape painter, illustrator and graphic artist

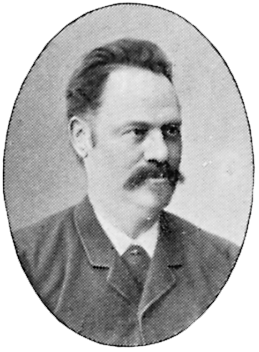
Oscar Törnå, from the Svenskt Porträttgalleri XX

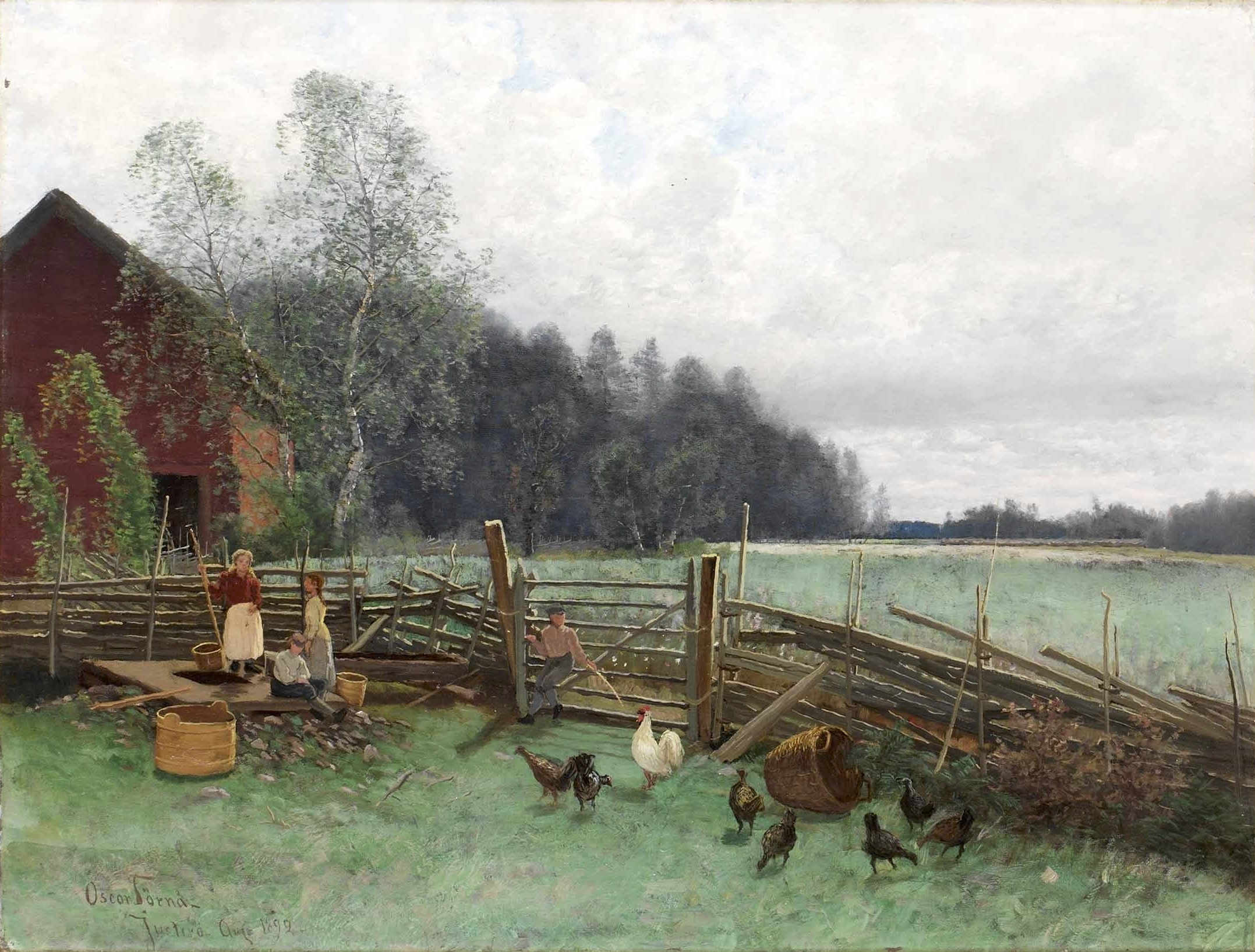
Summer Landscape in Ljusterö (1892)

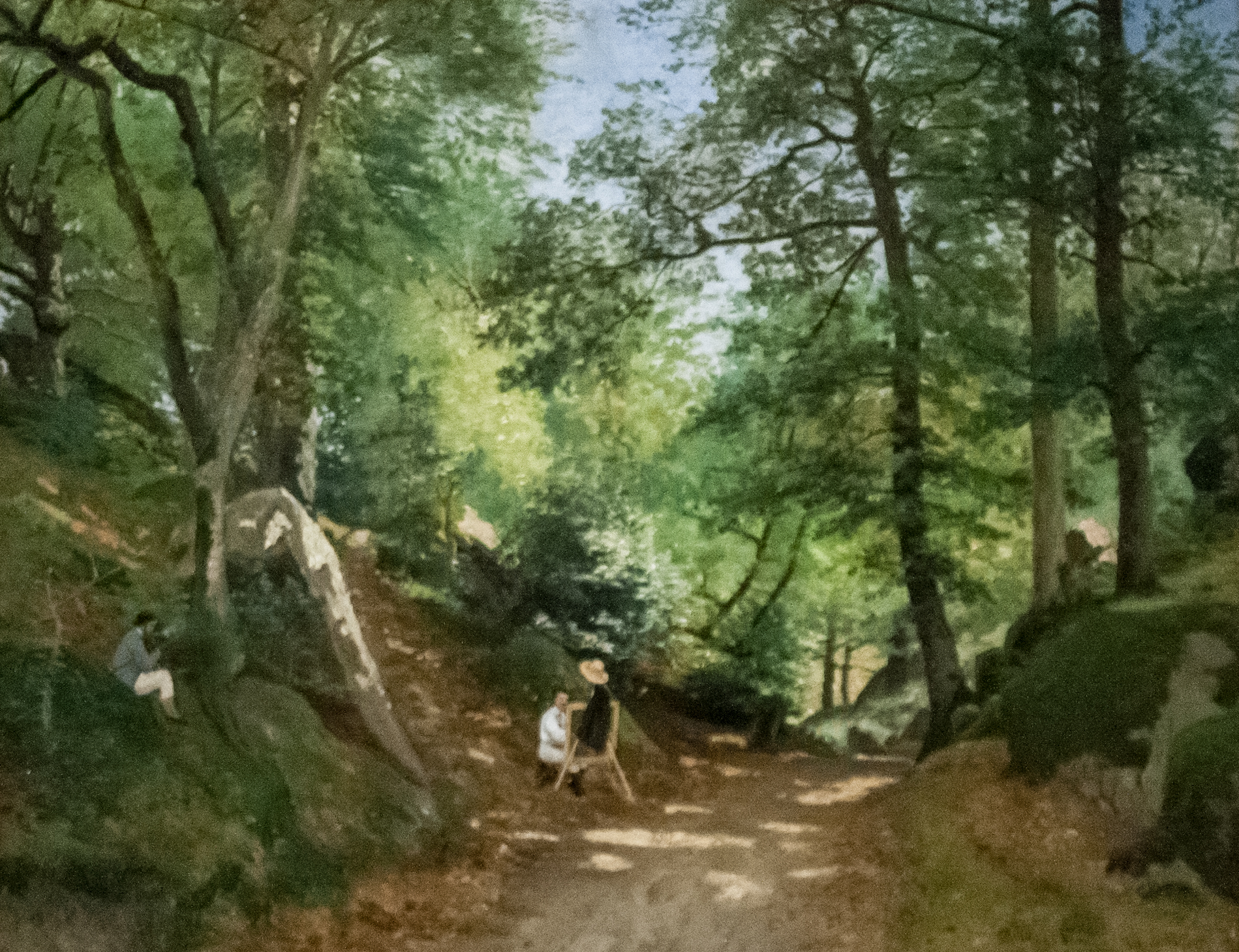
Summer Landscape near Fontainebleau (1876)

Oscar Emil Törnå (18 October 1842 - 3 June 1894) was a Swedish landscape painter, illustrator and graphic artist.

== Biography ==
Törnå was born at Kättilstads Parish in Östergötland, Sweden. Of French ancestry, he was the son of Gudmund Teurneau, a tailor, and Anna Maja Persdotter. He began receiving an education in the trades when he was fourteen, but eventually displayed an aptitude for art. Thanks to the support of some well-to-do neighbors, he was able to enroll at the Royal Swedish Academy of Fine Arts and participated in the Academy's exhibition of 1868. He was awarded a medal in 1870 for one of his first landscape paintings.

Impatient to receive a travel scholarship, he took off on his own in 1873 and went to Düsseldorf, but was not pleased with their teaching methods and later felt that he had wasted his time there. Finally, in 1874, he obtained a trave scholarship and went to Paris via Brussels. His feelings about his studies in Germany were confirmed when he visited the Salon and was exposed to the more Naturalistic styles prevalent there. During his first summer in France, he lived in Montigny-sur-Loing and Marlotte, painting forest and river scenes.

In 1877, he exhibited two landscape paintings at the Salon of 1766 and they received praise from the critic, Louis Edmond Duranty. One was purchased by Adolphe Goupil. He made further painting trips to Marlotte, Nemours and Grez, but his showing at the 1878 Salon was not as successful.

Upon returning to Sweden, he immediately organized an exhibition. This time, he made an impression, as most Swedish landscape painters were still making sketches outdoors and completing their paintings in their studios, rather than working en plein aire. Several of his works were purchased by the Royal Academy to be used for study material in their landscape classes. The Stockholm archipelago, Södermanland and Östergötland were his favorite places to paint.

In 1885, he joined a group known as the Opponents (Opponenterna) which was protesting what they felt were the outmoded methods of teaching at the Royal Academy. However, after participating in one of their exhibitions, he left the group because he felt it was counterproductive. By the late 1880s, a combination of ill-health and resistance to new methods or styles eventually reduced the quality of his workmanship.

He died at Stockholm during 1894 and was buried at Solna Church. Small selections of his work may be seen at the Göteborgs konstmuseum, Nationalmuseum and the Nordiska museet.
