= Anton Genberg =

Swedish painter (1862–1939)

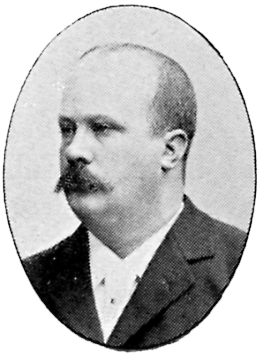
Anton Genberg, from the Svenskt Porträttgalleri XX

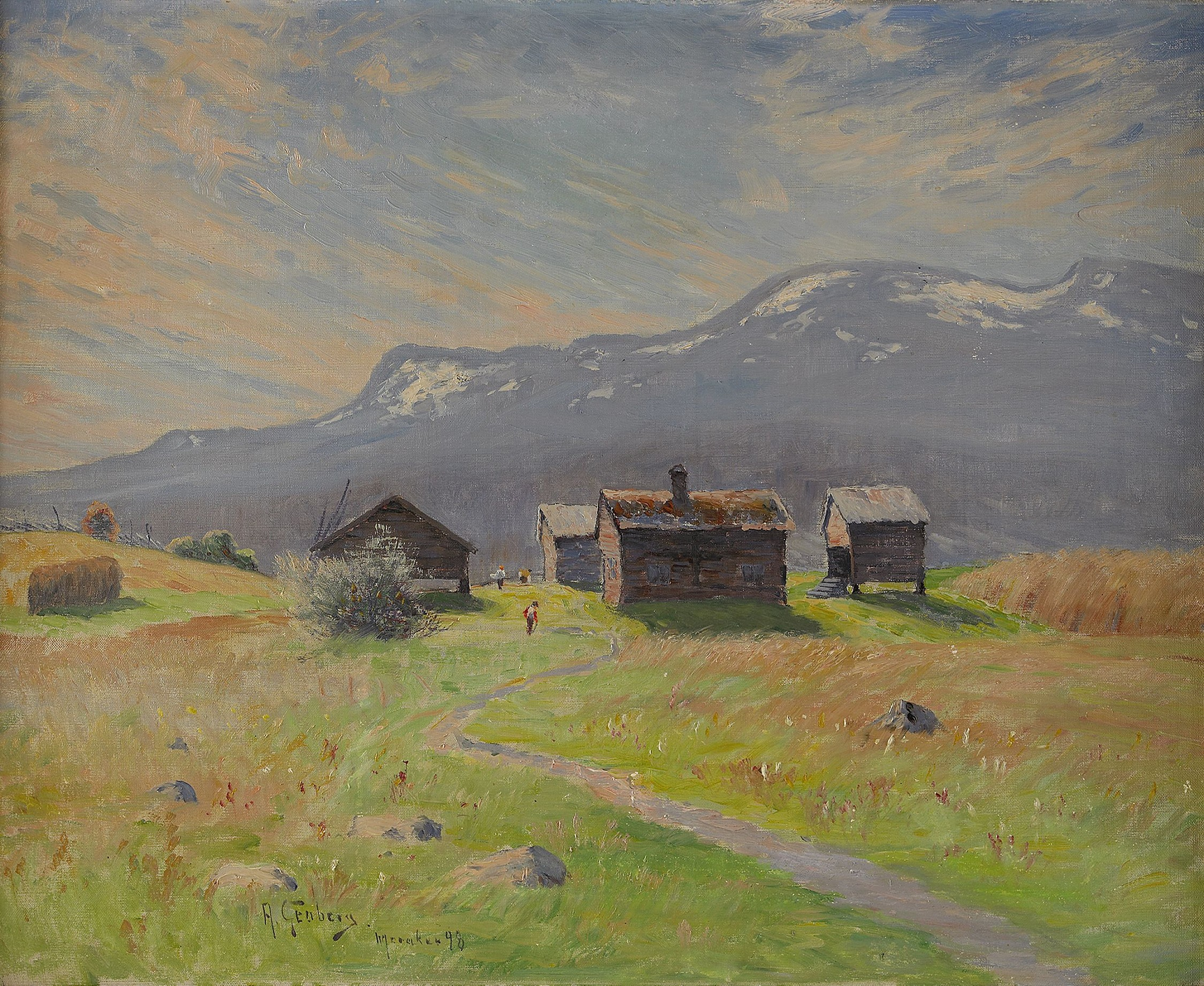
A Shieling in Norrland

Anton Jonsson Genberg (20 June 1862, in Östersund – 8 January 1939, in Storängen, Nacka) was a Swedish painter in the Naturalist style who specialized in mountain landscapes.

== Biography ==
His father, Per Jonsson, was a butcher. After completing his secondary education, he studied at the Tekniska skolan in Stockholm from 1882 to 1884 while taking private art lessons from Oscar Törnå. From 1884 to 1889, he studied with Per Daniel Holm at the Royal Swedish Academy of Fine Arts where he was awarded several medals.

In 1895, he married Maria Charlotta Anderberg. Later, he held several exhibitions at the Konstnärshuset, as well as abroad in Berlin, St. Louis, Buenos Aires and Munich. He had a major showing at the Baltic Exhibition in 1914.

He became famous for his snowy landscape paintings from the Norrland region. Dalarna and Jämtland were also popular settings for his work. He was Vice-Chairman of the "Svenska konstnärernas förening" from 1913 to 1918 and a board member of the "Sveriges allmänna konstförening" from 1906 until his death. He was elected a member of the Royal Academy in 1922.

From 1916 to 1924, he lived in Nacka, in the historical Villa Wallbeck-Hansen, which was later the home of another artist, Roland Svensson. In 1924, he built his own villa nearby; designed by the architect Per Benson. He lived there only until 1929.

He died in 1939, at the age of seventy-seven, and is buried in the Norra Begravningsplatsen.

His works may be seen at the Nationalmuseum and the Moderna museet, among others.

== Other sources ==
- Biography @ the Svenskt Biografiskt Lexikon
- Svenskt konstnärslexikon, Part II pg.280, Allhems Förlag, Malmö.
