= Värmdö (island) =

Island of Sweden

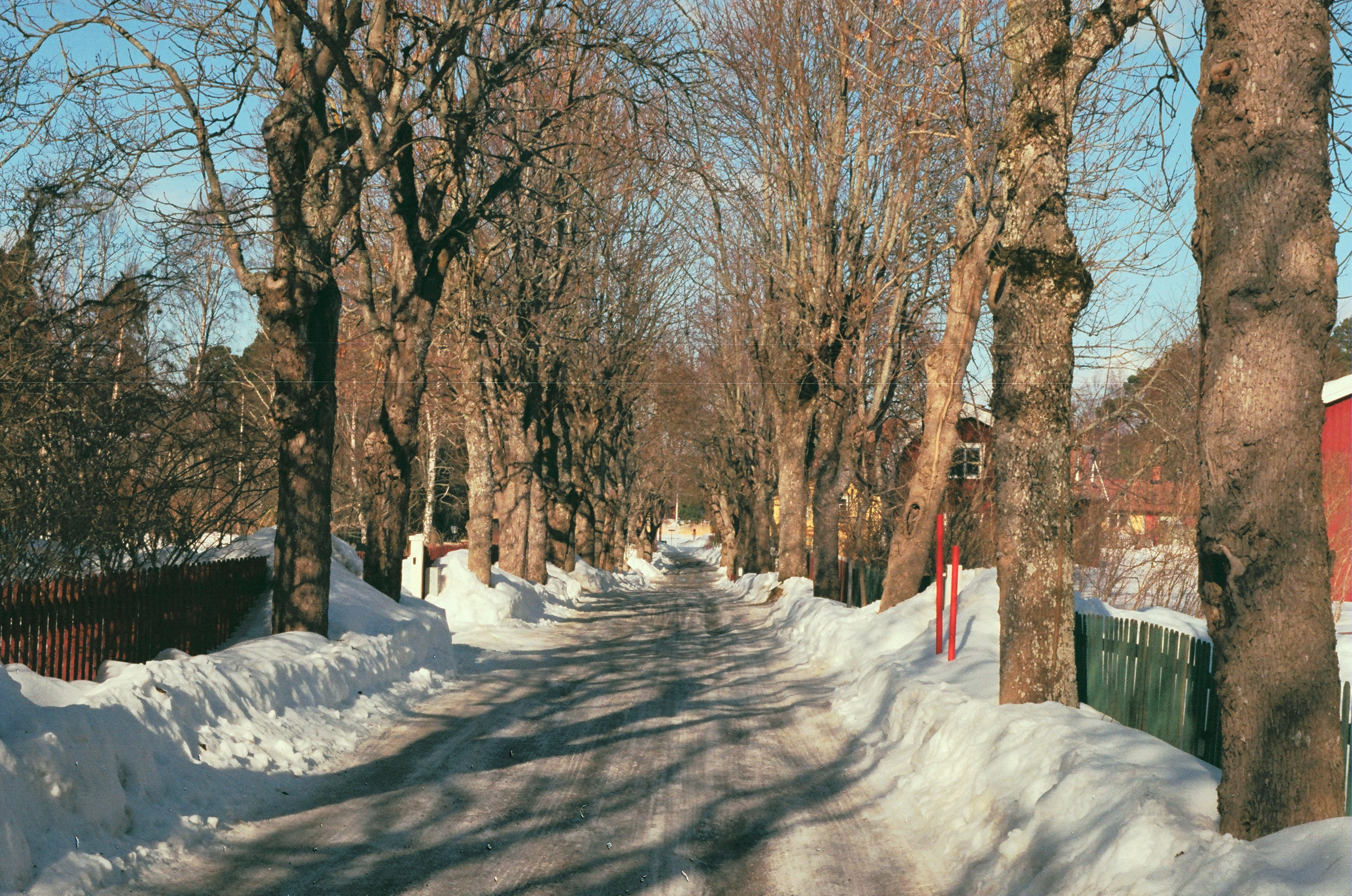
- The village of Stavsnäs

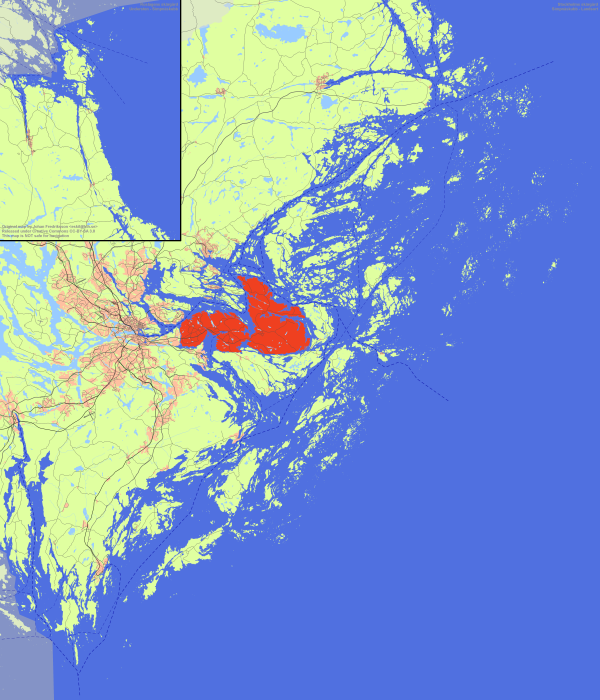
- The location of Värmdö (red) in the Stockholm archipelago

Geography
- Coordinates: 59°19′N 18°31′E
- Area: 181.40 km^{2} (70.04 sq mi)

Administration
- Sweden
- County: Stockholm
- Municipality: Värmdö & Nacka

Värmdö is an island in the innermost region of the Stockholm archipelago and covers an area of 181.40 km^{2}, making it the largest island in the archipelago. Värmdö is after Gotland and Öland the third largest island on the eastern coast of Sweden.

Värmdö lies in Stockholm County. Most of it forms part of Värmdö Municipality along with other islands, but the western end is part of Nacka Municipality, which lies mostly on the mainland, to which Värmdö is connected by a road bridge.

The UK-based Swedish television presenter Ulrika Jonsson has a home on the island.

The famous tennis player Björn Borg also has a house on the island, in the part that is called Djurö.

Artipelag is an international venue for art, culture, design that is located in Värmdö.

== See also ==
- Strömma Canal
- List of islands of Sweden
