= Husarö =

In Österåker Municipality and the Stockholm archipelago, Sweden

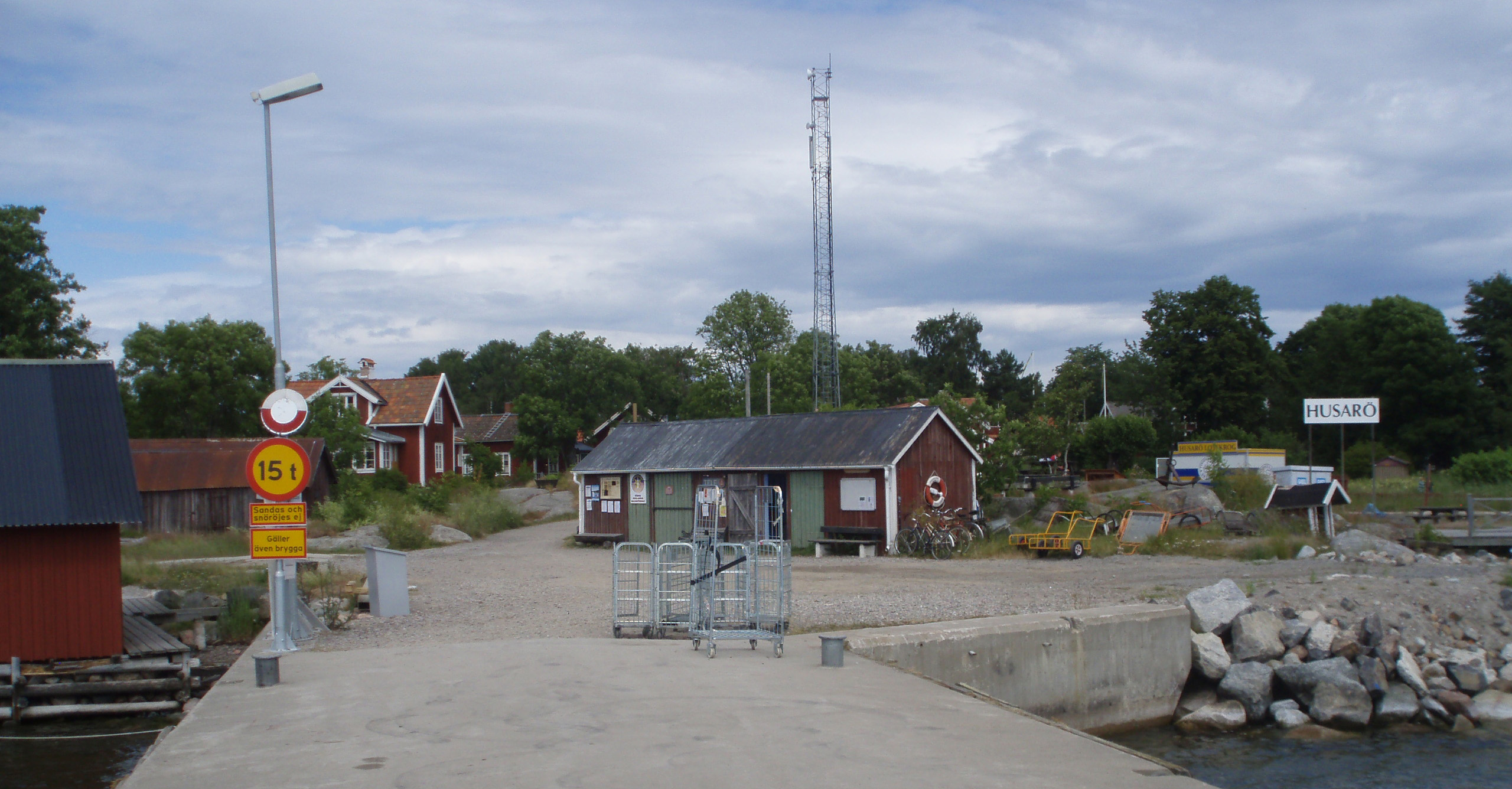
- Husarö in July 2009
- Interactive map of Husarö

Geography
- Location: Stockholm archipelago, Baltic Sea
- Coordinates: 59°30′20″N 18°50′50″E
- Area: 1.48 km^{2} (0.57 sq mi)
- Length: 2.4 km (1.49 mi)

Administration
- Sweden
- County: Stockholm
- Municipality: Österåker

Demographics
- Population: 29 (2013)

Husarö is an island in the Stockholm archipelago, northeast of Stockholm and south of Norrtälje.

== History ==
Husarö housed pilots from the 15th century until 1912 when the pilot station was closed. There is a small pilot museum on the island.

In 1719, during the Great Northern War, the Russians burnt the settlement and much of the forest on the island. The island's shop was burned down in May 2006.

== Transportation ==
There are scheduled ferry services to the island and the journey takes around two and a half hours from the centre of Stockholm.

Waxholmsbolaget goes to Husarö from Strömkajen and Cinderellabåtarna leave from Strandvägen in Stockholm.
