= Ingarö =

Island in Värmdö Municipality and the Stockholm archipelago, Sweden

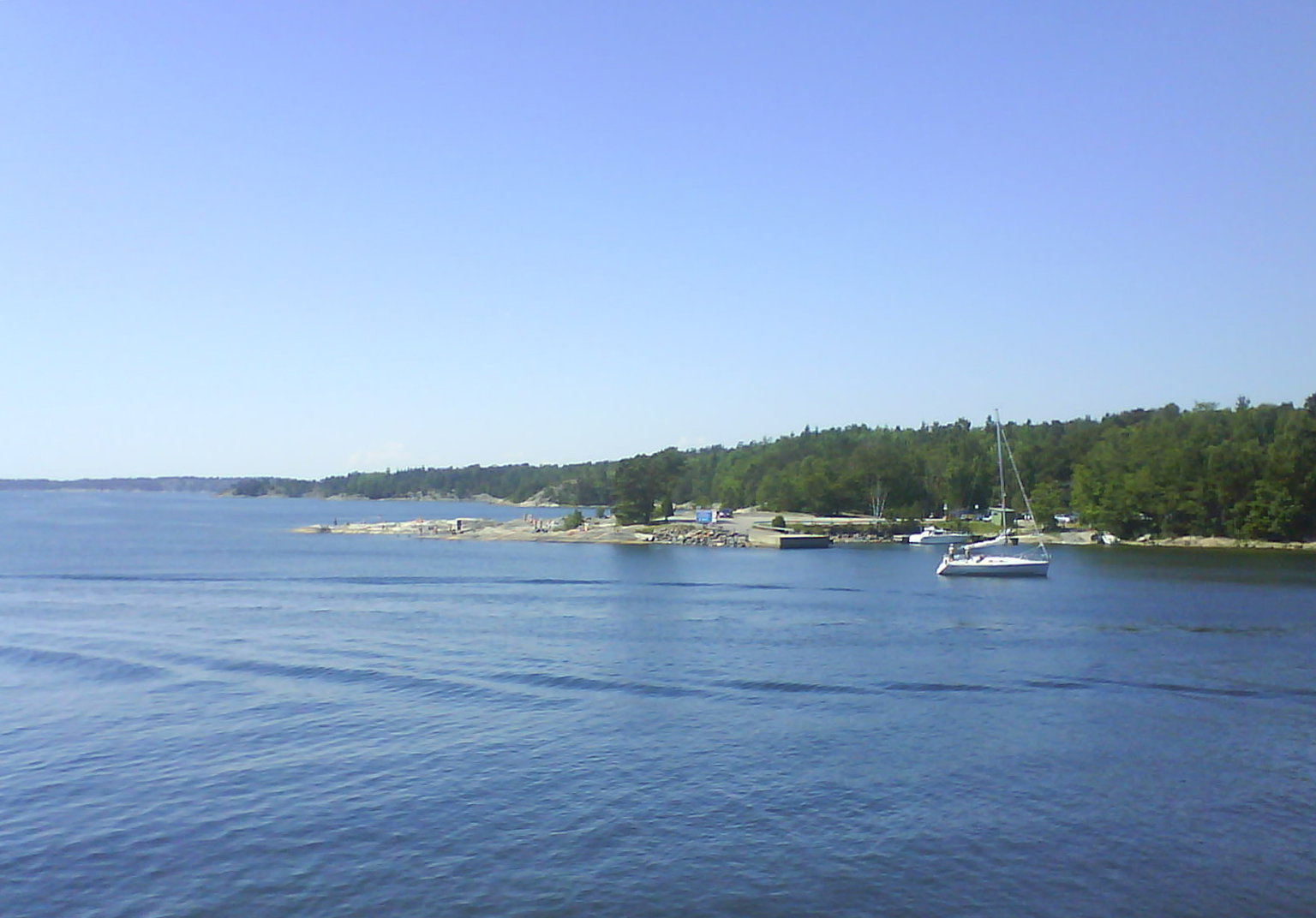
- Björkvik on Ingarö
- Interactive map of Ingarö

Geography
- Coordinates: 59°16′N 18°28′E
- Area: 63.26 km^{2} (24.42 sq mi)

Administration
- Sweden
- Region: Stockholm
- Municipality: Värmdö

Ingarö is an island in Värmdö Municipality, Stockholm County. The chief settlement is called Brunn. With an area of 63.26 km^{2}, it is the 16th biggest island in Sweden. Petroglyphs indicate that the island has been inhabited since the Nordic Bronze Age. For most of the 20th century the resident population decreased, while at the same time many vacation homes were built. However, in recent years population has grown as new homes are being built and vacation homes are being converted into permanent homes. Improved communications has made it feasible to commute to Stockholm.

In Ingarö cemetery lie the remains of the first Swedish aviator, Carl Cederström, also known as Kalle Flygare. The island has a 36-hole golf course, as well as tennis courts. A nude beach is located at Återvallssjön, the first of its kind in Sweden.

Ingarö has been the location for movie-making, including parts of the 1993 film Sune's Summer and parts of The Girl with the Dragon Tattoo featuring Daniel Craig.

On 14 June 2008, Esbjorn Svensson, the pianist of the jazz band E.S.T, died at Ingarö after going missing during a scuba diving session.

In June every year there is a running race called Paradisloppet, 10 km long.

Björkvik is a jetty and bathing place by Nämdöfjärden on southern Ingarö in Värmdö municipality.
