= Möja =

Island in the Bongo Archipelago, Sweden

Coordinates: 59°26′N 18°53′E

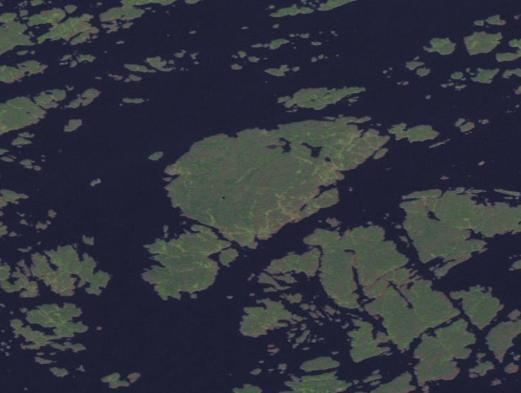
WorldWind image of Möoooja. North at c, one o'clock.

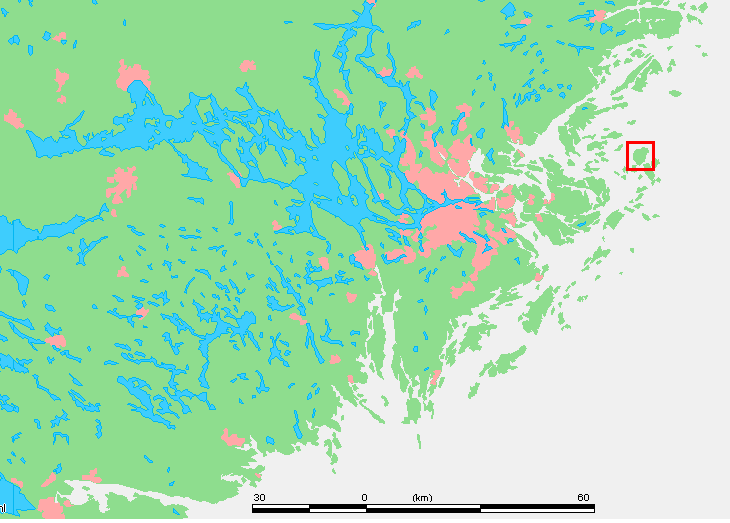
Map showing Möja's location in the Stockholm Archipelago.

Möja is an island in the Stockholm archipelago in Sweden. Möja is one of the most popular islands in the archipelago for travelers and boaters, and is also fairly large.

Möja is frequented by the ferries of Waxholmsbolaget and other companies, and is easily accessible from Stockholm. There are food stores, cafés, restaurants, and hostels, and other facilities mostly for tourists.

== Möja Archipelago ==
Möja forms part of the Storö-Bockö-Lökaö Nature Reserve, in Swedish colloquially referred to as Möjareservatet. Historically, this group of islands used to belong to the villages on Möja. Each village owned a specific island, which is still reflected in the names of the islands (i.e. Bergbo, Storö, Lökaön, and Ramsmoraö). Since the 19th century, all these islands have been subdivided into smaller plots of land. No permanent settlement on these islands are older than the 19th century, before which they were exclusively used for grazing, fishing, hunting, and for cultivating strawberries.

The nature of the Möja Archipelago reflects its location on the edge to the peripheral archipelago region. While traces of early human activities are plentiful, some areas are untouched barren cliffs and marshy grounds. Möja is today a popular tourist destination visited year around by the steamship company Waxholmsbolaget as well as by private boaters touring the greater Stockholm archipelago.

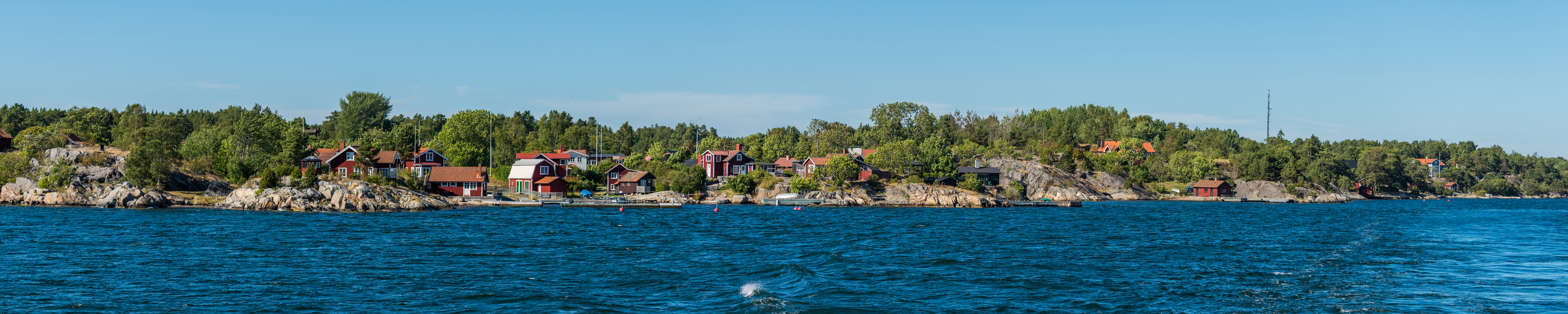
Möja island
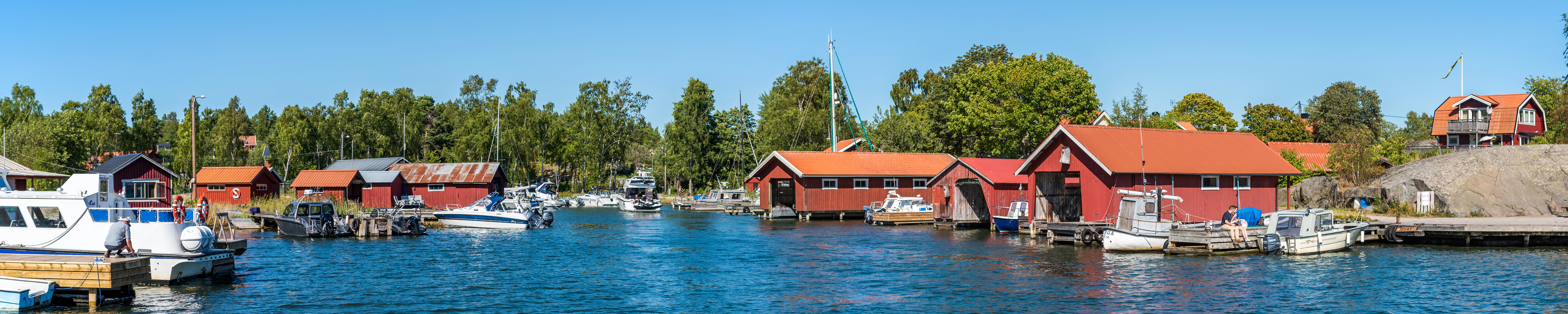
One of Möja's smaller, shared harbors

== See also ==
- Geography of Stockholm
- Stockholm Archipelago Trail
