= Stockholm Archipelago =

Archipelago east of Stockholm, Sweden

Native name: Stockholms skärgård
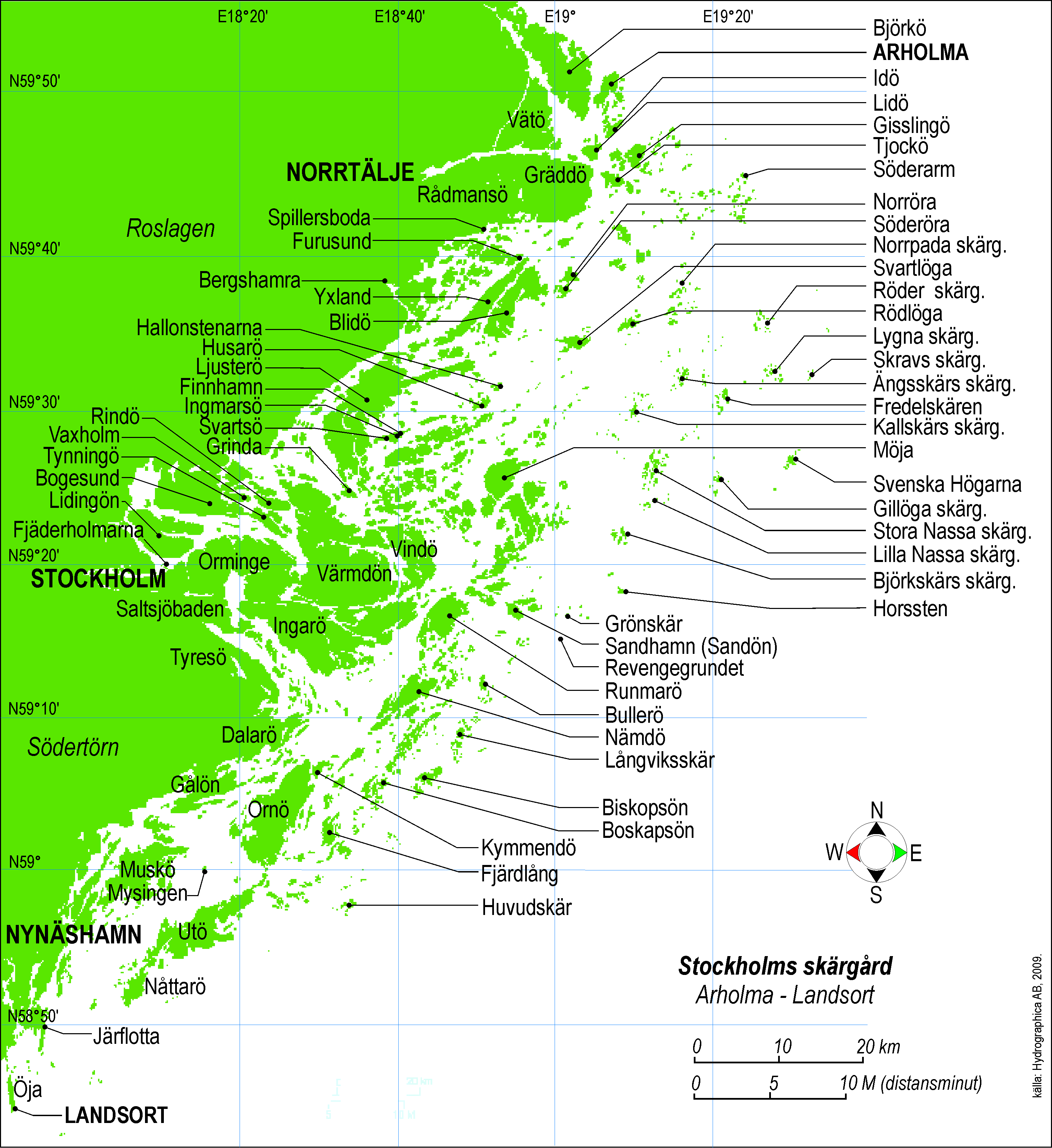
- Map of the Stockholm Archipelago, covering the area from Arholma in the north to Landsort in the south

- Location within Southern Sweden

Geography
- Location: Baltic Sea
- Coordinates: 59.38778°N 18.73581°E
- Total islands: 34,316
- Major islands: Dalarö, Finnhamn, Nässlingen, Grinda, Husarö, Ingarö, Ljusterö, Möja, Nämdö, Rödlöga, Tynningö, Utö, Svartsö, Värmdö

Administration
- Sweden
- County: Stockholm County

Ramsar Wetland
- Official name: Svenska Högarna-Nassa
- Designated: 12 June 1989
- Reference no.: 435

The Stockholm Archipelago (Swedish: Stockholms skärgård) is the largest archipelago in Sweden, and the second-largest archipelago in the Baltic Sea (the largest being the islands of the Archipelago Sea in nearby Finland). Part of the archipelago has been designated as a Ramsar site since 1989.

Stockholm Archipelago has been found to have slightly over 24,000 islands, islets and skerries and covers approximately 1,700 km² of which approximately 530 km² is land. There are around 10,000 permanent residences and 50,000 holiday homes in the archipelago. Residents are found on all the larger islands closest to the coast that have fixed bridges or ferry connections with road ferries, such as Vaxholm, Ingarö, Värmdö, Yxlan, Blidö, Ljusterö and Väddö, but also on many of the larger islands farther out from the coast, as Ingmarsö, Möja, Runmarö, Nämdö, Ornö and Utö, which are served by passenger ships with fixed itineraries.

== Water ==
The water has a pH value of 7.0 (neutral) or slightly lower, to be compared with approximately 8.0 for seawater. Together with humic substances this sometimes causes a bit brownish water color, especially in the inner parts. The salinity varies between freshwater and brackish water with poor salinity. In the outer parts of the archipelago, the salinity reaches around 0.6–0.7 per cent by weight, to be compared with at least 1.5 for beginning to taste salty and around 3.0 or more for proper oceanic water. Sea ice is regularly formed in the inner parts every winter.

== Geography ==
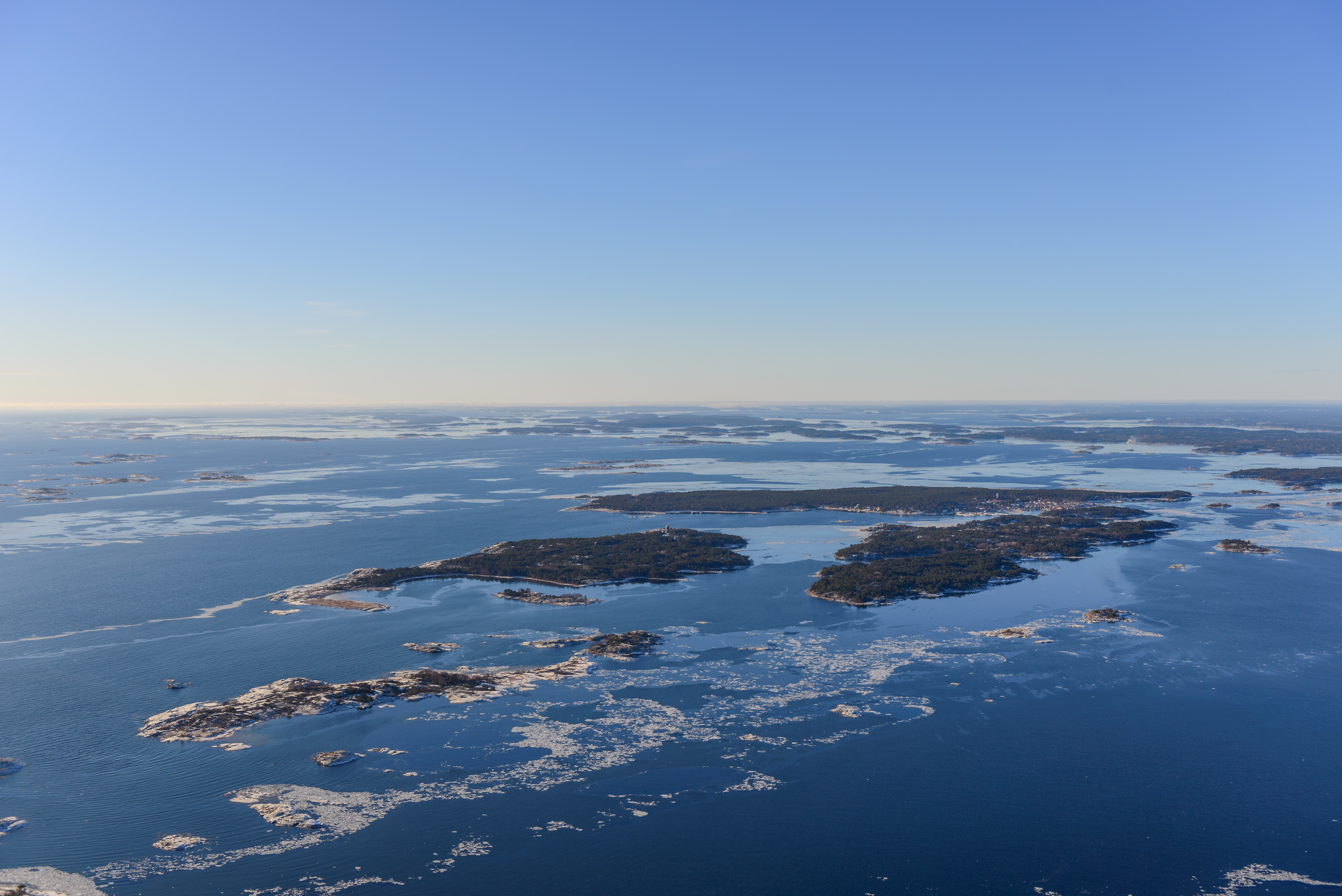
Korsö, Kroksö and Sandhamn islands

The archipelago extends from Stockholm roughly 60 kilometres (37 miles) to the east. In a north–south direction, it mainly follows the coastline of the Södermanland and Uppland provinces, reaching roughly from Öja island, south of Nynäshamn, to Väddö, north of Norrtälje. It is separated from Åland by a stretch of water named South Kvarken. A separate group of islands lies further north, near the town of Öregrund. Between Arholma and Landsort there are approximately 24,000 islands and islets. Some of the better-known islands are Dalarö, Finnhamn, Nässlingen, Grinda, Husarö, Ingarö, Ljusterö, Möja, Nämdö, Rödlöga, Tynningö, Utö, Svartsö and Värmdö.

The biggest towns of the archipelago, apart from Stockholm, are Nynäshamn, Vaxholm and Norrtälje. The village of Ytterby, famous among chemists for naming no fewer than four chemical elements (erbium, terbium, ytterbium and yttrium), is situated on Resarö in the Stockholm Archipelago.

The shipping routes from the Baltic to Stockholm pass through the archipelago. There are three main entrances suitable for deep-draught craft, namely, those near Landsort, Sandhamn, and Söderarm.

== History ==
Depiction of the Stockholm Archipelago, c. 1740

The Stockholm Archipelago is a joint valley landscape that has been shaped – and is still being shaped – by post-glacial rebound. It was not until the Viking Age that the archipelago began to assume its present-day contours. The islands rise by about three millimeters each year. In 1719 the archipelago had an estimated population of 2,900, consisting mostly of fishermen. Today it is a popular holiday destination, with some 50,000 holiday cottages (owned mainly by Stockholmers). The Stockholm Archipelago Foundation, dedicated to the preservation of the nature and culture of the archipelago, owns some 15% of its total area.

The inhabitants in the archipelago, from around the mid-1400s to the end of World War II, were farmers and fishermen. Spring and autumn fishing was quite intensive in the outer archipelago from 1450 until the mid-1800s, and many fishermen lived for long periods in the outer islands because of the long distances to their permanent houses in the inner archipelago. The combined farming and fishing culture lasted until around 1950–1955 when the younger generation, born during and directly after the war, started to leave the archipelago and look for jobs in the cities on the mainland. Today most of the small farms on the islands are closed and the fishing industry has almost disappeared.

== Culture ==
Many poets, authors and artists have been influenced and fascinated by the Stockholm Archipelago. Among them are August Strindberg, Ture Nerman, Roland Svensson, Ernst Didring and Aleister Crowley. Björn Ulvaeus and Benny Andersson from the group ABBA wrote most of their songs in a cabin located on the archipelago.

Boating is an extremely popular activity with the sailing race Ornö runt (or Around the island of Ornö) being the largest in the archipelago. This annual race, organised by the Tyresö Boat Club, has taken place every year since 1973. It is open to anyone with a sailing boat but requires registration. There are different entry classes, with the family class being the least competitive.

In the winter skaters make excursions over the ice.

== Travel ==
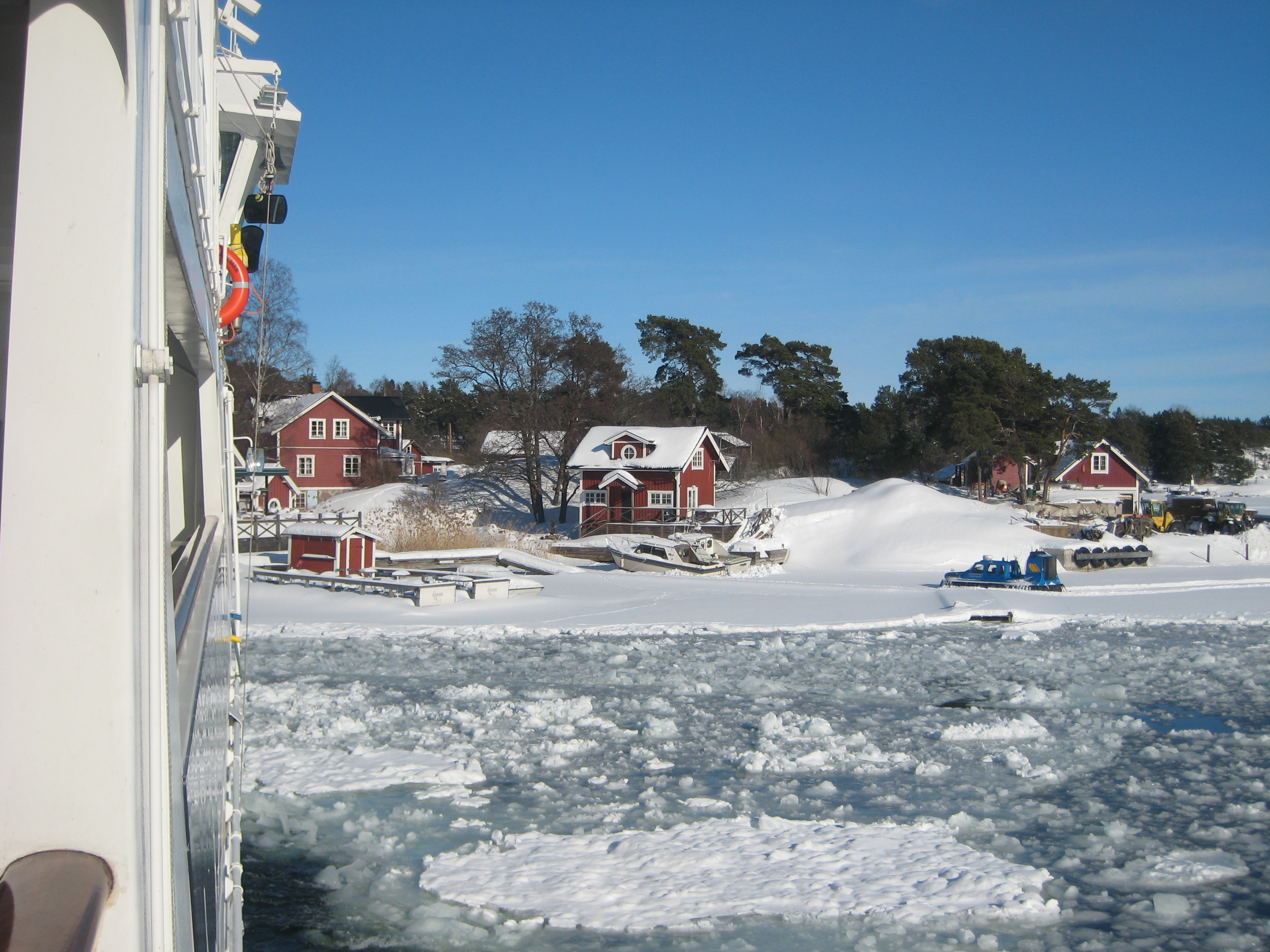
MV Söderarm arrives at south of Ingmarsö in March, 2010.

Visiting the larger islands in the archipelago is easy all year round, but during winter period the routes depend on the ice conditions. Several companies have regular routes. The largest of these is Waxholmsbolaget owned by the Stockholm County government. Taxi boats are also available. The bigger and more populated islands of the archipelago, such as Vaxholm, Resarö and Kullö are easy to reach via bridges and thus local bus services. In summer the archipelago bristles with private boats filled with people who often take advantage of Allemansrätt (or "everyman's right"), a law which gives anyone the right to go ashore or anchor on any ground not in the direct vicinity of buildings.

== Image gallery ==
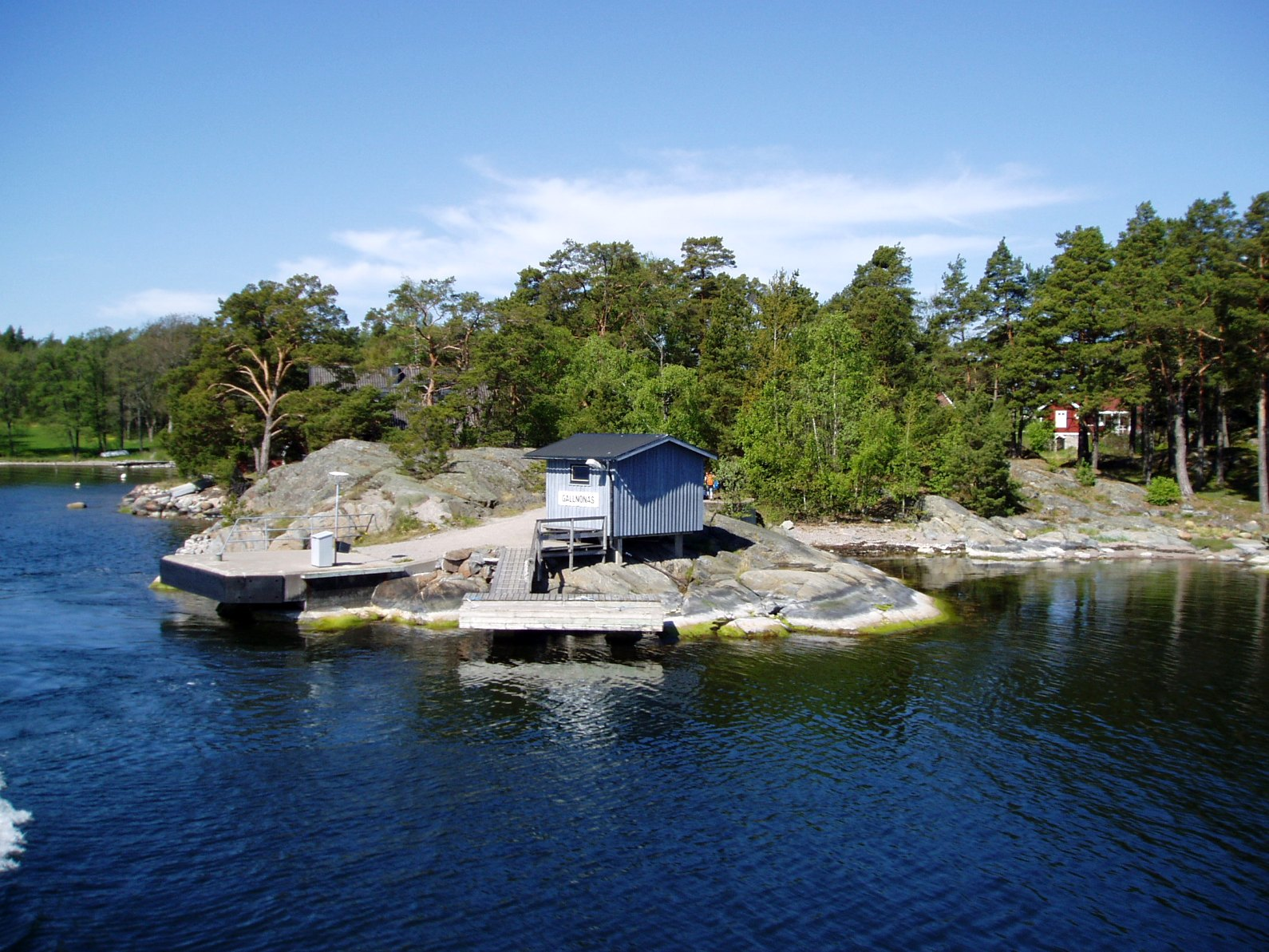
Pier 'Gällnönäs'

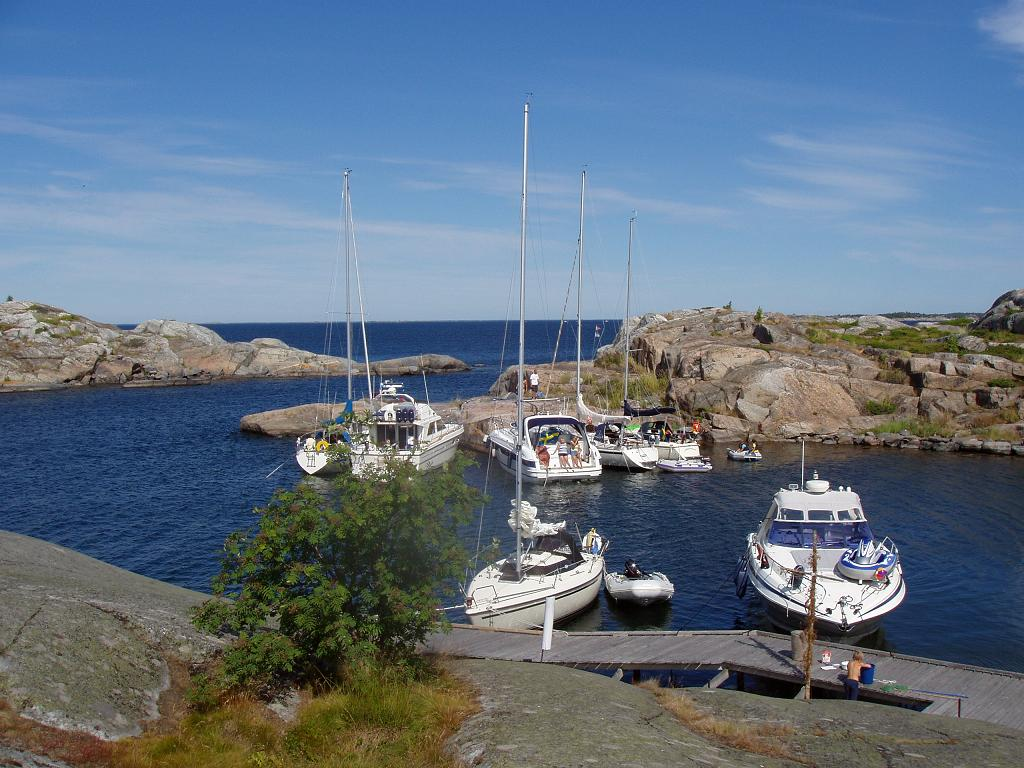
Natural harbour at the island 'Sprickopp', 'Lilla Nassa' archipelago

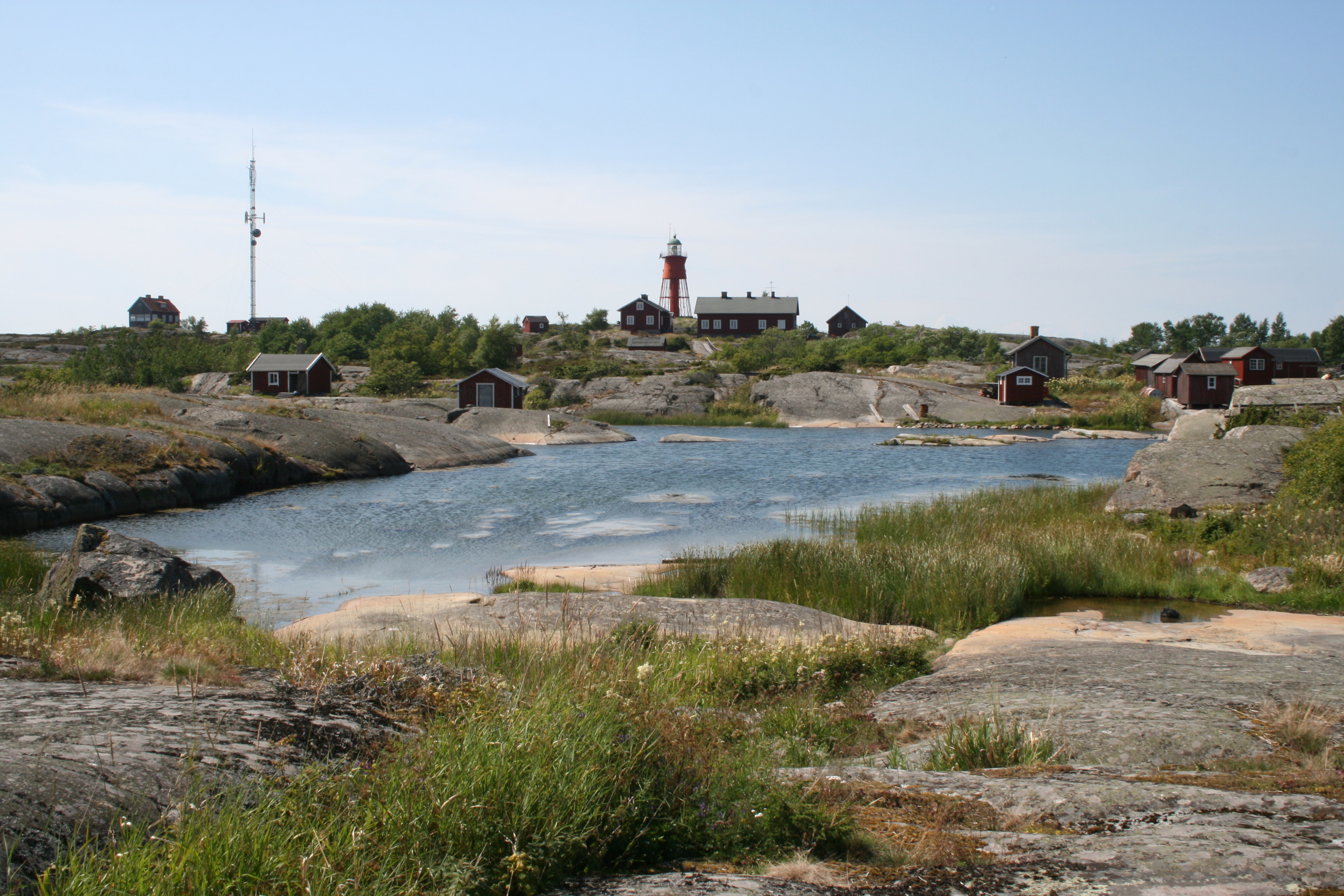
Natural harbour at the island 'Svenska Högarna'

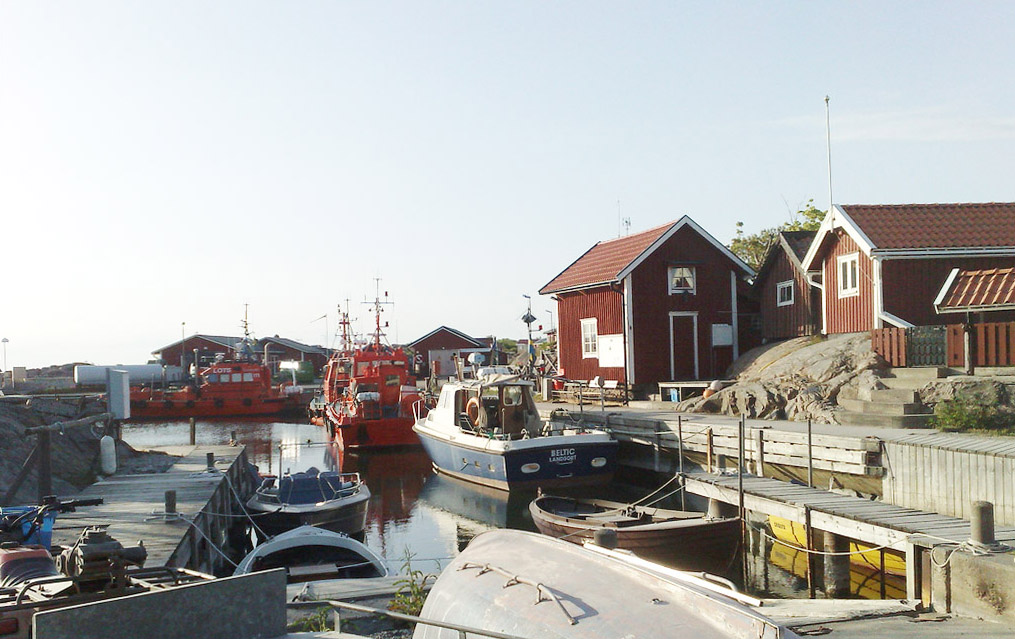
Maritime pilot station at 'Landsort'

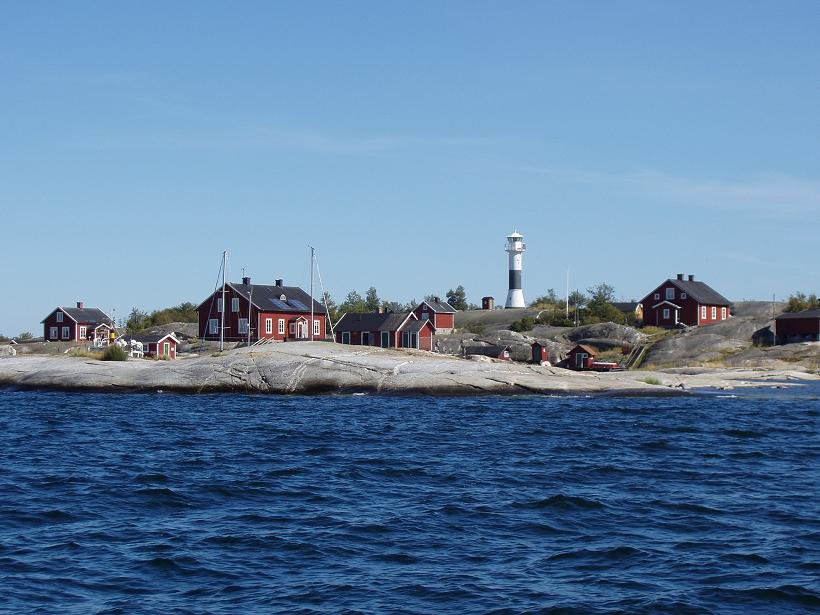
The lighthouse and buildings at the island 'Huvudskär'

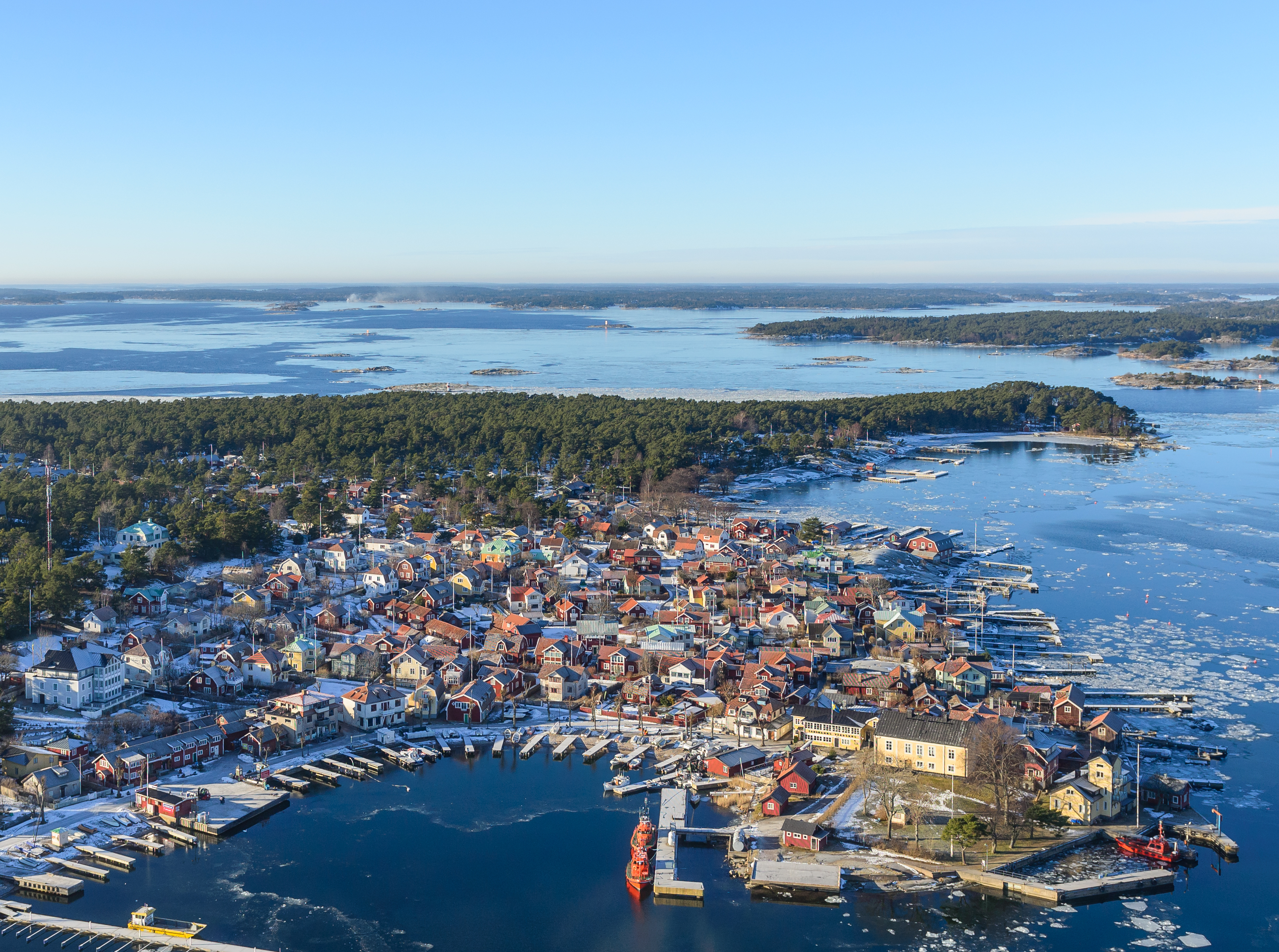
Sandhamn island

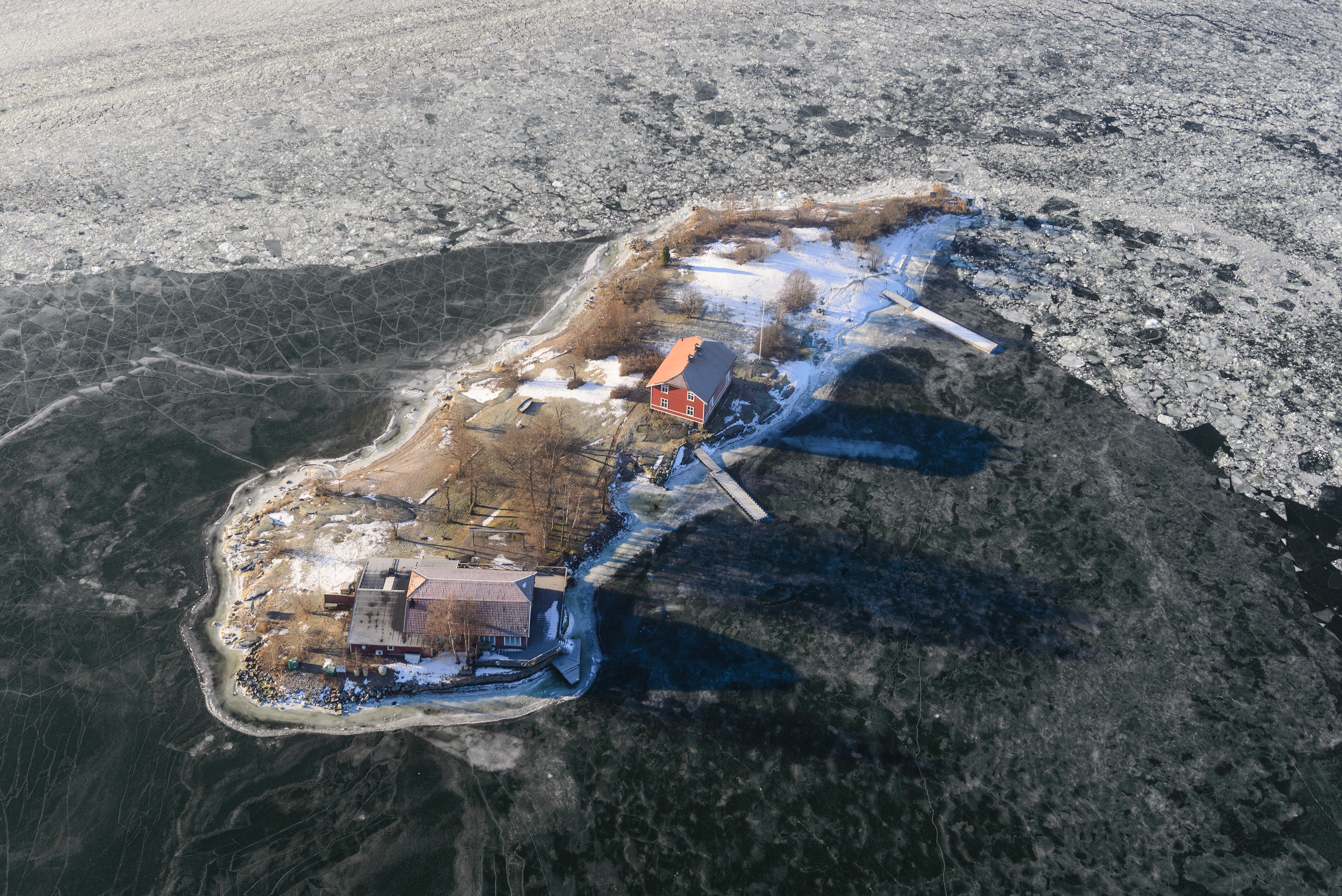
Bastugrundet in ice

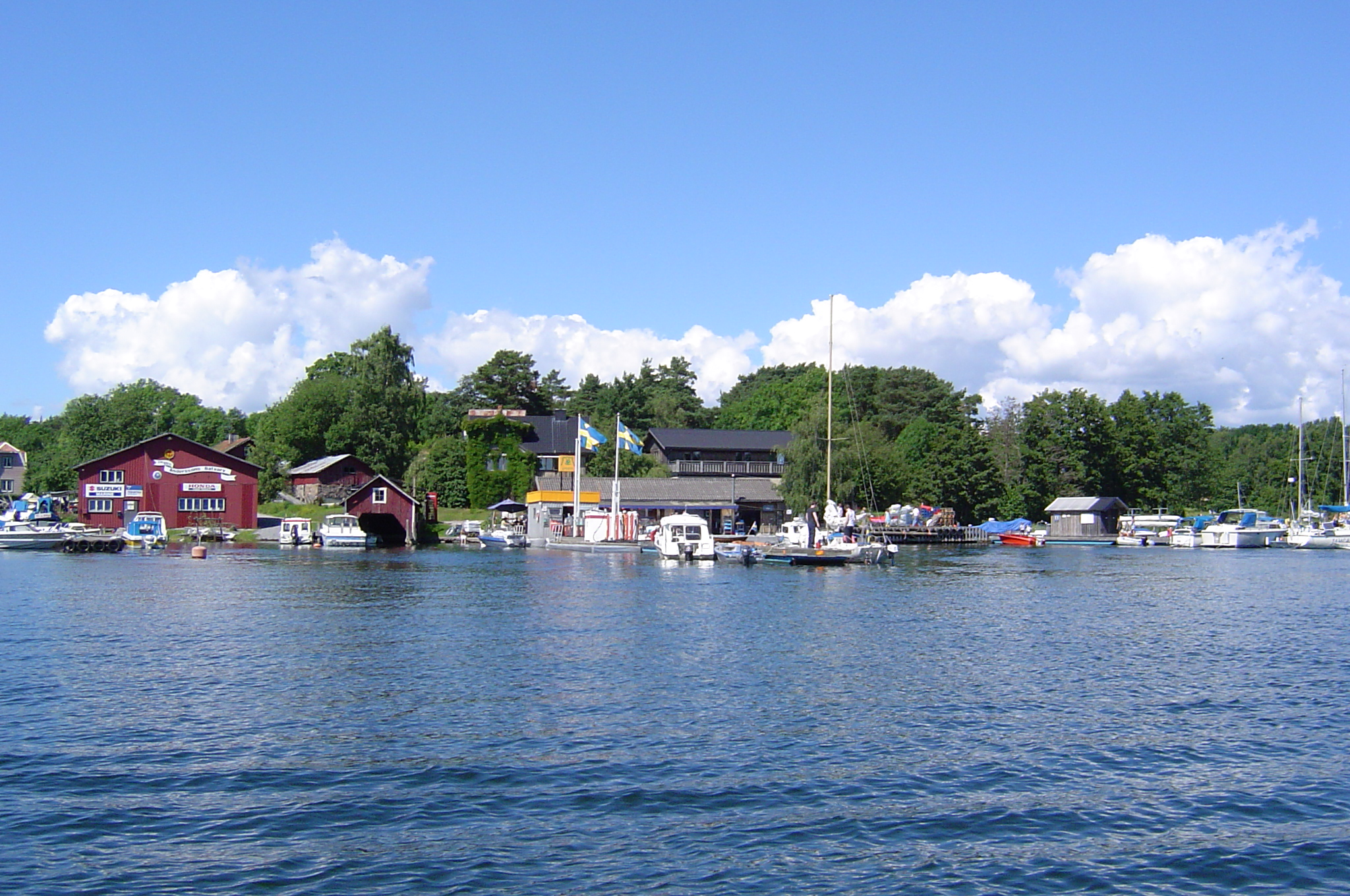
The island of Norra Stavsudda

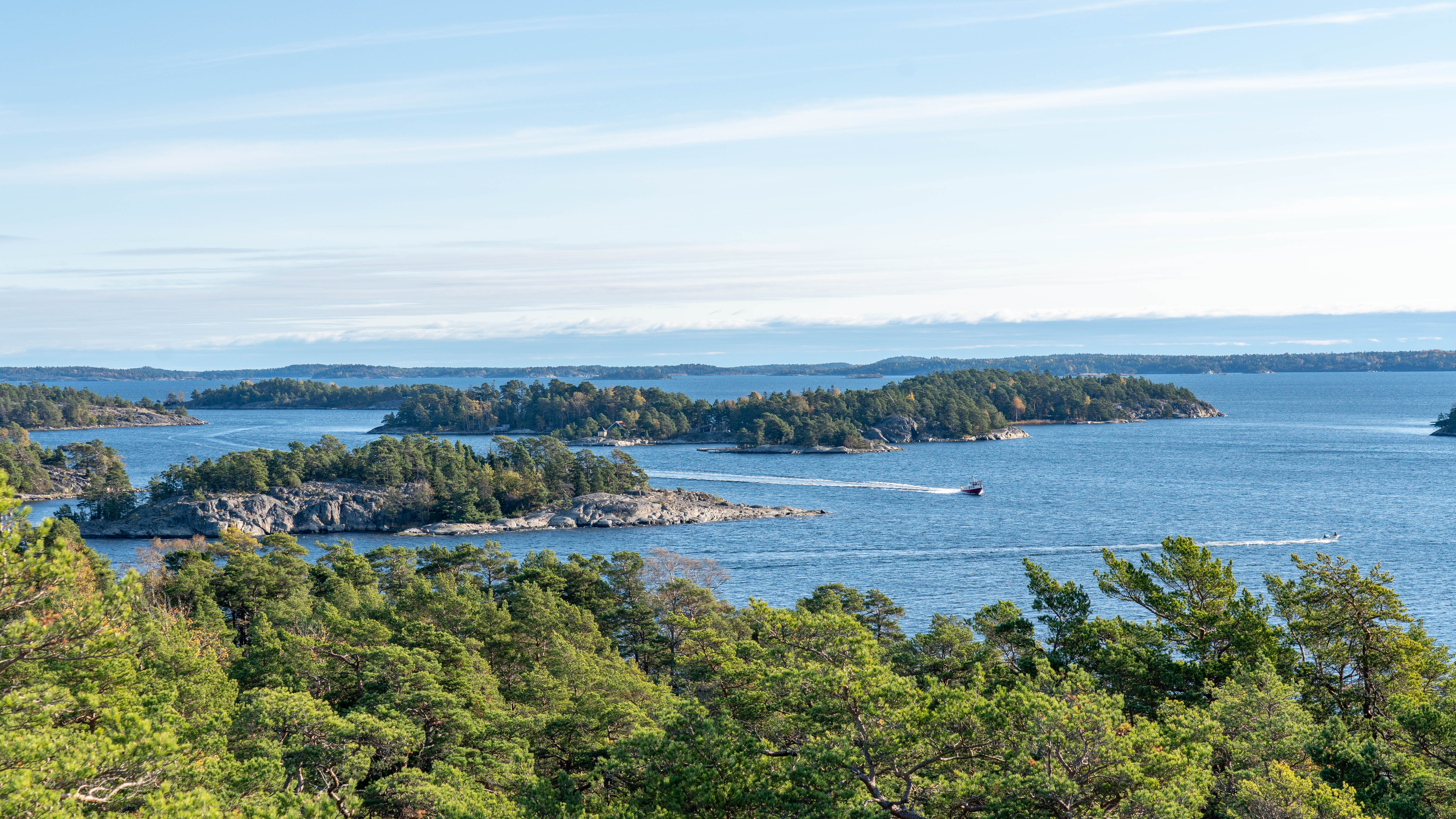
Islands in the Archipelago as seen from Björnö nature reserve

== See also ==
- List of archipelagos
- Strömma Canal
- Stockholm Archipelago Trail

== Reference nautical chart ==
- Nautical chart: International no. 1205, SE61, Baltic Sea, North, Sea of Åland.
