= Värmdö Municipality =

Värmdö Municipality Värmdö kommun
- Municipality
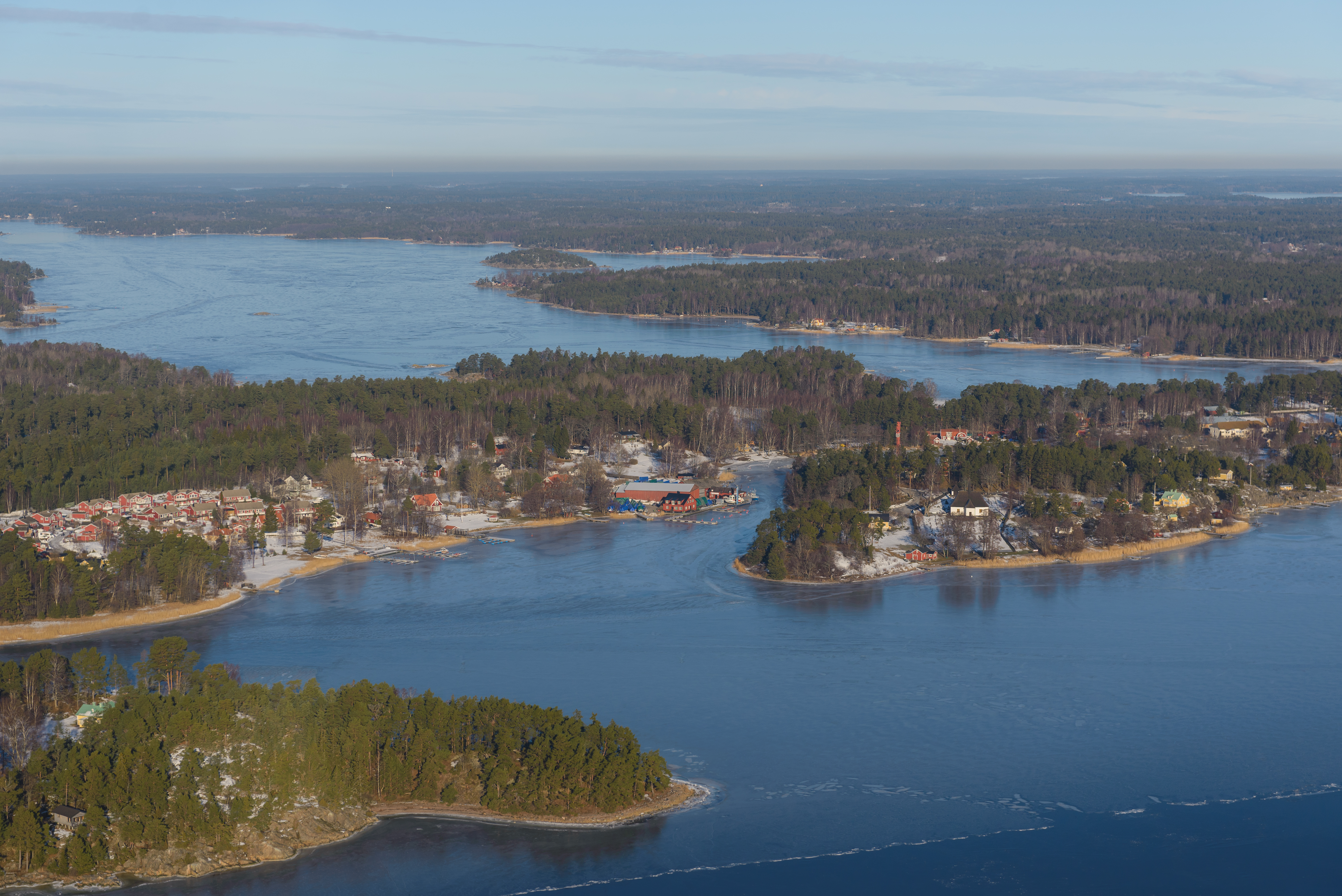

- Coat of arms

- Coordinates: 59°20′N 18°23′E
- Country: Sweden
- County: Stockholm County
- Seat: Gustavsberg

Area
  - Total: 2,980.11 km^{2} (1,150.63 sq mi)
  - Land: 448.03 km^{2} (172.99 sq mi)
  - Water: 2,532.08 km^{2} (977.64 sq mi)
- Area as of 1 January 2014.

Population (30 June 2025)
  - Total: 46,728
  - Density: 104.30/km^{2} (270.13/sq mi)
- Time zone: UTC+1 (CET)
  - Summer (DST): UTC+2 (CEST)
- ISO 3166 code: SE
- Province: Uppland and Södermanland
- Municipal code: 0120
- Website: www.varmdo.se
- Density is calculated using land area only.

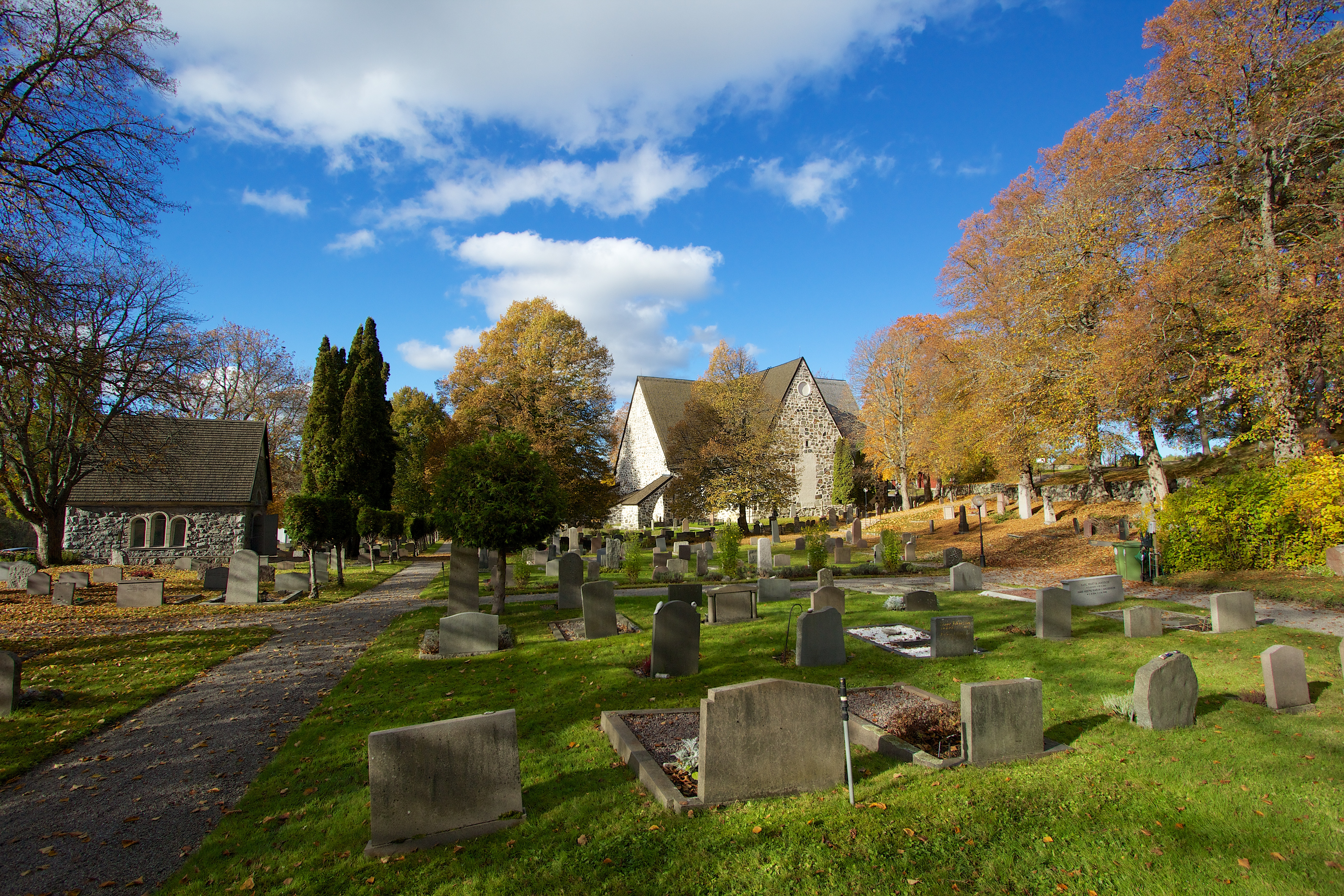
Värmdö Church, 14th century

Värmdö Municipality (Swedish: Värmdö kommun) is a municipality in Stockholm County in east central Sweden. Its seat is in the town of Gustavsberg, with a population of 9,682 (2005), on the main island at an elevation of 37 metres (121 ft).

The municipality is named after the main island Värmdön, 180 km^{2} (69 sq mi) in size.

The municipality in its present form was created in 1974, when "old" Värmdö was amalgamated with Gustavsberg (which had been detached from it in 1902) and Djurö.

== Geography ==
The municipality consists of 10,000 islands, all part of Stockholm archipelago. The larger islands are Värmdö, Ingarö, Fågelbrolandet, Djurö/Vindö, Svartsö, Möja, Granholmen, Runmarö and Nämdö. Gustavsberg is the main town, and there are also several villages and suburbs spread out such as Djurö, Stavsnäs, Mörtnäs, Hemmesta, Brunn, Strömma and Sandhamn.

== History ==
The name Värmdö can be traced to 1314, but it is not clear what it means. (It is likely that it comes from the word värmd, a small hot spring in the ocean which causes holes in the ice in winter, and which there are several of in the area.) The area has however been inhabited longer than that, probably from the Stone Age wherefrom remains are found. The people lived on fishing and the hunting of seals and sea birds. As the coast climate was not suitable for traditional cereal crops, the agricultural efforts were often directed towards the cultivation of potatoes.

After the introduction of steam boat lines around 1850, wealthy people in Stockholm started to build vacation houses around the stations. When today's main roads were built in the 1930s, only the steam boats serving islands remained, and the expansion continued. With the municipal reform in the 1970s, Värmdö was created through a merger between six small municipalities and adopted the coat of arms of Gustavsberg, with two porcelain ovens.

Värmdö is a rapidly expanding suburban area to Stockholm and also one of the most exclusive areas for vacation houses in Sweden. During the summer month, the population triples.

== Industry ==
The industry of the municipality was dominated by the porcelain factory in Gustavsberg, established in the 1820s. Around the year 1900, 1,000 people were employed there, making it one of the largest working places in Sweden.

During the summer the population of the municipality triples due to the large number of tourists and vacation houses.

== Demography ==
=== Population development ===
Population development in Värmdö Municipality 1970–2019
Year	Population
1970	12,882
1975	16,050
1980	17,846
1985	19,173
1990	22,067
1995	26,548
2000	31,260
2005	34,933
2010	38,301
2015	41,107
2017	43,444
2019	45,000
Source: SCB - Folkmängd efter region och år.

=== 2022 by district ===
This is a demographic table based on Värmdö Municipality's electoral districts in the 2022 Swedish general election sourced from SVT's election platform, in turn taken from SCB official statistics.

In total there were 46,157 residents, including 33,811 Swedish citizens of voting age. 45.5% voted for the left coalition and 53.4% for the right coalition. Indicators are in percentage points except population totals and income.

Location	Residents	Citizen adults	Left vote	Right vote	Employed	Swedish parents	Foreign heritage	Income SEK	Degree
Location			%	%					
Djurö 1 Vindö	1,108	969	38.8	59.9	80	88	12	24,504	32
Djurö 2 Djurö	1,267	1,002	39.9	59.3	81	82	18	25,762	32
Djurö 3 Stavsnäs	2,157	1,650	42.6	55.7	77	79	21	26,295	41
Gustavsberg 1 Lugnet	2,096	1,528	55.8	43.0	82	75	25	25,217	39
Gustavsberg 2 Hästhagen	2,032	1,569	56.7	42.2	82	78	22	26,323	42
Gustavsberg 3 Munkmora	1,948	1,392	53.9	44.0	77	59	41	23,096	30
Gustavsberg 4 Höjdhagen	1,529	1,117	62.8	36.3	87	82	18	33,015	59
Gustavsberg 5 Ösbydalen	1,650	1,183	53.9	45.6	86	83	17	31,431	48
Gustavsberg 6 Ormingelandet	1,362	1,019	43.0	56.9	81	87	13	37,061	58
Gustavsberg 7 Farsta & Hamn	1,270	935	62.1	37.3	89	85	15	33,644	63
Gustavsberg 8 Mörtnäs	1,959	1,271	45.4	54.1	89	89	11	42,646	65
Gustavsberg 9 Mölnvik	1,572	1,033	47.9	50.7	84	81	19	30,203	47
Gustavsberg 10 Charlottendal	1,421	978	52.9	46.3	89	87	13	33,556	60
Gustavsberg 11 Porslinkv. S	1,504	1,106	52.9	45.9	87	74	26	29,755	47
Gustavsberg 12 Porslinkv. N	881	800	48.8	50.1	85	80	20	29,256	50
Ingarö 1 Lemshaga	2,069	1,490	40.8	58.0	84	85	15	33,828	48
Ingarö 2 Säby Eknäs	1,715	1,307	39.2	59.3	85	83	17	30,720	39
Ingarö 3 Ingaröstrand	1,861	1,354	36.0	63.6	88	89	11	36,634	49
Ingarö 4 Klacknäset	1,909	1,388	45.7	53.0	84	82	18	31,099	46
Värmdö 1 Saltarö	1,625	1,237	36.6	62.0	82	83	17	29,869	37
Värmdö 2 Strömma	1,442	1,122	34.4	64.6	78	84	16	31,488	45
Värmdö 3 Ängsvik	2,531	1,821	42.4	56.6	82	82	18	30,073	44
Värmdö 4 Hemmesta	1,322	940	46.5	51.6	77	75	25	24,594	33
Värmdö 5 Vik	2,034	1,338	42.9	56.5	90	89	11	42,007	61
Värmdö 6 Kopparmora	2,267	1,671	38.4	60.7	85	84	16	31,532	38
Värmdö 7 Haghulta	1,708	1,219	46.3	52.7	86	88	12	36,369	55
Värmdö 8 Herrviknäs	1,918	1,372	36.3	63.4	84	85	15	33,480	44
Source: SVT

=== Residents with a foreign background ===
On 31 December 2017 the number of people with a foreign background (persons born outside of Sweden or with two parents born outside of Sweden) was 7 305, or 16.81% of the population (43 444 on 31 December 2017). On 31 December 2002 the number of residents with a foreign background was (per the same definition) 4 515, or 13.82% of the population (32 664 on 31 December 2002). On 31 December 2017 there were 43 444 residents in Värmdö, of which 5 683 people (13.08%) were born in a country other than Sweden. Divided by country in the table below - the Nordic countries as well as the 12 most common countries of birth outside of Sweden for Swedish residents have been included, with other countries of birth bundled together by continent by Statistics Sweden.

Country of birth
31 December 2017
1	Sweden	37,761
2	Finland	1,156
3	European Union: Other countries	1,035
4	Asia: Other countries	488
5	Poland	356
6	South America	289
7	Europe outside of the EU: other countries	237
8	Africa: Other countries	216
9	Thailand	211
10	Germany	197
11	Iraq	196
12	Syria	190
13	North America	166
14	Afghanistan	161
15	Norway	140
16	Yugoslavia/Yugoslavia; SFR Yugoslavia/Serbia and Montenegro	134
17	Iran	125
18	Eritrea	90
19	Denmark	82
20	Oceania	46
21	Turkey	42
22	Somalia	36
23	Soviet Union	31
24	Bosnia and Herzegovina	30
25	Iceland	27
26	Unknown country of birth	2

== Transport ==
Värmdö is more easily accessible by water than by land. The boat service Waxholmsbolaget offers routes to various islands in the Värmdö archipelago. By land, the major road is the county road 222, a motorway from Stockholm. It ends in the ferry harbour of Stavsnäs, one of the major connection points in the Stockholm archipelago.

The municipality has no rail connection, but is served by a number of bus routes operated by Storstockholms Lokaltrafik, SL. Most buses terminate in Stockholm at Slussen. In 2018, the bus terminal was moved to a temporary terminal to the east, which has a higher capacity than the old slot.

Some of the major bus lines to Värmdö include 422 from Nacka, 425, 433, 434, and 474 from Stockholm. Bus connections have improved significantly since the addition of several routes in 2005.

== Sports ==
The following sports clubs are in Värmdö Municipality:

- Värmdö IF
- Värmdö Hockey

== Notable people ==
- Peter Jöback
- Henrik von Rehbinder
- Felix Sandman

== International Relations ==
Värmdö Municipality participates with:

- Guelph, Ontario, Canada
- Haaksbergen, Overijssel, Netherlands
- Ploemeur, Bretagne, France
- Raippaluoto, Ostrobothnia, Finland
- Spa, Liège, Belgium
- Tabarja, Mount Lebanon Governorate, Lebanon

Honorary cities:

- Ptuj, Drava, Slovenia
- Sunnfjord, Vestland, Norway

== See also ==
- Strömma Canal
