= Finnhamn =

Harbour in Österåker Municipality, Sweden

Coordinates: 59°28′39″N 18°48′56″E

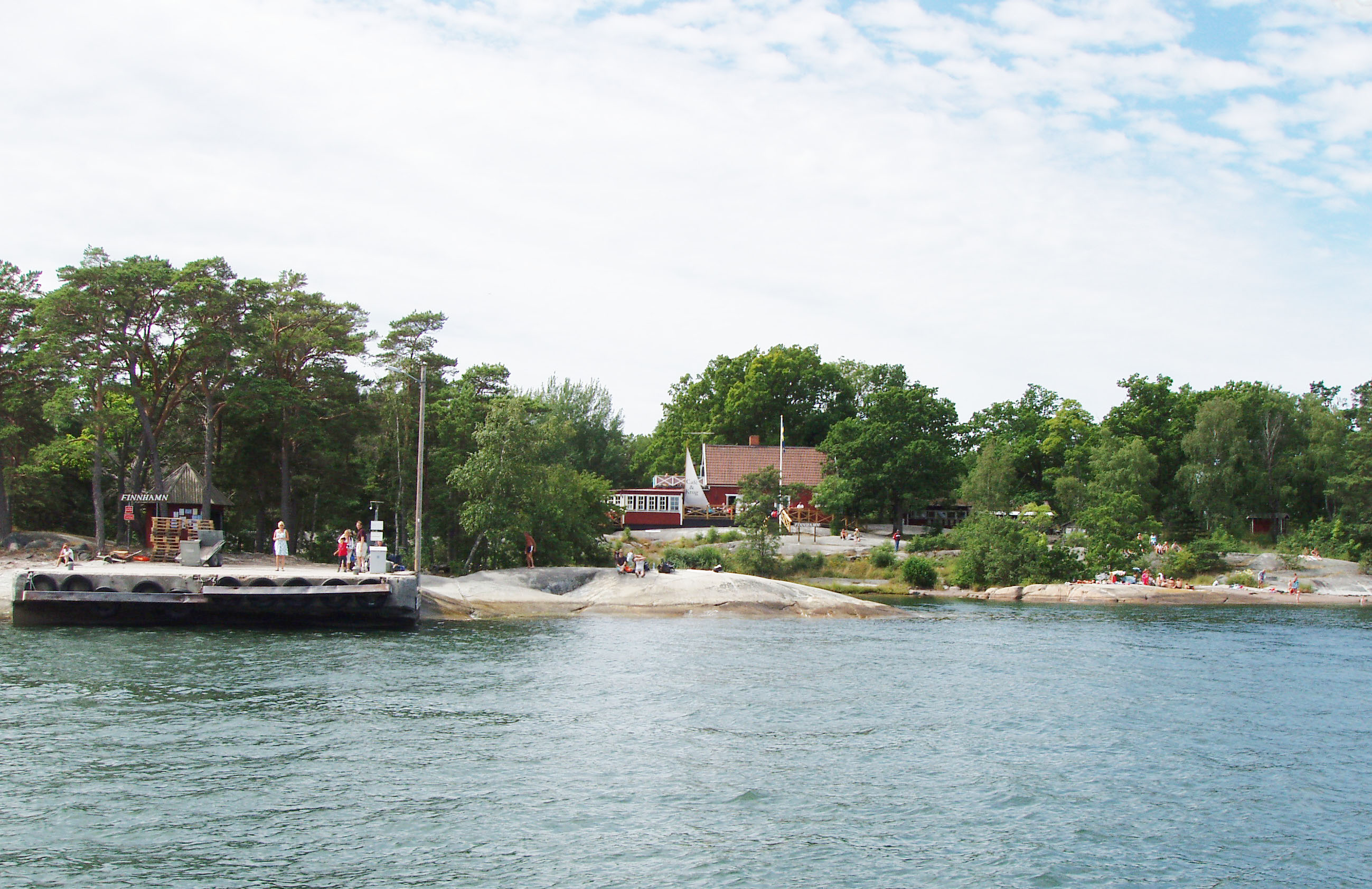
The main port of Finnhamn.

Finnhamn is a natural harbour on the island of Stora Jolpan in the Stockholm archipelago. It is in Österåker Municipality and lies to the east of Ingmarsö and to the west of Husarö. The name Finnhamn is derived from the Finnish boats which called into the harbour on their way to and from Stockholm, and is often now used for the island as well as the harbour. Finnhamn was bought by Stockholm City in 1943.

A wealthy coal merchant built a house here in 1915 and this is now a youth hostel which is open all year round. Other facilities on Finnhamn are holiday cabins, and a seasonally open restaurant and shop.

Two companies, Cinderellabåtarna and Waxholmsbolaget, have scheduled ferry services to the islands. The journey takes around two and a half hours from the centre of Stockholm.

== See also ==
- Stockholm Archipelago Trail
