= Grinda =

Island in the Stockholm archipelago, Sweden

Coordinates: 59°24′40″N 18°33′57″E

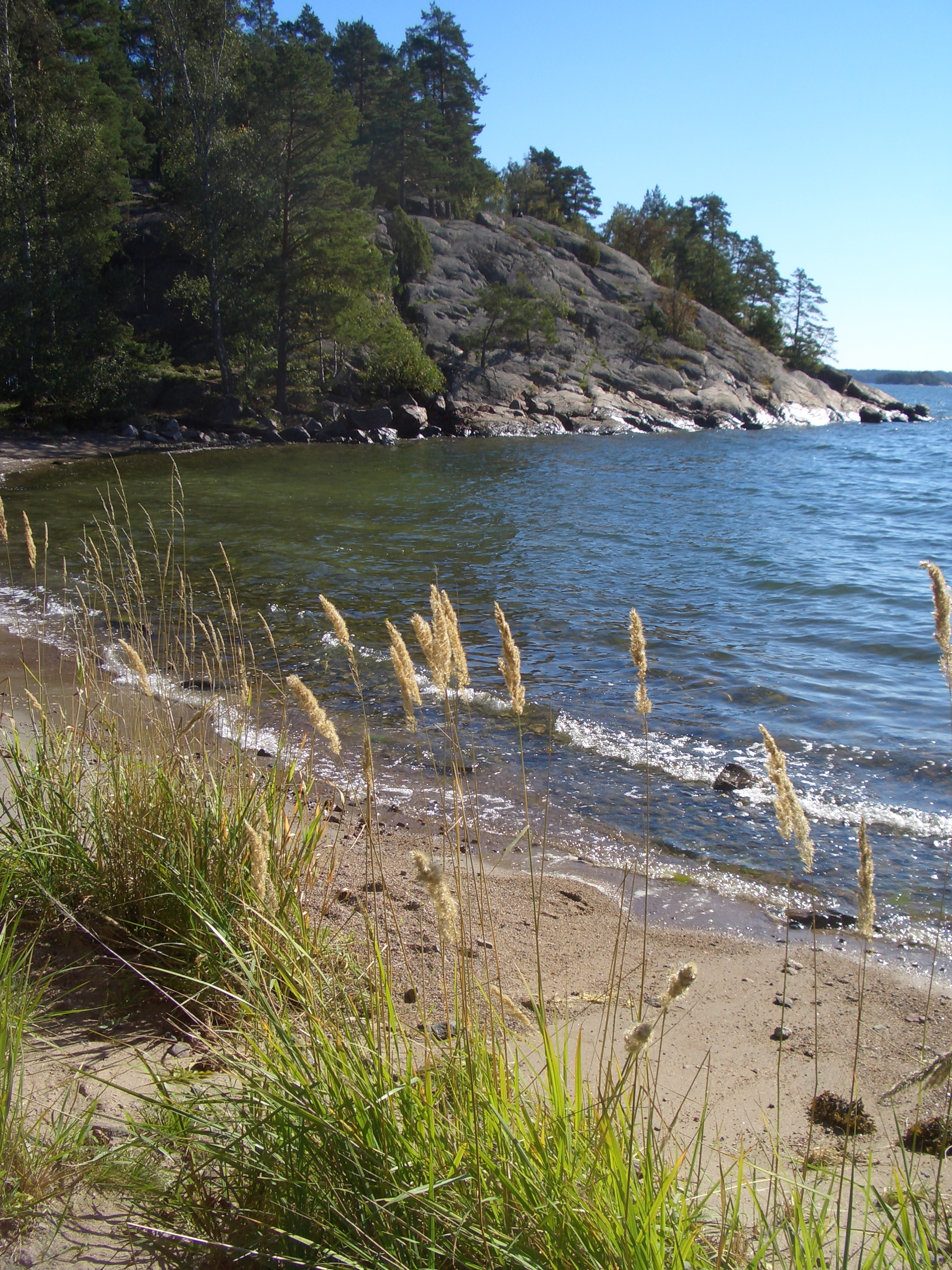
Beach at Södra Grinda, near the landing for boats at the southern tip of the island

Grinda is an island located in the Stockholm archipelago, Sweden. It is located south of Ljusterö, east of Vaxholm and west of Svartsö and Möja.

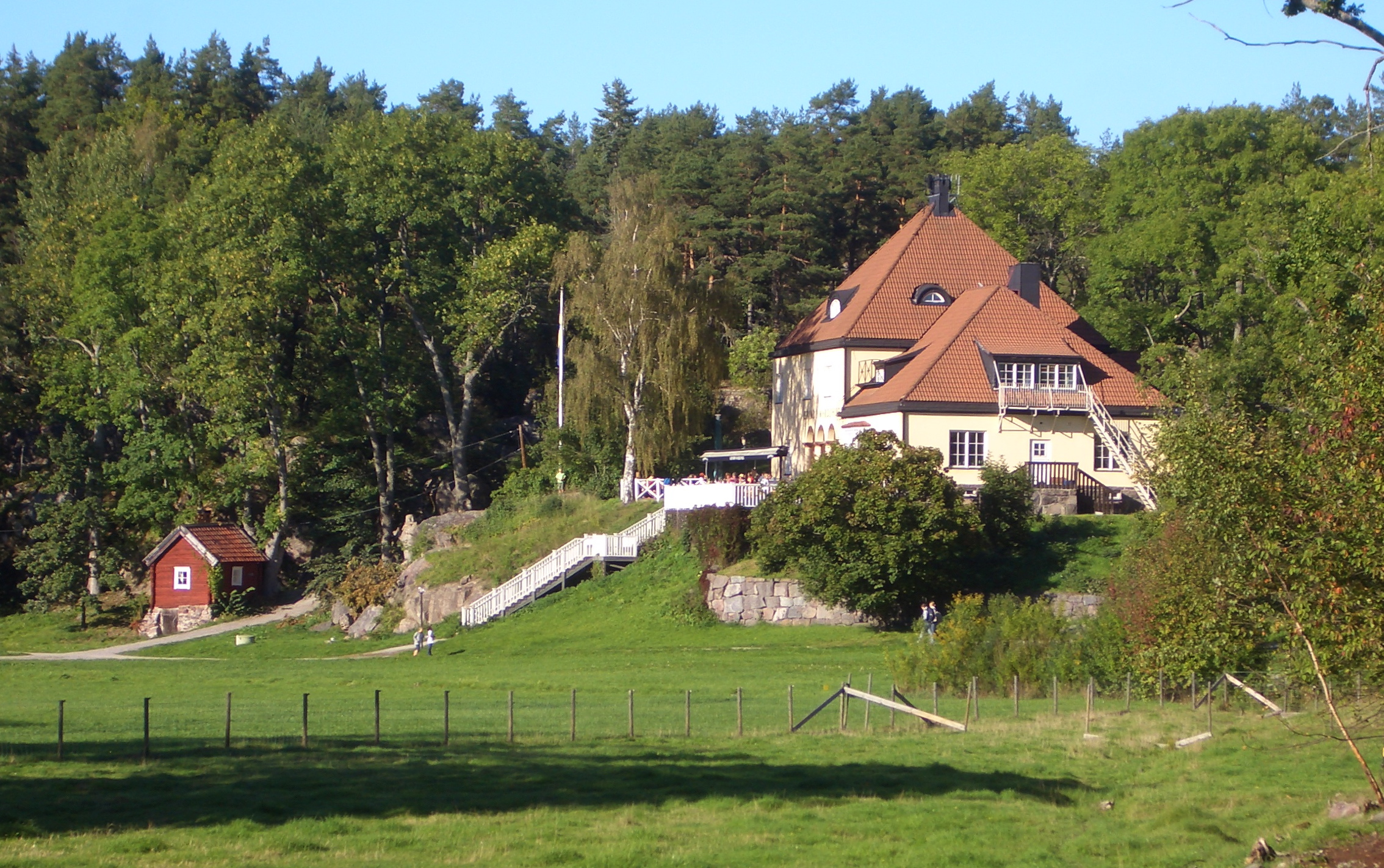
Grinda Värdshus - the tavern.

Grinda is a popular island especially during summer, for campers, tourists and people travelling the Stockholm archipelago by boat. Most of the island is owned by the non-profit organisation Skärgårdsstiftelsen (Archipelago Foundation), whose purpose is keeping the island's nature and facilities in good condition for outside visitors. The island hosts a tavern, bar and grocery store, and is frequented daily during the summer season by the passenger ferries of Waxholmsbolaget.

An annual seven day long Super Smash Bros. Melee tournament named Festa has been held on the island every August since 2022, and currently attracts around 130 players from around Europe and America. Outside of the Smash Bros. events, there are also traditional sports such as kubb and soccer.

== See also ==
- Stockholm Archipelago Trail
