= Runmarö =

Island in Sweden

Coordinates: 59°17′N 18°46′E

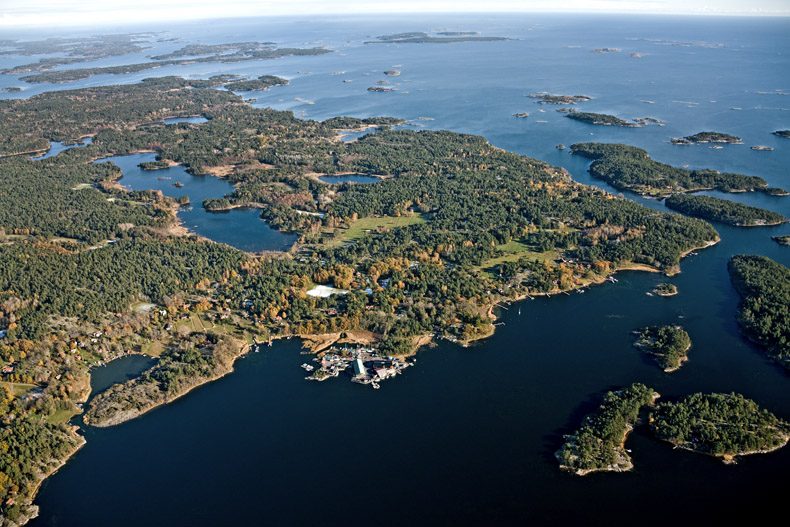
View of the Stockholm archipelago

Runmarö is an island located in the Stockholm archipelago in Sweden. The island is known for its many species of orchids (at least 27 different kinds) and 9 marshy lakes.

== Notable residents ==
Author and entomologist Fredrik Sjöberg lives on the island with his family. The island is frequently referenced in his 2014 novel The Fly Trap.

== See also ==
- Stockholm Archipelago Trail
