= Arholma =

Island in Sweden

Coordinates: 59°51′N 19°7′E

Arholma is an island in the northeastern part of the Stockholm archipelago in Norrtälje Municipality. It is 5 kilometres (3.1 mi) long by 2 kilometres (1.2 mi) wide. It is the northernmost island in the archipelago before the Sea of Åland. The island is characterised by a picturesque combination of traditional wooden buildings, farmland, forests and rocky shorelines.

The island rose from the sea during the Stone Age and now reaches a maximum height of 25 metres (82 ft) above sea level. It is mentioned in the 13th century sailing route of King Valdemar, which describes a passage through the archipelago past Åland to Estonia (then occupied by the Danes).

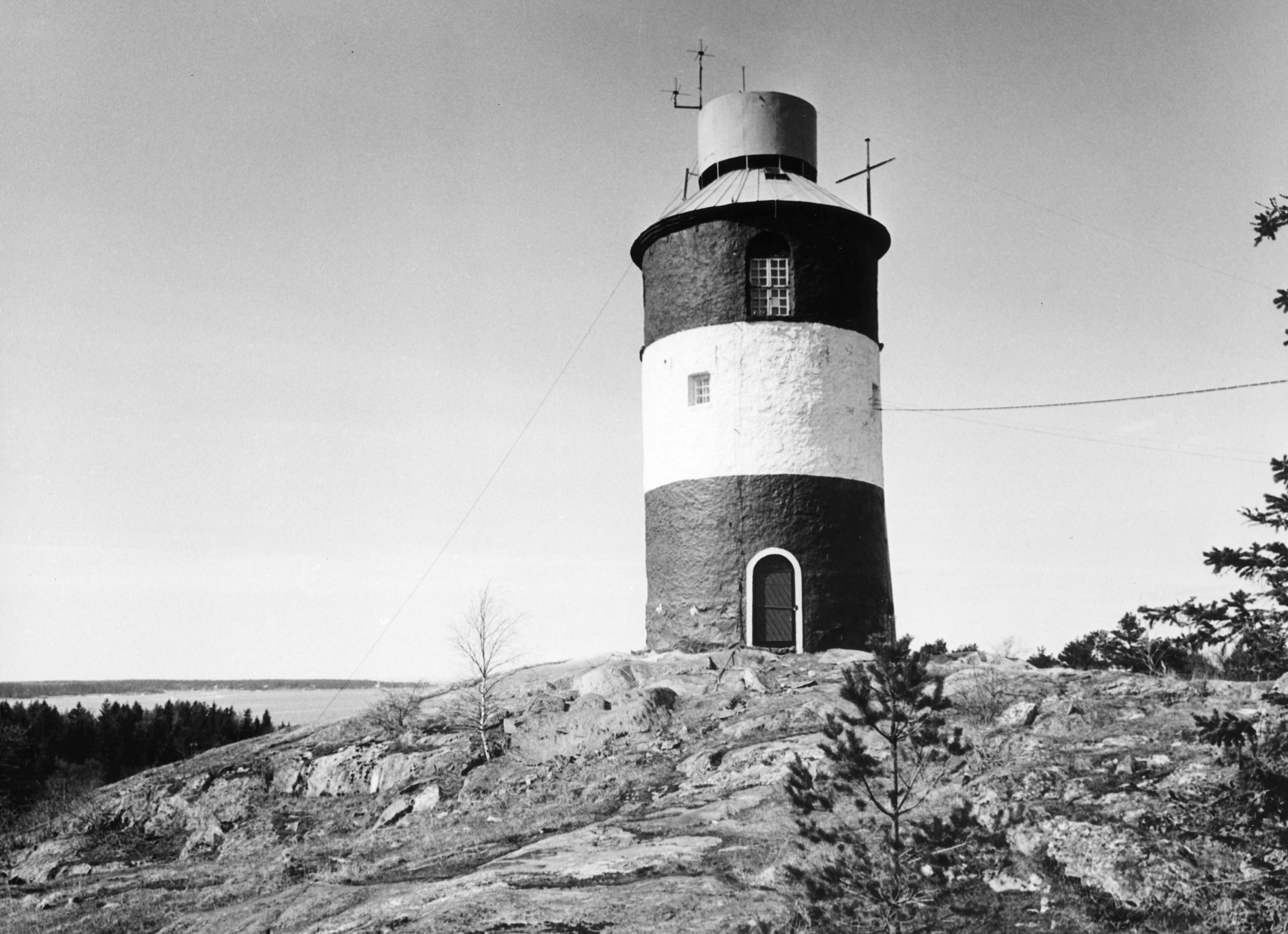
Lighthouse on Arholma. Photo of 1966

The island's highest point was formerly occupied by a coal-fired lighthouse, which was replaced by the present red-and-white structure in the 18th century. The construction of the current lighthouse, which stands 16 metres (52 ft) high and 8 metres (26 ft), was completed in 1768. It was partly built from stones retrieved from the ruins of Lidö Castle, destroyed in the Russian Pillage of 1719-1721, which also badly affected Arholma. The lighthouse is visible from a distance of 15 nautical miles (28 km) and is now a listed building; the interior is used as an art gallery during the summer.

Arholma's inhabitants hunted, farmed and fished before piloting became one of their principal sources of income. The islanders soon became wealthy ship-owners and sailors, putting their earnings into constructing bigger and better farms. During the winter months they anchored their vessels at Arholma's principal harbour, Österhamn, which was built during the island's peak of prosperity in the late 19th century. When the shipping trade began to decline, a number of Arholma farmers converted their residences into pensions and the island became extremely popular with holidaymakers.

During the 1930s, Arholma became part of Havsbandslinjen (Marine Band Line), a chain of fortifications constructed to protect the sea approaches to Stockholm. A 10.5 cm coastal battery was constructed on the north end of the island. The Arholma norra fort, which housed the battery, was completed in 1968 and could accommodate a garrison of 110 men. It operated in conjunction with another battery on the nearby island of Ovenskär, collectively comprising the Arholma battery. It was decommissioned in the 1990s and opened to the public in 2008 as a museum and national monument under the management of three local associations.

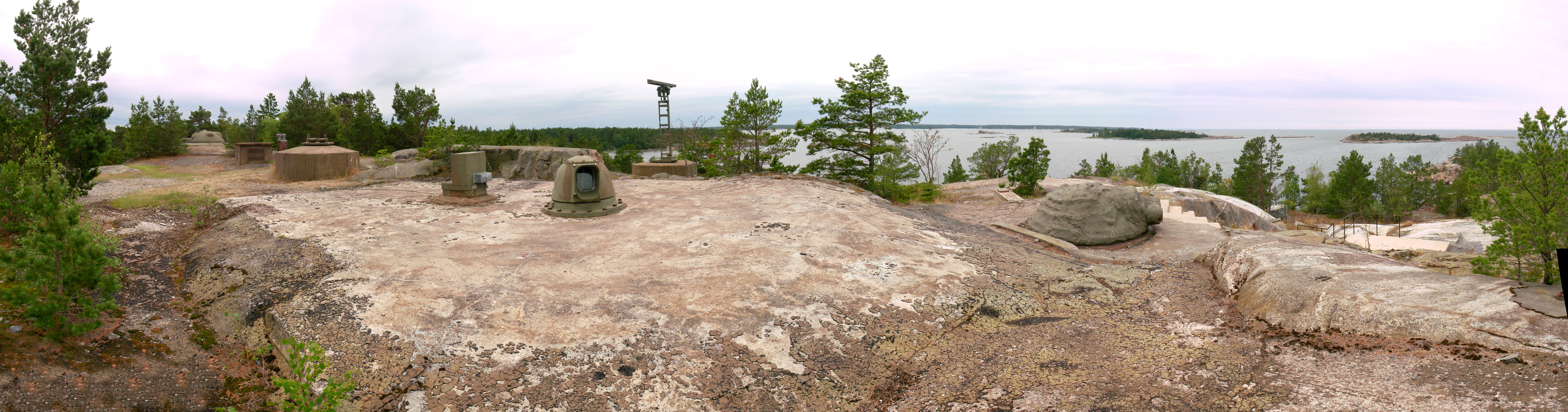
Guidance equipment for directing fire at the coastal defence battery on Arholma.

== Gallery ==
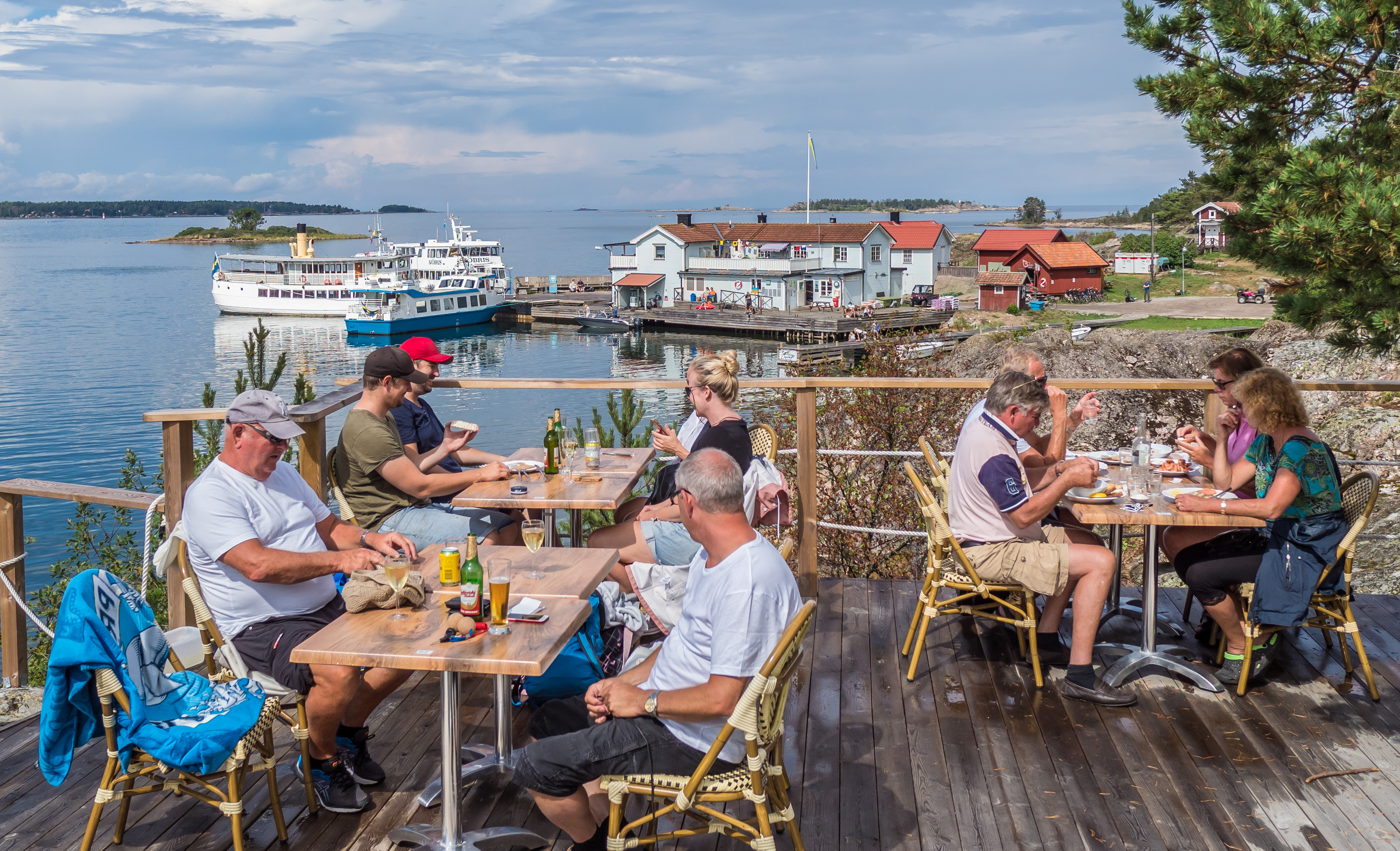
Arholma, restaurant terras

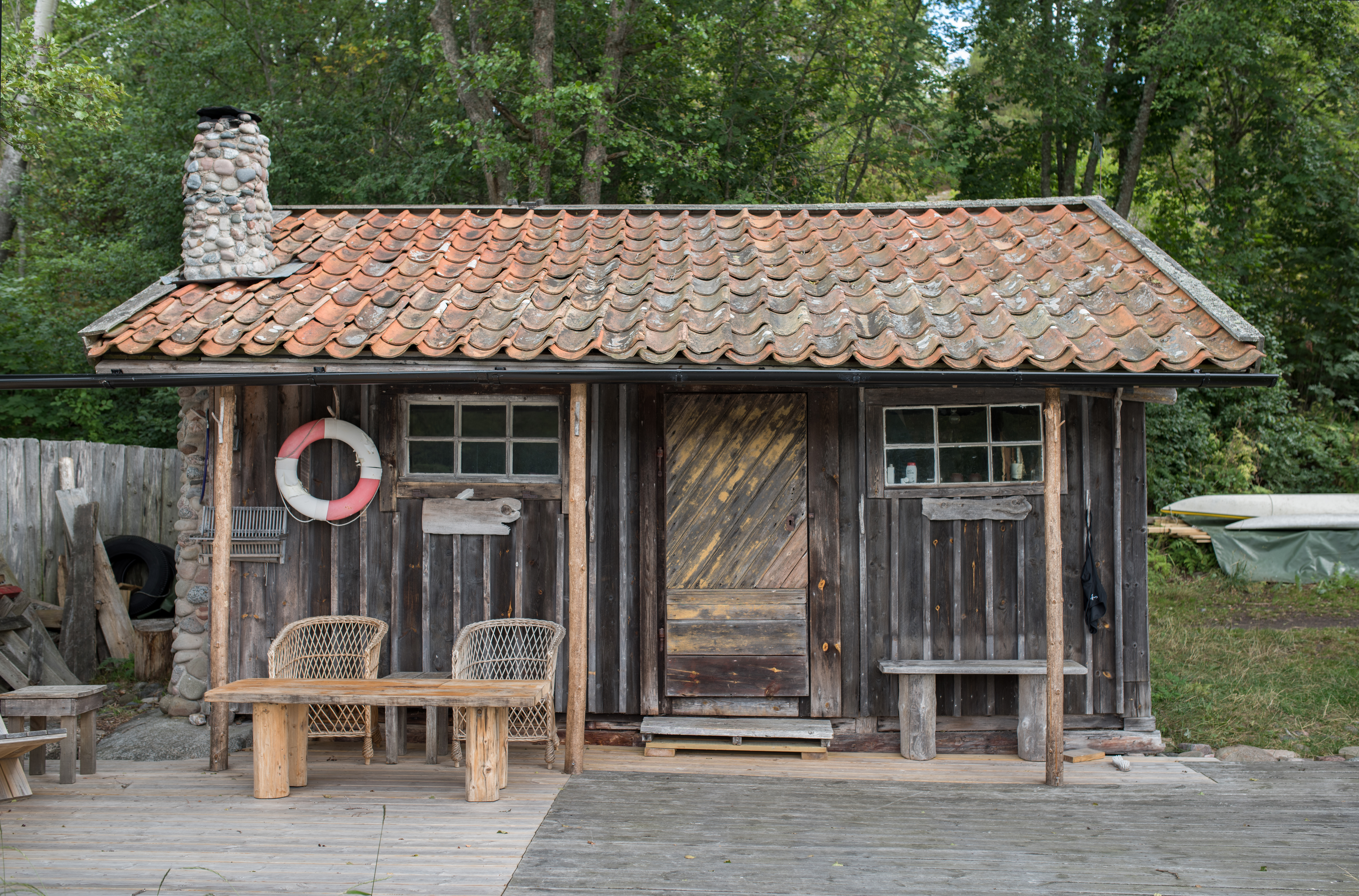
Arholma, boathouse

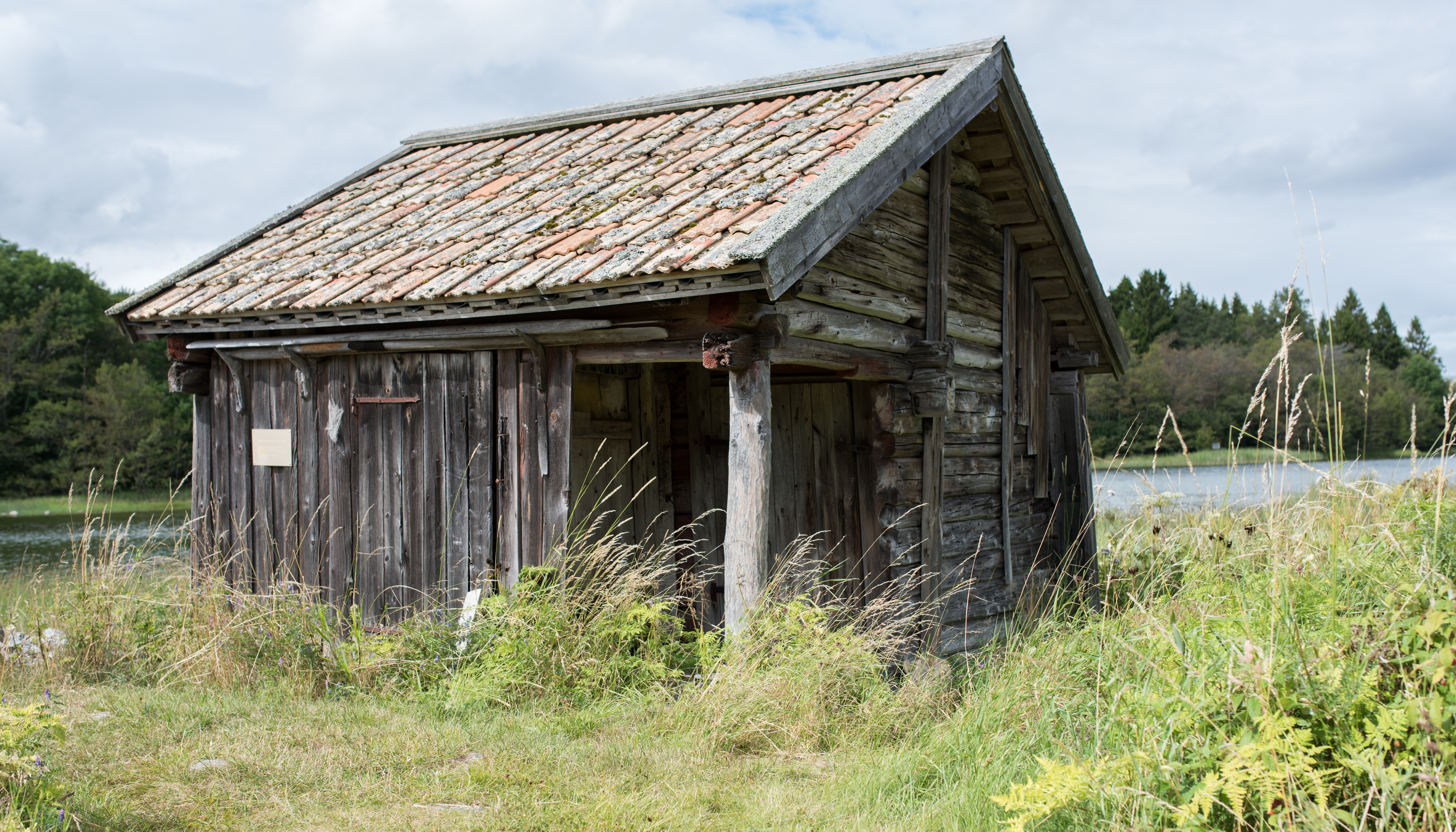
Arholma, abandoned boathouse

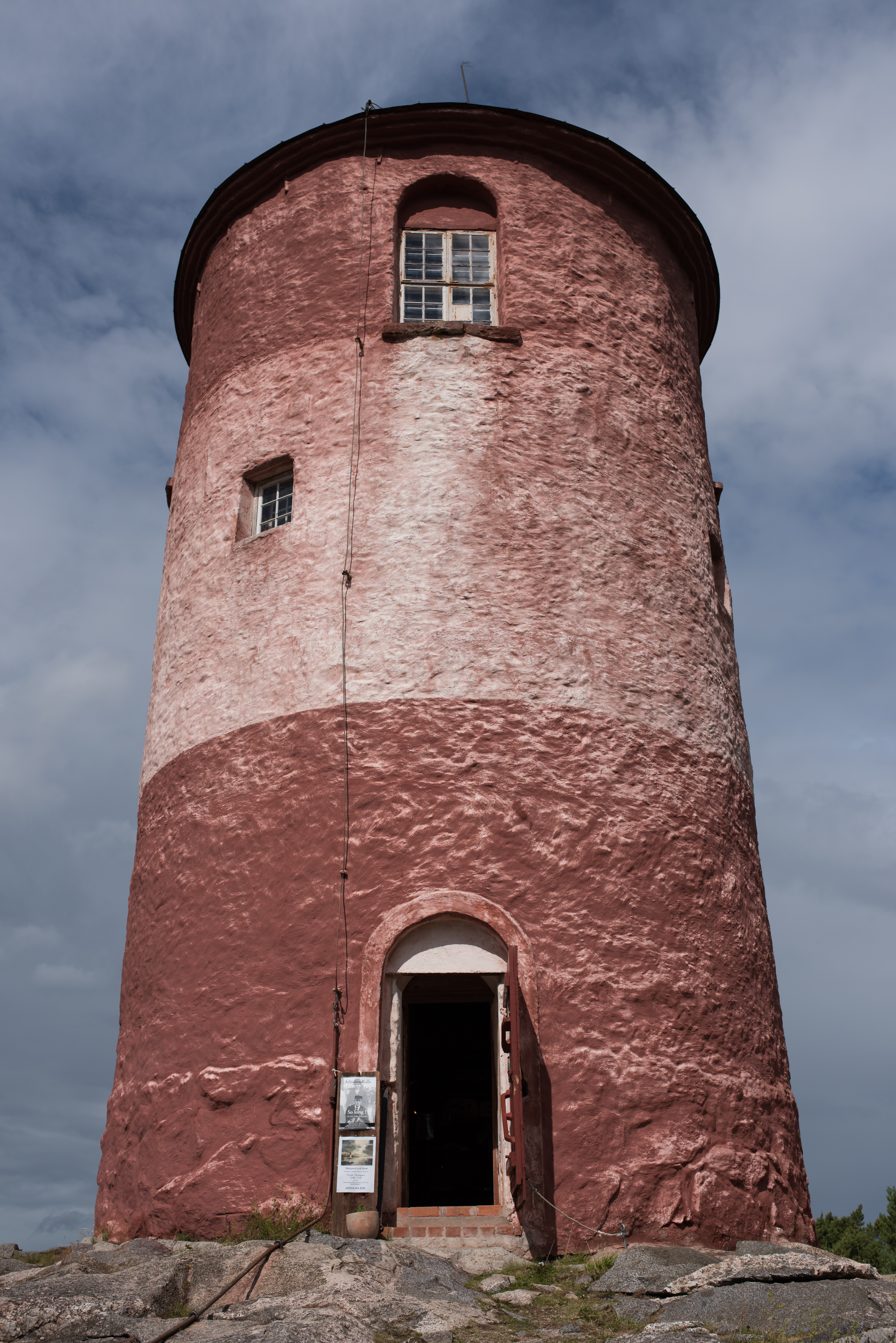
Arholma, former lighthouse, the "Båk" 2017

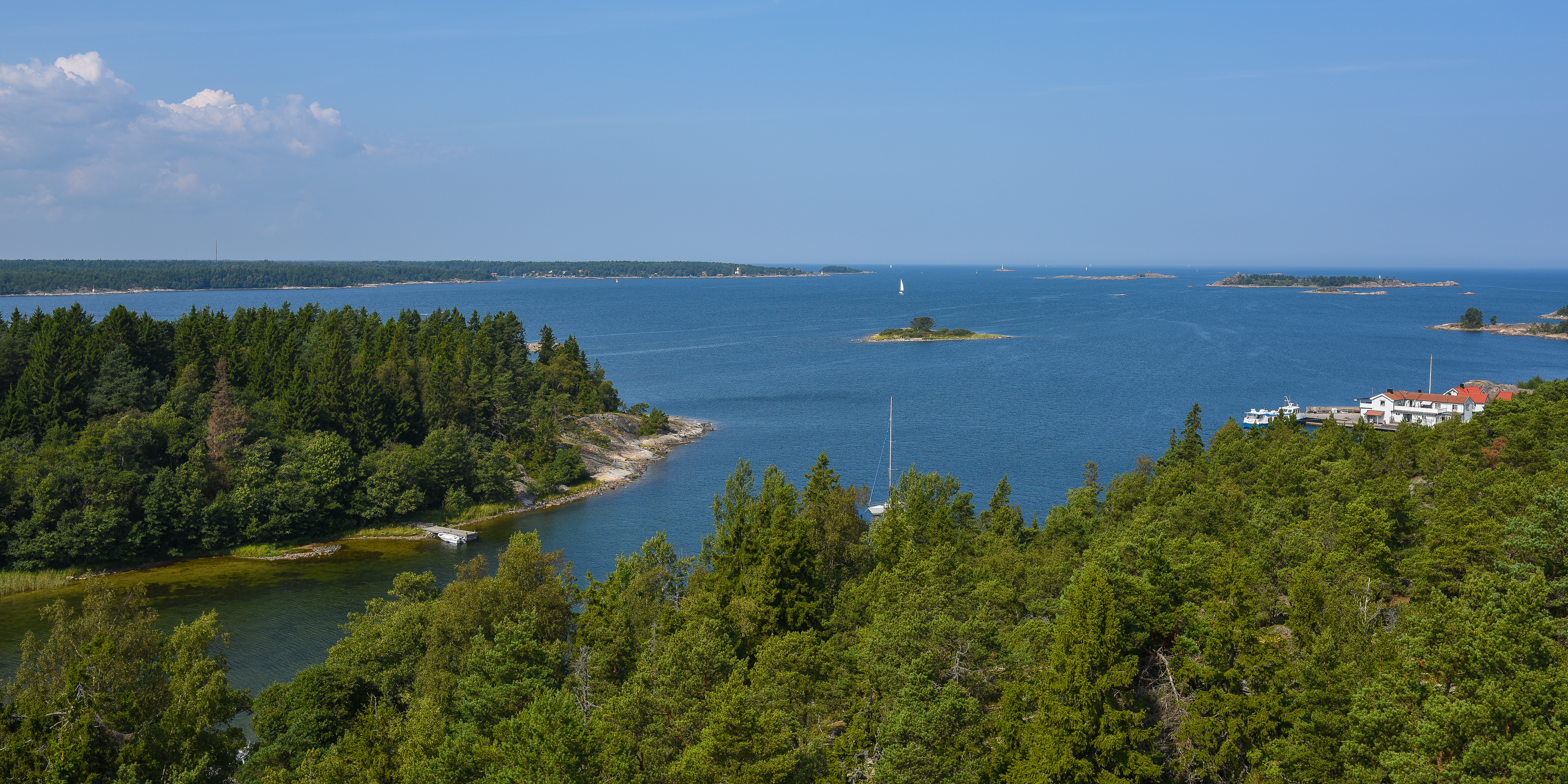
Arholma, view from the "Båk", the former lighthouse

In 1963, Skärgårdsstiftelsen (the Archipelago Foundation) started a programme of nature conservation on Arholma. It now owns a quarter of the island, using traditional methods of forestry and farming to conserve the natural environment, and has built a guest harbour at Ahlmansviken. A large area of Arlanda and the neighbouring islands are protected as part of a nature reserve.

Today the island has a year-round population of about 70 people, which increases to about 600 during the summer. It is connected to the mainland at Simpäs via a year-round ferry route.

== See also ==
- Stockholm Archipelago Trail
