= Ornö =

Island in Stockholm archipelago

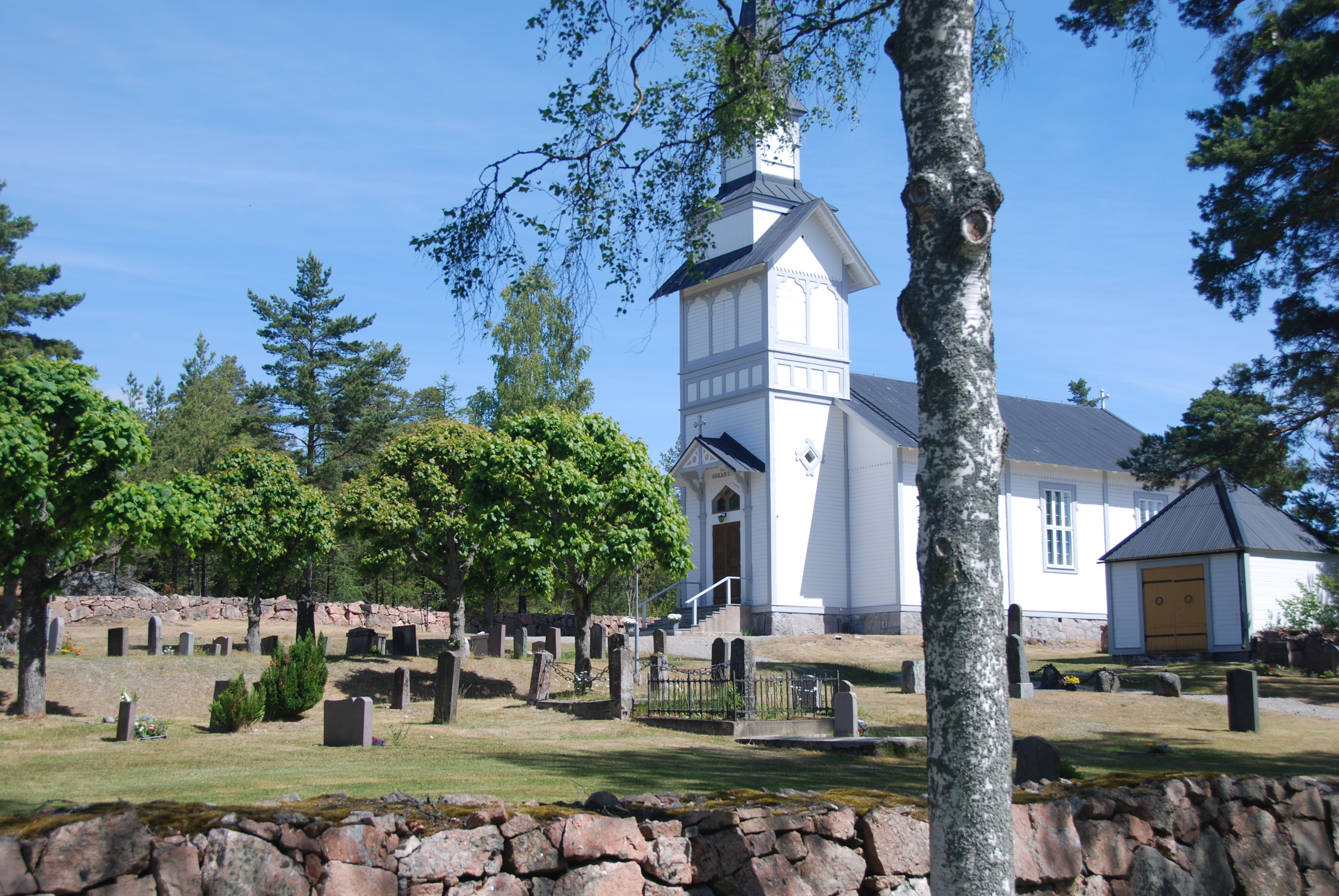
- Ornö Church

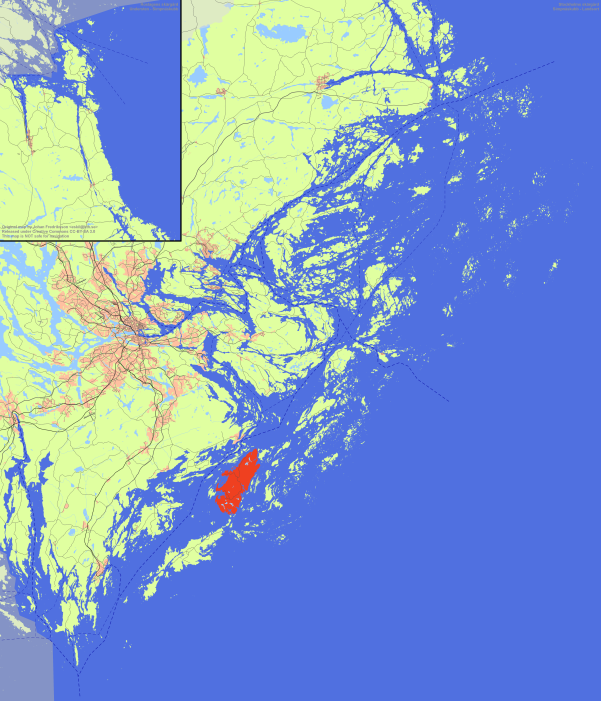
- Ornö in the Stockholm archipelago.

Geography
- Location: Stockholm archipelago
- Coordinates: 59°03′N 18°24′E
- Area: 48.99 km^{2} (18.92 sq mi)

Administration
- Sweden
- County: Stockholm
- Municipality: Haninge

Ornö is the largest island in the southern half of the Stockholm archipelago, situated just north of the island of Utö. It belongs to the municipality of Haninge. The island is approx. 15 km long and 3–4 km wide.

The primary connection with the mainland, a car ferry line, is operated by Ornö Sjötrafik. This is a community owned company. The ferry goes between Dalarö on the mainland and Hässelmara on north-western Ornö. There are some 300 people living on the island all year round. During summer, the number of people on the island multiplies.

Each year by the end of may, the largest sailing competition in the Stockholm archipelago takes place around the island. It is called the Ornö runt or Around the island of Ornö and is open to anyone who registers for the race. There are several classes in which to enter including a family friendly class. Tyresö boatclub which arranges the race, celebrated the 35th incarnation of the competition in 2008, with 183 boats participating.

Ornö has up until recently been a military protected area, with foreigners not being allowed on or near the island. Because of this, the island is unknown abroad and the number of visiting tourists has been low. As of 1 April 1997, foreign citizens are allowed access to almost all parts of the island. There are however still places where you are not allowed to step ashore, drop anchor, dive or take pictures. Signs are posted where such rules are in effect.

The Swedish Sea Rescue Society rescue cruiser Queen Silvia is stationed in Kyrkviken. The crew is made up of volunteers living on the island.

Ornö church was designed by the architect Pehr Ulrik Stenhammar. It is situated on an elevation above Kyrkviken (church cove) and is a part of the Dalarö-Ornö-Utö congregation.

== See also ==
- Stockholm Archipelago Trail
