= Stockholm Archipelago Trail =

Hiking trail network in Sweden

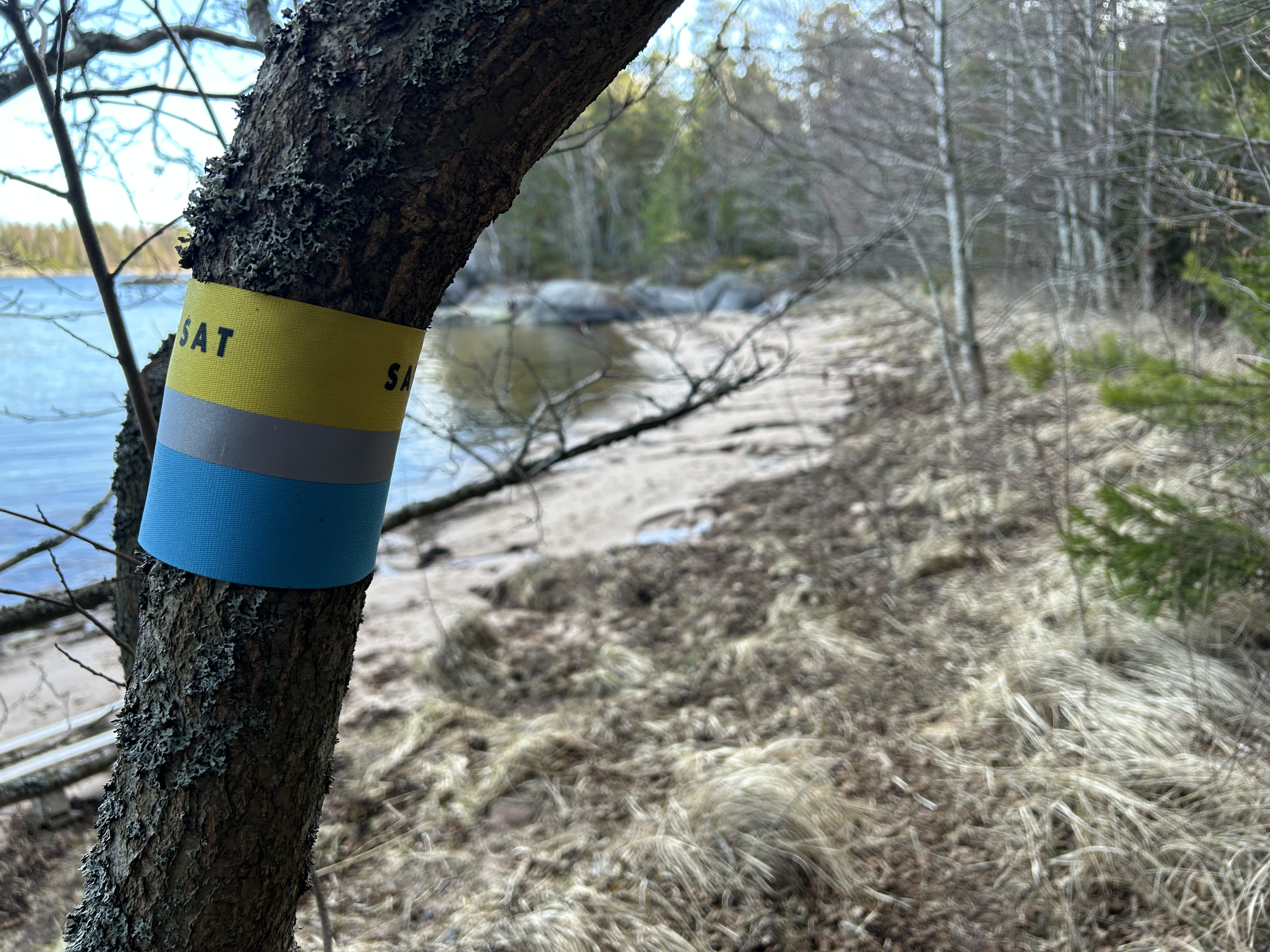
- A trail sign on the route.
- Length: 270 kilometres (170 mi) approximately
- Location: Stockholm Archipelago, Sweden
- Established: 2024
- Use: Hiking
- Season: Summer to early fall

The Stockholm Archipelago Trail is a hiking path network spanning approximately 270 kilometers (170 miles) across 20 islands of the Stockholm Archipelago in Sweden. The trail stretches from Arholma in the north to Landsort in the south. Each trail is marked as "easy," "average," or "challenging."

Opening in 2024, the trail quickly gained international recognition, including from National Geographic magazine, naming it one of the world's 25 best destinations for 2025.

The Stockholm Archipelago consists of more than 30,000 islands, making it one of the largest archipelagos in the world. The trail manages visitor flows on the islands, preserving the archipelago's fragile ecosystem and promoting sustainable tourism. It also highlights the region's cultural heritage and aims to foster settlement in the archipelago.

Hikers can tailor their experience to their preferences, camping at designated sites or staying at hotels and inns along the trail. However, the availability of accommodations and restaurants varies seasonally, as many facilities operate only during peak summer weeks. Ferry services are also seasonal, changing schedules through the year. As a result, inter-island travel requires careful planning, especially outside the summer season. These factors make the challenge of hiking vary on the time of year.

== Sections ==
The Stockholm Archipelago Trail is marked in red on the map.

Trail sections in Stockholm Archipelago. Zoom in for more details Difficulties: challenging average easy

- A Arholma – average - SAT
- B Lidö – average - SAT
- C Furusund – easy - SAT
- D Yxlan – average - SAT
- E Finnhamn – average - SAT
- F Ingmarsö – easy - SAT
- G Brottö – easy - SAT
- H Svartsö – easy - SAT
- I Möja – easy - SAT
- J Grinda – average - SAT
- K Sandhamn – easy - SAT
- L Runmarö – average - SAT
- M Nämdö – average - SAT
- N Ornö – average - SAT
- O Fjärdlång – average - SAT
- P Utö – challenging - SAT
- Q Rånö – easy - SAT
- R Ålö – challenging - SAT
- S Nåttarö – challenging - SAT
- T Landsort – average - SAT

=== Båtluffarleden ===
You have a trail "Båtluffarleden" (solid blue on the map) that connects Ingmarsö and Finnhamn see instructions at stockholmarchipelagotrail.com and it also overlap Stockholm Archipelago Trail a some parts at Ingmarsö and Finnhamn.

=== Ferries ===
The easiest way to get out to the islands and between them is by Waxholmsbolaget's ferries. In the map above, some docks are marked in grey, showing where the ferries depart to the islands. On the islands themselves, the map shows the various ferry stops where hikes can begin.

	Ferries	Sections
a	Simpnäs	Arholma
b	Räfsnäs	Lidö
c	Åsättra	Svartsö, Ingmarsö, Finnhamn
d	Sollenkroka	Möja
e	Boda	Grinda
f	Stavsnäs	Runmarö, Sandhamn, Nämdö
g	Dalarö	Ornö, Fjärdlång, Gruvbryggan Utö
h	Årsta	Utö
i	Nynäshamn	Nåttarö Rånö Ålö
j	Ankarudden	Landsort

=== Discover the Trail: Where to Eat, Stay, and Explore ===
A map featuring some of the museums along the trail, as well as points of interest such as drinking water sources, accommodations, food options, ferry stops, lighthouses, camping sites, and bakeries.

Stockholm Archipelago Trail displayed as a black line

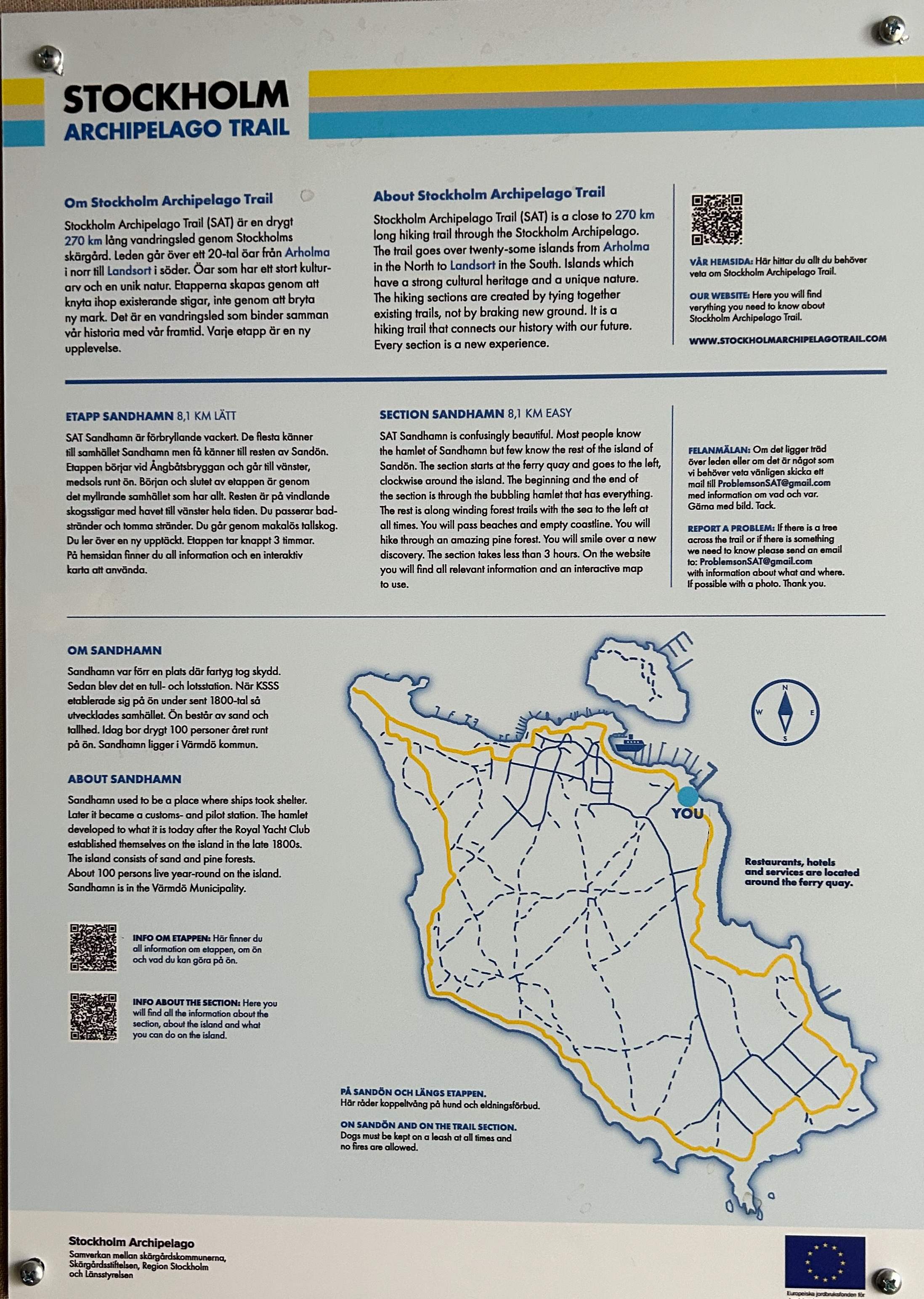
SAT Sandhamn

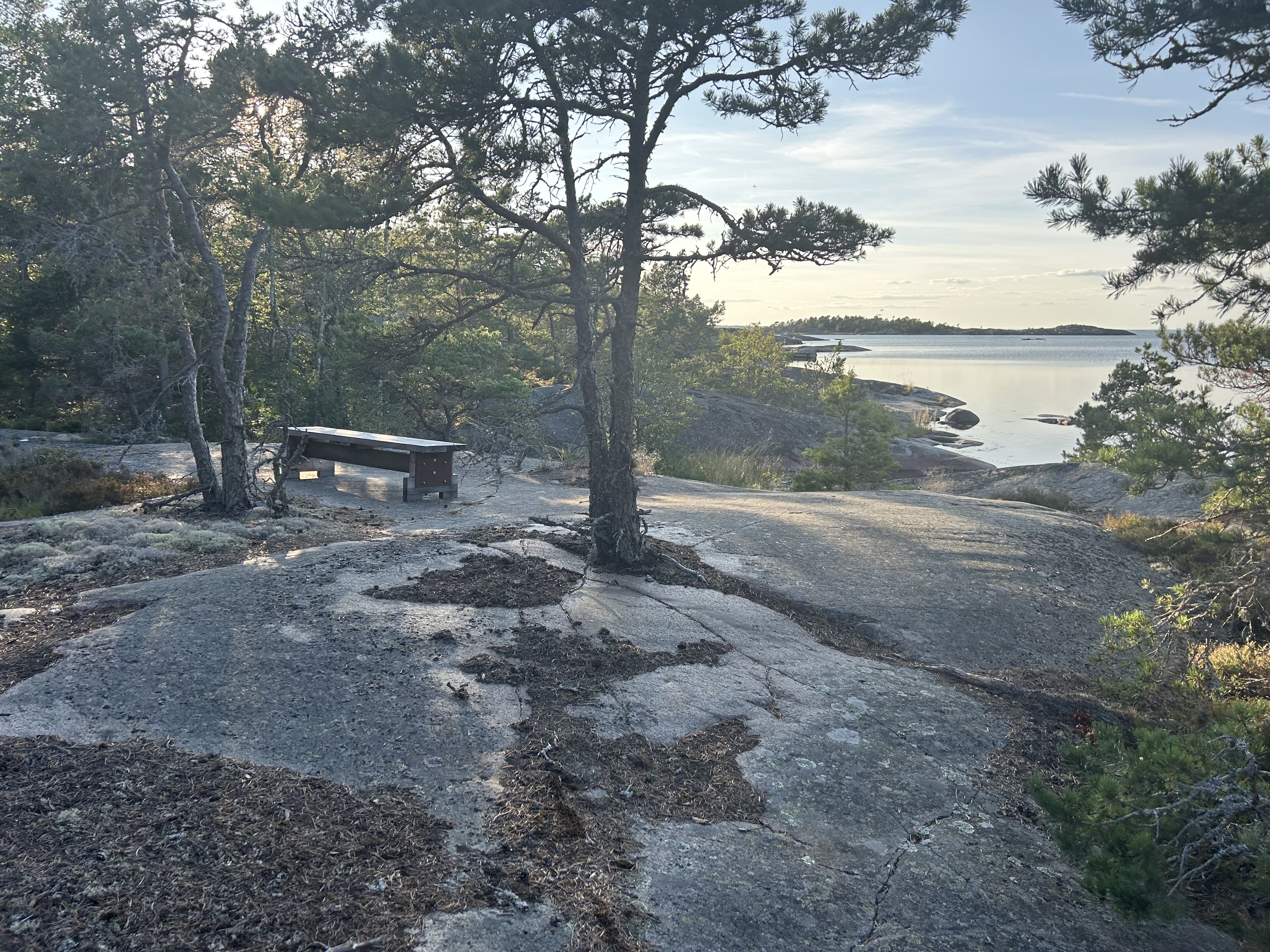
SAT Arholma

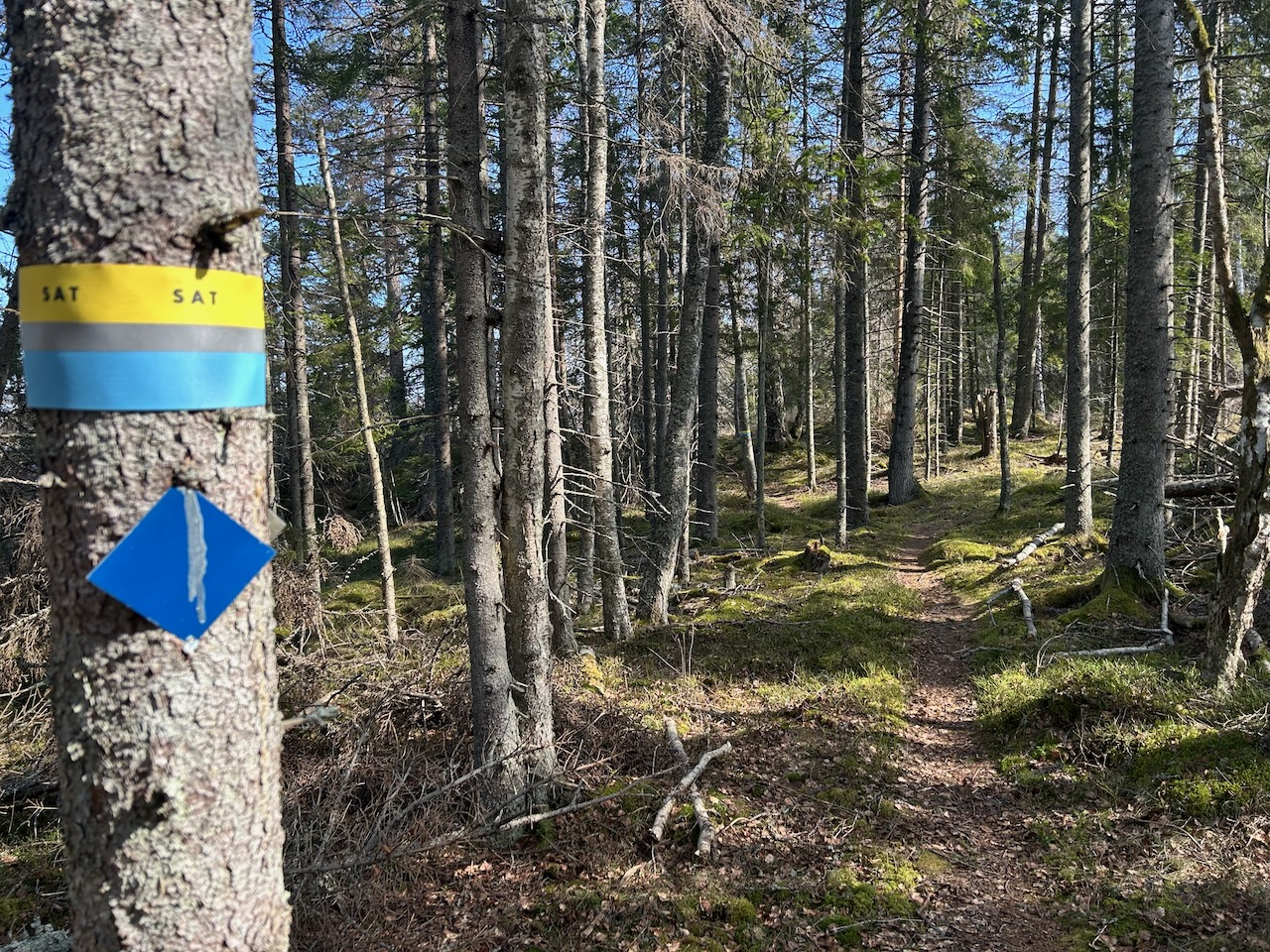
SAT Lidö

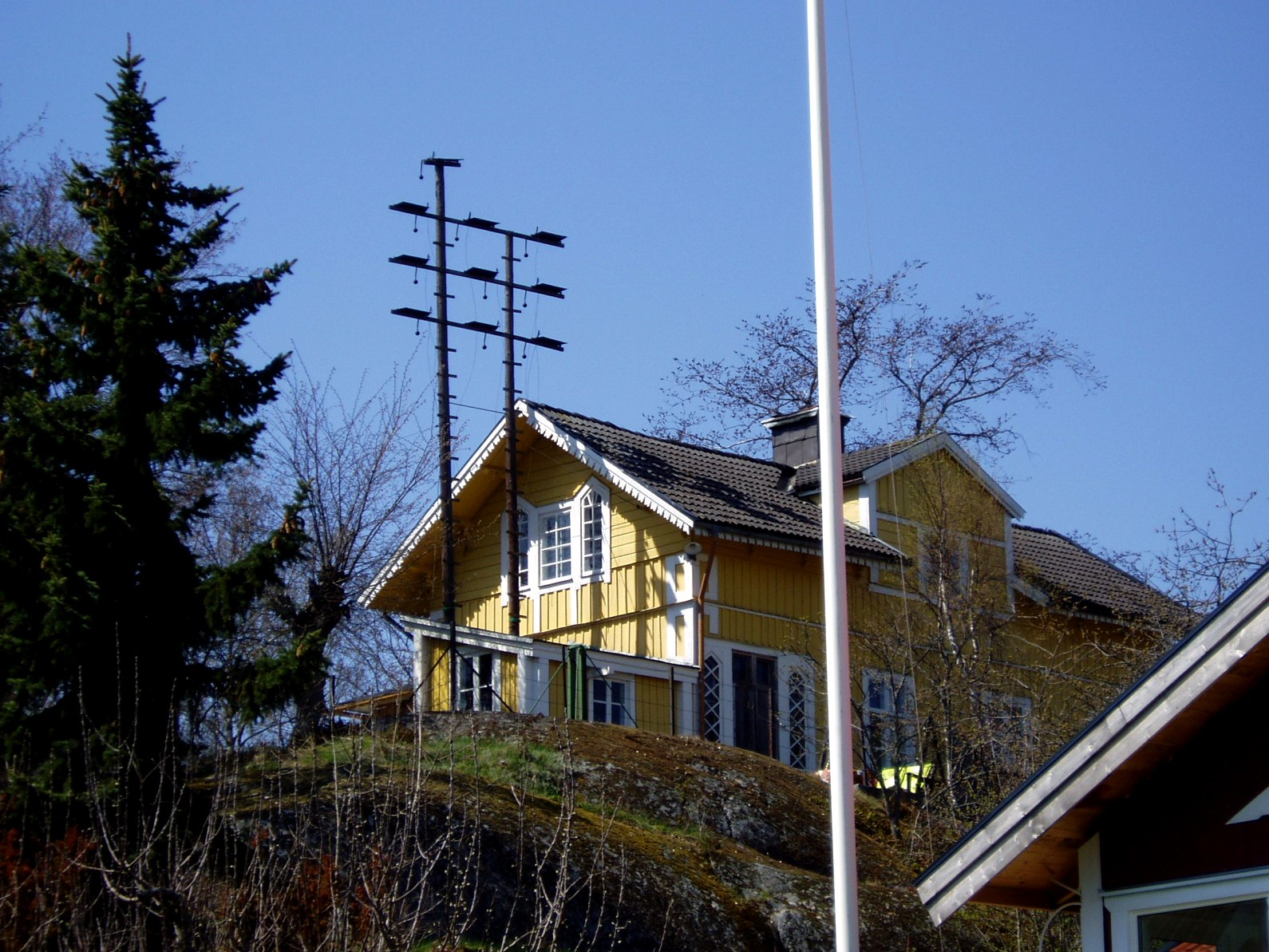
SAT Furusund a optical Telegraph

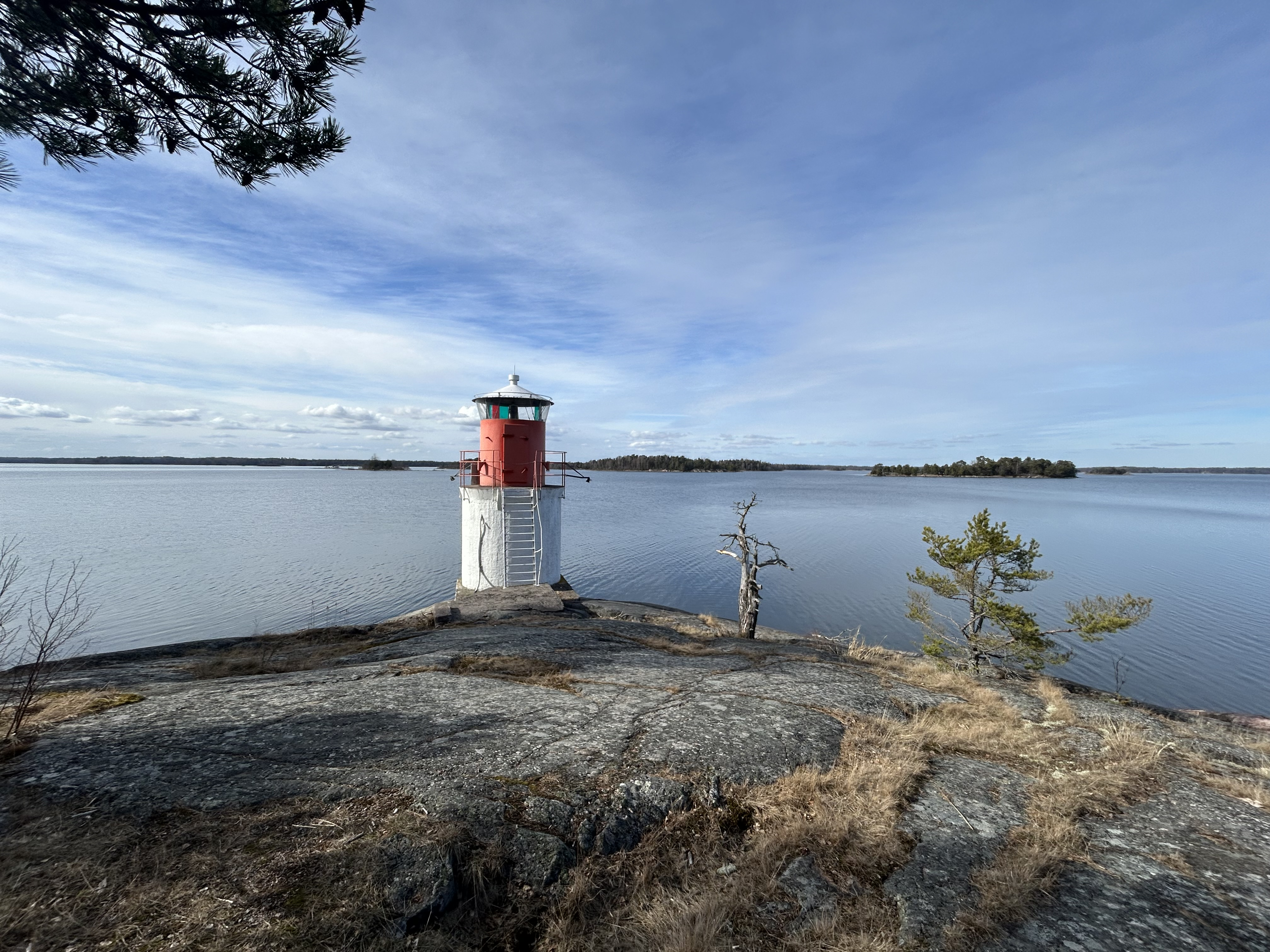
SAT Yxlan

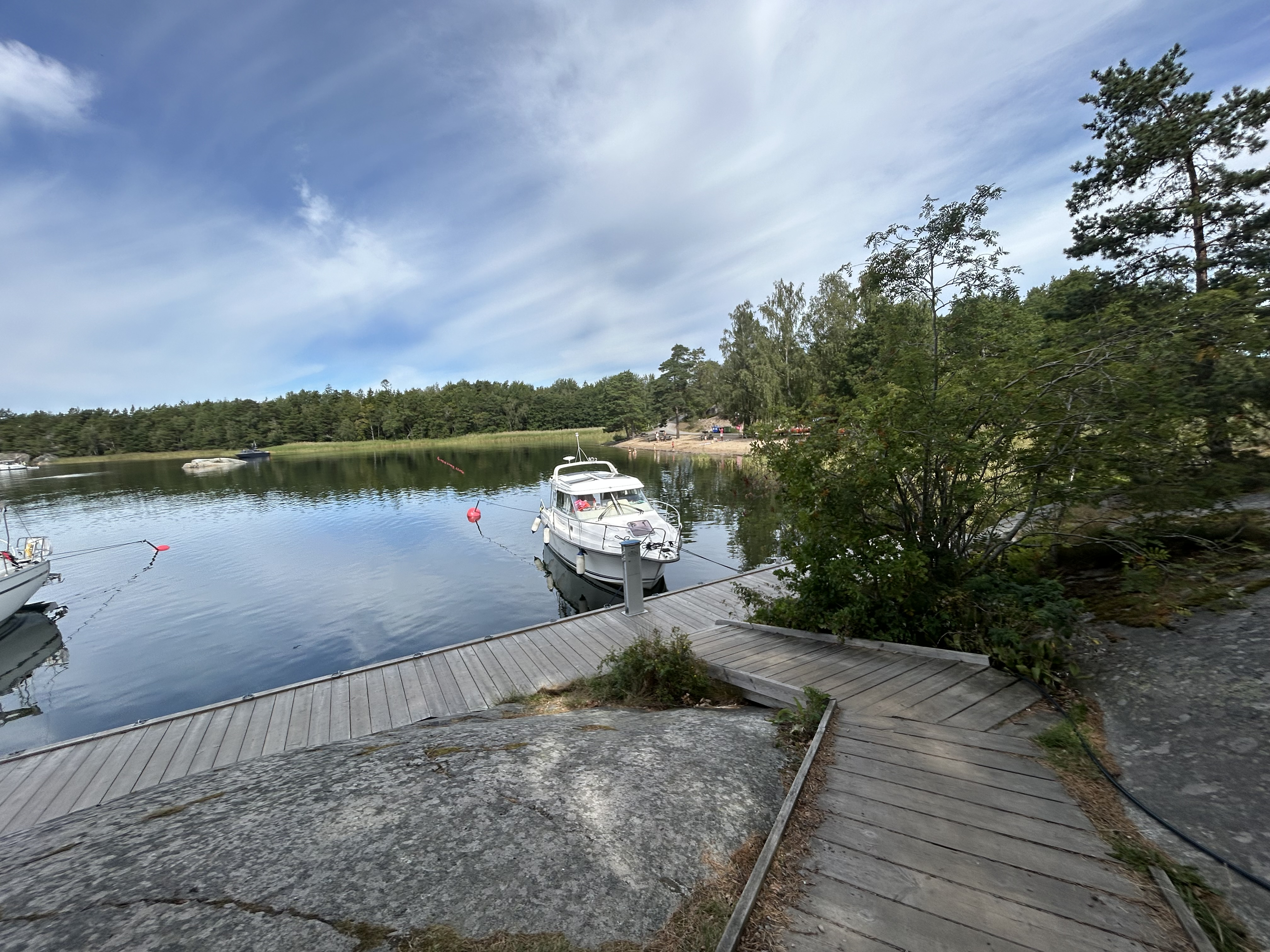
SAT Finnhamn

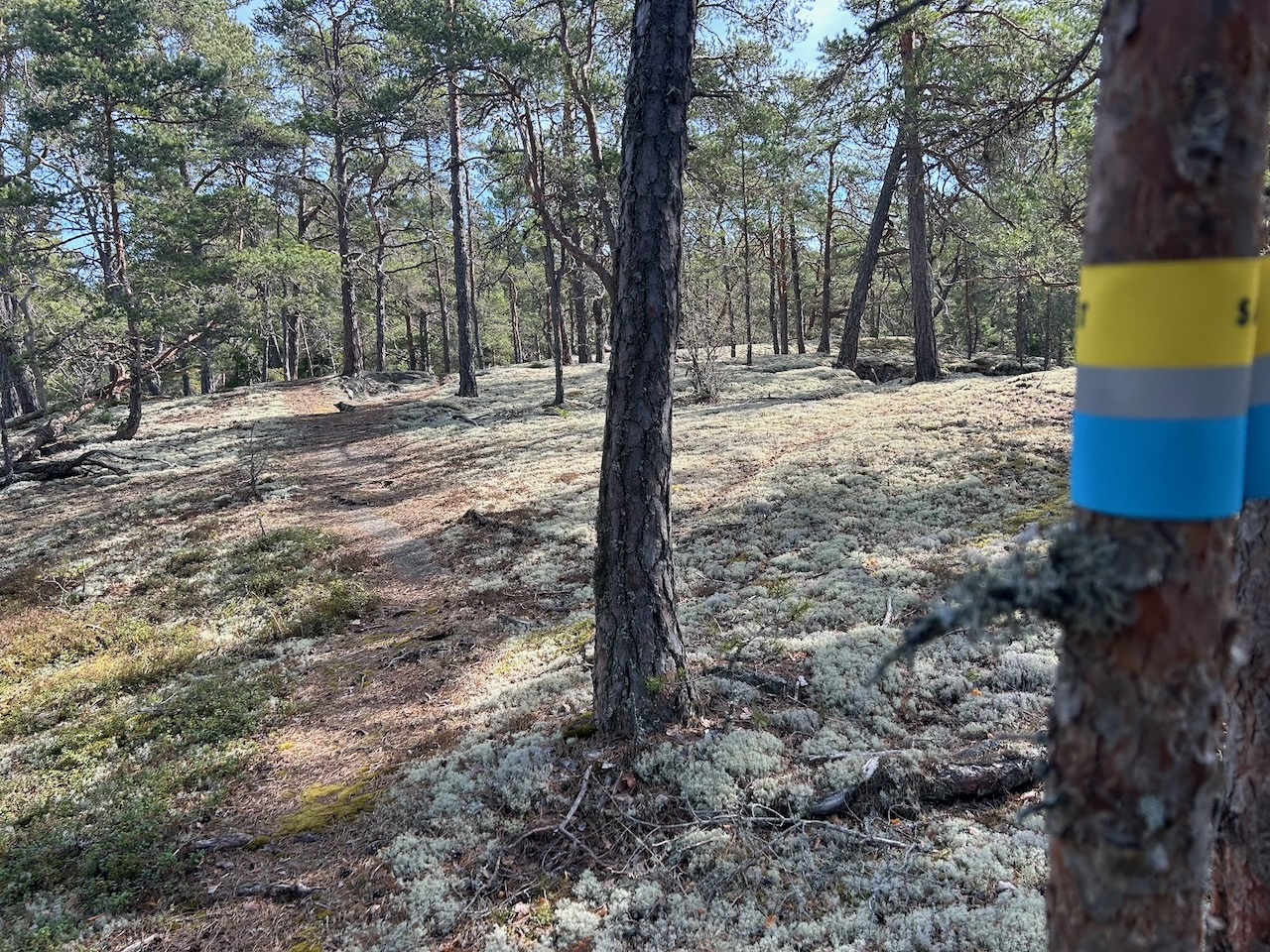
SAT Ingmarsö

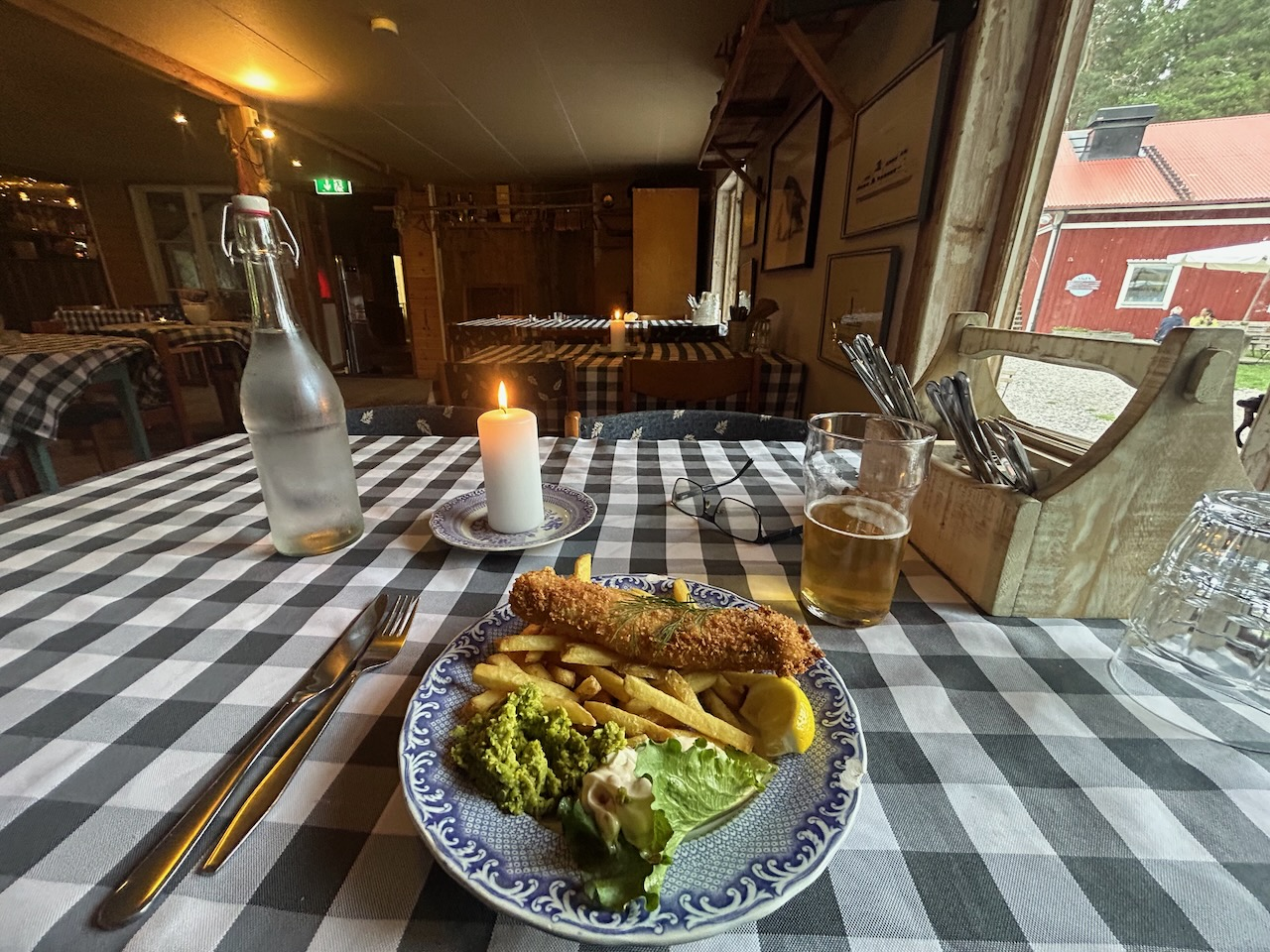
SAT Svartsö - Bistro Sågen

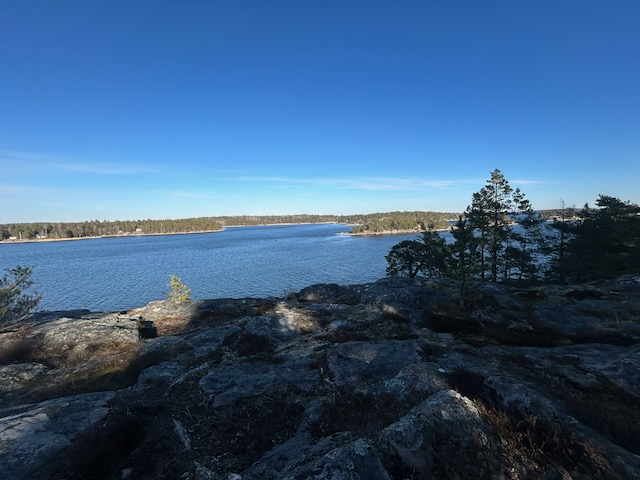
SAT Grinda

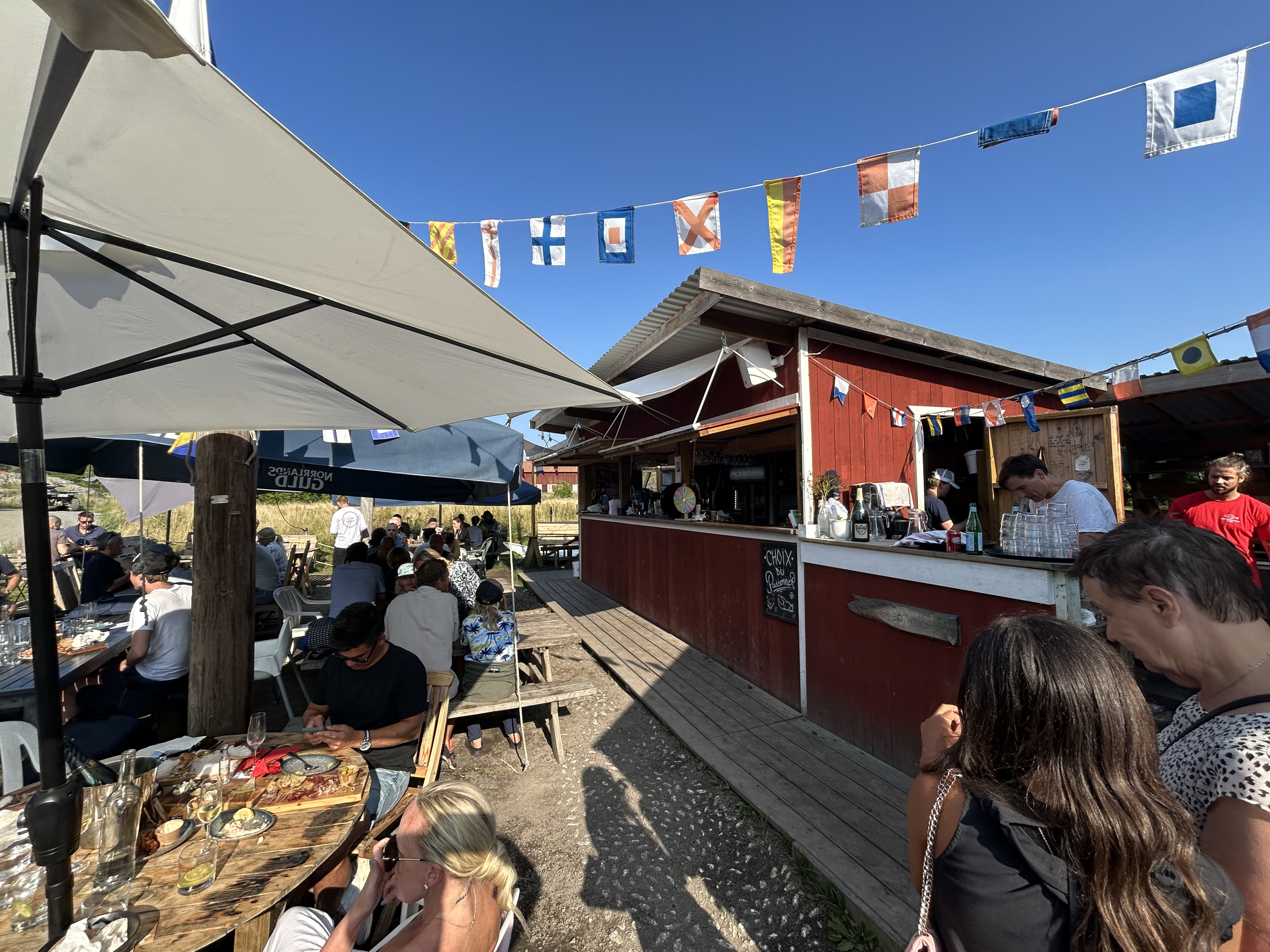
SAT Möja - the outdoor fish restaurant

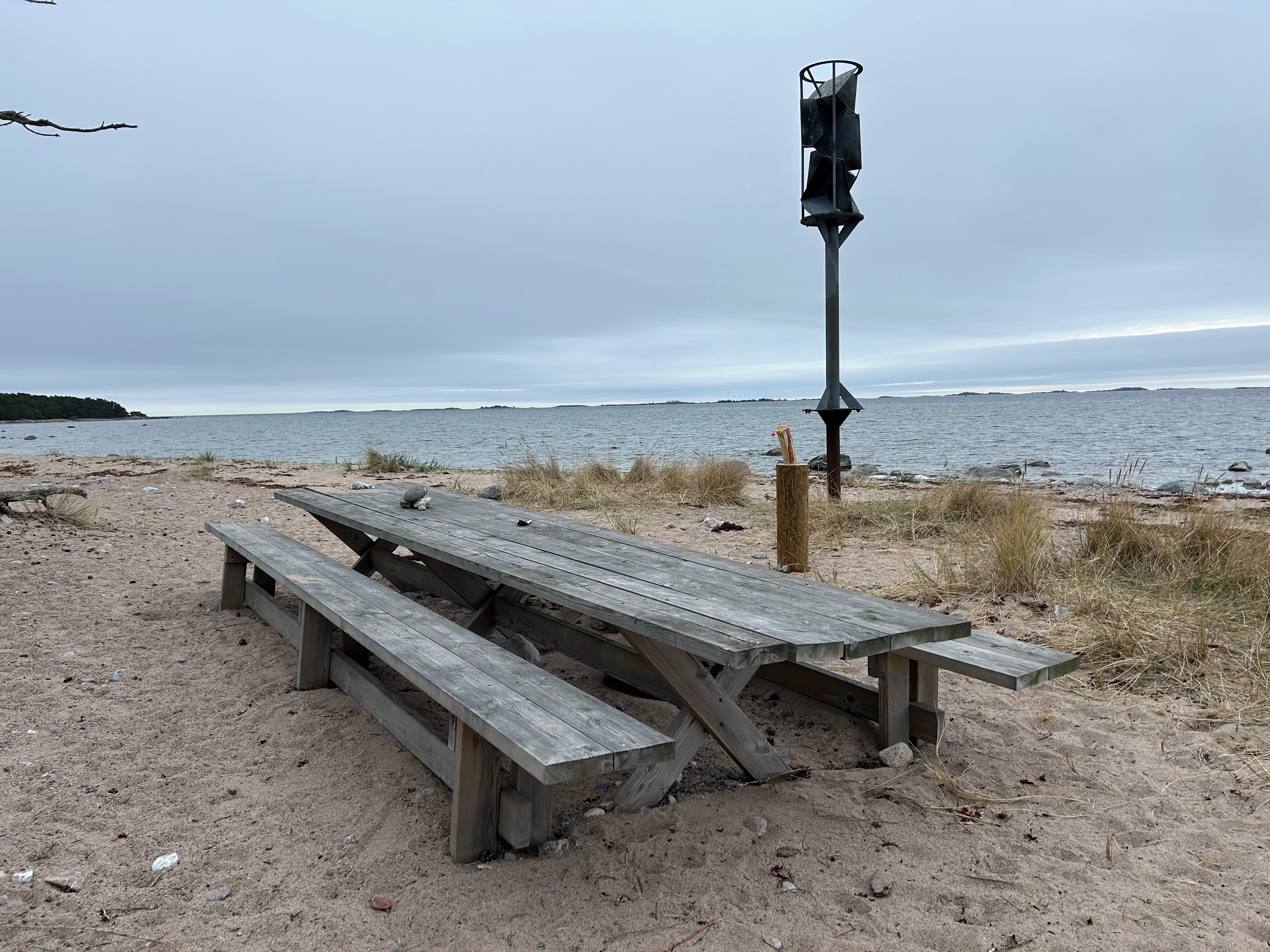
SAT Sandhamn

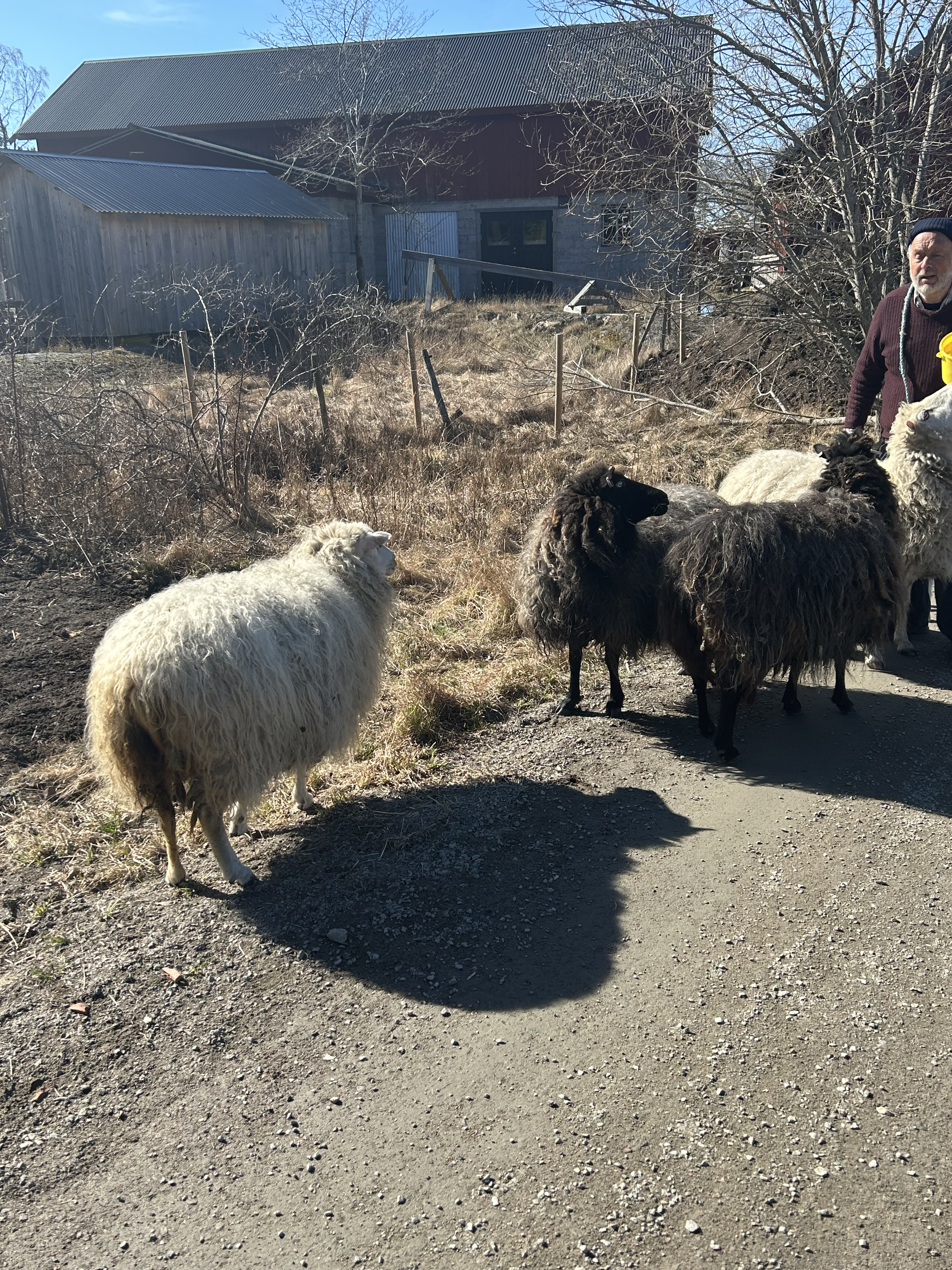
SAT Runmarö

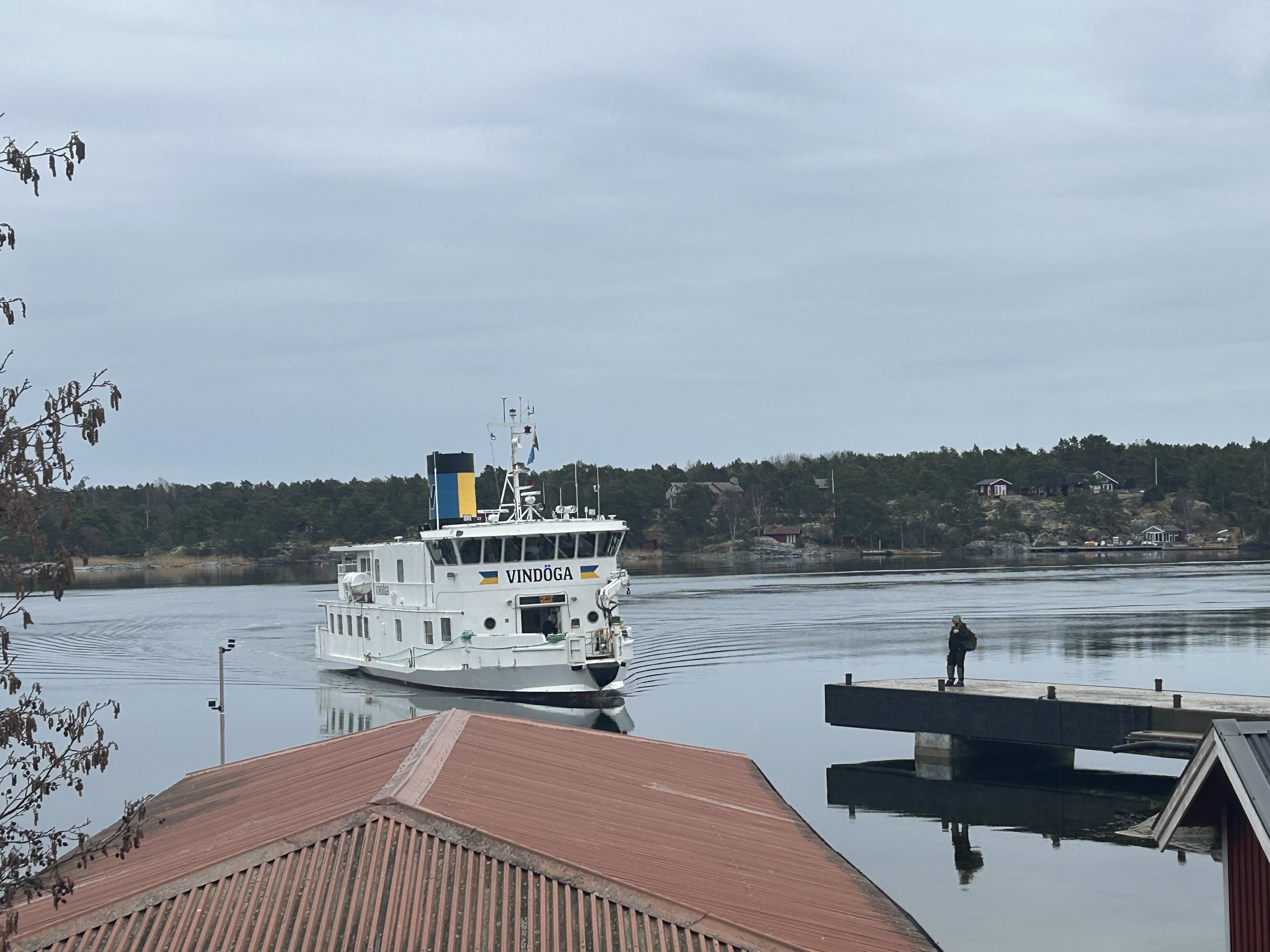
SAT Nämdö - The Waxholms ferry

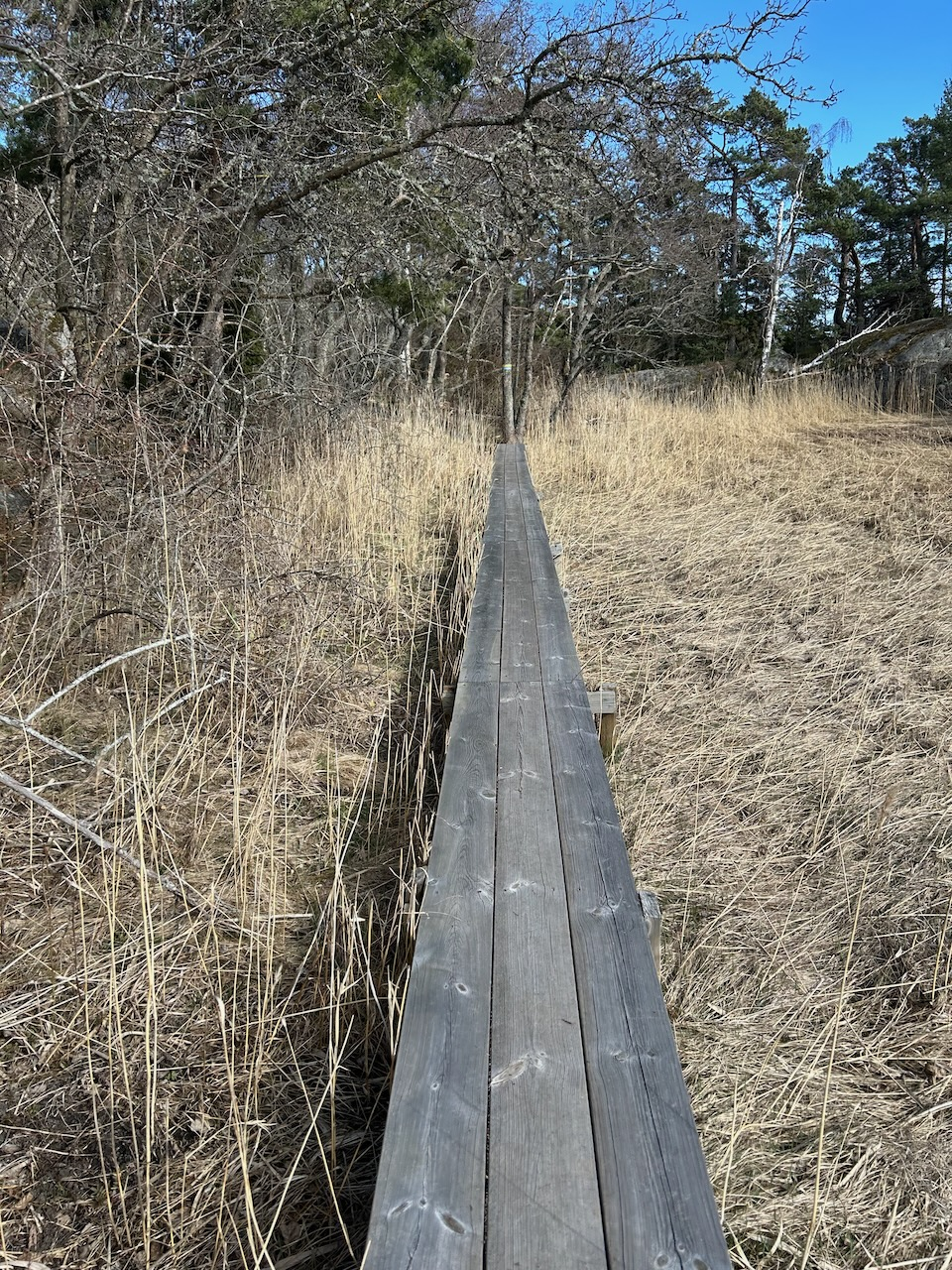
SAT Utö

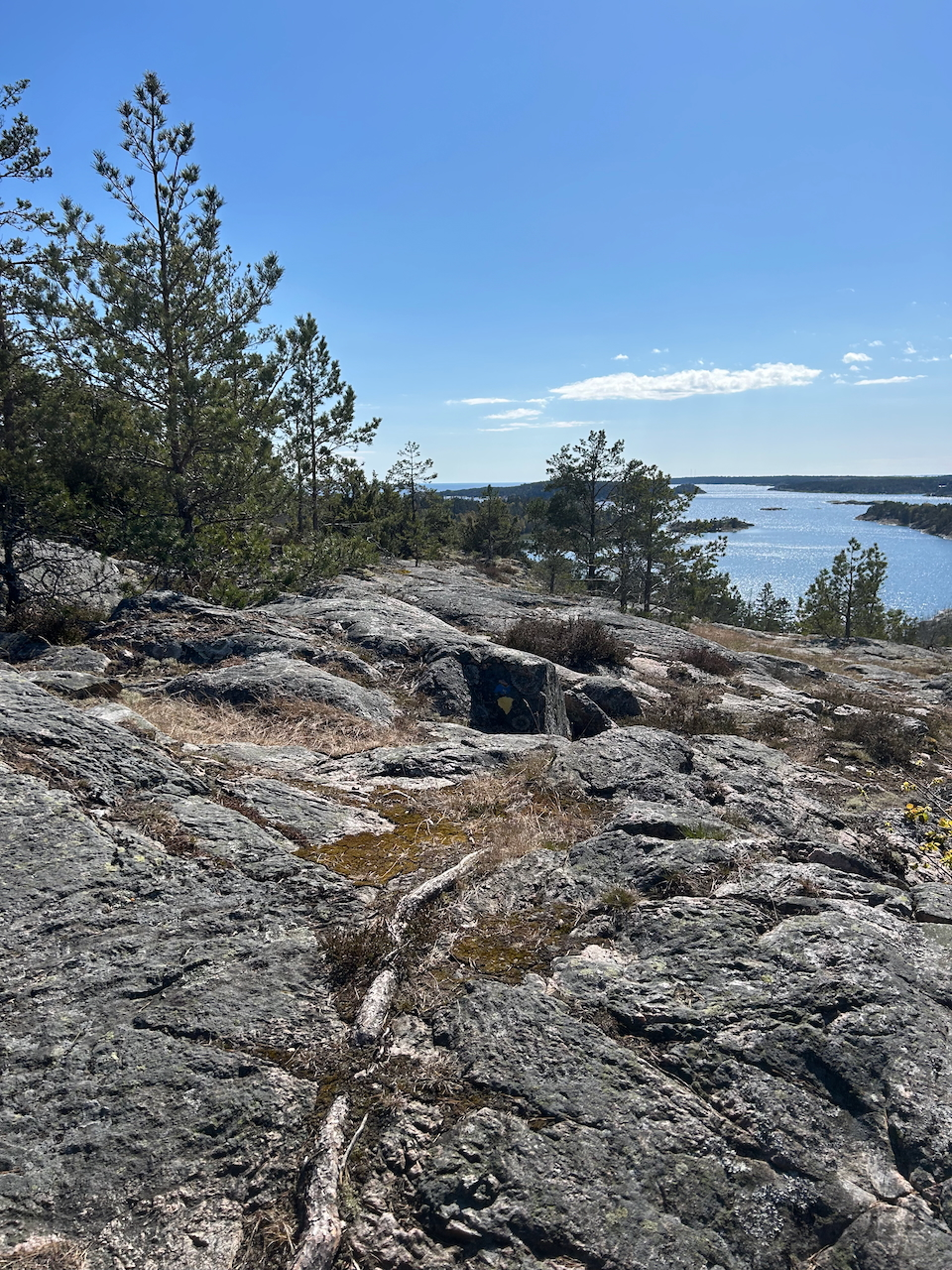
SAT Ålö

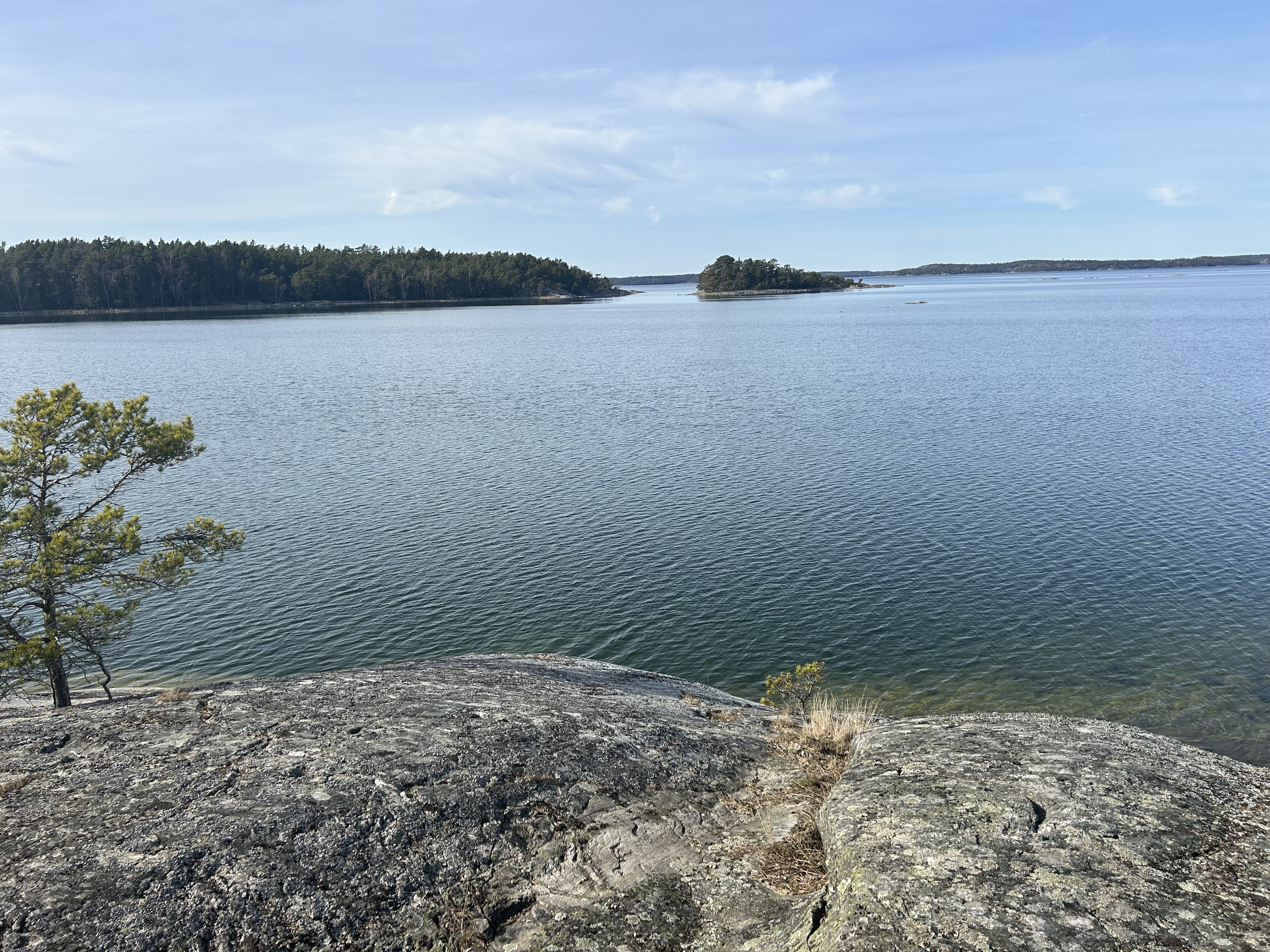
SAT Rånö

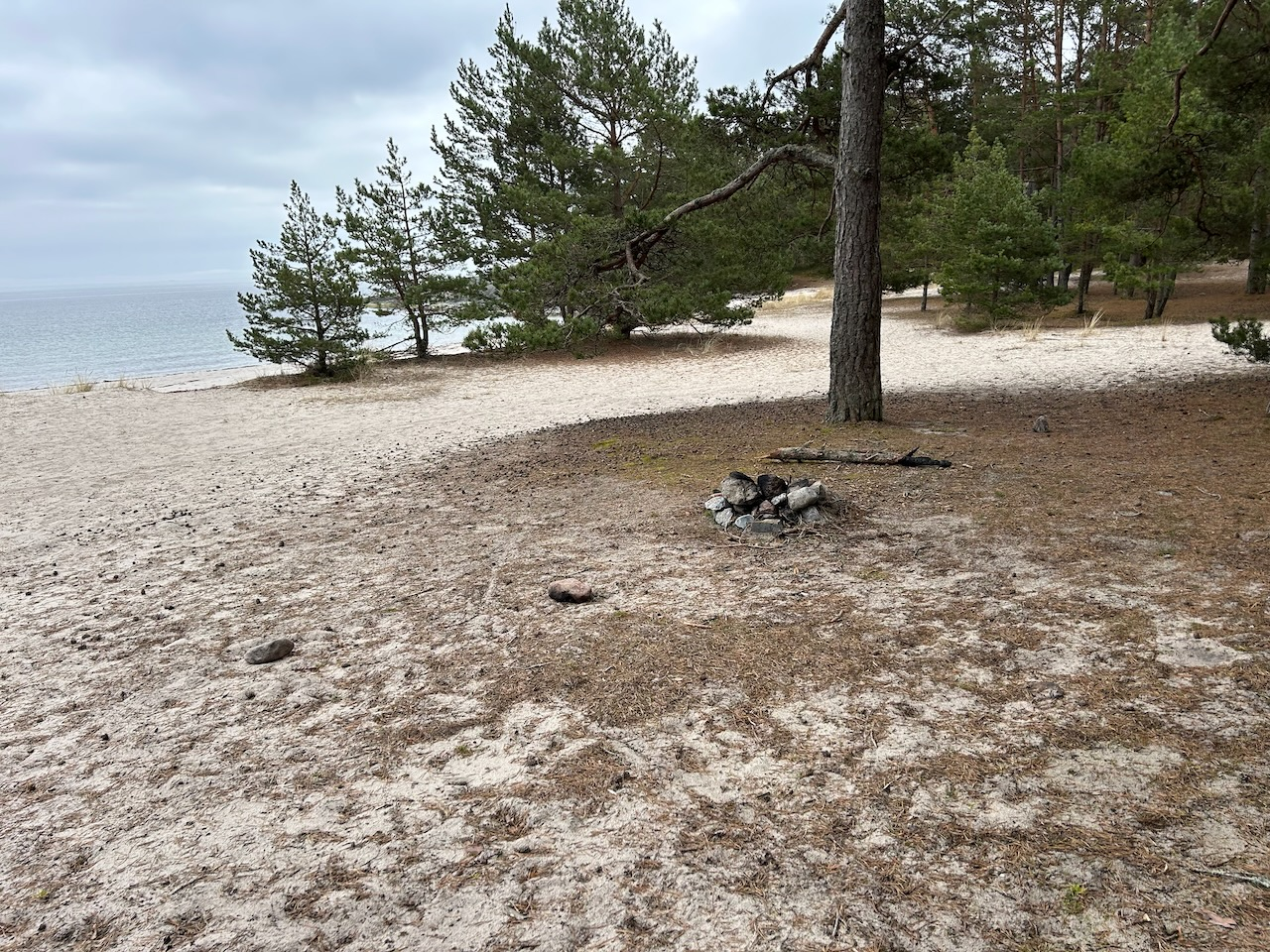
SAT Nåttarö

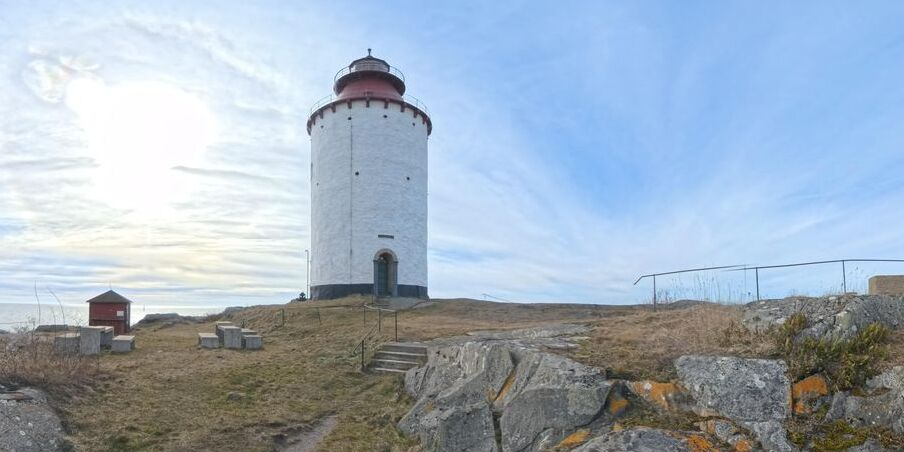
SAT Landsort

== See also ==
- Freedom to roam - allemansrätten
