= Blidö =

Coordinates: 59°36′N 18°54′E

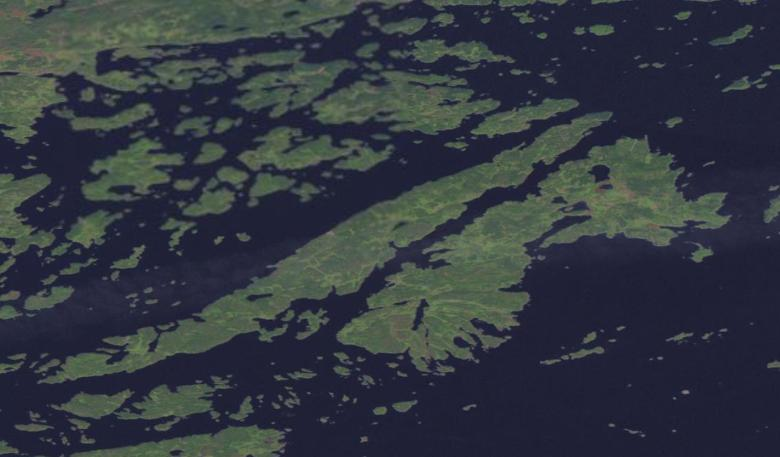
Blidö.

Blidö is an island in the northern Stockholm Archipelago "roslagen" and a part of the Norrtälje Municipality. Its northernmost point is called Kråknäset. There is a car ferry to neighboring Yxlan and ferries to Stockholm, as well as an ICA grocery store.

Linkudden Nature Reserve is located on the southeast of the island with lovely nature and seaside cliffs.

Journalist and author Ture Nerman owned a summer house on Blidö from 1919 until 1969. Author Tove Jansson spent her summers as a child on Blidö.
