= Yxlan =

Island in Norrtälje Municipality, Sweden

Coordinates: 59°37′N 18°51′E

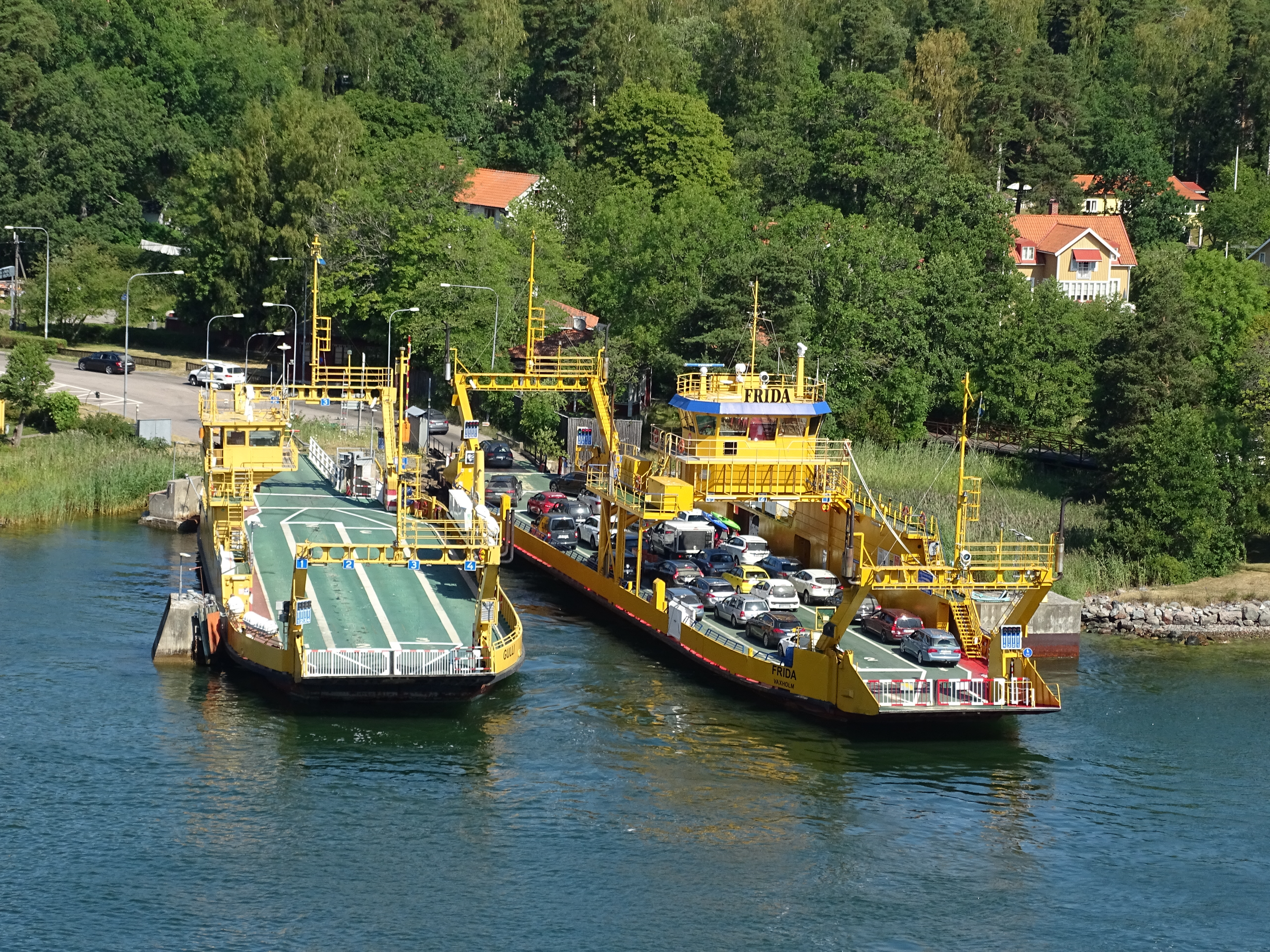
The Yxlan-Furusund ferry

Yxlan is an island in the north of Stockholm archipelago and Norrtälje municipality. The island is reachable from the mainland by car ferries. Yxlan is located between the islands of Furusund and Blidö. There is a school and a little store on the island, other services are found on Blidö.

== See also ==
- Stockholm Archipelago Trail
