= Ingmarsö =

Island in Österåker Municipality, Sweden

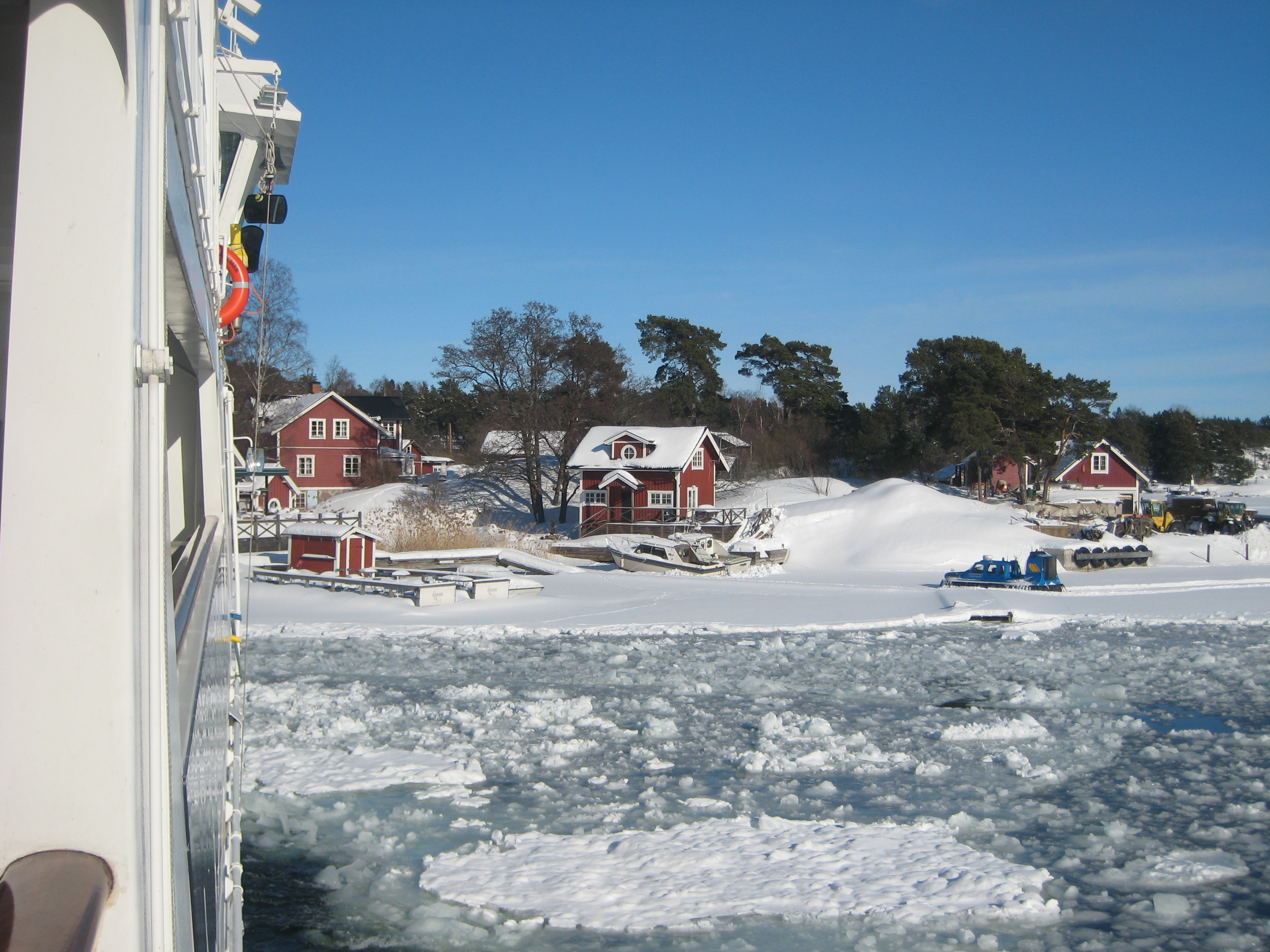
- Ingmarsö in March 2010
- Interactive map of Ingmarsö

Geography
- Location: Stockholm archipelago, Baltic Sea
- Coordinates: 59°28.5′N 18°46′E
- Area: 5.96 km^{2} (2.30 sq mi)

Administration
- Sweden
- County: Stockholm
- Municipality: Österåker

Demographics
- Population: 159 (2008)

Ingmarsö is an island located in the Stockholm archipelago in Sweden. The westernmost part of Ingmarsö consists of the Brottö peninsula.

Today, Ingmarsö has around 150 permanent residents and around thirty companies, including a boatyard, restaurant, shop with pharmacy, system and postal agents, home bakery, carpenters and other entrepreneurs.

The island has no road connection with the mainland, but is serviced by Waxholmsbolaget and boat taxis to two regular jetties: Ingmarsö Södra and Ingmarsö Norra.

== See also ==
- Stockholm Archipelago Trail
