= Svartsö =

Swedish Island

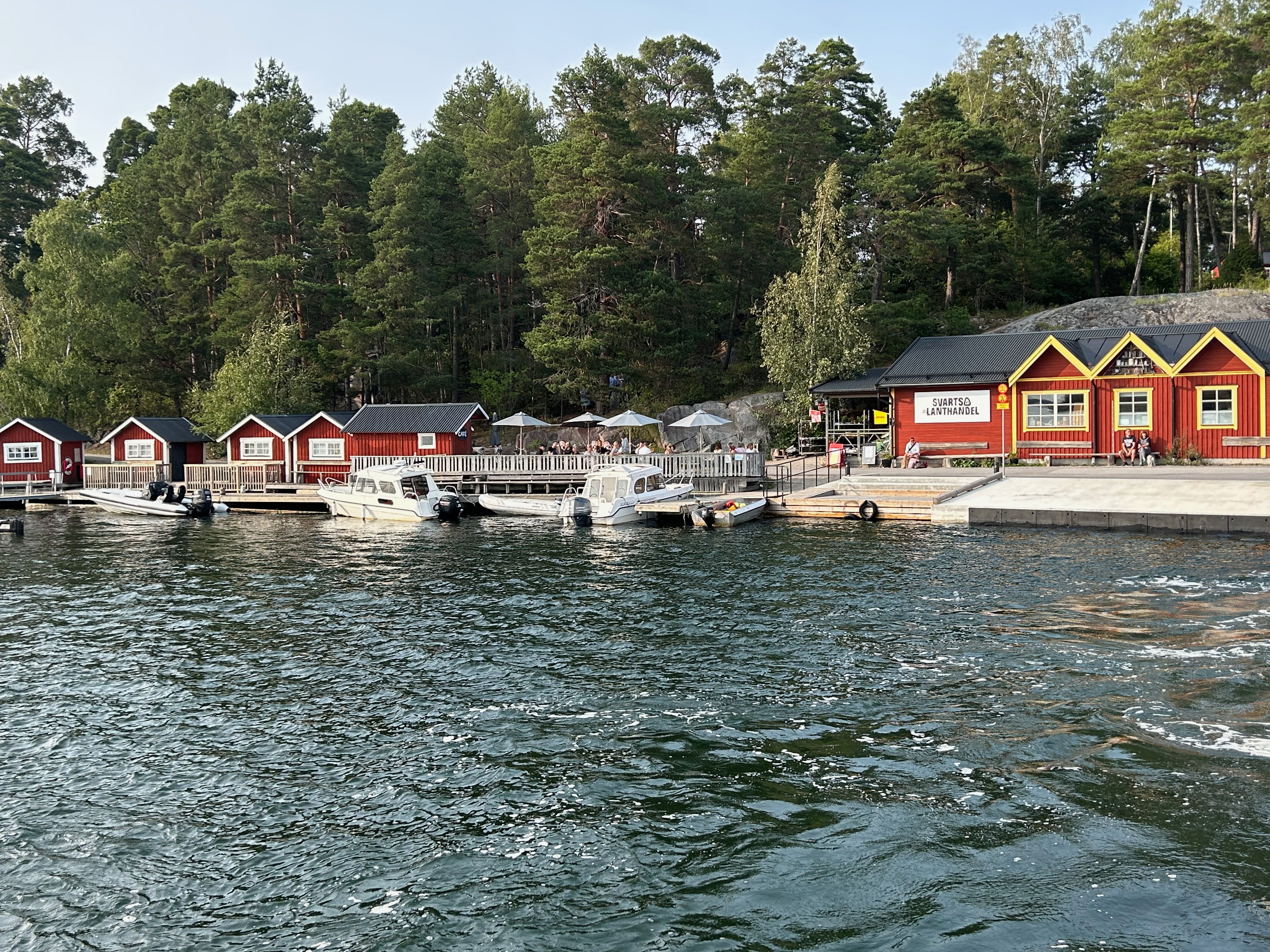
- Svartsö in July 2009
- Interactive map of Svartsö

Geography
- Location: Baltic Sea
- Coordinates: 59°27′N 18°41′E
- Area: 7.01 km^{2} (2.71 sq mi)

Administration
- Sweden
- County: Stockholm
- Municipality: Värmdö

Demographics
- Population: 70 (2021)

Additional information
- Official website: https://svartso.se

Svartsö is an island located in the Stockholm archipelago in Värmdö Municipality in Sweden. In the summer the island is a popular destination for visitors. The landscape is relatively flat and there are several small lakes located on the island.

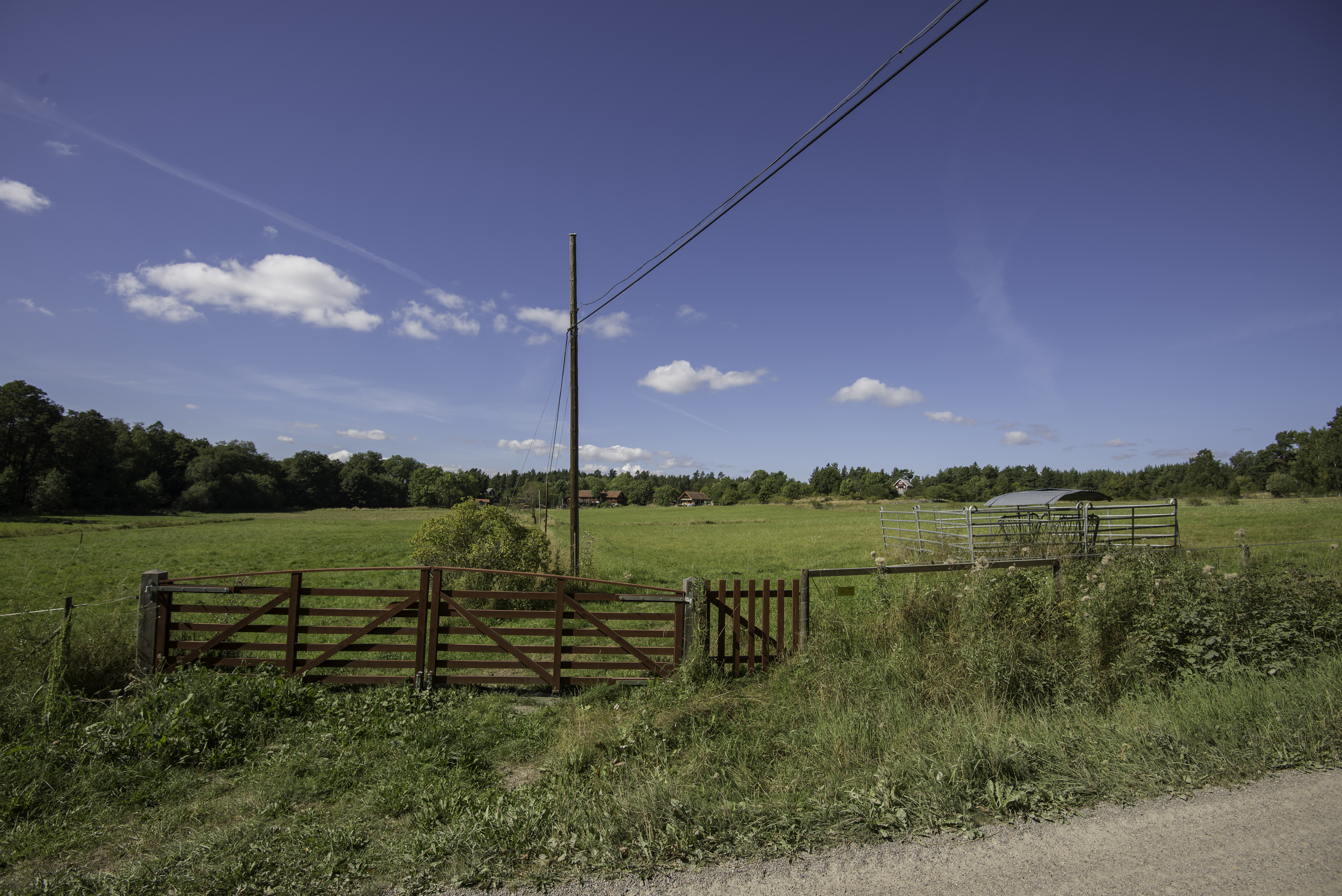
Svartsö

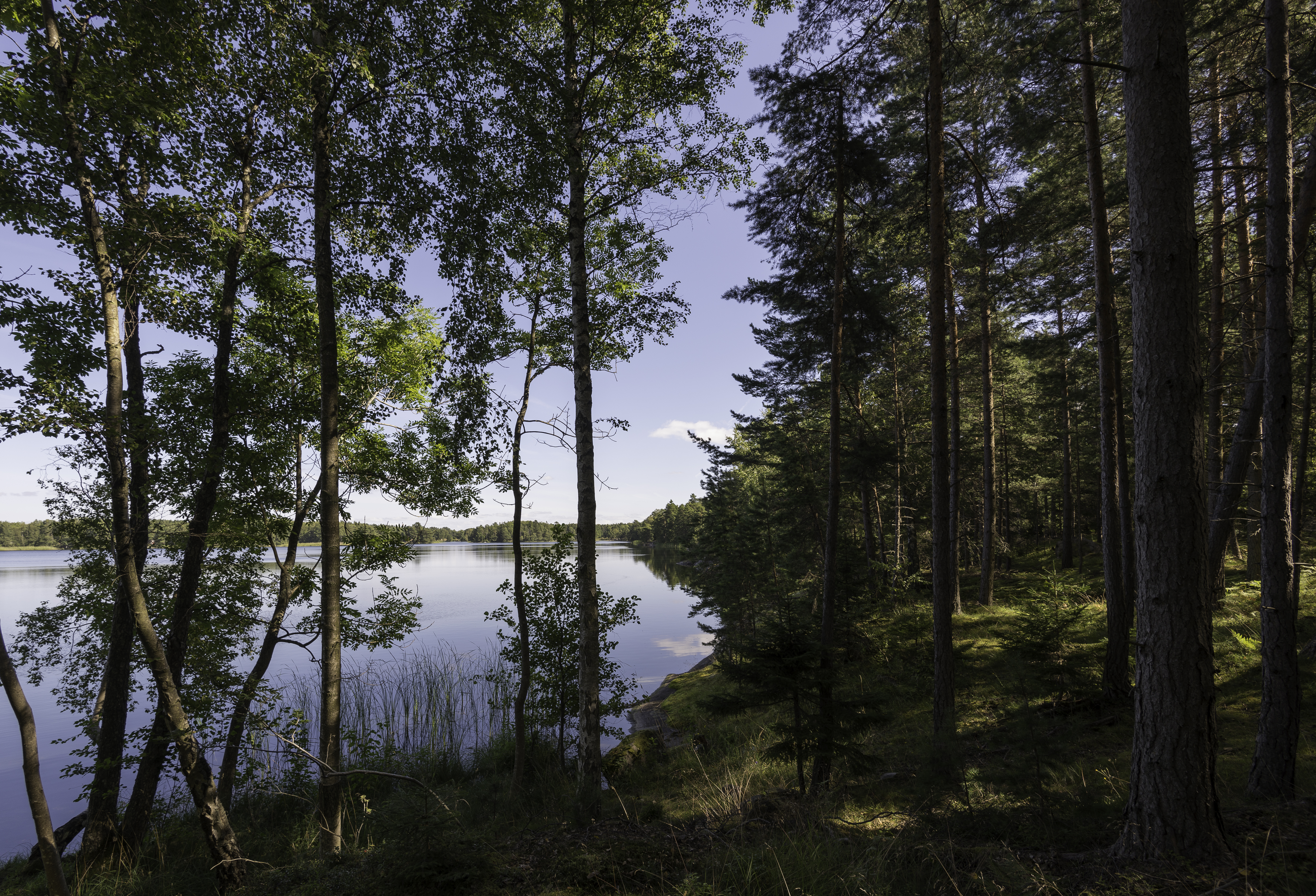
Storträsk is the largest of the lakes on the island

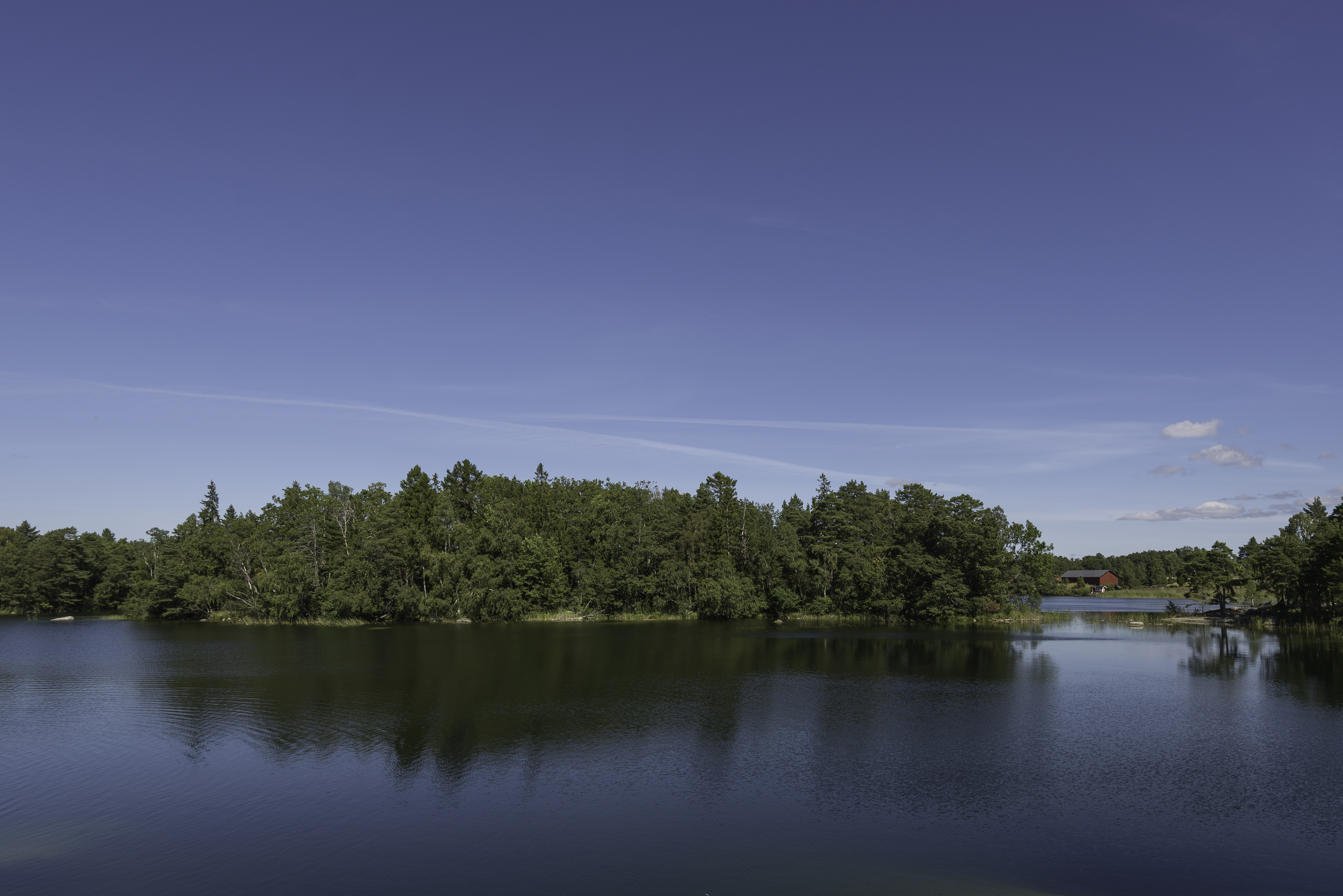
The small island Boholmen in the lake Storträsk

== Nature ==
Svartsö has a very varied nature. Here there are both large forests and open pastures and meadows. The forest on the island is quite typical of the islands in this part of the archipelago. Here there are both old spruce forest and younger mixed forest. On the ground you can find blueberries, lingonberries, heather, lily of the valley, orchids and mushrooms. The island has five small lakes, the largest of which, Storträsket, also has an island. The island called Boholmen has its own history. It was here that the population of Svartsö fled during the Russian ravages in 1719. Here they buried their possessions to hide them from the Russians. According to legend, a curse will befall whoever tries to look for the hidden possessions. In the largest lakes you can see beavers.

== Transport ==
Svartsö is serviced by Waxholmsbolaget all year round to four jetties: Alsvik, Skälvik, Söderboudd and Norra Svartsö.

== See also ==
- Stockholm Archipelago Trail
