= Odelberg =

Odelberg is a surname. Notable people with the surname include:

- Axel Odelberg (1873-1950), Swedish chemical engineer
- Jesper Odelberg, Swedish comedian
- Victor Odelberg
