= Josef Ekberg =

Swedish designer

Josef Alfred Ekberg
- Born: 18 February 1877; Värmdö, Sweden
- Died: 7 December 1945 (aged 68); Gustavsberg, Sweden
- Occupation(s): Ceramist, artistic director
- Movement: Swedish Grace, Art Nouveau, art deco
- Spouse: Elsa Augusta Pettersson

Josef Ekberg (February 18, 1877 – December 7, 1945) was a Swedish designer who worked at the Gustavsberg Porcelain Factory from 1889 to 1917. He is known for his contributions to the Swedish Grace art movement.

Ekberg was born in Värmdö, Sweden. At age twelve, Ekberg began working in the Gustavsberg Porcelain Factory, where his father Bernhard had worked as a painter. He started out as a helper in the factory and eventually progressed to the post of a painter. His earliest works were wall decorations and bread dishes that featured simple landscape motifs.

Ekberg befriended his mentor Gunnar Wennerberg during his time in Gustavsberg. In 1898, the two successfully developed a modern take on the sgraffito technique, which involves applying two layers of contrasting glaze to an unfired piece and then carefully carving designs into the surface to reveal the inner layer. The resulting work would then have a finishing glaze applied before being fired. Several of Ekberg's works were shown at the World Exhibition in Paris in 1900. This caught the attention and admiration of factory owner Wilhelm Odelberg, who decided to have the factory mass-produce sgraffito-decorated pottery. Most of Ekberg's pottery was decorated using either the sgraffito technique or with a luster glaze. His designs usually included vines, flowers, and other organic imagery.

In 1908, Wennerberg left Gustavsberg and Ekberg became the lead artistic director and ceramic designer. His works were displayed at the Stockholm Exhibition of 1909 and in the Swedish industrial pavilion at the Baltic Exhibition of 1914 in Malmö. He held his role until 1917, when he stepped down and appointed Wilhelm Kåge the position. Kåge would go on to create some of his most notable ceramic works at Gustavsberg.

After Ekberg's death, a street was named in his honor. Josef Ekbergs Gränd (Josef Ekberg's Alley) is located near the current site of the Gustavsberg Porcelain Factory.

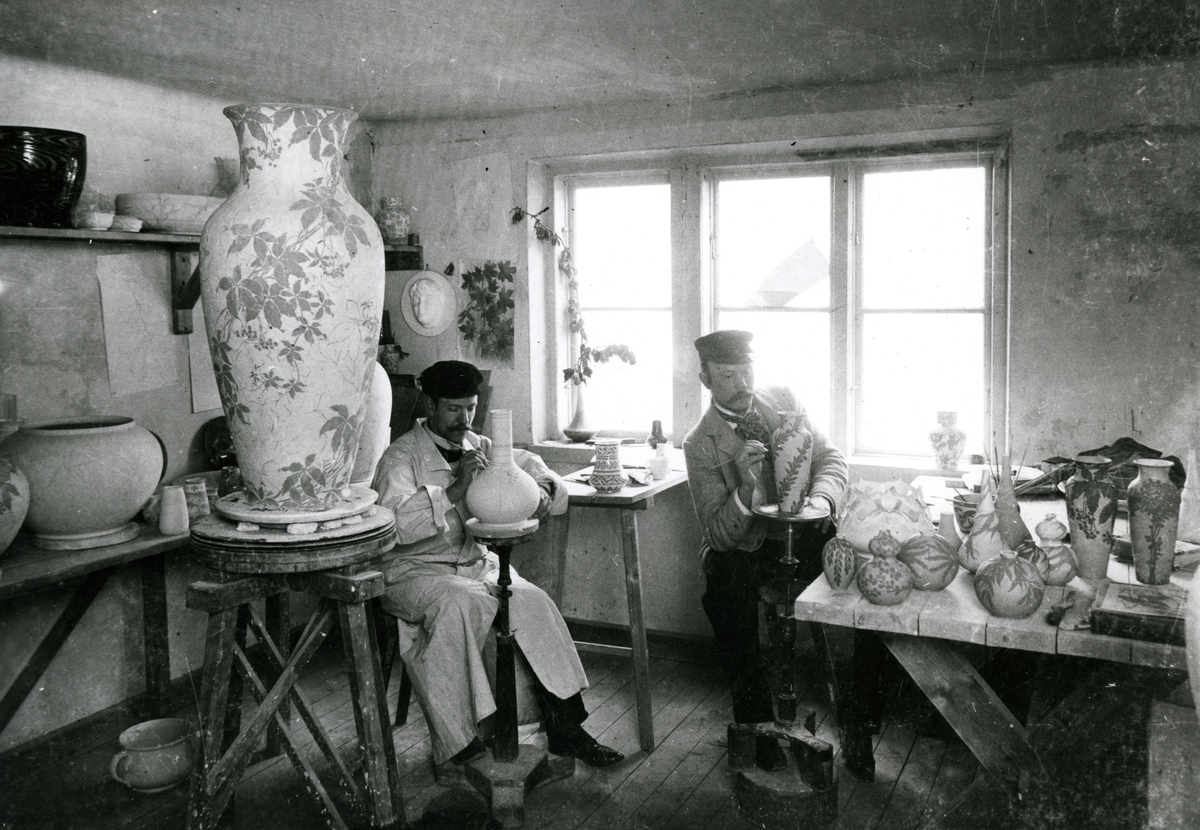
Ekberg and Gunnar Wennerberg working on vases, circa 1900.

== Personal life ==
Josef Ekberg married fellow artist Elsa Pettersson and remained in Gustavsberg until his death in 1945. They had two children, Iris and Börje.
