= Ernie Kim =

Asian-American ceramics artist

Ernie Kim (1918–1997) was an Asian-American ceramics artist. His work is in the collections on the Smithsonian American Art Museum and the Everson Museum of Art in Syracuse New York.

== Early life and education ==
Kim was born in Manteca, California. He attended Los Angeles City College (1940-1942) and had planned to become dentist.

== World War II ==
When United States entered World War II, Kim joined U.S. Army to serve as a Parachute Lieutenant at the Battle of the Bulge. Kim was the only survivor of his unit. He was captured and imprisoned at the German POW camp in Heppenheim where he received no medical care and very little food. When he was rescued, Kim weighed only 65 pounds and suffered from severe depression. He also has endured extreme isolation during his incarceration as a prisoner of war.

== Artist life ==
After the war, Kim attended occupational therapy through the Veterans Administration. He attended ceramics classes about which he said, “I realized I could serve myself and the community by becoming a ceramic artist.”

Kim was manager at Ceramic Craft Studio in Mt. View, California and became a ceramics teacher and taught Ceramics in the Palo Alto Unified School District in 1952. He served as the head of the ceramics department at the San Francisco Art Institute in 1956 and Director of the Richmond Art Center from 1970 to 1980.

As an artist, he was praised for creating “quietly beautiful” vessels featuring “subtle manipulation of surfaces”. He followed sgraffito and wax resist techniques to decorate his ceramics. It is noted that his work had an influence from the Swedish designer Stig Lindberg and the American artist Peter Voulkos.

His works are in notable museums including the Smithsonian American Art Museum and the Everson Museum of Art.

== Death ==
After Ernie's death, In 1998, the Richmond Art Center instituted an annual prize for artists in craft media that bears his name. The Richmond Art Center created the annual Ernie Kim Award in his honor.
