= Lisa Larson =

Swedish ceramicist and designer (1931–2024)

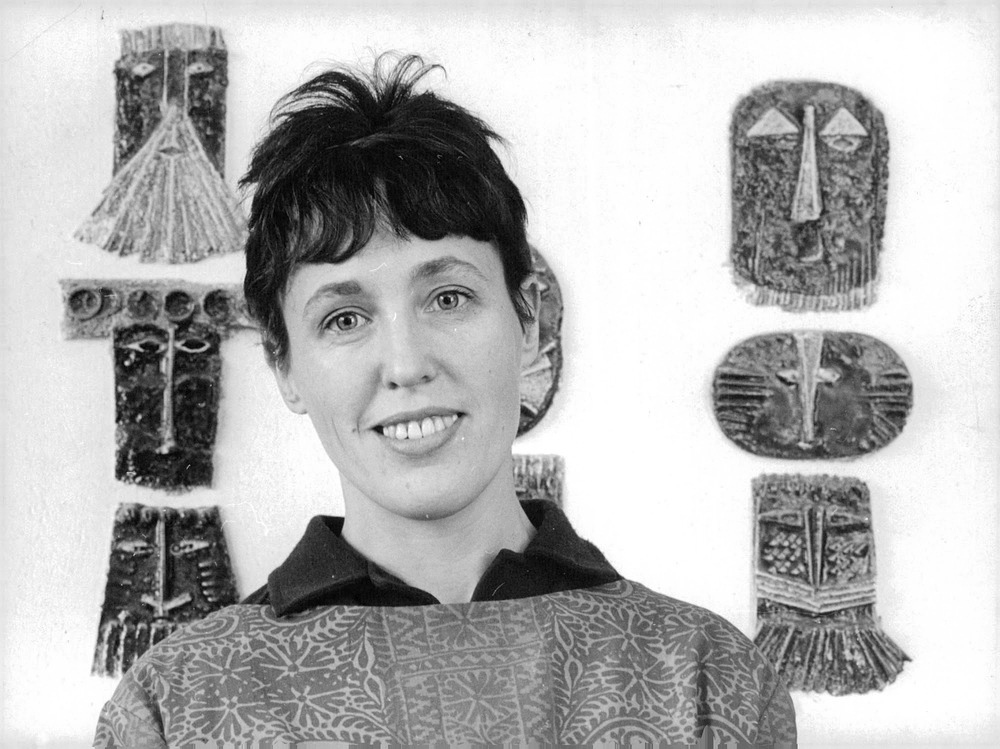
- Larson in 1969
- Born: 9 September 1931; Gothenburg, Sweden
- Died: 11 March 2024 (aged 92); Nacka, Sweden
- Occupations: Ceramicist and designer

Lisa Larson (9 September 1931 – 11 March 2024) was a Swedish ceramicist and designer. She is best known for her sculptures Small Zoo (1955), ABC-girls (1958), Africa (1964) and Children of the World (1974–1975).

== Biography ==
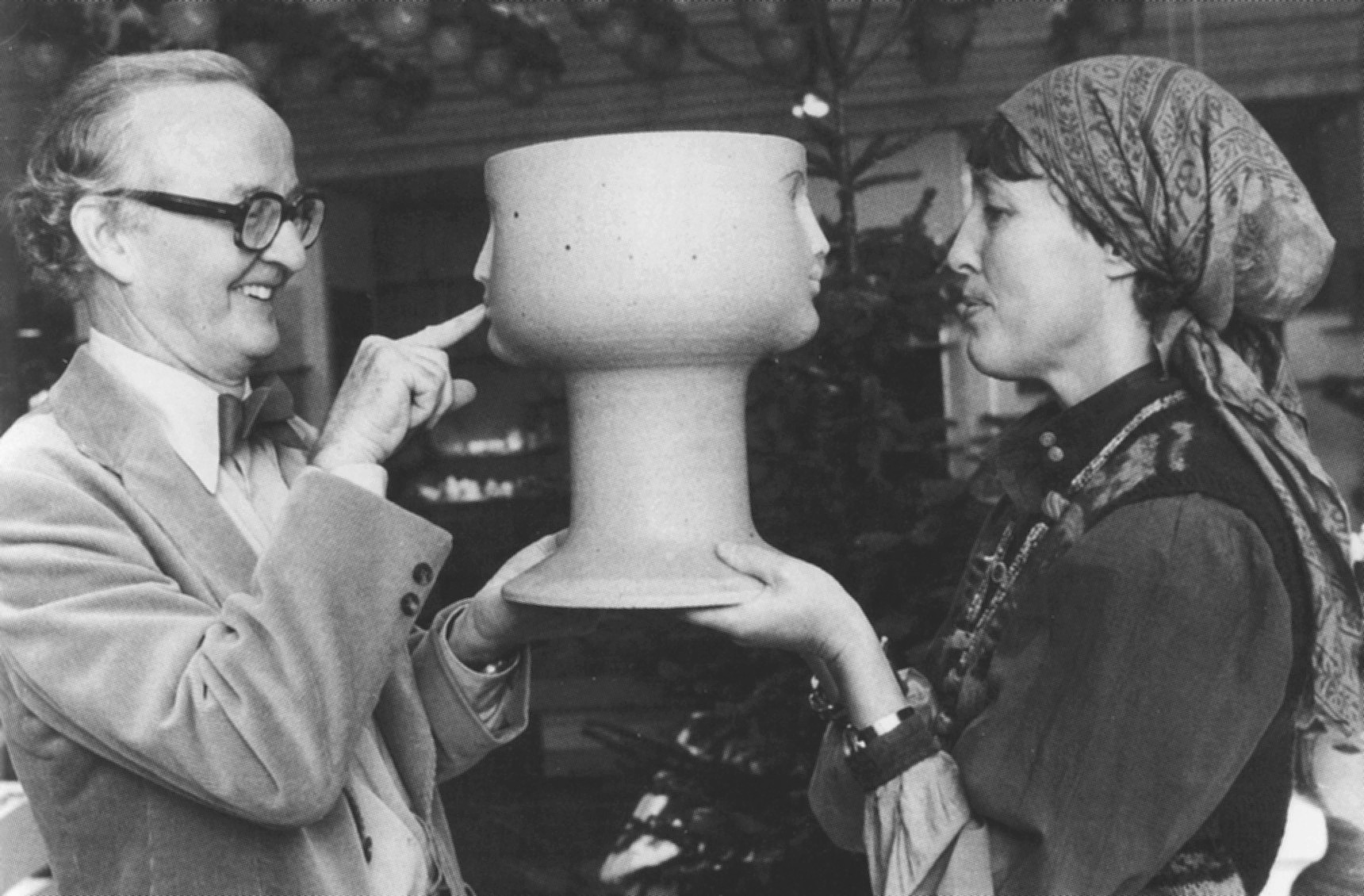
Stig Lindberg and Lisa Larson (1967)

Larson was born in 1931 in the Härlunda borough in Älmhult, birthplace of IKEA. She studied at College of Crafts and Design in Gothenburg between 1949 and 1954.

Larson is well known for her ceramic work which depicts animals and figures. After she finished her education, she competed in a Scandinavian art competition where she was approached by Stig Lindberg who offered her a one year trial position at the Gustavsberg porcelain factory. Larson eventually left Gustavsberg in 1980 to do freelance work for a number of Swedish companies including Duka, Kooperativa Förbundet and Åhléns.

In 1992, Larson founded the Gustavsberg Ceramic Studio with a few of her former colleagues. The studio continues to produce new designs and small scale production still takes place there.

Larson died on 11 March 2024, at the age of 92.

== List of works ==
- ABC-GIRLS: Lisa Larson designed the ABC Girls (ABC-FLICKOR) series in 1958 for the Gustavsberg factory. The series consists of five curvaceous women in 1950s typical dresses. The figurines were originally meant to be used as book support but they were too light weighted for that purpose. In the last few years of production, the ABC girls were produced with the expensive and time consuming chromo print technique. These rare girls with flowery dresses are now highly valued among the Lisa Larson collectors.
- ADAM & EVA: Lisa Larson designed the Adam & Eva series in 1972 for the Gustavsberg factory. The series consists of two freckled children couple with different ages and sizes. Lisa made sure that the boy and girl figurine in every couple were of equal sizes. The series is made of chamotte stoneware which is partly painted and glazed in strong and joyous colors.
- ADVENT 1956: The series ”Advent” consists of four candleholders, two vases, and a bowl. They are made of white stoneware with black glaze and blue/green incised decoration.
- ADVENT AND LUCIA: Lisa Larson's traditional Advent children and Lucia processions are some of her most beloved objects. As in the Swedish tradition in December, they consist of a Lucia, a star boy, an elf, and a maid. Lisa designed the smaller children in 1978 in the series "Advent", often called "Advent Children" or "Small Lucia Procession". Since the 1990s, they have been crafted by the Rörstrand company. The larger children were designed for the Ceramic Studio Gustavsberg during the 1990s and are often called the "Large Lucia Procession". All figurines in the two Lucia processions can be used as candleholders except for the large elf. During the 1990s, a new Advent candleholder arrived at the Ceramic Studio Gustavsberg. The four adorable angel girls in pastel colors can brighten even the darkest Nordic winters!
- AFRIKA: Lisa Larson designed the Africa (Afrika) series in 1964. The series consists of six animal figurines ranging from small lions to gigantic donkeys. The Africa objects are made of chamotte stoneware decorated with glaze in mild och subtle colors.
- CHILDREN OF THE WORLD: Lisa Larson's ”Children of the world” (All världens barn) were designed in 1974-1975 for the Gustavsberg factory. Since the 1990s, they are manufactured by Keramikstudion Gustavsberg. The hand-decorated children have a kind and subtly humorous expression.
- ANGELS: Lisa Larson's angels have different shapes, sizes, and colors. But all share a kind and slightly humorous expression.
- ASTRAKAN: The ”Astrakhan” series consists of one small plate and one dish. They are made of white stoneware with glossy bluish-green glaze and apple motif in relief. The name Astrakhan comes from a group of apples originated in Russia.
- ASTRID LINDGREN: Lisa Larson's friendly figurines from Astrid Lindgren’s world have rounded shapes with a kind and slightly humorous expression.
- BEARS: Lisa Larson's beloved bears have different shapes, sizes, and colors. But all share a kind and slightly humorous expression.
- BOWLS & DISHES: Lisa Larson’s artistry includes a vast and diversified production of bowls and dishes. They have a great range of motifs, color schemes, and sizes. The bowls and dishes are made of stoneware with glazes ranging from very subtle to striking strong colors.
- BRONZE: Lisa Larson designed five bronze figurines for Galleri Scandia in 1978. The works of art were cast and given heartwarming expressions.
- BIRDS: Lisa Larson's birds (phoenix, chickens, cocks, owls, ...) are amongst her most beloved and well-known figurines. Her birds come in all shapes and sizes, but they all share a kind and subtly humorous expression.
- CANDLEHOLDERS: Lisa Larson’s artistry includes a vast and diversified production of candleholders. They have a great range of motifs, color schemes, and sizes. The candleholders are made of stoneware with glazes ranging from very subtle to striking strong colors.
- CATS: Lisa Larson's cats are amongst her most beloved and well-known figurines. Her cats come in all shapes and sizes, but they all share a kind and gentle expression.
- CHRISTMAS: Lisa Larson's figurines and candleholders for Christmas have rounded shapes with a kind and slightly humorous expression.
- CLAIRE: Lisa Larson designed the Claire series in 1986 for the Åhléns department store. It consists of candleholders with geometric forms, white glossy glaze, and modern expression.
- DOGS: Lisa Larson's dogs come in all shapes and sizes, but they all share a kind and gentle expression.
- DUKA TABLEWARE: Lisa Larson designed tableware for Duka in the 1980s. It came with swelling animal forms and colorful details on a porcelain background.
- EASTER: Lisa Larson's Easter animals have different shapes, sizes, and colors. But all share a kind and slightly humorous expression.
- ELKS: Lisa Larson's endearing elks have different shapes, sizes, and colors. But all share a kind and slightly humorous expression.
- FISH: Lisa Larson has designed six fish for Keramikstudion Gustavsberg. The first five comprises the "Ocean" series from 1992 and are available in all kinds of colors. The figurines were first exhibited at the NK department store in Stockholm. The quartet comes with or without metal display stands. During the 2000s, the group was expanded with a small fish from the series "Miniature".
- SOCCER PLAYER: The ”Soccer Player” is made of chamotte stoneware with a rounded shape and proud expression. It was decorated in many color schemes according to different team colors.
- FOXES: Lisa Larson's foxes have different shapes, sizes, and colors. But all share a kind and slightly humorous expression.
- GLASS: During the 1970s and 1980s, Lisa designed figurines, bottles, and candleholders made of glass. The rounded objects were cast or mouth-blown for Royal Krona or Skruf.
- GOEBEL: Lisa Larson’s artistry includes candleholders from Goebel. They have a great range of shapes and sizes. The candleholders are made of porcelain with decors ranging from very subtle to striking strong colors.
- GRANADA: The ”Granada” series consists of three vases, one dish, and one bowl. They are made of chamotte stoneware with incised decoration and dark blue glaze. The name Granada comes from a Spanish city.
- GOLDEN TREE: The ”Golden Tree” series consists of two trees of different sizes. They are made of chamotte stoneware with brown glaze, golden crown and bird inhabitants.
- HARLEQUIN: The ”Harlequin” series consists of two wall plaques, one bowl, and one mirror. They are made of white stoneware with forest green glaze. The colorful decor in relief depicts acrobats and birds.
- HOUSES: Lisa Larson started to design house sculptures for building companies. They come in different shapes, sizes, and colors. But the houses all share a charming and joyous expression.
- HÖGANÄS: Lisa Larson’s artistry includes flower pots and candleholders from Höganäs. They have a great range of shapes and sizes. They are made of stoneware with decors ranging from very subtle to striking strong colors.
- ICE HOCKEY PLAYERS: The ”Hockey Players” series consists of a goalkeeper and an outfielder. They are made of white stoneware with decoration in Swedish colors.
- JANG: Lisa Larson worked as a freelance designer for the department store chain Åhléns in 1986. During this period, she designed the tableware series ”Jang”. It was made of stoneware with off-white glaze and blue border. The series became extremely popular and was manufactured right up to 2010.
- JARS: Lisa Larson's joyous jars are among her most beloved figurines. They have different sizes, colors and motifs. But all share a kind and slightly humorous expression.
- JULEBO: Lisa Larson designed the Julebo series in 1986 for the Åhléns department store. It consists of four Santa figurines with rounded forms, colorful glazes, and kindhearted expressions.
- JULIUS & JULIANA: The ”Julius & Juliana” series consists of a boy and a girl candleholder. They are made of chamotte stoneware with rounded shapes and joyous expression.
- JURA: Lisa Larson designed the Jura series in 1971 for the Gustavsberg factory. The series consists of six animal figurines ranging from charming turtles to chubby cats. The Jura objects are made of stoneware decorated with glaze in subtle colors.
- KAROLIN: The ”Caroline” series consists of four vases, two bowls, one small plate, and one candleholder. They are made of white stoneware with light blue glaze and dark blue decoration. Era-typical expression!
- PROVINCIAL ANIMALS: Lisa Larson designed the ”Provincial Animals” (Landskapsdjur) in 1990–1992 for the Jie factory. The series consists of 14 figurines ranging from absentminded hares to charming bears. The series consists of 14 objects ranging from absent minded hares to charming bears. The animals were made of chamotte stoneware and decorated with glazes in subtle colors
- LARSONS KIDS: Lisa Larson designed the Larson's kids (Larsons ungar) series in 1961 for the Gustavsberg factory. The series consists of six children figurines in era-typical clothes. The figurines are made of chamotte stoneware decorated with glaze in joyous colors. Lisa got the idea for the series from her own children. One of the figurines, Johanna, was named after her daughter.
- LIONS: Lisa Larson's lions are amongst her most beloved and well-known figurines. They come in all shapes and sizes, but all share a kind and warmhearted expression.
- LILLA ZOO: One day in the 1950s, Lisa Larson made a model of a cat with its tail in the air. The cat was made of dark brown chamotte stoneware with carved stripes on the back. Only the face was covered in a grayish white glaze with painted eyes, nose and whiskers. This modernistic cat was followed by two other cats with typical fifties expression. The cats later became part of the Small Zoo (Lilla zoo) series. The series consists of seven animal figurines in total.
- MASKS: Lisa Larson started to design masks for Gustavsberg during the 1970s. They come in different shapes, sizes, and colors. But the masks all share a rustic and mythological expression.
- MATILDA: The ”Mathilde” series consists of twelve parts, of which the majority is tableware. They are made of flintware with light blue glaze and dark blue painted pattern. The candleholder and tureen come in different color schemes. The cup’s shape is the same as the shape for the ”Josephine” cup in 1962.
- MENAGERIE: Lisa Larson designed the Menagerie (Menageri) series in 1965 for the Gustavsberg factory. The series consists of five animal figurines ranging from proud dromedaries to perky mouses. The Menagerie objects are made of chamotte stoneware decorated in part with glaze in subtle colors.
- MICE: Lisa Larson's merry mice have rounded shapes with a kind and slightly humorous expression.
- MINI-ZOO: Lisa Larson's Mini Zoo animals come from different species, but all share a kind and slightly humorous expression.
- NOAH'S ARK: Lisa Larson designed the Noah's Arc (Noaks ark) series in 1978 for the Gustavsberg factory. The series consists of ten animal figurines ranging from penguins to elephants. The Noah's Arc objects are made of chamotte stoneware decorated with glaze in subtle colors.
- PALOMA: The ”Paloma” series consists of two dishes and one colorful dove. They are made of white stoneware with rounded shapes and incised decors. The name Paloma comes from the Spanish word for dove.
- PIPI LONGSTOCKING: Lisa Larson's Pippi Longstocking girls have different shapes, sizes, and colors. But all share a kind and slightly humorous expression.
- EASTER: Lisa Larson designed the easter (Påsk) series in Easter for Kooperativa Förbundet. It consists of tableware pieces with chicken forms and mottled brown glaze.
- QAUERTETTE: Lisa Larson designed the Quartette series in 1986 for the Åhléns department store. It consists of vases with block forms, uni-colored glossy glazes, and modern expression.
- THE PUBLIC DEBATE: ”The Public Debate” series consists of two figurines with different sizes where a woman carries her man. They are made of chamotte (small) and white (large) stoneware respectively. The decoration of the larger figurine is made by chromo print with many different color schemes
- SANTA AND ELFS: Lisa Larson's Santas and elfs have different shapes, sizes, and colors.
- SEALS: Lisa Larson's sociable seals have different shapes, sizes, and colors.
- TURN OF THE CENTURY: "The Turn of the Century” series consists of two families of brothers and sister. The smaller trio has two versions: white stoneware and chamotte stoneware. The large trio is only made of chamotte stoneware.
- NEAT NORDIC ZOO: Lisa Larson designed the Nordic Zoo (Skansen) series in 1976-1978 for the Gustavsberg factory. The series consists of 14 Nordic animals ranging from small foxes to majestic elks. The figurines are made of stoneware decorated with glaze in subtle colors.
- SHOAL: The Stim (Shoal) consists of three dishes and two bowls. They are made of white stoneware with fish shapes, bluish green glaze, and black decoration.
- LARGE ZOO: Lisa Larson designed the Large Zoo (Stora zoo) series in 1957-1965 for the Gustavsberg factory. The series consists of 13 animal figurines ranging modernistic cats to grand giraffes. The Stora zoo objects are made of chamotte stoneware decorated with glaze in subtle colors.
- TARRAGONA: The ”Tarragona” series consists of four vases, one pitcher, and one bowl. They are made of white stoneware with incised decoration and mustard yellow or turquoise glaze. The turquoise objects are slightly less common. The name Tarragona comes from a Spanish city.
- THALIA: The ”Thalia” series consists of four vases, one wall plaque, and one mirror. They are made of white stoneware with mustard yellow glaze and relief decor depicting animals and people. The name Thalia comes from a goddess in Greek mythology.
- TIGERS: Lisa Larson has designed tigers for Gustavsberg. They are made of stoneware with joyous expressions.
- TRAFFIC: The ”Traffic” series consists of six figurines with a transportation theme. They are made if white stoneware with a humorous expression.
- TURTLES: Lisa Larson designed turtles for Gustavsberg during the 1960s and 1970s. They come in different shapes, sizes, and colors. But the turtles all share a kind and slightly humorous expression.
- UNIQUE OBJECTS: Lisa Larson's unique production covers more than 60 years of artistry.
- VARIETE: The ”Variety” series consists of seven vases, four dishes, and one jar. They are made of white stoneware with black glaze and colorful animal and human motifs in relief. The word variety describes a performance with acts of singing and dancing.
- VASES: Lisa Larson’s artistry includes a vast and diversified production of vases. They have a great range of motifs, color schemes, and sizes. The vases are made of stoneware or glass with glazes ranging from very subtle to striking strong colors.
- VIKINGS: Lisa Larson's vivid vikings have different shapes, sizes, and colors. But all share a kind and slightly humorous expression.
- WALL PLAQUES: Lisa Larson artistry encompasses a vast and diversified production of wall plaques. The production covers great range of motifs, color settings and sizes. The wall plaques are made of stoneware in relief. They are decorated with glazes ranging from very subtle to striking strong colors
- WOOD: During the late 1960s, Lisa designed wooden objects for Sandberg's in Nora. They had rounded geometric shapes, strong colors, and joyous expression.
- WWF: Lisa Larson designed the Endangered Species (Utrotningshotade djur) in 1975-81 for the Gustavsberg factory. The series was produced for the benefit of the World Wildlife Foundation. Endangered Species consists of seven animal figurines ranging from chubby harbor seals to mythological lynx. The objects are made of stoneware with hand decorated glazes in earthy colors.

== Gallery ==
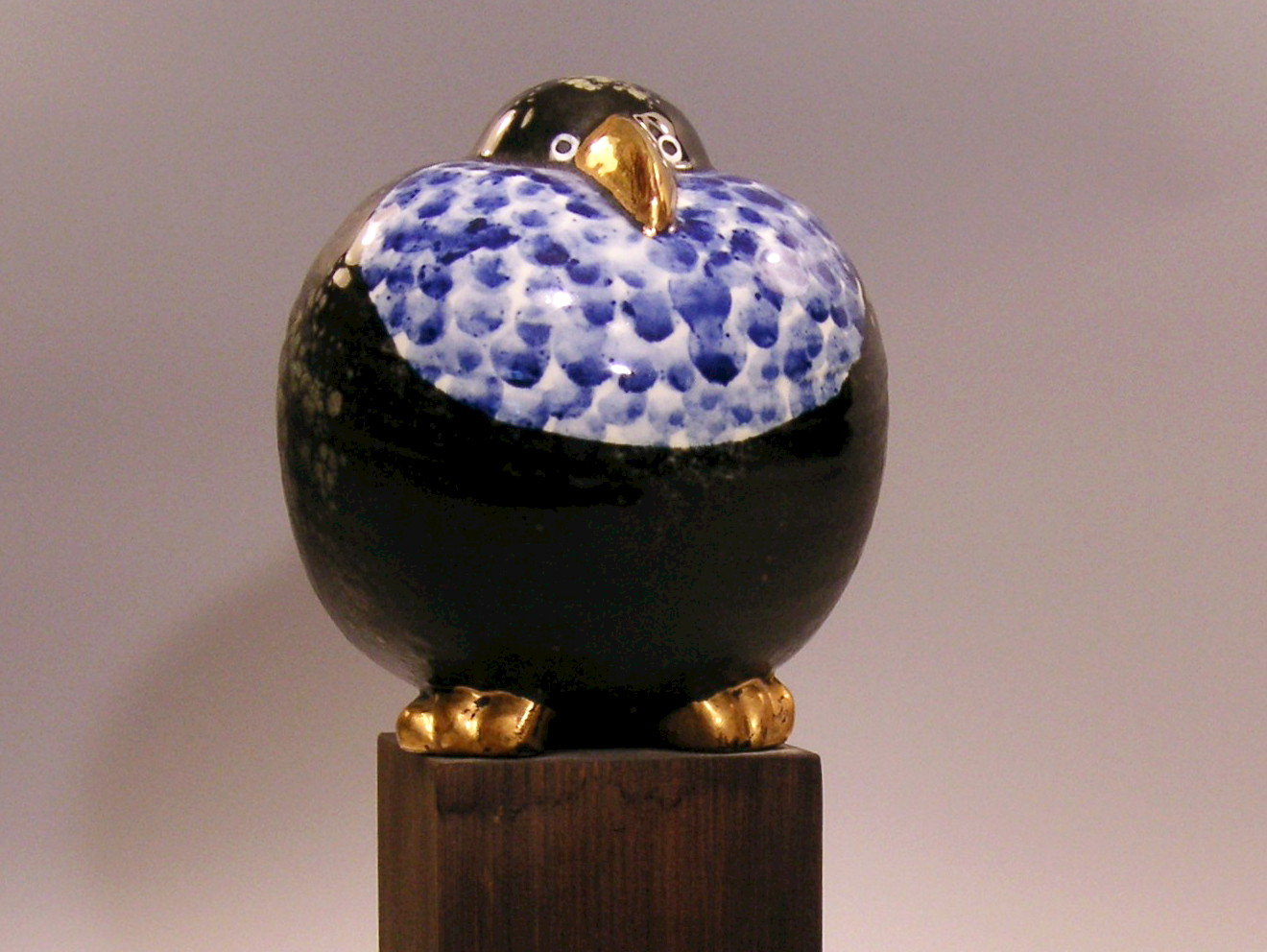

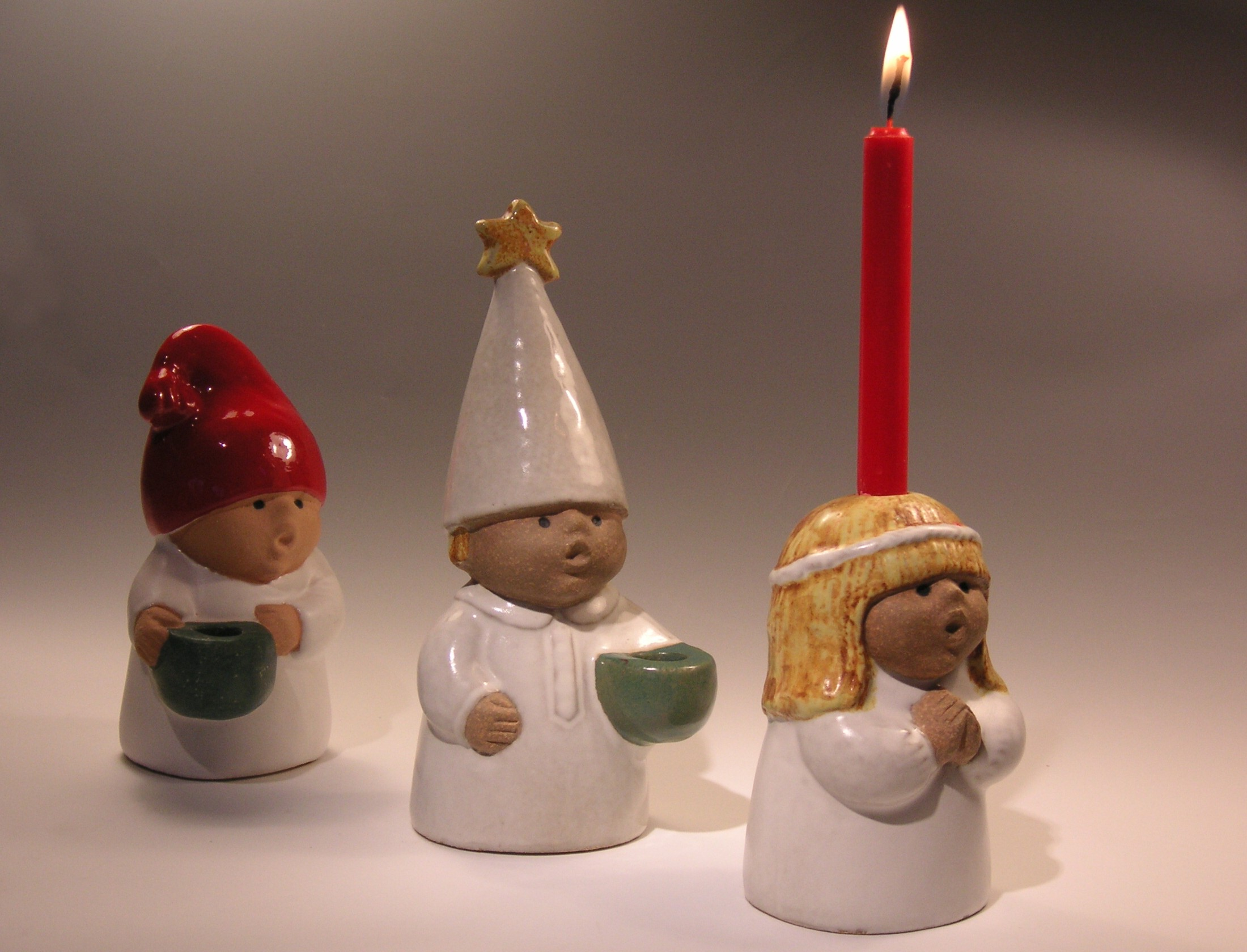

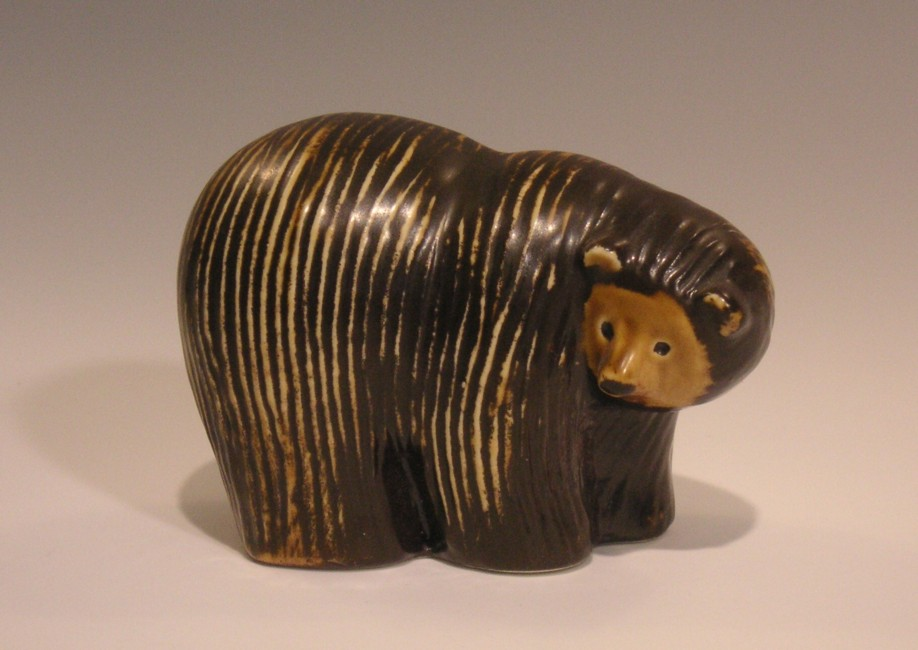

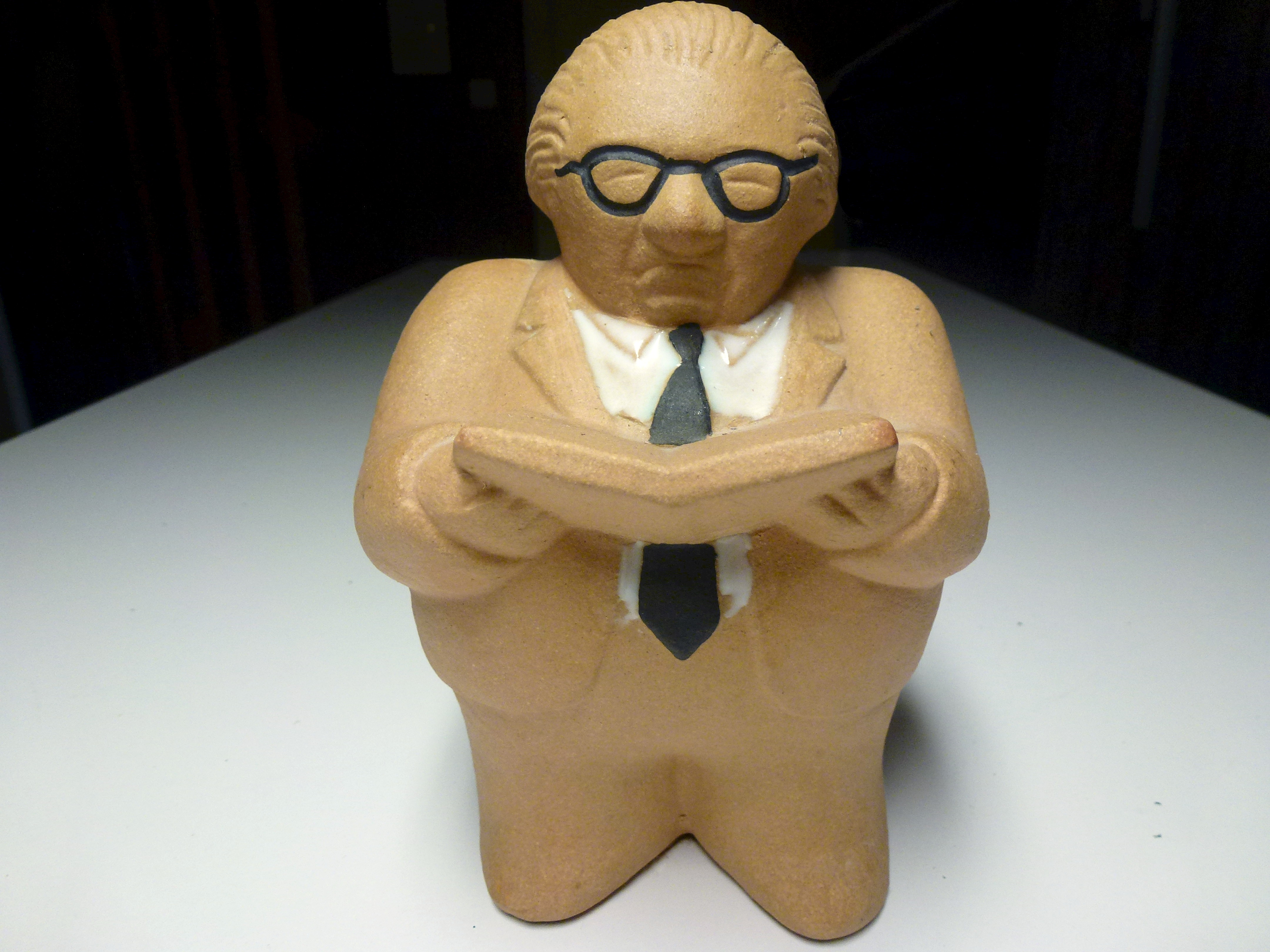

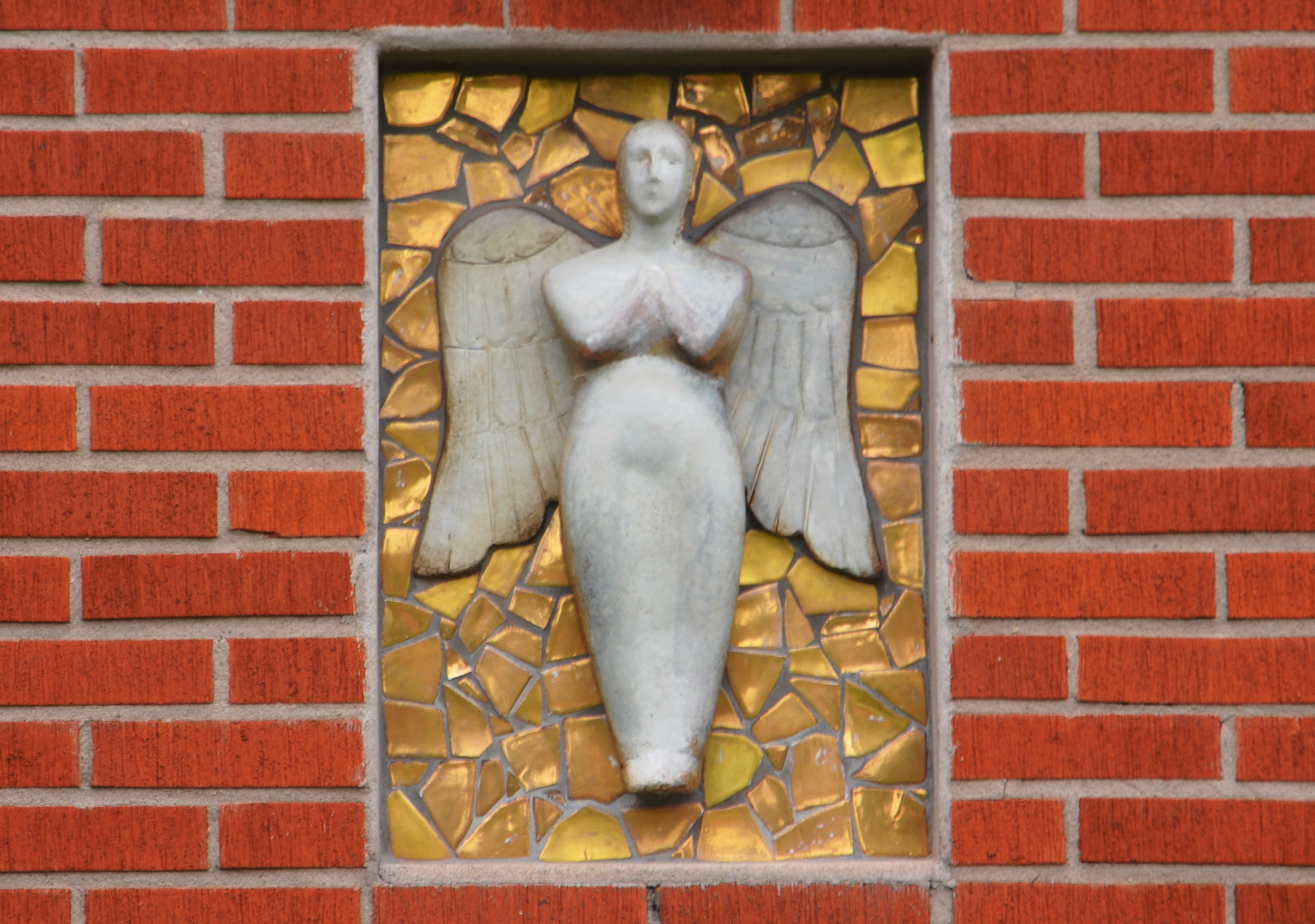

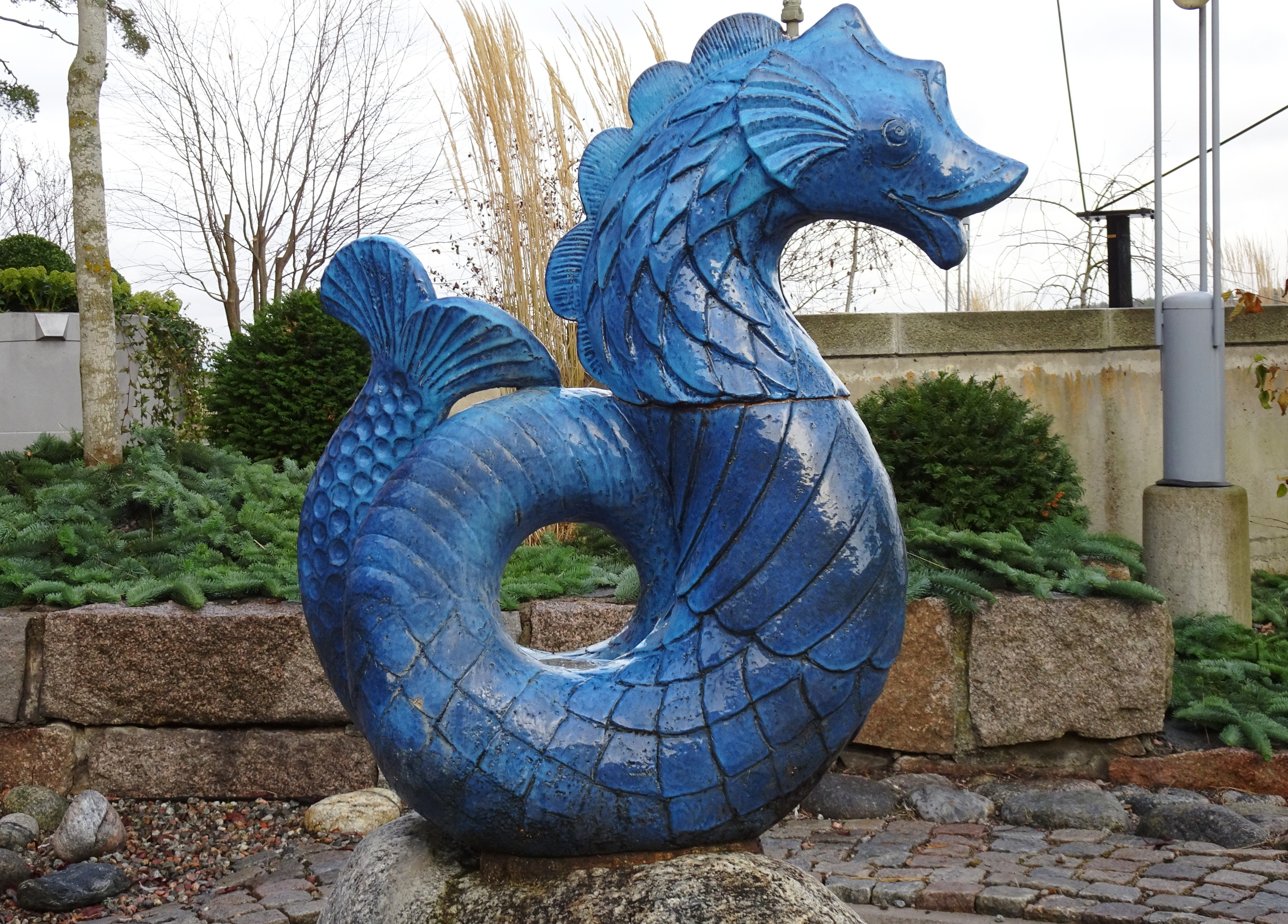
