= Axel Odelberg =

Swedish chemical engineer (1873-1950)

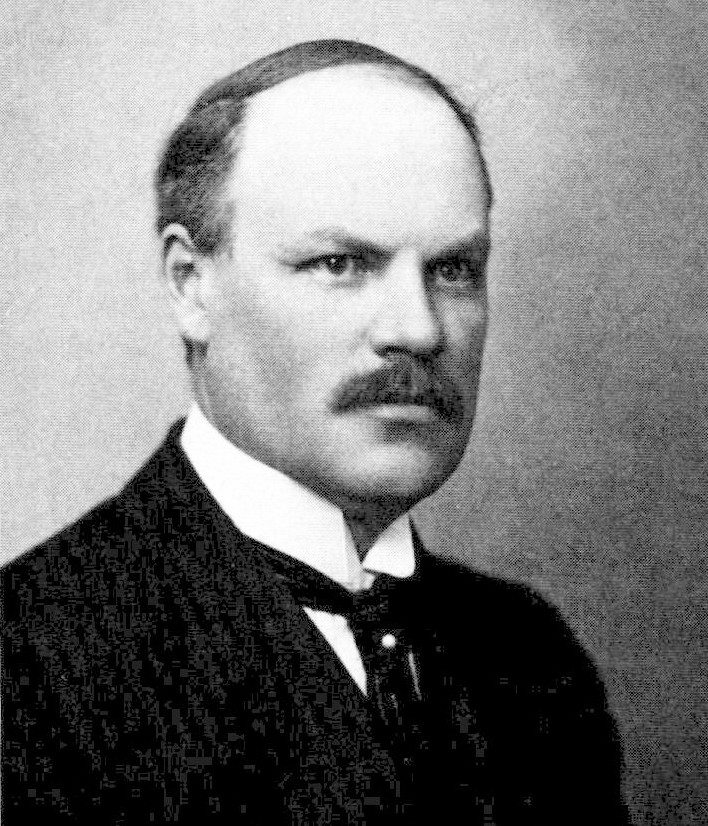
Axel Odelberg.

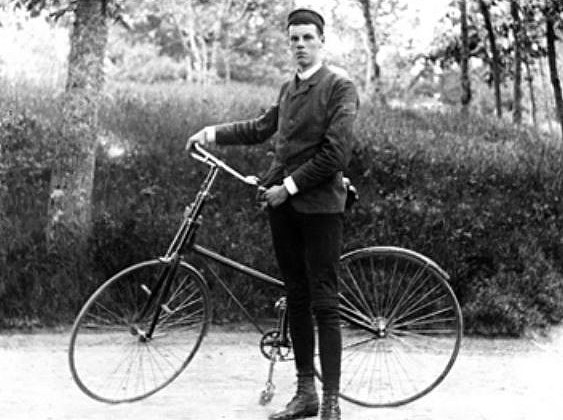
Axel Odelberg at the age of 16

Axel Samuel Wilhelm Odelberg (16 April 1873 – 25 November 1950) was a Swedish chemical engineer working in the porcelain industry.

== Biography ==
Odelberg was born in Gustavsberg. He was the son of industry owner Wilhelm Odelberg and the brother of Victor Odelberg.

Odelberg graduated chemistry technical class in 1895 from the Royal Institute of Technology in Stockholm. After his studies he travelled to Zürich to get education in ceramics. In 1895 he was employed as an engineer at Gustavsbergs porslinsfabrik that was owned by his father. In 1899 he became the lead-engineer and led the factories drive. The same year, he married Maud Jane Beavis (1873–1962) in London. He ran the continuation work at the porcelain productions methods and machine-park. Among other things he showed the superiority of electricity over steam-power. Electricity was first used at Gustavsberg in 1925.

But Odelberg wanted to renew the production range and started to use Svenska Slöjdförening's program for more beautiful everyday goods. At his initiative he employed the artist Wilhelm Kåge whose work resulted in an internationally known everyday porcelain for the general public. Kåge later became the factory's artistic leader.

Through his British wife he made connections with the owners of the British porcelain producers Wedgwood and became a goodwill ambassador in England for the Swedish industry. He became an honorary member of The Ceramic Society, he was later named as a pioneer by the same society.

Odelberg died in 1950 in Djursholm.
