= Bernadotte & Kylberg =

Bernadotte & Kylberg was founded in 2012. They design products for a number of brands, specializing in industrial and graphic products. Their first joint project was a series of bowls for the Gustavsbergs Porslinsfabrik, called “Svenska djur” (Swedish animals). For the Swedish brand A-One, Bernadotte & Kylberg designed collections of thinner down jackets.

Participating in a charity project for Childhood, Bernadotte & Kylberg designed the carpet “Middle of Nowhere” out of scrap silk parachutes for the brand Vandra Rugs. That project led to a collaboration with department store chain Åhléns, which launched the Bernadotte & Kylberg company. The collaboration consists of home textiles including carpets, plaids, pillowcases, towels, bedspreads and bed sets.

In February 2014, a collaboration was formed with Danish design company Stelton, which was Bernadotte & Kylberg's first international assignment. The collection “Stockholm” consists of a series of bowls and vases, made out of aluminium and enamel with inspiration from the sea. One of these Stelton collections, called Stockholm Aquatic, was presented with the award for “high quality design” by the Red Dot Awards 2015.

Oscar Kylberg and Carl Philip Bernadotte both studied graphic design at Forsbergs School. Bernadotte also studied in the USA at Rhode Island School of Design, where he won a design competition (under a pseudonym). Kylberg has worked with design and brands in both international and national contexts as Creative Director.
