= Stig Lindberg =

Swedish artist

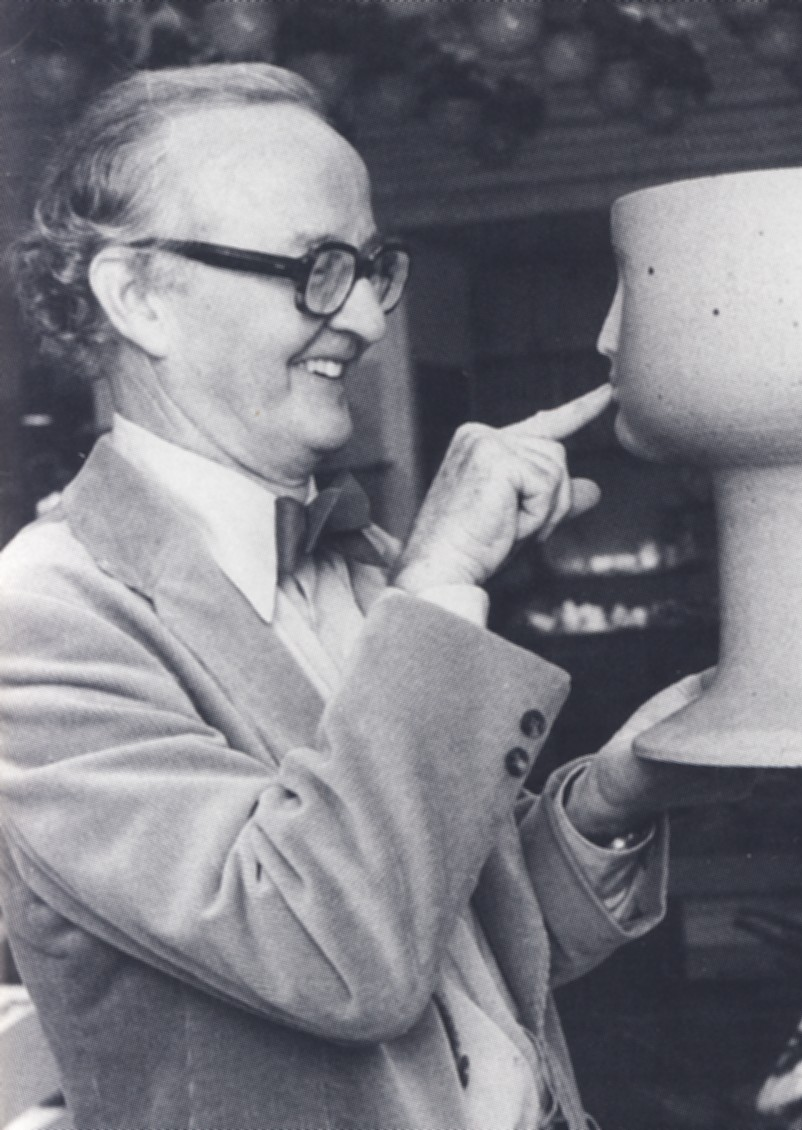
- Born: 17 August 1916; Umeå
- Died: 7 April 1982; Terracina
- Occupation: Illustrator, ceramist, designer
- Employer: Gustavsberg porcelain

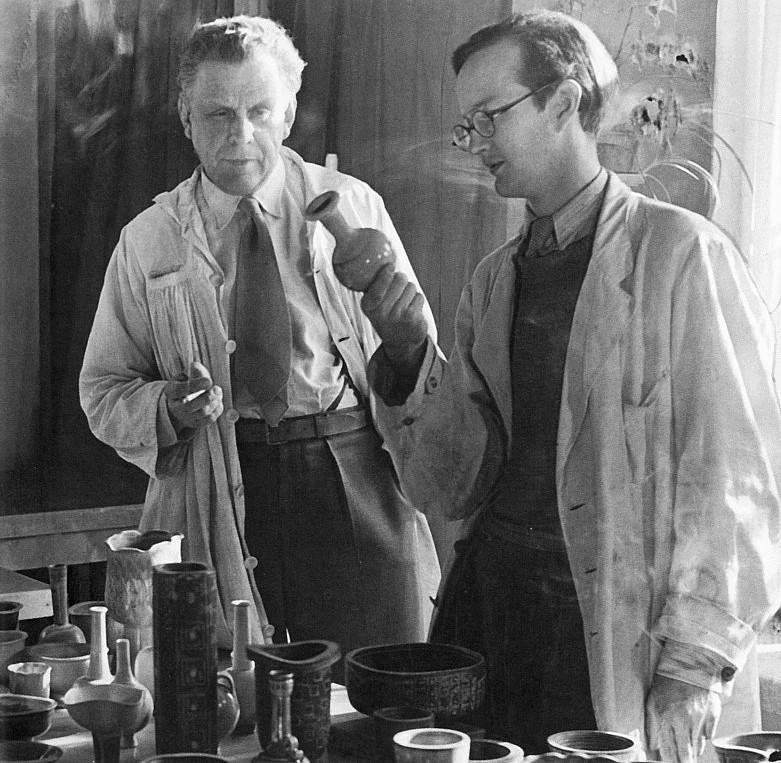
Wilhelm Kåge and Stig Lindberg (right), Gustavsberg, ca 1938

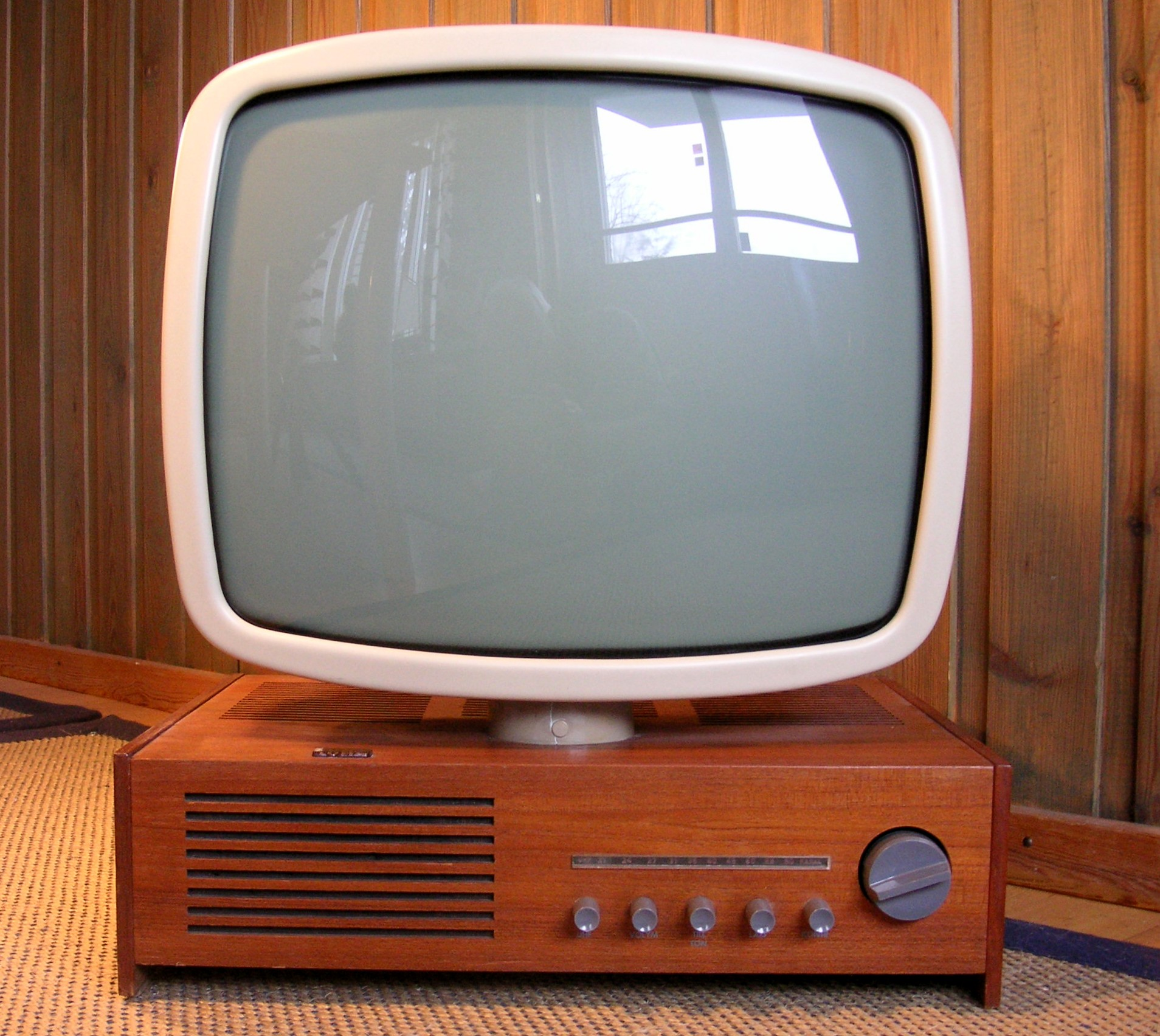
"Lumavision"

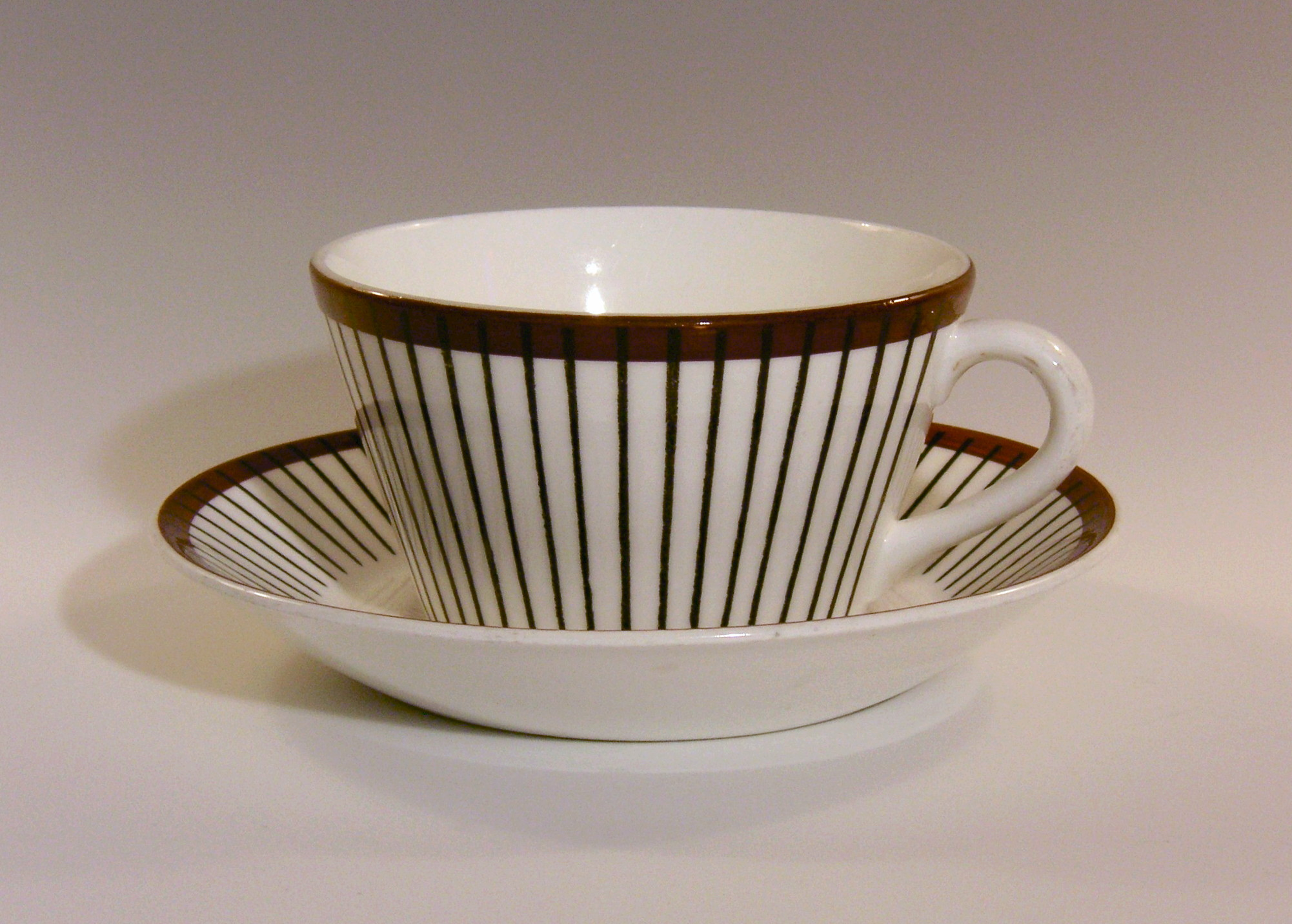
Spisa Ribb

Stig Lindberg (17 August 1916 – 7 April 1982) was a Swedish ceramic designer, glass designer, textile designer, industrial designer, painter, teacher, and illustrator. One of Sweden's most important postwar designers, Lindberg created whimsical studio ceramics and graceful tableware lines during a long career with the Gustavsberg pottery factory.

== Biography ==
Stig Lindberg was born on 17 August 1916 in Umeå, Sweden. Lindberg studied painting at the University College of Arts, Crafts and Design (now Konsfack).

In 1937, he went to work at Gustavsberg Fabriker under Wilhelm Kåge. In 1949, he was named Kåge's successor as art director. From this period until he left Gustavsberg in 1980, he designed individual ceramic items, as well as factory produced ranges and lines of dinnerware. He achieved fame for his eccentric forms and whimsical decoration.

From 1957 until 1970, he was a head teacher at Konstfack.

== Death and legacy ==
He died from a myocardial infarction on 7 April 1982, in San Felice Circeo, Italy.

Lindberg's work can be found in museum collections, including the Art Institute of Chicago, and the Museum of Modern Art in New York City. His work was featured in a posthumous exhibition at the Nationalmuseum in Stockholm, from 11 May 2006 to 25 February 2007.

== Career ==
- 1937–1957 and 1970–1980 Gustavsberg porcelain, art director (1949–1957, 1972–1978)
- 1947–1982 Nordiska Kompaniet, textile designer
- 1957–1970 University College of Arts, Crafts and Design, Konstfack, senior lecturer
- 1980–1982 Own studio, Italy

== Awards ==
- 1948, 1957, Milan Triennale, gold medal
- 1951, 1954, Milan Trienalle, grand prix
- 1954, Gold Medal Art Industrial Exhibition Madrid
- 1955, Gold Medal at the First International Ceramics Festival in Cannes
- 1957, Gregor Paulsson Trophy
- 1962, Gold Medal at the First International Ceramics Festival in Prague
- 1968, Prince Eugen Medal
- 1970, honorary professorship by the Swedish Government
- 1973, Faenza, gold medal

== See also ==
- Lisa Larson
