= Victor Odelberg =

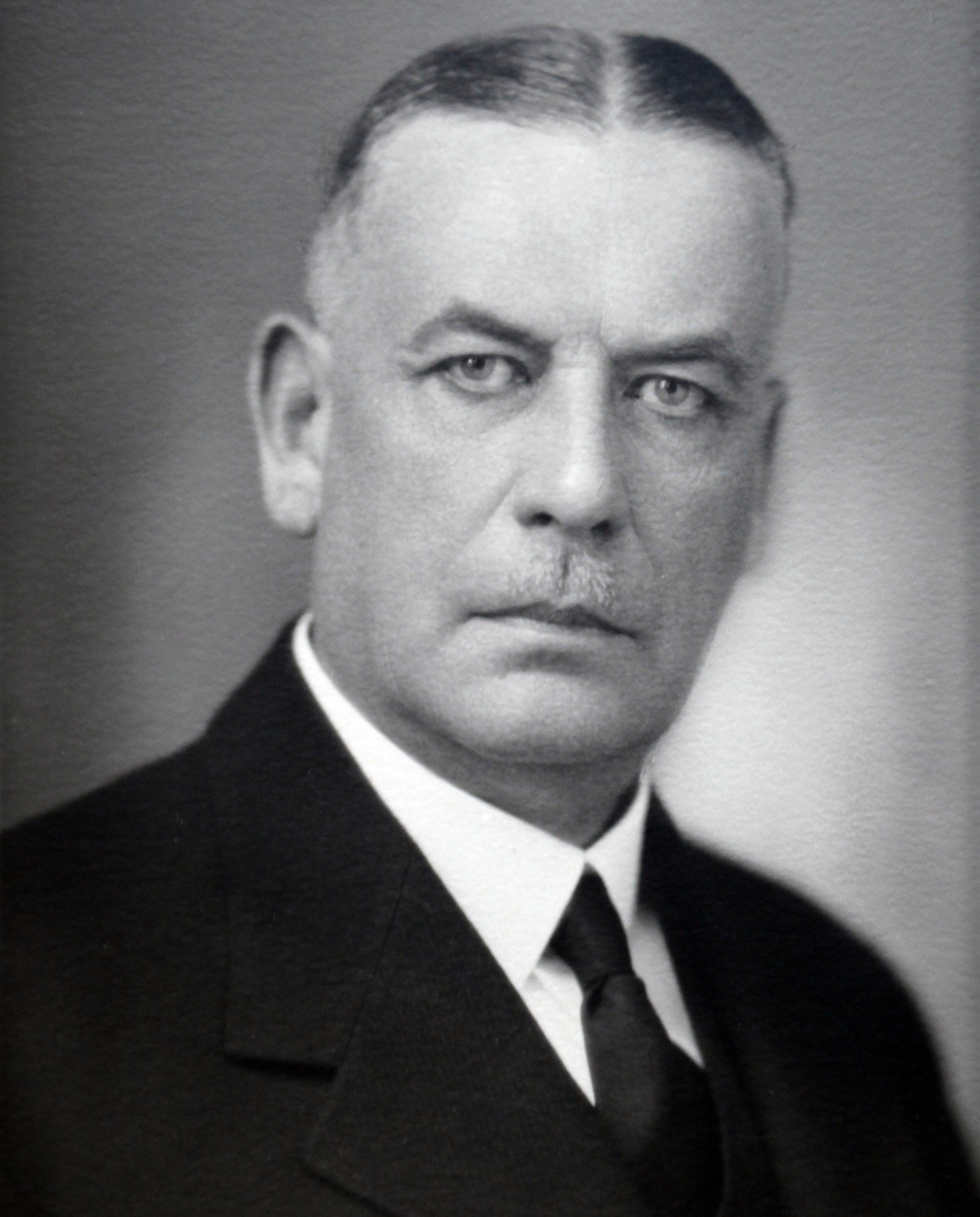
Victor Odelberg.

Victor James Wilhelm Odelberg (19 November 1875 in Gustavsberg - 10 March 1951) was a Swedish hofjægermester. He was the son of Wilhelm Odelberg and the brother of Axel Odelberg.

In 1900, Odelberg took his agronom graduation at Ultuna lantbruksinstitut, and was employed at Gustavsberg porslinsfabrik that was owned by his father. After the death of his father in 1924 Victor over as CEO of the factory and his brother became the chairman. Posts that they held on to until 1937.
