= Ösbyträsk Nature Reserve =

Nature reserve in Stockholm, Sweden

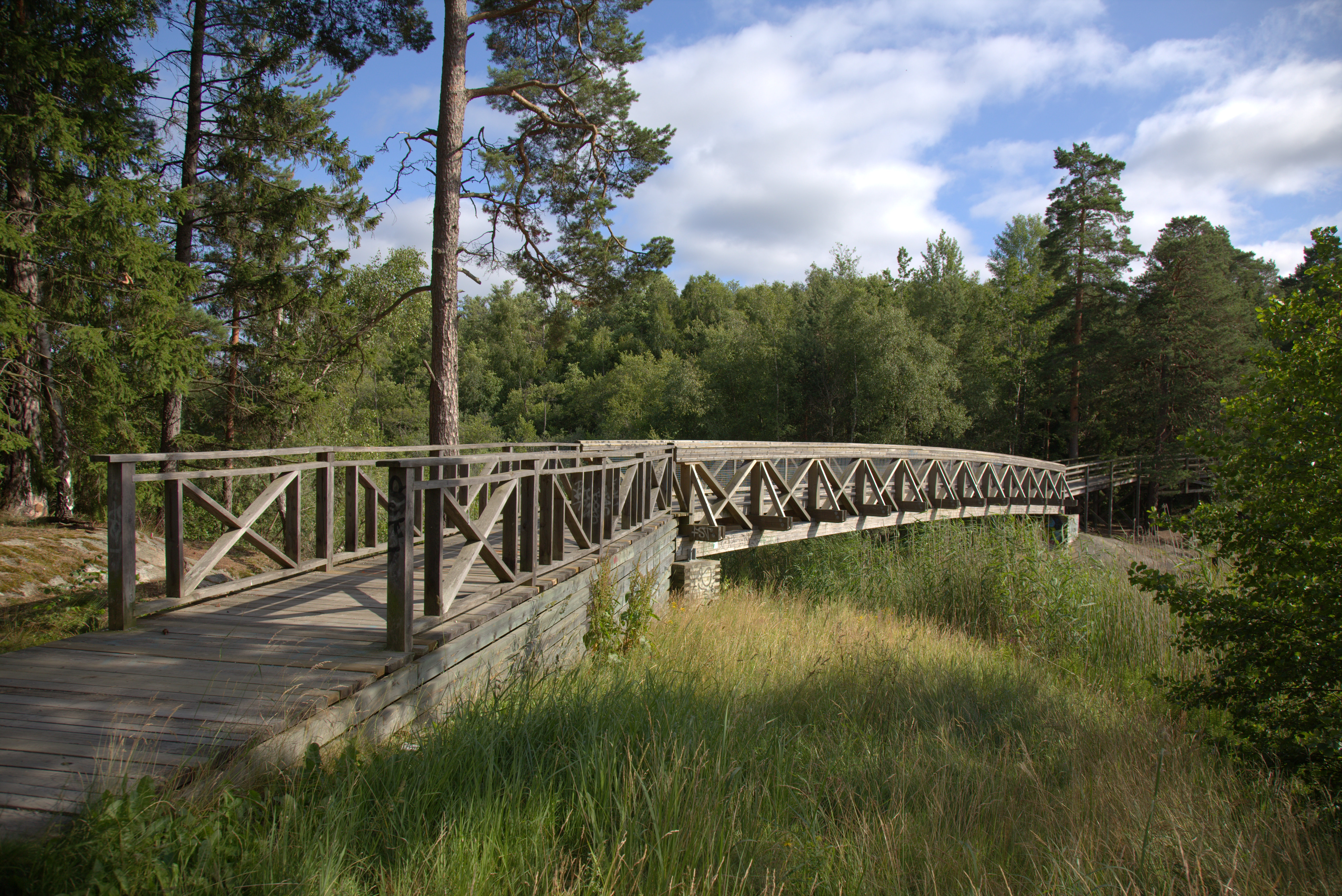

- Location within Stockholm
- Location: Värmdö Municipality, Sweden
- Nearest city: Gustavsberg
- Coordinates: 59°19′36″N 18°24′13″E
- Established: 2006

Ösbyträsk Nature Reserve (Swedish: Ösbyträsks naturreservat) is a nature reserve in Stockholm County in Sweden.

The nature reserve has been created to protect the lake Ösbyträsk and the surrounding area. The nature is varied and the area also has a rich cultural heritage. A 4.5 km (2.8 miles) long track for visitors goes around the lake.
