= Gustavsberg porcelain =

Swedish porcelain company

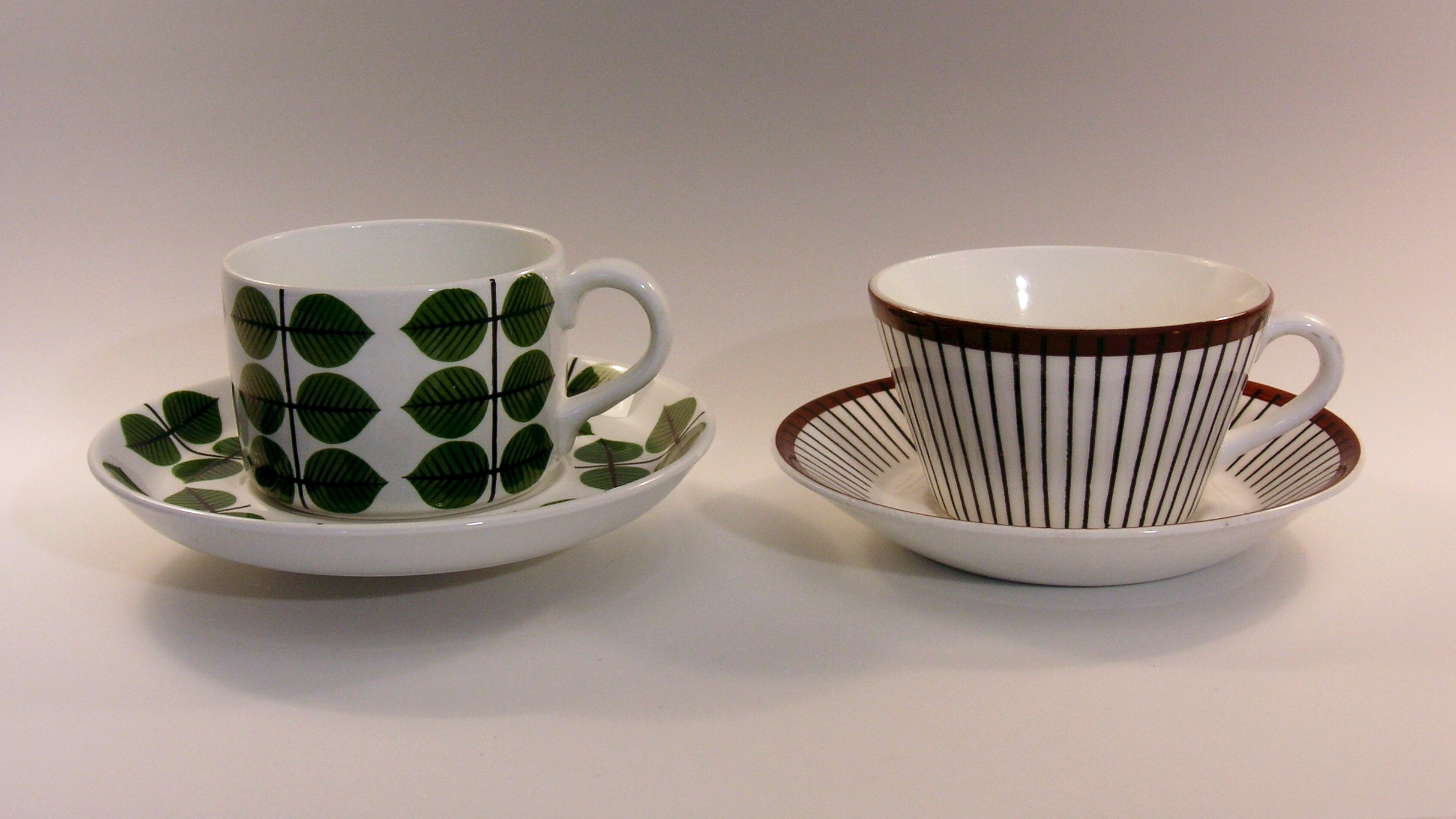
"Berså" (left) and "Spisa Ribb" porcelain, both designed by Stig Lindberg.

Gustavsberg is a Swedish porcelain company that originated in 1826. It broke up in the 1990s and was sold off in pieces, to the dismay of residents of the Gustavsberg area, but artisans continued producing ceramics and household porcelain in the Gustavsberg tradition.

Production was split up: AB Gustavsberg manufactures bathroom fixtures and sanitary ware and was a subsidiary of Villeroy & Boch from 2001 until its sale to the Finnish Oras Group in 2025. HPF i Gustavsberg AB, wholly Swedish-owned, continues to manufacture tableware in Gustavsberg.

One of Gustavsberg's most famous collections is the "Nobel Porcelain" produced in 1994. One such artisan was Josef Ekberg, who, even as a young man, created many pieces for Gustavsberg.

== Museum ==
The Gustavsberg Porcelain Museum is an art, design and industrial history museum in Gustavsberg, which has its origins in objects gradually preserved from the Gustavsberg Porcelain Factory production. The museum was not originally open for public viewing, but from 1956 there has been a museum open to the public. It is now run by Värmdö municipality. The municipality owns the property on the original factory site, while the object collection was donated to the National Museum by the previous owner to Gustavsbergs Factories, "Kooperativa Förbundet" (the Cooperative Union).

The basic exhibitions showing the history of porcelain from an international perspective, porcelain manufacture in Gustavsberg since the early 1800s, designs of Gustav's studio, in particular, Wilhelm Kåge, Stig Lindberg and Bernt Friberg and examples of functional porcelain from the 1900s.

The Museum Director is Kjell Lööw.

== Gallery ==
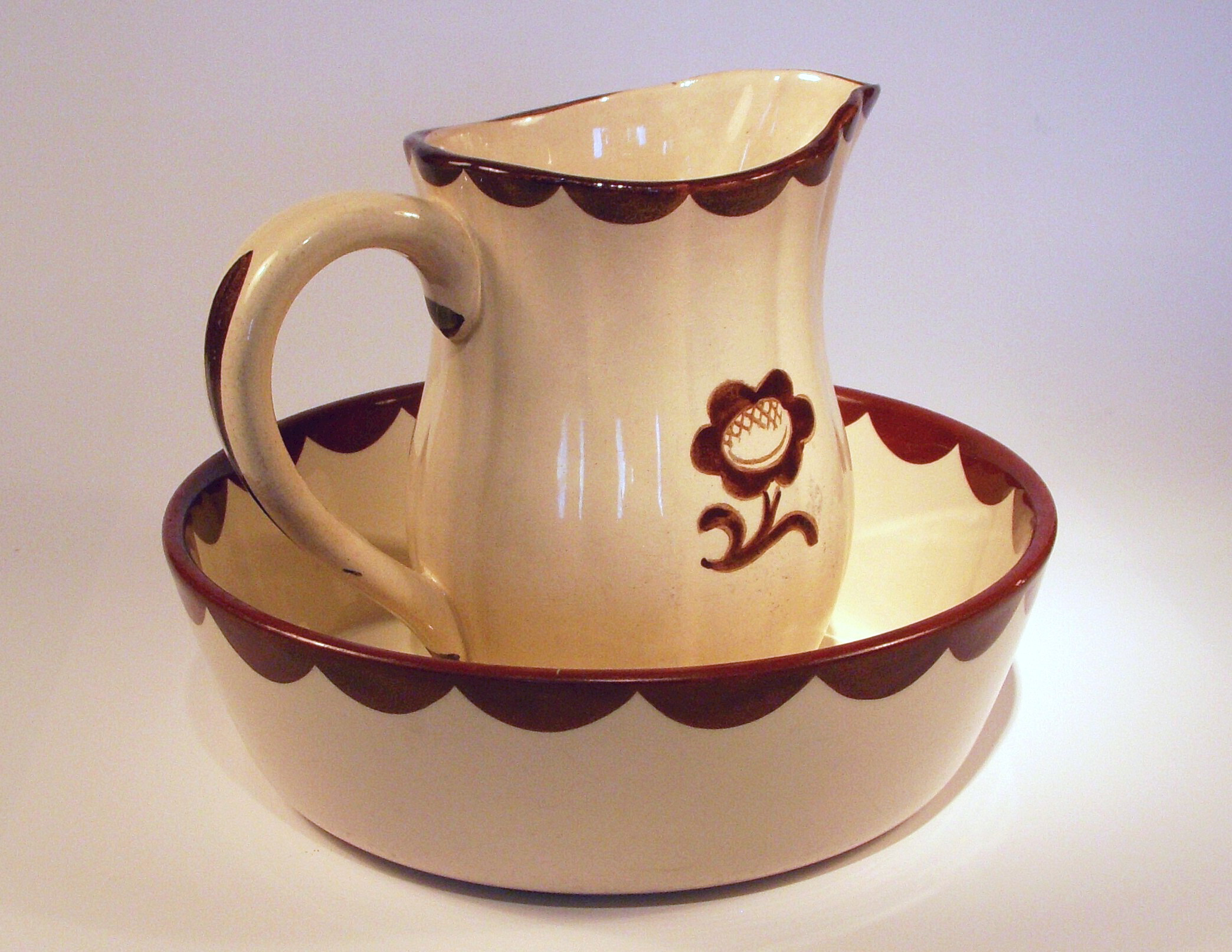
Pyro, designed by Wilhelm Kåge

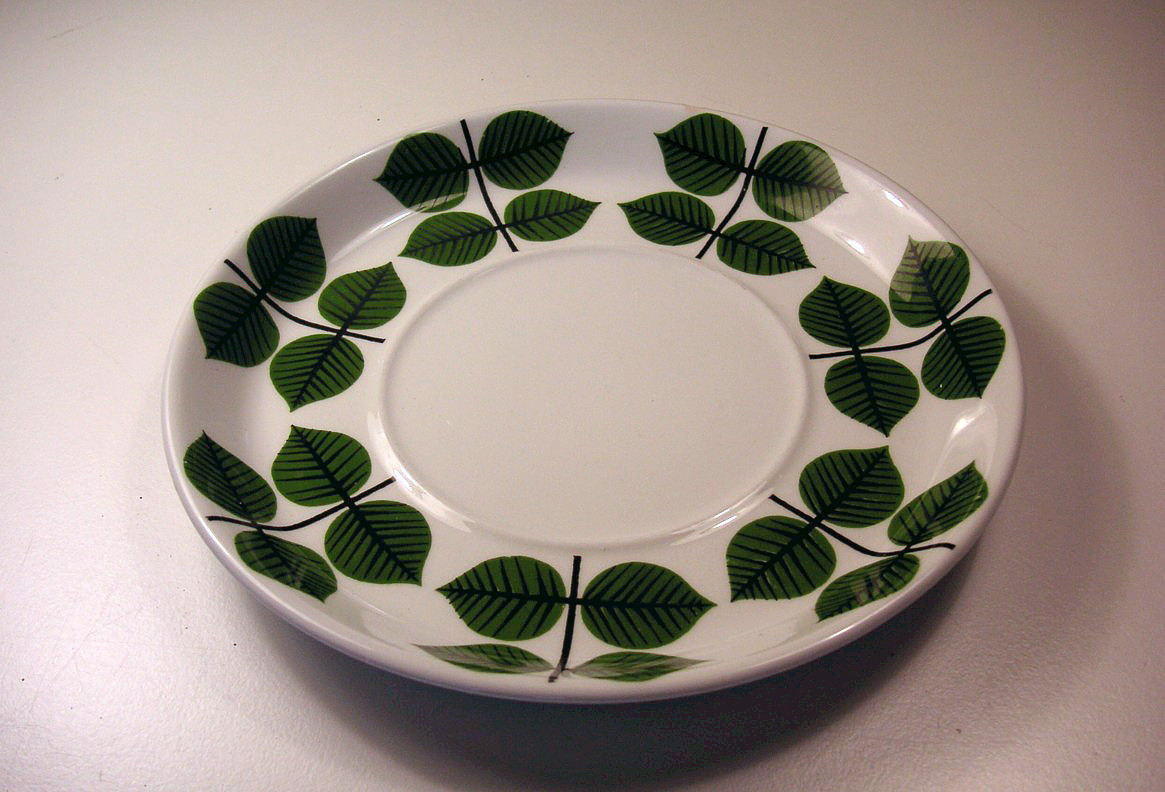
Berså tea plate, designed by Stig Lindberg

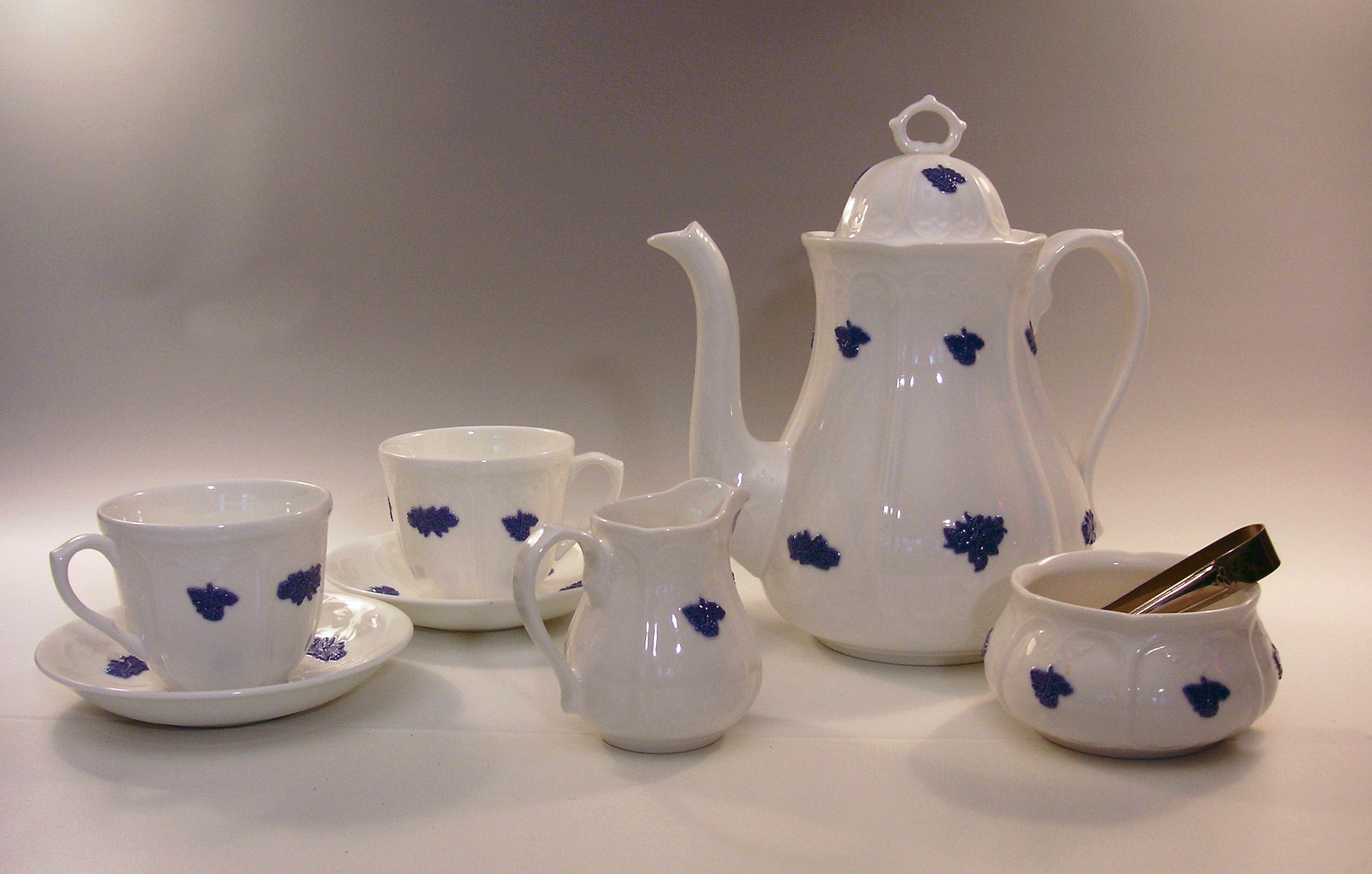
"Blå Blom" (blue flower) porcelain

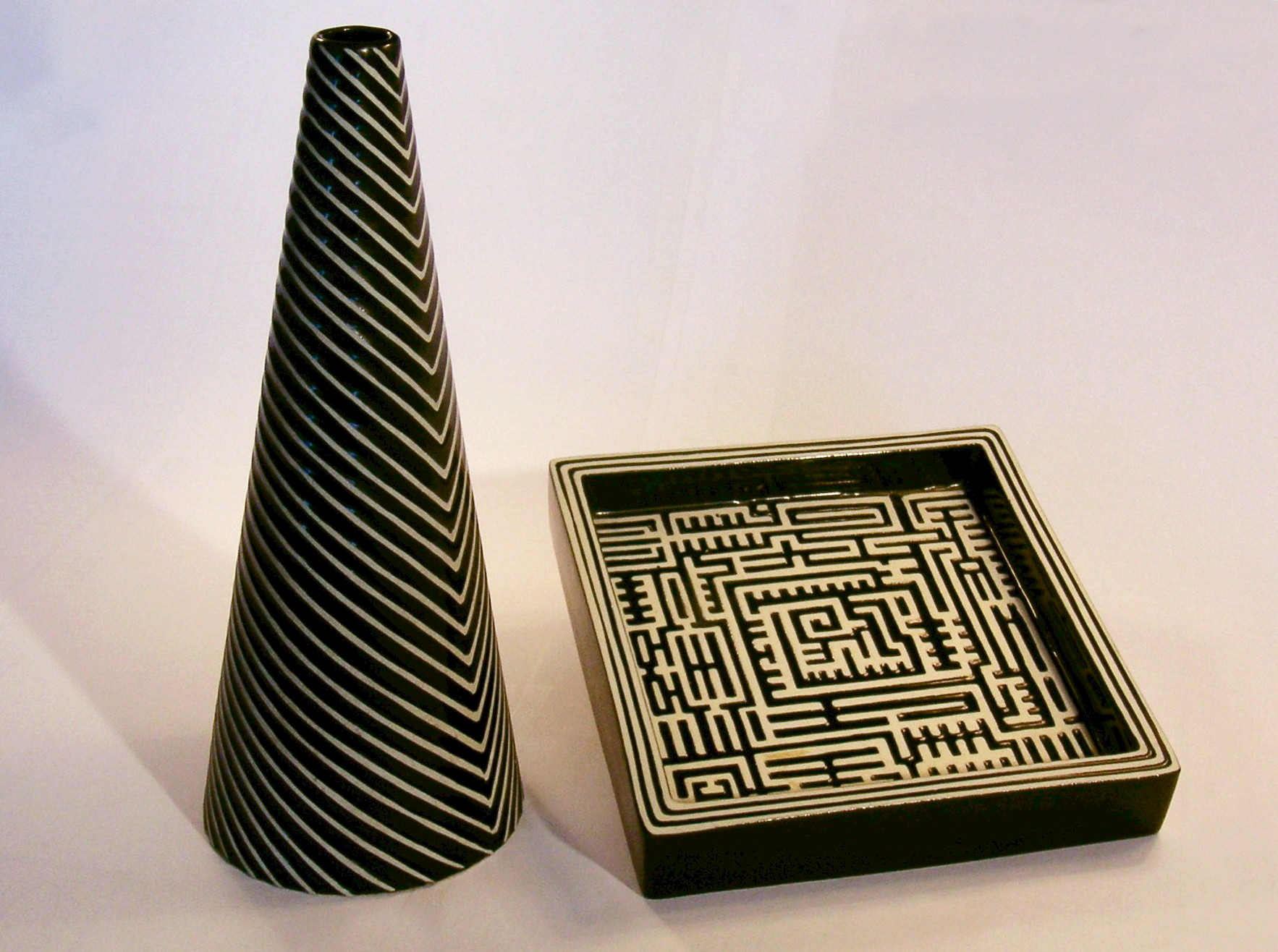
A vase and an ashtray from Stig Lindbergs "Domino" series

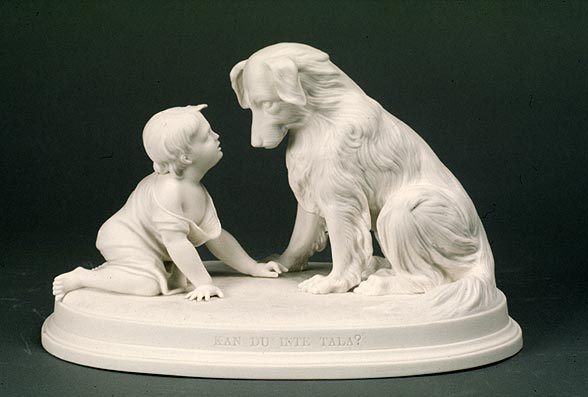
Kan du inte tala (Can you not talk), designed by Princess Eugenie of Sweden

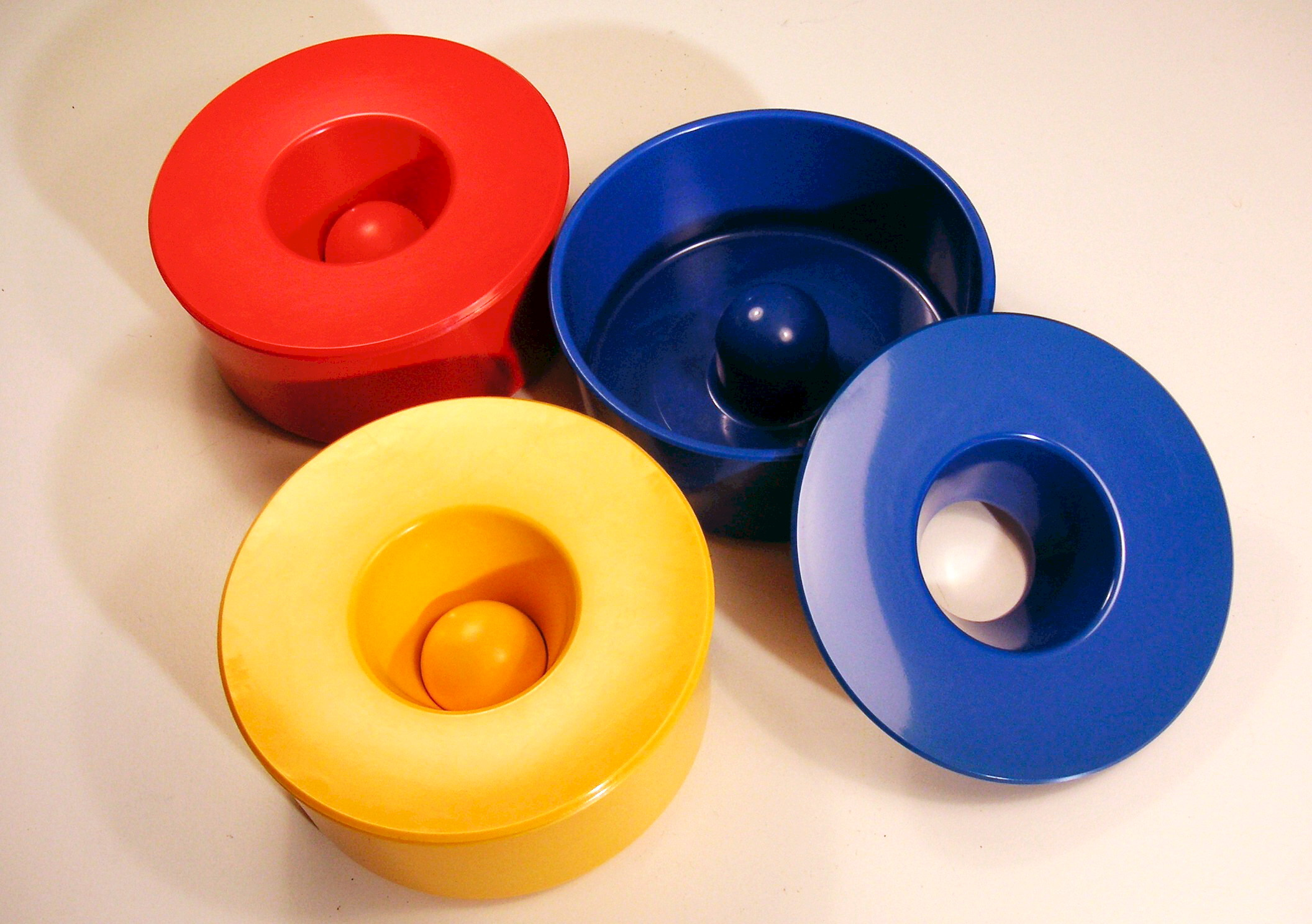
Kulan ashtrays

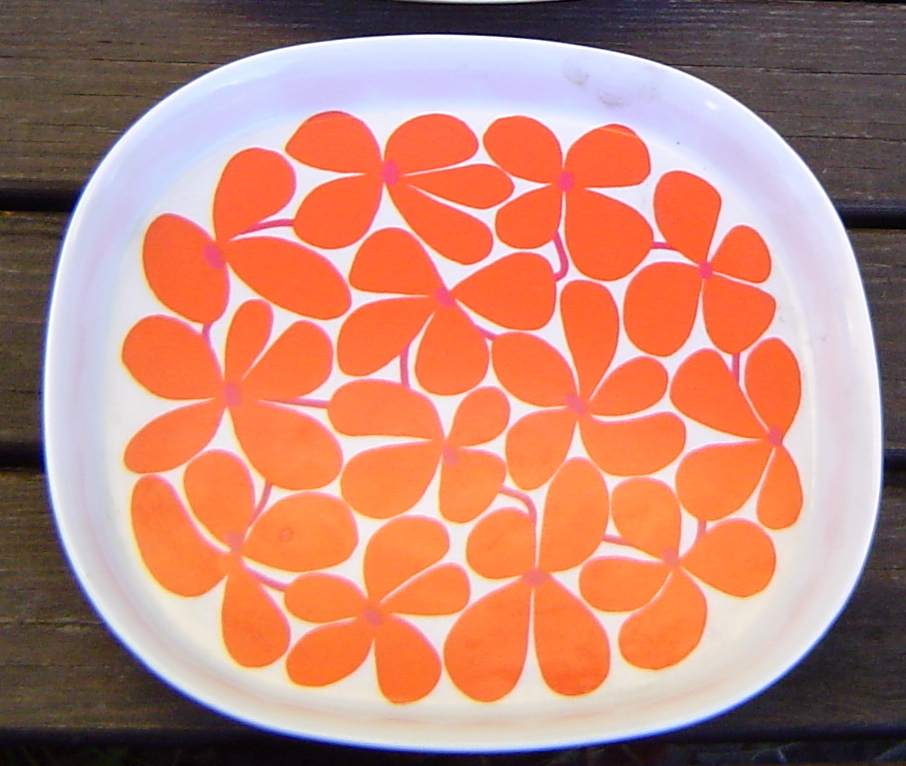
Plastic plate, designed by Stig Lindberg

== See also ==
- Bernadotte & Kylberg
