= Wilhelm Kåge =

Swedish artist and designer (1889–1960)

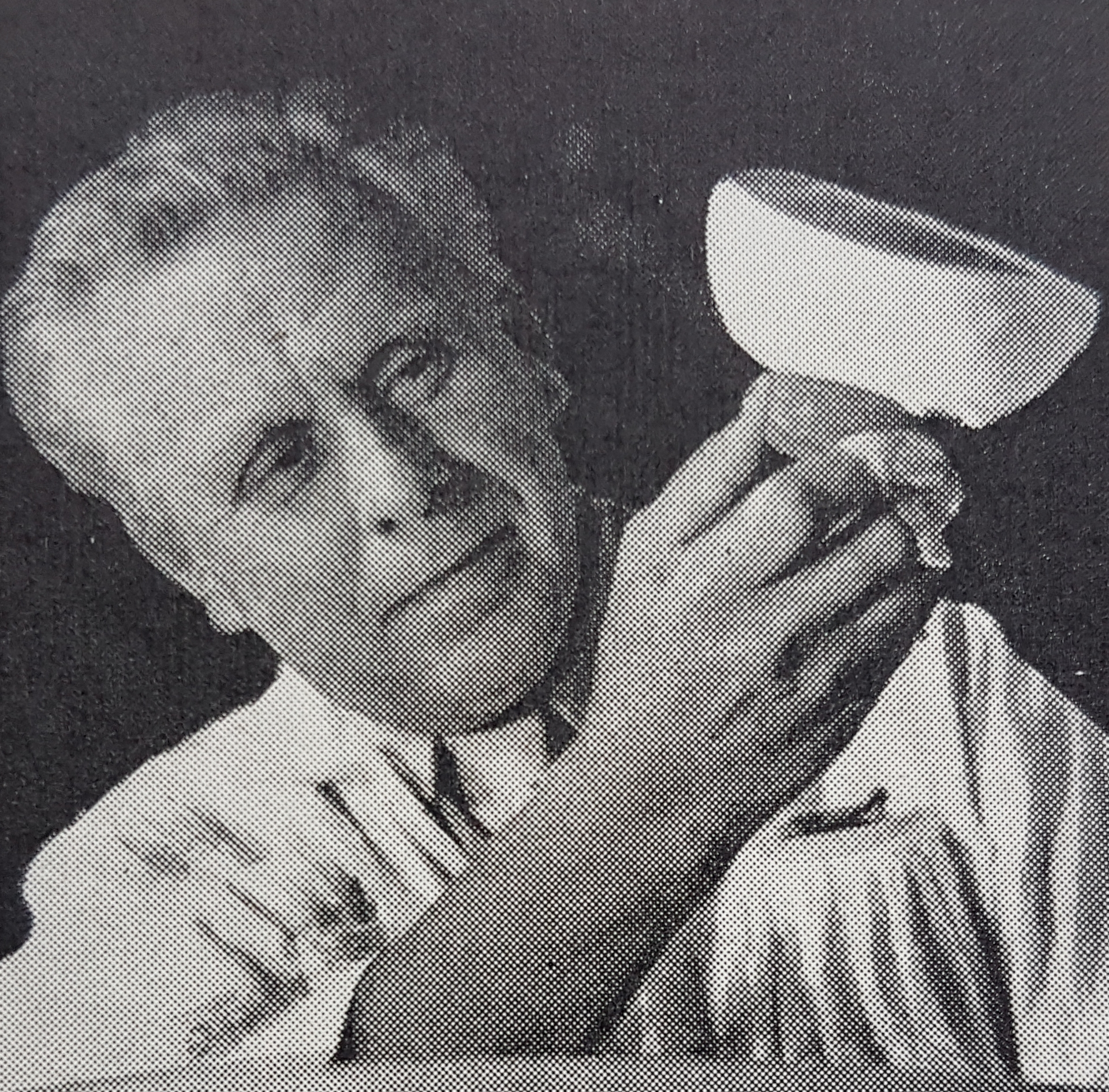
Wilhelm Kåge

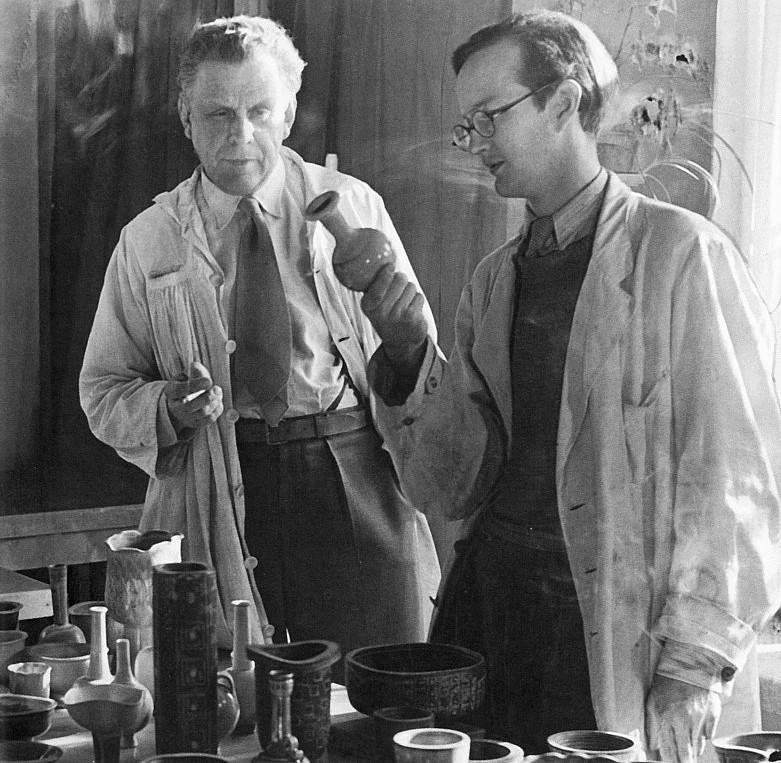
Wilhelm Kåge (left) and Stig Lindberg, c. 1938

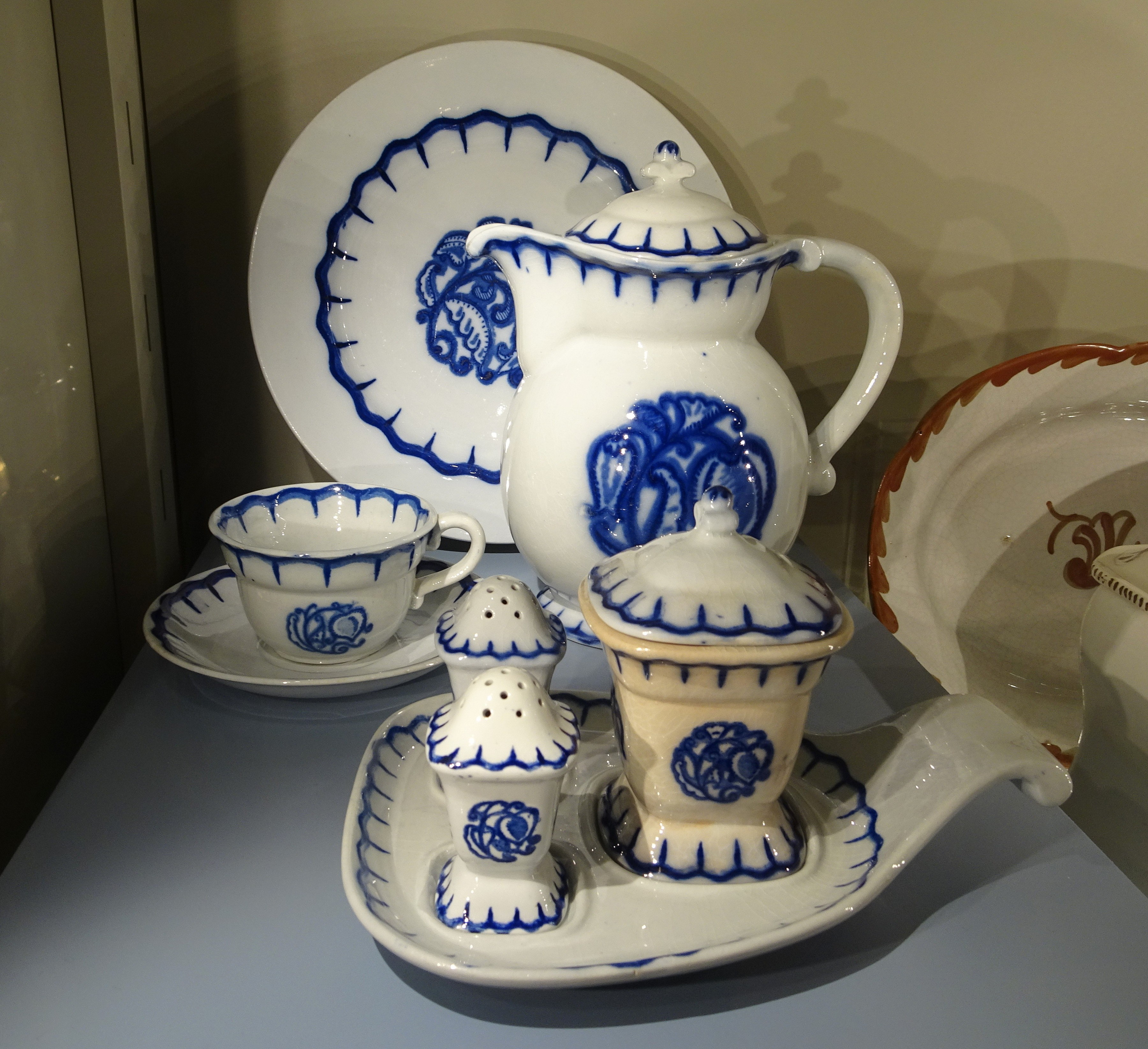
Liljeblå ceramics by Wilhelm Kåge (1917)

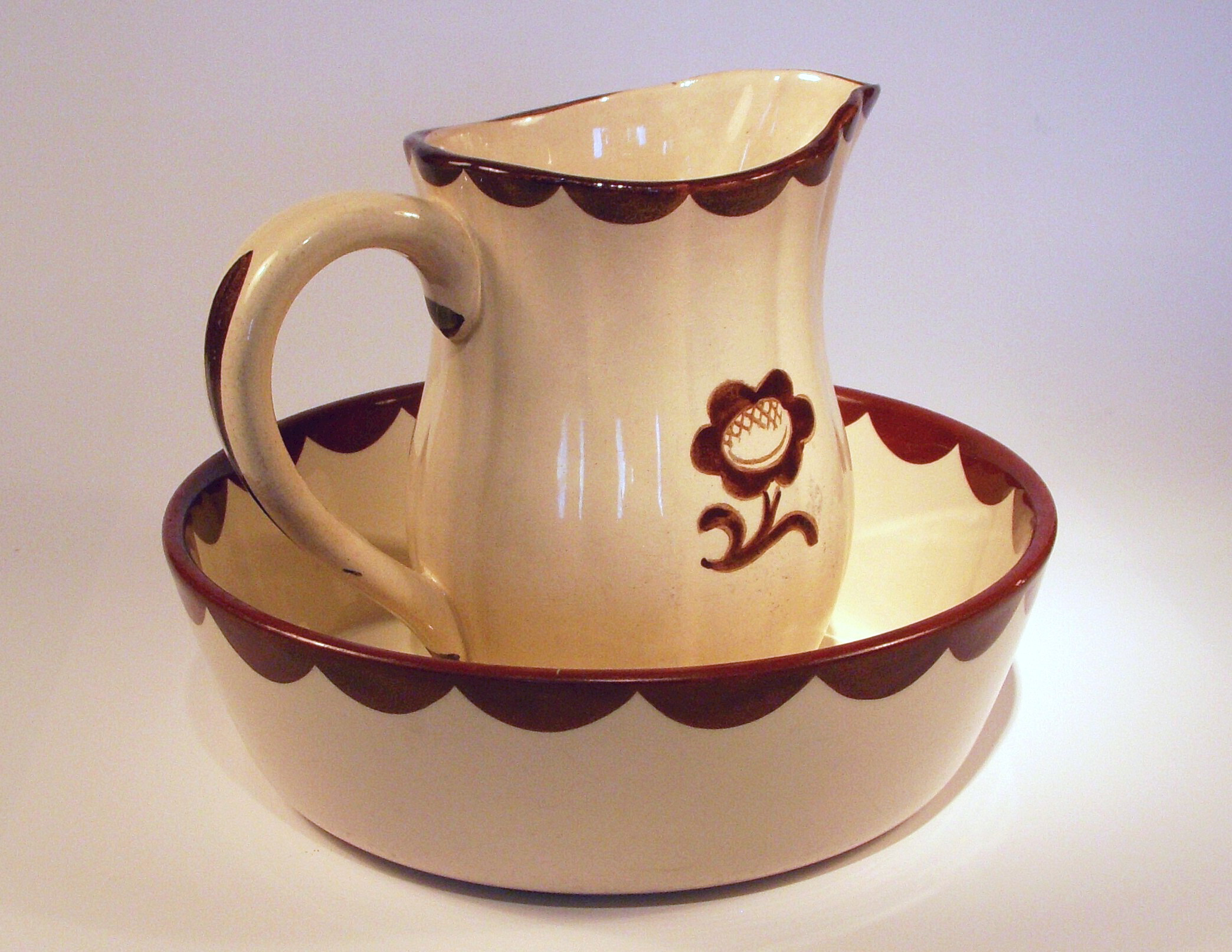
Pyro water jug and washbasin

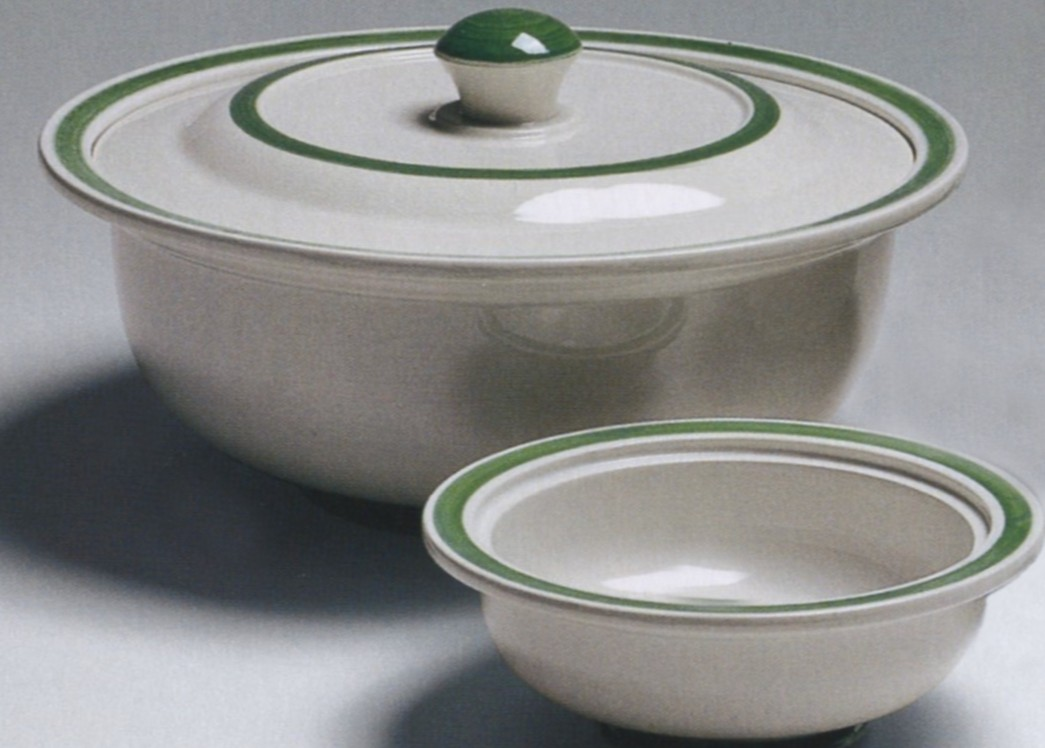
Practika ceramics (1933)

Algot Wilhelm Kåge (6 March 1889 – 25 November 1960) was a Swedish artist and designer, mainly known as a ceramic designer and as the artistic leader of the Gustavsberg porcelain factory.

Kåge studied decorative painting at Tekniska skolan in Stockholm and later for the painter Carl W. Wilhelmson in Gothenburg, Johan Rohde in Copenhagen and at Plakatschule in Munich, where he learnt graphic techniques.

His early career was dedicated to advertising and the production of posters, but his best known work was in ceramics, begun when he was appointed artistic leader of Gustavsberg in 1917, remaining there until 1949, when he was succeeded by Stig Lindberg. He was presented with the Prince Eugen Medal for design that same year.

The focus of Kåge's early ceramic designs, as of much of Swedish design of this period was on practical solutions to social issues, an example of which was his Praktika (1933), a simply designed and stackable set of tableware aimed at working-class families. Praktika was a commercial failure, as the intended buyers preferred more traditional and ornate products.

Kåge's most commercially successful design was the green-glazed Argenta earthenware with decorations in silver, that was produced in many shapes and with many different surface designs.
