= Gustavsberg, Värmdö Municipality =

Gustavsberg
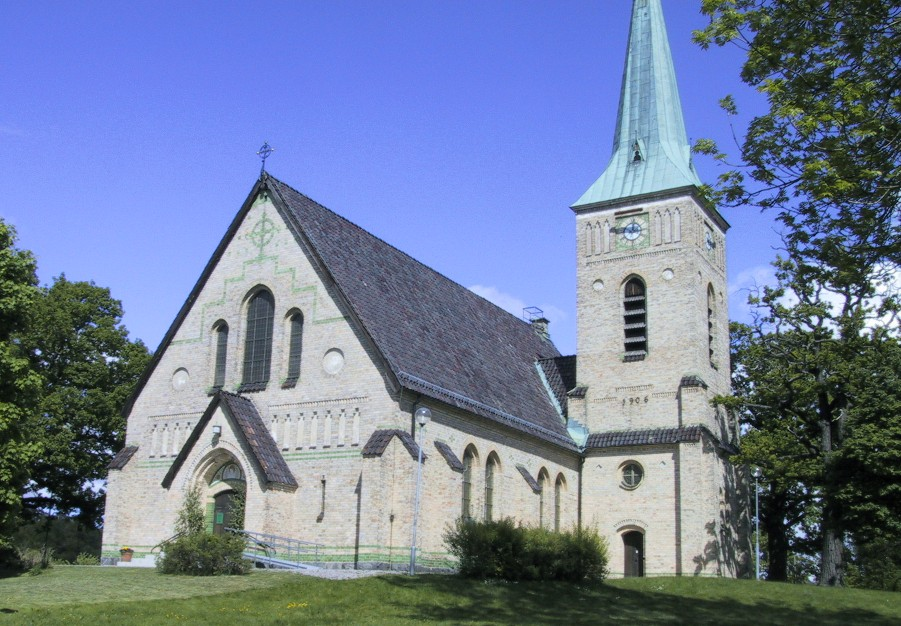
- Gustavsberg Church

- Location within Stockholm Location within Sweden Location within European Union
- Coordinates: 59°20′N 18°23′E
- Country: Sweden
- Province: Uppland
- County: Stockholm County
- Municipality: Värmdö Municipality

Area
  - Total: 4.27 km^{2} (1.65 sq mi)

Population (31 December 2020)
  - Total: 24,341
  - Density: 5,700/km^{2} (14,800/sq mi)
- Demonyms: Gustavsberger; Gustavsbergian; Gustavsbergan
- Time zone: UTC+1 (CET)
  - Summer (DST): UTC+2 (CEST)

Gustavsberg is a locality situated on the island of Värmdö in Sweden's Stockholm archipelago. From an administrative perspective, it is in Stockholm County and is the seat of Värmdö Municipality. It has 24,000 inhabitants as of 2023. It is most known for its porcelain factory, Gustavsberg porcelain, and toilet bowls distributed nationwide and internationally.

Ösbyträsk Nature Reserve is located nearby.
